= List of parties participating in the 2001 Bangladesh elections =

List of parties participating in the 2001 Bangladesh elections Party name followed by election symbol.

1. National Patriotic Party - Aeroplane
2. Bangladesh Khelafat Andolon - Banyan Tree
3. Ganatantri Party - Pigeon
4. Bangladesher Samajtantrik Dal - Lock
5. Bangladesh Awami League - Boat
6. Bangladesh Gano Azadi League (Samad) - Dheki (Husking pedal)
7. United Peoples Party - Bullock cart
8. Bangladesh Islamic Front - Candle
9. Bangladesher Samyabadi Dal (Marksbadi-Leninbadi) - Chair
10. Bangladesh Hindu League - Conch-shell (Shankha)
11. Bangladesh People's League - Elephant
12. Jatiya Samajtanrik Dal - Torch
13. Workers Party of Bangladesh - Hammer
14. Bangladesh Bekar Samaj - Pushcart
15. Bangladesh National Congress - Horse
16. Bangladesh National Awami Party (NAP) - Hut
17. Jatiya Janata Party (Sheikh Asad) - Deer
18. Bangladesh Muslim League - Lantern (Hurricane)
19. Pragatishil Jatiyatabadi Dal (Nurul Alam Mowla) - Moon
20. Jatiya Party (Ershad) - Plough
21. Bangladesh Samajtantrik Dal (Mahbub) - Rickshaw
22. Zaker Party - Rose
23. Jamaat-e-Islami Bangladesh - Balance scale
24. Bangladesh Nationalist Party - Sheaf of Paddy
25. Communist Party of Bangladesh - Sickle
26. Jatiya Biplobi Front - Kite
27. Progotishil Ganatantrik Party - Spade
28. Freedom Party - Star
29. Bangladesh Islami Biplobi Parishad - Sword
30. National Democratic Party - Tiger
31. Shramik Krishak Samajbadi Dal - Umbrella
32. Bangladesh Sarbahara Party - Wheel
33. Oikyo Prokria - Lion
34. Communist Kendra - Key
35. Democratic Republican Party - Peacock
36. Deshprem Party - Ektara
37. New York Taxi Driver Shomiti (Abdul Majumder) - Yellow Taxi
38. Bangladesh Krishak Sramik Janata Party - Book
39. Bangladesh Bhashani Adayrsha Bastabayon Party - Duck
40. Bangladesh Samajik Sangsad (Darshan Shabha) - Mango
41. Bangladesh Peoples Party - Rocket
42. Bhashani Front - Lamp
43. Bangladesh Islami Party - Pitcher
44. Kuran Darshan Sangstha Bangladesh - Anchor
45. Kuran O Sunnah Bastabayon Party - Apple
46. Liberal Party Bangladesh - Oar
47. Gano Forum - Rising Sun
48. Gano Oikya Front - Balloon
49. Jatya Samajtantrik Dal (Mohiuddin) - Battery
50. Jatya Daridra Party - Thala (Plate)
51. Janadal - Bucket
52. Tahreek-e-Olema-e-Bangladesh Table
53. National Awami Party (Bhashani-Mushtak) - Camel
54. Bangladesh Jatiya Sheba Dal - Coconut
55. Bangladesh Jatyatabadi Awami League (Mostafa Allam) - Tube-well
56. Bangladesh Janata Party - Bus
57. Bangladesh Tanjimul Muslemeen Garland
58. Bangladesh Mehnati Front - Helicopter
59. Bangladesh National Awami Party (Bhashani) - Fishing Hook
60. Bangladesh Tofsili Jati Federation (Sudheer Chandra Sirker)- Palki (Palanquin)
61. Hoq Kathar Moncha - Prawn
62. Sath Daliya Jote (Mirpur) - Mathal (Straw hat)
63. Samridda Bangladesh Andolon - Fish
64. Sammillita Sangram Parishad - Table Clock
65. Social Democratic Party - Mug
66. Bangladesh Tofsili Jati Federation (Swapan Kumar Mondol) - Jack Fruit
67. Bangladesh Jatiya Agrogati Party (Abdur Rahim Sikdar) - Tiffin Carrier
68. Bangladesh Krishak Sramik Mukti Andolon (Krishak Mohammed Sadeq) - Cock
69. Bangladesh Manobadhikar Dal - Pineapple
70. Bangladesh Jatiya League (Abdus Sobhan) - Top
71. Bangladesh Bastahara Parishad - Truck
72. Shramajibi Oikya Forum (Shamsul Islam) - Telephone
73. Islami Dal Bangladesh (Saifur Rahman) - Tractor
74. Bangladesh Krishak Raj Islami Party (Quari Fazlul Hoq Sardar) - Glass
75. Bangladesh National Awami Party (NAP-Bhashani) - Stick
76. Islami Al Jihad Dal - Bunch of Bananas
77. Jamiat Olemaye Islam Bangladesh - Date Tree
78. Jatiya Janata Party (Adv Nurul Islam Khan) - Ladder
79. Peoples Muslim League - Suitcase
80. Samriddhay Bangladesh Bapshayee Sampraday - Spoon
81. Krishak Sramik Janata League - Gamcha
82. Bangladesh Jatiya Tati Dal - Spinning Wheel
83. Jatiya Party (Manju) - Bicycle
84. Bangladesh Progressive Party - Pen and inkpot
85. Liberal Democratic Party - Wrist
86. Jatiya Janata Party-Hafizur - Cow
87. Islami Oikya Jote - Minaret
88. Islami Shashantantro Andolon - Hand-fan
89. People's Democratic Party - Car
90. Bangladesh Labour Party - Motorcycle
91. Bangladesh Nejam-e-Islam Party - Butterfly
92. Pakmon People's Party - Rail-engine
93. Somo-Samaj Ganotantri Party - Building
94. Bangladesh Krishak Sramik Awami League - Mike
95. Bangladesh People's Congress - Television
96. Bangladesh Jatiyatabadi Palli Dal - Cauliflower
