= 2018 Bangladesh election violence =

Political violence in Bangladesh

2018 Bangladesh election violence refers to a series of brutal attacks, mostly on opposition party candidates and clashes between ruling and opposition party men centering on the general election on December 30, 2018.

According to UN human rights experts, from December 9 to 12 a total of 47 such incidents of violence were reported, in which eight people were killed and 560 were injured, mostly from the ruling party.

On December 18 the major opposition party of the country, the Bangladesh Nationalist Party (BNP), claimed that at least 4 party activists have been killed and 152 of 300 candidates have been attacked while campaigning. Moreover, 16 candidates from the alliance of opposition groups are in jail. The number of activists arrested by police after the declaration of the election schedule is around 21,000 according to the leaders of the Jatiya Oikya Front, the largest opposition alliance in the country.

The victims of violence include former ministers, parliamentarians, veteran freedom fighters and senior leaders from the opposition alliance. At least 70 candidates from the opposition alliance Jatiya Oikya Front claimed that they could not participate in the campaign for fear of attacks against them.

Renowned human rights watchdog Human Rights Watch, in its bulletin titled "Bangladesh: Crackdown as Elections Loom," claimed that "Bangladesh security forces have been arresting and intimidating opposition figures and threatening freedom of expression in advance of national elections."

On January 3, 2019, Human Rights Watch called for an investigation into attacks on members of the opposition parties before and during Bangladesh's elections.

== Background ==
After the 1994-96 protest for neutral election time governments, Bangladesh amended the constitution to include a caretaker government system to oversee elections. Successive caretaker governments conducted free, fair and credible national elections in 1996, 2001 and 2008.

In 2011, the Awami League led government in Bangladesh scrapped the provision for election time caretaker governments following a much debated Supreme Court ruling which declared the caretaker government system illegal, creating a political crisis in the country.

The 2014 general election was then held under the supervision of the Awami League government and was boycotted by 30 of 42 registered political parties in the country, resulting in further deterioration of the political situation.

In 2018, Bangladesh's election commission announced the schedule of another general election, which will again be held with the Awami League in power and its chief Sheikh Hasina as the Prime Minister. The election was set to take place on December 30, 2018.

== Election schedule ==
Chief Election Commissioner KM Nurul Huda initially announced December 23, 2018 as the date of the general election. According to the schedule, the last date for filing candidate nomination papers was November 19, and the last date for withdrawal of candidates was November 29.

After public hue and cry, the commission rescheduled the election date to December 30, 2018, with December 9 as the last date for withdrawal of candidates on November 12.

== Violence ==
=== Police harassment ===
BNP's candidate for the Dhaka-1 constituency Khondokar Abu Ashfaq was detained on December 11, 2018, while campaigning. The officer in charge of Dohar police, Md Sazzad, said he was detained "on security grounds." He was later freed.

As of December 21, Bangladesh police have detained 16 opposition party candidates who will be running for the election. In addition, Jatiya Oikya Front leaders have claimed that 21,000 activists of the alliance have been detained by police after the announcement of the election.

The list of candidates jailed by police before the election includes:

List of candidates in jail
| Candidate's Name | Constituency | Alliance/Party |
|---|---|---|
| Maulana Abdul Hakim | Thakurgaon-2 | 20 Party Alliance |
| Monowar Hossain | Magura-1 | Bangladesh Nationalist Party |
| Abul Kalam Azad | Khulna-6 | 20 Party Alliance |
| Abdul Khaleque Mondal | Satkhira-2 | 20 Party Alliance |
| Khairul Kabir Khokon | Narshingdi-1 | Bangladesh Nationalist Party |
| Sultan Salahuddin Tuku | Tangail-2 | Bangladesh Nationalist Party |
| SM Jilani | Gopalganj-3 | Bangladesh Nationalist Party |
| Shahadat Hossain | Chattogram-9 | Bangladesh Nationalist Party |
| ANM Shamsul Haque | Chattogram-15 | 20 Party Alliance |
| AHM Hamidur Rahman Azad | Cox's Bazar-2 | 20 Party Alliance |
| Monirul Haque Chowdhury | Cumilla-10 | Bangladesh Nationalist Party |
| Abdul Gaffar Chowdhury | Chittagong-7 | Bangladesh Nationalist Party |
| Abu Sayeed Chan | Rajshahi-6 | 20 Party Alliance |
| AKM Fazlul Haque Milon | Gazipur-5 | Bangladesh Nationalist Party |
| Gazi Nazrul Islam | Satkhira-4 | Bangladesh Nationalist Party |
| Abu Syed Md. Shahadat Hussain | Jashore-2 | 20 Party Alliance |
| Abu Taher | Cumilla-7 | Jatiya Samajtantrik Dal-JSD |

Nazma Rahman, the wife of 20 Party Alliance candidate from Jhenaidaha-3 Motiar Rahman, was accused in a vandalism case on December 11, after police failed to nab her husband.

In Dhaka-16, BNP candidate Ahsanullah's wife Rina Hasan was obstructed by Awami League activists while campaigning with other women party members. After returning home local police arrested her, rather than taking any action against the Awami League activists.

On December 15, the Supreme Court Bar Association's Secretary General Mahbub Uddin Khokon, also the BNP candidate from Noakhali-1, alleged that he was shot by the local police while campaigning. Police Superintendent Ilias Sharif defended the attack, saying it was an attempt to bring the situation under control.

Following a December 20 attack on the BNP's Jhalakathi-2 candidate, Jeba Amin Khan, police arrested local BNP leaders instead of arresting the attackers.

Also on December 20, police pressed a charge sheet against Saiful Alam Nirob, BNP candidate in Dhaka-12, and 37 others, resulting in court issued arrest warrants in a case filed for assaulting police and preventing them from discharging their duties in December 2017.

Some reports stated that supporters of the opposition parties were arrested just before the Bangladesh elections occurred on December 30. The violence that erupted before election day left at least 17 people dead.

=== Attacks on candidates ===
No less than 100 candidates have been allegedly attacked by Bangladesh Awami League (BAL) men throughout the country. Even party leaders who are not taking part in the election were allegedly attacked in the open with police standing as spectators.

Dr. Kamal Hossain, the leader of the Jatiya Oikya Front was attacked on December 14, 2018, while coming out of the Martyred Intellectuals Memorial in Dhaka along with A. S. M. Abdur Rab after paying homage to the martyred intellectuals of the Liberation War of Bangladesh.

Bangladesh Nationalist Party's Secretary General Mirza Fakhrul Islam Alamgir's motorcade was attacked at Thakurgaon while campaigning in his area.

Several members of the Bangladesh Nationalist Party's National Standing Committee including Mirza Abbas, Moudud Ahmed and Dr. Abdul Moyeen Khan were attacked during the campaign, on at least two separate occasions. Another National Standing Committee member, former minister and a Hindu minority leader of the party Gayeshwar Chandra Roy was brutally attacked just four days before the election.

War veteran Oli Ahmad, the chief of the Liberal Democratic Party was attacked while campaigning at Chottogram.

Other prominent leaders, including former minister Abdullah Al Noman of Chattogram-10, former minister Professor Abu Sayeed of Pabna-1, former minister Shah Moazzem Hossain of Munsiganj-1 and Supreme Court Bar Association Secretary General Mahbub Uddin Khokon of Noakhali-1 were attacked while campaigning. BNP Chairperson's advisor and BNP candidate from Pabna-4, Habibur Rahman Habib, was stabbed by Awami League activists while campaigning.

Former Minister and Jatiya Oikya Front candidate Professor Abu Sayeed was the victim of 17-18 criminal attacks from December 10 to December 27, approximately one attack each day.

Even women leaders were not spared, former minister Mirza Abbas's wife and BNP contender of Dhaka-9 Afroza Abbas, former minister Iqbal Hassan Mahmood's wife Rumana Mahmood of Sirajganj-2, former minister Ruhul Quddus Talukdar's wife Sabina Yasmin Chhobi of Natore-2, and Communist Party of Bangladesh candidate Jolly Talukdar were repeatedly attacked.

Mahmudur Rahman Manna, chief of Nagorik Oikya, and candidate from Bogura-2, was attacked in Dhaka while campaigning for his party's candidate at Uttara.

Former UN official and prominent economist Dr. Reza Kibria, the Jatiya Oikyafront candidate for Habiganj-1, came under attack in his constituency.

Among other leaders Fariduzzaman, Jatiya Oikyafront candidate for Narail-2; GM Siraj, BNP candidate for Bogura-5; Sharifuzzaman, BNP candidate for Chuadanga-1; Manjurul Alam Bimol, 20-party candidate for Natore-1; Jeba Amin, BNP candidate for Jhalakathi-2; Azharul Islam Manna, BNP candidate for Narayanganj-3, Aminul Farid, Left Democratic Alliance candidate for Bogura-6; Jafrul Islam Chowdhury, BNP candidate for Chattogram-16; Irfan Ibne Aman, BNP candidate for Dhaka-2, and Zonayed Saki, Left Democratic Alliance candidate for Dhaka-12 were attacked in an incident during the campaign.

Prominent Bangladeshi singer Kanak Chapa, BNP's candidate from Sirajganj-1 was forced to leave her constituency because she feared for her life.

Former minister and independent candidate from Tangail 4, Abdul Latif Siddique was attacked in his area during the campaign. He subsequently withdrew from the election to protect his life.

Jatiya Party leader Mahmudul Islam Chowdhury from Chottogram-16 was injured along with 30 of his supporters when miscreants opened fire on his motorcade during the campaign.

=== Incidents of death ===
As of December 30, 2018, at least fifteen political activists have died including 10 on election day in the run-up of the 2018 Bangladeshi general election.

- Two youths died in Dhaka at an intra-party clash involving the Bangladesh Awami League on November 9.
- Abu Bakar Abu, vice president of the Jashore district Bangladesh Nationalist Party, and candidate seeking nomination was found dead on November 23, two days after he was abducted from Dhaka.
- On December 8, 2018, unidentified criminals stabbed a Bangladesh Chhatra League leader to death in Dhaka.
- On December 11, two activists of the Bangladesh Awami League died after clashing with Bangladesh Nationalist Party men in Noakhali district and Faridpur district.
- On December 15, Md Rasel, a member of the Bangladesh Jatiotabadi Chatra Dal's Chottogram EPZ thana unit died after falling from a rooftop, while allegedly being chased by police.
- On December 30, 2018, at least 17 people were killed in clashes between ruling party supporters and the opposition.

== Reactions ==
United Nations Secretary General António Guterres has called upon the government to ensure an environment "free of violence, intimidation and coercion" before, during and after the elections and has placed emphasis on holding a peaceful, credible and inclusive poll.

Referring to the ongoing violence in Bangladesh, global rights group Human Rights Watch's Asia Director Brad Adams said in a statement, "The Awami League government has been systematically cracking down on independent and opposition voices to ensure that the ruling party faces no obstacles to total political control." He added that, "Members and supporters of the main opposition parties have been arrested, killed, even disappeared, creating an atmosphere of fear and repression that is not consistent with credible elections."

US Ambassador to Bangladesh, Earl R. Miller commented that people from all parties were attacked during the campaign, but that opposition party members "bore the brunt" of the violence.

The United States Department of State issued a statement on December 21, 2018, that the United States government is disappointed with the Government of Bangladesh's refusal to grant VISAs for the observers of the Asian Network for Free Elections.

British Minister of State for Asia and the Pacific Mark Field MP in a statement urged everyone in Bangladesh to refrain from further violence.

A joint statement by 15 international election observers including the Asian Human Rights Commission and International Federation for Human Rights called the electoral environment of Bangladesh ahead of the 2018 election "undemocratic".

Bangladeshi rights group Ain O Salish Kendra, has condemned the attack on opposition men across the country in an official statement.

Jatiya Oikya Front's leader Dr. Kamal Hossain said, "The level of harassment is unprecedented and contrary to constitution."

Election Commissioner Rafiqul Islam has downplayed the level of violence, opining that the violence is a part of elections in Bangladesh's political culture.
