= 2018 Bangladeshi general election =

- 30 December 2018

300 of the 350 seats in the Jatiya Sangsad 151 seats needed for a majority
- Registered: 104,142,381
- Turnout: 82.58% (▲43pp)
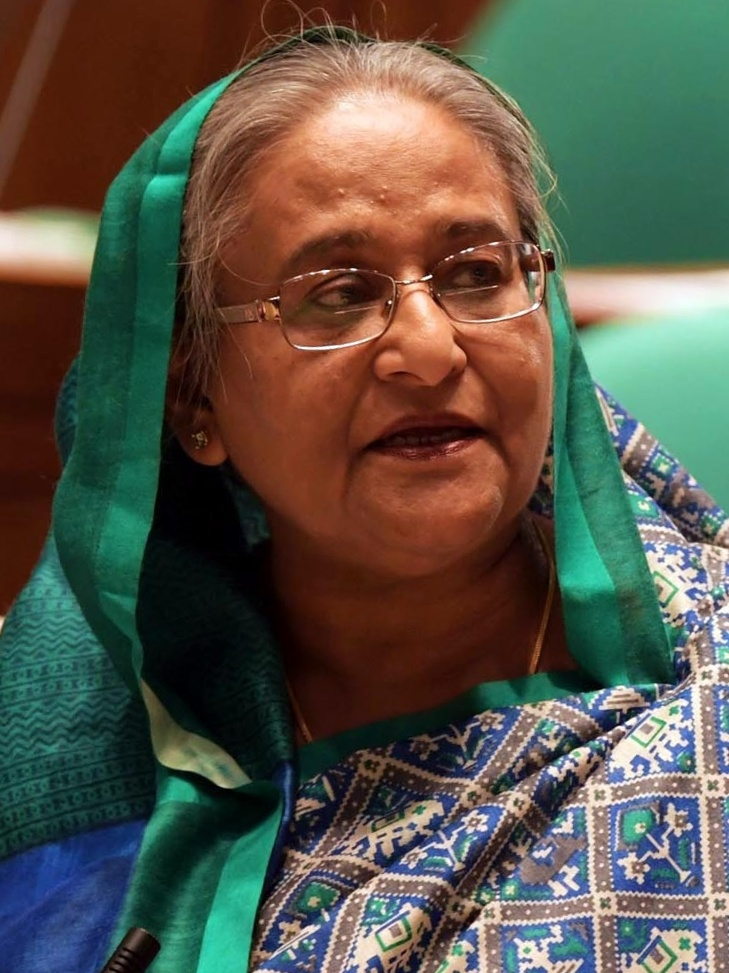

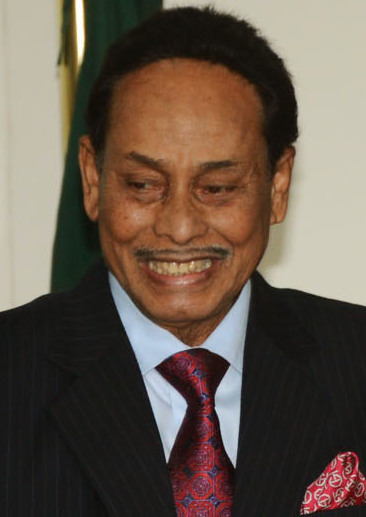

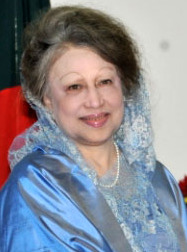
	First party	Second party	Third party
Leader	Sheikh Hasina	HM Ershad	Khaleda Zia
Party	AL	JP(E)	BNP
Alliance	Grand Alliance	Grand Alliance	Jatiya Oikya Front
Leader's seat	Gopalganj-3 (won)	Rangpur-3 (won); Dhaka-17 (withdrawn; lost)	Did not contest
Last election	72.14%, 234 seats	7.00%, 34 seats	Boycotted
Seats won	257	24	6
Seat change	▲23	▼10	▲6
Popular vote	63,805,379	4,443,351	9,985,202
Percentage	74.96%	5.22%	11.73%
Swing	▲2.82pp	▼1.78pp	▲11.73pp
- Results by constituency
Prime Minister before election
Sheikh Hasina
AL
Prime Minister after election
Sheikh Hasina
AL

General elections were held in Bangladesh on 30 December 2018 to elect 300 directly elected members of the Jatiya Sangsad. The result was another landslide victory for the Awami League-led Grand Alliance led by Sheikh Hasina. The elections were marred by violence, and were widely considered by opposition politicians and the international community to be rigged.

According to political scientist Ali Riaz, the elections were not free and fair. BBC News, among others, observed some apparent vote rigging by the Awami League, with some referring to it as the 'midnight election' due to ballot boxes allegedly being filled the night before election day. Opposition leader Kamal Hossain rejected the results, calling it "farcical" and demanding fresh elections to be held under a neutral government. The Bangladesh Election Commission said it would investigate reported vote-rigging allegations from "across the country", but never did. The Awami League called it "one of the best elections held ever." The election saw the use of electronic voting machines for the first time.

== Background ==
The previous general elections in January 2014 were boycotted by the main opposition alliance, led by the Bangladesh Nationalist Party (BNP) and former prime minister Khaleda Zia. As a result, the Awami League, led by Prime Minister Sheikh Hasina, won a landslide victory, taking 234 of the 300 seats in an election that saw 153 seats uncontested.

In July 2017, the BNP stated that it was ready to contest the next general elections if parliament was dissolved and the election commission consisted of non-partisan members. On 14 September 2017, the chief election commissioner confirmed that the BNP would contest the elections. However, following the conviction of BNP chair Khaleda Zia for corruption, the High Court of Bangladesh ruled that Zia was ineligible to run for office. As such, her role is unclear in any potential government which contained the BNP.

== Electoral system ==
The 350 members of the Jatiya Sangsad consist of 300 directly elected seats using first-past-the-post voting in single-member constituencies, and an additional 50 seats reserved for women. The reserved seats are distributed based on the vote share of the contesting parties, and filled with women selected by the elected members via the single transferable vote. Each parliament sits for a five-year term.

Approximately 100 million voters were expected to vote from 40,199 polling stations across the country. Electronic voting machines were used in six constituencies.

=== Criticism ===
The electoral system has been criticised as disproportional and a key driver of political deadlock in the country.

== Schedule ==
Chief Election Commissioner KM Nurul Huda initially announced 23 December 2018 as the date of the general election. According to the schedule, the last date for filing candidate nomination papers was 19 November, and the last date for withdrawal of candidates was 29 November.

After public hue and cry, the commission rescheduled the election date to 30 December 2018, with 9 December as the last date for withdrawal of candidates on 12 November.

== Campaign ==
In November 2018, the Jatiya Party (Ershad) announced that it would join the Awami League-led alliance. On 28 December, Ershad announced Jatiya Party candidates contesting from "open seats" would support the ruling Awami League-led grand alliance candidates and extended his support to "my [his] 'sister' Prime Minister Sheikh Hasina". Ershad personally withdrew from contesting the Dhaka-17 seat in favour of the Awami League candidate. Ershad said, however, that "strong candidates" of his party would stay in the race.

On 13 October 2018, the Jatiya Oikya Front (National Unity Front) was formed, consisting primarily of the Gano Forum, Bangladesh Nationalist Party, Jatiya Samajtantrik Dal (Rab), and Nagorik Oikya, led by former foreign minister Kamal Hossain of the Gano Forum. On 18 December, the alliance announced a 14-point manifesto, which included a pledge to reduce the power of the office of Prime Minister.

There was controversy in the run-up to the elections surrounding the nomination of banned Jamaati candidates under the BNP banner. In 2013, the hard-line, right-wing, Islamist party, Jamaat-e-Islami was banned from registering and therefore contesting in elections by the High Court, citing their charter violates the constitution. Twenty-five Jamaati candidates ran in the election, with twenty-two nominations for BNP and three running as independents. An investigation was launched, but on 23 December, the Election Commission Secretary, Helaluddin Ahmed, said they had examined the related law and "there is no scope for rejecting the Jamaat leaders' candidacy at this moment." On 26 December, just days before the election, Jatiya Oikya Front leader Kamal Hossain expressed his regret about Jamaat's involvement in the elections under his alliance, claiming, "had I known [that Jamaat leaders will be given BNP tickets] I would not have been part of it." The media, however, had reported involvement at the end of November.

Khaleda Zia filed nomination papers for the Bogra-6, Bogra-7 and Feni-1 constituencies. All three sets of nomination papers were rejected by the Election Commission as a result of her convictions in two corruption cases. The Constitution states anyone sentenced to more than 2 years imprisonment for a criminal offence must allow 5 years to lapse before being permitted to contest a parliamentary constituency. The Supreme Court upheld an order issued by the High Court to that effect, ending any possibility of Zia contesting a constituency.

In accordance with election commission rules, campaigning was halted at 08:00 AM on the morning of 28 December.

== Parties and alliances ==
=== Grand Alliance (AL+) ===
Seat share by parties of the Grand Alliance
No.	Party	Flag/ Logo	Symbol	Leading Candidate(s)	Bloc(s)	Total seats contested	Seats contested under the alliance
1.	Bangladesh Awami League			Sheikh Hasina	GA/ 14-PA	261	260
2.	Jatiya Party-JaPa (Ershad)			Hussain Muhammad Ershad	GA	176	26
3.	Workers Party of Bangladesh			Rashed Khan Menon	14-PA	8	5
4.	Jatiya Samajtantrik Dal-JaSaD (Inu)			Hasanul Haque Inu	14-PA	12	3
5.	Bikalpa Dhara Bangladesh			Abdul Mannan, Mahi B. Chowdhury	GA	25	3
6.	Bangladesh Tarikat Federation			Syed Najibul Bashar Maizbhandari	14-PA	17	1
7.	Jatiya Party-JP (Manju)			Anwar Hossain Manju	GA	11	1
8.	Bangladesh Jatiya Samajtantrik Dal (Ambia)			Mayeen Uddin Khan Badal	14-PA	1	1
Total							299

=== Jatiya Oikya Front (BNP+) ===
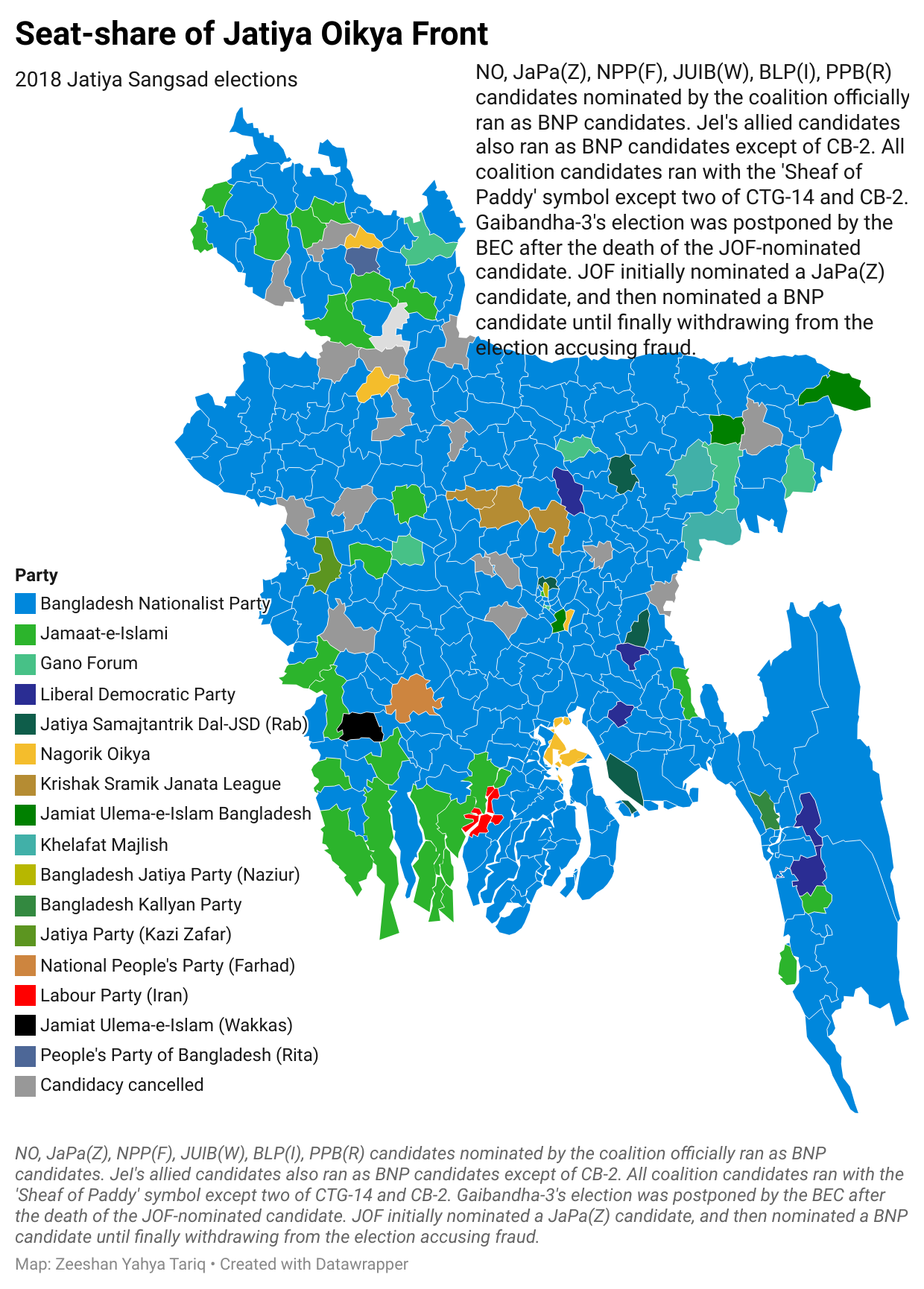
Seat-share (mapwise)

Seat share by parties of the Jatiya Oikya Front
No.	Party	Flag/ Logo	Symbol	Leading Candidate(s)	Bloc(s)	Total seats contested	Seats contested under the alliance
1.	Bangladesh Nationalist Party			Mirza Fakhrul Islam Alamgir	JOF/ 20-PA	248	248
2.	Bangladesh Jamaat-e-Islami			Shafiqur Rahman	20-PA	24	22
3.	Gano Forum			Mostafa Mohsin Montu	JOF	27	7
4.	Liberal Democratic Party			Oli Ahmad	20-PA	8	5
5.	Jatiya Samajtantrik Dal-JSD (Rab)			A. S. M. Abdur Rab	JOF	19	4
6.	Krishak Sramik Janata League				JOF	9	4
7.	Nagorik Oikya			Mahmudur Rahman Manna	JOF	4	4
8.	Jamiat Ulema-e-Islam Bangladesh				20-PA	8	3
9.	Khelafat Majlish				20-PA	12	2
11.	Bangladesh Kalyan Party			Syed Muhammad Ibrahim	20-PA	2	1
12.	Bangladesh Jatiya Party			Andaleeve Rahman Partho	20-PA	3	1
13.	National People's Party			Fariduzaman Farhad	20-PA	79	1
15.	Jamiat Ulema-e-Islam Bangladesh (Wakkas)			Muhammad Wakkas	20-PA	1	1
10.	Jatiya Party (Zafar)			Ahsan Habib Linkon	20-PA	1	1
14.	People's Party of Bangladesh			Rita Rahman	20-PA	1	1
16.	Bangladesh Labour Party			Mustafizur Rahman Iran	20-PA	1	1
Total							283

=== Left Democratic Alliance ===
Seat share by parties of the Left Democratic Alliance
No.	Party	Flag/ Logo	Symbol	Seats contested
1.	Communist Party of Bangladesh			74
2.	Socialist Party of Bangladesh			44
3.	Revolutionary Workers Party of Bangladesh			15
4.	Socialist Party of Bangladesh (Marxist)			10
5.	Ganosanhati Andolan			3
6.	Democratic Revolutionary Party			2
6.	United Communist League of Bangladesh			1
8.	Socialist Movement of Bangladesh			1
Total				130

=== Others ===
Seats contested by parties
No.	Party	Flag/ Logo	Symbol	Leading Candidate(s)	Bloc(s)	Total seats contested	Seats contested under alliance
1.	Islami Andolan Bangladesh						297
2.	Zaker Party						90
3.	Bangladesh Nationalist Front						57
4.	Bangladesh Muslim League						45
5.	Bangladesh Islami Front						25
6.	Islami Oikya Jote						24
7.	Bangladesh Khilafat Andolan						23
8.	Islamic Front Bangladesh						18
9.	Progressive Democratic Party-PDP						14
10.	Gano Front						13
11.	Bangladesh Jatiya Party						11
12.	Bangladesh National Awami Party (Muzaffar)						9
13.	Ganatantri Party						6
14.	Bangladesh Khelafat Majlish						5
15.	Jatiya Ganotantrik Party (JaGPa)						4
16.	Bangladesh National Awami Party-Bangladesh NAP			Jebel Rahman Ghaani	UF/GA		3
17.	Communist Party of Bangladesh (Marxist–Leninist) (Barua)						2
18.	Bangladesh Sanskritik Muktijote (Muktijote)						2
19.	Bangladesh Muslim League-BML						1

== Conduct ==
=== Violence ===
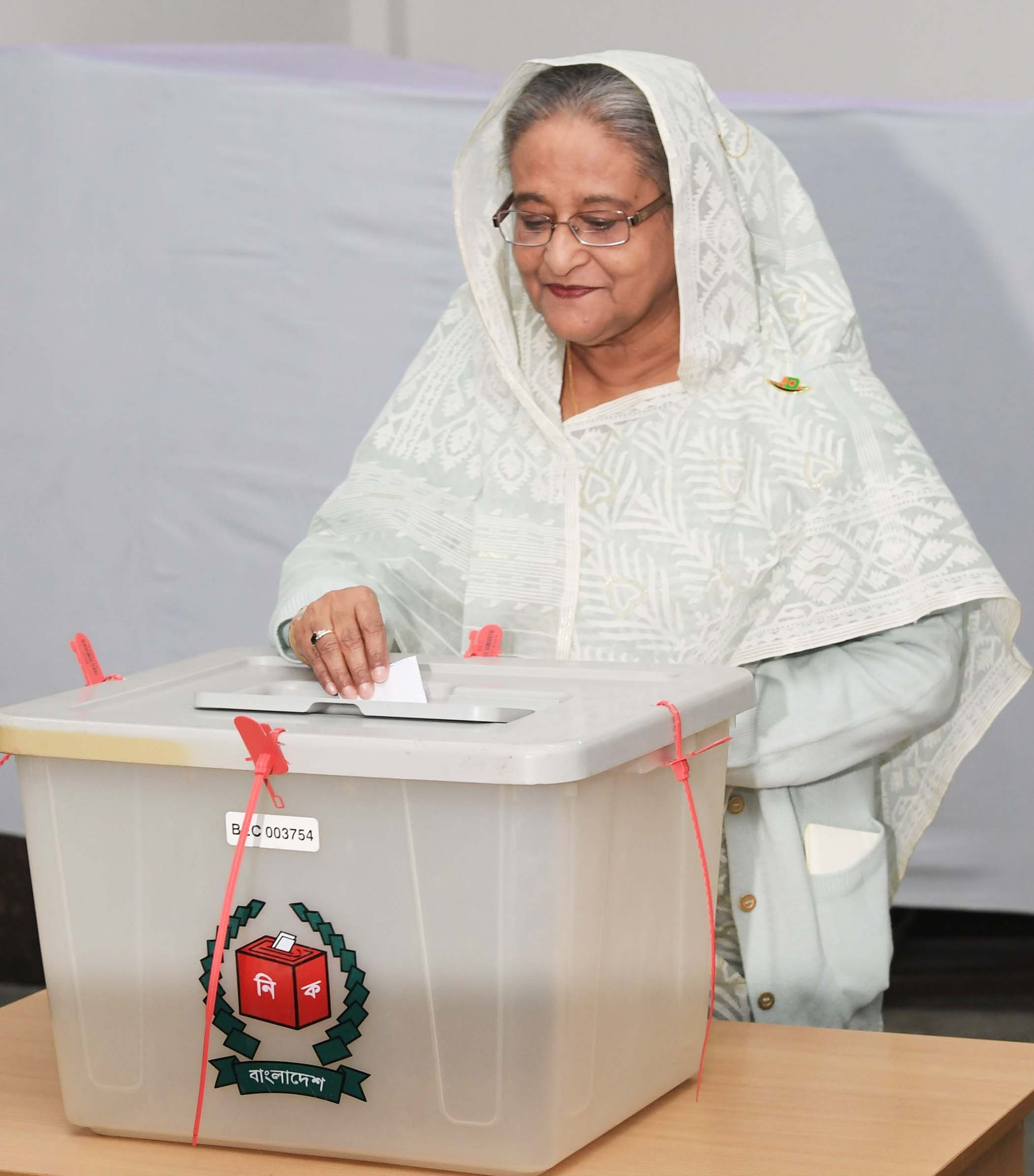
Sheikh Hasina casting her vote in the 2018 general election—often referred to as the "midnight election"—which was widely regarded by international observers as unfair and marred by irregularities.

Between 9 and 12 December 2018, 47 incidents of violence were reported, in which eight people were killed and 560 were injured.

According to the BNP Office, as of 26 December 2018, at least 12,923 people (mostly BNP, Jatiya Oikya Front, and 18 Party Alliance activists) had been injured in 2,833 attacks on opposition candidates. Between 8 November and 25 December, at least 1,574 cases were filed against BNP officials in different districts. During the same period, 15,568 activists were arrested. According to The Daily Star, at least 56 candidates, mostly from the BNP, were attacked, with around 1,190 people injured and over 800 BNP-Jamaat officials arrested between 10 and 28 December.

On 29 December, the day before the elections, the Bangladesh Telecommunication Regulatory Commission suspended 3G and 4G connections across the country until after the elections.

The newspaper The Daily Star wrote on 17 December 2018 that in violence before Bangladesh elections, some opposition candidates were attacked, 13 of them were injured, and two were arrested. On election day, at least 17 people were killed in clashes between ruling party supporters and the opposition.

Reports say that many supporters of the opposition parties were arrested just before the Bangladesh elections on 30 December 2018. The violence that erupted before the election day left at least 17 people dead.

On 3 January 2019, Human Rights Watch called for an investigation into the attack on members of the opposition party on and before Bangladesh elections.

=== Vote rigging ===
A BBC Bangla correspondent reported seeing a ballot box already filled with ballots before the polling station in Chittagong opened. Allegations of voting irregularities, including polling booths inexplicably closing for "lunch breaks", voters being turned away, and ballots being counted unrealistically quickly, were widespread. Local media published accounts by correspondents who claimed to have witnessed Awami League members stuffing ballot boxes in the presence of police and election officials. Voters also complained about getting the ruling party's symbol stamped on their ballot papers and being instructed to vote for the ruling party in polling centers. In the presence of the voting officers, some voters had to vote for Awami League candidates and refused to accept, yet their ballots were also dropped into the ballot box. The Bangladesh Election Commission promised to investigate numerous reports of vote rigging.

=== Suppression of opposition ===
Opposition candidates had encountered violence, threats, and harassment when they attempted to campaign. Dozens of candidates of the main opposition party, the BNP, were arrested on spurious charges. Few electoral agents from the opposition showed up at polling stations. Those who did show up were prevented from entering the stations by supporters of the ruling party, according to Kamal Hossain.

== Results ==
Many unregistered political parties officially contested under the banner of some registered political parties. For example, Bangladesh JaSaD's Mayeen Uddin Khan Badal contested as an Awami League candidate and won. On the other hand, unregistered members of the Jatiya Oikya Front fielded some candidates as Bangladesh Nationalist Party runners. Among them, most notably, Jamaat-e-Islami Bangladesh fielded 22 candidates who garnered more than 800,000 votes. Some other candidates fielded by Jamaat ran as independents. Likewise, non-aligned parties like Trinomool BNP fielded all of their candidates as independent.

This chart below doesn't include separate rows for these parties. Rather, it shows results regarding registered parties or independents, as published by the Bangladesh Election Commission.

Party	Votes	%	Seats			
Party	Votes	%	General	Women	Total	+/–
Awami League (Note: The voting figures of the Awami League do not include the votes for 13 candidates of allied registered parties who contested on the Awami League 'boat' symbol) (Note: Bangladesh Jatiya Samajtantrik Dal's Mayeen Uddin Khan Badal ran as an Awami League candidate in Chittagong-8 and won the seat with 282,313 votes.)	63,805,379	74.96	257	43	300	+27
Bangladesh Nationalist Party (Note: The voting figures of the BNP do not include the votes for 25 candidates of allied registered parties who contested on the BNP 'sheaf of paddy' symbol)	9,985,202	11.73	6	1	7	+7
Jatiya Party	4,443,351	5.22	24	4	28	–12
Islami Andolan Bangladesh	1,255,373	1.47	0	0	0	–
Workers Party of Bangladesh (Note: WPB fielded three candidates on its 'hammer' election symbol, who received 1,729 votes, and five candidates on the Awami League 'boat' symbol, who received 644,335 votes.)	646,064	0.76	2	1	3	–4
Jatiya Samajtantrik Dal (Note: JASAD fielded nine candidates on its 'torch' election symbol, who received 39,104 votes, and three candidates on the Awami League 'boat' symbol, who received 570,940 votes.)	610,044	0.72	2	0	2	–4
Bikalpa Dhara Bangladesh (Note: Bikalpdhara Bangladesh fielded 23 candidates on its 'winnowing fan' election symbol, who received 18,183 votes, and three candidates on the Awami League 'boat' symbol, who received 547,757 votes.)	565,940	0.66	2	0	2	+2
Gano Forum (Note: GaFo fielded twenty candidates on its 'rising sun' election symbol, who received 103,535 votes, and seven candidates on the BNP 'sheaf of paddy' symbol, who received 398,202 votes.)	501,737	0.59	2	0	2	+2
Bangladesh Tarikat Federation (Note: Bangladesh Tarikat Federation fielded 16 candidates on its 'winnowing fan' election symbol, who received 6,087 votes, and two candidates on the Awami League 'boat' symbol, who received 423,868 votes.)	429,955	0.51	1	0	1	–1
Jamiat Ulema-e-Islam Bangladesh (Note: JUIB fielded five candidates on its 'date palm' election symbol, who received 2,351 votes, and three candidates on the BNP 'sheaf of paddy' symbol, who received 215,658 votes.)	218,009	0.26	0	0	0	–
Jatiya Party (Manju)	182,611	0.21	1	0	1	–1
Jatiya Samajtantrik Dal (Rab) (Note: JSD fielded fifteen candidates on its 'star' election symbol, who received 3,119 votes, and four candidates on the BNP 'sheaf of paddy' symbol, who received 152,867 votes.)	155,986	0.18	0	0	0	–
Krishak Sramik Janata League (Note: KSJL fielded five candidates on its 'gamchha' election symbol, who received 597 votes, and three candidates on the BNP 'sheaf of paddy' symbol, who received 143,518 votes.)	144,115	0.17	0	0	0	–
Khelafat Majlish (Note: KM fielded ten candidates on its 'wall-clock' election symbol, who received 11,203 votes, and two candidates on the BNP 'sheaf of paddy' symbol, who received 105,907 votes.)	117,110	0.14	0	0	0	–
Zaker Party	109,440	0.13	0	0	0	–
Bangladesh Islami Front	60,372	0.07	0	0	0	–
Communist Party of Bangladesh	55,421	0.07	0	0	0	–
Liberal Democratic Party (Note: LDP fielded four candidates on its 'umbrella' election symbol, who received 25,152 votes, and four candidates on the BNP 'sheaf of paddy' symbol, who received 28,879 votes.)	54,031	0.06	0	0	0	–
Bangladesh Kalyan Party (Note: BKP fielded one candidate on its 'wrist-watch' election symbol, who received 55 votes, and one candidate on the BNP 'sheaf of paddy' symbol, who received 44,381 votes.)	44,436	0.05	0	0	0	–
Bangladesh Jatiya Party (Note: BJP fielded two candidates on its 'cow cart' election symbol, who received 111 votes, and one candidate on the BNP 'sheaf of paddy' symbol, who received 38,639 votes.)	38,750	0.05	0	0	0	–
National People's Party	36,611	0.04	0	0	0	–
Islamic Front Bangladesh	31,468	0.04	0	0	0	–
Revolutionary Workers Party of Bangladesh (Note: Unregistered member political parties of the Left Democratic Alliance, like the Ganasamhati Andolan, fielded candidates on RWPB's 'hoe' election symbol.)	18,043	0.02	0	0	0	–
Socialist Party of Bangladesh	17,591	0.02	0	0	0	–
Bangladesh Muslim League (Note: Some unregistered political parties, most notably the Nationalist Democratic Movement (NDM) led by Bobby Hajjaj, contested under Muslim League's 'lantern' election symbol. The alliance of these parties held the name 'Gano Oikya Jote' (lit. Mass Unity Alliance).)	15,116	0.02	0	0	0	–
Bangladesh Nationalist Front	13,289	0.02	0	0	0	–1
Islami Oikya Jote	11,328	0.01	0	0	0	–
Bangladesh Khilafat Andolan	9,796	0.01	0	0	0	–
Bangladesh National Awami Party	8,367	0.01	0	0	0	–
Progressive Democratic Party	6,113	0.01	0	0	0	–
Gano Front	5,277	0.01	0	0	0	–
Bangladesh National Awami Party-Bangladesh NAP	5,176	0.01	0	0	0	–
Bangladesh Jatiya Party (Mukit)	4,606	0.01	0	0	0	–
Jatiya Ganotantrik Party	3,798	0.00	0	0	0	–
Bangladesh Khelafat Majlish	2,899	0.00	0	0	0	–
Ganatantri Party	1,641	0.00	0	0	0	–
Bangladesh Cultural Liberation Front (Muktijote)	1,219	0.00	0	0	0	–
Communist Party of Bangladesh (M-L)	387	0.00	0	0	0	–
Bangladesh Muslim League-BML	228	0.00	0	0	0	–
Independents	1,498,152	1.76	3	1	4	–15
Total	85,114,431	100.00	300	50	350	0
Valid votes	85,114,431	98.97				
Invalid/blank votes	887,690	1.03				
Total votes	86,002,121	100.00				
Registered voters/turnout	104,142,381	82.58				

=== By constituency ===
Parliamentary Constituency			Winner					Runner Up					Margin		Voter Turnout
#	Name	Total voters	Party	Alliance	Candidate	Votes	%	Party	Alliance	Candidate	Votes	%	In-votes	%	Voter Turnout
1	Panchagarh-1	379,207	AL	GA	Mazharul Haque Prodhan	173,888	55.11	BNP	JOF	Barrister Nawshad Jamir	132,539	42.00	41,349	13.10	84.54
2	Panchagarh-2	334,876	AL	GA	Md. Nurul Islam Sujon	169,514	59.28	BNP	JOF	Farhad Hossain Azad	111,095	38.85	58,419	20.43	86.18
3	Thakurgaon-1	422,342	AL	GA	Ramesh Chandra Sen	225,598	63.10	BNP	JOF	Mirza Fakhrul Islam Alamgir	128,080	35.82	97,718	27.33	85.75
4	Thakurgaon-2	273,433	AL	GA	Md Dobirul Islam	223,616	92.70	JeI	JOF	Md. Abdul Hakim	15,648	6.49	207,978	86.21	88.96
5	Thakurgaon-3	300,166	BNP	JOF	Md. Jahidur Rahman	88,510	36.75	Ind	None	Md. Emdadul Haque	84,395	35.04	4,115	1.71	81.25
6	Dinajpur-1	344,065	AL	GA	Manoranjon Shill Gopal	198,792	70.39	JeI	JOF	Mohammad Abu Hanif Al Kafi	78,928	27.95	119,864	42.44	83.35
7	Dinajpur-2	306,579	AL	GA	Khalid Mahmud Chowdhury	197,066	79.42	BNP	JOF	Md. Sadique Riaz	48,822	19.68	148,244	59.74	83.23
8	Dinajpur-3	349,569	AL	GA	Iqbalur Rahim	230,446	83.14	IAB	JOF	Md. Khairuzzaman	39,247	14.16	191,199	68.98	80.75
9	Dinajpur-4	342,887	AL	GA	Abul Hassan Mahmood Ali	203,866	76.19	BNP	JOF	Akhtaruzzaman Mia	61,706	23.06	142,160	53.13	79.56
10	Dinajpur-5	399,243	AL	GA	Mostafizur Rahman Fizar	188,680	58.65	BNP	JOF	A. Z. M. Rezwanul Haque	128,567	39.96	60,113	18.69	81.55
11	Dinajpur-6	466,244	AL	GA	Md. Shibli Sadique	281,891	79.38	JeI	JOF	Md. Anwarul Islam	69,769	19.65	212,122	59.73	77.61
12	Nilphamari-1	372,538	AL	GA	Md. Aftab Uddin Sarkar	188,784	61.53	BNP	JOF	Rafiqul Islam	88,791	28.94	99,993	32.59	83.37
13	Nilphamari-2	311,733	AL	GA	Asaduzzaman Noor	178,030	61.62	JeI	JOF	Md. Moniruzzaman Montu	80,283	30.49	97,747	37.13	85.30
14	Nilphamari-3	236,171	JP(E)	GA	Rana Mohammad Sohail	137,224	74.82	JeI	JOF	Md. Azizul Islam	44,093	24.04	93,131	50.78	78.26
15	Nilphamari-4	371,995	JP(E)	GA	Ahsan Adelur Rahman	236,930	86.38	IAB	None	Md Shahidul Islam	27,294	9.95	209,636	76.43	74.55
16	Lalmonirhat-1		AL	GA	Md Motahar Hossain	263,062		BNP	JOF	Md Hasan Rajib Pradhan	12,157		250,905		
17	Lalmonirhat-2		AL	GA	Nuruzzaman Ahmed	198,942		BNP	JOF	Md Rokon Uddin Babul	78,193		120,749		
18	Lalmonirhat-3		JP(E)	GA	Ghulam Muhammed Quader	149,641		BNP	JOF	Asadul Habib Dulu	80,225		69,416		
19	Rangpur-1		JP(E)	GA	Mashiur Rahaman Ranga	198,914		BNP	JOF	Md Rahmat Ullah	19,493		179,421		
20	Rangpur-2		AL	GA	Abul Kalam Md. Ahasanul Hoque Chowdhury	118,368		BNP	JOF	Mohammad Ali Sarkar	53,350		65,018		
21	Rangpur-3		JP(E)	GA	Hussain Muhammad Ershad	142,926		BNP	JOF	Rita Rahman	53,089		89,837		
22	Rangpur-4		AL	GA	Tipu Munshi	199,973		BNP	JOF	Md Emdadul Huq Bharosa	104,177		95,796		
23	Rangpur-5		AL	GA	H. N. Ashequr Rahman	244,758		JeI	JOF	Golam Rabbani	64,147		180,611		
24	Rangpur-6		AL	GA	Shirin Sharmin Chaudhury	234,426		BNP	JOF	Md Saiful Islam	24,053		210,373		
25	Kurigram-1		AL	GA	Md Aslam Hossain Saudagar	121,901		BNP	JOF	Saifur Rahman Rana	118,134		3,767		
26	Kurigram-2		JP(E)	GA	Ponir Uddin Ahmed	229,443		GaFo	JOF	AMSA Amin	107,146		122,297		
27	Kurigram-3		AL	GA	MA Matin	132,390		BNP	JOF	Tasvir Ul Islam	70,424		61,966		
28	Kurigram-4		AL	GA	Md Zakir Hossain	162,634		BNP	JOF	Azizur Rahman	55,960		106,674		
29	Gaibandha-1		JP(E)	GA	Shamim Haider Patwary	197,585		JeI	JOF	Mazedur Rahman Sarkar	65,173		132,412		
30	Gaibandha-2		AL	GA	Mahabub Ara Begum Gini	189,617		BNP	JOF	Md Abdur Rashid Sarkar	68,670		120,947		
31	Gaibandha-3		AL	GA	Eunus Ali Sarkar	121,163		JP(E)	None	Dilara Khandaker Shilpi	28,385		92,778		
32	Gaibandha-4		AL	GA	Md Monowar Hossain Chowdhury	300,860		JP(E)	None	Kazi Md Moshtiur Rahman	5,717		295,143		
33	Gaibandha-5		AL	GA	MD Fazle Rabbi Miah	242,861		BNP	JOF	Faruk Alam Sarkar	19,996		222,865		
34	Joypurhat-1		AL	GA	Shamsul Alam Dudu	219,825		Ind	JOF	Aleya Begum	84,212		135,613		
35	Joypurhat-2		AL	GA	Abu Sayeed Al Mahmood Swapon	228,730		BNP	JOF	AEM Khalilur Rahman	26,120		202,610		
36	Bogra-1		AL	GA	Abdul Mannan	268,768		BNP	JOF	Kazi Rafiqul Islam	16,613		252,155		
37	Bogra-2		AL	GA	Shariful Islam Jinnah	178,142		BNP	JOF	Mahmudur Rahman Manna	62,393		115,749		
38	Bogra-3		AL	GA	Md Nurul Islam Talukder	157,792		BNP	JOF	Masuda Momen	58,580		99,212		
39	Bogra-4		BNP	JOF	Md Mosharraf Hossain	128,585		JASAD	GA	A. K. M. Rezaul Karim Tansen	86,048		42,537		
40	Bogra-5		AL	GA	Habibur Rahman Habib	331,546		BNP	JOF	Golam Mohammad Siraj	49,777		281,769		
41	Bogra-6		BNP	JOF	Mirza Fakhrul Islam Alamgir	200,725		JP(E)	GA	Md Nurul Islam Omar	40,362		160,363		
42	Bogra-7		Ind	JOF	Rezaul Karim Bablu	190,299		Ind	None	Mst Ferdous Ara Khan	65,292		125,007		
43	Chapai Nawabganj-1		AL	GA	Shamil Uddin Ahmed Shimul	180,078		BNP	JOF	Md Shahjahan Miah	163,650		16,428		
44	Chapai Nawabganj-2		BNP	JOF	Md. Aminul Islam	175,466		AL	GA	Md. Ziaur Rahman	139,952		35,514		
45	Chapai Nawabganj-3		BNP	JOF	Md Harunur Rashid	133,661		AL	GA	Md. Abdul Odud	85,938		47,723		
46	Naogaon-1		AL	GA	Sadhan Chandra Majumder	187,290		BNP	JOF	Md Saleque Chowdhury	142,056		45,234		
47	Naogaon-2		AL	GA	Md Shahiduzzaman Sarker	172,131		BNP	JOF	Md Shamsuzzoha Khan	100,665		71,466		
48	Naogaon-3		JP(E)	GA	Md Salim Uddin Tarafder	190,581		BNP	JOF	Parvej Arefin Siddique	136,023		54,558		
49	Naogaon-4		AL	GA	Md Emaz Uddin Pramanik	168,845		BNP	JOF	AHM Shamsul Alam Pramanik	53,044		115,801		
50	Naogaon-5		AL	GA	Nizam Uddin Jalil John	156,965		BNP	JOF	Md Jahidul Islam Dholu	83,759		73,206		
51	Naogaon-6		AL	GA	Md Israfil Alam	189,864		BNP	JOF	Alamgir Kabir	46,150		143,714		
52	Rajshahi-1		JP(E)	GA	Omar Faruk Chowdhury	203,479		BNP	JOF	Md Aminul Haque	118,096		85,383		
53	Rajshahi-2		WPB	GA	Fazle Hossain Badsha	115,453		BNP	JOF	Md Mizanur Rahman Minu	103,327		12,126		
54	Rajshahi-3		JP(E)	GA	Md Ayeen Uddin	211,388		BNP	JOF	Mohammad Shafiqul Haque Milon	80,806		130,582		
55	Rajshahi-4		AL	GA	Enamul Haque	190,412		BNP	JOF	Md Abu Hena	14,157		176,255		
56	Rajshahi-5		AL	GA	Md Mansur Rahman	187,370		BNP	JOF	Prof Nazrul Islam	28,687		158,683		
57	Rajshahi-6		AL	GA	Md Shahriar Alam	202,104		JP(E)	None	Md Iqbal Hossain	4,162		197,942		
58	Natore-1		AL	GA	Shahidul Islam Bakul	246,440		BNP	JOF	Kamrun Nahar	15,338		231,102		
59	Natore-2		AL	GA	Md Shafiqul Islam Shimul	262,745		BNP	JOF	Sabina Yasmin	13,197		249,548		
60	Natore-3		AL	GA	Zunaid Ahmed Palak	230,327		BNP	JOF	Md Dauder Mahmud	8,841		221,486		
61	Natore-4		AL	GA	Md. Abdul Quddus	285,532		JP(E)	None	Md Alauddin Mridha	7,304		278,228		
62	Sirajganj-1		AL	GA	Mohammed Nasim	324,424		BNP	JOF	Romana Morshed Kanak Chapa	1,118		323,306		
63	Sirajganj-2		AL	GA	Md. Habibe Millat	291,859		BNP	JOF	Rumana Mahmood	13,758		278,101		
64	Sirajganj-3		AL	GA	Abdul Aziz	295,517		BNP	JOF	Abdul Mannan Talukder	27,248		268,269		
65	Sirajganj-4		AL	GA	Md Tanveer Imam	303,706		JeI	JOF	Md. Rafiqul Islam Khan	24,893		278,813		
66	Sirajganj-5		AL	GA	Abdul Momin Mondol	259,861		BNP	JOF	Md Amirul Islam Khan	28,317		231,544		
67	Sirajganj-6		AL	GA	Md Hashibur Rahman Swapon	335,759		BNP	JOF	M. A. Muhit	14,697		321,062		
68	Pabna-1		AL	GA	Md Shamsul Hoque Tuku	281,834		GF	JOF	Abu Sayeed	16,004		265,830		
69	Pabna-2		AL	GA	Ahmed Firoz Kabir	242,681		BNP	JOF	AKM Salim Reza Habib	5,383		237,298		
70	Pabna-3		AL	GA	Md Mokbul Hossain	284,752		BNP	JOF	K. M. Anowarul Islam	58,623		226,129		
71	Pabna-4		AL	GA	Shamsur Rahman Sherif	249,558		BNP	JOF	Md Habibur Rahman	48,822		200,736		
72	Pabna-5		AL	GA	Golam Faruk Khandakar Prince	321,458		JeI	JOF	Md. Iqbal Hossain	20,636		300,822		
73	Meherpur-1		AL	GA	Farhad Hossain	197097		BNP	JOF	Masud Arun	14192		182905		
74	Meherpur-2		AL	GA	Mohammad Shahiduzzaman	169314		BNP	JOF	Md Javed Masud	7792		161522		
75	Kushtia-1		AL	GA	AKM Sarwar Jahan Badsha	276675		BNP	JOF	Reza Ahmed	6103		270572		
76	Kushtia-2		JASAD	GA	Hasanul Haq Inu	280636		BNP	JOF	Mohammad Ahsan Habib Linkon	36777		243859		
77	Kushtia-3		AL	GA	Mahbubul Alam Hanif	296590		BNP	JOF	Md Jakir Hossain Sarker	14381		282209		
78	Kushtia-4		AL	GA	Selim Altaf Gorge	278818		BNP	JOF	Syed Mehedi Ahmed Rumi	12507		266311		
79	Chuadanga-1		AL	GA	Solaiman Haque Joarder	309993		BNP	JOF	Md Sharifuzzaman	23120		286873		
80	Chuadanga-2		AL	GA	Md. Ali Azgar	198937		BNP	JOF	Mahmud Hasan Khan	26924		172013		
81	Jhenaidah-1		AL	GA	Abdul Hyee	222019		BNP	JOF	Asaduzzaman	6668		215351		
82	Jhenaidah-2		AL	GA	Tahjib Alam Siddique	325886		IAB	None	Md Fakhrul Islam	9293		316593		
83	Jhenaidah-3		AL	GA	Md Shafiqul Azam Khan	242532		BNP	JOF	Md. Matiar Rahman	32249		210283		
84	Jhenaidah-4		AL	GA	Md. Anwarul Azim Anar	226369		BNP	JOF	Md Saiful Islam Firoz	9506		216890		
85	Jessore-1		AL	GA	Sheikh Afil Uddin	211443		BNP	JOF	Mofiqul Hasan Tripti	4981		206462		
86	Jessore-2		AL	GA	Md Nasir Uddin	325793		BNP	JOF	Abu Sayeed Md. Shahadat Hussain	13490		312303		
87	Jessore-3		AL	GA	Kazi Nabil Ahmed	361333		BNP	JOF	Anindya Islam Amit	31710		329623		
88	Jessore-4		AL	GA	Ranajit Kumar Roy	273234		BNP	JOF	TS Ayub	30874		242360		
89	Jessore-5		AL	GA	Swapan Bhattacharjee	282872		BNP	JOF	Muhammad Wakkas	24621		258251		
90	Jessore-6		AL	GA	Ismat Ara Sadek	156397		BNP	JOF	Md. Abul Hossain Azaz	5653		150744		
91	Magura-1		AL	GA	Md Saifuzzaman	269198		BNP	JOF	Md Monowar Hossain	16606		252592		
92	Magura-2		AL	GA	Biren Sikder	229659		BNP	JOF	Nitai Roy Chowdhury	52668		176991		
93	Narail-1		AL	GA	Md. Kabirul Haque	182529		BNP	JOF	Biswas Jahangir Alam	8919		173610		
94	Narail-2		AL	GA	Mashrafe Mortaza	271210		BNP	JOF	AZM Fariduzzaman	7883		263327		
95	Bagerhat-1		AL	GA	Sheikh Helal Uddin	252646		BNP	JOF	Md Sheikh Masud Rana	11485		241161		
96	Bagerhat-2		AL	GA	Sheikh Tonmoy	221212		BNP	JOF	MA Salam	4597		216615		
97	Bagerhat-3		AL	GA	Habibun Nahar	275799		JeI	JOF	Mohammad Abdul Wadud Sheikh	13475		262324		
98	Bagerhat-4		AL	GA	Mozammel Hossain	247941		IAB	None	A Mazid Hawladar	2471		245470		
99	Khulna-1		AL	GA	Panchanan Biswas	172152		BNP	JOF	Ameer Ejaz Khan	28332		143820		
100	Khulna-2		AL	GA	Sheikh Salahuddin Jewel	112100		BNP	JOF	Nazrul Islam Manju	27379		84721		
101	Khulna-3		AL	GA	Monnujan Sufian	134806		BNP	JOF	Rakibul Islam	23606		111200		
102	Khulna-4		AL	GA	Abdus Salam Murshedy	Won Uncontested									
103	Khulna-5		AL	GA	Narayan Chandra Chanda	231717		JeI	JOF	Mia Golam Porwar	32959		198758		
104	Khulna-6		AL	GA	Md Akhteruzzaman	284349		JeI	JOF	Md. Abul Kalam Azad	19257		265092		
105	Satkhira-1		AL	GA	Mustafa Lutfullah	332063		BNP	JOF	Md Habibul Islam Habib	17455		314608		
106	Satkhira-2		AL	GA	Mir Mostaque Ahmed Robi	155611		BNP	JOF	Abdul Khaleque Mondal	27711		127900		
107	Satkhira-3		AL	GA	AFM Ruhal Haque	303648		BNP	JOF	Md Shahidul Alam	24671		278977		
108	Satkhira-4		AL	GA	S. M. Jaglul Hayder	238387		BNP	JOF	Gazi Nazrul Islam	30486		207901		
109	Barguna-1		AL	GA	Dhirendra Debnath Shambhu	319957		BNP	JOF	Matiur Rahman Talukder	15344		304613		
110	Barguna-2		AL	GA	Showkat Hasanur Rahman Rimon	200325		BNP	JOF	Khondokar Mahbub Hossain	9518		190807		
111	Patuakhali-1		AL	GA	Shahjahan Mia	270970		IAB	None	Altafur Rahman	15103		255867		
112	Patuakhali-2		AL	GA	A. S. M. Feroz	185783		IAB	None	Md Nazrul Islam	9269		176514		
113	Patuakhali-3		AL	GA	SM Shahjada	217261		IAB	None	Kamal Khan	9009		208252		
114	Patuakhali-4		AL	GA	Muhibur Rahman Muhib	188781		IAB	None	Md Habibur Rahman Howlader	7251		181530		
115	Bhola-1		AL	GA	Tofail Ahmed	245409		IAB	None	Mawlana Mohammed Yasin	7801		237608		
116	Bhola-2		AL	GA	Ali Azam	225737		BNP	JOF	Hafiz Ibrahim	14214		211523		
117	Bhola-3		AL	GA	Nurunnabi Chowdhury	252214		IAB	None	Md Mosleh Uddin	41516		248063		
118	Bhola-4		AL	GA	Abdullah Al Islam Jacob	299074		IAB	None	Md Mohibullah	6481		292593		
119	Barisal-1		AL	GA	Abul Hasanat Abdullah	205502		IAB	None	Md Rasel Sardar	1415		204087		
120	Barisal-2		AL	GA	Md Shah-e-Alam	212344		BNP	JOF	Sardar Sarfuddin Ahmed	1137		201207		
121	Barisal-3		JP(E)	None	Golam Kibria Tipu	54778		BNP	JOF	Joynul Abedin	47287		7491		
122	Barisal-4		AL	GA	Pankaj Nath	241003		BNP	JOF	Nurur Rahman Jahangir	9282		231721		
123	Barisal-5		AL	GA	Zahid Faruk	215080		BNP	JOF	Majibur Rahman Sarwar	31362		183718		
124	Barisal-6		JP(E)	GA	Nasreen Jahan Ratna	159398		IAB	None	AKM Nurul Islam	14845		144553		
125	Jhalokati-1		AL	GA	Bazlul Haque Haroon	131483		BNP	JOF	Md Shahjahan Omar	6001		125482		
126	Jhalokati-2		AL	GA	Amir Hossain Amu	214937		IAB	None	Mufti Syed Md Fozlul Karim	9812		205125		
127	Pirojpur-1		AL	GA	SM Rezaul Karim	338610		BNP	JOF	Shameem Sayedee	8308		330302		
128	Pirojpur-2		JP(M)	GA	Anwar Hossain Manju	179425		BNP	JOF	Mostafizur Rahman Iran	6326		173099		
129	Pirojpur-3		JP(E)	GA	Md. Rustum Ali Faraji	135310		BNP	JOF	Md Ruhul Amin Dula	7698		127612		
130	Tangail-1		AL	GA	Mohammad Abdur Razzaque	280292		BNP	JOF	Shahidul Islam	16440		263852		
131	Tangail-2		AL	GA	Soto Monir	299948		BNP	JOF	Sultan Salahuddin Tuku	9889		290059		
132	Tangail-3		AL	GA	Ataur Rahman Khan	242437		BNP	JOF	Lutfor Rahman Khan Azad	9122		233315		
133	Tangail-4		AL	GA	Hasan Imam Khan	224012		KSJL	JOF	Md Liakat Ali	34388		189624		
134	Tangail-5		AL	GA	Md. Sanowar Hossain	149363		BNP	JOF	Mahmudul Hasan	78992		70370		
135	Tangail-6		AL	GA	Ahasanul Islam Titu	280227		BNP	JOF	Gautam Chakroborty	44559		235668		
136	Tangail-7		AL	GA	Khalid Mahmud Chowdhury	164591		BNP	JOF	Abul Kalam Azad Siddiqui	87949		76642		
137	Tangail-8		AL	GA	Joaherul Islam	207679		KSJL	JOF	Kuri Siddiqui	71144		136535		
138	Jamalpur-1		AL	GA	Abul Kalam Azad	274605		IAB	None	A Majid	5224		269381		
139	Jamalpur-2		AL	GA	Md Faridul Haq Khan	180418		BNP	JOF	AE Sultan Mahmud Babu	16721		163697		
140	Jamalpur-3		AL	GA	Mirza Azam	385113		BNP	JOF	Mostafizur Rahman Babul	4677		380436		
141	Jamalpur-4		AL	GA	Md Murad Hasan	217198		JP(E)	None	Md Mokhlesur Rahman	1593		215605		
142	Jamalpur-5		AL	GA	Mozaffar Hossain	373909		BNP	JOF	Shah Md Wares Ali Mamun	30974		342935		
143	Sherpur-1		AL	GA	Md. Atiur Rahman Atik	287452		BNP	JOF	Sansila Zebrin	27643		259809		
144	Sherpur-2		AL	GA	Matia Chowdhury	300442		BNP	JOF	Fahim Chowdhury	7652		292790		
145	Sherpur-3		AL	GA	A. K. M. Fazlul Haque	251936		BNP	JOF	Md Mahmudul Haque Rubel	12491		239445		
146	Mymensingh-1		AL	GA	Jewel Areng	203866		BNP	JOF	Afzal H. Khan	28638		230285		
147	Mymensingh-2		AL	GA	Sharif Ahmed	291472		BNP	JOF	Shah Shahid Sarwar	62233		229239		
148	Mymensingh-3		AL	GA	Nazim Uddin Ahmed	159300		BNP	JOF	M. Iqbal Hossain	24519		134781		
149	Mymensingh-4		JP(E)	GA	Rowshan Ershad	243497		BNP	JOF	Md. Abu Wahab Akanda Wahid	103950		139547		
150	Mymensingh-5		AL	GA	K. M. Khalid	232563		BNP	JOF	Mohammad Zakir Hossain	22203		210360		
151	Mymensingh-6		AL	GA	Moslem Uddin	240585		BNP	JOF	Shamsuddin Ahmed	32332		208253		
152	Mymensingh-7		AL	GA	Md Hafez Ruhul Amin Madani	204734		BNP	JOF	Dr Mahbubur Rahman	36408		168326		
153	Mymensingh-8		JP(E)	GA	Fakhrul Imam	156769		GF	JOF	AHM Khalekuzzaman	34063		122706		
154	Mymensingh-9		AL	GA	Anwarul Abedin Khan	227048		BNP	JOF	Khurram Khan Chowdhury	20858		206190		
155	Mymensingh-10		AL	GA	Fahmi Gulandaz Babel	281230		LDP	JOF	Syed Mahmud Morshed	3175		278055		
156	Mymensingh-11		AL	GA	Kazim Uddin Ahmed	222248		BNP	JOF	Fakhruddin Ahmed Bachchu	27277		194971		
157	Netrokona-1		AL	GA	Manu Majumdar	249738		BNP	JOF	Kayser Kamal	16332		233406		
158	Netrokona-2		AL	GA	Ashraf Ali Khan Khasru	283180		BNP	JOF	Md Anwarul Hoque	30370		252810		
159	Netrokona-3		AL	GA	Ashim Kumar Ukil	270144		BNP	JOF	Rafiqul Islam Helali	6715		263429		
160	Netrokona-4		AL	GA	Rebecca Momin	204443		BNP	JOF	Tahmina Zaman	38181		166262		
161	Netrokona-5		AL	GA	Waresat Hussain Belal	166475		BNP	JOF	Md Abu Taher Talukdar	15638		150837		
162	Kishoreganj-1		AL	GA	Sayed Ashraful Islam	259470		BNP	JOF	Md Rezaul Karim Khan	71433		188037		
163	Kishoreganj-2		AL	GA	Nur Mohammad	295860		BNP	JOF	Major Akhtaruzzaman	51323		244537		
164	Kishoreganj-3		JP(E)	GA	Mujibul Haque	239616		JSD (Rab)	JOF	Professor Md Saiful Islam	31786		207830		
165	Kishoreganj-4		AL	GA	Rejwan Ahammad Taufiq	258518		BNP	JOF	Md Fazlur Rahman	4936		253582		
166	Kishoreganj-5		AL	GA	Md. Afzal Hossain	202876		BNP	JOF	Sheikh Mujibar Rahman Iqbal	29150		173726		
167	Kishoreganj-6		AL	GA	Nazmul Hassan	247933		BNP	JOF	Md Shariful Alam	28084		219849		
168	Manikganj-1		AL	GA	Naimur Rahman	253151		BNP	JOF	Khondker Abdul Hamid	58182		194969		
169	Manikganj-2		AL	GA	Momtaz Begum	272521		BNP	JOF	Moinul Islam Khan	49883		222638		
170	Manikganj-3		AL	GA	Zahid Maleque	220595		GF	JOF	Mofizul Islam Khan Kamal	29904		190691		
171	Munshiganj-1		BDB	GA	Mahi B. Chowdhury	286681		BNP	JOF	Shah Moazzem Hossain	44888		241793		
172	Munshiganj-2		AL	GA	Sagufta Yasmin Emily	213983		BNP	JOF	Mizanur Rahman Sinha	14187		199796		
173	Munshiganj-3		AL	GA	Mrinal Kanti Das	313356		BNP	JOF	Abdul Hai	12736		300620		
174	Dhaka-1		AL	GA	Salman F Rahman	211443		Ind	JOF	Salma Islam	4981		206462		
175	Dhaka-2		AL	GA	Qamrul Islam	339581		BNP	JOF	Irfan Ibne Aman Omi	47195		292386		
176	Dhaka-3		AL	GA	Nasrul Hamid	221351		BNP	JOF	Gayeshwar Chandra Roy	16612		204739		
177	Dhaka-4		JP(E)	GA	Sayed Abu Hossain Babla	106959		BNP	JOF	Salah Uddin Ahmed	33117		242360		
178	Dhaka-5		AL	GA	Habibur Rahman Mollah	220083		BNP	JOF	Md Nabiullah	67572		152511		
179	Dhaka-6		JP(E)	GA	Kazi Firoz Rashid	93552		GF	JOF	Shubrata Chowdhury	23690		69592		
180	Dhaka-7		AL	GA	Haji Mohammad Salim	173687		GF	JOF	Mostafa Mohsin Montu	51672		122015		
181	Dhaka-8		WPB	GA	Rashed Khan Menon	139538		BNP	JOF	Mirza Abbas	38717		100821		
182	Dhaka-9		AL	GA	Saber Hossain Chowdhury	224230		BNP	JOF	Afroza Abbas	59165		165065		
183	Dhaka-10		AL	GA	Sheikh Fazle Noor Taposh	168172		BNP	JOF	Abdul Mannan	43831		124341		
184	Dhaka-11		AL	GA	A.K.M. Rahmatullah	186681		BNP	JOF	Shamim Ara Begum	54721		131960		
185	Dhaka-12		AL	GA	Asaduzzaman Khan	191895		BNP	JOF	Saiful Alam Nirob	32678		159217		
186	Dhaka-13		AL	GA	Md. Sadek Khan			BNP	JOF	Md. Sadek Khan	47232				
187	Dhaka-14		AL	GA	Aslamul Haque	197130		BNP	JOF	Sayed Abu Bakar Siddique	54981		142149		
188	Dhaka-15		AL	GA	Kamal Ahmed Majumder	175165		BNP	JOF	Md. Shafiqur Rahman	39071		136094		
189	Dhaka-16		AL	GA	Md Elias Uddin Mollah	175536		BNP	JOF	Ahsan Ullah Hasan	53537		121999		
190	Dhaka-17		AL	GA	Akbar Hossain Pathan Farooque	164610		BJP	JOF	Andaleeve Rahman	38639		125971		
191	Dhaka-18		AL	GA	Sahara Khatun	302006		JSD(Rab)	JOF	Shaheed Uddin Mahmud	71792		230214		
192	Dhaka-19		AL	GA	Md. Enamur Rahaman	490524		BNP	JOF	Dewan Md. Salauddin	69876		420648		
193	Dhaka-20		AL	GA	Benzir Ahmed	259788		IAB	None	Md. Abdul Mannan	7268		252520		
194	Gazipur-1		AL	GA	AKM Mozzamel Haque	401518		BNP	JOF	Chowdhury Tanbir Ahmed Siddiky	94723		306795		
195	Gazipur-2		AL	GA	Zahid Ahsan Russel	412140		BNP	JOF	Md Salah Uddin Sarker	101040		311100		
196	Gazipur-3		AL	GA	Iqbal Hossain Sabuj	343320		KSJL	JOF	Iqbal Siddiqui	37789		305534		
197	Gazipur-4		AL	GA	Simeen Hussain Rimi	203258		BNP	JOF	Shah Riajul Hannan	18582		184676		
198	Gazipur-5		AL	GA	Meher Afroz Chumki	207699		BNP	JOF	AKM Fazlul Haque Milon	27976		179723		
199	Narsingdi-1		AL	GA	Muhammad Nazrul Islam	271048		BNP	JOF	Khairul Kabir Khokon	24787		246261		
200	Narsingdi-2		AL	GA	Anwarul Ashraf Khan	175711		BNP	JOF	Abdul Moyeen Khan	7180		168531		
201	Narsingdi-3		AL	GA	Zahirul Haque Bhuiyan Mohan	94035		Ind	JOF	Md. Shirajul Islam Mollah	52876		41159		
202	Narsingdi-4		AL	GA	Nurul Majid Mahmud Humayun	256524		BNP	JOF	Sardar Shakhawat Hossain Bokul	16505		240019		
203	Narsingdi-5		AL	GA	Rajiuddin Ahmed Raju	294484		BNP	JOF	Md Ashraf Uddin	20431		274053		
204	Narayanganj-1		AL	GA	Golam Dastagir Gazi	243739		BNP	JOF	Kazi Moniruzzaman	16434		227305		
205	Narayanganj-2		AL	GA	Nazrul Islam Babu	232722		BNP	JOF	Nazrul Islam Azad	5012		22710		
206	Narayanganj-3		JP(E)	GA	Liyakot Hossain Khoka	197785		BNP	JOF	Md Azharul Islam Mannan	18047		179738		
207	Narayanganj-4		AL	GA	Shamim Osman	393136		BNP	JOF	Monir Hossein	76582		316554		
208	Narayanganj-5		JP(E)	GA	Salim Osman	279545		BNP	JOF	S. M. Akram	52352		227193		
209	Rajbari-1		AL	GA	Kazi Keramat Ali	238914		BNP	JOF	Ali Newaz Mahmud Khaiyam	33000		205914		
210	Rajbari-2		AL	GA	Md. Zillul Hakim	398974		BNP	JOF	Nasirul Haque Sabu	5475		393499		
211	Faridpur-1		AL	GA	Manjur Hossain	304607		BNP	JOF	Shah Mohammad Abu Zafar	27305		277302		
212	Faridpur-2		AL	GA	Syeda Sajeda Chowdhury	218385		BNP	JOF	Chowdhury Nayab Yusuf	14910		203475		
213	Faridpur-3		AL	GA	Khandaker Mosharraf Hossain	276271		BNP	JOF	Chowdhury Kamal Ibne Yusuf	21704		254567		
214	Faridpur-4		Ind	None	Mujibur Rahman Chowdhury	144179		AL	GA	Kazi Zafarullah	94234		49945		
215	Gopalganj-1		AL	GA	Faruk Khan	303162		IAB	None	Md Mizanur Rahman	902		302260		
216	Gopalganj-2		AL	GA	Sheikh Fazlul Karim Selim	281904		IAB	None	Taslim Sikder	628		281276		
217	Gopalganj-3		AL	GA	Sheikh Hasina	229659		BNP	JOF	SM Jilani	123		229416		
218	Madaripur-1		AL	GA	Noor-E-Alam Chowdhury Liton	227393		BNP	JOF	Sazzad Hossain Sidiquee	313		227080		
219	Madaripur-2		AL	GA	Shajahan Khan	311740		BNP	JOF	Milton Baidya	2588		309152		
220	Madaripur-3		AL	GA	Abdus Sobhan Golap	252461		BNP	JOF	Anisur Rahman Talukder	3296		249165		
221	Shariatpur-1		AL	GA	Iqbal Hossain Apu	272939		IAB	None	Md Tofayel Ahmed	1427		271512		
222	Shariatpur-2		AL	GA	AKM Enamul Haque Shamim	273171		BNP	JOF	Safiqur Rahman Kiran	2213		270958		
223	Shariatpur-3		AL	GA	Nahim Razzaq	207229		IAB	None	Md Hanif Mia	2735		204494		
224	Sunamganj-1		AL	GA	Moazzem Hossain Ratan	265926		BNP	JOF	Nozir Hossain	72537		193389		
225	Sunamganj-2		AL	GA	Joya Sengupta	124017		BNP	JOF	Md Nasir Chowdhury	67587		56430		
226	Sunamganj-3		AL	GA	MA Mannan	163149		JUI(B)	JOF	Shahinur Pasha Chowdhury	52925		110224		
227	Sunamganj-4		JP(E)	GA	Pir Fazlur Rahman	137289		BNP	JOF	Fazlul Haque Aspia	69749		67540		
228	Sunamganj-5		AL	GA	Mohibur Rahman Manik	221328		BNP	JOF	Md Mizanur Rahman Chowdhuri	89642		131686		
229	Sylhet-1		AL	GA	AK Abdul Momen	298696		BNP	JOF	Khandeker Abdul Moqtadir	123851		174845		
230	Sylhet-2		GF	JOF	Mokabbir Khan	69420		Ind	None	Muhibur Rahman	30449		38971		
231	Sylhet-3		AL	GA	Mahmud Us Samad Chowdhury	176587		IAB	JOF	Shafi Ahmed Chowdhury	83288		93299		
232	Sylhet-4		AL	GA	Imran Ahmad	223672		BNP	JOF	Dildar Hossain Selim	93448		130224		
233	Sylhet-5		AL	GA	Hafiz Ahmed Mazumder	139735		JUI(B)	JOF	Obaidul Faruk	86151		53584		
234	Sylhet-6		AL	GA	Nurul Islam Nahid	196215		BNP	JOF	Foysal Ahmed Chowdhury	108089		88126		
235	Moulvibazar-1		AL	GA	Md. Shahab Uddin	144595		BNP	JOF	Nasiruddin Ahmed	67345		77250		
236	Moulvibazar-2		GF	JOF	Sultan Mohammad Mansur Ahmed	79742		BDB	GA	MM Shahin	77170		2572		
237	Moulvibazar-3		AL	GA	Nesar Ahmed	184579		BNP	JOF	M. Naser Rahman	104565		79984		
238	Moulvibazar-4		AL	GA	Md. Abdus Shahid	211613		BNP	JOF	Mujibur Rahman Chowdhury	93295		118318		
239	Habiganj-1		AL	GA	Gazi Mohammad Shahnawaz	158188		GF	JOF	Reza Kibria	85197		72991		
240	Habiganj-2		AL	GA	Md. Abdul Majid Khan	179480		BKM	JOF	Mawlana Abdul Basit Azad	59724		119756		
241	Habiganj-3		AL	GA	Md. Abu Zahir	193973		BNP	JOF	Md GK Gous	68078		125895		
242	Habiganj-4		AL	GA	Md. Mahbub Ali	306953		BKM	JOF	Ahmad Abdul Quader	45151		261802		
243	Brahmanbaria-1		AL	GA	Bodruddoza Md. Farhad Hossain	101110		BNP	JOF	SAK Ekramuzzaman	60738		40372		
244	Brahmanbaria-2		BNP	JOF	Abdus Sattar Bhuiyan	83997		Ind	None	Md Moyeen Uddin	75419		8578		
245	Brahmanbaria-3		AL	GA	R. A. M. Obaidul Muktadir Chowdhury	393523		BNP	JOF	Khaled Hossain Mahbub Shyamol	86077		307446		
246	Brahmanbaria-4		AL	GA	Anisul Huq	282062		IAB	None	Md Jashim	2949		279113		
247	Brahmanbaria-5		AL	GA	Mohammad Ebadul Karim Bulbul	251522		BNP	JOF	Kazi Nazmul Hossain	17011		234511		
248	Brahmanbaria-6		AL	GA	AB Tajul Islam	200078		BNP	JOF	Abdul Khaleque	1329		198749		
249	Comilla-1		AL	GA	Mohammad Shubid Ali Bhuiyan	135873		BNP	JOF	Dr Khandaker Mosharraf Hossain	95542		40331		
250	Comilla-2		AL	GA	Selima Ahmad	206016		BNP	JOF	Dr Khandaker Mosharraf Hossain	20933		185083		
251	Comilla-3		AL	GA	Yussuf Abdullah Harun	273182		BNP	JOF	KM Mujibul Haque	12358		260824		
252	Comilla-4		AL	GA	Razee Mohammad Fakhrul	240544		JSD(Rab)	JOF	Abdul Malek Ratan	7958		232586		
253	Comilla-5		AL	GA	Abdul Matin Khasru	290547		BNP	JOF	Mohammad Yunus	12113		278434		
254	Comilla-6		AL	GA	A. K. M. Bahauddin	296300		BNP	JOF	Mohammad Aminur Rashid	18537		277763		
255	Comilla-7		AL	GA	Ali Ashraf	184901		LDP	JOF	Redwan Ahmed	15747		169154		
256	Comilla-8		JP(E)	GA	Nasimul Alam Chowdhury	188659		BNP	JOF	Zakaria Taher Sumon	34219		154440		
257	Comilla-9		AL	GA	Md. Tajul Islam	270602		BNP	JOF	Md Anwarul Azim	11309		259293		
258	Comilla-10		AL	GA	A. H. M. Mustafa Kamal	405299		BNP	JOF	Monirul Haq Chowdhury	12488		392811		
259	Comilla-11		AL	GA	Mujibul Haque Mujib	282003		IAB	JOF	Md. Kamal Uddin Bhuiyan	2264		279739		
260	Chandpur-1		AL	GA	Muhiuddin Khan Alamgir	196844		BNP	JOF	Mosharraf Hossain	7759		189085		
261	Chandpur-2		AL	GA	Nurul Amin Ruhul	301050		BNP	JOF	Md Jalal Uddin	10277		290773		
262	Chandpur-3		AL	GA	Dipu Moni	304812		BNP	JOF	Sheikh Farid Ahmed Manik	35501		269311		
263	Chandpur-4		AL	GA	Muhammad Shafiqur Rahman	173369		BNP	JOF	Harunur Rashid	30799		142570		
264	Chandpur-5		AL	GA	Major (Retd) Rafiqul Islam Bir Uttom	301648		BNP	JOF	Md Mominul Haque	37195		264453		
265	Feni-1		JASAD	GA	Shirin Akhter	204256		BNP	JOF	Munshi Rafiqul Islam	25494		178762		
266	Feni-2		AL	GA	Nizam Uddin Hazari	290668		BNP	JOF	Joynal Abedin	5748		284884		
267	Feni-3		JP(E)	GA	Masud Uddin Chowdhury	288077		BNP	JOF	Akbar Hossain	14674		273403		
268	Noakhali-1		AL	GA	H. M. Ibrahim	238970		BNP	JOF	Mahbub Uddin Khokon	14862		224108		
269	Noakhali-2		AL	GA	Morshed Alam	238970		BNP	JOF	Zainul Abdin Farroque	14862		224108		
270	Noakhali-3		AL	GA	Md. Mamunur Rashid Kiron	217829		BNP	JOF	Barkat Ullah Bulu	53790		164039		
271	Noakhali-4		AL	GA	Ekramul Karim Chowdhury	240544		BNP	JOF	Md. Shahjahan	7958		232586		
272	Noakhali-5		AL	GA	Obaidul Quader	252744		BNP	JOF	Moudud Ahmed	10970		241774		
273	Noakhali-6		AL	GA	Ayesha Ferdaus	210015		BNP	JOF	Mohammad Fazlul Azim	4715		205300		
274	Lakshmipur-1		AL	GA	Anwar Hossain Khan	185438		LDP	JOF	Shahadat Hossain Selim	3893		181545		
275	Lakshmipur-2		Ind	GA	Mohammad Shahid Islam	256784		BNP	JOF	Abul Khair Bhuiyan	28065		228719		
276	Lakshmipur-3		AL	GA	A.K.M. Shahjahan Kamal	233728		BNP	JOF	Shahiduddin Chowdhury Annie	14492		219236		
277	Lakshmipur-4		BDB	GA	Abdul Mannan	183906		JSD(Rab)	JOF	A. S. M. Abdur Rab	40993		142913		
278	Chittagong-1		AL	GA	Mosharraf Hossain	266666		BNP	JOF	Nurul Amin	3991		262675		
279	Chittagong-2		BTF	GA	Syed Najibul Bashar Maizbhandari	238430		BNP	JOF	Md Azimullah Bahar	49753		188677		
280	Chittagong-3		AL	GA	Mahfuzur Rahaman	162356		BNP	JOF	Mostafa Kamal Pasha	3122		159234		
281	Chittagong-4		AL	GA	Didarul Alam	266118		BNP	JOF	Aslam Chowdhury	30014		236104		
282	Chittagong-5		JP(E)	GA	Anisul Islam Mahmud	277909		BKP	JOF	Syed Muhammad Ibrahim	44381		233528		
283	Chittagong-6		AL	GA	A.B.M. Fazle Karim Chowdhury	230471		BNP	JOF	Jashim Uddin Shikder	2244		150744		
284	Chittagong-7		AL	GA	Moin Uddin Khan Badal	272838		LDP	JOF	Abu Sufiyan	59135		213703		
285	Chittagong-8		AL	GA	Moin Uddin Khan Badal	272838		BNP	JOF	Abu Sufiyan	59135		213703		
286	Chittagong-9		AL	GA	Mohibul Hasan Chowdhury	223614		BNP	JOF	Shahadat Hossain	17642		205972		
287	Chittagong-10		AL	GA	Muhammad Afsarul Ameen	287047		BNP	JOF	Abdullah Al Noman	41390		245657		
288	Chittagong-11		AL	GA	M. Abdul Latif	283169		BNP	JOF	Amir Khasru Mahmud Chowdhury	52898		230271		
289	Chittagong-12		AL	GA	Shamsul Haque Chowdhury	183179		BNP	JOF	Md. Enamul Haque	44598		138581		
290	Chittagong-13		AL	GA	Saifuzzaman Chowdhury	243415		BNP	JOF	Sarwar Jamal Nizam	3153		240262		
291	Chittagong-14		AL	GA	Md. Nazrul Islam Chowdhury	189186		LDP	JOF	Oli Ahmad	22225		166961		
292	Chittagong-15		AL	GA	Abu Reza Muhammad Nezamuddin	259375		JeI	JOF	A. N. M. Shamsul Islam	53986		205389		
293	Chittagong-16		AL	GA	Mustafizur Rahaman Chowdhury	175341		BNP	JOF	Zafrul Islam Chowdhury	26370		148971		
294	Cox's Bazar-1		AL	GA	Jafar Alam	273856		BNP	JOF	Hasina Ahmed	56601		217255		
295	Cox's Bazar-2		AL	GA	Asheq Ullah Rafiq	213091		JeI	JOF	A. H. M. Hamidur Rahman Azad	18587		194504		
296	Cox's Bazar-3		AL	GA	Shaimum Sarwar Kamal	253825		BNP	JOF	Lutfur Rahman Kajal	86718		167107		
297	Cox's Bazar-4		AL	GA	Shahin Akhtar	196974		BNP	JOF	Shahjahan Chowdhury	37018		159956		
298	Khagrachhari		AL	GA	Kujendra Lal Tripura	236156		Ind	None	Nutan Kumar Chakma	59257		176899		
299	Rangamati		AL	GA	Dipankar Talukdar	156844		Ind	None	Ushatan Talukder	94495		62349		
300	Bandarban		AL	GA	Bir Bahadur Ushwe Sing	143966		BNP	JOF	Saching Prue Jerry	58719		85247		

== Reactions ==
- The Fifth King of Bhutan and Prime Minister of Bhutan Lotay Tshering congratulated Hasina and her party in a written message of congratulation.
- Chinese President Xi Jinping and Prime Minister of China Li Keqiang greeted Sheikh Hasina on a landslide victory.
- Prime Minister of India Narendra Modi congratulated Hasina on the landslide victory.
- Prime Minister of Nepal Khadga Prasad Oli congratulated Hasina on the victory.
- Palestinian President Mahmoud Abbas congratulated Hasina on her party's victory in a telephone call .
- The Emir congratulated Hasina in a written message of congratulation.
- President Vladimir Putin congratulated Hasina in a written message of congratulation.
- The King and Crown Prince congratulated Hasina and her party in a written message of congratulation.
- The President and Prime Minister of Sri Lanka greeted Sheikh Hasina on a landslide victory.

== See also ==
- List of members of the 11th Jatiya Sangsad
