= 2001 Bangladeshi general election =

- 1 October 2001

300 of the 345 seats in the Jatiya Sangsad 151 seats needed for a majority
- Registered: 74,946,364
- Turnout: 74.97% (▼0.63pp)
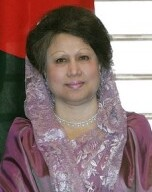

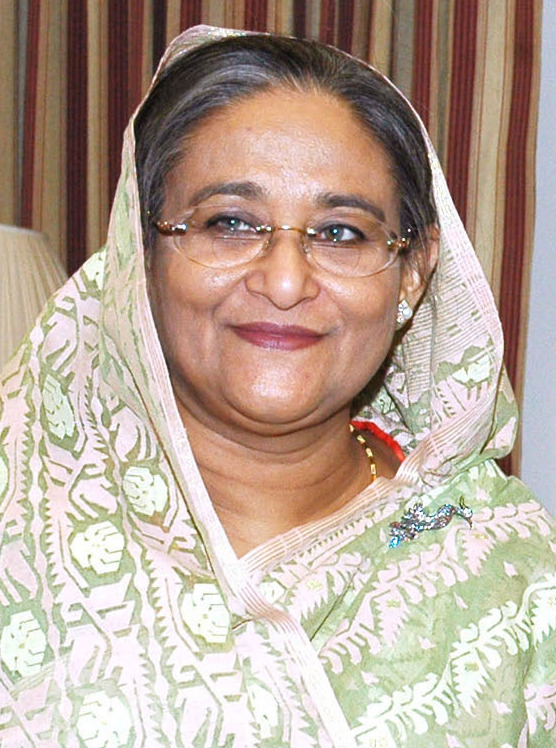

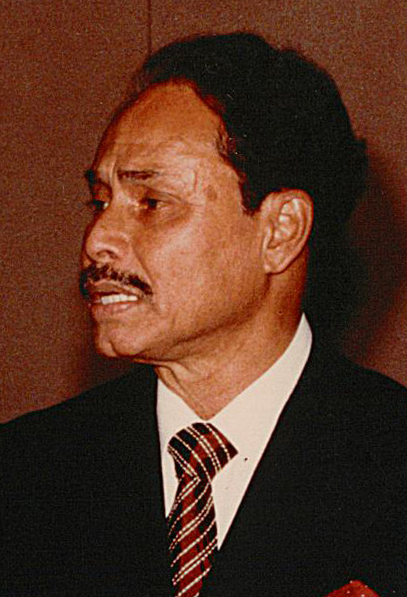
	First party	Second party
Leader	Khaleda Zia	Sheikh Hasina
Party	BNP	AL
Alliance	Four Party
Last election	33.61%, 116 seats	37.44%, 146 seats
Seats won	193	62
Seat change	▲77	▼84
Popular vote	23,074,714	22,310,276
Percentage	40.97%	40.13%
Swing	▲7.36pp	▲2.69pp
	Third party	Fourth party
Leader	H.M. Ershad	Motiur Rahman Nizami
Party	JP(E)	Jamaat
Alliance	IJOF	Four Party
Last election	16.40%, 32 seats	8.61%, 3 seats
Seats won	14	17
Seat change	▼18	▲14
Popular vote	4,038,453	2,385,361
Percentage	7.25%	4.28%
Swing	▼9.15pp	▼4.32pp
- Results by constituency
Chief Adviser before election
Latifur Rahman
Independent (caretaker)
Prime Minister after election
Khaleda Zia
BNP

General elections were held in Bangladesh on 1 October 2001. The 300 seats of the Jatiya Sangsad were contested by 1,935 candidates representing 54 parties and 484 independents. The elections were the second to be held under the caretaker government concept, introduced in 1996.

The result was a victory for the Four Party Alliance of the Bangladesh Nationalist Party (BNP), Jamaat-e-Islami Bangladesh, Jatiya Party (Manju), and Islami Oikya Jote. BNP leader Khaleda Zia became prime minister.

The election was a loss for the Awami League (AL). The main issues of the election revolved around the performance of the incumbent Sheikh Hasina/AL government. The AL argued that it had overseen a strong economic performance, while political opponents highlighted organized crime, corruption, and violence, and accused the AL of acting subordinate to the Indian government.

== Background ==
The Seventh Parliament, headed by Prime Minister Sheikh Hasina, was dissolved on 13 July 2001, having completed its designated 5-year term (the first parliamentary administration to ever do so), and power was transferred to the caretaker government headed by Justice Latifur Rahman.

Shortly after being sworn in as Chief Advisor, Latifur Rahman initiated a major administrative reshuffle, removing 13 secretaries, including the Principal Secretary to the Prime Minister's Office. The move generated significant public and political discussion at the time. The BNP demanded a crackdown on illegal arms and the arrest of criminals prior to the general election. During a meeting with journalists, BNP Chairperson Khaleda Zia expressed confidence in winning a two-thirds majority, or at the very least, a clear majority. The caretaker government soon launched a nationwide special operation, dividing the country into 68 sectors to carry out the campaign. Meanwhile, Awami League President Sheikh Hasina raised concerns about the neutrality of the caretaker government during the election campaign, accusing it of acting in alignment with BNP directives.

== Electoral system ==
The 300 members of the Jatiya Sangsad were elected by first-past-the-post voting in single-member constituencies. The law providing for 30 seats reserved for women had expired prior to the elections.

== Conduct ==
The international and national monitors declared the polling free and fair despite the Awami League alleging massive vote rigging by the BNP. The accusation was denied by the Chief Election Commissioner, who declared the charges "baseless". International observers from the European Union, the United Nations, and the Carter Center of former US President Jimmy Carter, also praised the heavy voter turnout, which was 75%.

== Results ==
The BNP was the clear winner in terms of seats, winning a secure majority with 193 of the 300 seats. BNP's allied parties Jamaat-e-Islami Bangladesh, Jatiya Party (Manju), and Islami Oikya Jote also won a combined 23 seats, bringing the alliance total to 216 seats. As a result of the first-past-the-post voting system in Bangladesh, Awami League only secured 62 seats, despite a difference in popular vote share of only ≈1.4%. Voter turnout was very high at 75%.

Of the 300 seats, only seven were won by women.

The results were highly disproportionate, with the BNP winning 131 more seats than the Awami League despite their popular vote total differing by less than one percentage point.

Party	Votes	%	Seats
Bangladesh Nationalist Party	22,833,978	40.97	193
Awami League	22,365,516	40.13	62
Islami Jatiya Oikya Front	4,038,453	7.25	14
Bangladesh Jamaat-e-Islami	2,385,361	4.28	17
Bangladesh Jatiya Party	621,772	1.12	4
Islami Oikya Jote	376,343	0.68	2
Krishak Sramik Janata League	261,344	0.47	1
Jatiya Party (Manju)	243,617	0.44	1
Jatiya Samajtantrik Dal	119,382	0.21	0
Communist Party of Bangladesh	56,991	0.10	0
Workers Party of Bangladesh	40,484	0.07	0
Bangladesh Islami Front	30,761	0.06	0
BASAD–Khalekuzzaman	21,164	0.04	0
Jamiat Ulema-e-Islam Bangladesh	19,256	0.03	0
Bangladesh Khilafat Andolan	13,472	0.02	0
Gano Forum	8,494	0.02	0
Islami Shasantantra Andolon	5,944	0.01	0
Liberal Party Bangladesh	3,976	0.01	0
National Awami Party (NAP)	3,801	0.01	0
Bangladesh Progressive Party	3,734	0.01	0
Ganatantri Party	3,190	0.01	0
Bangladesh Samajtantrik Dal	2,308	0.00	0
Bangladesh Janata Party	1,703	0.00	0
Bangladesh Krishak Sramik Mukti Andolon	1,248	0.00	0
Zaker Party	1,181	0.00	0
Bangladesh Peoples Congress	1,155	0.00	0
Communist Kendra	1,042	0.00	0
Communist Party of Bangladesh (Marxist–Leninist)	972	0.00	0
Bangladesh Hindu League	922	0.00	0
Gano Azadi League	780	0.00	0
Jatiyo Janata Party (Adv. Nurul Islam Khan)	657	0.00	0
Bangladesh Muslim League (Jamir Ali)	582	0.00	0
National Patriotic Party	551	0.00	0
National Awami Party (Bhashani)	442	0.00	0
Bangladesh Jatiya Tanti Dal	441	0.00	0
Samridha Bangladesh Andolon	429	0.00	0
Sramik Krishak Samajbadi Dal	391	0.00	0
Bangladesh Peoples Party	382	0.00	0
Desh Prem Party	366	0.00	0
Democratic Republican Party	364	0.00	0
Bangladesh Manabadhikar Dal	237	0.00	0
Bangladesh Krisak Sramik Janata Party	197	0.00	0
Liberal Democrats Party	170	0.00	0
Quran Darshan Sangstha Bangladesh	161	0.00	0
Jatiya Janata Party (Sheik Asad)	148	0.00	0
Pragatishil Ganotantrik Shakti	136	0.00	0
Sama-Samaj Ganotantri Party	131	0.00	0
National Awami Party (NAP-Bhashani Mushtaq)	79	0.00	0
Quran and Sunnah Bastabayan Party	77	0.00	0
Bhashani Front	76	0.00	0
Bangladesh Krishak Sramik Awami League	59	0.00	0
Bangladesh Bhashani Adarsha Bastabayan Parishad	58	0.00	0
Bangladesh Sarbahara Party	44	0.00	0
Jatiya Janata Party (Hafizur)	30	0.00	0
Independents	2,262,073	4.06	6
Total	55,736,625	100.00	300
Valid votes	55,736,625	99.20	
Invalid/blank votes	449,082	0.80	
Total votes	56,185,707	100.00	
Registered voters/turnout	74,946,364	74.97	
Source: ECB

== Aftermath ==
There were reports of violence targeting minority Hindus in the immediate wake of the elections.

With a clear majority, BNP leader Khaleda Zia was invited to form a government and, on 10 October 2001, was sworn in as prime minister and formed her Cabinet, which included members of her allied parties. The first sitting of the Eighth Parliament occurred on 28 October 2001 with Jamiruddin Sircar as its new speaker.

Awami League President Sheikh Hasina initially remained firm in her decision not to join the newly elected parliament. She rejected the election results, alleging large-scale rigging, and announced a half-day nationwide blockade along with other protest programmes. Quoting her, The Daily Sangbad reported her saying that the Four-Party Alliance had secured a two-thirds majority, making the AL's presence in parliament inconsequential, and that the party would continue its struggle to protect people's right to vote. The Awami League strongly criticized outgoing Chief Advisor Latifur Rahman, although in his farewell address, he maintained that his caretaker government had acted impartially. While Awami League MPs eventually took their oaths, the party did not immediately decide on joining parliamentary sessions. Hasina alleged that Awami League leaders, activists, and minorities across the country were being targeted with violence, killings, and looting by ruling party supporters. Amidst continuing political tensions, the Awami League ultimately decided to join parliament.

In 2004, a constitutional amendment was passed reinstating the reserved seats for women and increasing the number from 30 to 45. The seats were now allocated based on the proportion of seats won by each party rather than being elected by directly elected MPs. The reserved seats were to be allocated on 6 September 2005, but the Awami League refused to nominate candidates for the nine seats the party was entitled to in protest at the seats not being directly elected. On 2 October, the nine vacant seats were reallocated, of which six went to the BNP. After the reallocation, the BNP had 36 reserved seats, Islami Jatiya Oikya Front four, Bangladesh Jamaat-e-Islami three, and the Bangladesh Jatiya Party and Islami Oikya Jote one each.

Zia's administration completed a full five-year term, running from 28 October 2001 to 27 October 2006. However, disputes over the selection of a caretaker government, with disagreements between the parties over their neutrality, led to the 2006–08 Bangladeshi political crisis, which eventually resulted in military intervention. New elections were not held until December 2008.
