= Grand Alliance (Bangladesh) =

Coalition of the Bangladesh Awami League and its allies

Grand Alliance মহাজোট
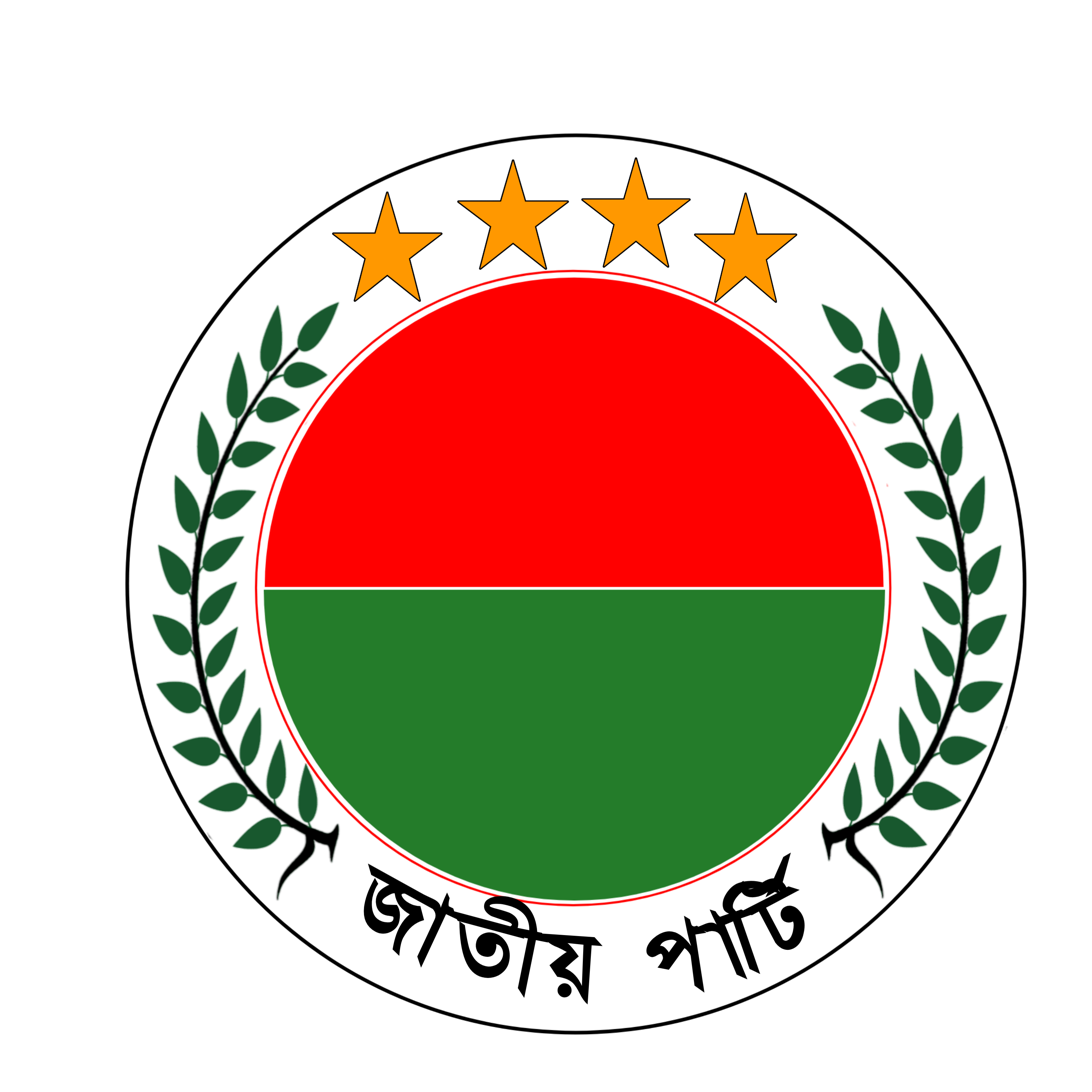
- মহাজোট; Grand Alliance
- Leader: Sheikh Hasina
- Coordinator: Amir Hossain Amu
- Founded: 2008
- Dissolved: 5 August 2024
- Headquarters: Dhaka
- National affiliation: 14 Party Alliance

The Grand Alliance (Bengali: মহাজোট) was a Bangladeshi big-tent electoral alliance of political parties with the leadership of Awami League. It was formed ahead of the 2008 general election. The alliance was a de facto merger of the 14 Party Alliance with the Jatiya Party and LDP, although the 14 Party Alliance remained active individually. The Grand Alliance was regularly reformed before elections.

== 14 Party Alliance ==
There is a common confusion that the 14 Party Alliance and the Grand Alliance were the same. While the 14 Party Alliance is the "idealistic" political alliance between the Awami League and secular-socialist parties, which is active in everyday politics, the Grand Alliance was a larger electoral alliance before elections.

== Aftermath ==
Following the ouster of the Awami League due to the July Uprising in August 2024 and its subsequent ban, the alliance has fallen into disarray. Many of its top leaders like Rashed Khan Menon and Hasanul Haq Inu were arrested on charges of murder and money laundering. Many members of the parties in the alliance have gone underground out of fear of vigilante mobs, indignant at their collaboration with the oppressive regime. A petition demanding a ban on the all parties of the Grand Alliance was filed in October 2024 by the student agitators but it was turned down by the Appellate Division.

== Parties ==
Party	Commencement	Termination
Awami League	2008	2024
Jatiya Samajtantrik Dal	2008	2024
Workers Party of Bangladesh	2008	2024
Jatiya Party (Manju)	2008	2024
Bangladesh Tarikat Federation	2008	2024
Ganatantri Party	2008	2024
Bangladesher Samyabadi Dal (ML) (Barua)	2008	2024
Bikalpa Dhara Bangladesh	2018	2024
Jatiya Party (Ershad)	2008	2019
Liberal Democratic Party	2008	2012

== Electoral history ==
=== Jatiya Sangsad ===
Election	Seats won	Change	Share of votes	Swing	Status
2008	263 / 300	New	56.45%	New	Government
2014	284 / 300	▲21	83.54%	▲27.09%	Government
2018	289 / 300	▲9	83.22%	▼0.32%	Government
2024	226 / 300	▼63	65.94%	▼17.28%	Government

== See also ==
- 20 Party Alliance
- Jatiya Oikya Front
