= Bangladesh National Awami Party (Bhashani) =

Political party in Bangladesh

Bangladesh National Awami Party (Bhashani) বাংলাদেশ ন্যাশনাল আওয়ামী পার্টি (ভাসানী)
- Abbreviation: BNAP
- Chairman: Jebel Rahman Ghaani
- General Secretary: M. Golam Mostafa Bhuiyan
- Founder: Shawfikul Ghaani Shawpan
- Founded: October 2006 (19 years ago)
- Split from: BNP
- Preceded by: NAP (Bhasani)
- Headquarters: 85/1, Masjid Gali, Naya Paltan, Dhaka
- Ideology: Bangladeshi nationalism Socialism (Bangladeshi)
- Political position: Left-wing
- Jatiya Sangsad: 0 / 300

Election symbol
- Cow

Party flag
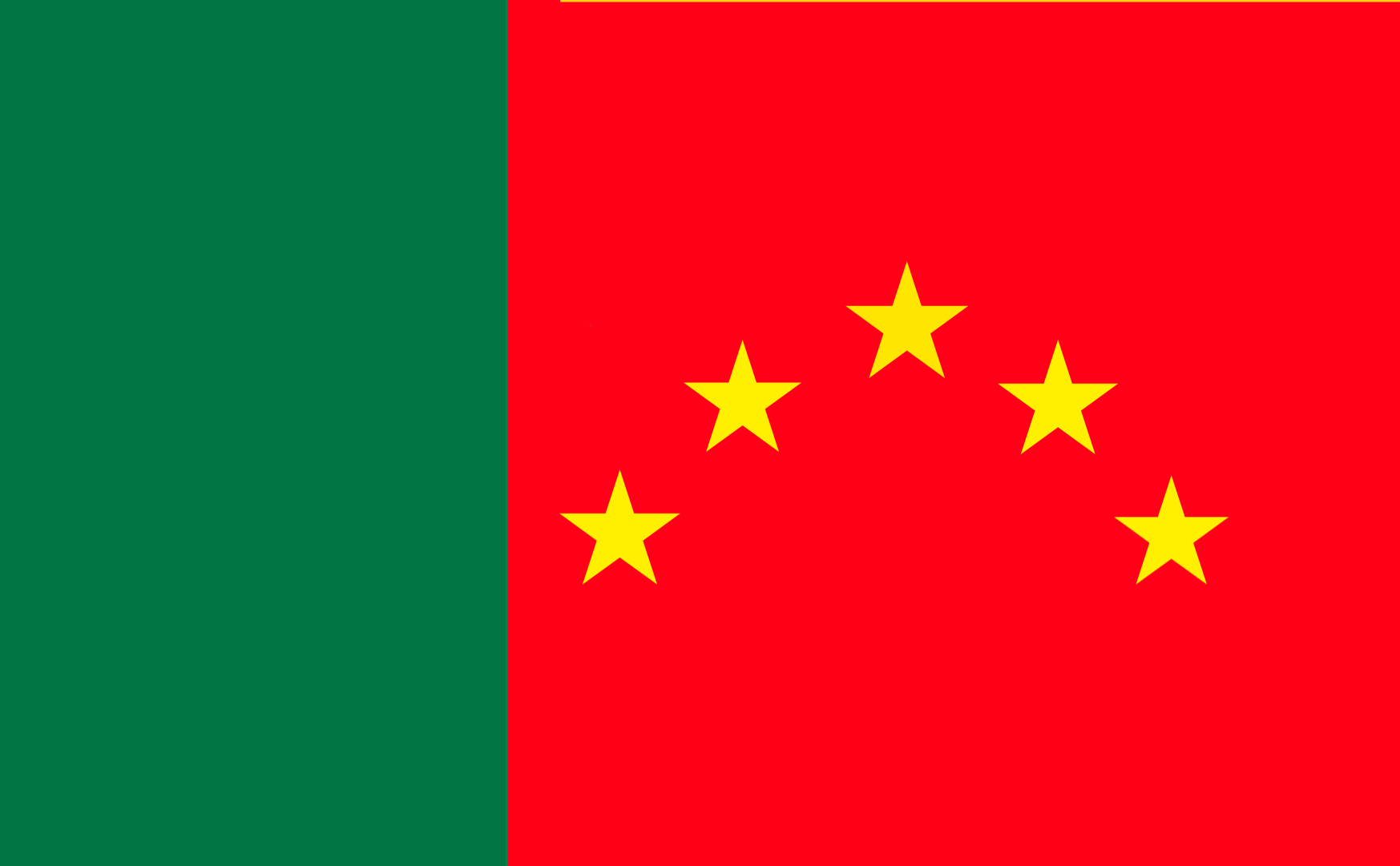

The Bangladesh National Awami Party (Bhashani) (Bengali: বাংলাদেশ ন্যাশনাল আওয়ামী পার্টি (ভাসানী)) is a political party in Bangladesh. The party traces its origins to a splinter group of the original National Awami Party (Bhashani) led by Mashiur Rahman, better known as Jadu Mia. Mia's NAP faction had merged with the Bangladesh Nationalist Party (BNP) in the late 1970s. Mia's son Shafiqul Ghani Swapan founded the modern party in December 2006 splitting from the BNP.

== Organization ==
As of 2020, Jebel Rahman Ghaani served as party chairman and M. Golam Mostafa Bhuiyan as party general secretary. The party was registered with the Bangladesh Election Commission as 'Bangladesh National Awami Party-Bangladesh NAP' (Bengali: বাংলাদেশ ন্যাশনাল আওয়ামী পার্টি-বাংলাদেশ ন্যাপ) on November 13, 2008. The election symbol of the party is a cow. As of 2019 the party claimed to have organized committees in 38 districts. The party is led by a 71-member Central Committee.

== Electoral politics and alliances ==
In 2012, the party joined the BNP-led 20 Party Alliance. The party boycotted the 2014 general election. However, the party broke away from the alliance on 16 October 2018. Along with the National Democratic Party, the Bangladesh NAP protested against the alliance of BNP with the Jatiya Oikya Front. Subsequently, Bangladesh NAP and NDP joined the Bikalpa Dhara Bangladesh-led United Front.
