= Dilip Barua =

Bangladeshi politician

- দিলীপ বড়ুয়া
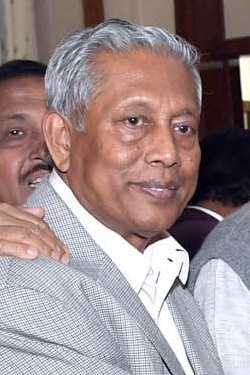
- Barua in 2019

Minister of Industries
- In office 6 January 2009 – 21 November 2013
- Prime Minister: Sheikh Hasina
- Preceded by: Tapan Chowdhury (as Adviser)
- Succeeded by: Amir Hossain Amu

General Secretary of Communist Party of Bangladesh (Marxist-Leninist) (Barua)
- Incumbent
- Assumed office 1984

Personal details
- Born: 28 February 1949 (age 77)
- Party: Communist Party of Bangladesh (Marxist-Leninist) (Barua)
- Education: University of Dhaka
- Occupation: politician

Dilip Barua (born 28 February 1949) is a Bangladeshi politician. He is the general secretary of the Bangladesher Samyabadi Dal (Marksbadi-Leninbadi) ('Communist Party of Bangladesh (Marxist–Leninist)'). In January 2009, Barua was named Minister of Industries in the cabinet of Sheikh Hasina.

== Early life and education ==
Barua was born on 28 February 1949. He completed his BSc (honours) in physics, MSc from the Dhaka University. He obtained MA, Diploma in journalism and LLB from the same university.

== Career ==
Barua was a leader of the East Pakistan Students Union from 1966 to 1970. He was a member of the Communist Party since 1969 and elected member of the Dhaka City Committee of the Party in 1972. He was the President of the Jubo Federation during 1977–1979.

Barua is one of the architects of the 14-party alliance. He played a vital role in the formulation of the 31-point reforms of the caretaker government and the 23-points programs.

During his long political career, he was imprisoned in 1969 as the student leader, in 1983 as a member of the Political Bureau. He led an underground life several times due to political reasons.
