= 20 Party Alliance =

Political Coalition in Bangladesh

20 Party Alliance ২০ দলীয় ঐক্যজোট
- Leader: Khaleda Zia
- Founded: 1999 (as Four Party Alliance)
- Dissolved: 9 December 2022
- Preceded by: 7 Party Alliance
- Succeeded by: 12 Party Alliance; Nationalist Likely Minded Alliance
- Headquarters: Dhaka, Bangladesh
- Ideology: Majority: Political opportunism Big Tent; Conservatism (Bangladeshi); Economic liberalism Factions: Bangladeshi nationalism Islamism
- Political position: Centre-right to Far-right

The 20 Party Alliance was a Bangladeshi big tent political coalition led by the Bangladesh Nationalist Party (BNP). It was originally formed as the 18 Party Alliance on 18 April 2012 in Dhaka, extending its predecessor the 4 Party Alliance. The Alliance was formed in an effort to strengthen the opposition's demands for restoring the caretaker government system used between 1996 and 2008. The main rival of this coalition was the Grand Alliance, led by Awami League, which came into power after the election in 2008. The 20 Party Alliance was dissolved on 9 December 2022.

== History ==
The Four Party Alliance was formed in 1999 ahead of the 2001 General Election, and consisted of the Bangladesh Nationalist Party (BNP), Jamaat-e-Islami, Jatiya Party (Naziur) and Islami Oikya Jote. The alliance won a substantial majority in 2001, but was heavily defeated by the Awami League-led Grand Alliance in 2008. On 18 April 2012, the Four Party Alliance was extended and took the new name "18 Party Alliance". The 20 Party alliance was ultimately dissolved on 9 December 2022 in order to form two new platforms named 12 Party Alliance led by BNP and the "Jatiyatabadi Samamona Jote" (Nationalist Like-minded Alliance).

== Members ==
Synthesized from Bangladeshi media tracking 20 parties and factions that frequently splintered due to political opportunism and short-lived alliances. Sources:

1. Bangladesh Nationalist Party
2. Bangladesh Jamaat-e-Islami (Note: Registration cancelled in 2013. Participated in the 2018 general election with BNP's symbol.)
3. Liberal Democratic Party
4. Jatiya Party (Kazi Zafar faction)
5. Bangladesh Jatiya Dal (Syed Ehsanul Huda faction)
6. Bangladesh Jatiya Party (Andaleeve Rahman faction) (until 2019)
7. Islami Oikya Jote (until 2017) (Maulana Abdur Rakib faction stayed)
8. Khelafat Majlish (until 2021)
9. Jatiya Ganatantrik Party (Note: Registration cancelled in 2021.) (Tasmia Pradhan faction)
10. Bangladesh Kalyan Party
11. National People's Party (until 2014) (AZM Fariduzzaman Farhad faction stayed)
12. National Democratic Party (until 2018) (K. M. Abu Taher faction stayed)
13. Bangladesh Labour Party
14. Bangladesh Muslim League
15. Jamiat Ulema-e-Islam Bangladesh (Zia Uddin/Mansurul Hasan faction left in 2021; Mohiuddin Ikram faction stayed)
16. Bangladesh Islamic Party (until 2014) (Abul Kasem faction stayed)
17. Bangladesher Samyabadi Dal (Nurul Islam faction)
18. Bangladesh National Awami Party (Bhashani) (Jebel Rahman Gani faction left in 2018; Azharul Islam faction stayed)
19. Democratic League (Saifuddin Moni faction)
20. People's League (Garib Newaz faction)

== Electoral results ==
=== Jatiya Sangsad ===
Election	Seats won	Change	Share of votes	Swing	Status
2001	214 / 300	New	xxx.xxx%	New	Government
2008	33 / 300	▼181	xxx.xxx%	▼ xx.xx%	Opposition
2014	0 / 300	▼33	Boycott		Extra-parliamentary
2018	8 / 300	▲8	xxx.xxx%	xx.xx%	Opposition

== See also ==
- Politics of Bangladesh
- List of political parties in Bangladesh
- Grand Alliance
- Jatiya Oikya Front
- Like-minded 8 Parties
- Hartal in Bangladesh
