= Liberal Democratic Party (Bangladesh) =

Political party in Bangladesh

Liberal Democratic Party লিবারেল ডেমোক্রেটিক পার্টি
- Abbreviation: LDP
- President: Oli Ahmad
- Secretary-General: Vacant
- Executive President: Jahanara Begum
- Founded: 26 October 2006 (19 years ago)
- Headquarters: 29/B, East Panthapath, Tejgaon, Dhaka-1208
- Ideology: Economic liberalism (Bangladeshi)
- Political position: Centre
- National affiliation: 11 Party Alliance Former: Grand Alliance; (2008–2012); 20 Party Alliance; (2012–2022)
- International affiliation: None
- Colours: Blue
- Bangladesh Parliament: 0 / 350

Election symbol
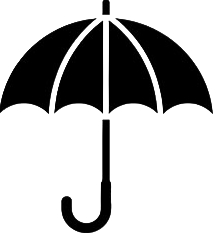
- Umbrella

Party flag

Website
- ldp-bangladesh.com

The Liberal Democratic Party (Bengali: লিবারেল ডেমোক্রেটিক পার্টি) is a political party in Bangladesh. The party was formed after abolishing Bikolpo Dhara on 26 October 2006 by former President of Bangladesh A. Q. M. Badruddoza Chowdhury, Oli Ahmed, and 24 other former members of parliament and ministers from the Bangladesh Nationalist Party (BNP).

Soon after its formation B. Chowdhury left LDP with his followers back to Bikalpa Dhara again. Thereafter, Oli Ahmad was elected as president and former speaker Sheikh Razzak Ali as executive president of the party. From its inception LDP was an ally of the Grand Alliance.

However, before the 2008 election, LDP came out of the grand alliance and contested the elections on their own. President of LDP Oli Ahmed won for the sixth time from Chittagong-13. In 2012, LDP joined the 18 Party Alliance led by Bangladesh Nationalist Party.

For the 2018 election, the LDP was then part of the Jukto Front Alliance, along with the Krishak Sramik Janata League and the Islamic Party of Bangladesh. The party joined like-minded 11 parties alliance for the 2026 Bangladeshi general election. LDP received 2,59,469 votes securing 0.35% vote share.

== Election results ==
=== Presidential elections ===
Election	Party candidate	Votes	%	Result
2026	Oli Ahmed	88	26.5%	Lost ✗

=== Jatiya Sangsad elections ===
Election	Party leader	Votes	%	Seats	+/–	Position	Government
2008	Oli Ahmad	191,679	0.27%	1 / 300	New	▲8th	Coalition
2014	Oli Ahmad	Boycotted		0 / 300	▼1	—N/a	Extra-parliamentary
2018	Oli Ahmad	25,152	0.03%	0 / 300	0	▼17th	Extra-parliamentary
2024	Oli Ahmad	Boycotted		0 / 300	0	—N/a	Extra-parliamentary
2026	Oli Ahmad	259,469	0.35%	0 / 300	0	▲7th	Opposition
