= Gano Forum =

Bangladeshi political party

Gano Forum গণফোরাম People's Forum
- President: Subrata Chowdhury (Acting)
- General Secretary: Md. Mizanur Rahman
- Founder: Kamal Hossain (President Emeritus)
- Founded: 1992
- Split from: AL
- Headquarters: Eden Complex, Arambagh, Dhaka
- Ideology: Bengali nationalism Secularism (Bangladeshi)
- Colours: Green
- Seats in the Jatiya Sangsad: 0 / 350

Election symbol

Party flag

Website
- gonoforum.org

Gano Forum (Bengali: গণফোরাম; lit. 'People's Forum' GF) is a political party in Bangladesh. GF was formed through a split of the Awami League and the merger of civil society groups in 1992. The constitutional lawyer and international jurist Kamal Hossain serves as President Emeritus.

The former Bangladeshi finance minister Abul Maal Abdul Muhith served as the founding general secretary of party. After the death of Saifuddin Ahmed Manik in 2008, Then Mostafa Mohsin Montu served almost one decade and then Reza Kibria has served as the General Secretary until he resign from the party in February 2021.

Veteran politicians such as Advocate Zahirul Islam (former MP) and Mafizul Islam Khan Kamal (former MP) are a part of Gano Forum. Mafizul Islam Khan Kamal is the executive president of the party. Amsaa Amin, Abu Sayeed, A. H. M. Khalequzzaman, Shubrata Chowdhury, Mostafa Mohsin Montu, Sultan Md. Monsur Ahmed, Reza Kibria were the candidates of Gano Forum from Jatiya Oikya Front in the 2018 Bangladeshi general election. Currently, Subrata Chowdhury is serving as the acting president and Md. Mizanur Rahman is serving as the general secretary.

== Election results ==
=== Jatiya Sangsad elections ===
Election	Party leader	Votes	%	Seats	+/–	Position	Government
Feb 1996	Kamal Hossain	Boycotted		0 / 300	New	—N/a	Extra-parliamentary
Jun 1996	Kamal Hossain	54,250	0.13%	0 / 300	0	▲9th	Extra-parliamentary
2001	Kamal Hossain	8,494	0.02%	0 / 300	0	▼16th	Extra-parliamentary
2008	Kamal Hossain	72,911	0.10%	0 / 300	0	16th	Extra-parliamentary
2014	Kamal Hossain	Boycotted		0 / 300	0	—N/a	Extra-parliamentary
2018	Kamal Hossain	501,737	0.59%	2 / 300	▲2	▲10th	Opposition
2024	Mafizul Islam Khan Kamal	9,964	0.02%	0 / 300	▼2	▼23rd	Extra-parliamentary
2026	Subrata Chowdhury	5,066	0.01%	0 / 300	0	N/A	Extra-parliamentary
