= Jatiya Oikya Front =

Bangladeshi nationalist political alliance

Jatiya Oikya Front জাতীয় ঐক্য ফ্রন্ট
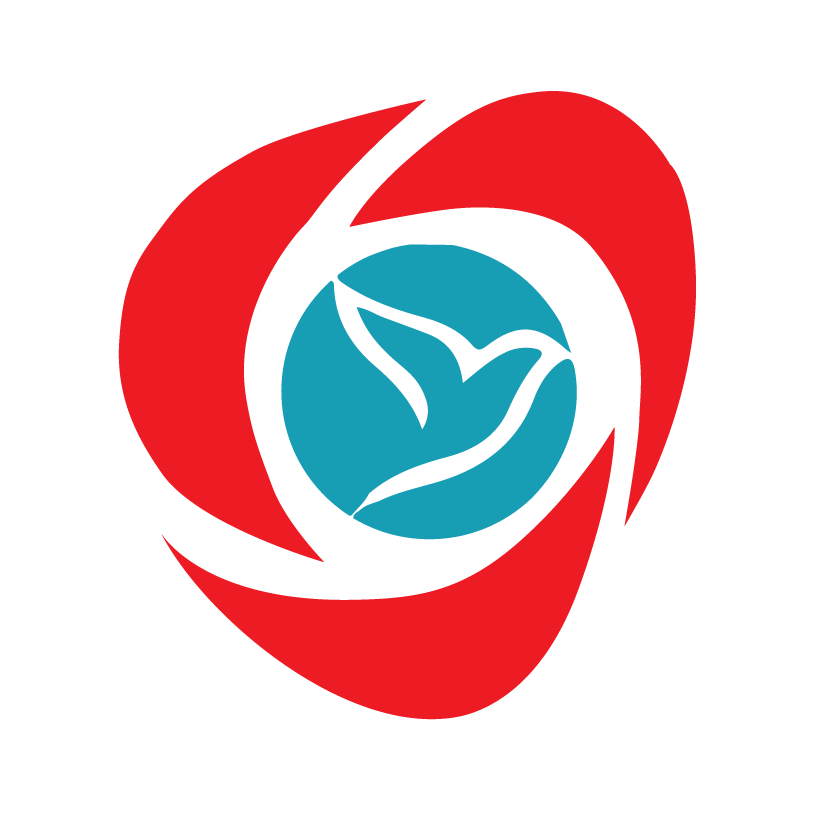
- Leader: Kamal Hossain (GF)
- Secretary-General: Mirza Fakhrul Islam Alamgir (BNP)
- Founded: 13 October 2018
- Dissolved: 12 December 2022
- Headquarters: Dhaka, Bangladesh
- Political position: Centre
- National affiliation: 20 Party Alliance
- Members: Bangladesh Nationalist Party; Gano Forum; Nagorik Oikko; Jatiya Samajtantrik Dal (Rab); Krishak Sramik Janata League

Election symbol
- Sheaf of Paddy

Jatiya Oikya Front (English: National Unity Front; Bengali: জাতীয় ঐক্য ফ্রন্ট) was a Bangladesh-based political alliance of primarily four parties led by Kamal Hossain. The front officially declared its formation on October 13, 2018, at the National Press Club ahead of the national election.

The front originally comprised Gano Forum, Bangladesh Nationalist Party, Jatiya Samajtantrik Dal-JSD and Nagorik Oikko. Later, on 5 November 2018, Krishak Sramik Janata League, led by Abdul Kader Siddique joined the front.

The front declared seven demands and eleven goals for a free, fair and credible election and to ensure the balance of power in the government structure.

== Background ==
With the Grand Alliance Victory in 2008, an Awami League-led government took charge in January 2009, and abolished the caretaker government system that used to oversee the national elections since 1991.

=== Abolishment of caretaker government ===
Though the election, through which Awami League and their allies got elected, was conducted by an election-time technocrat caretaker government, the government abolished the system in 2011 following a court verdict that declared the thirteenth amendment of the constitution illegal.

The abolishment of an agreed system to oversee the national election enraged the opposition groups who boycotted the general election in 2014 and took streets demanding the restoration of the caretaker government system to oversee the election. When the government started suppressing the opposition movement, they retaliated violently that caused death to no less than 300 people across the country.

=== 2014 national election ===
In the election of 2014, only 12 of the 42 registered parties took part and 154 constituencies were left disenfranchised. The opposition leader of the parliament, Begum Khaleda Zia was placed under house arrest before the election that continued for another week.

In March 2014, after months of turbulence, Begum Khaleda Zia called off the strike and urged to forge a national unity.

Later, in 2015, Bangladesh Nationalist Party again enforced a country-wide blockade when their chairperson was not allowed to take part in a procession and put under house arrest in her office building. They demanded the restoration of neutral caretaker government system again, but to no avail.

=== Jatiya Oikya Prokriya floated ===
In August 2016, against the backdrop of a political uncertainty, Kamal Hossain floated the platform "Jatiya Oikya Prokriya" that loosely translates into National Unity Process in English.

The platform aimed at working to expedite a national unity among the battling political groups by reducing their differences by holding talks and seminars. Throughout 2016 to 2018, Oikya Prokriya held several seminars and invited leaders from prominent political parties aligned with the spirit of Bangladesh Liberation War.

On September 13, 2018, after months of talks Oikya Prokriya declared to work together with a newly formed political force led by former President Dr. AQM Badruddoza Chowdhury of Bikalpa Dhara Bangladesh.

On September 22 of the same year, Jatiya Oikya Prokriya held a public rally at Dhaka. Bangladesh Nationalist Party, Bikalpa Dhara Bangladesh, Nagorik Oikko, Jatiya Samajtantrik Dal (Rab), Gano Forum, Bangladesh Jatiya Party and some other parties shared the stage in the rally. They declared a four-point-demand in the rally. Also, a declaration to work from the same platform came from the podium that day.

== Formation ==
Jatiya Oikya Prokriya spearheaded by Gono Forum arranged several meetings with BNP, Bikalpadhara, JSD and Nagorik Oikya from the last week of September to the second week of October.

Finally on October 13, 2018, the top-tier leaders of all the parties except Bikapadhara sat together and chalked out their demands and goals in a long meeting, and declared the emergence of Jatiyo Oikya Front (National Unity Front), through a press conference held at National Press Club.

Bikalpadhara parted ways from the front as their demands were not fully met.

== Demands and goals ==
The front unanimously placed seven demands and eleven goals. The seven demands are placed to ensure a free, fair and credible election. While the eleven goals are the basic outline of how the front will run the government if elected. The front has a major focus on ensuring a balance of power among the ruling party and the opposition groups.

=== Demands ===
The seven-point-demand of the front includes:

1. To hold a free and fair election, the government must step down; parliament must be dissolved and an election-time neutral government must be formed following discussions. Khaleda Zia must be freed. The government must withdraw all cases against her and other BNP leaders and activists.
2. Reforms to the EC with the appointment of people acceptable to all parties through discussions. Electronic voting machines must not be used in the election.
3. Ensure freedom of speech for individuals, newspapers and electronic and social media, and all political parties' meetings and rallies.
4. Withdraw all cases against students involved in the protests for reforms to the quota system in government jobs and road safety measures, and against the journalists "charged for expressing their views". Scrap all 'black laws', including Digital Security Act.
5. Deploy the army with judicial powers to all polling stations from 10 days before the election to the formation of the government after the polls. Hand over the control of law enforcers to the Election Commission before the polls.
6. Local and international monitors must be allowed to observe the elections without any hindrance.
7. Halt proceedings of all political cases between the announcement of the schedule and the election results. Police must not file any new case against politicians.

=== Goals ===
The front has set eleven goals for themselves. They have promised to fulfil the goals if they are elected to power. These are:

1. In order to build the country in light with the spirit of liberation war and reduce one person's executive power, the balance of power will be ensured among President, Prime Minister and government, the administration will be decentralized and Ombudsman will be appointed;
2. Amendment of the Article 70 and formation of the constitutional commission to appoint non-partisan, neutral and honest persons in constitutional vital posts of the state;
3. To ensure independence and power of the judiciary;
4. To ensure necessary reformation of the Anti-Corruption Commission with a view to building a corruption-free, transparent administration and reduce corruption in government and private level;
5. Merit will be the only criterion in recruiting officials of the state to create pro-investment atmosphere and to reduce unemployment;
6. People's basic human rights, empowerment of woman, education for farmers, labours and poor and their medication will be ensured by the government;
7. All state institutions including civil administration, police and local government will be free from corruption;
8. Discipline in the banking sector, best of resources and proper distribution and welfare based economic growth will be ensured;
9. Making sure no militant group can use Bangladesh territory;
10. "Friendship with all, enmity with none" policy meant for other countries, and formation of a national unity to resolve political enmities;
11. To modernize and organize the armed forces.

=== Dissolution ===
The alliance was dissolved on 12 December 2022.
