= Krishak Sramik Janata League =

Bangladeshi political party

Krishak Sramik Janata League কৃষক শ্রমিক জনতা লীগ
- Abbreviation: KSJL
- President: Kader Siddiqui
- Secretary-General: Habibur Rahman Talukdar
- Founded: 24 December 1999; 26 years ago
- Split from: Bangladesh Awami League
- Headquarters: 80, Motijheel CBD (Bottom floor), Dhaka
- Student wing: Chhatra Andolan
- Youth wing: Jubo Andolan
- Ideology: Mujibism
- Colors: Jungle green
- Slogan: "নতুন চিন্তা, নতুন শক্তি, নতুন রাজনীতি" (Bengali) "New Thought, New Power, New Politics"
- House of the Nation: 0 / 350

Election symbol
- Woven towel

Party flag

The Krishak Sramik Janata League (Bengali: কৃষক শ্রমিক জনতা লীগ, lit. 'Peasants' Workers' People's League') is a political party in Bangladesh formed by Kader Siddiqui, a renowned war hero who led the Kaderia Bahini during the Bangladesh's Liberation War of 1971, after he left Awami League in 1999. Although, the party adopted the Mujibist ideology, which is the ideology of Awami League, the party of Sheikh Mujibur Rahman. The district of Tangail, which was headquarters of the Kaderia Bahini, is known as the "stronghold" of the party.

Most of the members of the party are Mujibists and ideologized by the Bangladesh Liberation War. The general secretary of the party is Habibur Rahman Talukdar, who got the Bir Protik award for his contributions in the liberation war. Kader Siddique is still the president of the party.

In the 2001 parliamentary election, the party won 1 out of 300 direct seats in the Sangsad. It joined the Jatiya Oikya Front on 5 November 2018 before the 2018 general elections. Although it left the alliance in 2019. Kader Siddique later stated that "joining the Jatiya Oikya Front led by Kamal Hossain was the greatest mistake of his life".

== Electoral history ==
=== Jatiya Sangsad elections ===
Election	Party leader	Votes	%	Seats	+/–	Position	Alliance	Government
2001	Abdul Kader Siddiqui	261,344	0.47%	1 / 300	▲1	8th	N/A	Opposition
2008	Abdul Kader Siddiqui	102,879	0.15%	0 / 300	▼1		N/A	Extra-parliamentary
2014	Abdul Kader Siddiqui	boycotted		0 / 300	Steady		N/A	Extra-parliamentary
2018	Abdul Kader Siddiqui	144,115	0.17%	0 / 300	Steady		JOF	Extra-parliamentary
2024	Abdul Kader Siddiqui	88,854	0.18%	0 / 300	Steady		N/A	Extra-parliamentary
2026	Abdul Kader Siddiqui	boycotted		0 / 300	Steady		N/A	Extra-parliamentary
