= Ganatantri Party =

Ganatantri Party গণতন্ত্রী পার্টি Democratic Party
- Leader: Arosh Ali
- General Secretary: Bhupendra Chandra Bhowmik
- Founded: 1990
- Ideology: Socialism (Bangladeshi)
- Political position: Left-wing
- National affiliation: Grand Alliance
- Jatiya Sangsad: 0 / 350

Election symbol
- Pigeon

Party flag
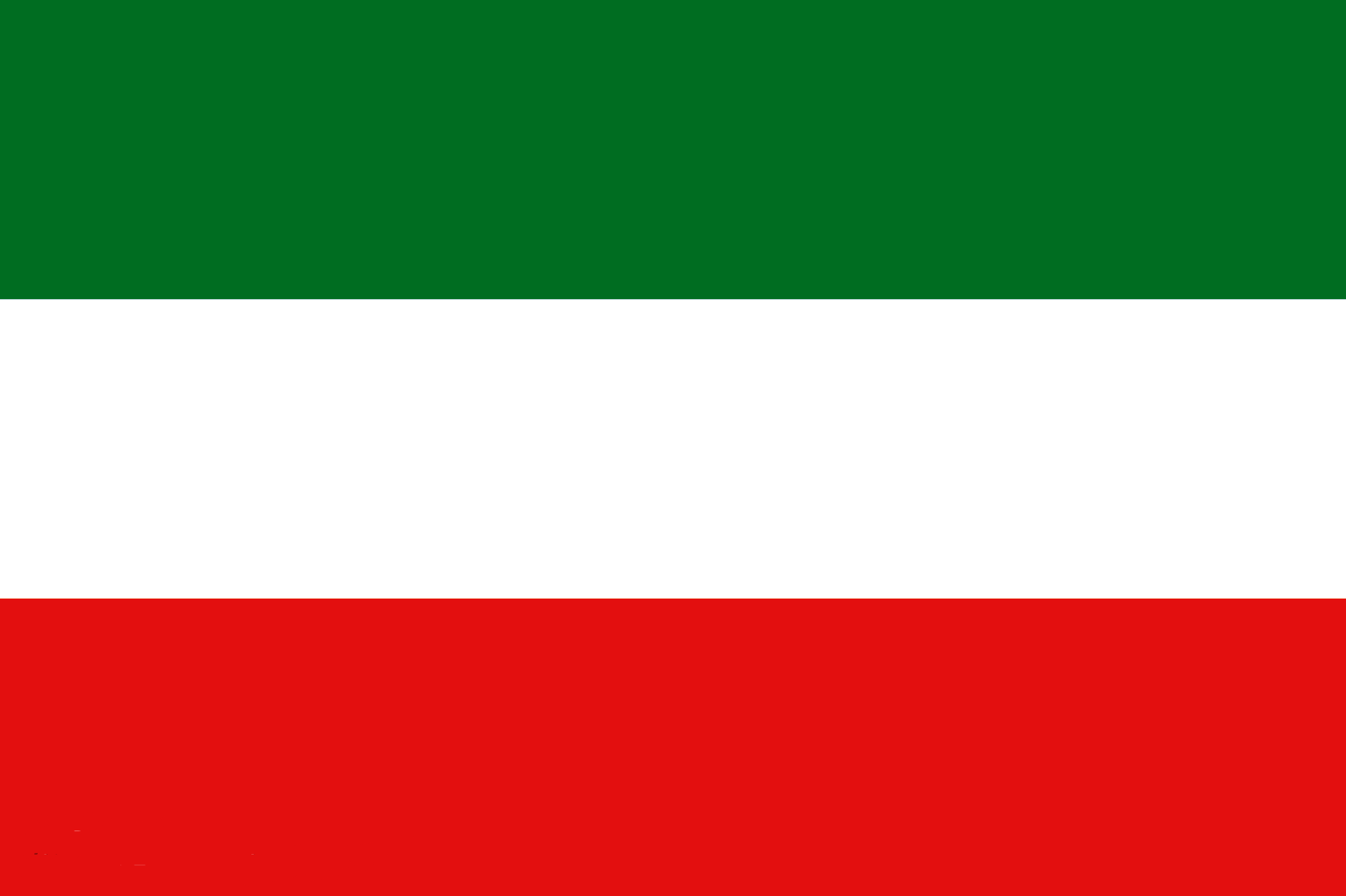

Website
- http://gonotontriparty.org/

The Ganatantri Party (Bengali: গণতন্ত্রী পার্টি, lit. 'Democratic Party') is a left-wing political party in Bangladesh. The party is closely aligned with the Awami League.

== History ==
Suranjit Sengupta was elected to Parliament from Sunamganj-2 on a Ganotantri Party nomination. He left the Ganotantri Party in 2001 and joined Bangladesh Awami League.

The Party's former President of the Party, Nurul Islam, died in a fire at his home in December 2009 before the 9th parliamentary election in which he was the candidate of the Grand Alliance in Noakhali-1. There were some allegations from his allies and family members that he was murdered.
