= Communist Party of Bangladesh (Marxist–Leninist) (Barua) =

Bangladeshi political party

Communist Party of Bangladesh (Marxist–Leninist) বাংলাদেশের সাম্যবাদী দল (মার্কসবাদী-লেনিনবাদী)
- Abbreviation: BSD-ML
- Leader: Dilip Barua
- Split from: Communist Party of Bangladesh (Marxist–Leninist)
- Headquarters: 27/11/1, Topkhana Road, Dhaka
- Ideology: Communism; Marxism–Leninism
- Political position: Far-left
- National affiliation: Grand Alliance
- Slogan: "দুনিয়ার মজদুর, এক হও!" (Workers of the world, unite!)

Party flag
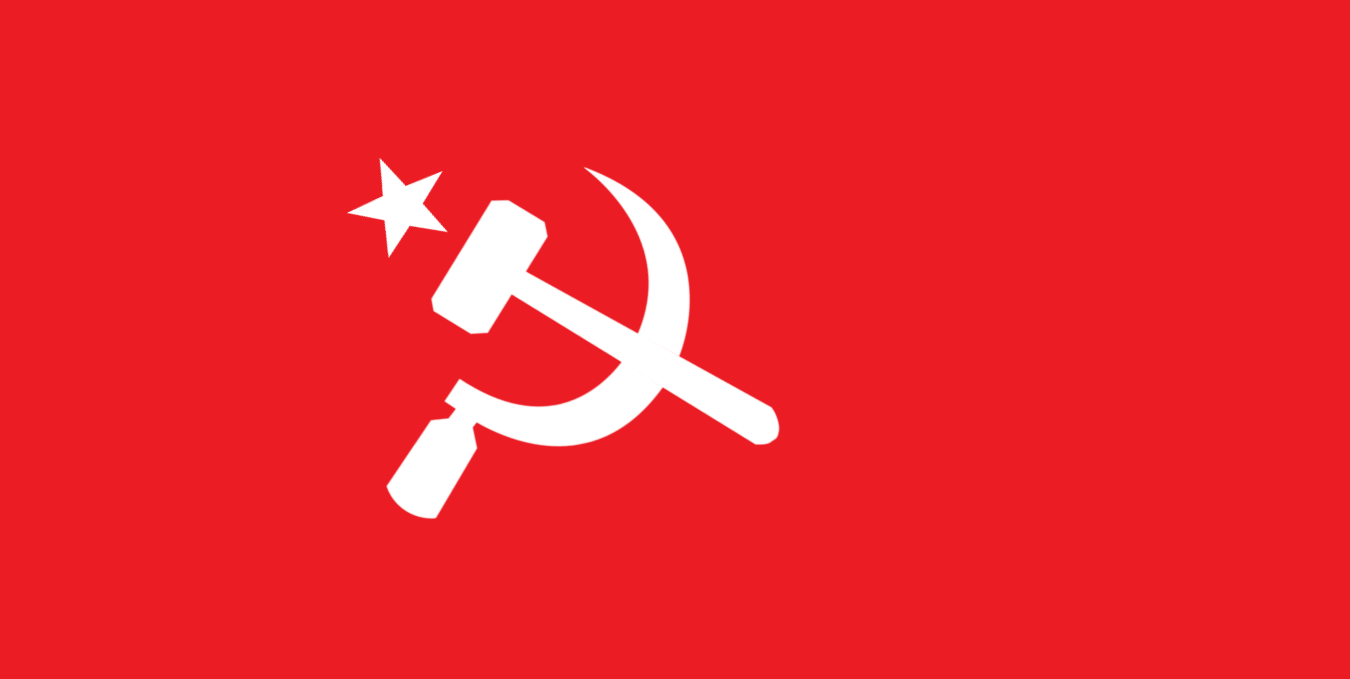

The Communist Party of Bangladesh (Marxist–Leninist) (Bengali: বাংলাদেশের সাম্যবাদী দল (মার্কসবাদী-লেনিনবাদী), abbreviated: BSD-ML) is a political party in Bangladesh. The party's general secretary is Dilip Barua. The BSD-ML was part of the Left Democratic Front and the 11-Party Alliance. The electoral symbol of the BSD-ML party is a wheel.

7th National Congress poster of the party in Dhaka.
