= 2023 Bangladesh parliamentary by-elections =

Bangladesh parliamentary by-elections in 2023
- 4 January 2023 (1 seat); 1 February 2023 (6 seats); 6 March 2023 (1 reserved seat) (Note: Initially scheduled for 20 March, but the only candidate was declared winner unopposed); 27 April 2023 (1 seat); 17 July 2023 (1 seat); 30 July 2023 (2 seats) (Note: Although the Chattogram-10 election was held as scheduled; in the Netrokona-4 election, initially scheduled for 2 September, the only candidate was declared winner unnopposed); 24 September 2023 (1 seat) (Note: Initially scheduled for 11 October, but the only candidate was declared winner unopposed); 5 November 2023 (2 seats); 9 November 2023 (1 seat) (Note: Initially scheduled for 26 November, but the only candidate was declared winner unopposed)

14 (Note: Unique figure; by-election was held twice in Brahmanbaria-2. Thus 15 by-election was held in 14 direct seats.) vacant seats out of 300 direct seats in the Jatiya Sangsad and; 1 vacant seat out of 50 reserved seats for women in the Jatiya Sangsad
- Registered: 4,735,329 (Note: Total number of voters of these constituencies (excludes seats won unopposed): Gaibandha-5: 339,004; Thakurgaon-3: 324,739; Bogura-4: 328,469; Bogura-6: 410,743; Chapai Nawabganj-2: 405,450; Chapai Nawabganj-3: 411,495; Brahmanbaria-2 (February): 370,123; Chattogram-8: 517,652; Dhaka-17: 325,205; Chattogram-10: 488,633; Lakshmipur-2: 403,744; Brahmanbaria-2 (November): 410,072)
- Turnout: 24.91% (Note: Constituency-wise break-up (excludes seats won unopposed): Gaibandha-5: 129,612 (38.23%); Thakurgaon-3: 150,334 (46.29%); Bogura-4: 78,570 (23.92%); Bogura-6: 91,742 (22.34%); Chapai Nawabganj-2: 141,040 (34.79%); Chapai Nawabganj-3: 119,658 (29.08%); Brahmanbaria-2 (February): 60,486 (16.34%); Chattogram-8: 75,305 (14.56%); Dhaka-17: 37,420 (11.51%); Chattogram-10: 57,153 (11.70%); Lakshmipur-3: 128,612 (31.85%); Brahmanbaria-2 (November): 109,665 (26.74%))
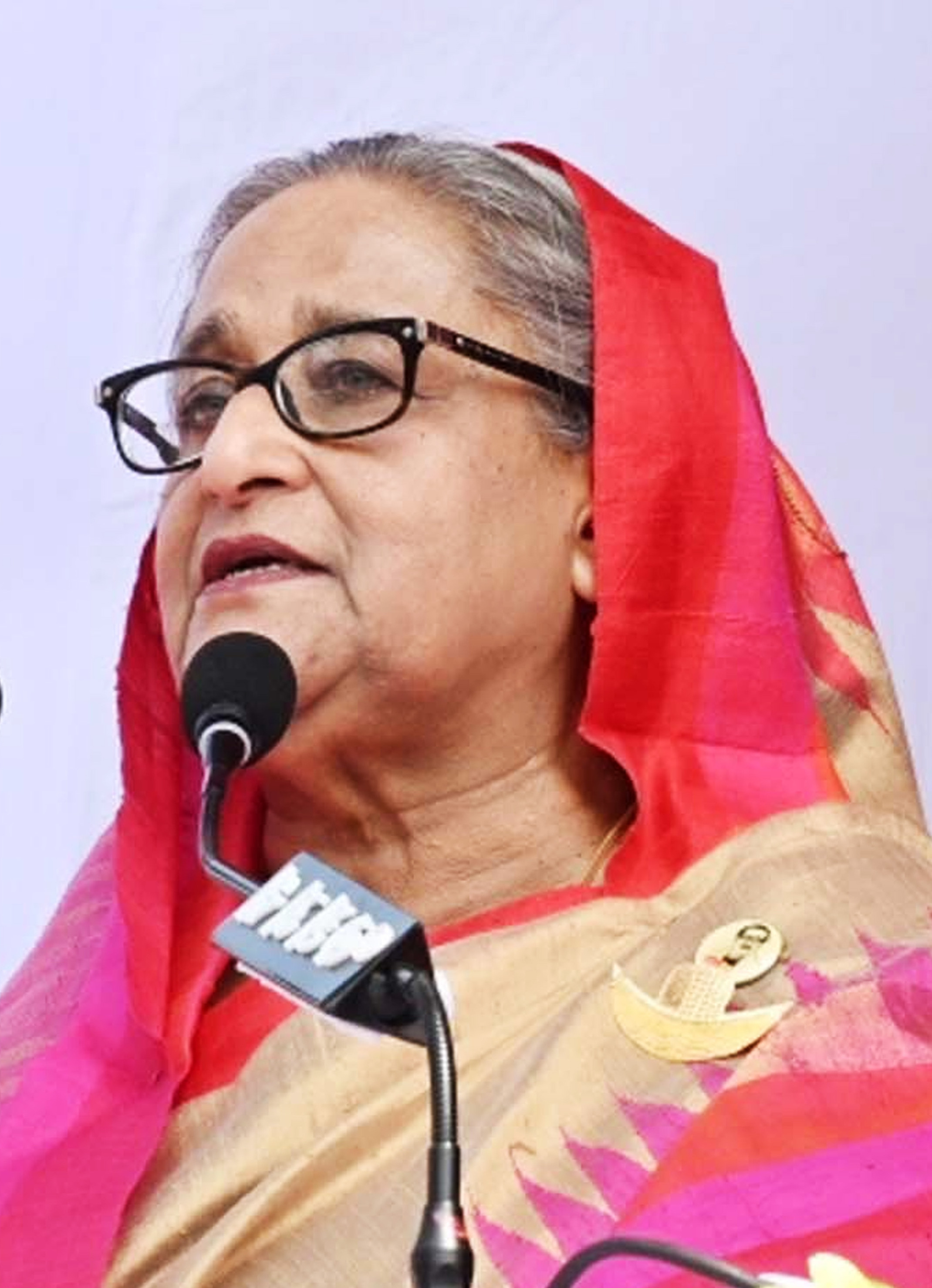

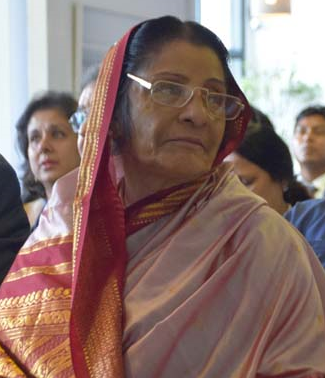

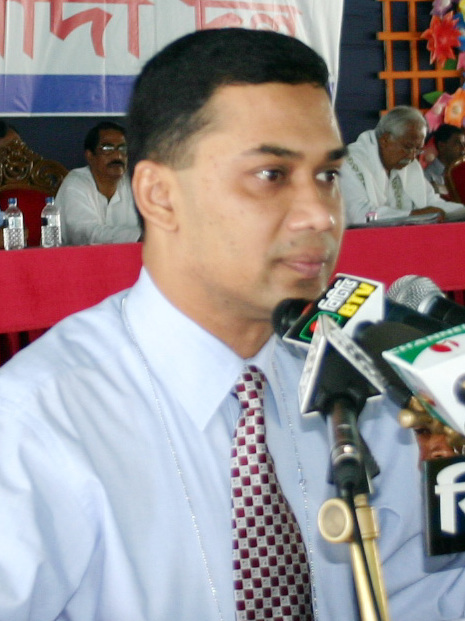

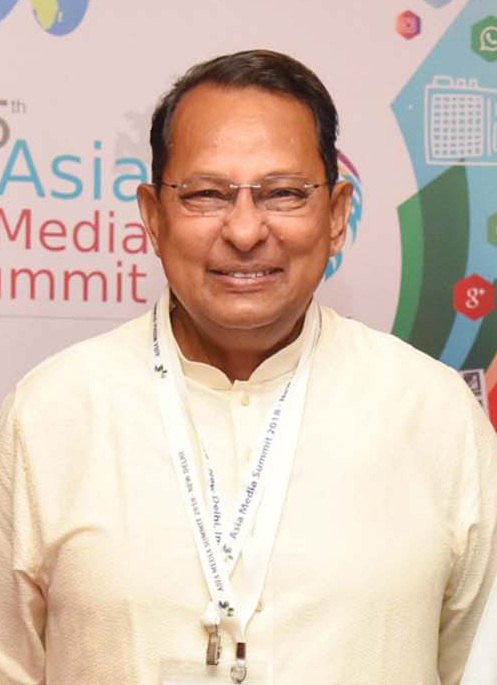
	First party	Second party	Third party
Leader	Sheikh Hasina	Raushan Ershad	Tarique Rahman
Party	AL	JP(E)	BNP
Seats before	5 (Note: Seats in the vacant seats before vacancy and election)	0	7
Seats won	8	1	Boycotted
Seat change	▲3	▲1	▼7
Popular vote	618,035	169,347
	Fourth party
Leader	Hasanul Haq Inu
Party	JaSaD (Inu)
Seats before	0
Seats won	2
Seat change	▲2
Popular vote	21,745
Leader of the House before election
Sheikh Hasina
AL
Leader of the House
Sheikh Hasina
AL

In 2023, by-elections are scheduled to be held for vacant seats in the Jatiya Sangsad, the legislative body of the People's Republic of Bangladesh. In the Jatiya Sangsad, MPs for 300 seats are elected directly and MPs for 50 reserved women seats are elected indirectly by the MPs, thus popular by-elections are only held in the direct seats. As the 11th parliament is scheduled to be expire on 29 January 2024 and the Election Commission has announced to hold the next Bangladeshi general election between late December 2023 to early January 2024, all candidates elected by these by-polls will be members of the 11th Jatiya Sangsad.

By-elections this year held much more significance than other by-elections during this (11th) parliament. Bangladesh has experienced democratic backsliding in recent years. Although all the by-elections are boycotted by Bangladesh Nationalist Party (BNP) and its allies. BNP and its allies, which are the 'political opposition' of the AL, has continuously accused the ruling Awami League of vote rigging and electoral dishonesty.

The first by-election was held after being postponed by the Election Commission after they witnessed 'mass irregularities', which other parties and observers had alleged before. However, the seat was later won by the ruling party.

Seven of the by-polls were held due to the resignation of BNP lawmakers from the parliament in December 2022 as part of their anti-governmental campaign. One of them was an MP for a reserved seat. The direct seats were all won by AL-backed candidates except one. BNP's Abdus Sattar Bhuiyan resigned from the party to re-run in the election and won. His election led to major political discussions and the popularization of the term 'candidate models'.

Except for these, by-elections were held in Chattogram-8, Dhaka-17 and Chattogram-10 with a very low voter turnout, with the AL candidate winning in the Netrokona-4 and Natore-4 unopposed. Incidents regarding the Dhaka-17 by-election resulted in some diplomatic and domestic actions and reactions. Eventually, political oppositions of the AL are predicted to continue boycotting elections under the current government led by Sheikh Hasina.

== Reasons and schedules for by-elections ==
=== Events leading to by-elections ===
As of 1 August 2023, there were 12 by-elections held in the country due to these following reasons:

Date	Constituency	Reason	Vacancy Date	Further information	Ref.(s)
4 January 2023	Gaibandha-5	Due to the midway postponement of a by-election in the same constituency on 12 October 2022 due to irregularities.	23 July 2022	The by-polls in October 2022 were being held because the seat felt vacant after the death of the MP Fazle Rabbi Miah (AL) on 23 July 2022.	
1 February 2023	Thakurgaon-3	Due to the resignation of the MP Zahidur Rahman (BNP).	11 December 2022	All of these lawmakers resigned as a part of their antigovernmental protests. The announcements were made on 10 December 2022 in a BNP rally. They submitted their letter the next day. The CN-3 MP had to re-submit his letter because the signature he put was scanned as he was abroad, thus delaying the vacancy process.	
1 February 2023	Bogura-4	Due to the resignation of the MP Mohamod Mosharof Hosen (BNP).	11 December 2022	All of these lawmakers resigned as a part of their antigovernmental protests. The announcements were made on 10 December 2022 in a BNP rally. They submitted their letter the next day. The CN-3 MP had to re-submit his letter because the signature he put was scanned as he was abroad, thus delaying the vacancy process.	
1 February 2023	Bogura-6	Due to the resignation of the MP Gulam Mohammad Siraj (BNP).	11 December 2022	All of these lawmakers resigned as a part of their antigovernmental protests. The announcements were made on 10 December 2022 in a BNP rally. They submitted their letter the next day. The CN-3 MP had to re-submit his letter because the signature he put was scanned as he was abroad, thus delaying the vacancy process.	
1 February 2023	Chapai Nawabganj-2	Due to the resignation of the MP Mohammad Aminul Islam (BNP).	11 December 2022	All of these lawmakers resigned as a part of their antigovernmental protests. The announcements were made on 10 December 2022 in a BNP rally. They submitted their letter the next day. The CN-3 MP had to re-submit his letter because the signature he put was scanned as he was abroad, thus delaying the vacancy process.	
1 February 2023	Brahmanbaria-2	Due to the resignation of the MP Ukil Abdus Sattar Bhuiyan (BNP).	11 December 2022	All of these lawmakers resigned as a part of their antigovernmental protests. The announcements were made on 10 December 2022 in a BNP rally. They submitted their letter the next day. The CN-3 MP had to re-submit his letter because the signature he put was scanned as he was abroad, thus delaying the vacancy process.	
1 February 2023	Chapai Nawabganj-3	Due to the resignation of the MP Harunur Rashid (BNP).	22 December 2022	All of these lawmakers resigned as a part of their antigovernmental protests. The announcements were made on 10 December 2022 in a BNP rally. They submitted their letter the next day. The CN-3 MP had to re-submit his letter because the signature he put was scanned as he was abroad, thus delaying the vacancy process.	
6 March 2023	Reserved Seat for Women-50	Due to the resignation of the MP Rumeen Farhana (BNP).	11 December 2022	All of these lawmakers resigned as a part of their antigovernmental protests. The announcements were made on 10 December 2022 in a BNP rally. They submitted their letter the next day. The CN-3 MP had to re-submit his letter because the signature he put was scanned as he was abroad, thus delaying the vacancy process.	
27 April 2023	Chattogram-8	Due to the death of the MP Moslem Uddin Ahmad (AL).	6 February 2023		
17 July 2023	Dhaka-17	Due to the death of the MP Akbar Hossain Pathan Farooque (AL)	15 May 2023		
30 July 2023	Chattogram-10	Due to the death of the MP Muhammad Afsarul Ameen (AL)	2 June 2023		
30 July 2023	Netrokona-4	Due to the death of the MP Rebecca Momin (AL)	11 July 2023		
5 November 2023	Lakshmipur-3	Due to the death of A. K. M. Shahjahan Kamal (AL)	30 September 2023		
5 November 2023	Brahmanbaria-2	Due to the death of Abdul Sattar Bhuiyan (Independent)	30 September 2023		

=== By-election schedules ===
==== January ====
By-election was held for 1 vacant seat in the parliament.

By-election event	Date
Election Date Announcement	23.08.2022
Last Date for Filling Nomination	13.09.2022
Scrutiny	15.09.2022
Withdrawal Last Date	22.09.2022
Electoral Symbol Allocation	23.09.2022
Voting & Results (postponed)	12.10.2022
Voting & Results (rescheduled)	04.01.2023

==== February ====
By-elections were held for 6 vacant seats in the parliament.

By-election event	Date
Election Date Announcement	18.12.2022 & 26.12.2022 (CN-3)
Last Date for Filling Nomination	05.01.2023
Scrutiny	08.01.2023
Withdrawal Last Date	15.01.2023
Electoral Symbol Allocation	16.01.2023
Voting & Results	01.02.2023

== Political parties and candidature ==
=== Party-wise candidate list ===
- Political parties:
- Independent(s): 20 independent candidates competed in 10 different seats.

Party	Seats Contested	Seats Won
Bangladesh Awami League	12	12
Jatiya Party-JaPa	10	1
Zaker Party	8	—
National People's Party-NPP	4	—
Jatiya Samajtantrik Dal-JaSaD	3	2
Bangladesh Nationalist Front-BNF	3	—
Trinomool Bangladesh National Party	2	—
Bangladesh Congress	2	—
Bangladesh Sanskritik Muktijot (Muktijot)	2	—
Bikalpa Dhara Bangladesh	1	—
Workers Party of Bangladesh	1	—
Bangladesh Khilafat Andolan	1	—
Bangladesh Islami Front	1	—
Islamic Front Bangladesh	1	—
Gano Front	1	—
Independent	10	1

== Election(s) ==
=== Gaibandha-5 ===
The Gaibandha-5 seat is the 33rd constituency of the parliament, which has been in control of JaPa and AL in different times. Miah won as a JaPa candidate on this seat in 1986 and 1991. Miah later joined AL and lost in 2001 to JaPa's Raushan Ershad, and then he won beating Raushan in 2008. He then served as the MP of this seat and as the Deputy Speaker of the parliament until his death on 22 July 2022, winning all elections in the interim as an AL candidate.

As the Election Commission announced the election schedule, only three political parties nominated candidates. Among four to five nomination seekers, AL nominated Mahmud Hasan as their party candidate, who was the former president of Chhatra League (AL's student-wing) from 2006 to 2011. On the other hand, JaPa nominated Golam Shahid Ranju, who was the vice-chairman of the party in Gaibandha during the election. Ranju also ran as a JaPa candidate in 2018, but he lost to Miah by a large margin. Apart from these two, Bikalpa Dhara's Jahangir Alam and six independent candidates submitted nomination papers, although four of the independent candidates' candidacy were cancelled after scrutiny.

== Results ==
=== Summary ===
Party	Symbol	Candidates	Votes		Seats		
Party	Symbol	Candidates		%	Direct	Reserved	Total
Bangladesh Awami League			564,912	49.98	12		12
Jatiya Party-JaPa (Ershad)			162,166	14.35	1		1
Jatiya Samajtantrik Dal (Inu)		3	21,745	1.92	1	1	2
Zaker Party			13,113	1.16			
Workers Party of Bangladesh		1	11,356	1.00			
Bangladesh Nationalist Front			6,925	0.61			
Bangladesh Islami Front		1	5,087	0.45			
Bangladesh Congress			3,610				
National People's Party (Shalu)			2,878				
Islamic Front Bangladesh		1	1,860				
Bikalpa Dhara Bangladesh		1	1,796				
Trinomool BNP		2	1,432				
Bangladesh Sankrtitic Muktijote		2	643				
Bangladesh Khilafat Andolan		1	468				
Gano Front		1	170				
Independent(s)			320,861		1		1

=== Constituency-wise ===
==== Gaibandha-5 ====
2023 Bangladesh parliamentary by-elections: Gaibandha-5 (Saghata-Fulchhari)
Party	Candidate	Votes	%	±%
AL	Mahmud Hasan Ripon	78,276	60.39%	—
JP(E)	A. H. M. Golam Shahid Ranju	44,950	34.68%	▲31.28pp
Independent	Syed Md. Mahbubur Rahman	2,950	2.27%	—
BDB	Md. Jahangir Alam	1,796	1.38%	—
Independent	Nahiduzzaman Nishad (Note: Boycotted after the by-election was rescheduled, but as the date of withdrawal was passed he was still an option for the voters to vote in the EVMs.)	1,640	1.26%	—
Margin of victory		33,326	25.71%	—
Turnout		129,612	38.23%	▼48.52pp
AL hold		Swing		

==== Thakurgaon-3 ====
2023 Bangladesh parliamentary by-elections: 5 Thakurgaon-3 (Pirganj-Ranisankail)
Party	Candidate	Votes	%	±%
JP(E)	Hafiz Uddin Ahmed	84,047	55.90%	—
Independent	Golap Chandra Roy	50,309	33.46%	—
WPB	Md. Yeasin Ali	11,356	7.56%	—
Zaker Party	Emdadul Haque	2,257	1.50%	—
BNF	Sirajul Islam	1,412	0.94%	—
NPP	Shafi Al Asad	953	0.64%	—
Margin of victory		33,738	22.44%	—
Turnout		150,334	46.29%	▼20.58
Registered electors		324,741		▲24,724
JP(E) gain from BNP		Swing		

==== Bogura-4 ====
2023 Bangladesh parliamentary by-elections: 39 Bogra-4 (Kahaloo-Nandigram)
Party	Candidate	Votes	%	±%
JSD	A. K. M. Rezaul Karim Tansen	20,437	TBD	—
Independent	Hero Alom	19,486	TBD	—
JP(E)	Shaheen Mustafa Kamal Faruque	TBD	TBD	—
Zaker Party	Abdur Rashid Sardar	TBD	TBD	—
BCP	Md. Tajuddin Mandal	TBD	TBD	—
Independent	Mushfiqur Rahman Kajal	TBD	TBD	—
Independent	Kamrul Hasan Siddique Juel	TBD	TBD	—
Independent	Elias Ali Mandal	TBD	TBD	—
Independent	Golam Mustafa	TBD	TBD	—
Margin of victory		951	—	—

==== Bogura-6 ====
2023 Bangladesh parliamentary by-elections: 41 Bogra-6 (Bogura Sadar)
Party	Candidate	Votes	%	±%
AL	Ragebul Ahsan Ripu	33,462	TBD	—
JP(E)	Nurul Islam Omar	TBD	TBD	—
JSD	Imdadul Haque Imdad	TBD	TBD	—
Gano Front	Afzal Hossain	TBD	TBD	—
BKA	Md. Nazrul Islam	TBD	TBD	—
Zaker Party	Md. Faysal Bin Shafiq	TBD	TBD	—
Independent	Sarkar Badal	TBD	TBD	—
Independent	Masudar Rahman Helal	TBD	TBD	—
Independent	Abdul Mannan Akondo	TBD	TBD	—
Independent	Hero Alom	4,540	TBD	—
Independent	Raqib Khan	TBD	TBD	—
Margin of victory		—	—	—

==== Chapai Nawabganj-2 ====
2023 Bangladesh parliamentary by-elections: 44 Chapai Nawabganj-2 (Bholahat-Gomostapur-Nachole)
Party	Candidate	Votes	%	±%
AL	Muh. Ziaur Rahman	TBD	TBD	—
JP(E)	Abdur Razzak	TBD	TBD	—
Zaker Party	Ghulam Mostafa	TBD	TBD	—
BNF	Nabiul Islam	TBD	TBD	—
Independent	Khursid Alam	TBD	TBD	—
Independent	Mohammad Ali Sarkar	TBD	TBD	—
Margin of victory		—	—	—

==== Chapai Nawabganj-3 ====
2023 Bangladesh parliamentary by-elections: 45 Chapai Nawabganj-3 (Nawabganj Sadar)
Party	Candidate	Votes	%	±%
AL	Md. Abdul Wadud Bishwas	TBD	TBD	—
BNF	Kamruzzaman Khan	TBD	TBD	—
Independent	Samiul Haque Liton	TBD	TBD	—
Margin of victory		—	—	—

==== Brahmanbaria-2 ====
2023 Bangladesh parliamentary by-elections: 244 Brahmanbaria-2 (Sarail-Ashuganj)
Party	Candidate	Votes	%	±%
Independent	Ukil Abdus Sattar Bhuiyan	46,323	—	—
JP(E)	Abdul Hamid Bhashani	9,580	—	—
Independent	Abu Asif Ahmed	3,238	—	—
Zaker Party	Zahirul Islam	1,427	—	—
Independent	Ziaul Haque Mridha	420	—	—
Margin of victory		36,543	—	—
Independent gain from BNP		Swing		
