= Abdul Malek (Thakurgaon politician) =

Bangladeshi politician

- আব্দুল মালেক

Member of Parliament for Thakurgaon-3
- In office 15 February 1996 – 12 June 1996
- Preceded by: Md. Mokhlesur Rahman
- Succeeded by: Emdadul Haque

Personal details
- Born: Thakurgaon District
- Party: Bangladesh Nationalist Party

Abdul Malek is a Bangladesh Nationalist Party politician. He was elected a member of parliament from Thakurgaon-3 in February 1996.

== Career ==
Abdul Malek was elected to parliament from Thakurgaon-3 as a Bangladesh Nationalist Party candidate in the 15 February 1996 Bangladeshi general election. He was defeated in the 5th Jatiya Sangsad elections on 1991 as a candidate of the National Awami Party and the 7th Jatiya Sangsad elections on 12 June 1996 as a candidate of the Bangladesh Nationalist Party from Thakurgaon-3 constituency.
