= Salahuddin Ahmed (Chapai Nawabganj politician) =

Bangladeshi politician

- সালাহ উদ্দিন আহমেদ

Member of Parliament for Chapai Nawabganj-2
- In office 3 March 1988 – 6 December 1990
- Preceded by: Mim Obaidullah
- Succeeded by: Syed Monjur Hossain

Personal details
- Born: Chapai Nawabganj
- Party: Jatiya Party

Salahuddin Ahmed is a politician from Chapai Nawabganj District of Bangladesh. He was elected a member of parliament from Chapai Nawabganj-2 in the 1988 Bangladeshi general election.

== Career ==
Salahuddin Ahmed was elected a member of parliament from the Chapai Nawabganj-2 constituency as an independent candidate in the 1988 Bangladeshi general election. He was defeated from Chapainawabganj-2 constituency as an independent candidate in the fifth parliamentary elections of 1991.
