= Khaled Hossain Mahbub =

Bangladeshi politician

- মোঃ খালেদ হোসেন মাহবুব

Member of the Bangladesh Parliament for Brahmanbaria-3
- Incumbent
- Assumed office 17 February 2026
- Preceded by: Obaidul Muktadir Chowdhury

Personal details
- Born: 11 September 1967 (age 58) Brahmanbaria Sadar Upazila, Brahmanbaria District
- Party: Bangladesh Nationalist Party
- Education: Bangladesh University of Engineering and Technology

Khaled Hossain Mahbub is a Bangladeshi politician. He is a member of parliament from Brahmanbaria-3. Chairman of the Parliamentary Standing Committee- Ministry of Commerce. He is also the economic affairs secretary of the Central Executive Committee-Bangladesh Nationalist Party (BNP) and also president of the Brahmanbaria District unit of the BNP.. He is also thr Chief Adviser of Brahmanbaria Ideal School.

== Early life ==
Mahbub was born on 11 September 1967 at Brahmanbaria Sadar Upazila under Brahmanbaria District.
