= Lutful Hai Sachchu =

Bangladeshi politician

Advocate Lutful Hai Sachchu

Member of 9th Jatiya Sangsad
- In office 25 January 2009 – 22 November 2010
- Preceded by: Haroon Al Rashid
- Succeeded by: Obaidul Muqtadir Chowdhury
- Constituency: Brahmanbaria-3

Member of East Pakistan Provincial Assembly
- In office 1970–1970
- Constituency: Comilla-3

Personal details
- Born: 1940 Mohammadpur-Sohata, Tipperah District, Bengal Presidency
- Died: 22 November 2010 (aged 69–70) Apollo Hospital Dhaka, Bangladesh
- Party: Awami League

Lutful Hai Sachchu (Bengali: লুৎফুল হাই সাচ্চু; 1940 – 22 November 2010) was a Bangladeshi politician and advocate. He was a former member of parliament for Brahmanbaria-3.

== Early life and education ==
Sachchu was born in 1940 to a Bengali family in the village of Mohammadpur-Sohata in Ramrail, Brahmanbaria subdivision, Tipperah District, Bengal Presidency (now Bangladesh). His father, Abdul Hai, was a first-class magistrate in eastern Bengal.

== Career ==
Sachchu was elected to the East Pakistan Provincial Assembly as an Awami League candidate for Comilla-3 at the 1970 elections but this assembly was not formed. Then the Bangladesh Liberation War broke out and he became an advisor to Mukti Bahini forces in sectors two and three.

In 1972, he was elected to be the general secretary of the Brahmanbaria Subdivisional Awami League. He served as the president of the Brahmanbaria District Awami League for the rest of his life. Sachchu was elected to Parliament in 2008 from Brahmanbaria-3 as an Awami League candidate. He was a Member of the parliamentary standing committee on commerce ministry.

== Death ==
Sachchu died on 22 November 2010 in his home in Gulshan Thana, Dhaka, from a cardiac arrest.
