= Rumeen Farhana =

Bangladeshi politician and lawyer

- রুমিন ফারহানা
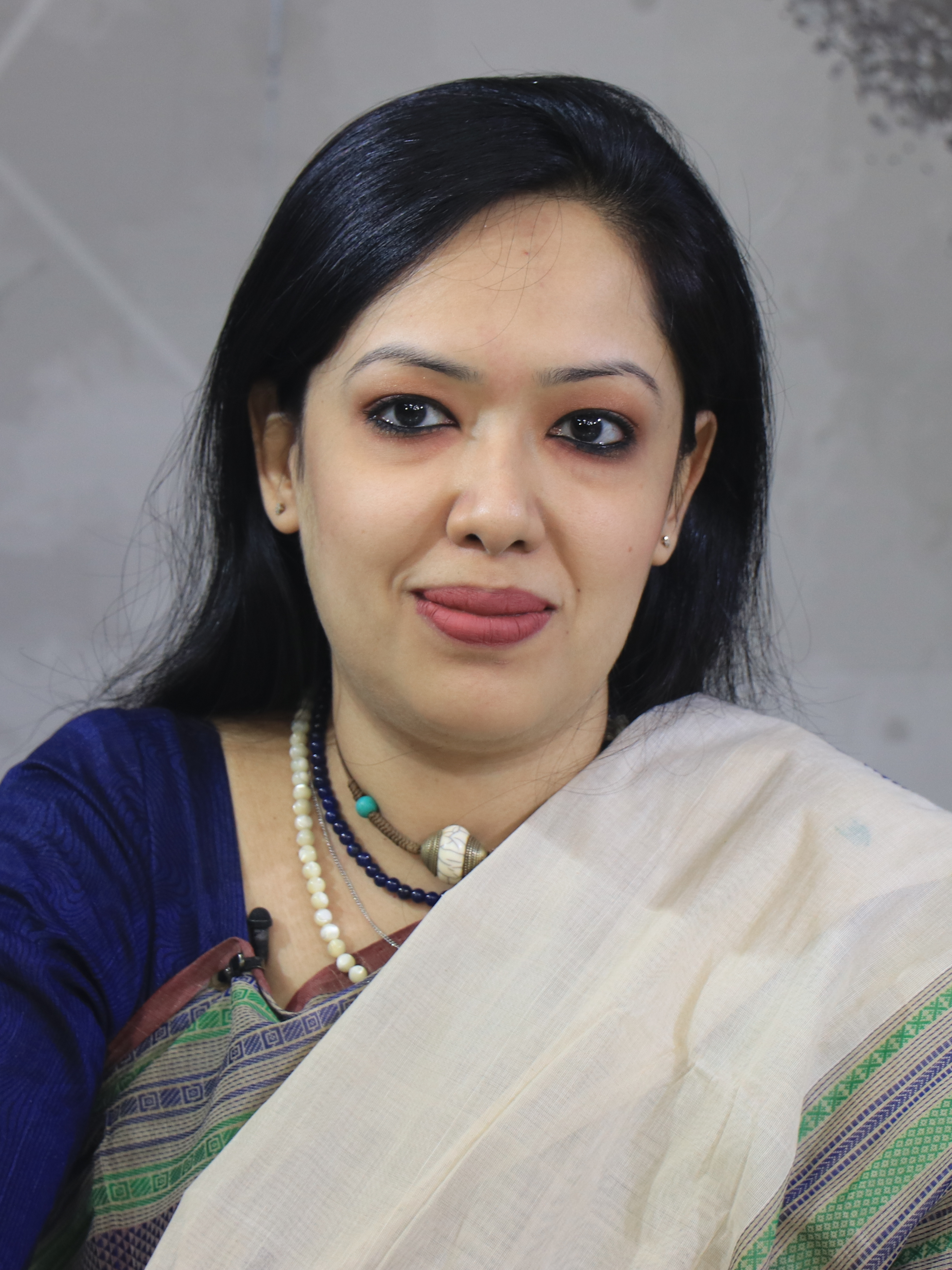
- Farhana in 2018

Member of Parliament
- Incumbent
- Assumed office 17 February 2026
- Preceded by: Moin Uddin
- Constituency: Brahmanbaria-2
- In office 28 May 2019 – 11 December 2022
- Preceded by: Khorshed Ara Haque
- Succeeded by: Afroza Haque Rina
- Constituency: Reserved Seat 50

Personal details
- Born: 19 August 1981 (age 45) Bijoynagar, Brahmanbaria, Bangladesh
- Party: Independent
- Other political affiliations: Bangladesh Nationalist Party (2012–2025)
- Parents: Oli Ahad (father); Rashida Begum (mother)
- Education: University of London
- Occupation: Politician, lawyer

Rumeen Farhana (born 19 August 1981) is a Bangladeshi politician, lawyer and member of parliament. She resigned from her position on 11 December 2022. She was again elected from Brahmanbaria-2 as an independent candidate in the 2026 Bangladeshi general election.

== Early life ==
Farhana was born in Islampur in Bijoynagar Upazila of Brahmanbaria District. Her father, Oli Ahad was a Bangladeshi politician. After completing secondary school from Holy Cross School and Higher Secondary from Viqarunnisa Noon School and College, she completed her graduation in law from University of London. Later she obtained Bar-at-Law from Lincoln's Inn of the United Kingdom.

== Career ==
Rumeen Farhana was the central international affairs secretary of the Bangladesh Nationalist Party (BNP). As a barrister, She worked in the legal profession of the High Court of Bangladesh. In the eleventh National parliamentary election, She represented the BNP as the only female member of parliament of BNP. Due to widespread irregularities in the 2018 Bangladeshi elections, Rumeen Farhana was one of only seven members of parliament from BNP, which was the main opposition party of Bangladesh until 2014, and one of two major political parties of Bangladesh from 1991 to 2014, until the persecution of opposition leaders and incarceration of the former prime minister Begum Khaleda Zia seriously debilitated the party.

Farhana is a member of the Dhaka Lawyers Association. She is also known as a Bangladeshi writer and journalist, law and politics.

In 2019, Farhana sought allotment of a 10 katha plot in Dhaka's Purbachal from the government. Any member of the parliament can apply for such an allotment, however her application was leaked from the ministry, which Rumeen speculated was deliberately done by the ministry because of her position as a member of the opposition party.

Farhana sought the nomination of the Bangladesh Nationalist Party (BNP) for the 2026 general election. However, the BNP-led alliance allocated the Brahmanbaria-2 constituency to Maulana Junaid Al Habib, the central vice president of Jamiat Ulema-e-Islam Bangladesh. In response, Farhana filed her nomination papers as an independent candidate on 29 December 2025. Following the filing, she told reporters that her decision mirrored that of her father, Oli Ahad, who had contested independently in 1973, drawing a parallel between his campaign and her decision to run independently against the BNP political wave. Consequently, the BNP expelled her from the party for violating organizational discipline by contesting the election against the alliance-backed candidate and additionally expelled multiple local leaders from her constituency for supporting her campaign. Campaigning under the "Duck" electoral symbol, Farhana won the election by defeating Junaid Al Habib by a margin of more than 38,000 votes, securing 118,547 ballots to Habib’s 80,434.

Farhana took her oath as a Member of Parliament on 17 February 2026, alongside other independent lawmakers and members of the opposition party. However, following the parliamentary swearing-in, she refused to take the additional oath required for membership in the Constitution Reform Council. While other independent MPs participated, Farhana walked out of the ceremony and abstained from the council.

On 21 February 2026, International Mother Language Day local BNP activists prevented her from placing floral tributes at the memorial and chanted slogans against her. During a physical scuffle her wreath was allegedly torn apart and she left the area escorted by supporters. Following the incident, the Dhaka–Sylhet highway in Shahbazpur was blocked due to a fire set by her supporters. A lawsuit was later filed against approximately 150 individuals in Brahmanbaria for barring her from paying tribute.

On 1 June 2026, Farhana, the lawmaker representing Brahmanbaria-2, announced that a human chain and protest program would be held in Shahbazpur Union to demonstrate against the suspension of a scheduled screening of the film Bonolota Express. The film, organized by the Brahmanbaria Film Society, a platform of undergraduate students, had been scheduled for exhibition on 30 May 2026 at the Annada Government High School premises as part of Eid-ul-Adha celebrations. The event was canceled following a social media campaign launched by local Qawmi madrasah students and Islamic student organizations opposing the screening, which had triggered conflicting claims between the student organizers and the school administration over venue approval. Farhana announced the protest timeline on her Facebook page, where she condemned the suspension of the screening and said she would personally attend the demonstration.

== Controversy ==
=== Purbachal plot allotment ===
In August 2019, Farhana became embroiled in controversy after her application to the Ministry of Housing and Public Works for a 10-katha or 7200 square feet plot in the Purbachal New Town Project was leaked to the public. In the application letter, she wrote, "I do not have any plot of land in Dhaka city. Therefore, I am requesting you to allot a 10-katha plot in Purbachal."

This statement was widely criticized as misleading, as it appeared to contradict her 2018 election affidavit, which confirmed her ownership of an 1,850 square-foot flat in Dhaka. The incident drew accusations of hypocrisy, with critics pointing out the perceived contradiction between her role as a vocal Awami League government critic and her application for a state-allocated asset.

In response, Farhana defended her right as a parliamentarian to apply for the plot, stating it was a standard privilege. She attributed the controversial wording to her personal assistant who, she claimed, had drafted the letter. She also argued that the primary ethical breach was the leaking of her official application from a government ministry. Following the public outcry, Farhana ultimately withdrew her application.

=== 2025 Election Commission altercation and social media post ===
In August 2025, Farhana became embroiled in a high-profile controversy involving a physical altercation at the Election Commission (EC) and a subsequent derogatory social media post.

On August 24, 2025, during a public hearing at the EC headquarters in Dhaka on the delimitation of the Brahmanbaria-2 and Brahmanbaria-3 constituencies, a scuffle broke out between supporters of Farhana and members of the National Citizen's Party (NCP). The altercation occurred in front of the Chief Election Commissioner and other officials. Farhana, who was present, later told reporters, "What didn't happen in 15 years, happened today—I was almost pushed down. The very BNP leaders and activists for whom I have fought for 15 years, they are the ones who pushed me." In contrast, NCP leaders accused Farhana's followers of initiating the violence, with NCP chief organizer Hasnat Abdullah alleging it was a "test match" by the BNP to demonstrate how they might capture polling centers.

The dispute escalated when Hasnat Abdullah, in media comments following the incident, referred to Rumeen as "BNP's Awami League affairs secretary," a political jibe implying she was secretly working for the opposition's main rival.

In response, Farhana took to her verified Facebook page and published a post targeting Abdullah. Sharing images of Abdullah with Awami League figures, she wrote, "Isn't this that fokinnir baccha (a vulgar Bengali pejorative translating to 'son of a beggar'), who called me the Awami League affairs secretary?"

Following a period of intense public disputes with Hasnat Abdullah, the political tensions subsided. Farhana extended an olive branch by sending Abdullah a gift of Brahmanbaria's famous Chhanamukhi sweetmeats, a gesture that Abdullah publicly acknowledged to resolve the friction.

== Bibliography ==
- Amader Rojanamacha
