= Hafiz Uddin Ahmed =

Bangladeshi politician

- হাফিজ উদ্দিন আহম্মেদ

Member of the Bangladesh Parliament for Thakurgaon-3
- In office 8 February 2023 – 6 August 2024
- Preceded by: Jahidur Rahman
- Succeeded by: Jahidur Rahman
- In office 28 October 2001 – 24 January 2014
- Preceded by: Emdadul Haque
- Succeeded by: Yeasin Ali
- In office 15 April 1988 – 6 December 1990
- Preceded by: Muhammad Shahidullah
- Succeeded by: Md. Mokhlesur Rahman

Personal details
- Born: 3 February 1946 (age 80)
- Party: Jatiya Party

Hafiz Uddin Ahmed (born 3 February 1946) is a Bangladesh Jatiya Party politician and a Jatiya Sangsad member representing the Thakurgaon-3 constituency for the 4th term.

== Early life ==
Ahmed was born on 3 February 1946. He studied until completing his HSC.

== Career ==
Ahmed was elected to parliament in 2001 as a candidate of the Jatiya Party from Thakurgaon-3. He was re-elected in the 2008 Bangladesh general election as a candidate of the Bangladesh Awami League-led Grand Alliance. He won the 2023 by-election as a Jatiya Party candidate.
