= Moin Uddin (politician) =

Bangladeshi politician

Md. Moin Uddin
- মোঃ মঈন উদ্দিন

Member of the Bangladesh Parliament for Brahmanbaria-2
- In office 30 January 2024 – 6 August 2024
- Preceded by: Md. Shahjahan Alam Shaju
- Succeeded by: Rumeen Farhana

Personal details
- Born: 31 December 1965 (age 60)
- Party: Independent
- Education: University of Dhaka

Mohammad Moin Uddin (born 31 December 1965) is a Bangladeshi politician. He is a former Jatiya Sangsad member representing the Brahmanbaria-2 constituency as an independent politician in 2024. He previously served as the joint general secretary of Brahmanbaria District Awami League and held the position of vice-president in the Awami Volunteers' League.
