= Oli Ahad =

Bangladeshi politician

- অলি আহাদ
- Born: c. 1928; Islampur, Bengal Presidency, British India
- Died: 20 October 2012 (aged 84–85); Dhaka, Bangladesh
- Citizenship: British Subject (1928–1947); Pakistani (1947–1971); Bangladeshi
- Education: University of Dhaka
- Occupation: Politician
- Political party: Bangladesh Awami League (1948–1957), National Awami Party (1957–1973); Independent (1973–1975), Bangla Jatiya League
- Spouse: Rashida Begum
- Children: Rumeen Farhana
- Awards: Independence Award

Oli Ahad (c. 1928 – 20 October 2012) was a Bangladeshi politician and language activist of the Language Movement. He was awarded the Independence Day Award in 2004 by the government of Bangladesh.

== Early life ==
Ahad was born in c. 1928 to a Bengali family in the village of Islampur in Bijoynagar, Brahmanbaria District (then part of Tipperah District, Bengal Presidency). His father, Abdul Wahab, was a district magistrate. In 1944, he passed matriculation from Daudkandi Government Aided High School. During the election for the referendum of Pakistan, he became involved in politics and campaigned in places like Tipperah and Bogra, and was arrested a number of times.

== Career ==
Ahad was one of the founders of the East Pakistan Muslim Chhatra League, formed on 4 January 1948. He was the founding general secretary of the Ganatantrik Juba League. He joined the National Awami Party (NAP) through the Kagmari Convention in 1957.

=== Involvement in language movement ===
Ahad first met with Khawaja Nazimuddin to discuss his language proposal on 8 January 1948. Later that year, he became a member of the committee that organised a hartal on 12 March, demanding Bangla be made the official state language. Prior to that, he was also nominated as a member of the Muslim Chhatra League. While picketing in front of the Secretariat, he was attacked and arrested along with Sheikh Mujibur Rahman, Khaleque Nawaz Khan, and Shamsul Haque.

In 1949, Ahad and three other students were expelled from the university. Ahad was present at the historical meeting that took place at the Amtala of Dhaka University on 21 February 1952. Later that day, he organized the agitated students. The next day, he led a rally and called for a nationwide Hartal.

== Other activities ==
Ahad served as the editor of the weekly publication Ittehad. He was also the chairman of a political party named Democratic League. He wrote a book named Jatiyo Rajneeti 1945 Theke 1975 (National Politics: 1945 to 1975).

== Illness and death ==
Ahad had been ill and in the hospital during March–April 2012, returning home after his condition improved. He was again admitted to Samarita Hospital in Dhaka on 14 October with a lung infection, ultimately resulting in his death on 20 October 2012.

== Family ==
Ahad was married to Rashida Begum, an academic who studied at the University of Chicago. They had a daughter, Barrister Rumeen Farhana, who serves as a Member of Parliament.

== Legacy ==
Dhaka City Corporation renamed Dhanmondi Road No. 4 after him on 27 February 2007.
