= Fazlul Haque Amini =

Bangladeshi politician

Mufti Fazlul Hoque Amini
- ফজলুল হক আমিনী

Member of Parliament for Brahmanbaria-2
- In office 10 October 2001 – 29 October 2006
- Preceded by: Ukil Abdul Sattar Bhuiyan
- Succeeded by: Ziaul Haque Mridha

Personal details
- Born: c. 1945 (Note: Sources differ regarding Amini's date of birth. Prothom Alo and The Bangladesh Chronicle say he died at age 70. According to risingbd.com he was born in 1943 and died at age 69. Amar Desh and The Daily Sangram say he died at age 67. The latter specifies his birth date as 15 November 1945.) Aminpur, Brahmanbaria, Bengal Presidency, British Raj
- Died: 12 December 2012 (aged 66–67) Dhaka, Bangladesh
- Resting place: Jamia Qurania Arabia Lalbagh, Dhaka, Bangladesh
- Party: Islami Oikya Jote
- Children: 2 sons and 4 daughters
- Relatives: Hafezzi Huzur (father-in-law)
- Education: Jamia Binoria, Karachi University, Punjab University

Fazlul Hoque Amini (Bengali: ফজলুল হক আমিনী) (c.1945 – 12 December 2012) was an Islamic scholar and politician from Bangladesh. He served as an MP in the Parliament of Bangladesh from 2002 to 2007. He was an expert in the fields of Islamic jurisprudence (fiqh), hadith and tasawwuf. He also held a number of positions on the boards of qaumi madrasahs. He was also the principal of Jamia Qurania Arabia Lalbagh in Lalbagh, Dhaka, one of the largest Deobandi madrasa of Bangladesh.

== Early life and education ==
Fazlul Haque was born on 15 November 1945 in the village of Aminpur in Brahmanbaria, Bengal Presidency. His father was Alhaj Wajed Uddin. He started his education in Jamia Islamia Yunusia at nine/ten years old before spending three years at Mustafaganj Madrasa in Munshiganj under Hafiz Muhsinuddin. His father then took him to Ashraful Uloom Bara Katara where he studied under Principal Pirji Huzur. Then in 1961, he enrolled at the Jamia Qurania Arabia Lalbagh for Hadith studies. In 1969, following the request of Shamsul Haque Faridpuri, Amini advanced his knowledge of ahadith and fiqh by going to Jamia Binoria in Karachi, West Pakistan for one year where he studied under Muhammad Yousuf Banuri.

== Career ==
Amini was the chairman of a faction of Islami Oikya Jote (IOJ), and also a leader of Tehreek-e-Khatme Nabuwwat. He was a former component of the BNP-led four-party alliance. In 1970, he became the Imam and Khatib of Alubazar Jame Masjid in Old Dhaka where he also founded a madrasa. In the same year, he became a teacher at Hafezzi Huzur's founded Madrasa Nuriya in Kamrangirchar, Dhaka and married Hafezzi's daughter. In 1972, he completed his hifz (memorisation of the entire Qur'an) in nine months. Under the leadership of Hafezzi Huzur, he was a member of the Antarjatik Shanti Mission (International Peace Mission) relating to the Iran–Iraq War. He became a teacher and assistant mufti at Jamia Qurania Arabia Lalbagh in 1975.

In 1984, he became the Chief Mufti of Lalbagh and later became its principal and Shaykhul Hadith in 1987 following Hafezzi Huzur's death. He also taught at Ashraful Uloom Bara Katara. In 1992, Amini organised a long march protest against the demolition of the Babri Masjid in Ayodhya, India. Amini was appointed as the guardian (Muhtamim and Mutawalli) of Ashraful Uloom Bara Katara in 2003.

In his home district of Brahmanbaria, he tackled certain non-governmental organisations (NGOs). In 1996, he stood up as a potential candidate for the Brahmanbaria-2 constituency, as a part of the Sammilita Sangram Parishad party, however he was unsuccessful. He managed to become MP during the 2001 Bangladeshi general election as a part of the Islami Oikya Jote party, receiving over 55% of total votes. He was able to create a strong mass movement when the Bangladesh High Court ruled in early 2001 to ban the fatwa. During the 2008 Bangladeshi general election, he stood up for the same constituency with IOJ party but was beaten by Md. Ziaul Haque Mridha of the Jatiya Party.

== Views ==
He spoke out against the Women Development Policy of 2011 and the Education Policy of 2012 formulated by the Awami League government after coming to power in January 2009, saying the proposed legal reforms were anti-Islamic. According to Rashidul Hasan, writing in The Daily Star in April 2011:

Amini, in his booklet, termed anti-Islamic the policy's section-23.5 that talks about women's equal opportunity and participation in employment, wealth, market and business. So is section 25.2, which seeks to give women full control over the wealth they accumulate through earning, inheritance, loans and market management, according to Amini.

Islamic scholars and academics interviewed by The Daily Star disagreed with Amini, saying there was nothing anti-Islamic about the policies. They said Amini was misinterpreting the Quran out of ignorance, or was deliberately twisting its words for political gain.

At a gathering on 14 July 2011, Amini, speaking about the 15th Amendment to the Constitution, which among other things restored the principle of secularism and freedom of religion, said, "People will throw the constitution, from where the name of Allah has been dropped, into dustbin [sic]". He was sued for sedition for this remark, although he argued that it was a figure of speech. On 26 September 2011, the High Court ordered him to surrender to authorities immediately. He spent the remainder of his life under what he termed "house arrest", his movements confined by police to his home and the IOJ party office in Lalbagh Thana, Dhaka.

Amini's madrasa is now used as the Dhaka coordination office of Hefazat a Islam Bangladesh.

== Death ==
He died in Dhaka on 12 December 2012 at 12:20 (GMT+6).

Following his death, his son, Abul Hasnat Amini, became actively involved with Hefazat-e-Islam.

Hefazat-e-Islam, led by Amini's teacher Ahmad Shafi, called for a 13-point movement against the government's policies and the demand of a blasphemy law.

== See more ==
- List of Deobandis
