= Brahmanbaria-2 =

Constituency of Bangladesh's Jatiya Sangsad

Coordinates: 24.07°N 91.11°E

- Constituency for the Jatiya Sangsad
- District: Brahmanbaria District
- Division: Chittagong Division
- Electorate: 499,448 (2026)

Current constituency
- Created: 1984
- Party: Independent
- Member: Rumeen Farhana
- ← 243 Brahmanbaria-1 245 Brahmanbaria-3 →

Brahmanbaria-2 is a constituency represented in the Jatiya Sangsad (National Parliament) of Bangladesh since 2026 by independent politician Rumeen Farhana.

== Boundaries ==
The constituency encompasses Sarail Upazila and Ashuganj Upazila.

== History ==
The constituency was created in 1984 from the Comilla-2 constituency when the former Comilla District was split into three districts: Brahmanbaria, Comilla, and Chandpur.

Ahead of the 2008 general election, the Election Commission redrew constituency boundaries to reflect population changes revealed by the 2001 Bangladesh census. The 2008 redistricting altered the boundaries of the constituency.

Ahead of the 2014 general election, the Election Commission reduced the boundaries of the constituency. Previously it had also included three union parishads of Brahmanbaria Sadar Upazila: Budhanti, Chandura, and Harashpur.

== Members of Parliament ==
Election	Member	Party
1986	Humayun Kabir	Jatiya Party
1991	Abdul Sattar Bhuiyan	Bangladesh Nationalist Party
2001	Fazlul Hoque Amini	Islami Oikya Jote
2008	Ziaul Haque Mridha	Jatiya Party (Ershad)
2014	Ziaul Haque Mridha	Jatiya Party (Ershad)
2018	Abdul Sattar Bhuiyan	Bangladesh Nationalist Party
Feb 2023 by-election	Abdul Sattar Bhuiyan	Independent
Nov 2023 by-election	Md. Shahjahan Alam Shaju	Awami League
2024	Moin Uddin	Independent
2026	Rumeen Farhana	Independent

== Elections ==
=== Elections in the 2020s ===
General election 2026: Brahmanbaria-2
Party	Candidate	Votes	%	±%
Independent	Rumeen Farhana			
JUI	Mohammed Junaid Al Habib			
Majority				
Turnout				
Registered electors		499,448		
Independent hold				

=== Elections in the 2010s ===
General Election 2018: Brahmanbaria-2
Party	Symbol	Candidate	Votes	%	±pp
BNP	Sheaf of paddy	Ukil Abdus Sattar Bhuiyan	83,997	40.51	N/A
Independent	Banana bunch	Md. Moyeen Uddin	75,419	36.38	N/A
Independent	Lion	Md. Ziaul Haque Mridha	39,406	19.01	▼35.74
IAB	Hand fan	Md. Zakir Hossain	3,198	1.54	N/A
Independent	Green coconut	Md. Gias Uddin	2,995	1.44	N/A
CPB	Sickle	Md. Isa Khan	483	0.23	N/A
BIF	Candle	Md. Mohiuddin Molla	472	0.23	N/A
Zaker Party	Rose	Zahirul Islam Jewel	388	0.19	N/A
JP(M)	Bicycle	Mu. Jamilul Haque Bakul	284	0.14	▼0.30
JaPa(E)	Plough	Md. Rezaul Islam Bhuiyan	283	0.14	N/A
JUIB	Date palm	Mohammad Junaid Al Habib	206	0.10	N/A
Gano Forum	Rising sun	Shah Mofiz	134	0.06	▼0.21
Independent	Car	Md. Mukhlesur Rahman	72	0.03	N/A
Valid votes			207,337	93.35	
Invalid votes			14,768	6.65	
Total votes			222,105	100.0	
Registered voters/turnout			335,848	69.08	▲45.27
Majority			8,578	4.14	−6.75
BNP gain from JaPa(E)					

General Election 2014: Brahmanbaria-2
Party	Candidate	Votes	%	±%
JP(E)	Ziaul Haque Mridha	37,508	54.8	−4.8
Independent	Nayar Kabir	30,046	43.9	N/A
Jatiya Party (M)	Md. Jamilul Haque Bakul	302	0.4	N/A
Independent	Abu Shamim Md. Arif	301	0.4	N/A
Independent	Shah Mafiz	183	0.3	N/A
BNF	Md. Habibur Rahman	123	0.2	N/A
Jatiya Samajtantrik Dal-JSD	Abu Bakr Mohammad Firoz	41	0.1	N/A
Majority		7,462	10.9	−9.6
Turnout		68,504	23.4	−56.1
JP(E) hold				

=== Elections in the 2000s ===
General Election 2008: Brahmanbaria-2
Party	Candidate	Votes	%	±%
JP(E)	Ziaul Haque Mrida	143,672	59.6	N/A
IOJ	Fazlul Haque Amini	94,273	39.1	−16.6
NAP	Md. Omar Ali	944	0.4	N/A
IAB	Abdul Hamid	880	0.4	N/A
JSD	Taimur Reza Md. Shazad	532	0.2	N/A
Independent	Abdul Halim	458	0.2	N/A
CPB	Md. Sorif Uddin	372	0.2	N/A
Majority		49,399	20.5	−3.7
Turnout		241,131	79.5	+7.0
JP(E) gain from IOJ				

General Election 2001: Brahmanbaria-2
Party	Candidate	Votes	%	±%
IOJ	Fazlul Hoque Amini	99,804	55.7	+17.6
AL	Abdul Halim	56,543	31.6	−1.3
Independent	Kutub Uddin Chowdhury	9,240	5.2	N/A
IJOF	Lutful Matin	5,397	3.0	N/A
Independent	Md. Abdul Hannan Ratan	3,734	2.1	N/A
Independent	Mizanur Rahman	2,989	1.7	N/A
Jatiya Party (M)	Md. Jaminul Haq	521	0.3	N/A
Independent	Md. Mokarram	409	0.2	N/A
Independent	Abu Shamim Md. Arif	247	0.1	N/A
Independent	Md. Azizur Rahman	138	0.1	N/A
Independent	Akhter Hossain	37	0.0	N/A
Majority		43,261	24.2	+19.1
Turnout		179,059	72.5	−4.7
IOJ gain from BNP				

=== Elections in the 1990s ===
General Election June 1996: Brahmanbaria-2
Party	Candidate	Votes	%	±%
BNP	Ukil Abdul Sattar Bhuiyan	53,932	38.1	−7.1
AL	Abdul Halim	46,682	32.9	+2.9
JP(E)	Md. Mobarak Hossain	16,829	11.9	−0.1
Sammilita Sangram Parishad	Fazlul Hoque Amini	12,567	8.9	N/A
Independent	Md. Jahangir	8,236	5.8	N/A
Independent	Md. Faridul Huda	1,324	0.9	N/A
Jamaat	Sheikh Md. Shahidul Islam	1,074	0.8	N/A
WPB	Sahriar Md. Firo	610	0.4	N/A
Zaker Party	Dewan Omor Faruk	486	0.3	−1.0
Majority		7,250	5.1	−10.0
Turnout		141,740	77.2	+23.8
BNP hold				

General Election 1991: Brahmanbaria-2
Party	Candidate	Votes	%	±%
BNP	A. Satter	52,672	45.2	
AL	Md. Jahirul Haq Khan	35,034	30.0	
JP(E)	Humayun Kabir	13,985	12.0	
Independent	Md. Mobarak Hossain	7,136	6.1	
JSD	Abu Bakr Mohammad Firoz	5,202	4.5	
Zaker Party	Md. Abul Kalam Azad	1,490	1.3	
Jatiya Samajtantrik Dal-JSD	Nurul Aamin	483	0.4	
Democratic League	Ehsanul Haq	453	0.4	
FP	Md. Harun Islam	188	0.2	
Majority		17,638	15.1	
Turnout		116,643	53.4	
BNP gain from JP(E)				
