= Gaibandha-5 =

Constituency of Bangladesh's Jatiya Sangsad

Coordinates: 25.11°N 89.58°E

- Constituency for the Jatiya Sangsad
- District: Gaibandha District
- Division: Rangpur Division
- Electorate: 385,261 (2026)

Current constituency
- Created: 1984
- Party: Bangladesh Jamaat-e-Islami
- Member: Md. Abdul Wares
- ← 32 Gaibandha-4 34 Joypurhat-1 →

Gaibandha-5 is a constituency represented in the Jatiya Sangsad (National Parliament) of Bangladesh since 2026 by Md. Abdul Wares of the Bangladesh Jamaat-e-Islami.

== Boundaries ==
The constituency encompasses Fulchhari and Saghata upazilas.

== History ==
The constituency was created in 1984 from a Rangpur constituency when the former Rangpur District was split into five districts: Nilphamari, Lalmonirhat, Rangpur, Kurigram, and Gaibandha.

== Members of Parliament ==
| Election | Member | Party |
|---|---|---|
| 1986 | Fazle Rabbi Miah | Jatiya Party |
| Feb 1996 | Matiar Rahman Tuku | Independent |
| Jun 1996 | Fazle Rabbi Miah | Jatiya Party |
| 2001 | Rowshan Ershad | Islami Jatiya Oikya Front |
| 2008 | Fazle Rabbi Miah | Awami League |
| 2023 by-election | Mahmud Hasan Ripon | Awami League |
| 2026 | Md. Abdul Wares | Bangladesh Jamaat-e-Islami |

== Elections ==
=== Elections in the 2020s ===
General Election 2026: Gaibandha-5
| Party | Candidate | Votes | % | ±% |
|---|---|---|---|---|
| Jamaat | Md. Abdul Wares | 89,274 | 41.3 | N/A |
| BNP | Md. Farooq Alam Sarkar | 73,483 | 34.0 | N/A |
| Independent | Nahiduzzaman Nishad | 37,586 | 17.4 | |
| Independent | AHM Golam Shaheed Ranju | 8,706 | 4.0 | N/A |
| JP(E) | Shamim Haider Patwary | 3,427 | 1.6 | |
| IAB | Md. Azizul Islam | 2,207 | 1.0 | N/A |
| Independent | Hasan Mehdi Bidyut | 499 | 0.2 | N/A |
| CPB | Shri Nirmal | 468 | 0.2 | N/A |
| BSD (Marxist) | Ms. Rahela Khatun | 249 | 0.1 | N/A |
| Majority | | 15,791 | 7.3 | N/A |
| Turnout | | 215,899 | 56.0 | N/A |
| Jamaat gain from AL | | | | |

Fazle Rabbi Miah died in July 2022. Mahmud Hasan Ripon was elected in a January 2023 by-election.

By-election: Gaibandha-5, 2023
| Party | Candidate | Votes | % | ±% |
|---|---|---|---|---|
| AL | Mahmud Hasan Ripon | 78,276 | 60.39 | N/A |
| JP(E) | A. H. M. Golam Shahid Ranju | 44,950 | 34.68 | N/A |
| Independent | Syed Md. Mahbubur Rahman | 2,950 | 2.27 | N/A |
| BDB | Md. Jahangir Alam | 1,796 | 1.38 | N/A |
| Independent | Nahiduzzaman Nishad | 1,640 | 1.26 | N/A |
| Majority | | 33,326 | 25.71 | N/A |
| Turnout | | 129,612 | 38.23 | N/A |
| AL hold | | | | |

=== Elections in the 2010s ===
Fazle Rabbi Miah was re-elected unopposed in the 2014 general election after opposition parties withdrew their candidacies in a boycott of the election.

=== Elections in the 2000s ===
General Election 2008: Gaibandha-5
| Party | Candidate | Votes | % | ±% |
|---|---|---|---|---|
| AL | Fazle Rabbi Miah | 98,461 | 44.6 | +4.3 |
| JP(E) | Rowshan Ershad | 94,143 | 42.7 | N/A |
| BNP | Md. Hasan Ali | 27,066 | 12.3 | +6.9 |
| BSD | Md. Noushaduzzaman | 486 | 0.2 | N/A |
| BDB | Md. Sahif Uddin Kazol | 433 | 0.2 | N/A |
| Bangladesh Kalyan Party | Azharul Islam | 105 | 0.0 | N/A |
| Majority | | 4,318 | 2.0 | −9.4 |
| Turnout | | 220,694 | 88.6 | +16.2 |
| AL gain from IJOF | | | | |

General Election 2001: Gaibandha-5
| Party | Candidate | Votes | % | ±% |
|---|---|---|---|---|
| IJOF | Rowshan Ershad | 93,432 | 51.7 | N/A |
| AL | Fazle Rabbi Miah | 72,804 | 40.3 | +10.1 |
| BNP | Rostam Ali Molla | 9,797 | 5.4 | −4.4 |
| WPB | Md. A. Rouf | 1,226 | 0.7 | N/A |
| Independent | Md. Makhsedur Rahman | 1,115 | 0.6 | N/A |
| Independent | Md. A. Taher | 1,099 | 0.6 | N/A |
| Independent | Md. Nuran Nabi Pradhan | 985 | 0.6 | N/A |
| JSD | Shah Md. Matiar Rahman | 137 | 0.1 | N/A |
| Jatiya Party (M) | Maroof Akter | 85 | 0.1 | N/A |
| Majority | | 20,628 | 11.4 | −9.9 |
| Turnout | | 180,680 | 72.4 | 0.0 |
| IJOF gain from JP(E) | | | | |

=== Elections in the 1990s ===
General Election June 1996: Gaibandha-5
| Party | Candidate | Votes | % | ±% |
|---|---|---|---|---|
| JP(E) | Fazle Rabbi Miah | 69,094 | 51.5 | +11.7 |
| AL | Md. Habibur Rahman | 40,478 | 30.2 | +3.6 |
| BNP | Md. Matiur Rahman | 13,188 | 9.8 | −4.3 |
| Jamaat | Md. Salim Uddin Bepary | 10,077 | 7.5 | −8.0 |
| Gano Forum | Golzar Rahman | 450 | 0.3 | N/A |
| Independent | Nakibuddin | 327 | 0.2 | N/A |
| Zaker Party | Bazlur Rashid Prodhan | 252 | 0.2 | 0.0 |
| FP | Md. Kamal Pasa Badsa | 239 | 0.2 | N/A |
| Majority | | 28,616 | 21.3 | +8.1 |
| Turnout | | 134,105 | 72.4 | +19.7 |
| JP(E) hold | | | | |

General Election 1991: Gaibandha-5
| Party | Candidate | Votes | % | ±% |
|---|---|---|---|---|
| JP(E) | Fazle Rabbi Miah | 43,816 | 39.8 | |
| AL | Md. Nurunnabi Pradhan | 29,258 | 26.6 | |
| Jamaat | Abdul Gafur | 17,056 | 15.5 | |
| BNP | Rostam Ali Molla | 15,545 | 14.1 | |
| JSD (S) | Belal Hossain Yusuf | 2,256 | 2.1 | |
| BAKSAL | Ataur Rahman | 1,623 | 1.5 | |
| Zaker Party | Lutfar Rahman | 190 | 0.2 | |
| Jatiya Samajtantrik Dal-JSD | Md. Abu Zafar Sarkar | 172 | 0.2 | |
| WPB | Aminul Islam Mia | 108 | 0.1 | |
| Majority | | 14,558 | 13.2 | |
| Turnout | | 110,024 | 52.7 | |
| JP(E) hold | | | | |
