= Md. Golam Mostofa Biswas =

Bangladeshi politician

Md. Golam Mostofa
- মুহাঃ গোলাম মোস্তফা
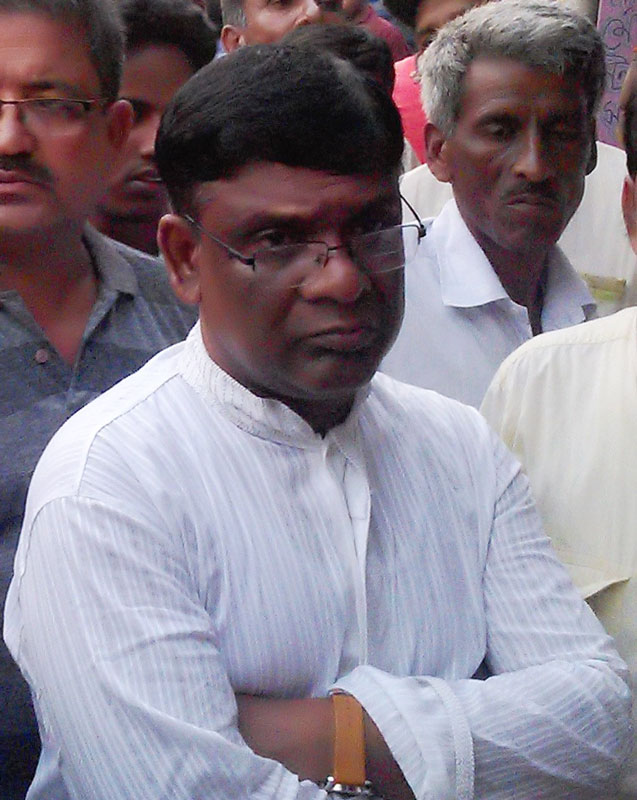
- Md. Golam Mostofa Biswas

Jatiya Sangsad Member from Chapai Nawabganj-2 constituency
- In office 2014–2018
- Preceded by: Md. Ziaur Rahman
- Succeeded by: Md. Aminul Islam

Personal details
- Born: 11 June 1967 (age 59)
- Party: Bangladesh Awami League

Md. Golam Mostofa Biswas is a Bangladesh Awami League politician and a former Member of Parliament from Chapai Nawabganj-2 constituency.

== Early life ==
Biswas was born on 11 June 1967. He has B.A. L.L.B. and a M.Sc. degrees.

== Career ==
Biswas was elected to Parliament from Chapai Nawabganj-2 on 5 January 2014 as a Bangladesh Awami League candidate. He was denied a Bangladesh Awami League nomination for 2018 parliamentary elections.
