= Md. Mokhlesur Rahman =

Bangladeshi politician

Member of Bangladesh Parliament
- In office 1991–1996
- Preceded by: Hafiz Uddin Ahmed
- Succeeded by: Emdadul Haque

Personal details
- Party: Bangladesh Awami League

Md. Mokhlesur Rahman is a Bangladesh Awami League politician and a former member of parliament for Thakurgaon-3.

== Career ==
Rahman was elected to parliament from Thakurgaon-3 as a Bangladesh Awami League candidate in 1991.
