= Thakurgaon-3 =

Constituency of Bangladesh's Jatiya Sangsad

Coordinates: 23.64°N 88.85°E

- Constituency for the Jatiya Sangsad
- District: Thakurgaon District
- Division: Rangpur Division
- Electorate: 364,129 (2026)

Current constituency
- Created: 1984
- Party: Bangladesh Nationalist Party
- Member: Jahidur Rahman
- ← 4 Thakurgaon-2 6 Dinajpur-1 →

Thakurgaon-3 is a constituency represented in the Jatiya Sangsad (National Parliament) of Bangladesh since 2026 by Jahidur Rahman of the Bangladesh Nationalist Party.

== Boundaries ==
The constituency encompasses Pirganj Upazila, Ranisankail Municipality, and six union parishads of Ranisankail Upazila: Bachor, Hossain Gaon, Lehemba, Nonduar, Nekmarad, and Raton.

== History ==
The constituency was created in 1984 from the Dinajpur-5 constituency when the former Dinajpur District was split into three districts: Panchagarh, Thakurgaon, and Dinajpur.

== Members of Parliament ==
Election	Member	Party
1986	Muhammad Shahidullah	Communist Party of Bangladesh
1988	Hafiz Uddin Ahmed	Jatiya Party
1991	Md. Mokhlesur Rahman	Awami League
Feb 1996	Abdul Malek	Bangladesh Nationalist Party
Jun 1996	Emdadul Haque	Awami League
2001	Hafiz Uddin Ahmed	Islami Jatiya Oikya Front
2008	Hafiz Uddin Ahmed	Jatiya Party (Ershad)
2014	Yeasin Ali	Workers Party of Bangladesh
2018	Jahidur Rahman	Bangladesh Nationalist Party
2023 by-election	Hafiz Uddin Ahmed	Jatiya Party (Ershad)
2026	Jahidur Rahman	Bangladesh Nationalist Party

== Elections ==
=== Elections in the 2020s ===
General Election 2026: Thakurgaon-3
Party	Candidate	Votes	%	±%
BNP	Jahidur Rahman	132,797	51.7	N/A
Jamaat	Md. Mizanur Rahman	91,934	35.8	N/A
JP(E)	Hafiz Uddin Ahmed	27,133	10.6	N/A
CPB	Provat Somir Shahjahan Alam	1,548	0.6	N/A
IAB	Md. Al-Amin	1,295	0.5	N/A
BMJP	Kamala Kanto Roy	680	0.3	N/A
GOP	Md. Mamunur Rashid Mamun	552	0.2	N/A
BSP	Md. Abul Kalam Azad	503	0.2	N/A
Independent	Mst. Asha Moni	279	0.1	N/A
BML	S. M. Khalilur Rahman Sarkar	113	0.0	N/A
Majority		40,863	15.9	N/A
Turnout		256,834	70.5	N/A
Registered electors		364,129		
BNP gain from JP(E)				

=== Elections in the 2010s ===
General Election 2014: Thakurgaon-3
Party	Candidate	Votes	%	±%
WPB	Yeasin Ali	62,118	62.2	+60.3
JP(E)	Hafiz Uddin Ahmed	37,673	37.8	−36.2
Majority		24,445	24.5	−28.0
Turnout		99,791	37.7	−53.7
WPB gain from JP(E)				

=== Elections in the 2000s ===
General Election 2008: Thakurgaon-3
Party	Candidate	Votes	%	±%
JP(E)	Hafiz Uddin Ahmed	160,107	74.0	N/A
BNP	Jahidur Rahman	46,545	21.5	+16.8
CPB	Monsurul Alam	4,438	2.1	+1.2
WPB	Shahidullah Sahid	4,060	1.9	N/A
IAB	Abul Hasan Kasemi	745	0.3	N/A
BDB	Mirza Md. Habibullah Chowdhury	380	0.2	N/A
Majority		113,562	52.5	+46.6
Turnout		216,275	91.4	+4.0
JP(E) gain from IJOF				

General Election 2001: Thakurgaon-3
Party	Candidate	Votes	%	±%
IJOF	Hafiz Uddin Ahmed	89,468	50.1	N/A
AL	Emdadul Haque	78,998	44.3	+0.5
BNP	Jahidur Rahman	8,359	4.7	−2.4
CPB	Monsurul Alam	1,656	0.9	−0.2
Majority		10,470	5.9	+3.1
Turnout		178,481	87.4	+10.0
IJOF gain from AL				

=== Elections in the 1990s ===
General Election June 1996: Thakurgaon-3
Party	Candidate	Votes	%	±%
AL	Emdadul Haque	55,953	43.8	+1.6
JP(E)	Md. Ikramul Hauqe	52,342	41.0	+8.6
BNP	Abdul Malek	9,060	7.1	N/A
Jamaat	Mizanur Rahman	8,081	6.3	−8.7
CPB	Md. Monsurul Rahman	1,439	1.1	N/A
Zaker Party	Nazimuddin Ahmed	415	0.3	−8.7
Independent	Kazi Jafar Ahmed	333	0.3	N/A
Majority		3,611	2.8	−7.0
Turnout		127,623	77.4	+8.4
AL hold				

General Election 1991: Thakurgaon-3
Party	Candidate	Votes	%	±%
AL	Md. Mokhlesur Rahman	50,221	42.2	
JP(E)	Hafiz Uddin Ahmed	38,538	32.4	
Jamaat	Mizanur Rahman	17,841	15.0	
NAP (Muzaffar)	A. Malek	6,461	5.4	
BNP	Zahedur Ruman	5,107	4.3	
Zaker Party	Md. Abdur Rahman	424	0.4	
UCL	Shahidullah Shahid	335	0.3	
Majority		11,683	9.8	
Turnout		118,927	69.0	
AL gain from JP(E)				
