= Brahmanbaria-3 =

Bangladeshi parliamentary constituency

Coordinates: 23.96°N 91.11°E

- Constituency for the Jatiya Sangsad
- District: Brahmanbaria District
- Division: Chittagong Division
- Electorate: 624,601 (2026)

Current constituency
- Created: 1984
- Party: Bangladesh Nationalist Party
- Member: Khaled Hossain Mahbub
- ← 244 Brahmanbaria-2 246 Brahmanbaria-4 →

Brahmanbaria-3 is a constituency represented in the Jatiya Sangsad (National Parliament) of Bangladesh since 2026 by Khaled Hossain Mahbub of the Bangladesh Nationalist Party.

== Boundaries ==
The constituency encompasses Bijoynagar and Brahmanbaria Sadar upazilas.

== History ==
The constituency was created in 1984 from the Comilla-3 constituency when the former Comilla District was split into three districts: Brahmanbaria, Comilla, and Chandpur.

Ahead of the 2008 general election, the Election Commission redrew constituency boundaries to reflect population changes revealed by the 2001 Bangladesh census. The 2008 redistricting altered the boundaries of the constituency.

Ahead of the 2014 general election, the Election Commission expanded the boundaries of the constituency to include all of the former Brahmanbaria Sadar (which in 2010 had been split into a smaller Brahmanbaria Sadar Upazila and the new Bijoynagar Upazila). Previously the constituency had excluded six union parishads: Budhal, Budhanti, Chandura, Harashpur, Majlishpur, and Purba Talsahar.

== Members of Parliament ==
Election	Member	Party
1986	Humayun Kabir	Jatiya Party
1991	Haroon Al Rashid	Bangladesh Nationalist Party
Jun 1996	Haroon Al Rashid	Bangladesh Nationalist Party
2001	Haroon Al Rashid	Bangladesh Nationalist Party
2008	Lutful Hai Sachchu	Awami League
2011 by-election	Obaidul Muktadir Chowdhury	Awami League
2026	Khaled Hossain Mahbub	Bangladesh Nationalist Party

== Elections ==
=== Elections in the 2010s ===
General Election 2014: Brahmanbaria-3
Party	Candidate	Votes	%	±%
AL	Obaidul Muktadir Chowdhury	268,029	95.0	
JP(E)	Mohammad Farid Ahmed	6,786	2.4	
BNF	Zahirul Hoque Bhuiyan	4,622	1.6	
BIF	Syed Naim Uddin Ahmed	2,585	0.9	
Majority		261,243	92.6	
Turnout		282,022	63.4	
AL hold				

Lutful Hai Sachchu died in November 2010. Obaidul Muktadir Chowdhury of the Awami League was elected in a January 2011 by-election, defeating BNP candidate Khaled Mahbub.

=== Elections in the 2000s ===
General Election 2008: Brahmanbaria-3
Party	Candidate	Votes	%	±%
AL	Lutful Hai Sachchu	160,052	63.9	+20.0
BNP	Haroon Al Rashid	86,587	34.6	−18.9
IAB	Niazul Karim	1,693	0.7	N/A
Zaker Party	Md. Salim Kabir	1,360	0.5	N/A
Independent	Jahirul Haque Chawdhury	458	0.2	N/A
Gano Forum	Mohammad Forid Ahmed	137	0.0	N/A
PDP	Borhan Uddin Ahmed	110	0.0	N/A
Majority		73,465	29.3	+19.7
Turnout		250,397	85.9	+13.7
AL gain from BNP				

General Election 2001: Brahmanbaria-3
Party	Candidate	Votes	%	±%
BNP	Haroon Al Rashid	150,074	53.5	+18.7
AL	Humayun Kabir	123,158	43.9	+11.2
IJOF	Md. Rezaul Islam	6,348	2.3	N/A
KSJL	Salim Mia	474	0.2	N/A
WPB	Shahriar Md. Firoz	300	0.1	N/A
Jatiya Party (M)	Md. Samad Ali	137	0.1	N/A
Majority		26,916	9.6	+7.5
Turnout		280,491	72.2	−4.8
BNP hold				

=== Elections in the 1990s ===
General Election June 1996: Brahmanbaria-3
Party	Candidate	Votes	%	±%
BNP	Haroon Al Rashid	77,204	34.8	−0.8
AL	Lutful Hai Sachchu	72,525	32.7	+2.4
JP(E)	Humayun Kabir	64,347	29.0	−2.8
Jamaat	Rostom Ali Sarkar	4,842	2.2	N/A
Zaker Party	M. A. Malek	687	0.3	−0.5
IOJ	Abdur Rahim Hazari	634	0.3	N/A
Sammilita Sangram Parishad	Fazlul Hoque Anini	395	0.2	N/A
Saat Dalio Jote (Mirpur)	Sakhawat Matin Bhuiyan	315	0.1	N/A
BKA	Muzibur Rahman Hamidi	308	0.1	N/A
Independent	Azizur Rahman	145	0.1	N/A
Gano Forum	Showkat Ara Begum	137	0.1	N/A
Independent	Md. Faridul Huda	98	0.0	N/A
Majority		4,679	2.1	−1.7
Turnout		221,637	77.0	+22.2
BNP hold				

General Election 1991: Brahmanbaria-3
Party	Candidate	Votes	%	±%
BNP	Haroon Al Rashid	62,842	35.6	
JP(E)	Humayun Kabir	56,178	31.8	
AL	Lutful Hai Sachchu	53,456	30.3	
Zaker Party	Abdul Oahab	1,449	0.8	
Independent	Munnuzan Begam	968	0.5	
Muslim Peoples Party	Muhammad Jahangir	515	0.3	
CPB	Somesh Ranjan Roy	482	0.3	
Independent	Mashiyur Rahman	269	0.2	
Independent	Shakhawat Matin Bhuiyan	247	0.1	
Majority		6,664	3.8	
Turnout		176,406	54.8	
BNP hold				
