= Muhammad Shahidullah (politician) =

Bangladeshi politician

Member of Bangladesh Parliament
- In office 1986–1988
- Succeeded by: Hafiz Uddin Ahmed

Personal details
- Party: Communist Party of Bangladesh

Muhammad Shahidullah is a Communist Party of Bangladesh politician and a former member of parliament for Thakurgaon-3.

== Career ==
Shahidullah was elected to parliament from Thakurgaon-3 as a Communist Party of Bangladesh candidate in 1986.
