= Jahidur Rahman =

Bangladeshi politician

- জাহিদুর রহমান
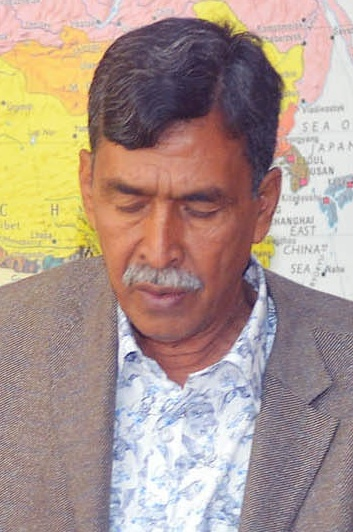
- Rahman in 2019

Member of Parliament
- Incumbent
- Assumed office 17 February 2026
- Preceded by: Hafiz Uddin Ahmed
- Constituency: Thakurgaon-3
- In office 7 January 2019 – 11 December 2022
- Preceded by: Yeasin Ali
- Succeeded by: Hafiz Uddin Ahmed
- Constituency: Thakurgaon-3

Personal details
- Born: 11 January 1959 (age 67) Thakurgaon, East Pakistan, Pakistan
- Party: Bangladesh Nationalist Party
- Website: jahidurforpeople.com

Jahidur Rahman (born 11 January 1959) is a Bangladesh Nationalist Party politician and a former Jatiya Sangsad member representing the Thakurgaon-3 constituency. He resigned from the position on 11 December 2022.
