= Matiar Rahman Tuku =

Bangladeshi politician

- মতিয়র রহমান টুকু

Member of Parliament for Gaibandha-5
- In office 15 February 1996 – 12 June 1996
- Preceded by: Fazle Rabbi Miah
- Succeeded by: Fazle Rabbi Miah

Personal details
- Born: Gaibandha District
- Party: Bangladesh Nationalist Party

Matiar Rahman Tuku is a Bangladesh Nationalist Party politician. He was elected a member of parliament from Gaibandha-5 in February 1996.

== Career ==
Tuku was elected to parliament from Gaibandha-5 as an independent candidate in 15 February 1996 Bangladeshi general election. He was defeated in the 7th Jatiya Sangsad elections on 12 June 1996 as a candidate of Bangladesh Nationalist Party from Gaibandha-5 constituency.
