= Mu. Mizanur Rahman =

Bangladeshi politician

- মু: মিজানুর রহমান
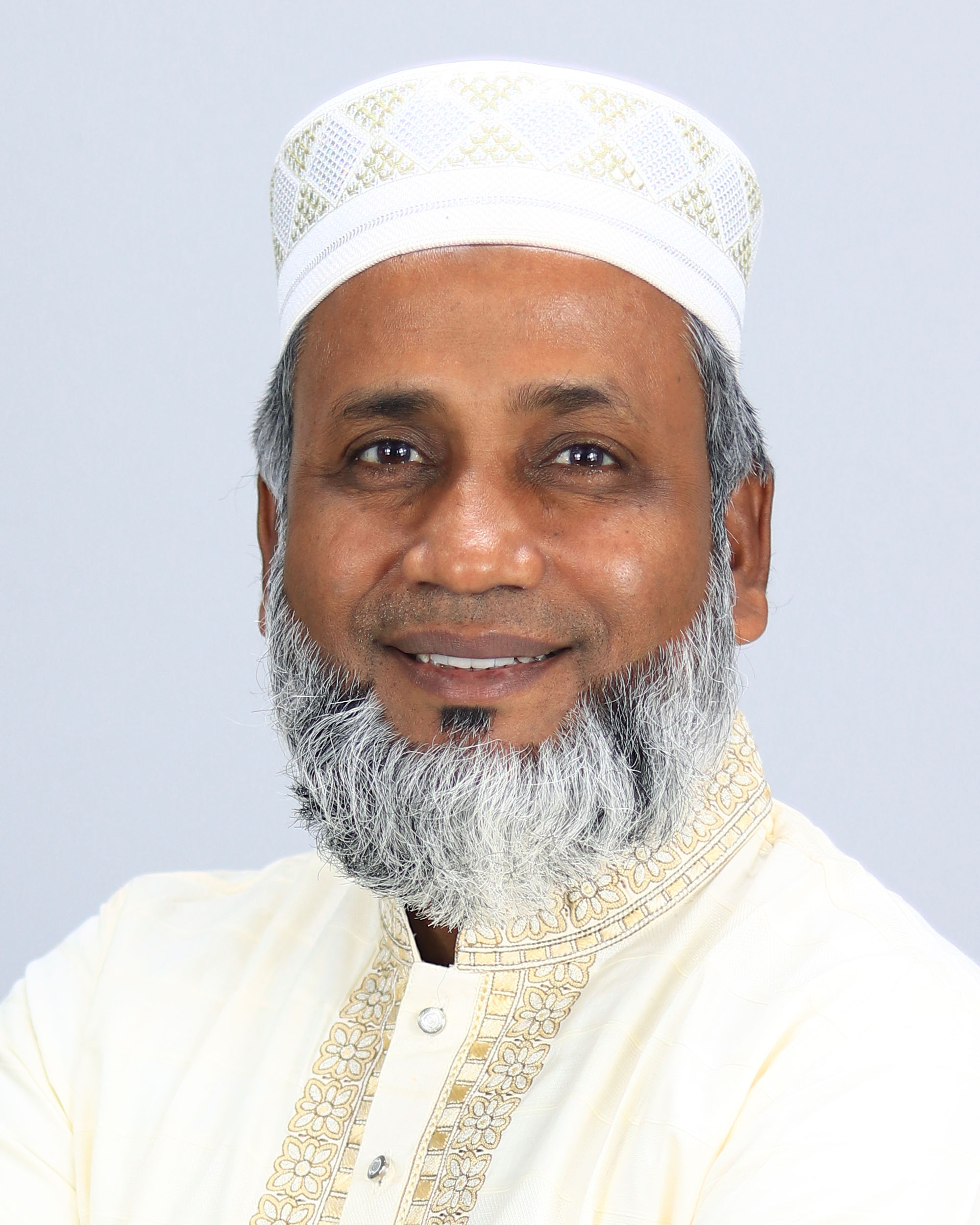
- Rahman in 2025

Member of Parliament
- Incumbent
- Assumed office 17 February 2026
- Preceded by: Md. Ziaur Rahman
- Constituency: Chapai Nawabganj-2

Personal details
- Born: Gomastapur, Chapai Nawabganj
- Party: Bangladesh Jamaat-e-Islami
- Education: University of Rajshahi
- Occupation: Politician, teacher

Mu. Mizanur Rahman is a Bangladeshi politician and a member of the 13th Jatiya Sangsad (National Parliament). He was elected as a member of parliament from the Chapai Nawabganj-2 constituency in the 2026 13th Jatiya Sangsad election as a candidate nominated by Bangladesh Jamaat-e-Islami.

== Early life and education ==
Mizanur Rahman was born in Rahanpur in Gomostapur Upazila of Chapai Nawabganj District, Bangladesh. His father is Mu. Lobjan Biswas and his mother is Mosa. Begum Bahar. He completed his secondary education in the science group from Rahanpur A.B. Government High School and passed higher secondary from Nawabganj Government College. He obtained his bachelor's and master's degrees in botany from the University of Rajshahi, and later earned a PhD degree from the Institute of Environmental Science at the same university.

== Career ==
In 2001, he joined Rahanpur P.M Ideal College as a lecturer in biology. He has been working in the teaching profession for a long time. In 2023, he was selected as the best classroom teacher at the college level in Gomostapur Upazila.
