= Mar Chokka =

Bangladeshi film

- Movie poster
- Directed by: Moin Biswas
- Produced by: Moin Biswas
- Starring: Hero Alom; Omar Sani; Sadek Bachchu; Alexander Bo
- Music by: Ali Akram Shuvo
- Production company: Jyoti Films International
- Distributed by: Jyoti Films International
- Release date: 11 August 2017
- Running time: 146m
- Country: Bangladesh
- Language: Bengali

Mar Chokka (Bengali: মার ছক্কা) is a Bengali film directed by Sopnil Khan produced by Moin Biswas and music by Ali Akram Shuvo. It is distributed by Jyoti Films International. It stars Omar Sani, Sadek Bachchu and Hero Alom. It was declared disaster film of the year.

== Cast ==
- Omar Sani
- Hero Alom
- Nerjon Raju
- Sadek Bacchu
- Alexander Bo

== Soundtrack ==
Dream Persona

Soundtrack album by Ali Akram Shuvo
- Released: 11 August 2017
- Recorded: 2017
- Genre: Feature film soundtrack
- Length: 23:12
- Language: Bangla
- Label: Jyoti Films

The soundtrack was composed by Ali Akram Shuvo.

Track list
No.	Title	Lyrics	Artist(s)	Length
1.	"Amar Janemaan"	Ali Akram Shuvo	Ali Akram Shuvo	2:54
2.	"Meeg Kaalo Cul"	Ali Akram Shuvo	Ali Akram Shuvo	4:16
3.	"Valo Lage Ree"	Ali Akram Shuvo	Ali Akram Shuvo	4:18
4.	"Sobkichu Aaj"	Ali Akram Shuvo	Ali Akram Shuvo	4:33
5.	"Boro Beshi Dekhte Icchha Kore"		Samina Chowdhury, Belal Khan
6.	"Noyone Noyone"		Imran Mahmudul
Total length:				16:01
