= Chapai Nawabganj-2 =

Constituency of Bangladesh's Jatiya Sangsad

Coordinates: 24.73°N 88.38°E

- Constituency for the Jatiya Sangsad
- District: Chapai Nawabganj District
- Division: Rajshahi Division
- Electorate: 431,042 (2026)

Current constituency
- Created: 1984
- Party: Bangladesh Jamaat-e-Islami
- Member: Mu. Mizanur Rahman
- ← 43 Chapai Nawabganj-1 45 Chapai Nawabganj-3 →

Chapai Nawabganj-2 is a constituency represented in the Jatiya Sangsad (National Parliament) of Bangladesh since 2026 by Mu. Mizanur Rahman of the Bangladesh Jamaat-e-Islami.

== Boundaries ==
The constituency encompasses Nachole, Gomostapur, Bholahat.

== History ==
The constituency was created in 1984 from the Rajshahi-2 constituency when the former Rajshahi District was split into four districts: Nawabganj, Naogaon, Rajshahi, and Natore.

== Members of Parliament ==
Election	Member	Party
1979	Syed Monjur Hossain	Bangladesh Nationalist Party
1986	Mim Obaidullah	Bangladesh Jamaat-e-Islami
1988	Salah Uddin Ahmed	Jatiya Party
1991	Syed Monjur Hossain	Bangladesh Nationalist Party
1996	Syed Monjur Hossain	Bangladesh Nationalist Party
2001	Syed Monjur Hossain	Bangladesh Nationalist Party
2008	Md. Ziaur Rahman	Awami League
2014	Md. Golam Mostofa Biswas	Awami League
2018	Md. Aminul Islam	Bangladesh Nationalist Party
2023 by-election	Md. Ziaur Rahman	Awami League
2026	Mu. Mizanur Rahman	Bangladesh Jamaat-e-Islami

== Elections ==
=== Elections in the 2020s ===
General election 2026: Chapai Nawabganj-2
Party	Candidate	Votes	%	±%
BNP	Md. Aminul Islam			
Jamaat	Md. Mizanur Rahman			
IAB	Md. Ibrahim Khalil			
JP(E)	Md. Khorshid Alom			
CPB	Md. Sadekul Islam			
Majority				
Turnout				
