= Afroza Haque Rina =

Bangladeshi politician

- আফরোজা হক রীনা
- Preceded by: Rumeen Farhana

Personal details
- Citizenship: Bangladesh
- Party: Jatiya Samajtantrik Dal-JaSaD (Inu)
- Spouse: Hasanul Haque Inu
- Occupation: Politics
- Known for: Women's rights activist

Afroza Haque Rina (Bengali: আফরোজা হক রীনা) is a Bangladeshi politician and women's rights activist. She was also a member of the Jatiya Sangsad from the Reserved Seat for Woman-50. She is also serving as the vice-president of JaSaD. On 11 December 2022, BNP MPs resigned from the 11th National Parliament and the reserved seat No. 50 became vacant. Later she filed her nomination papers on this seat and was elected unopposed.

== Career ==
Afroza Haque was associated with the East Pakistan Chhatra League while studying at Eden Mohila College. In 1969, she was elected to the post of social service secretary in the student parliament elections. In 1998, she became a member of JSD council for the first time. She is a member of the JSD standing committee headed by Inu. She is also serving as the Central Convener of the National Women's Alliance.

She was elected Member of Parliament on 6 March 2023 in the reserved women's seat of the National Parliament.

== Personal life ==
Afroza was born on 5 October 1951, in Nawabganj, Dhaka. In 1975, she married politician Hasanul Haque Inu.
