= Md. Abdul Wares =

Bangladeshi politician (born 1952)

- মোহাম্মদ আব্দুল ওয়ারেস

Member of Parliament
- Incumbent
- Assumed office 17 February 2026
- Preceded by: Mahmud Hasan Ripon
- Constituency: Gaibandha-5

Personal details
- Born: 31 July 1952 (age 74)
- Party: Bangladesh Jamaat-e-Islami
- Occupation: Politician

Mohammad Abdul Wares (born 31 July 1952) is a Bangladeshi politician of the Bangladesh Jamaat-e-Islami and freedom fighter who has been serving as the Member of Parliament representing Gaibandha-5.
