= Fazle Rabbi Miah =

Bangladeshi politician (1946–2022)

Md. Fazle Rabbi Miah
- ফজলে রাব্বী মিয়া
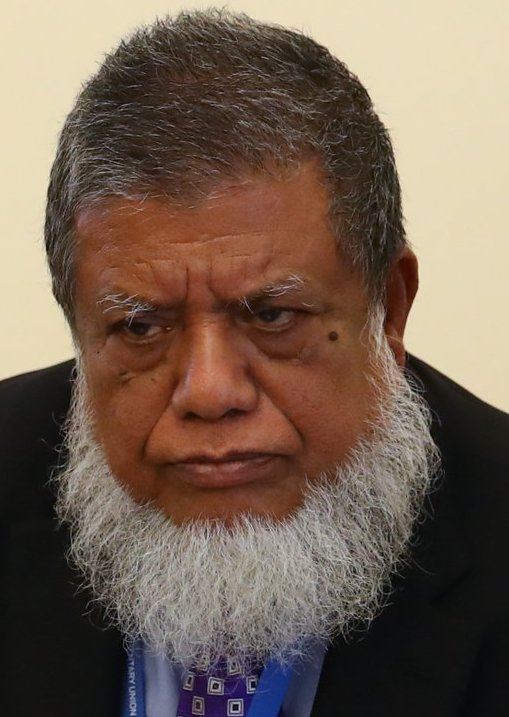
- Miah in 2017

12th Deputy Speaker of the Jatiya Sangsad
- In office 24 January 2014 – 22 July 2022
- Speaker: Shirin Sharmin Chaudhury
- Preceded by: Shawkat Ali
- Succeeded by: Shamsul Hoque Tuku

Member of Parliament for Gaibandha-5
- In office 25 January 2009 – 22 July 2022
- Preceded by: Rowshan Ershad
- Succeeded by: Mahmud Hasan Ripon
- In office 14 July 1996 – 13 July 2001
- Preceded by: Matiar Rahman Tuku
- Succeeded by: Rowshan Ershad
- In office 10 July 1986 – 24 November 1995
- Preceded by: Position created
- Succeeded by: Matiar Rahman Tuku

Personal details
- Born: 15 April 1946 Gaibandha, Bengal Province, British India
- Died: 22 July 2022 (aged 76) New York City, United States
- Party: Bangladesh Awami League
- Spouse: Anwara Begum
- Profession: Lawyer, politician

Md. Fazle Rabbi Miah (16 April 1946 – 22 July 2022) was a Bangladesh Awami League politician, who served as the deputy speaker of the Jatiya Sangsad and also a member representing the Gaibandha-5 constituency for seven terms. He was a member of the Awami League Central Committee. Before joining Awami League, he won four times as member of parliament from Jatiya Party (Ershad).

== Early life ==
Miah was born on 16 April 1946 in Gaibandha District.

== Career ==
From 1978 to 1979, Miah was secretary of the District Bar Association, Gaibandha.

From 1980 to 1981, Miah was the chairperson of the Gaibandha District unit of Bangladesh Association for Voluntary Sterilization.

== Personal life and death ==
Miah was married to Anwara Begum until her death in 2020.

Miah died on 23 July 2022 at The Mount Sinai Hospital in New York City.
