= R. A. M. Obaidul Muktadir Chowdhury =

Bangladeshi politician

Obaidul Muktadir Chowdhury
- উবায়দুল মোকতাদির চৌধুরী
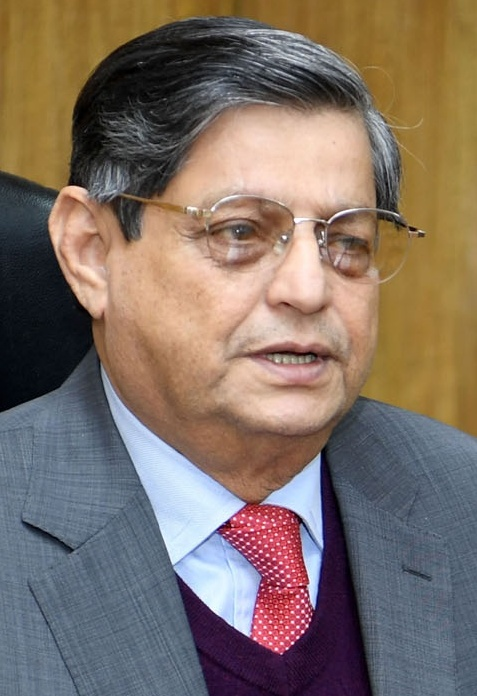
- Chowdhury in 2024

Minister of Housing and Public Works
- In office 11 January 2024 – 6 August 2024
- Preceded by: Sharif Ahmed (as State Minister)
- Succeeded by: Adilur Rahman Khan (as Advisor)

Member of the Bangladesh Parliament for Brahmanbaria-3
- In office 2011 – 6 August 2024
- Preceded by: Lutful Hai Sachchu

Personal details
- Born: 1 March 1955 (age 71) Brahmanbaria, East Bengal, Pakistan
- Party: Bangladesh Awami League
- Education: Dhaka College; University of Dhaka; Asian Institute of Technology

R. A. M. Obaidul Muktadir Chowdhury is a Bangladesh Awami League politician and a former minister of housing and public works of Bangladesh and a former Jatiya Sangsad member representing the Brahmanbaria-3 constituency.

== Early life and education ==
Chowdhury was born on 1 March 1955 in Brahmanbaria to Abdul Rouf Chowdhury and Mosammat Halima Khatun Chowdhury. He earned his BSS and MSS degrees from the University of Dhaka. Besides he also studied Diploma in Rural Poverty Alleviation Asian Institute of Technology Bangkok. Chowdhury is a political figure, a dedicated social worker, education enthusiast and cultural activist. He is involved in various educational institutions and activities. He was received primary education at village school in Narayanganj. In 1969, he passed the Fazil examination securing 16th position in the first division from Madrasah-e-Alia, Dhaka. He passed the first division in 1972 from Dhaka College obtaining the Higher Secondary Certificate HSC (Humanities). In 1975, due to the situation of being underground after the assassination of Bangabandhu Sheikh Mujibur Rahman in 1971, he was arrested while returning from New Market area after attending a rally at Dhaka University. He took part in the Honors examination while in jail. In 1981, He obtained a master's degree in political science. In 1996 He also obtained a diploma in rural poverty alleviation in Asian Institute of Technology. In 2011, he was elected as a member of parliament in the 9th parliament, 10th parliament, 11th parliament and 12th parliament. He was also a Senate member in University of Dhaka. He was a president of the district Awami League, Brahmanbaria. and was a president of Brahmanbaria district committee.

== Role in the Liberation War ==
In 1971, he was responding the call from Sheikh Mujibur Rahman, he participated in the Bangladesh Liberation War as a Mukti Bahini and a leader of the Mujib Bahini in a sub-district. He was injured during the war and He was a war-wounded freedom fighter (Gazette No.-2385).

== Political and career ==
Chowdhury served as the Co-General Secretary of Bangladesh Chhatra League Central Student Council in 1970. In 1971, while participating in the Bangladesh liberation war under Mujib's forces, he was injured in one of his legs by firing from Pakistani forces. In 1973-74, he was the Central Chhatra League's publications and publications editor and in 1975, when Bakshal was formed, he was nominated as a member of the 21-member National Chhatra League Central Committee.

When the assassination of Sheikh Mujibur Rahman took place in 1975, Chowdhury contributed to the development of the nationwide democratic student movement and resistance struggle.

He participated as one of the organizers and participants in the first protest rally organized in protest of the assassination of Sheikh Mujibur Rahman on 20 October 1975, starting from the Bottola of Dhaka University and ending at Bangabandhu Bhaban. He was sheltered in India and upon return from India, arrested on the way back to Dhaka University and imprisoned for 23 months. In 1976, while in hiding, arrested on the way back to Dhaka University after participating in a rally at New Market. Familiar to student activists under the name Rabiul Alam Choudhury, he spent 23 months in captivity. He was released upon the directive of the High Court Division of the Bangladesh Supreme Court. He joined the Civil Service Administration Cadre in 1983. He served as private secretary to the prime minister and held various important positions until 2001. He also served as assistant private secretary to the then opposition leader Sheikh Hasina in 1986. In 1996, played a significant role as one of the organizers in the platform "Janatar Mancha" formed by the Bangladesh Civil Service Officers against the unilateral elections called by Khaleda Zia. Following this, he was arrested in October 1976 and imprisoned for almost 2 years and was released in September 1978 on the orders of the High Court.

After passing the BCS examination in 1983, Chowdhury joined the administration cadre and in 1986 served as private assistant secretary to the leader of the opposition in the Jatiya Sangsad, Sheikh Hasina.

In 1996, Chowdhury played an important role as one of the organizers of the Janata Manch, which consisted of Bangladesh Civil Service officers, against the unilateral election by Khaleda Zia. From 1996-2001 served as the private secretary of Prime Minister Sheikh Hasina. Later left the government job and joined politics He was nominated twice as a member of Bangladesh Awami League Central Executive Committee. At present, he is successfully serving as the president of Brahmanbaria district Awami League.
