= Aminul Islam (Bangladeshi politician) =

Bangladeshi politician

- আমিনুল ইসলাম
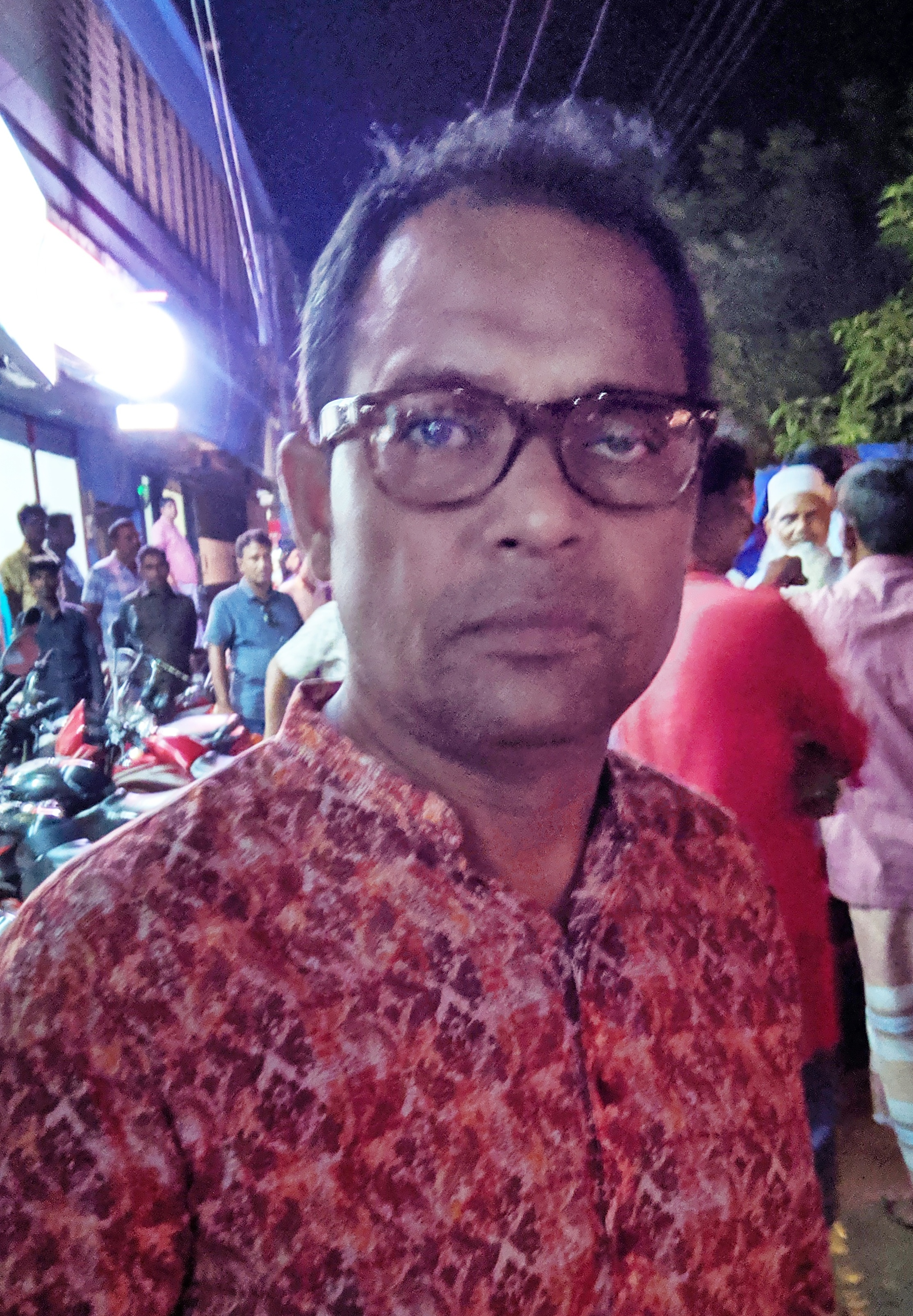
- Aminul at Rohanpur (2019)

Member of Parliament for Chapai Nawabganj-2
- In office 30 January 2019 – 11 December 2022
- Preceded by: Md. Golam Mostofa Biswas
- Succeeded by: Md. Ziaur Rahman

Personal details
- Born: 15 June 1969 (age 56) Chapai Nawabganj, East Pakistan, Pakistan
- Party: Bangladesh Nationalist Party
- Education: HSC
- Occupation: Politician, business

Aminul Islam (born 15 June 1969) is a Bangladesh Nationalist Party politician and a former Jatiya Sangsad member representing the Chapai Nawabganj-2 constituency. He resigned from the position on 11 December 2022.

== Career ==
Islam was elected to parliament from Chapai Nawabganj-2 as a Bangladesh Nationalist Party candidate 30 December 2018.
