= Md. Ziaur Rahman =

Bangladeshi politician

- জিয়াউর রহমান
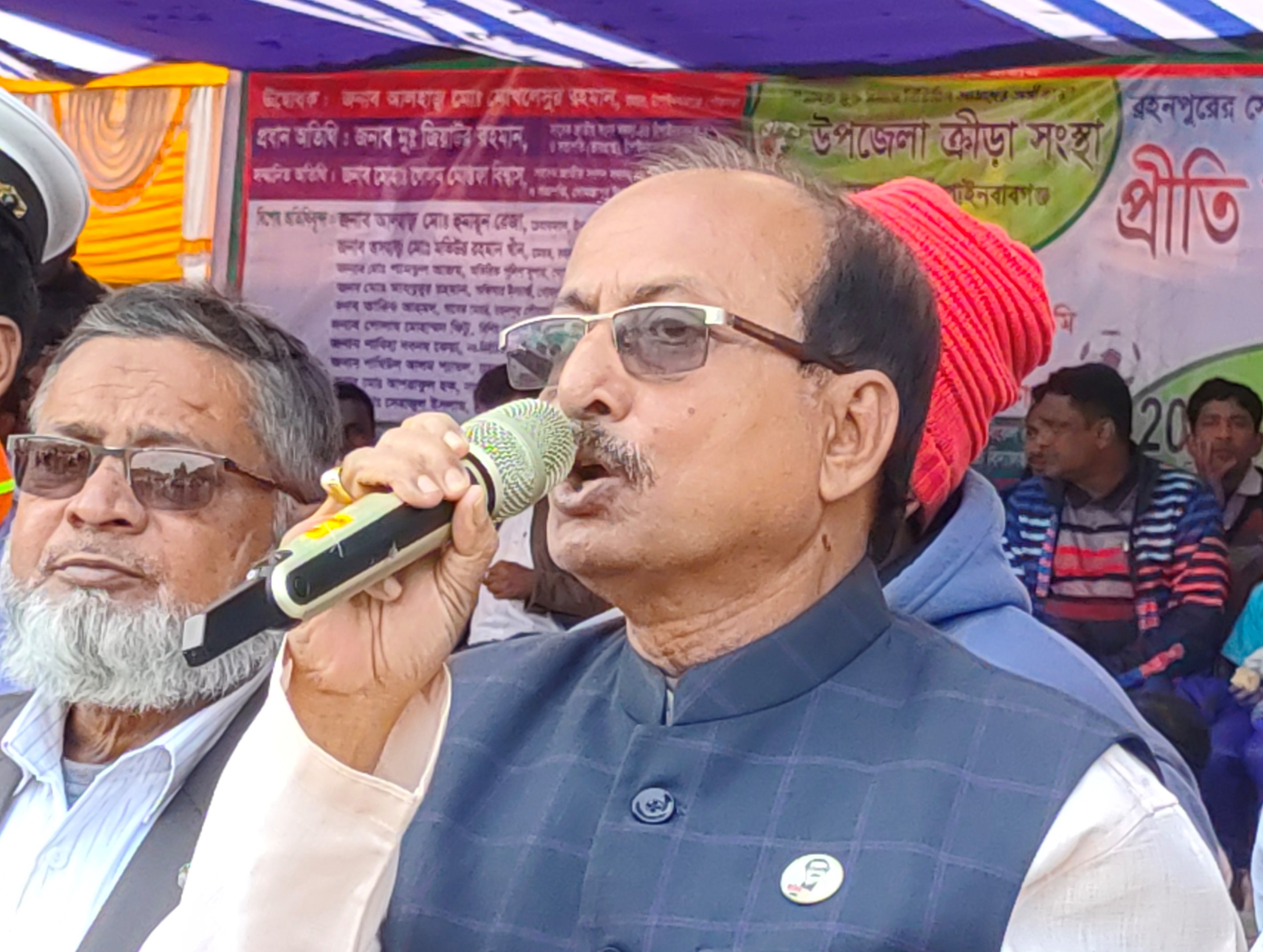

Member of Parliament for Chapai Nawabganj-2
- In office 8 February 2023 – 6 August 2024
- Preceded by: Md. Aminul Islam
- Succeeded by: Mu. Mizanur Rahman
- In office 25 January 2009 – 24 January 2014
- Preceded by: Syed Monjur Hossain
- Succeeded by: Md. Golam Mostofa Biswas

Personal details
- Born: 7 December 1952 (age 73)
- Party: Bangladesh Awami League

Md. Ziaur Rahman (born 7 December 1952) is a Bangladesh Awami League politician and a former Jatiya Sangsad member representing the Chapai Nawabganj-2 constituency.

== Career ==
Zia was elected to parliament from Chapai Nawabganj-2 as a Bangladesh Awami League candidate in 2008. Zia has won the by-elections to Chapainawabganj-2 constituency with 94,928 votes in 2023.
