= Abdus Sattar Bhuiyan =

Bangladeshi politician (1939–2023)

- আবদুস সাত্তার ভূঁইয়া

Member of Parliament for Brahmanbaria-2
- In office 28 January 2019 – 30 September 2023
- Preceded by: Ziaul Haque Mridha
- Succeeded by: Md. Shahjahan Alam Shaju
- In office 15 February 1996 – 9 October 2001
- Preceded by: A. Satter
- Succeeded by: Fazlul Hoque Amini

State Minister of Power, Energy and Mineral Resources
- In office 3 October 2006 – 29 October 2006

State Minister of Land
- In office 6 May 2004 – 3 October 2006

State Minister of Fisheries and Livestock
- In office 22 May 2003 – 6 May 2004

State Minister of Law, Justice and Parliamentary Affairs
- In office 10 October 2001 – 7 April 2003

Member of Parliament for Comilla-1
- In office 2 April 1979 – 24 March 1982
- Preceded by: Mohammad Sayedul Haque
- Succeeded by: Mohammad Mobarak Ali

Personal details
- Born: 16 January 1939 Sarail, Brahmanbaria District, Chittagong Division, Bengal Province, British India
- Died: 30 September 2023 (aged 84) Dhaka, Bangladesh
- Party: Bangladesh Nationalist Party

Abdus Sattar Bhuiyan (16 January 1939 – 30 September 2023) was a Bangladesh Nationalist Party politician and a Jatiya Sangsad member representing the Brahmanbaria-2 constituency. He resigned from the latest position on 11 December 2022 but was re-elected for the same position as an independent candidate in the follow-up by-election on 8 February 2023.

== Early life and family ==
Bhuiyan was born on 16 January 1939 in Paramanandapur Boro Bari, Sarail, then located in the Brahmanbaria subdivision of the Tippera District. His parents were Maqsud Ali Bhuiyan and Rahima Khatun.

== Career ==
Bhuiyan served as the State Minister of Land and the State Minister of Power in the third Khaleda Cabinet. He also served as the State Minister for Fisheries and Livestock in that cabinet.

Bhuiyan served as an adviser to Khaleda Zia. He was re-elected to parliament in a 2023 by-election as an independent candidate.

== Death ==
Abdus Sattar Bhuiyan died on 30 September 2023, at the age of 84.
