= Humayun Kabir (Bangladeshi politician) =

Bangladeshi lawyer and politician (1952–2019)

Member of Parliament for Brahmanbaria-3
- In office 1986–1990
- Preceded by: Constituency Established
- Succeeded by: Haroon Al Rashid

Personal details
- Born: 2 February 1952 Poirtola, Comilla, East Bengal, Pakistan (present-day Poirtola, Brahmanbaria, Bangladesh)
- Died: 27 October 2019 (aged 67) Brahmanbaria General Hospital, Brahmanbaria, Bangladesh
- Party: Bangladesh Awami League
- Other political affiliations: Jatiya Party

Humayun Kabir (2 February 1952 – 27 October 2019) was a Bangladeshi lawyer and politician. He was a deputy minister and MP.

== Early life ==
Kabir was born on 2 February 1952 at Poirtola in Comilla District, Pakistan (present day Brahmanbaria District, Bangladesh). His father's name was Bajlur Rahman and his mother's name was Ukilunnesa. He took part in the Liberation War of Bangladesh.

== Biography ==
Kabir was the general secretary of Brahmanbaria District Awami League. He served as mayor of Brahmanbaria from 1977 to 1982 and 1984 to 1988. He was elected as a member of parliament from Brahmanbaria-3 in 1986 and 1988. He was also appointed deputy minister of Ministry of Health and Family Planning in 1987.

Kabir was married to Nayna Kabir. She is the first female mayoral candidate in the history of Brahmanbaria. She is the first female mayor of Brahmanbaria too.

== Death ==
Kabir died of cardiac arrest on 27 October 2019 at the age of 67.
