= Md. Shahjahan Alam Shaju =

Bangladeshi politician

- মোঃ শাহজাহান আলম সাজু

Member of Jatiya Sangsad
- In office 14 November 2023 – 7 January 2024
- Preceded by: Abdus Sattar Bhuiyan
- Constituency: Brahmanbaria-2

Personal details
- Education: Islamic University, Bangladesh

Shahjahan Alam Saju is a Bangladeshi politician and Jatiya Sangsad member representing the Brahmanbaria-2 constituency. He is the general secretary of Swadhinata Shikshak Parishad.

== Awards and honors ==
Shahjahan Alam Shaju received the International Award 2017 for his contributions to education and social work in Bangladesh.
