= Mahmud Hasan Ripon =

Bangladeshi politician

- মাহমুদ হাসান রিপন

Member of the Bangladesh Parliament for Gaibandha-5
- In office 10 January 2023 – 6 August 2024
- Preceded by: Fazle Rabbi Miah
- Succeeded by: Md. Abdul Wares

Personal details
- Born: 29 November 1978 (age 47)
- Party: Bangladesh Awami League

Mahmud Hasan Ripon (born 29 November 1978) is a Bangladesh Awami League politician and a former Jatiya Sangsad member representing the Gaibandha-5 constituency during 2023–2024.

== Career ==
Ripon was elected the president of the Bangladesh Chhatra League (BCL) during 2006–2011. For the Gaibandha-5 by-election, he was nominated by the Bangladesh Awami League and won the election by defeating the Jatiya Party-backed candidate AHM Golam Shaheed Ranju with a margin of 33,533 votes.
