= Haroon Al Rashid =

Bangladeshi politician (1938/1939–2026)

- হারুন আল রশিদ

Member of Bangladesh Parliament

Personal details
- Born: 1938 or 1939
- Died: 18 June 2026 (aged 87) Dhaka, Bangladesh
- Party: Bangladesh Nationalist Party

Haroon Al Rashid (Bengali: হারুন আল রশিদ; 1938 or 1939 – 18 June 2026) was a Bangladesh Nationalist Party politician and a member of parliament for Brahmanbaria-3.

== Career ==
Rashid was elected to parliament from Brahmanbaria-3 as a Bangladesh Nationalist Party candidate in 1991, 1996, and 2001.

== Death ==
Rashid died on 18 June 2026, at the age of 87.
