= Hero Alom =

Bangladeshi actor and politician

- হিরো আলম
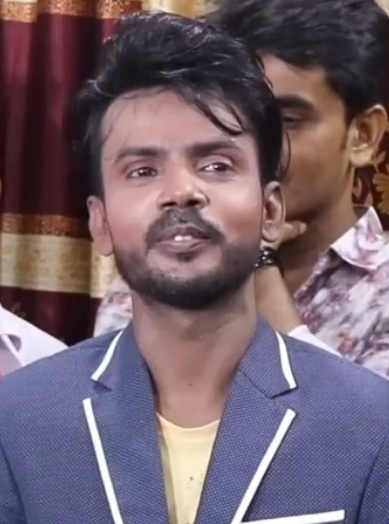
- Born: Ashraful Alom; 20 January 1985 (age 41); Bogura, Bangladesh
- Occupations: Actor, singer, producer, youtuber, politician
- Years active: 2015–present
- Political party: Aam Janata Dol(2026–present)
- Other political affiliations: Jatiya Party (2017–2018) Independent (2018–2023) Bangladesh Congress (2023–2026)

YouTube information
- Channel: Hero Alom OFFICIAL
- Years active: 2018–present
- Subscribers: 1.9 million
- Views: 353.2 million
- Last updated: September 21, 2024

Ashraful Alom (Bengali: আশরাফুল আলম; born 20 January 1985), better known by the stage name Hero Alom (হিরো আলম), is a Bangladeshi media personality, actor, producer, singer, model and politician. He has been working in Bengali short film and music video. He made his debut in 2017 action film Mar Chokka. His YouTube channel has over 1.7 million subscribers.

Alom is best known for his absurdist music videos and meme culture. These videos have made him a target of online trolling and the subject of memes in Bangladesh and other South Asian countries.

== Early life and career ==
Earlier in his life, Alom used to sell Chanachur in a station. Later, Alom had been employed selling CDs and later started a satellite TV connection business. He began making music videos as a hobby. Some of his music videos went viral in 2015, and Alom became a popular target of online trolling and a popular subject of memes in Bangladesh. As of December 2018, Alom has acted in one feature film.

In 2019, a Hindi play based on Alom, directed by NSD-graduate Mahesh Ruprao Ghodeswar, was staged in Ahmedabad and Mumbai.

== Personal life ==
Alom currently lives in Erulia, near Bogra, with his wife, Sadia Akter Sumi, and their children, Alom and Kabir. Alom is involved in charity works and he founded "Hero Alom Foundation" which supports free education for orphans and provides free ambulance, shelter and expenses for homeless people.

== Filmography ==
Key
†	Denotes films that have not yet been released

Year	Films	Role	Notes	Ref.
2017	Mar Chokka	Hero Alom	Debut Film	
2020	Shahoshi Hero Alom	Hero Alom		
2023	Tokai	Tokai / Hero Alom	Also producer and singer	
2024	Badsha: The King	Hero Alom	Also producer	
TBA	Shyambazar †	Hero Alom	Filming	
TBA	Biju The Hero †	TBA	Debut Hindi Film	
TBA	Pakhi The Virus †	TBA	Unreleased; Indian Bengali film	

=== Short films ===
Year	Films	Role	Notes
2018	Protibadi Hero Alom	Hero Alom	
2018	Mati		
2018	Tarzan The Hero Alam	Tarzan	
2019	Alom The Power	Hero Alom	
2019	Badam Bhalobasha		
2019	Bidhobar Shanshar		
2019	Bhaiyer Bhalobasha		
2020	Kipta	Hero Alom	
2020	Hinsro Bagh		
2020	Palta Jobab		
2020	Barishailla Bou		
2020	Joggota		
2021	Hero Ekhon Zero		
2021	Ma Boro Na Bou Boro		
2021	Dhorshito Bon		
2021	Bashir Shure Pori Pagol		
2021	Motu Patlur Prem	Patlu	
2021	Alom Dalal	Alom Dalal	
2021	Mayer Proti Bhalobasha		

== Political activities ==
=== 2018 ===
In 2018 Alom decided to contest in 2018 Bangladeshi general election and he bought his candidature form for Bogra-4 constituency buying a Jatiya Party (E) nomination paper ahead of the 11th national elections, but Jatiya Party denied him nomination. Later, he sought his candidacy as an independent candidate. On 10 December High Court instructed Bangladesh Election Commission to accept his candidature form as the latter authority denied his candidature earlier and Alom contested in the election as an independent candidate. His candidacy drew so much media attention that, in 2018, he became the 2nd Bangladeshi only behind Khaleda Zia to be in the top 10 in the category of people in 2018 google search trend in Bangladesh. Eventually he lost in the election getting only 638 votes in his name and BNP candidate Mosharraf Hossain won the seat of that constituency.

=== 2023 ===
He contested in the bypolls to both Bogra-6 and Bogra-4 as an independent, and lost Bogra-4 by only 834 votes.

On July 17, 2023, Alom was assaulted by political opponents near a polling center at the Banani Bidyaniketan School and College. Alom stood as an independent candidate in the ongoing Dhaka-17 elections. The incident occurred at around 3:20 p.m. while Alom was visiting the polling center. According to reports, Alom was taking photos with his fans on the playground of the school when he was approached by a group of people who told him that it was not a place to shoot TikTok videos. The group then began to physically assault Alom, dragging him out of the building after he had entered the corridor. Alom was able to escape in a car. An officer at the scene said that Alom had been accompanied by around 50–60 people, and that law enforcement personnel had ejected them from the polling center to maintain order. The officer also said that the assault on the independent candidate took place outside the polling center premises.

The officer added that the police would collect video footage of the incident and investigate. He said that those responsible for the assault would be brought to justice.

The United Nations high commission of Bangladesh showed their concerns over the actions and requested for his protection.

== Legal issues ==
=== 2019 ===
Alom was arrested in March 2019 for allegedly assaulting his wife for dowry. Alom had earlier assaulted her when she had protested against his "second marriage", according to Sumi. Alom came home to Erulia village on the outskirts of the town on Monday night after two months and spoke to a woman on mobile phone for three hours, his wife said. According Sumi's father Saiful Alam, he rescued Sumi from Alom's home on Tuesday night and took her to the hospital. In the police complaint, he alleged Alom also demanded Tk 200,000 in dowry from him.

=== 2022 ===
He was arrested again on August 6, 2022 by Dhaka Police for exploiting and degrading old classical Bengali songs. He said, "The police picked me up at 6 am and kept me there for eight hours. They asked me why I sing Rabindra and Nazrul songs". He was mainly arrested for making a music video from Rabindranath Tagore's song changing its original tone and lyrics. In response, Dhaka's chief detective Harun-or-Rashid said Alom was arrested for wearing the police uniform in his videos without authority permission. The chief detective added that they had also received several complaints against Alom for his take on old classical songs. "We received many complaints against him. (He) totally changed the (traditional) style (of singing)... He assured us that he won’t repeat this", he said.

=== 2026 ===
On 19 February, Alom was arrested following allegations of rape and abuses on promise of fake marriage and of casting the complainant as a film heroine.
