= Syed Monjur Hossain =

Bangladeshi politician

- সৈয়দ মঞ্জুর হোসেন

Member of Bangladesh Parliament
- In office 1st term
- In office 1979–1982
- Preceded by: Khalid Ali Mia
- Succeeded by: Mim Obaidullah
- In office 2nd-6th term
- In office 1988–2006
- Preceded by: Mim Obaidullah
- Succeeded by: Md. Ziaur Rahman

Personal details
- Party: Bangladesh Nationalist Party

Syed Monjur Hossain is a Bangladesh Nationalist Party politician and a former member of parliament for Chapai Nawabganj-2.

== Career ==
Hossain was elected to parliament from Chapai Nawabganj-2 as a Bangladesh Nationalist Party candidate in 1979, 1988, 1991, 1996, and 2001.
