= Md. Ziaul Haque Mridha =

Bangladeshi politician

Ziaul Hoque Mridha

Member of Parliament (Bangladesh)
- In office 2008–2018
- Preceded by: Fazlul Haque Amini
- Succeeded by: Ukil Abdul Sattar Bhuiyan
- Constituency: Brahmanbaria-2

Md. Ziaul Haque Mridha (Bengali: মোঃ জিয়াউল হক মৃধা) is a Jatiya Party politician and the former Member of Parliament from Brahmanbaria-2.

== Early life ==
Mridha was born on 1 January 1952. He has a B.A. and a law degree.

== Career ==
Mridha was elected to parliament in 2008 for the Brahmanbaria-2 constituency as a Jatiya Party candidate. In the 2014 Bangladeshi general election, Sheuly Azad, the Awami League nominee for Brahmanbaria-2, withdrew on instructions from party leader Sheikh Hasina, so as to support the party's coalition partner, the Jatiya Party. Mrida was re-elected on 5 January 2014. He did not receive the nomination for the 2018 election and contested it as an independent candidate.
