= Mim Obaidullah =

Bangladeshi politician

- মীম ওবায়দুল্লাহ

Member of Parliament from Chapai Nawabganj-2
- In office 1986–1987
- Preceded by: Syed Monjur Hossain
- Succeeded by: Syed Monjur Hossain

Personal details
- Born: 1932 Timirpura, Malda district, Bengal Presidency, British Raj
- Died: 30 September 2016 (aged 83–84) Rajshahi Medical College Hospital
- Citizenship: British Raj (up to 1947); Pakistan (before 1971); Bangladesh
- Party: Bangladesh Jamaat-e-Islami

Mim Obaidullah (1932–2016) was a Bangladeshi politician affiliated with the Bangladesh Jamaat-e-Islami who served the Chapai Nawabganj-2 constituency as a member of the Jatiya Sangsad from 1986 to 1987.

== Early life and education ==
Mim Obaidullah was born in 1933 in Timirpura village of Malda district, India to Maulana Abbas Ali and Dil Afroza Begum. He passed his higher secondary examination from Bihar Shyamapur Madamrasa and in 1958 obtained his final certificate in Dars-i Nizami from Patna Mazharul Uloom. He became a member of Jamaat-e-Islami Hind. He left India in 1962 and settled in Rahanpura village of Chapai Nawabganj, East Pakistan. There he joined Jamaat-e-Islami Pakistan in 1964.

== Career ==
Mim Obaidullah was elected to parliament from Chapai Nawabganj-2 as a Bangladesh Jamaat-e-Islami candidate in 1986. In 1987, he resigned from the parliament.

== Death ==
Mim Obaidullah died on 30 September 2016 in Rajshahi Medical College Hospital.
