= Yeasin Ali =

Bangladeshi politician

Member of Jatiyo Sangshad
- In office 9 January 2014 – 7 January 2019
- Constituency: Thakurgaon-3

Personal details
- Born: 1 July 1961 (age 65)
- Party: Workers Party of Bangladesh

Yeasin Ali (born 1 July 1961) is a Bangladeshi politician. A university professor, he has served as a member of the Jatiyo Sangshad since 2014, representing Thakurgaon-3 for the Workers Party of Bangladesh.
