= Bijoynagar Upazila =

Bijoynagar বিজয়নগর
- Upazila
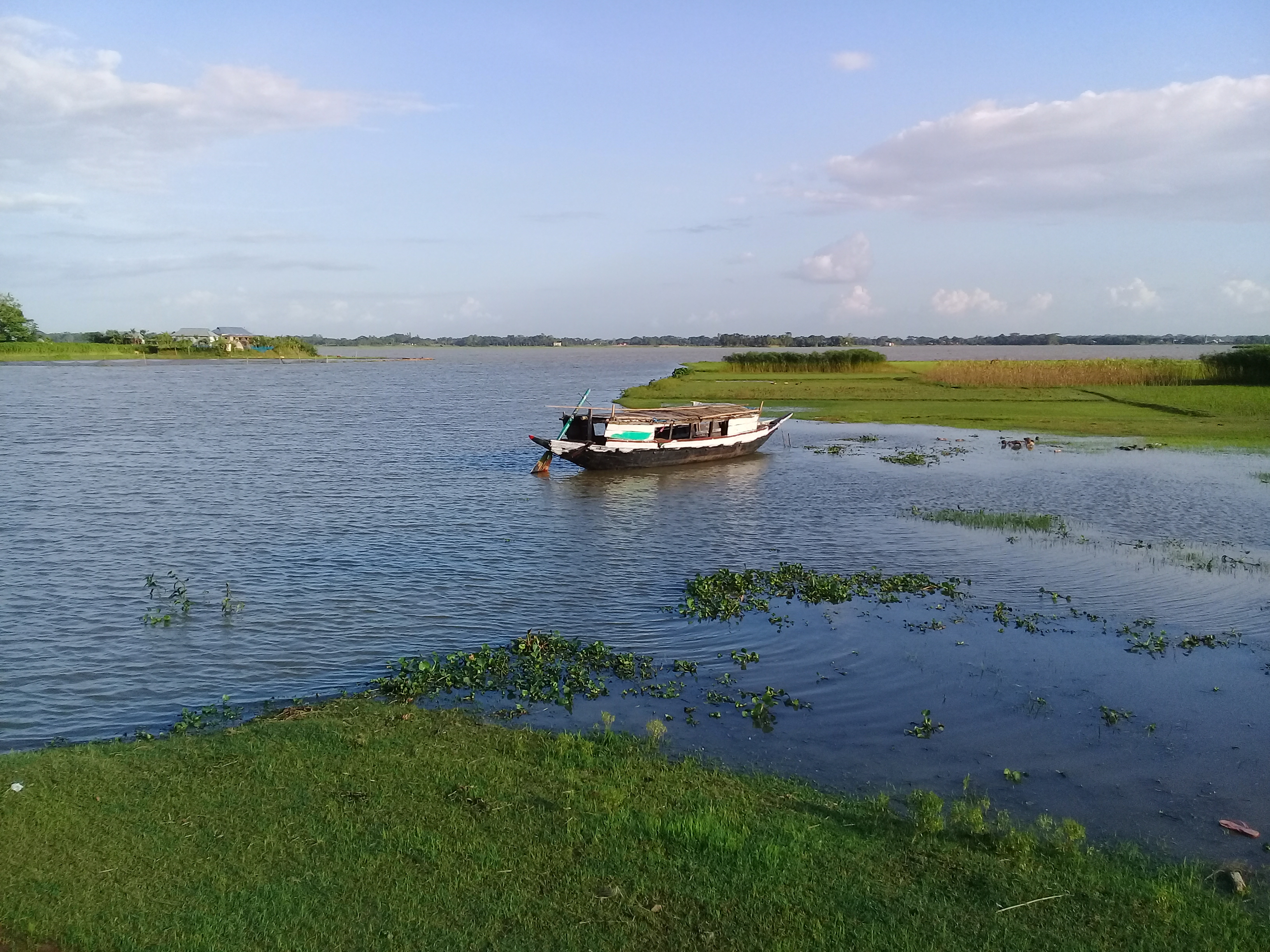
- View of Hajipur village

- Coordinates: 24°1.3′N 91°16.8′E
- Country: Bangladesh
- Division: Chittagong
- District: Brahmanbaria

Area
  - Total: 221.17 km^{2} (85.39 sq mi)

Population (2022)
  - Total: 290,431
  - Density: 1,313.2/km^{2} (3,401.1/sq mi)
- Time zone: UTC+6 (BST)
- Postal code: 3404
- Website: bijoynagar.brahmanbaria.gov.bd

Bijoynagar Upazila mauza geocode map

Bijoynagar (Bengali: বিজয়নগর) is an upazila of Brahmanbaria District in the Division of Chittagong, Bangladesh.

== Geography ==
Bijoynagar has 48,617 households and a total area of 221.17 km^{2} (85 sq mi).

== History ==
Previously it was a part of Tripura District. In 1618 CE during the reign of Jahangir, his commander in chief Daud Khan occupied this area from the king of Tripura. This locality was renamed as Daudpur Pargana after his name. After the struggle he (Daud Khan) settled here as administrative lord. This pargana was annexed with the pargana Jalalpur (Mymensingh). The British came into Bengal as Dewan (Revenue collector) in 1765 C.E. They created many districts for their administrative purposes. Again they established Tripura as District in 1790. Daudpur Pargana was also a part of Mymensingh. In 1860, the government established Brahmanbaria as sub-division. Daudpur, Sarail, Bejura and Haripur were separated from Mymensingh and submitted to Brahmanbaria. Ershad government promoted Brahmanbaria as Zilla in 1984 from sub-Division (Biplob, 16.4.2017).

== Demographics ==
Religions in Bijoynagar Upazila (2022)
| Religion | Percent |
| Islam | 92.81% |
| Hinduism | 7.18% |
| Other or not stated | 0.01% |

According to the 2022 Bangladeshi census, Bijoynagar Upazila had 61,918 households and a population of 290,431. 12.01% of the population were under 5 years of age. Bijoynagar had a literacy rate (age 7 and over) of 71.79%: 71.56% for males and 71.98% for females, and a sex ratio of 87.96 males for every 100 females. 13,389 (4.61%) lived in urban areas.

According to the 2011 Census of Bangladesh, Bijoynagar Upazila had 48,617 households and a population of 257,247. 76,565 (29.76%) were under 10 years of age. Bijoynagar had a literacy rate (age 7 and over) of 53.41%, compared to the national average of 51.8%, and a sex ratio of 1048 females per 1000 males. 7,619 (2.96%) lived in urban areas.

== Administration ==
Bijoynagar Upazila is divided into ten union parishads: Bhudanty, Bishupor, Chandura, Char Islampur, Champaknagar, Harashpur, Ichhapur, Paharpur, Pattan, and Singerbil. The union parishads are subdivided into 164 mauzas and 225 villages.
