= Emdadul Haque =

Bangladeshi politician

Member of Parliament

Personal details
- Party: Bangladesh Awami League

Emdadul Haque (also spelled Imdadul Haque}) is a Bangladeshi Awami League politician and former member of parliament for Thakurgaon-3.

== Career ==
Haque was elected to parliament for Thakurgaon-3 as a candidate of the Bangladesh Awami League in June 1996. He lost in the subsequent election to Hafiz Uddin Ahmed in 2001. He was nominated for the 2018 election by Bangladesh Awami League from Thakurgaon-3. He is the senior vice-president of the Bangladesh Awami League Thakurgaon District unit.
