= Dhaka-20 =

Constituency of Bangladesh's Jatiya Sangsad

Coordinates: 23.92°N 90.21°E

- Constituency for the Jatiya Sangsad
- District: Dhaka District
- Division: Dhaka Division
- Electorate: 376,639 (2026)

Current constituency
- Created: 1973 (Original); 2008 (Redistricted)
- Party: Bangladesh Nationalist Party
- Member: Md Tamiz Uddin
- ← 192 Dhaka-19 194 Gazipur-1 →

Dhaka-20 is a constituency represented in the Jatiya Sangsad (National Parliament) of Bangladesh since 2026 by Md Tamiz Uddin of the Bangladesh Nationalist Party.

== Boundaries ==
The constituency encompasses Dhamrai Upazila.

== History ==
The constituency was created when, ahead of the 2008 general election, the Election Commission redrew constituency boundaries to reflect population changes revealed by the 2001 Bangladesh census. At the previous general election, in 2001, Dhamrai Upazila corresponded to constituency Dhaka-13. The 2008 redistricting added 7 new seats to Dhaka District, increasing the number of constituencies in the district from 13 to 20. One of the new seats usurped the name Dhaka-13, and the former constituency of that name became Dhaka-20.

== Members of Parliament ==
Election	Member	Party
1973	Tajuddin Ahmad	Awami League
1979	Dewan Mohammad Idris	Bangladesh Nationalist Party
Major Boundary Changes
2008	Benzir Ahmed	Awami League
2014	M. A. Maleque	Awami League
2018	Benzir Ahmed	Awami League
2024	Benzir Ahmed	Awami League
2026	Md Tamiz Uddin	Bangladesh Nationalist Party

== Elections ==
=== Elections in the 2020s ===
General election 2026: Dhaka-20
Party	Candidate	Votes	%	±%
BNP	Md Tamiz Uddin	160,428		
NCP	Nabila Tasnid	56,343		
BKM	Md. Ashraf Ali			
JP(E)	Ahsan Khan			
Majority		104,085		
Turnout				
Registered electors		376,639		
BNP gain from AL				

Benzir Ahmed was nominated by Awami League in the 12th National Parliament election held on 7 January 2024. He got 83,708 thousand votes defeating his nearest rival independent candidate Mohaddesh Hossain.

Benazir Ahmed was nominated by the Awami League in the 12th National Parliament election held on January 7, 2024. She defeated her nearest rival, independent candidate Mohaddes Hossain, by getting 83,708 votes.

=== Elections in the 2010s ===
General Election 2018: Dhaka-20
Party	Candidate	Votes	%	±%
AL	Benzir Ahmed	259,788	96.84	N/A
IAB	Md Abdul Mannan	7,268	2.71	N/A
JP(E)	Khan Mohammad Israfil	1,198	0.45	N/A
Majority		252,520	94.11	
Turnout		268,254	83.78	
Registered electors		320,223		
AL hold				

M. A. Maleque was elected unopposed in the 2014 general election after opposition parties withdrew their candidacies in a boycott of the election.

=== Elections in the 2000s ===
General Election 2008: Dhaka-20
Party	Candidate	Votes	%	±%
AL	Benzir Ahmed	133,437	58.7	N/A
BNP	Ziaur Rahman Khan	93,177	41.0	N/A
JSD	M. A. Mannan	521	0.2	N/A
Majority		40,260	17.7	N/A
Turnout		227,135	88.5	N/A
AL win (new seat)				

== See also ==
- Dhaka-19
