= Md Tamiz Uddin =

Bangladeshi politician

- মোঃ তমিজ উদ্দিন

Member of the Bangladesh Parliament for Dhaka-20
- Incumbent
- Assumed office 17 February 2026
- Preceded by: Benzir Ahmed

Personal details
- Party: Bangladesh Nationalist Party

Md. Tamiz Uddin is a Bangladesh Nationalist Party (BNP) politician and elected member of parliament from Dhaka-20.

== Career ==
Md Tamiz Uddin is the president of the Dhamrai Upazila unit of the BNP, a three-term upazila chairman, and a National Executive Committee member of the BNP.

Uddin won the 2026 Bangladeshi general election contesting at the Dhaka-20 constituency, securing 160,428 votes, while his nearest opponent, National Citizen Party candidate Nabila Tasnid, got 56,343 votes.
