= Virendra Mohan Dar =

Indian Zamindar and Businessman

Maharaja Virendra Mohan Dar Bahadur
- Hickey portrait c. 1816

1st Maharaja of Dar Raj
- In office 1771–1821
- Monarchs: Durrani (1758–1773); Kanhaiya Misl (1774–1789); British Raj (1790–1821)
- Preceded by: Office established
- Succeeded by: Raja Mukund Mohan Dar

Personal details
- Born: September 14, 1758 Dar, Akhnoor, Jammu
- Died: February 3, 1821 (aged 62) Dhamrai Upazila, Dhaka
- Parent: Ramhari Dar (father)
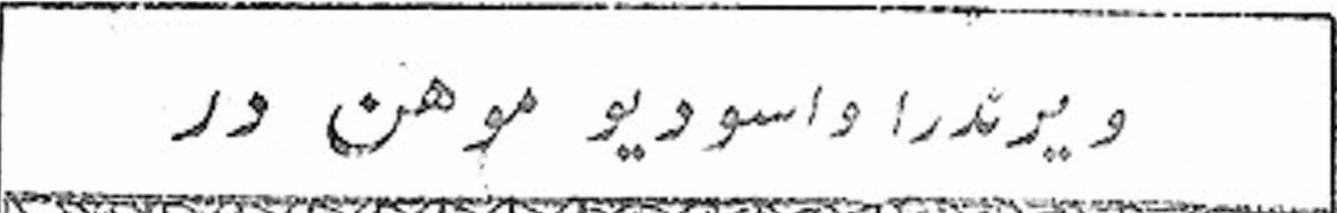
- Signature

Maharaja Virendra Vasudev Mohan Dar Bahadur (Persian: ویرِندرا واسودِو موهان دار) (14 September 1758 – 3 February 1821), also known as Raja Virendra Mohan Dar or The Saffron King, was a Kashmiri Pandit jagirdar and the King of 16 Dar estates in Jammu (Note: The 11,000 acre northern frontier estates centered around Akhnoor along the Chenab River included Dar, Ambaran, Pamberwan, Maira, Garkhal, Sohal, Brui alongside surrounding village tracts and mouzas- Jia Pota, Jourian, Pargwal, Bhalwal, Gharota, Sui, Dauri, Malpur along with foothill tracts extending towards Khouri and Bhimber.) from 1771 until the collapse of the royal family in 1789 and 19 Dar estates in Bangladesh and West Bengal (Note: The eastern 45,000 acre holdings in the Dacca District were governed from Rajrajeshwar (Char Talibari) and Nannar Rajbari, encompassing Dhamrai, Rowail, Sharifbagh, Demra, Ashulia, Jalsin, Sambha, Suapur, Amta, and regional border tracts in Kaliganj, Harirampur, Manikganj, Saturia, and Ghior.) until his death in 1821.

== Early life and education ==
Virendra Mohan Dar was born on 14 September 1758, in Akhnoor, Kashmir. He completed his education, in Persian, Sanskrit, English and Mathematics under kashmiri pandits such as Pt. Madhusudan Kaul.

== Accession ==
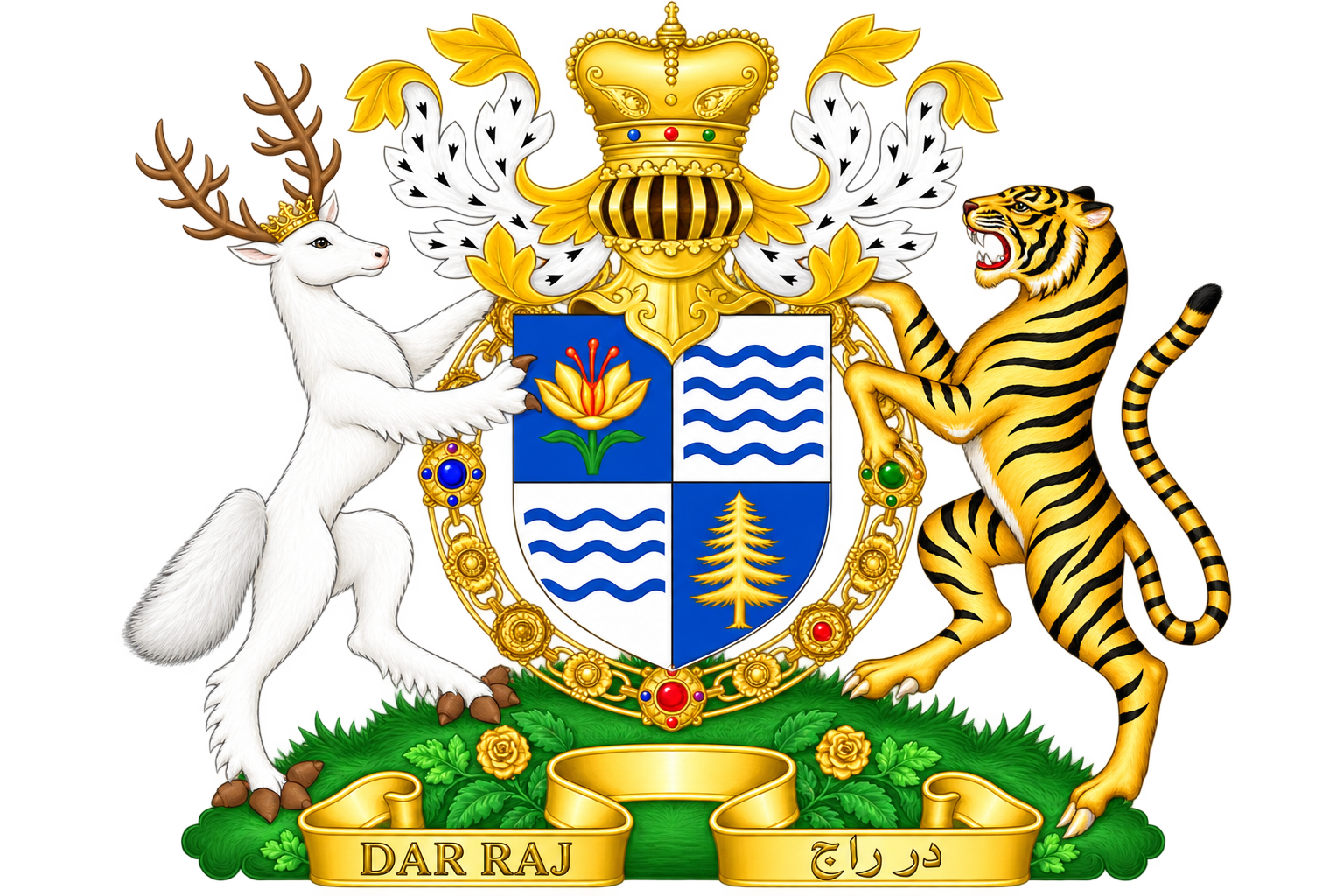
Coat of Arms of the King of the House

During the reign of Ahmad Shah Durrani, he was formally conferred the title of Maharaja and was coronated in 1771. His role is considered significant in the political and social history of Kashmir. The death of Ahmed Shah Durrani in 1772 resulted in the decline of the Durrani Empire due to which the Dar Raj eventually lost power in Akhnoor and the Cashmere Valley, hence they shifted to Bengal (Now Bangladesh).

Virendra Mohan Dar was titled the "Saffron King" by merchants for his regulation and expansion of the saffron trade in his 11,000-acre Akhnoor domain. He institutionalized cultivation and implemented a "Charter of Fair Commerce" to prevent product adulteration and maintain market integrity.

=== Virendra Royal Succession Charter ===
Dar established a formal constitutional code known as The Virendra Royal Succession Charter (or the Virendra Royal Succession Charter of the House of Dar). Promulgated around 1773, the document was intended to provide legal clarity for the inheritance of the Dar Raj and was engrossed in both Sanskrit and Persian. The Charter consists of 18 articles that define the hereditary rights and administrative symbols of the dynasty.

Articles of the Virendra Royal Succession Charter:

- Article I: Establishes the sovereignty of the Dar Raj as hereditary and non-elective.
- Article II: Mandates agnatic primogeniture, stating the eldest legitimate son succeeds to the throne.
- Article III: Reserves the title of Yuvraj exclusively for the eldest legitimate son during his father's lifetime.
- Article IV: Assigns the title of Rajkumar to younger legitimate sons.
- Article V: Grants the title of Rajkumari (Princess) to legitimate daughters for their lifetime.
- Article VI: Stipulates that legitimate sons and their lines always take precedence over female lines.
- Article VII: Provides for succession in the absence of sons, moving first to the eldest son of the eldest daughter; if no male descendants exist in the female line, the eldest surviving daughter may ascend as Maharani Regnant.
- Article VIII: Details that the eldest son of a Maharani Regnant succeeds as Maharaja.
- Article IX: Clarifies the order of succession through collateral female branches if the primary female line fails to produce a male heir.
- Article X: Directs succession to the nearest legitimate male descendant of the senior collateral branch if the reigning Maharaja has no direct descendants.
- Article XI: Explicitly prohibits adoption from creating any dynastic rights to the throne, titles, or royal estates.
- Article XII: Excludes children born outside of a lawful marriage from hereditary claims.
- Article XIII: States that marriage into the royal family does not confer independent sovereignty; a spouse does not become a sovereign by right of marriage.
- Article XIV: Defines the title and precedence of the Maharani Consort (also Queen Consort), who has no sovereign authority unless appointed as a Regent.
- Article XV: Declares the Crown, titles, and supreme authority one and indivisible, prohibiting the partitioning of the Raj among multiple heirs.
- Article XVI: Establishes the permanence of the Charter, requiring unanimous consent from the Royal Council and senior family members for any alterations.
- Article XVII: Mandates that each sovereign assume a personal Royal Crest and Cipher (e.g., V I, V II) to be used on the Great Seal and official instruments.

== Shift to Bengal ==
Virendra Mohan constructed the Dhar Rajbari at Char Talibari, in the Rajrajeshwar area of Bengal (Now Bangladesh), at a cost of 2 million rupees. Later, due to severe erosion by the Padma River, the palace was completely destroyed. He then built the 250 room Dhar Zamindar Palace at Jalsin, Nannar Village in Dhamrai at a cost of 3 million rupees, which is also known as Nannar Rajbari. The House of Dar under The Maharaja, spanned over 40,000 acres of land across Bangladesh and Jammu. In 1813, the title of Bahadur was formally conferred upon Virendra Mohan Dar by Nawab Zain-ud-Din Ali Khan of Murshidabad, with the official sanction of the British Governor-General, Lord Minto I, in recognition of his significant contributions to land expansion, the construction of irrigation works, and consistent revenue payments to the East India Company. By the end of 1820 he established 3 palaces in the Dhamrai Upazila.

Territories of Dar Raj in Dhamrai Upazila, Bangladesh Territories under the Dar Raj Disputed territories under the Dar Raj

== Residences ==
Virendra Mohan Dar established four palaces in the Dhamrai Upazila after shifting to Bengal

Rowail Zamindar Palace, established between 1802 and 1805 by Dar, which was later sold to the Ray brothers- Kamud and Ramendra.

Jalsin Palace (Also Uma Kutir or Uma Rajbari) was established by Dar in 1804. In 1966, it was renamed as Uma Kutir by Raja Chittajit Mohan Dhar, on his youngest daughter- Princess Uma.

Side view of the Jalsin Palace

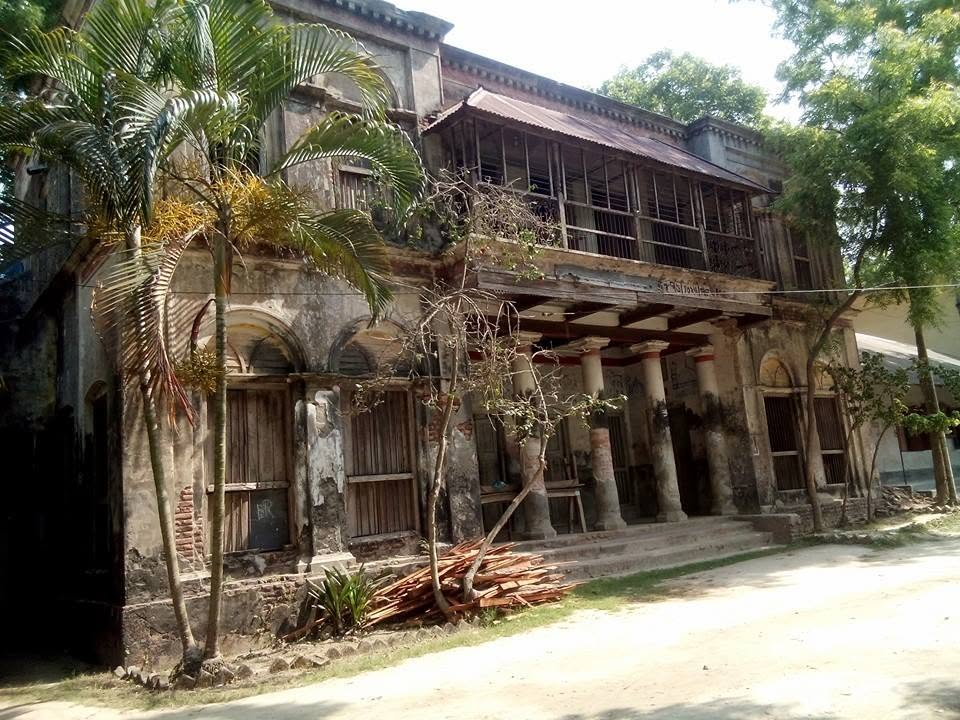
The Dhar Zamindar Bari, established in 1802. It was partially demolished in 1919 by Mohini Mohan Dhar and converted to Elokeshi High School, Jalsin.

Wall and Entrance of the Jalsin Palace

A view of the Rowail Zamindar Palace

The palace pond 'Virendra Sagar' located opposite to the Dhar Zamindar Palace, Jalsin

== Death and legacy ==
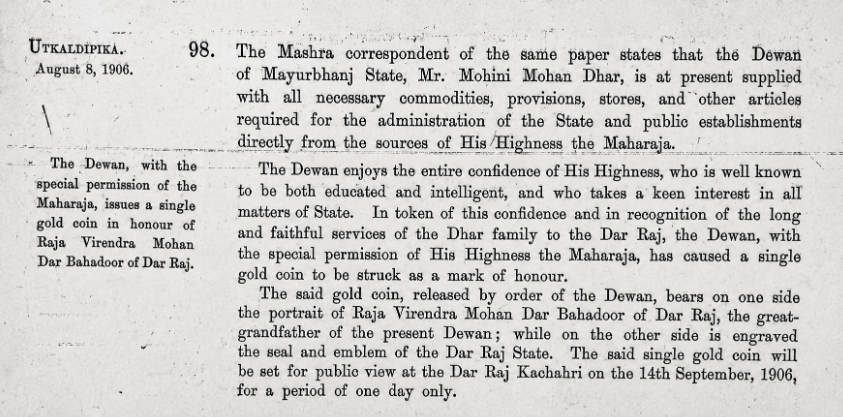
Utkala Dipika. 8 August 1906. p. 98.

Virendra Mohan Dar is mentioned in various historical texts and records, where he is identified as one of the influential local rulers of Kashmir during the Durrani period. In the year 1816, his son commissioned a portrait of him by Thomas Hickey. In August 1906, the Maharaja of Mayurbhanj State authorized the striking of a unique, ceremonial gold coin to posthumously honor the long-standing political and administrative legacy of Raja Virendra Mohan Dar, on the request of the Dewan- Mohini Mohan Dhar. The commemorative coin featured a portrait of Dar on one side and the official emblem of the Dar Raj State on the reverse. It was placed on public display at the Dar Raj Kachahri on September 14, 1906. He died in 1821 of cancer. His son, Raja Mukund Mohan Dar, was coronated the following year.

== Bibliography ==
- Basu, Gopi Nath (1919-04-04). Dice Esq., M.R. (ed.). LETTERS AND PAMPHLETS OF RAJA VIRENDRAMOHAN. Thacker, Spink, & Co.
- Sen, P. K.; Fitzroy, Edward; Harrington, Reginald (1941). Virendra Mohan Dar: A Biography. Calcutta: Metcuff Printing Works.
- Pal, Gurnindra (1908). রাজা বীরেন্দ্র মোহন দার এর জীবনচরিত্র [Raja Virendra Mohan Dar's Biography] (in Bengali) (1st incomplete serialization ed.). 5 Shib Narayan Das Lane / 61–62 Bowbazar, Calcutta, Bengal Presidency, British India: Kuntaline Press.
