= Dewan Mohammad Idris =

Bangladeshi politician

Member of Parliament Dhaka-20
- In office 18 February 1979 – 12 February 1982

Personal details
- Born: March 1920 Dhaka
- Died: 10 February 1990 Dhaka
- Political party: Bangladesh Nationalist Party

Dewan Mohammad Idris (March 1920 – 10 February 1990) (Bengali: দেওয়ান মোহাম্মদ ইদ্রিস) was a Bangladesh Nationalist Party politician and a former member of parliament for Dhaka-20.

== Education ==
Dewan Mohammad Idris started his education at Ashulia Primary School and entered the fifth grade at Jirabo Primary School. Dhamrai Hardinge High School and College established in 1914 was admitted in the sixth standard. Later passed matriculation from Adharchandra High School, Savar. He studied at Jagannath University, Dhaka.

== Career ==
Dewan Mohammad Idris served as chairman of Ashulia Union and Yarpur Union in what is now Savar Upazila for 45 years, from 1943 to 1988.

In 1965, he participated in the provincial assembly elections from Savar-Dhamrai constituency. In 1969, he led with former minister Captain Abdul Halim to repeal the anti-farmer sunset law (the government would take ownership of land if rent was not paid within a specified time). He participated in the provincial assembly elections in 1970 as a candidate for Nap Mozaffar, contesting from the Savar seat with the hut symbol.

Dewan Mohammad Idris conducted and trained camps for freedom fighters in Jirabo and Ashulia in 1971.

In the first parliamentary election of 1973, he contested as the candidate of Nap Mozaffar in the first parliamentary election of Bangladesh in the Savar constituency.

Idris was elected to parliament from Dhaka-20 as a Bangladesh Nationalist Party candidate in 1979.

== Death and legacy ==
Dewan Mohammad Idris died of a heart attack on 10 February 1990 at Jirabo village of Ashulia police station in Savar upazila.

Idris's son, Dr Dewan Md. Salauddin, was elected to parliament from Dhaka-12 in 1996 and 2001 as a candidate of the Bangladesh Nationalist Party. After the election commission redrew constituency boundaries to reflect population changes, he contested the 2018 general election from Dhaka-19.
