= Nationalist Democratic Movement (Bangladesh) =

Political Party in Bangladesh

National Democratic Movement জাতীয়তাবাদী গণতান্ত্রিক আন্দোলন
- Abbreviation: NDM
- Chairperson: Rashna Imam
- Secretary-General: Mohammad Mominul Amin
- Founder: Bobby Hajjaj
- Founded: 24 April 2017; 9 years ago
- Student wing: Student Movement - NDM
- Youth wing: Youth Movement - NDM
- Political position: Center
- National affiliation: Gano Oikya
- Bangladesh Parliament: 0 / 350

Election symbol
- Lion

Party flag
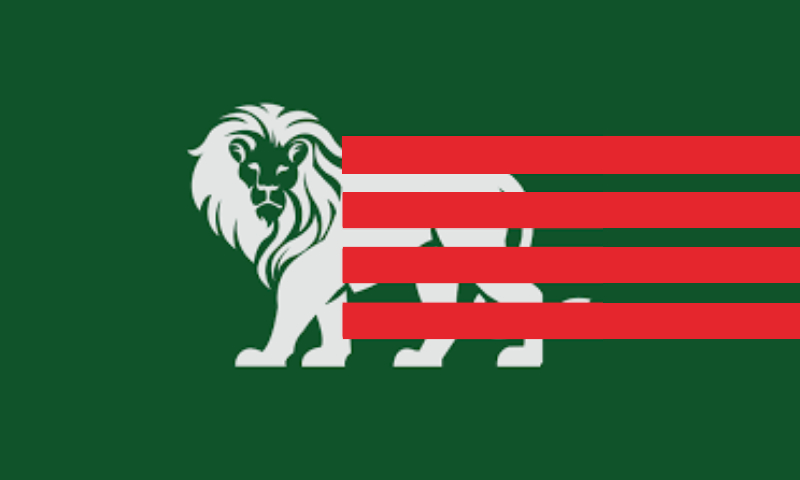

The Nationalist Democratic Movement (NDM) (Bengali: জাতীয়তাবাদী গণতান্ত্রিক আন্দোলন- এনডিএম) is a political party in Bangladesh. It was officially launched on 24 April 2017. It identifies as centrist. The party has been registered as a political party by the Election Commission of Bangladesh. The symbol of the party is a Lion.

== History ==
The Nationalist Democratic Movement has its origins in the ShopnerDesh movement started by party founder and chairman, Bobby Hajjaj. The erosion of political values, centralization of party power, and the abeyance of democratic norms, were reasons stated by party leaders for their formation of the party. Party Chairman along with other current members of the NDM's National Executive Committee started work on launching the party at a national scale in midyear 2016 and on 24 April 2017, they officially launched the party. According to party leadership, NDM had the biggest launch of any political party in Bangladesh with representatives from over thirty districts convening for the official launch in Dhaka.

== Elections ==
The party sought registration from the Election Commission of Bangladesh to participate in the 2018 Bangladeshi general election, but did not receive it. So the NDM contested the election in alliance with the Muslim League. The party has got registration from the Election Commission of Bangladesh on 30 January 2019. The symbol of the party is a lion.
