= Moosa Bin Shamsher =

Bangladeshi businessman (born 1946)

- মূসা বিন শমসের
- Born: Abu Daud Muhammad Musa; 15 October 1945 (age 81); Faridpur, Bengal Presidency, British India
- Other name: Prince Moosa
- Occupation: CEO of DATCO Group
- Spouse: Kaniz Fatema Chowdhury
- Children: 3 including Bobby Hajjaj
- Relatives: Sheikh Fazle Fahim (son-in-law); Chowdhury family of Dulai (in-laws)

Abu Daud Muhammad Moosa (Bengali: আবূ দাঊদ মোহাম্মদ মূসা; born 15 October 1945), better known as Moosa Bin Shamsher (Bengali: মূসা বিন শমসের), is a Bangladeshi businessman and self-proclaimed arms dealer, and the CEO of DATCO Group, a labour export company.

== Early life and education ==
Abu Daud Muhammad Moosa was born on 15 October 1945 to a middle-class Bengali family of Muslim Mullahs in the village of Qazikanda in Faridpur District, Bengal Presidency. He was the third son in a family of four sons and two daughters. His father, Shamsher Ali Mollah, graduated from the University of Calcutta and was an education officer and civil servant for the British Raj.

When Moosa was a school student, he participated in a school debate competition and received the Best Orator award from President Ayub Khan. In 1988, Moosa was awarded a PhD in economics. There are conflicting reports of which institution awarded his PhD. The schools named are Pacific Western University in Hawaii, California Miramar University (formerly Pacific Western University, California), and California State University.

== Business ==
Moosa founded DATCO Group, a manpower recruitment firm. Moosa claims to be an international arms dealer who made billions of dollars trading arms in the 1970s and 1980s. He claims that he accumulated $10 billion from trading in tanks, fighter jets, ICBMs, and power brokerages. He also claimed that he has around $7 million in Swiss bank accounts that have been frozen due to irregular transactions. Moosa stated in 2019 that he wanted to bring over €20 billion to Bangladesh, including money that he earned doing business with Adnan Khashoggi. Moosa claims to have made a large amount of his fortune from the Iran–Iraq War. However, a government probe against him found that all his claims were baseless as Moosa couldn't provide any proof about his business dealings when questioned by the Bangladeshi ACC. An investigation also found that he had no Swiss bank account and barely had any assets in his name.

=== Partnership with Adnan Khashoggi ===
In an article written by Moosa, he claims that he was a close friend and business partner of the Saudi international arms-dealer Adnan Khashoggi. According to him they regularly worked together in brokering deals and traded arms mainly in Africa. Moosa stated in 2019 that when Adnan Khashoggi died in 2017, he left Moosa billions of dollars in his will. A Zambian news outlet reported in 2018 that before the demise of Adnan Khashoggi, Khashoggi spoke to Moosa on the phone and let Moosa in on many game-changing military secrets, known only to a few elite individuals in the world. The report also stated that Moosa claimed Khashoggi instructed him to do everything possible to bring peace between North Korea and the United States.

=== Acquisition of Rupali Bank ===
In August 2006, Moosa backed a deal made by his friend, Saudi prince Bandar bin Muhammad Al-Saud, to acquire a majority 67% stake in the Bangladeshi state owned bank Rupali Bank for US$330 million. Prince Bandar Al-Saud also pledged to invest US$6 billion to the emerging markets of the Bangladeshi economy.

== Media ==
=== DATCO group ===
Formed in 1975, Shamsher's business DATCO is now primarily engaged in the export of labour in the form of migrant rural farmers from Bangladesh to the booming construction industries in the Middle West.

=== Offering donation ===
During the UK 1997 general election it was reported that Moosa offered the Labour Party and Tony Blair a £5 million campaign donation. Although the party declined the donation, the offer itself received a lot of media attention.

=== Alleged brokering peace between Trump and Kim Jong-un ===
Moosa claims that the historic 2018 North Korea–United States Singapore Summit, where Donald Trump had a meeting with Kim Jong-un, was brokered by him. A Zambian news outlet reported that Moosa enlisted the help of Paul Manafort Jr. and sent a hand-written letter to Donald Trump advising him to back off from his standoff with North Korea. He claims that he wrote similar letters to Speaker of the House Paul Ryan, Prime Minister Shinzo Abe of Japan, and Crown Prince Mohammad bin Salman of Saudi Arabia. In the news report, Moosa stated that he helped bring peace between the United States and North Korea because prior to Adnan Khashoggi's death, Moosa spoke to him on the phone and he told Moosa about North Korea's nuclear missiles and extreme military power. Moosa states that a confrontation with North Korea would result in a Third World War, which had to be prevented at any cost.

== Personal life ==
Moosa married his elder brother's sister-in-law Kaniz Fatema Chowdhury in 1974. His father-in-law was Abu Naser Chowdhury, the last Zamindar of Dulai. The couple have 2 sons and 1 daughter. His son Zubi Moosa is a lawyer. His son Bobby Hajjaj is a politician. His daughter is married to Sheikh Fazle Fahim of the Sheikh family of Tungipara. Moosa is fluent in Bengali, English, and Urdu.

=== Controversy ===
==== Travel restrictions ====
According to an Indian online news outlet, United News of India, Moosa was warned not to travel to Middle Eastern countries because of the threat posed to him by Pakistan's ISI and Israel's Mossad. It was stated in the article that Moosa's relationship with Brunei was so good that it helped strain Brunei–Pakistan relations, much to the dismay of the ISI. Moosa believes that the 2004 Dhaka grenade attack on Sheikh Hasina was perpetrated by Pakistan, which is why he took it on himself to get revenge on Pakistan. Moosa also claims that the Mossad were after him because Israel wanted a share in the money that Moosa received after the death of Adnan Khashoggi, because Israel claims to have helped the duo in their arms dealings. Due to these alleged threats, Moosa filed many cases in different Bangladeshi police stations. Moosa claims that the Pakistani intelligence outfit repeatedly tried to attack members of Sheikh Mujib's family, but he always prevented any danger as he was always steps ahead of them. According to Moosa himself, he made an oath to Sheikh Mujib to always protect Sheikh Hasina.

==== Alleged collaboration with the Pakistan Army ====
In his native Faridpur, Moosa is referred to as "Nula Razakar" (razakar refers to Bengalis who collaborated with the Pakistan Army) for his alleged collaboration with the Pakistan Army in war crimes during the Bangladesh Liberation War.

==== Tax evasion ====
In March 2017, Bangladesh Customs seized a Range Rover which was smuggled in by Moosa. Moosa evaded a tax of Tk. 2.17 crore by registering the car under falsified import documents. The car was registered in Bhola under one of Moosa's associates' names after it reportedly paid a 130% import tax. However, after law enforcers searched the Chittagong Custom House for the car's bill of entry, they found out that the papers were falsified and no tax was paid. After seizing the car they realized that it was repainted from white to black, to confuse law enforcers. Moosa was charged with money laundering and evasion of duty by the Chittagong Custom House.

==== False statements regarding wealth ====
In June 2020, the ACC claimed that Moosa had misled the agency by lying about all his wealth and business dealings. They claimed that he presented himself as a prince, well-connected arms dealer, power broker, and businessman, whereas in reality, he couldn't provide the agency correct information regarding his wealth when he was being investigated. Moosa claims to have roughly US$12 Billion and US$10 million worth (in 2020 dollars) of diamonds frozen in his Swiss bank accounts. He also claimed that he owned around 1,200 bighas (roughly 400 acres) of land in Savar and Gazipur. However, after the ACC investigated him, they found that his claims of having Swiss bank accounts and owning huge swaths of land were all false. When questioned about his arms dealing and Swiss bank accounts, he failed to submit any papers or records to prove his claims. The government probe found that he had only five cars and a house in the affluent Gulshan area of Dhaka (which has been handed over to a development company), all of which were owned by his wife. The only asset owned by him was an ancestral piece of land in his native Faridpur, which his siblings also had shared. The government probe also found out that his tall claims of political connections, private intelligence, and protecting Sheikh Hasina were all baseless self-made claims.

==== Fraudulent practices ====
In 2005, the CID filed a show-cause notice against Moosa on charges of defrauding three workers of Tk. 18.8 million. The CID claimed that Moosa promised 300 people overseas jobs but ended up deceiving them. The CID also accused him of abducting and vanishing one of his employees named Nazrul Islam. Other allegations against him included forgery; providing fake passports and visas; flattery, kidnapping, and violation of women. Cases and allegations have been filed against him since 1990. The journalists who leaked information regarding Moosa and his malpractices were harassed by miscreants hired by Moosa, and one of the journalists lost a limb.
