= Jahangir Kabir Nanak =

Bangladeshi politician

Jahangir Kabir Nanak FF
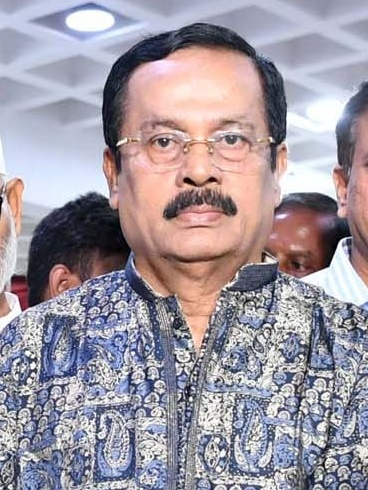
- Nanak in 2024

Minister of Textiles and Jute
- In office 11 January 2024 – 5 August 2024
- Prime Minister: Sheikh Hasina
- Preceded by: Golam Dastagir Gazi
- Succeeded by: M Sakhawat Hussain

Member of the Bangladesh Parliament for Dhaka-13
- In office 11 January 2024 – 6 August 2024
- Preceded by: Md. Sadek Khan
- Succeeded by: Bobby Hajjaj
- In office 29 December 2008 – 6 January 2018
- Preceded by: Ziaur Rahman Khan
- Succeeded by: Md. Sadek Khan

Minister of State for Local Government, Rural Development and Co-operatives
- In office 24 January 2009 – 24 January 2014
- Prime Minister: Sheikh Hasina
- Preceded by: Ziaul Haque Zia
- Succeeded by: Mashiur Rahaman Ranga

Presidium Member of Bangladesh Awami League
- Incumbent
- Assumed office 21 December 2019

Personal details
- Born: 14 January 1954 (age 72) Barisal, East Bengal, Dominion of Pakistan
- Party: Bangladesh Awami League
- Relatives: Abul Hasanat Abdullah (cousin); Abul Khair Abdullah (cousin); Abdur Rab Serniabat (uncle)
- Profession: Politician and lawyer

Jahangir Kabir Nanak (born 14 January 1954) is a Bangladeshi Politician and Presidium Member of Bangladesh Awami League. He was a Minister of Textiles and Jute of Bangladesh. He Elected as a Member of Parliament representing the Dhaka-13 constituency in three times. Previously, he served as the State Minister of Local Government, Rural Development and Co-operatives in 2nd Hasina Cabinet.

== Early life ==
Nanak was born on 14 January 1954 in Kshirad Mukherjee Lane of North Alekanda in Barisal, East Bengal, Dominion of Pakistan. His father, Maulvi Bazlur Rahman Serniabat, was an employee at the Barisal Collectorate Office. They belongs to the Bengali Muslim Serniabat family, who are direct descendants of Emperor Sher Shah Suri.

He has a bachelor's degree in art and law.

== Career ==
Jahangir Kabir Nanak was the President of the Bangladesh Jubo League and General Secretary of the Bangladesh Chhatra League.

Nanak was elected as Member of Parliament for Dhaka-13 in 2008 as an Awami League candidate. He was appointed state minister for local government, rural development and co-operatives in the second Hasina ministry.

In February 2009, during the Bangladesh Rifles mutiny he and parliamentary Whip Mirza Azam visited the mutineers to negotiate on behalf of the government following the orders of Prime Minister Sheikh Hasina. Nanak was reportedly shot at by the mutineers.

From 2009 to 2013, his wealth increased by 73 million taka along with other Awami League leaders while in power. His annual income increased from 943,000 taka to 4.64 million taka.

Nanak was elected unopposed as member of parliament for the Dhaka-13 constituency in 2014 as an Awami League candidate in elections which the opposition boycotted citing unfair conditions for the election.

In 2018, Nanak was not given the nomination from the Awami League. Instead the nomination for Dhaka-13 went to Sadek Khan. He told the media that disciplinary actions would be taken against Awami League candidates running as independents against official candidates of the party. He was the joint general secretary of the Awami League. In December 2019, Nanak was appointed presidium member of Awami League; the presidium council is the highest body of Awami League.

In December 2022, Nanak got stuck in a rally of Bangladesh Chhatra League Dhaka College unit who were demanding the formation of a committee at the college which had been suspended since 2013 following deadly fractional clashes. Nanak is in charge of Chhatra League affairs at the Awami League tried and failed to get them to stop their protests.

== Personal life ==
Nanak has a daughter, S. Amreen Rakhi. His only son, Fahimur Rahman Sayem (22), died in a car accident in 2011 in Cox's Bazar District.
