= Bobby Hajjaj =

Bangladeshi politician (born 1974)

- ববি হাজ্জাজ
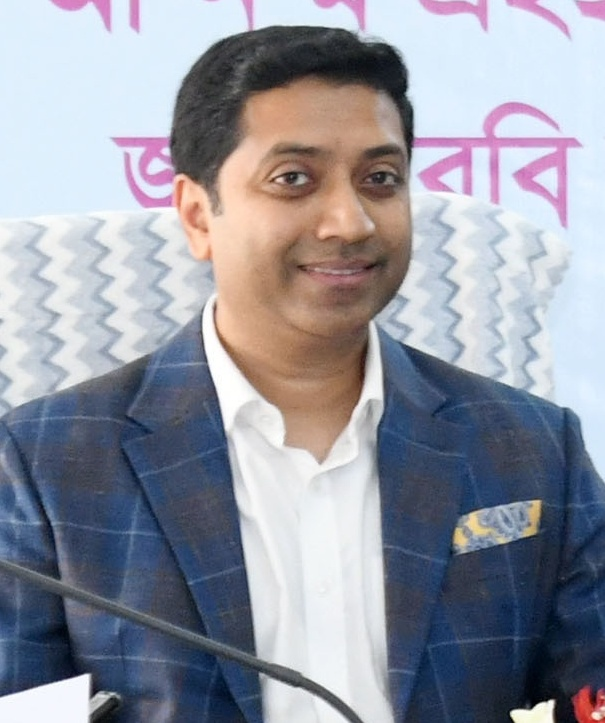
- Hajjaj in 2026

Minister of State for Primary and Mass Education
- Incumbent
- Assumed office 17 February 2026
- Prime Minister: Tarique Rahman
- Preceded by: Rumana Ali

Member of Parliament
- Incumbent
- Assumed office 17 February 2026
- Preceded by: Jahangir Kabir Nanak
- Constituency: Dhaka-13

Minister of State for Education
- In office 17 February 2026 – 4 March 2026
- Prime Minister: Tarique Rahman
- Preceded by: Shamsun Nahar

Chairman of Nationalist Democratic Movement
- Incumbent
- Assumed office 24 April 2017
- Preceded by: Office established

Personal details
- Born: Bobby Hajjaj; 7 April 1978 (age 48) Dhaka, Bangladesh
- Party: Bangladesh Nationalist Party
- Other political affiliations: Nationalist Democratic Movement
- Spouse: Rashna Imam (m. 2008)
- Relations: Chowdhuries of Dulai (maternal)
- Parent: Moosa Bin Shamsher (father)
- Education: Oxford University
- Website: bobbyhajjaj.com

Bobby Hajjaj (born 7 April 1978) is a Bangladeshi politician. He is the incumbent State Minister of Primary and Mass Education and a Jatiya Sangsad member representing the Dhaka-13 constituency since February 2026. Hajjaj is the founder of the political party Nationalist Democratic Movement (NDM). He contested from Bangladesh Nationalist Party for the 2026 election, where he won the Dhaka-13 seat.

== Early life and family ==
Bobby Hajjaj was born on 7 April 1978 to Bengali family in Dacca, Bangladesh, where he was raised. His father, Moosa Bin Shamsher, is a business tycoon regarded as the founder of the labor export industry, which along with the readymade garments export industry, have been the bastion of Bangladesh's economic success. The family are originally from the village of Qazikanda in Faridpur District. His grandfather, Shamsher Ali Mollah, was a graduate of the University of Calcutta and an education officer in Faridpur during British rule. Hajjaj's paternal forefathers were Mullahs, Islamic preachers, by vocation. Hajjaj's mother, Kaniz Fatema Chowdhury, was the daughter of Abu Naser Chowdhury, the final Zamindar of Dulai in Pabna District. His maternal forefathers had migrated from Samarkand, Turkestan in the 18th century. Hajjaj has two siblings. His sister Nancy Zahara is an entrepreneur and married to Sheikh Fazle Fahim, son of Sheikh Selim from the Sheikh family of Tungipara.

== Education and career ==
Hajjaj completed his initial schooling from Maple Leaf International School. He pursued higher education overseas, graduating from the University of Texas at Austin in the 1990s with a degree in political science. During his undergraduate years, he wrote for the university's student newspaper, he also worked in multiple state senate and gubernatorial election campaigns. He later advanced his academic journey by earning an MBA from the University of Oxford . After graduation, he worked in the financial industry in the US for a year before returning to Bangladesh. Upon return, he started work in business development and became a regular op-ed contributor to a few national English dailies, which included The Daily Star.

From 2003, onward, he spent three years mostly outside Bangladesh engaged in business development and strategy consultancy in the US, Europe, and the Middle East.

Since late 2009, Hajjaj has been stationed in Bangladesh. After his return, he worked as a lecturer and researcher in business strategy at North South University, and as a columnist with The Independent, until late 2013. Currently, he contributes to the op-ed column in Dhaka Tribune, speaking on social and political issues. In late 2015, he launched a citizen empowerment movement ShopnerDesh through which he worked with youth all over the nation on issues including education, mass urbanization, and radicalism of youth.

== Political career ==
=== Jatiyo Party ===
- 2012: Appointment as former president Hussain Muhammad Ershad's special adviser
- 2013: Jatiya Party and Ershad publicly confirms Hajjaj's role as special adviser.
- 2014: Hajjaj received a lot of media attention for criticizing the controversial 2014 Bangladeshi general election in which the ruling party Awami League's primary opposition party BNP did not take part. He was detained by Rapid Action Battalion (RAB) officials for 20 hours, in late 2013; right before the 2014 elections. According to Hajjaj, Ershad had appealed to withdraw his candidature but it was not accepted without any apparent reason.
- 2015: Announced independent candidacy for 2015 Dhaka North City Corporation mayoral elections on 21 March 2015.
- 2017: On 24 April 2017 he officially launched his political party Nationalist Democratic Movement.

=== 2015 Dhaka North City Corporation mayoral election ===
On 21 March 2015, Hajjaj declared his mayoral candidacy for the April North Dhaka City Corporation polls as an independent candidate. "I am declaring myself an independent candidate for the upcoming Dhaka North City Corporation polls as it is a non-partisan election. I was born in Faridpur. So, I want to take care of the capital," said Hajjaj while announcing his candidacy. He withdrew from the race on 9 April.

=== Nationalist Democratic Movement – NDM ===
In 2017, Hajjaj founded the Nationalist Democratic Movement (NDM), with a view to returning the power of government to the hands of the citizenry. The party describes itself as a broad based party that practices inclusive politics and champions democracy and citizen's rights, and our inherent national values. NDM stands on the four pillars of Bangladeshi nationalism, religious values, spirit of independence, and accountable democracy, and aims to build the nation of the people's dreams and to fulfill the dreams of Bangladesh's valiant freedom fighters.

=== Bangladesh Nationalist Party ===
Hajjaj resigned and left NDM and joined BNP and ran a successful election campaign for his nomination as MP in Dhaka-13 constituency in the 13th parliamentary election.

== Personal life ==
Hajjaj is married to Bangladeshi barrister, Rashna Imam. Together, they have two daughters.

== Controversy ==
1. In January 2018, Bobby Hajjaj claimed that a political alliance was forming between former President Hussain Muhammad Ershad and BNP leader Tarique Rahman. He stated that such an alliance would reshape Bangladesh's political landscape. The comment was widely criticized by political analysts and media outlets, who described it as unrealistic and misleading. Supporters of Prime Minister Sheikh Hasina’s government also condemned the statement, calling it irresponsible. The incident sparked debate about Hajjaj’s political positioning and drew significant media attention.
2. In May 2026, Hajjaj drew criticism after describing Dhaka University as a "coaching centre" during a podcast interview with Sameer Ahmed. He alleged that the university produced little original research and claimed some publications were plagiarisedThe remarks sparked condemnation from Dhaka University teachers, students, and pro-BNP platforms such as the Sada Dal, who called the comments "deeply disrespectful and irresponsible". Following widespread backlash, Hajjaj issued a statement on his verified Facebook page retracting the remarks. He clarified that the comments were made informally and did not represent the government's official position, expressing regret for the misunderstanding and reaffirming respect for Dhaka University's history and contributions.

== Notable Publications ==
Bobby Hajjaj has authored several books, essays, and academic articles on politics, society, and identity in Bangladesh.

=== Books ===
- "President-er Lungi Nai" – a satirical novel written in the tradition of magical realism, exploring themes of power and neo-colonialism.
- "Just a Thought" – a compilation of essays originally published in The Independent, covering topics such as society, economics, linguistics, and international relations.

=== Academic Articles ===
- "Charisma, populism, and the formation of national identity: Sheikh Mujib and Bengali nationalism,"

published in Nations and Nationalism (2023).

- "A relatedness‑based model of transformational leadership: a case study of Bangabandhu Sheikh Mujibur Rahman

and 1960s East Bengal," published in the International Journal of Public Leadership (2023).

- "Myths of nationhood: Cultural nationalism, political Islam, and the movement against sculptures in Bangladesh,"

published in the Asian Journal of Comparative Politics (2022).

- "Purveyors of Radical Islamism or Casualty of Cultural Nationalism: Situating Jamaat‑e‑Islami in Contemporary

Bangladesh Politics," published in the Journal of Asian and African Studies (2024).

- "The Persistence of Islamist Political Parties in Bangladesh: A Rational Choice Argument," published in the Journal of Asian and African Studies (2025).
