= Benzir Ahmed =

Bangladeshi politician

- বেনজির আহমেদ

Member of the Bangladesh Parliament for Dhaka-20
- In office 30 January 2019 – 6 August 2024
- Preceded by: M. A. Maleque
- In office 30 December 2008 – 29 January 2014
- Preceded by: Constituency created

Personal details
- Born: 29 February 1952 (age 74)
- Party: Bangladesh Awami League
- Children: 3
- Education: M.A.
- Alma mater: University of Dhaka
- Occupation: Politician

Benzir Ahmed (born 29 February 1952) is a Bangladesh Awami League politician and a former Jatiya Sangsad member representing the Dhaka-20 constituency.

== Early life ==
Ahmed was born on 29 February 1952 in the village of Bainna, Dhamrai, Dhaka District, East Pakistan, Pakistan, the third child among four brothers and two sisters. He attended Manikganj Govt. Debendra College and Dhaka University. He has a M.A. degree.

== Career ==
Ahmed was elected to Parliament in 2008 from Dhaka-20 as a Bangladesh Awami League candidate. He received the nomination to contest the 2018 election from Dhaka-20. He is the president of the Dhaka District unit of the Bangladesh Awami League. He was the President of Bangladesh Association of International Recruiting Agencies(BAIRA). In 2022 BAIRA Election, he lost to the panel led by Mohammad Abul Bashar.

== Political life ==
Benjir was elected as the first Member of Parliament in the Ninth National Parliament elections in 2008. During the Ninth Parliament, he was a member of the Petition Committee and the Parliamentary Standing Committee on the Ministry of Lands. In 2014, he did not participate in the election as he was not nominated. He was nominated by Awami League in the 11th National Parliament election held on 30 December 2018 and later got the candidacy of Grand Alliance. He was nominated by Awami League in the 12th National Parliament election held on 7 January 2024. He got 83,708 thousand votes defeating his nearest rival independent candidate Mohaddesh Hossain.
