= Rowail =

Village in Bangladesh

Rowail রোয়াইল
- Village / Union
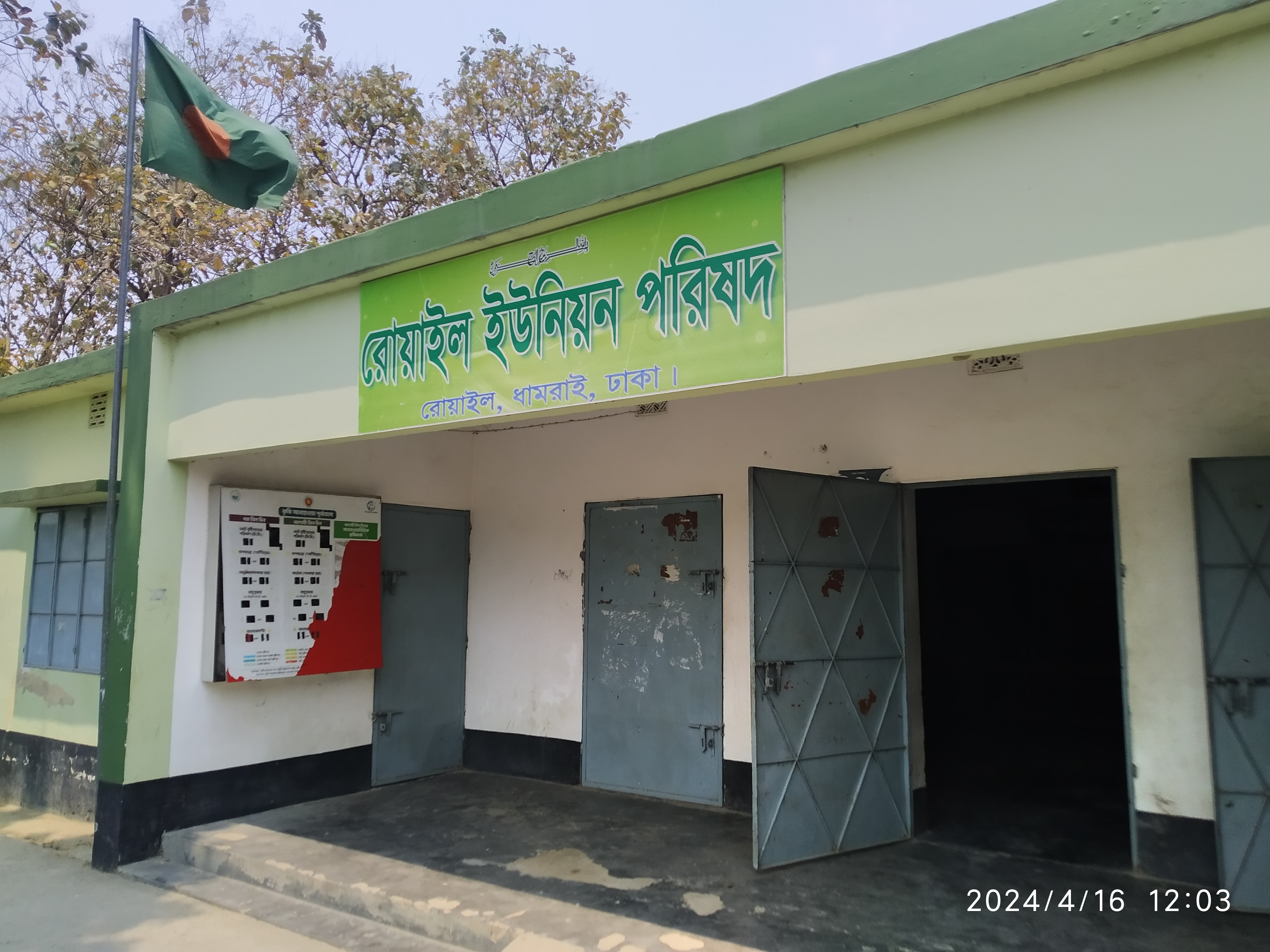
- Rowail Union, Dhamrai, Dhaka
- Country: Bangladesh
- Division: Dhaka
- District: Dhaka
- Upazila: Dhamrai
- Time zone: UTC+6 (BST)
- Postal Code: 1350

Rowail (Bengali: রোয়াইল) is a village and union parishad under Dhamrai Upazila of Dhaka District in the division of Dhaka, Bangladesh.

== Geography ==
Rowail is located at in the northwestern part of Dhaka district, functioning as one of the administrative union parishads of Dhamrai Upazila. The local economy is predominantly agrarian, featuring fertile alluvial soils typical of the region.

== See also ==
- List of villages in Bangladesh
- Nannar (village)
- Jalsin (village)
