= Md. Sadek Khan =

Member of Parliament Bangladesh

- মো. সাদেক খান

Member of Bangladesh Parliament
- In office 29 January 2019 – 29 January 2024
- Preceded by: Jahangir Kabir Nanak
- Succeeded by: Jahangir Kabir Nanak
- Constituency: Dhaka-13

Personal details
- Born: 3 June 1954 (age 72)
- Party: Bangladesh Awami League
- Education: BA
- Occupation: Business

Md. Sadek Khan (born 3 June 1954) is a Bangladesh Awami League politician and a former Member of Parliament from Dhaka-13.

== Education ==
Khan completed B.A. (Hon's.) in History from University of Dhaka. He was also Member of Bangladesh Chhatra League Dhaka College Unit on 1973.

== Career ==
In 1997, Khan was elected as the youngest councilor of the undivided Dhaka City Corporation and served until 2001. He was elected councilor four times from the then Ward No. 47 and the current Ward No. 34. He also received the best councilor award. He then served as Acting Mayor twice. In 1992, he became the president of Ward No. 47 Awami League.

After that, he served as the President of Mohammadpur Police Station Awami League from 1996 to 2015. He served as the President of the Election Management Committee of Dhaka-13 Constituency in the 1996, 2001 and 2008 Jatiya Sangsad elections. He was a member of the Dhaka College Chhatra League in 1973. He is the former General Secretary of Dhaka City North Awami League. He is the vice president of the Dhaka City North unit of Bangladesh Awami League.

Khan was elected to parliament from Dhaka-13 as a Bangladesh Awami League candidate 30 December 2018.

On 26 November 2023, Awami League announced the final list of its 298 candidates to contest the 2024 national election which did not include Khan.
