= Brassware industry in Bangladesh =

The brassware industry in Bangladesh is considered as a cottage industry and artisans with high workmanship make brass crafts by hand. The brassware of Bangladesh has good reputation in international market for uniqueness.

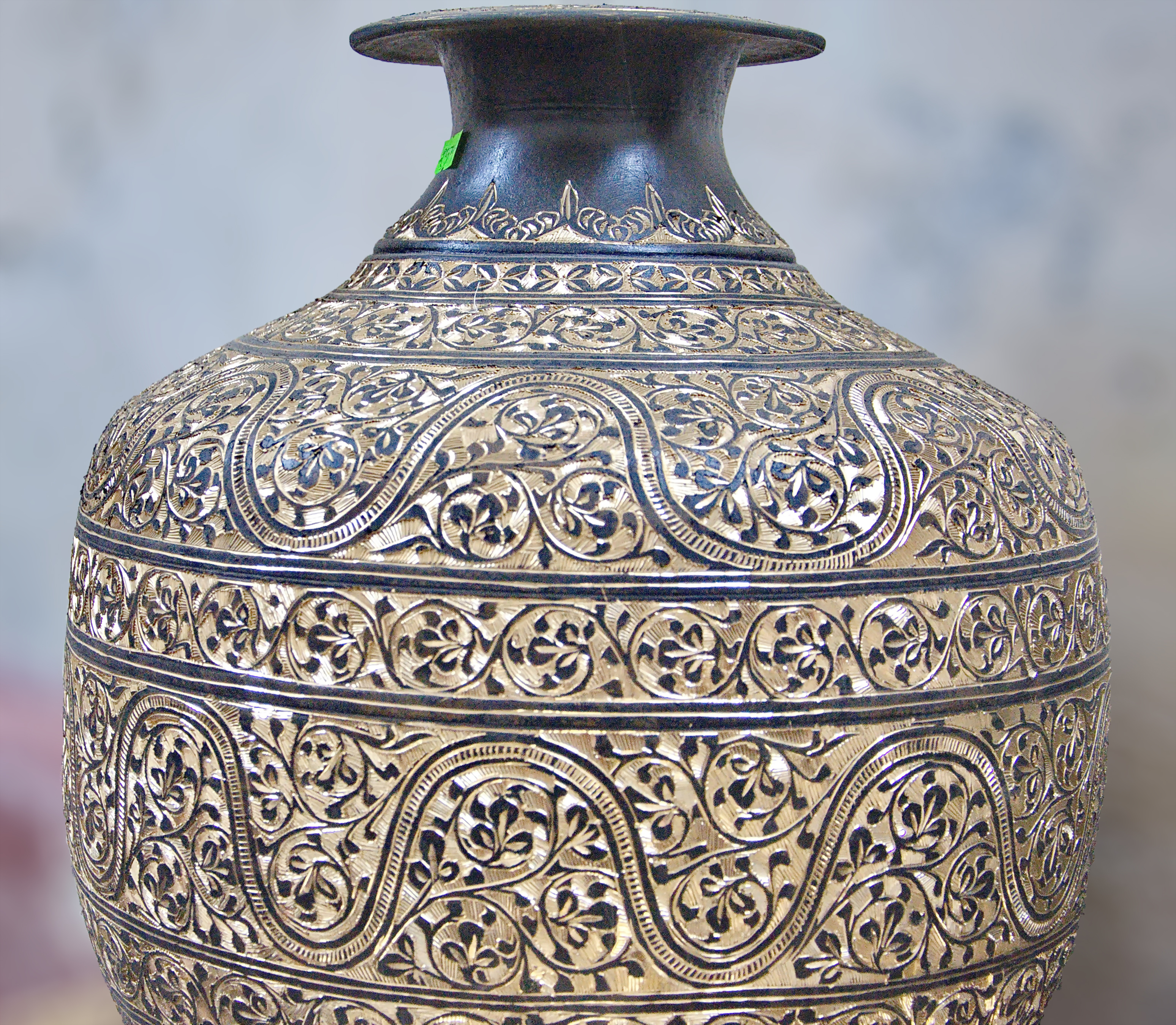
Brassware made in Dhamrai, Bangladesh

== Craftsmanship and heritage ==
Brass craftsmanship requires high skills. The best metal craftsmen in Bangladesh are of the Kansari (brazier) caste who has extraordinary skills in producing artworks in brass and silver. The heritage of craftsmanship is handed over from generation to generation.

== Location ==
The traditional cottage brassware industry in Bangladesh is primarily located in Dhamrai Upazila of Dhaka District. Besides that, there are also family based cottage brassware industries in Chittagong, Narayanganj, Nawabganj, Islampur of Jamalpur District, Rangpur, Tangail and Shariatpur.

== Processes of manufacturing brass crafts ==
Bronze crafts in Bangladesh are manufactured totally by hand without any machine works. The primary two things used in making brass crafts are wax and clay. These things are used to create a temporary mold that gives shape to the object.

Generally, two processes are used for making brasswares based on their size and shape:

The lost wax process: small objects that have solid brass inside are made in this process. Crafts made in this process are heavy in weight.

The hollow process: large objects with hollow inside are made in this process. Objects made in this process are comparatively light in weight.

== Major craft items ==
Brasswares made in Bangladesh include water pot, dish, bowl, cymbal, figurines of animals, wall hanging and table-top showpieces, candle holder, lamp shades, religious effigies etc.

== Current situation and challenges ==
A decade ago, there were about one thousand families involved in brass craft industry in Dhamrai, Now the figure has decreased to about one hundred. According to craftsmen, the reason for this decrease is increased price of raw materials and decreased demand of crafts due to availability of less expensive machine made steel, crystal, ceramics products. As a result, the brasscraft industry is losing its glory.
