= M. A. Maleque =

Bangladeshi politician

Member of Parliament

Personal details
- Born: 1 June 1953 (age 72) Dhaka, Bangladesh
- Political party: Bangladesh Awami League

M. A. Maleque (born 1 June 1953) is a Bangladesh Awami League politician and a former member of parliament for Dhaka-20.

== Career ==
Maleque was elected to parliament on 5 January 2014 from Dhaka-20 as a candidate of the Bangladesh Awami League. In June 2017, he supported the Hindu community Rath Mela in Dhamrai. The mela of the Hindu community was being opposed by Dhamrai municipal mayor Golam Kabir. In 2022, he was elected as president of the Dhamrai upazila unit of the Awami League.
