= Dhamrai Hardinge High School and College =

Dhamrai Hardinge High School & College
- ধামরাই হার্ডিঞ্জ উচ্চ বিদ্যালয় ও কলেজ

Location
- Dhamrai Uttarpara; Dhamrai Upazila; Dhamrai; Dhaka, 1350; Bangladesh
- Coordinates: 23°55′01″N 90°12′59″E

Information
- Type: Public
- Motto: আমাদের বিদ্যাপীঠ, আমাদের অহংকার
- Established: 1914
- Founder: Charles Hardinge, 1st Baron Hardinge of Penshurst, former Governor-General of India
- School board: Dhaka education board
- School code: 1607
- Principal: Julekha Begum (2023–present)
- Staff: 20
- Teaching staff: 66
- Grades: 6–12
- Gender: Male & female
- Enrollment: 2328
- Language: Bengali
- Campus size: 6.06 acres
- Campus type: Urban
- Sports: Racing, discus throwing, arrow throwing, sphere throwing, football, cricket etc.
- Mascot: Books with Rising Sun and Pens

Dhamrai Hardinge School & College (Bengali: ধামরাই হার্ডিঞ্জ উচ্চ বিদ্যালয় ও কলেজ) is a school in Dhamrai, Dhaka, Bangladesh.

== History ==
The school was established in 1914 as Dhamrai Hardinge School. It was founded by Charles Hardinge, 1st Baron Hardinge of Penshurst, former Governor-General of India.

The school was nationalized in 2018.

== Academics ==
The school offers primary and secondary education for boys and girls even though it is non-co-educational. Generally boys and girls are split into separate shifts. There are two shifts, morning and day.

The 100-year anniversary of this school was celebrated in 2017.
