= Ziaur Rahman Khan =

Bangladeshi politician (died 2021)

Member of Parliament for Dhaka-13
- In office 27 February 1991 – 29 October 2006
- Preceded by: Khan Mohammad Israfil
- Succeeded by: Jahangir Kabir Nanak

Personal details
- Born: 11 September 1945 Dacca, Bengal, British India
- Died: 24 April 2021 (aged 75) Dhaka, Bangladesh
- Cause of death: COVID-19
- Party: Bangladesh Nationalist Party
- Parent(s): Ataur Rahman Khan; Akramunnessa Khan

Ziaur Rahman Khan (11 September 1945 – 24 April 2021) was a Bangladesh Nationalist Party politician, lawyer and a Jatiya Sangsad member representing the Dhaka-13 constituency.

== Early life ==
Khan was born in Old Dhaka of Dhaka district. His father Ataur Rahman Khan was the Chief Minister of East Pakistan in 1956 and the Prime Minister of Bangladesh in 1984. He studied at St Edmund's School at Shillong and then at Faujdarhat Cadet College.

== Career ==
Barrister Ziaur Rahman Khan was a senior lawyer in the Bangladesh Supreme Court. He was elected to parliament from at that time Dhaka-13 as a Bangladesh Nationalist Party candidate in 1991, 15 February 1996, 12 June 1996 and 2001.

Ziaur Rahman Khan was defeated from Dhaka-20 constituency as a candidate of Bangladesh Nationalist Party in the ninth parliamentary elections of 2008. He did not contest in the general elections of 2018.
