= Dhaka-13 =

Constituency of Bangladesh's Jatiya Sangsad

- Constituency for the Jatiya Sangsad
- District: Dhaka District
- Division: Dhaka Division
- Electorate: 408,791 (2026)

Current constituency
- Created: 1973
- Party: Bangladesh Nationalist Party
- Member: Bobby Hajjaj
- ← 185 Dhaka-12 187 Dhaka-14 →

Dhaka-13 is a constituency represented in the Bangladesh Parliament since 2026 by Bobby Hajjaj of the Bangladesh Nationalist Party.

== Boundaries ==
The constituency encompasses Dhaka North City Corporation wards 28 through 34.

== History ==
The constituency was created for the first general elections in newly independent Bangladesh, held in 1973.

As of 2008, the constituency encompassed Dhaka City wards 41 through 46.

Dhaka City Corporation was split into Dhaka North City Corporation and Dhaka South City Corporation in 2011. For the 2014 general election, the constituency encompassed Dhaka North City Corporation wards 28 through 34.

== Members of Parliament ==
Election	Member	Party
1973	Gazi Golam Mostafa	Awami League
1979	Abul Hasnat	Bangladesh Nationalist Party
Major Boundary Changes
1986	Khan Mohammad Israfil	Jatiya Party
1988	Khan Mohammad Israfil	Jatiya Party
1991	Ziaur Rahman Khan	Bangladesh Nationalist Party
Feb 1996	Ziaur Rahman Khan	Bangladesh Nationalist Party
Major Boundary Changes
2008	Jahangir Kabir Nanak	Awami League
2018	Sadek Khan	Awami League
2024	Jahangir Kabir Nanak	Awami League
2026	Bobby Hajjaj	Bangladesh Nationalist Party

== Elections ==
=== Elections in the 2020s ===
General Election 2026: Dhaka-13
Party	Candidate	Votes	%	±%
BNP	Bobby Hajjaj	88,387	49.6	N/A
BKM	Mamunul Haque	86,067	48.3	N/A
Independent	Sheikh Md. Rabiul Islam	972	0.5	N/A
Independent	Sohel Rana	711	0.4	N/A
IBB	Fatema Akter Munia	513	0.3	N/A
BSD	Md. Khalekuzzaman	486	0.3	N/A
BML	Shahriar Iftekhar	464	0.3	N/A
GOP	Mizanur Rahman	336	0.2	N/A
BMJP	Md. Shahabuddin	331	0.2	N/A
Majority		2,320	1.3	N/A
Turnout		178,267	43.6	N/A
Registered electors		408,791		
BNP gain from AL				

=== Elections in the 2010s ===
General Election 2018
Party	Candidate	Votes	%	±%
AL	Md. Sadek Khan	103,163	68.1	
BNP	Md Abdus Salam	47,232	31.2	
JP(E)	Md Shafiqul Islam	1,233	0.8	
Majority		55,931	36.9	
Turnout		151,628	37.1	
AL hold				

Jahangir Kabir Nanak was re-elected unopposed in the 2014 general election after opposition parties withdrew their candidacies in a boycott of the election.

=== Elections in the 2000s ===
General Election 2008: Dhaka-13
Party	Candidate	Votes	%	±%
AL	Jahangir Kabir Nanak	125,120	59.7	+18.0
BNP	Shyed Mazzem Hossin	78,504	37.4	−20.4
IAB	Md. Nasim Khan	2,524	1.2	N/A
Bangladesh Kalyan Party	Sayed Md. Ibrahim	2,479	1.2	N/A
CPB	Khan Ahosan Habbib	427	0.2	N/A
BSD	Mohammed Monzur Hossain Nizami	402	0.2	N/A
BKA	Md. Mahabubur or Rashed Chowdhury	246	0.1	−0.1
Majority		46,616	22.2	+6.1
Turnout		209,702	74.1	−7.1
AL gain from BNP				

General Election 2001: Dhaka-13
Party	Candidate	Votes	%	±%
BNP	Ziaur Rahman Khan	106,007	57.8	+3.1
AL	Benazir Ahmed	76,495	41.7	+9.3
BKA	Md. Shamsuddin	357	0.2	N/A
Independent	Md. Rafiqul Hasan	329	0.2	N/A
JSD	Md. Emdadul Haq	233	0.1	N/A
Jatiya Party (M)	A. T. M. Habibur Rahman	126	0.1	N/A
Majority		29,512	16.1	−6.3
Turnout		183,547	81.2	−1.5
BNP hold				

=== Elections in the 1990s ===
General Election June 1996: Dhaka-13
Party	Candidate	Votes	%	±%
BNP	Ziaur Rahman Khan	76,427	54.7	−6.3
AL	Khan Mohammad Iqbal	45,164	32.4	−1.6
Samridhya Bangladesh Andolon	Iqbal Ahmed	5,454	3.9	N/A
JP(E)	A. B. S. Sharfuddin Khan	4,624	3.3	N/A
Gano Forum	Jamal Uddin Ahmed	2,991	2.1	N/A
Jamaat	Md. Abdur Rauf	2,384	1.7	+0.2
IOJ	Md. Shafiul Alam	1,753	1.3	0.0
Zaker Party	Md. Nurul Islam	514	0.4	−0.5
JSD (Rab)	M. A. Mannan	296	0.2	N/A
Majority		31,263	22.4	−4.6
Turnout		139,607	82.7	+13.1
BNP hold				

General Election 1991: Dhaka-13
Party	Candidate	Votes	%	±%
BNP	Ziaur Rahman Khan	81,034	61.0	
AL	Benazir Ahmed	45,194	34.0	
Jamaat	A. Karim	1,988	1.5	
IOJ	Shariful Alam	1,706	1.3	
Zaker Party	Md. Nurul Islam	1,253	0.9	
Bangladesh Janata Party	Nazmuddin Manju	1,159	0.9	
JSD (Rab)	Md. Imdadul Haq	484	0.4	
Majority		35,840	27.0	
Turnout		132,818	69.6	
BNP gain from JP(E)				
