= Khan Mohammad Israfil =

Bangladeshi politician

Member of Bangladesh Parliament
- In office 1986–1988
- In office 1988–1990

Personal details
- Party: Jatiya Party (Ershad)

Khan Mohammad Israfil (Bengali: খান মোহাম্মদ ইসরাফিল) is a Jatiya Party (Ershad) politician and a former member of parliament for Dhaka-13.

== Career ==
Israfil was elected to parliament from Dhaka-13 as a Jatiya Party candidate in 1986 and 1988.
