= Dhamrai Upazila =

Dhamrai ধামরাই
- Upazila
- Coordinates: 23°54.5′N 90°13′E
- Country: Bangladesh
- Division: Dhaka
- District: Dhaka

Area
  - Total: 307.41 km^{2} (118.69 sq mi)

Population (2022)
  - Total: 517,135
  - Density: 1,682.2/km^{2} (4,357.0/sq mi)
- Time zone: UTC+6 (BST)
- Postal code: 1350
- Area code: 06222
- Website: Dhamrai Upazila

Dhamrai (Bengali: ধামরাই) is an upazila of Dhaka district in Dhaka division, Bangladesh. It is the largest upazila in the district by land area.

Dhamrai Upazila mauza geocode map

== Geography ==
Dhamrai upazila is located about 40 kilometers northwest of the capital city of Dhaka. It is bounded by the upazilas of Mirzapur and Kaliakair on the north, Singair on the south, Savar in the east, and Manikganj Sadar, Saturia and Nagarpur on the west.

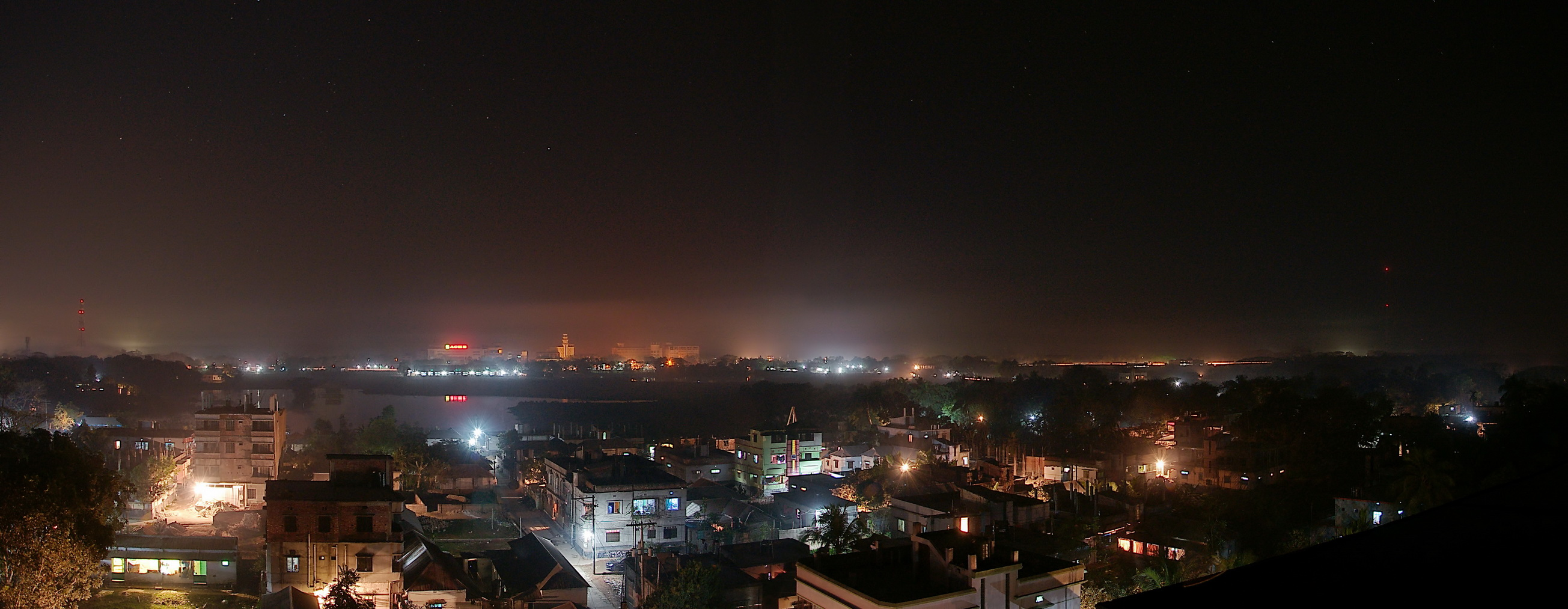
Dhamrai Night Panorama

The total area of the upazila is 307.41 km^{2}. Dhamrai upazila is composed of the alluvium soil of the Bongshi and Dhaleshwari rivers. Other rivers are Kolmai and Gazikha

== History ==
There are two theories on the naming of Dhamrai. The first is that during the time of Ashoka, there was a Buddhist called Dharmarajika and that the area was named after him. The discovery of a Buddhist stupa in Savar, about 10 miles from Dhamrai, lends credence to this opinion. Another theory is that in the early fourteenth century, five companions of the Sufi saint Shah Jalal (Tirmidhi Al-Husayni, Haji, Ghazi, Zam Bahadur, and Shah Makhdum) came and settled in the sparsely populated and heavily forested area. Food supplies ultimately ran short and one day they found a stray cow wandering about which they slaughtered the cattle to eat and satisfy their hunger. After a few days, they were approached by Dhama Gope and his wife Rai Goalini who claimed that the cow was theirs and demanded compensation for it. The Sufis learnt that the couple was childless. It is said that with their blessings a child was born to the couple and also they said that they would name the place so that their names would forever be remembered. Thus the name Dhamrai (Dham+Rai) came about. Dhamrai was a Zamindari Estate to the Dhar family established by Kashmiri Pandit Maharaja Virendra Mohan Dar of Akhnoor. The Zamindari comprised thousands of acres of land from Rajrajeshwar, Sheriffbag, Nannar, Dhamrai after the royal family shifted from Akhnoor. The Dhar Zamindar Palace was established in c. 1802 by the Maharaja in Dhamrai.

Territories of Dar Raj in Dhamrai Upazila, Bangladesh Territories under the Dar Raj Disputed territories under the Dar Raj

Dhamrai was once under the Thana (now Upazila) of Savar. Dhamrai became a Thana itself in 1914 during the British rule; the same year Dhamrai Hardinge High School was established. In 1947 it was put under the district of Dhaka. On December 15, 1984, Dhamrai was upgraded into a full-fledged Upazila.

== Demographics ==
Religions in Dhamrai Upazila (2022)
| Religion | Percent |
| Islam | 90.38% |
| Hinduism | 9.53% |
| Other or not stated | 0.09% |

According to the 2022 Bangladeshi census, Dhamrai Upazila had 134,023 households and a population of 517,135. 7.96% of the population were under 5 years of age. Dhamrai had a literacy rate (age 7 and over) of 73.72%: 77.45% for males and 69.99% for females, and a sex ratio of 100.54 males for every 100 females. 124,767 (24.13%) lived in urban areas.

According to the 2011 Census of Bangladesh, Dhamrai had 94,776 households and a population of 412,418. 81,402 (19.74%) were under 10 years of age. It had a literacy rate (age 7 and over) of 50.8%, compared to the national average of 51.8%, and a sex ratio of 992 females per 1000 males. 60,802 (14.74%) lived in urban areas.

As of the 1991 Bangladesh census, Dhamrai had a population of 312,777. Males constituted 50.37% of the population, and females constituted 49.63%. The population of citizens 18 years and older was 163,449. Dhamrai had an average literacy rate of 29.5% (7+ years), lower than the national average of 32.4%.

== Administration ==
The upazila consists of one municipality (pourasabha) called Dhamrai pourasabha, 16 union parishads, and 398 villages.

The union parishads are: Amta, Baisakanda, Balia, Bhararia, Chauhat, Dhamrai, Gangutia, Jadabpur, Kulla, Kushura, Nannar, Rowail, Sanora, Sombhog, Suapur, and Sutipara. They are collectively subdivided into 290 mauzas and 398 villages.

Dhamrai pourasabha is subdivided into 9 wards and 44 mahallas.

== Economy and development ==
The total cultivable land is 23,470 hectares. Of the total cultivable land (in hectares):

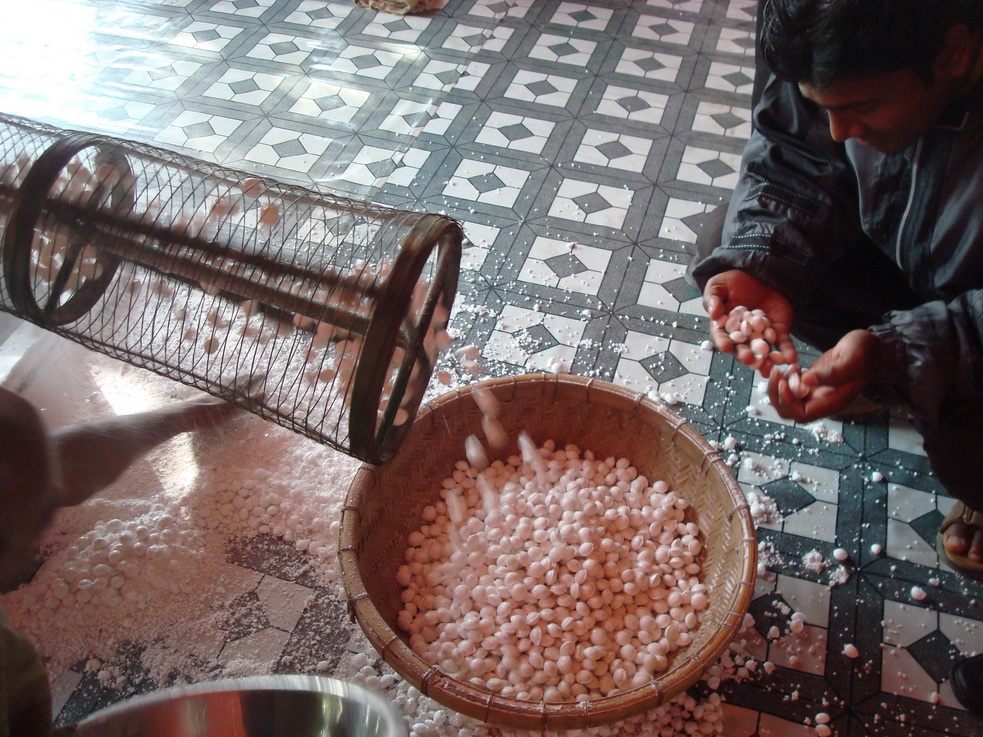
Guti-Urea plant at SOJAG, Shailan, Dhamrai

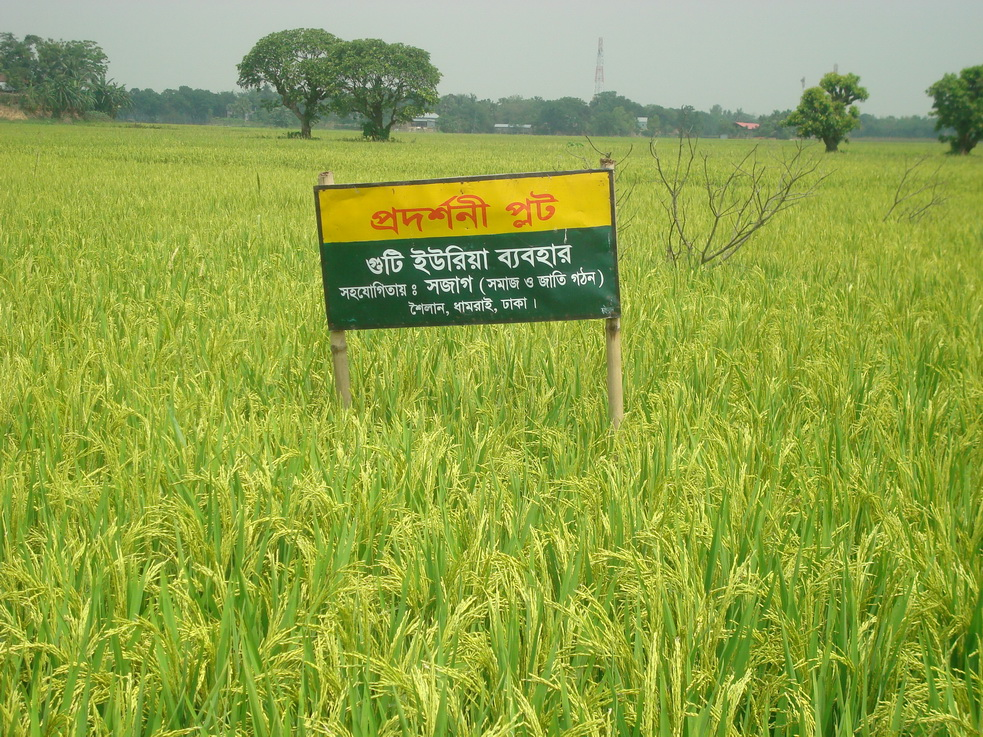
Guti urea demonstration plot in Dhamrai

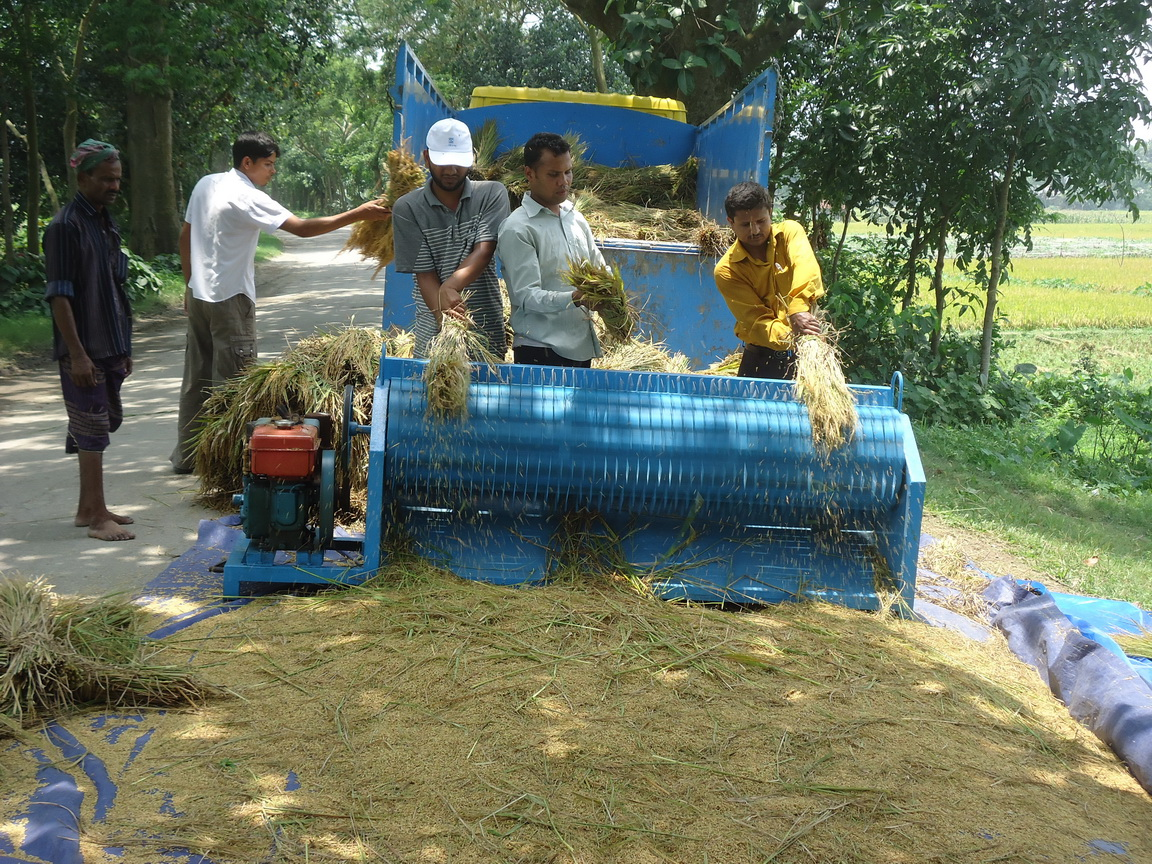
Paddy Thrasher at work

- 1 crop: 2,050
- 2 crop: 14,580
- 3 crop: 6,740
- More than 3 crops: 100
- Intensity of cultivation: 220.83%

Farmers by land occupancy:

- Landless (less than 0.02 hectares): 11,755
- Marginal (0.02 - 0.20 hectares): 10,670
- Middle (1.01 - 3.0 hectares): 5,675
- Big (more than 3.0 hectares): 535

Food production:

- Total demand (metric tons): 65,209
- Actual production (metric tons): 75,023
- Total surplus (metric tons): 9,814

=== NGOs working in Dhamrai ===
- SOJAG: Works throughout Dhamrai and adjoining upazilas of Mirzapur, Shaturia, Kaliakoir, and Singair. The headquarters is at village Shailan under Shombhag Union.
- Grameen Choa: Located at Dhantara Bazar, Dhamrai
- SDI: Located at Dhamrai Bazar, Dhamrai
- ASA: Located at, Dhamrai, Shimulia, Dhantara, Kalampur, Kushura, Kawalipara, Bathuli, Suapur.
- JCF: Located at, Dhamrai, Shimulia, Dhantara, Kalampur, Kushura, Kawalipara, Bathuli, Suapur.

== Culture ==
=== Dhamrai Ratha Yatra ===
The annual Jagannath roth jatra (Ratha Yatra) chariot festival is a significant Hindu festival that draws a large number of participants. Dhamrai is particularly renowned for hosting this event. The event typically commences around the 10th day of the Bengali calendar month of Ashar, followed by the ulto roth (return of the chariot) occurring approximately one week later. To mark this occasion, Dhamrai holds a month-long roth mela (Bengali: রথ মেলা). This festival commemorates the annual journey of the Hindu deities Jagannath, Balarama, and their sister Subhadra to their aunt's temple.

During the festival, devotees assist in pulling the chariot of the deities using ropes, considering it a sacred act, despite the potential risks associated with navigating the large crowds. The processions accompanying the chariots feature devotional songs performed on drums, tambourines, trumpets, and other musical instruments. Along the route, children gather to join in the chorus. The Roth cart itself stands at approximately 45 feet (14 m) tall and is pulled by the assembled pilgrims.

=== Handmade crafts ===
The primary hub for metal crafts in Bangladesh is in Dhamrai. For many generations, this place has produced handmade metal ware for markets throughout Bangladesh, using the lost wax casting (cire perdue) method and hollow casting method. These methods are used to make items ranging from ornate Hindu and Buddhist statues to simple household objects such as pitchers (kolshi as is locally called) and also items include quality statues, decanters, bowls, spoons, and plates. Over the past fifty years, many of the families in Bangladesh who have been involved in the metal casting trade have taken on other work. With stiff competition from inexpensive machine-made aluminium and plastic products coming in from India and other countries in the region, the market for hand-cast items has gradually dwindled away. As a result, the tradition of making handmade cast metal objects is in jeopardy. For example, there are only five people left in Bangladesh who are capable of making masterpiece-quality Hindu and Buddhist images using the lost wax method. The trade is at risk of disappearance due to the dwindling number of craftsmen.

Additionally, Dhamrai is home to several families engaged in the declining practice of earthenware crafting.

== Education ==
There are 139 government primary schools, 16 high schools, 25 junior high schools, 109 schools run by NGOs, 11 madrasahs, 6 colleges, and 1 agriculture college in Dhamrai upazila.

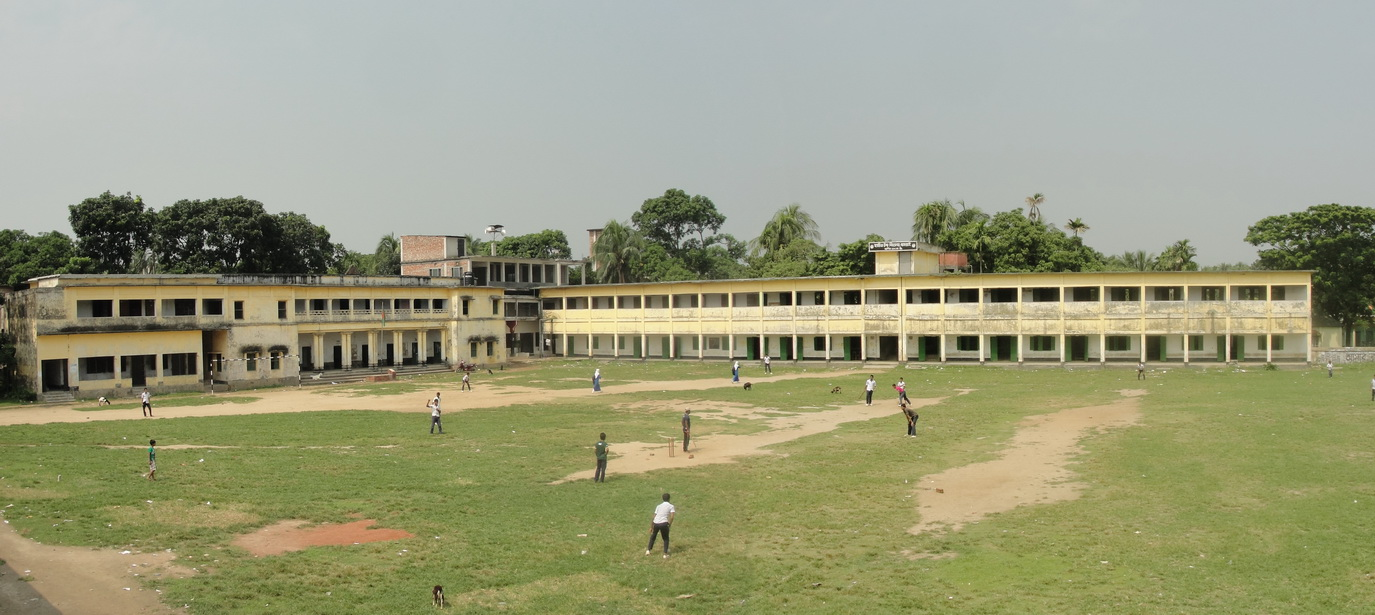
Dhamrai Hardinge High School

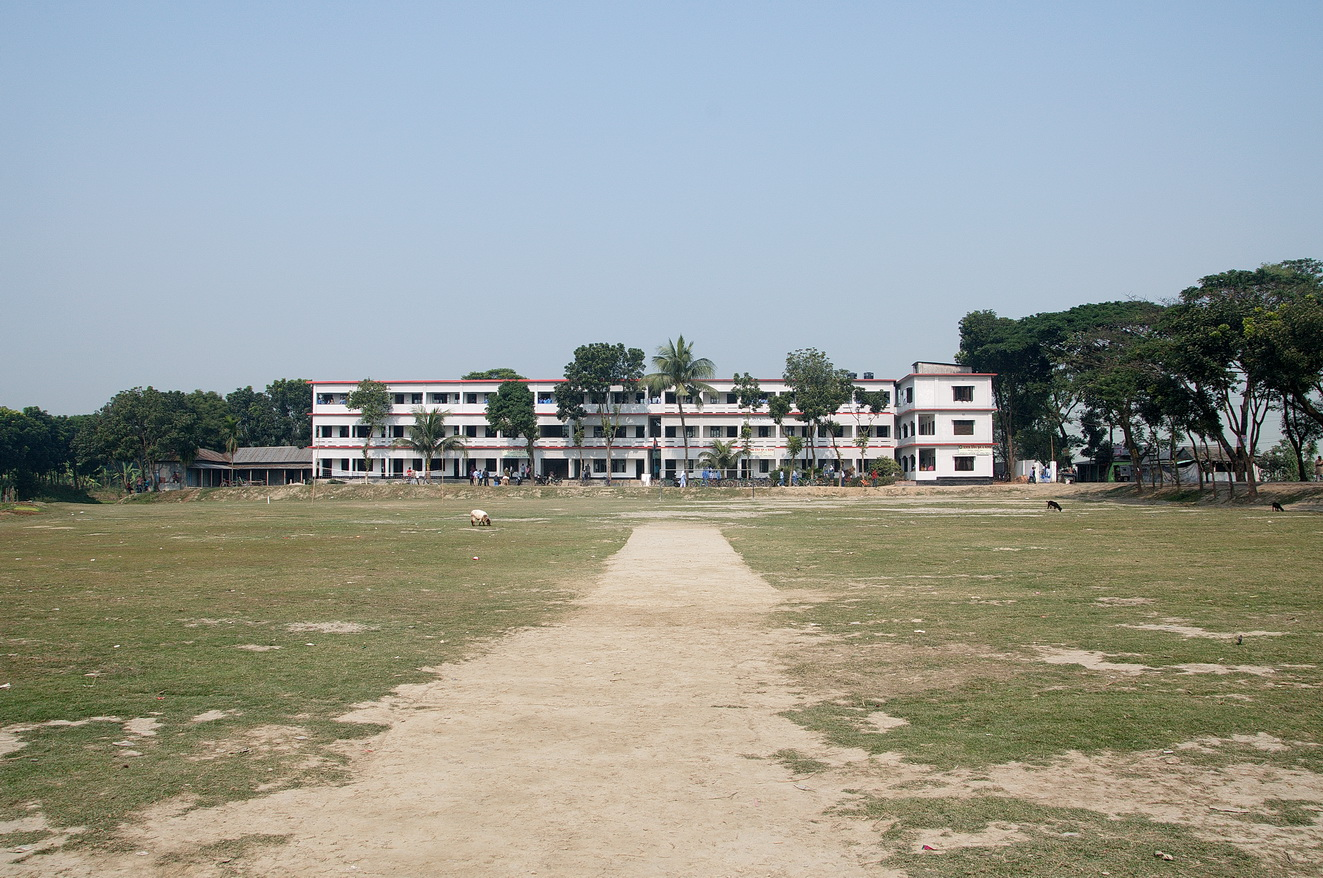
Afazuddin High School, Sharifbagh, Dhamrai

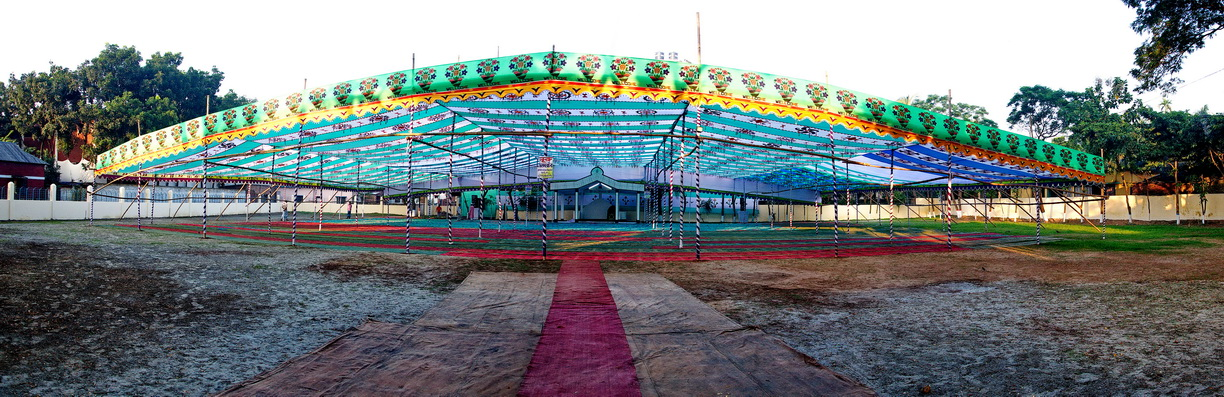
Dhamrai Central Eidgah

=== High schools ===
- Dhamrai Hardinge High School & College, established in 1914 after the British Viceroy Lord Hardinge
- Kushura Abbas Ali High School, established in 1941
- Abdus Subhan Model High School
- Haralal High School, Amta established in 1887
- Hamida-Afaz Girls High School, Kushura
- Ruail High School, established in 1857, as one of the oldest schools not only in Dhamrai but in India and Bangladesh. It is one of the four schools established in British India as early as 1857, the year of the Sepoy Mutiny
- Elokeshi High School, Jalshin, established in 1924
- Jadavpur B M High School, established in 1929
- Berosh Shibnath Shastri Institution, established in 1936
- Suapur Nannar High School, established in 1939
- Bhalum Ataur Rahman Khan High School, established in 1957
- Balia Wadudur Rahman High School, established in 1957
- Dhamrai Girls' High School, established in 1959
- Beliswar Mohini Mohon High School, established in 1967
- Nikla Z. Haque High School, established in 1970
- Bannol Lakkhu Haji High School, established in 1969
- Jalsha High School, established in 1972
- Shailan Surma High School, established in 1973
- Afazuddin High School, established in 1988
- Shailan Surma High School
- Rajapur Kahela Baharam Mollik High School, established in 1985
- Dhalkunda High School, established in 1973

=== Colleges ===
- Dhamrai Govt. University College, the highest educational institute of the locality.
- Dhamrai Hardinge High School and College
- Nobojug University College, established in 1972 in Kushura
- Abul Bashar Krishi College, established in 2003 in Mongolbari, Dhamrai
- Bhalum Ataur Rahman School Degree College, established in 1987, Bhalum, Kalampur
- Afaz Uddin School & College, established in 1988 in Sharifbag, Dhamrai
- Rajapur Begum Anowara Girls' College, established in Rajapur, Dhamrai
- Monmon School & College

== Notable people ==
- Ataur Rahman Khan, eminent politician and former prime minister of Bangladesh
- Azizur Rahman Mallick, former finance minister, education secretary, and ambassador
- ASM Tofazzal Hossain (Challenger), former actor
- Nurul Alam, educationist and vice chancellor of Jahangirnagar University
- Ziaur Rahman Khan, former politician and lawyer
- Akhtar Hossain Bhuiyan, bureaucrat
- Monira Mithu, actress
- Benzir Ahmed, politician and businessman
- M. A. Maleque, politician
- Maharaja Virendra Mohan Dar, Zamindar Maharaja of Nannar and Dhamrai from 1813-1821.

== Gallery ==
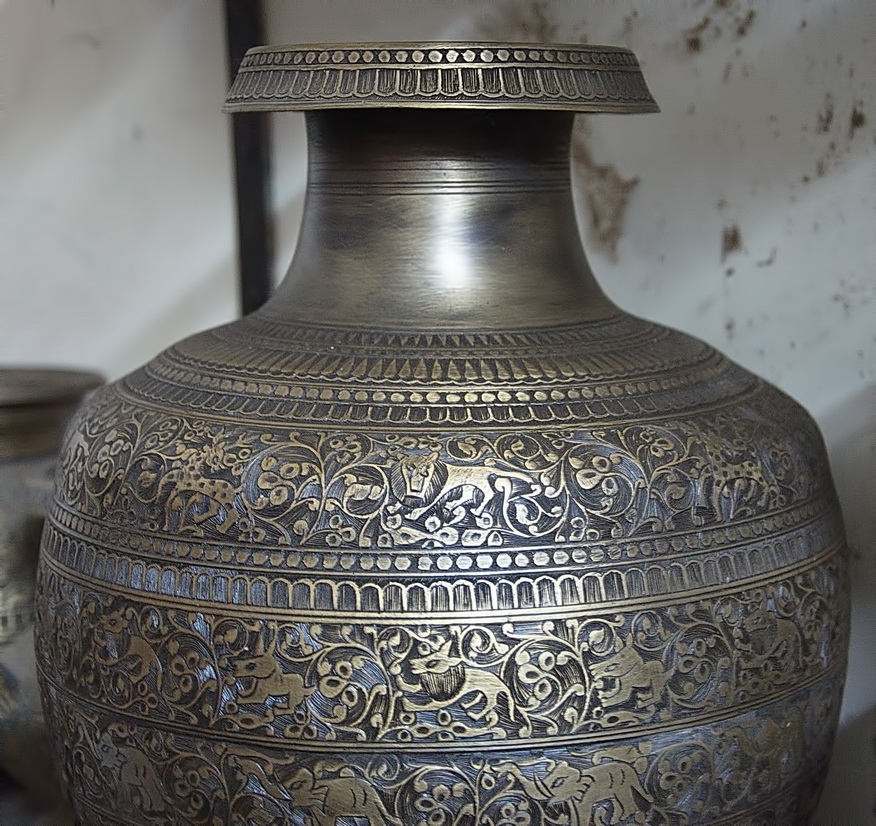
Metal work by Dhamrai Artisan

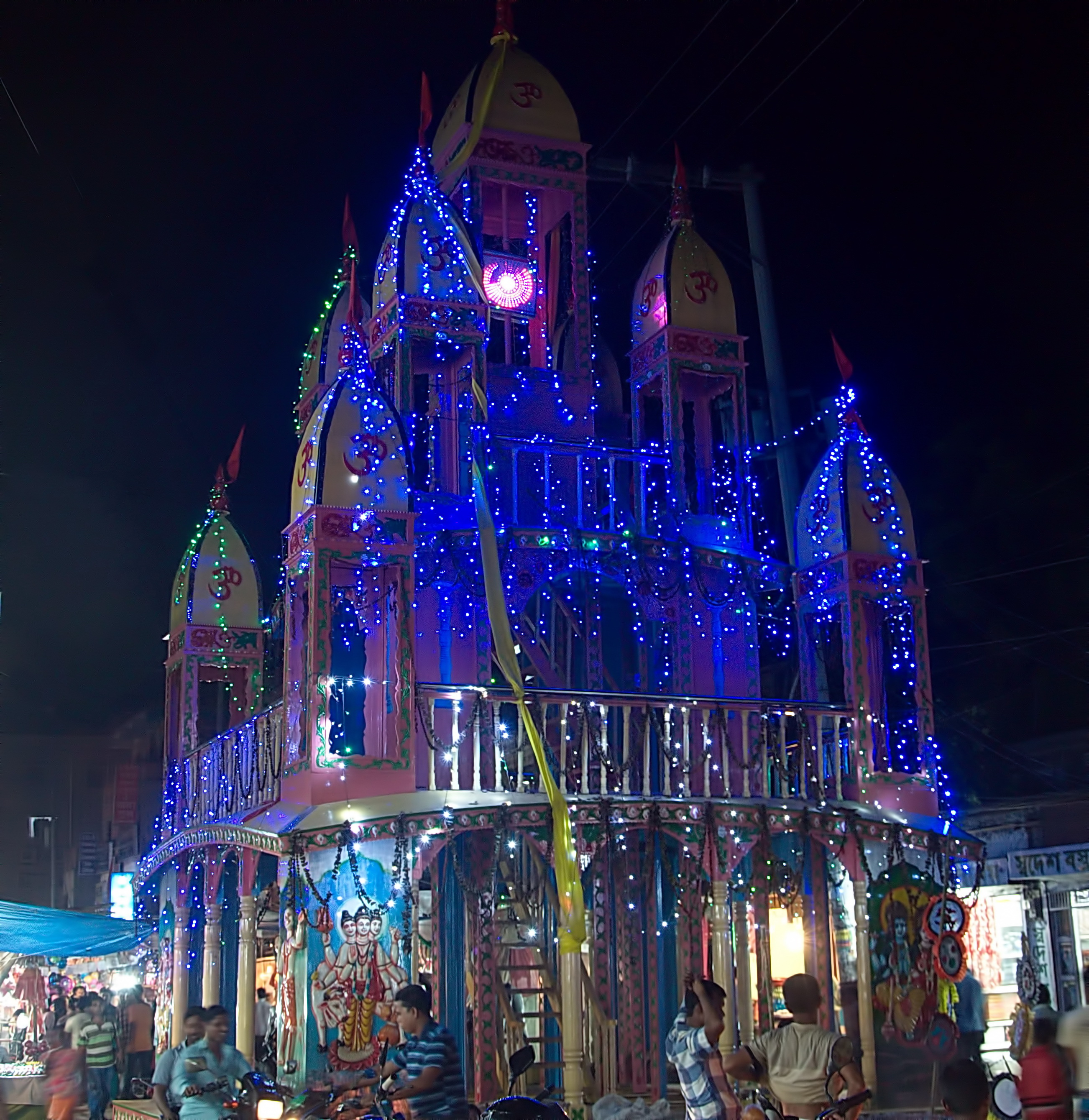
Dhamrai Roth at Night

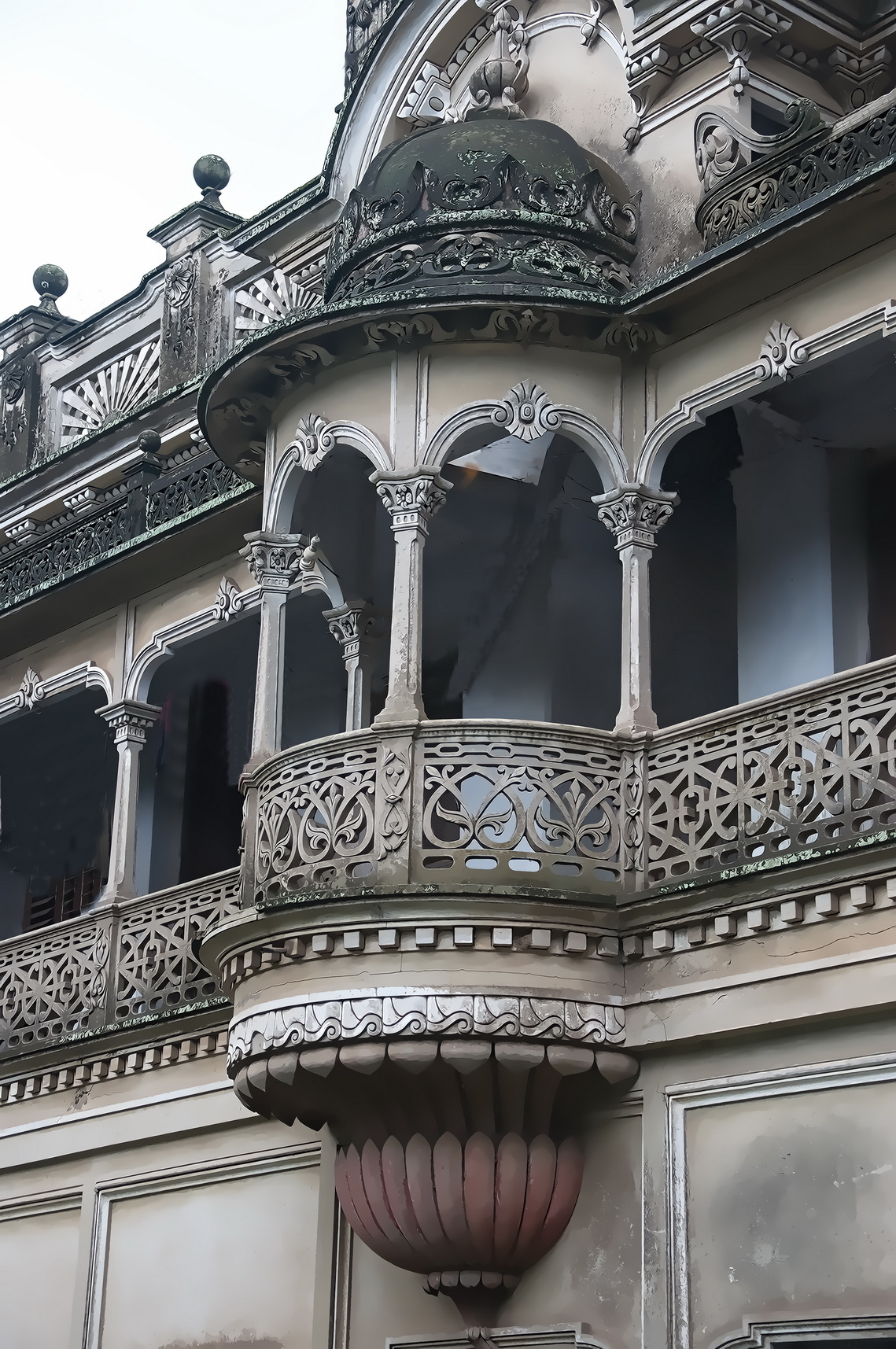
Old style building in Dhamrai

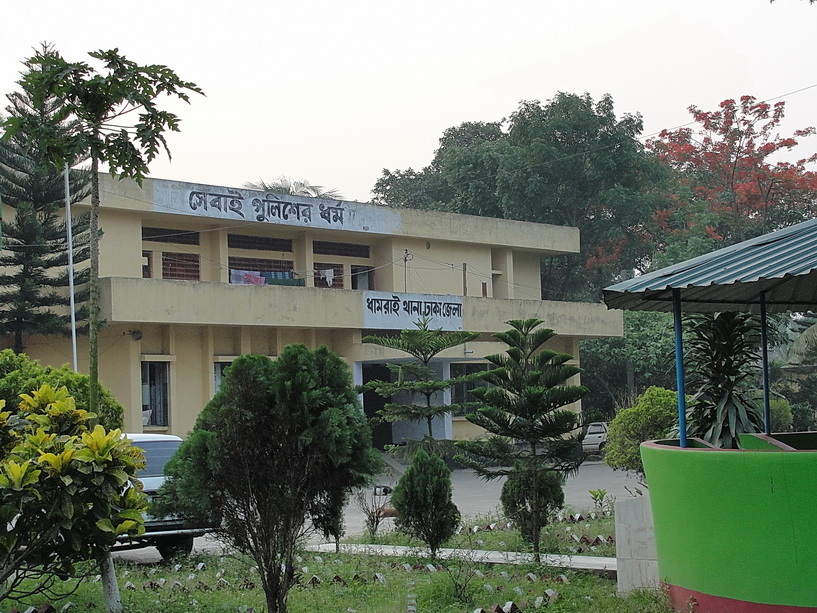
Dhamrai Police Station

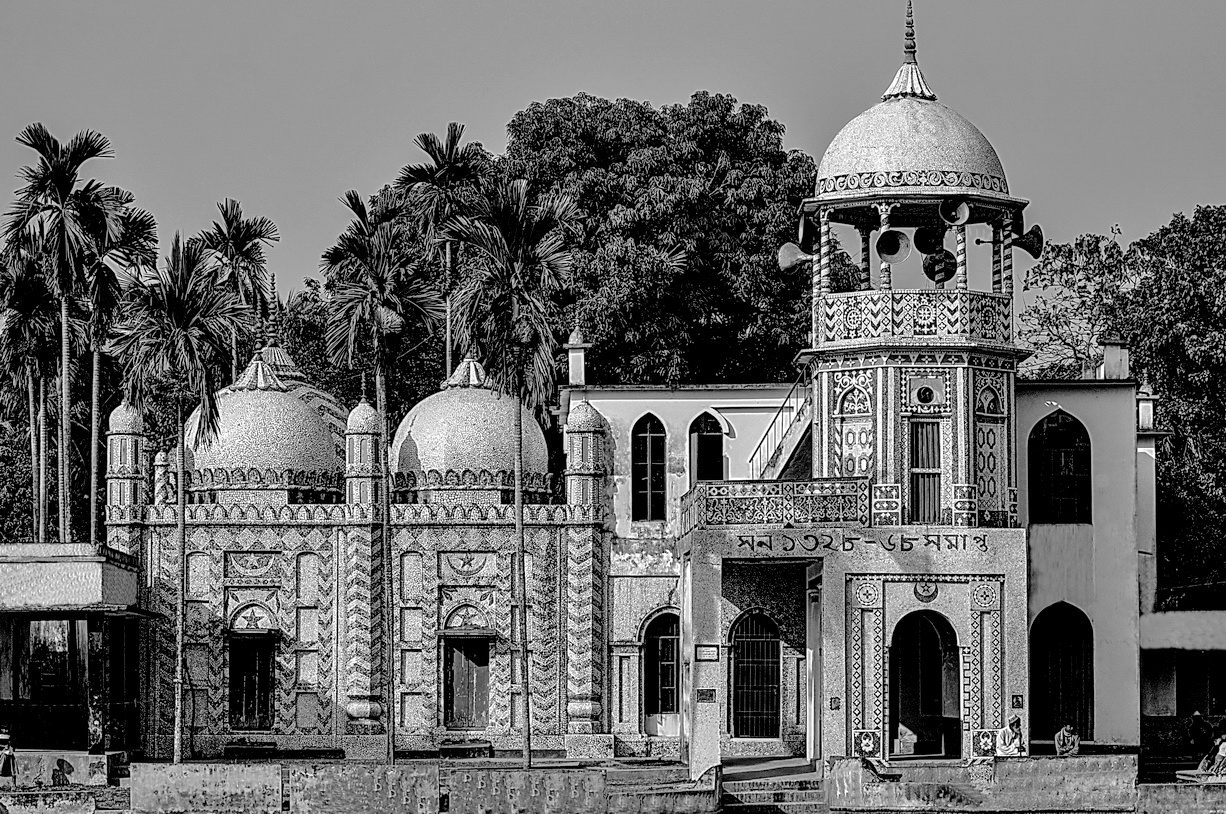
85-yr old mosque at Shailan

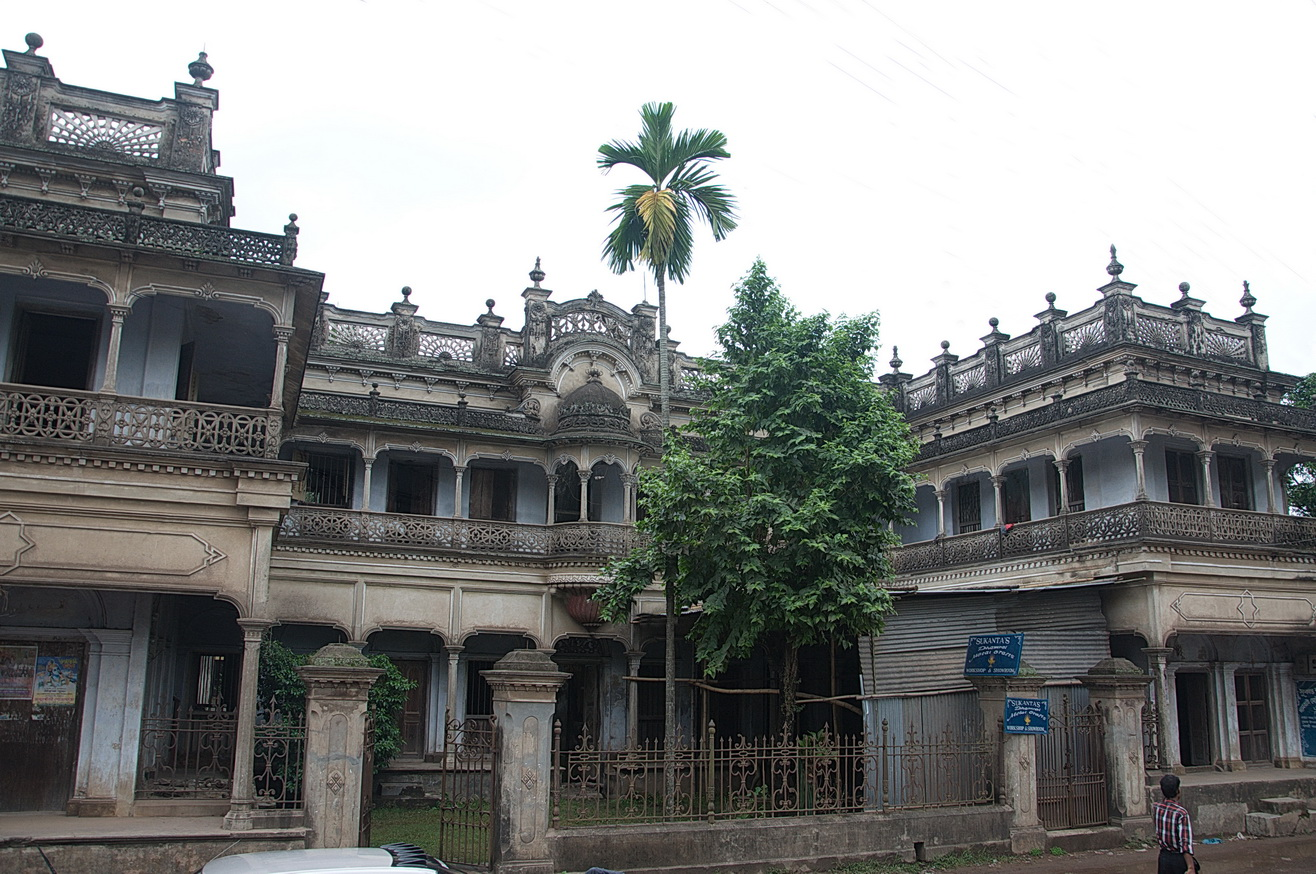
Majestic old building in Dhamrai

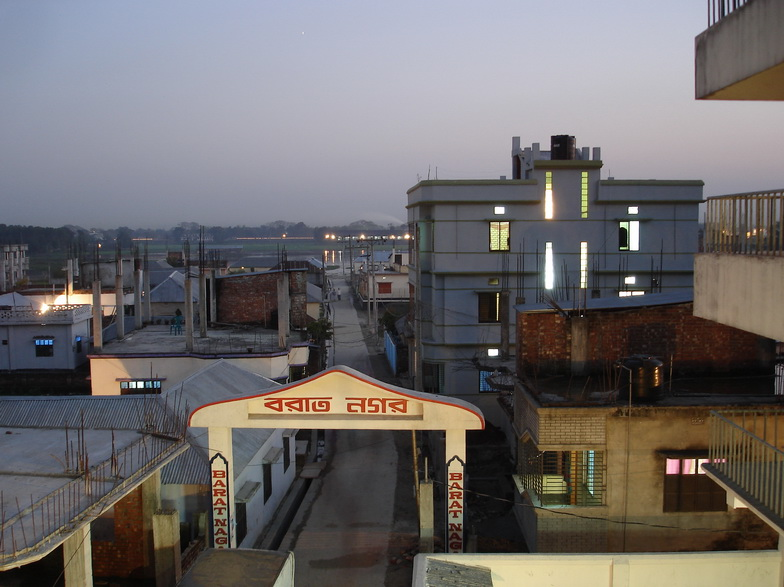
Borat Nogor at dusk

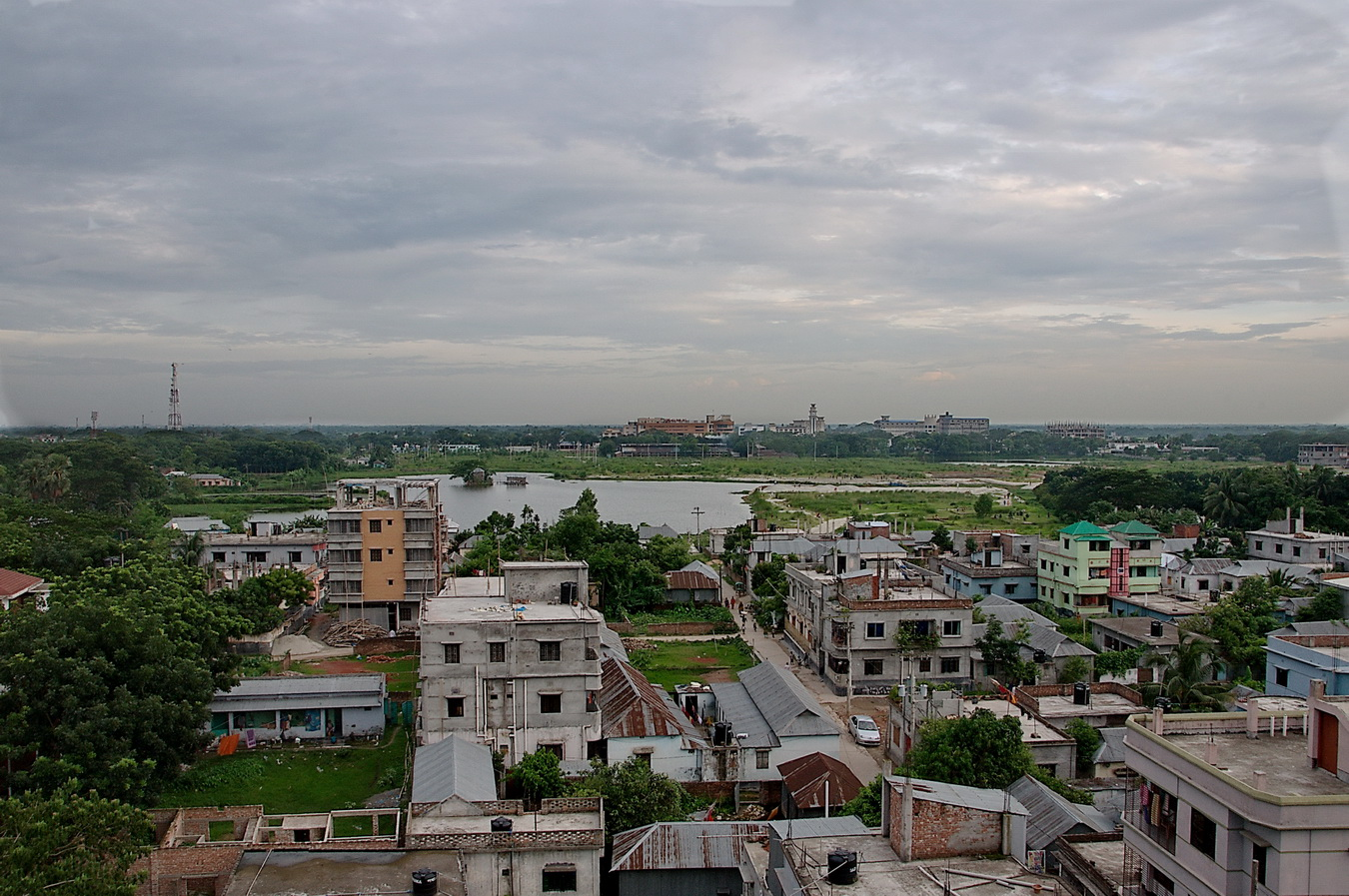
South end of Dhamrai Township

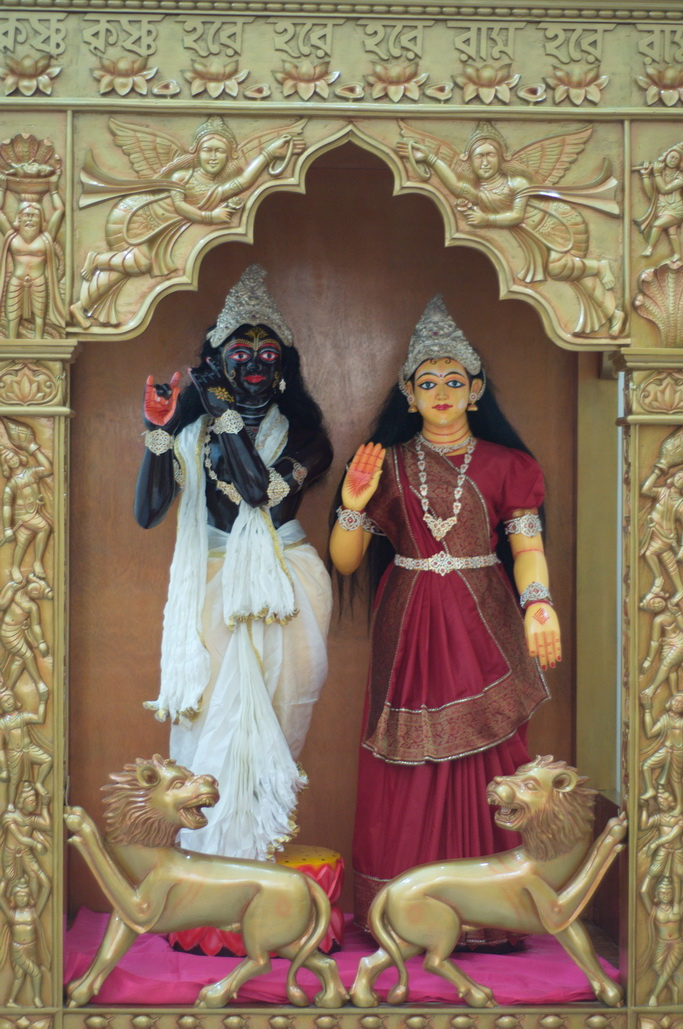
Madhob Mondir, Jatrabari, Dhamrai

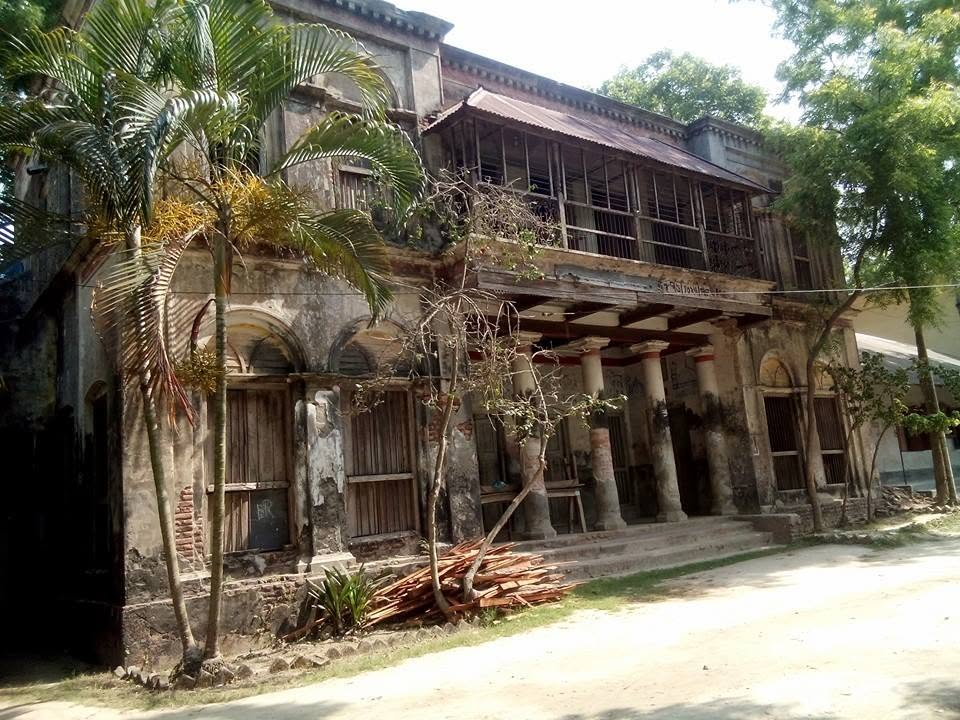
Ruins of the Dhar Zamindar Bari

== See also ==
- Brassware industry in Bangladesh
