= Sat Math (Bangladesh) =

- সাত মঠ
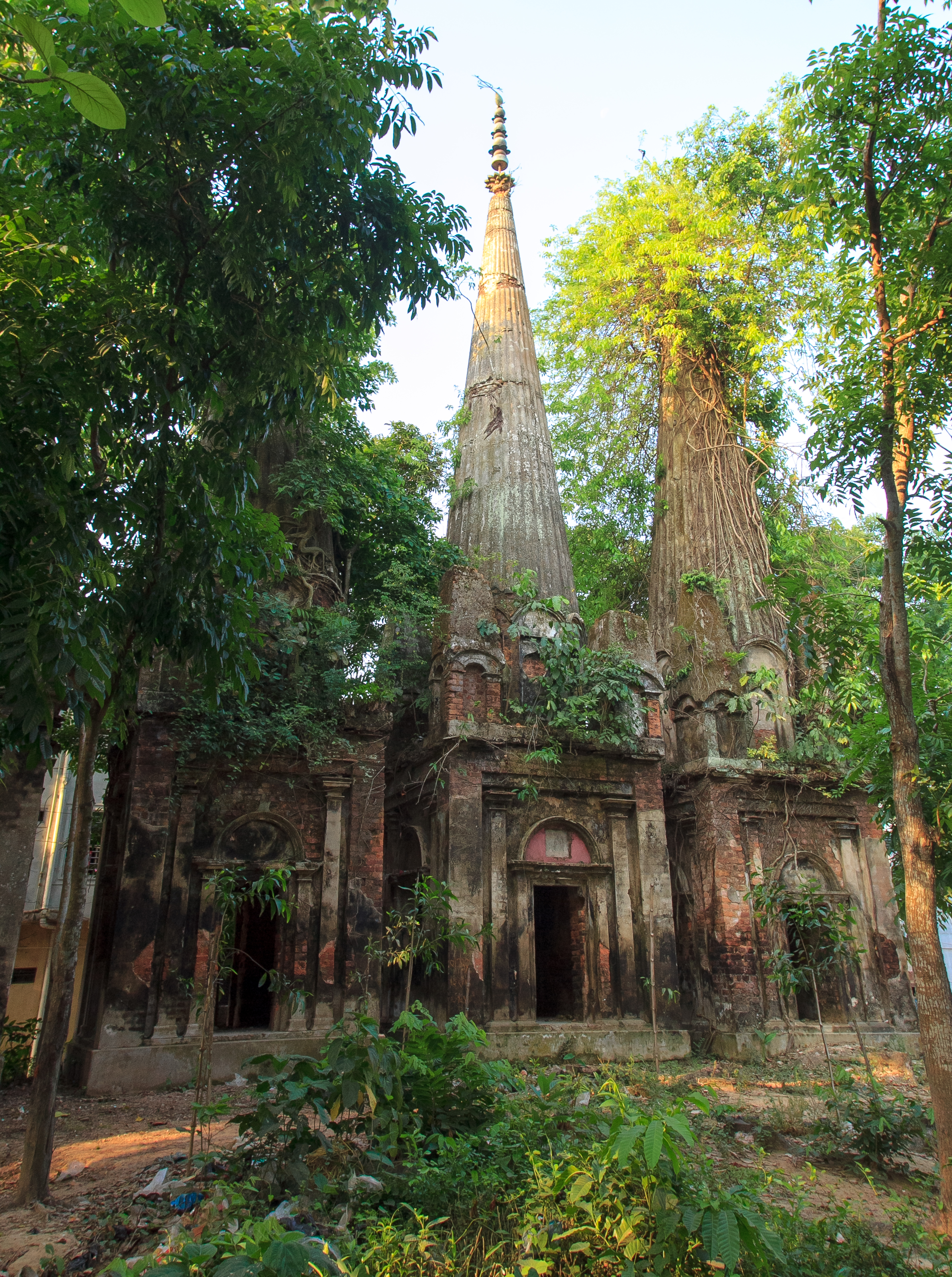

Religion
- Affiliation: Hinduism
- District: Feni

Location
- Location: Chhagalnaiya Upazila
- Country: Bangladesh
- Interactive map of Sat Math
- Coordinates: 23°2′13.6″N 91°30′42.8″E

Sat Math (Bengali: সাত মঠ, romanized: Sāt Maṭh, lit. 'Seven Monasteries') is an ancient monastery in Chhagalnaiya Upazila of Feni, Bangladesh, and is a listed historical structure under the Department of Archaeology of Bangladesh. It is established on eight acres of land near Satbari Road in West Chhagalnaiya village of the Chhagalnaiya Upazila town in Feni district. The house of Hindu zamindar Binod Bihari of Chhagalnaiya was built across this eight-acre area. As there are seven cremation temples beside his house, it is called Sat Mandir Bari (House of Seven Temples), Rajbari (Royal House), or Sat Math (Seven Monasteries). Around 1948, Zamindar Binod Bihari left for Kolkata, leaving the house behind. Currently, local residents live here. It is one of the oldest temples or monasteries in the Feni District.
