= Saifur Rahman Bhandari =

Bangladeshi politician

- সাইফুর রহমান ভান্ডারী

Member of Parliament for Bogra-6
- In office 1988–1990
- Preceded by: Abdur Rahman Fakir
- Succeeded by: Mojibar Rahman

Personal details
- Born: Saifur Rahman Bhandari Raz Bogra District
- Nickname: Raz

Saifur Rahman Bhandari is a politician of Bogra District of Bangladesh and former member of parliament for the Bogra-6 constituency in 1988.

== Career ==
Bhandari is a businessman. He is the son of Bhandari Shilpa family, a well-known industrial group in Bogra. He was elected to parliament from Bogra-5 as an independent candidate in 1988. He was also an independent candidate in the 2019 by-elections. He is the founding president and current advisor of the Bogra District Association.
