= Md. Zahurul Islam =

Bangladeshi politician

Member of Bangladesh Parliament
- In office 1996–2001
- Preceded by: Mojibar Rahman
- Succeeded by: Khaleda Zia

Personal details
- Party: Bangladesh Nationalist Party

Md. Zahurul Islam is a Bangladesh Nationalist Party politician and a former member of parliament for Bogra-6.

== Career ==
Islam was elected to parliament from Bogra-6 as a Bangladesh Nationalist Party candidate in September 1996 in a by-election. The by-election was called after Khaleda Zia, who was elected from multiple constituencies including Bogra-6, resigned and choose to represent Feni-1.
