= Habibar Rahman =

Bangladeshi politician

- হাবিবর রহমান

Member of the Bangladesh Parliament for Bogra-5
- In office 2008–2024
- Preceded by: Golam Mohammad Siraj

Personal details
- Born: 31 January 1945 (age 81) Dhunat, Bogra
- Party: Bangladesh Awami League

Habibar Rahman (Bengali: হাবিবর রহমান; born 31 January 1945) is a Bangladesh Awami League politician and the incumbent member of parliament from Bogra-5. He was elected as a member of parliament in 2018 as a candidate of Bangladesh Awami League.

== Early life ==
Rahman was passed HSC in 1962 from Government Azizul Haque College. He completed his graduation and post graduation from Rajshahi University in economics. After completing his studies, he joined the police.

== Career ==
Rahman was elected to parliament from Bogra-5 on 5 January 2014 as a Bangladesh Awami League candidate. He is an agriculture-based businessman and retired police officer. Rahman is actively involved in politics. He is the third elected member of parliament.
