= Government Azizul Haque College =

Educational institution in Bangladesh

- সরকারি আজিজুল হক কলেজ
- Emblem of Govt. Azizul Haque College
- Other name: Govt. A. H. College
- Motto: মনুষ্যত্বের বিকাশ ঘটিয়ে, মানবতার সেবক হও
- Motto in English: "Develop humanity, be a servant of humanity"
- Type: Public
- Established: 1939; 87 years ago
- Affiliations: University of Calcutta ^{(1941—1947)} University of Dhaka ^{(1947—1954)} University of Rajshahi ^{(1954—1992)} National University, Bangladesh ^{(1992—present)} Bangladesh Open University ^{(Study Centre)} Board of Intermediate and Secondary Education, Rajshahi (HSC)
- Principal: Professor Md. Mahfuzul Islam
- Vice Principal: Professor Md. Shamsul Alam
- Faculty: 210+
- Administrative staff: 180+
- Students: 35,000+
- Location: Bogura, Bangladesh; 24.8464°N 89.3566°E
- Campus: 63 acres (25 ha); Urban
- EIIN: 119246
- College code: NU - 2701; BOU - 861; Rajshahi Education Board - 4425
- Nickname: AHC
- Website: www.ahcollege.gov.bd

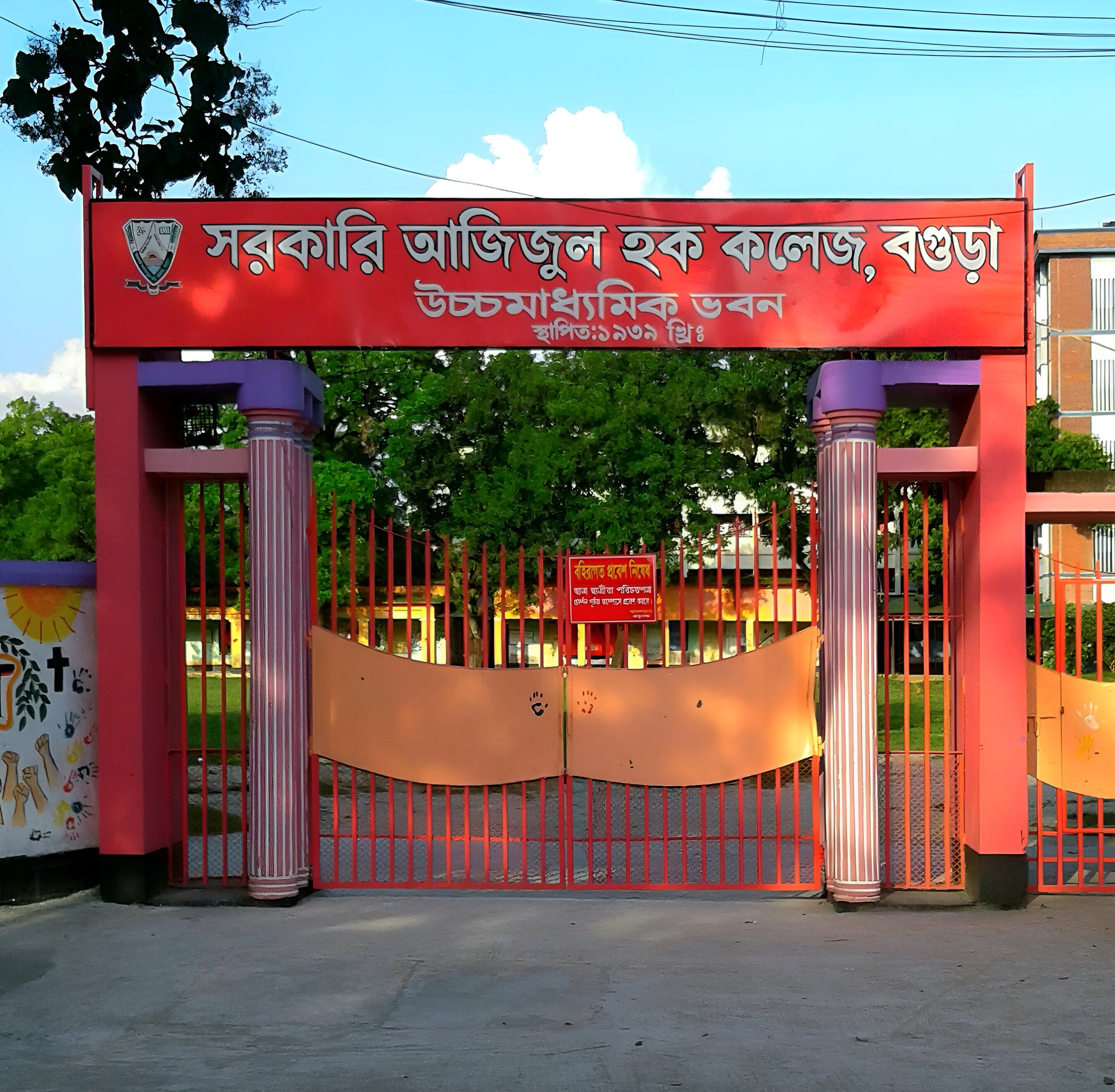
Old campus of Govt. Azizul Haque College

Government Azizul Haque College (Bengali: সরকারি আজিজুল হক কলেজ), also known as AHC or A. H. College, is a public college in Bogura district of Bangladesh. It is one of the largest and top-ranked educational institutions in northern Bangladesh. It was established in 1939 as a Higher Secondary college and named after Sir Azizul Haque, the then Vice-chancellor of Calcutta University.

The college is presently affiliated with the National University of Bangladesh and offers Bachelor's degree (Pass), Bachelor's degree (Honours), Master's Preliminary and Master's Final courses in various disciplines. It is also a Study Centre for the MBA (Bangla Medium) program affiliated with Bangladesh Open University. In the 'National University College Ranking 2018', AHC was ranked 3rd among all the affiliated colleges of National University.

== History ==
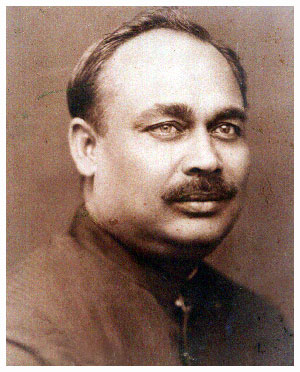
Sir Azizul Haque

On April 4, 1938, a committee was formed with Khan Bahadur Mohammad Ali MLA as the president and Moulvi Abdus Sattar as the general secretary to establish a college in Bogura. Other members of this committee included Dr. Habib ur Rahman, Zamindar Purnachandra Roy, Moulvi Md. Osman Gani, Moulvi Yaqub Ali, Dr. Kasir Uddin Ahmed, Prajabandhu Rajib Uddin Tarafdar MLA, Babu Nalini Chandra Chakraborty, Khan Bahadur Korban Ali, Syed Delwar Ali Chowdhury, Babu Prafulla Chandra Sen, Babu Shiv Chand Agarwala, Maulvi Chahir Uddin Ahmed and so on. With the efforts of this committee, the college started its academic journey on 9 July, 1939. Initially, it was known as 'Bogra College' and later it was named after Sir Azizul Haque, the then Vice-Chancellor of Calcutta University. Dr M. M. Mukherjee was the first Principal of the college.

The college organised its first classes at Subil Free Primary School in the northern part of Bogura town. Later, it was transferred to Fulbari Bottola. It was initially only one small, straw-shaded room. Marhum Moyen Uddin Pramanik and Marhum Rasidullah Sardar of Fulbari donated land to build a permanent building for the college.

In 1941, the college was sanctioned by Calcutta University with the efforts of Sir Azizul Haque, who was the Education Minister of united Bengal. In 1968, the college was recognized as a government college. The college has two campuses. The original 4 acres (0.016 km^{2}) of land is now known as the Old Residence of Azizul Haque College. Only Higher Secondary classes are administered there.

In 1962, through the efforts of Habibur Rahaman, the then Education Minister of Pakistan, a new building was established on 55 acres (0.22 km^{2}) of land. This part of the college is known as the New Residence of Govt. Azizul Haque College, where the classes of Degree, Honours and Masters are administered.

== Academic development ==
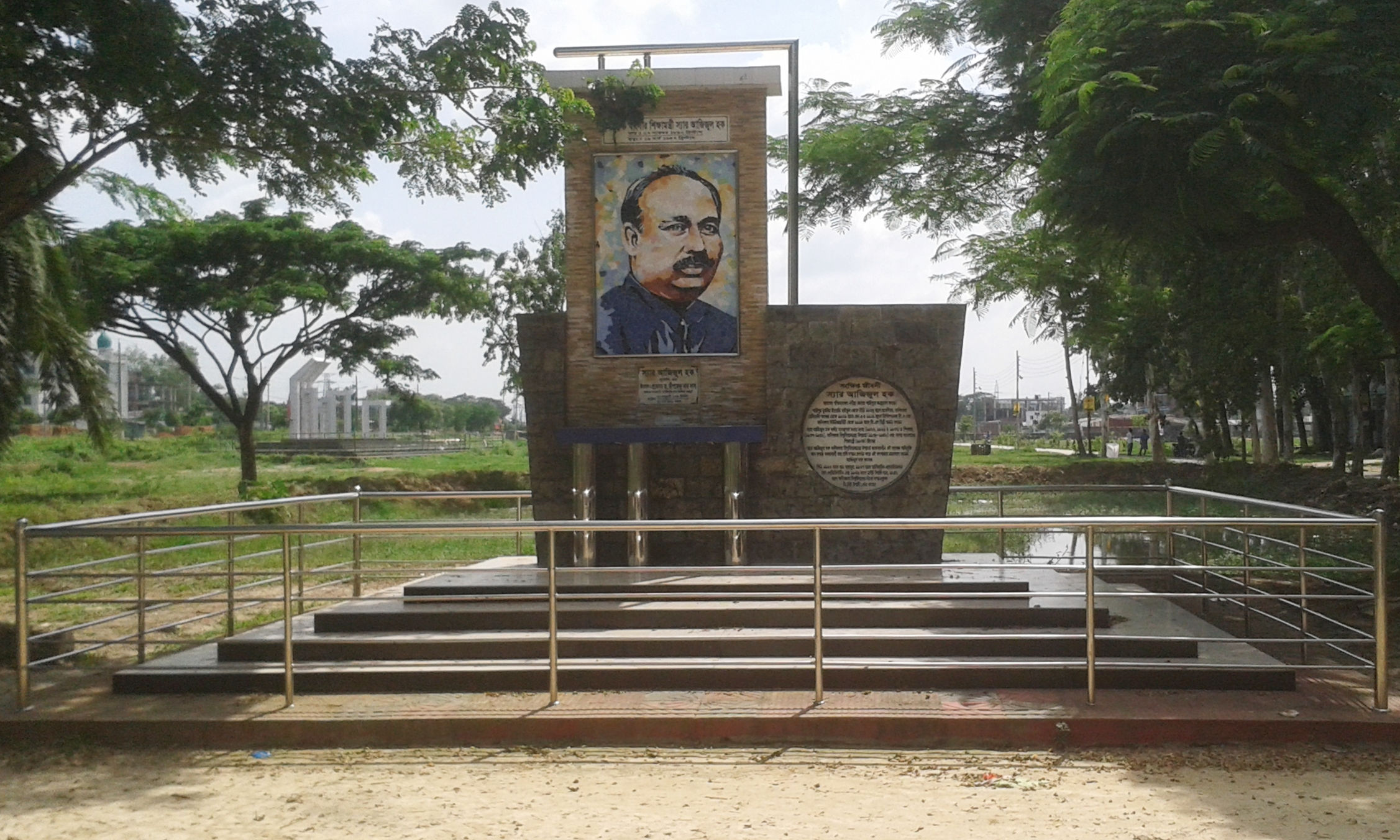
Memorial Sculpture of Sir Azizul Haque at AHC

Only Class IA (Intermediate of Arts) was allowed to study at the beginning of the college. In the beginning, there were about 200 students, while there was no female student. Among the first batch students, some names are found including Mojam Paikar, Amir Ali, Shafiqur Rahman, Abdul Malek, Nurul Islam Bhola and others. In 1941, the Intermediate Exam results of the first batch of the college was published, where 107 candidates passed out of 152. Among them, 08 candidates passed in the First Division, 64 candidates in the Second Division and 35 candidates in the Third Division. The pass rate was 69.2%.

At the time of establishment, IA classes were allowed to teach Bengali (General), Bengali (2nd Language), English (Compulsory), English (Additional), History, Islamic History and Culture, Logic, Philosophy, General Mathematics and Arabic/Persian. Those who served as teachers at that time were K. C. Chakraborty (English), Prabhat Chandra Sen (Bengali and Sanskrit), Md. Abdul Gafur (Arabic and Persian), Manindra Chandra Chaki (Mathematics), S. P. Sen (History), Md. Fazlur Rahman (Logic), Md. Akbar Kabir (Civics).

It is true that there were no female students in the college at the time of its establishment, but there was no restriction on the admission of female students. The admission of female students in the college started from 1943 and this number was 8 to 12. Later this number increased. Until 1953, the female students studied in the morning shift at the then V.M. Girls' School (now Bogura Government Girls' High School).

In 1941, the college got permission to start a two-year Honours class and BA pass course in the Department of Economics and the Department of Islamic History and Culture. But due to shortage of teachers and other difficulties, the College Management Committee introduced Honours and BA Pass courses only in the Department of Islamic History and Culture. Then from the academic year 1945–46, the college got permission to start Honours classes in the Bengali and Arabic departments and also to start I.Com class. After the partition of India in 1947, the college became legally affiliated to Dhaka University in the newly formed state of Pakistan. Due to administrative complications, the Honours class was abandoned in the college at that time, and the I.Sc Classes (Physics, Chemistry, Mathematics) were allowed to run. Biology was included in the I.Sc class in 1948–49 academic year. Sometime after this, in the academic year 1954–55, the college came under Rajshahi University and a three-year Honours class was introduced in the Department of Arabic and Department of Islamic History and Culture.

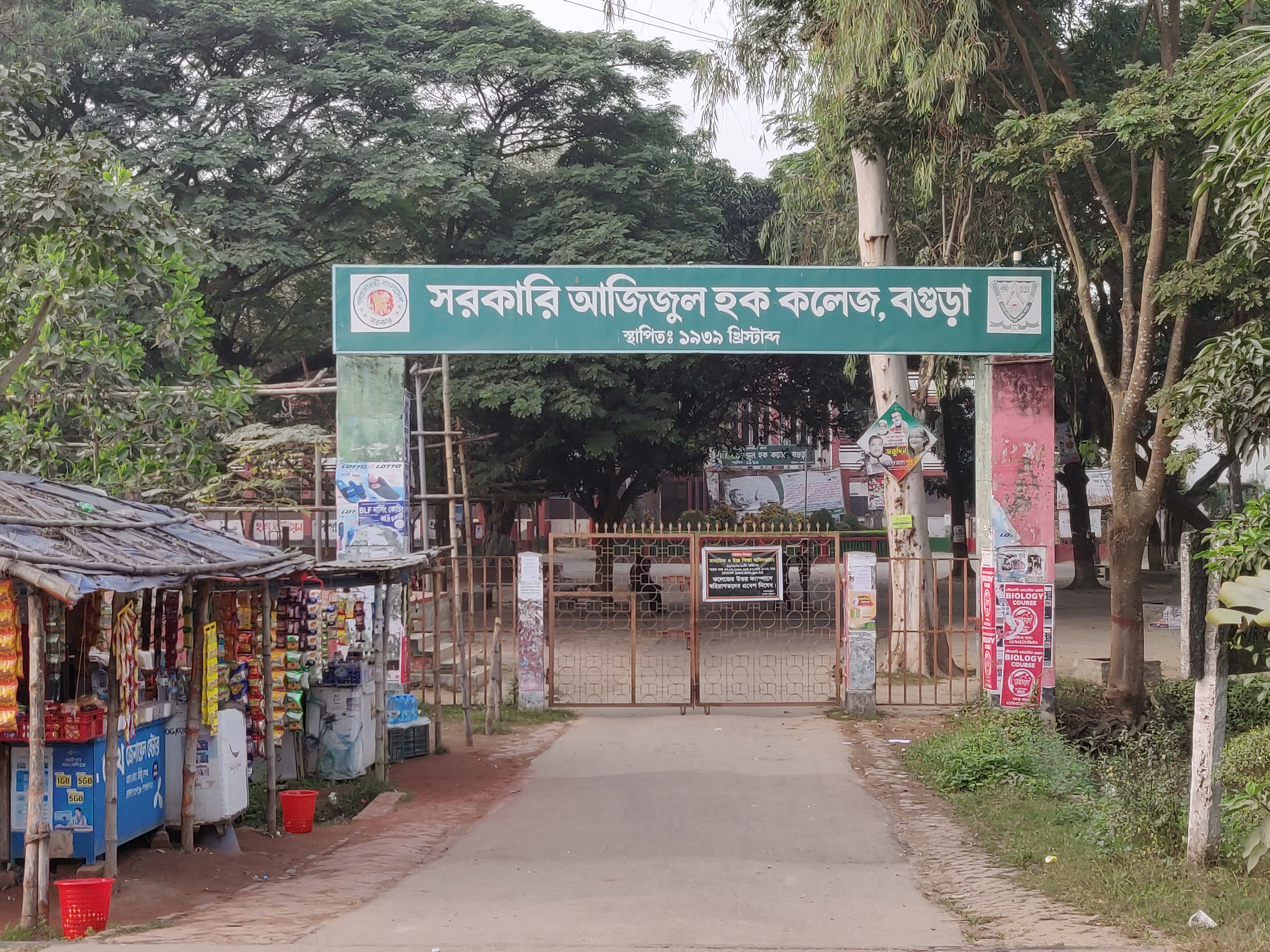
Entrance of Govt. Azizul Haque College (New campus)

After the government officialization in 1968, BA, B.Com, B.Sc, I.A., I.Com, I.Sc were introduced in Bengali, History, Islamic History and Culture and Economics along with Honours. In 1972–73, Honours classes were started in Arabic, Political Science, Chemistry, Physics, Mathematics and Accounting. Economics, Political Science, Management and Accounting were also introduced in Masters courses. In 1973–74, there were a total of 3,787 students including 317 and 618 in Masters and Honours respectively. There were total 90 teachers by that time.

Currently Masters Course have been newly launched in Marketing and Finance. This course is the only college in North Bengal to run Masters course. In marketing, the number of regular Masters seats is 100 and the number of irregular or private Masters seats is 400. Seats are selected through Honours CGPA.

== Academics ==
Degree, Honours and Masters classes are administered at the new residence of the college. The college offers 23 courses at the graduate level and 23 courses at the postgraduate level. Postgraduate diplomas in Information and Communication Technology (PGD in ICT) and Foreign Language Learning Courses are available.

== Campus ==
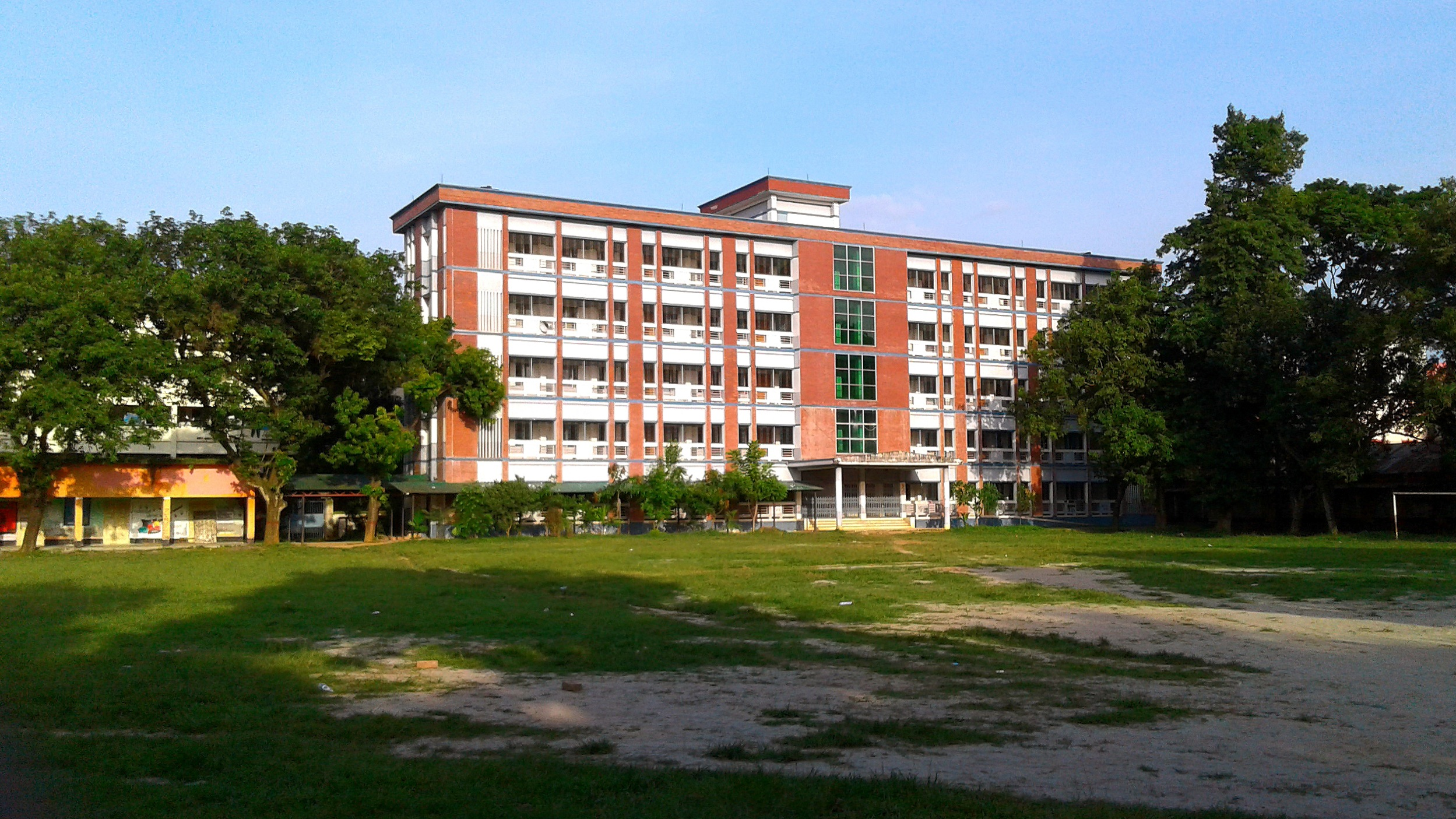
Intermediate Building of Govt. Azizul Haque College

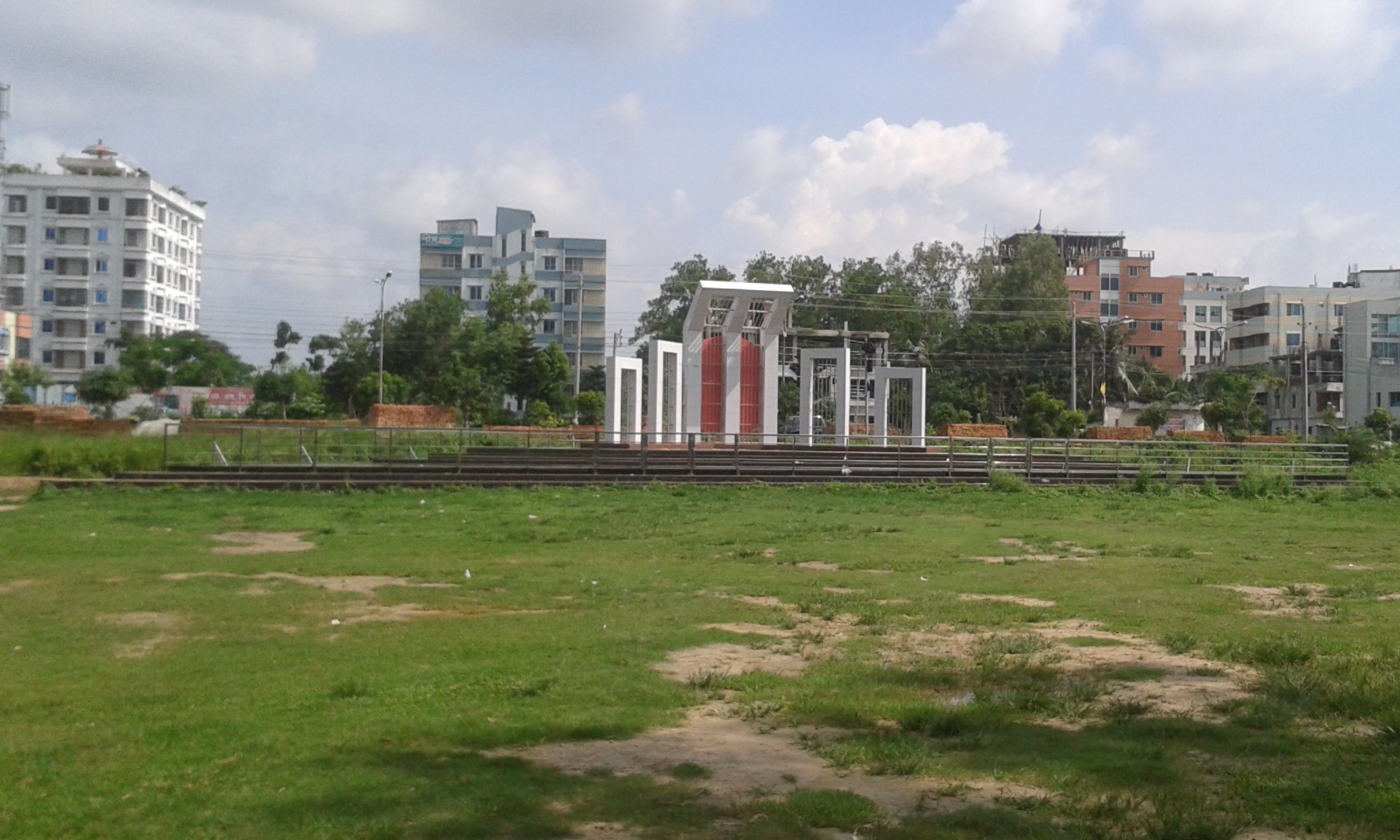
Shaheed Minar square, Govt. Azizul Haque College

There are three residential buildings for male students named Shahid Titumir Hall, Sher-E-Bangla Hall, Akhtar Ali Moon Hall, and one residential building for female students named Begum Rokeya Hall at the new residence. Unfortunately the three residential buildings for male students are closed since 2009. Due to a violent clash between Chhatra League and Chhatra Shibir on 20 December 2009, the college authorities had to shut down all the three male halls for an indefinite period. At present, the Begum Rokeya Hall is the only active dormitory among these. In addition, another new residential building has been built in 2018 for female students.

There is also a Shaheed Minar square and a memorial sculpture of Sir Azizul Haque inside the new residence of the college.

== Notable faculty ==
Notable faculty members of the college has included the linguist Muhammad Shahidullah and Bengali author, academic, scholar and linguist Syed Mujtaba Ali. Both of them have served as the Principal of this college.

== Notable alumni ==
Government Azizul Haque College has a rich history of alumni from its very beginning. Among them, some notable alumni are:

- Ataur Rahman, Bangladeshi poet and language activist
- Gaziul Haque, Bengali Language Movement activist
- Mahadev Saha, Bangladeshi poet
- Jyoti Prakash Dutta, Bangladeshi short-story writer
- Fashiur Rahman, Bangladeshi physician and retired major general
- Momtazur Rahman Tarafdar, Bangladeshi historian and academic
- Enamul Haque, Bangladeshi museologist
- Mostafa Alam Nannu, Bangladeshi physician and politician
- Habibar Rahman, Bangladeshi politician and former MP
