= S. M. Sirajul Islam Suruj =

Bangladeshi politician

Member of Bangladesh Parliament
- In office 1973–1979
- Succeeded by: Wajed Hossain Tarafdar

Personal details
- Party: Bangladesh Awami League

S. M. Sirajul Islam Suruj is a Bangladesh Awami League politician and a former member of parliament for Bogra-6.

== Career ==
Suruj was elected to parliament from Bogra-6 as a Bangladesh Awami League candidate in 1973. Following the 15 August 1975 Bangladesh coup d'état he was arrested. He was sentenced to four years imprisonment by a military court on 3 August 1975.
