= Abdus Salam (editor) =

Bangladeshi journalist

- Born: 2 August 1910; South Dharmapur, Chhagalnaiya, Feni, Bengal Presidency, British India
- Died: 13 February 1977 (aged 66)
- Occupation: Journalist

Abdus Salam (Bengali: আবদুস সালাম; 2 August 1910 – 13 February 1977) was a newspaper editor of Bangladesh. He edited The Pakistan Observer, which was renamed The Bangladesh Observer after the liberation of Bangladesh.

== Early life ==
Salam was born on 2 August 1910 in Dharmapur, Chhagalnaiya thana, Noakhali district (now in Feni District, Bangladesh). He graduated from Feni High School in 1926 and from Chittagong College in 1928. He completed his BA and MA from Presidency College Calcutta. After a brief period as a professor of English at Feni College, he served in many government departments during the British and Pakistan period, including Income Tax, Civil Supplies and Audit but left government service in 1949.

== Career ==
Salam was the editor of The Pakistan Observer from 1949 to 1972. There was a break in the distribution of the newspaper from 1952 to 1954, when it was banned by the government. Salam wrote an editorial in 1952 comparing the nepotism of one of the early caliphs with that of Prime Minister Khawaja Nazimuddin. The article was interpreted as blasphemous. In 1954, the balance of political power changed and the ban on The Pakistan Observer was lifted. Salam won a seat in the provincial parliament in the general elections from Feni North constituency as a candidate of United Front. On 18 December 1971, after the Bangladesh Liberation War, the paper was renamed The Observer and on 26 December 1971 was renamed to The Bangladesh Observer . On 15 March 1972 he published the article called The Supreme Test after the paper was nationalized in January 1972. He was replaced as editor by the government with Obaidul Haq. He was awarded an Ekushey Padak when it was first introduced in 1976.

== Death ==
Salam died on 13 February 1977.
