= Md. Shahjahan Ali Talukder =

Bangladeshi politician (died 2020)

- শাহজাহান আলী তালুকদার

Member of Parliament for Bogra-5
- In office 15 April 1988 – 6 December 1990
- Preceded by: Ferdous Zaman Mukul
- Succeeded by: Golam Mohammad Siraj

Personal details
- Died: 28 June 2020 (aged 65) Dhaka, Bangladesh
- Party: Jatiya Party

Md. Shahjahan Ali Talukder (1954/1955 – 28 June 2020) was a Bangladeshi politician and a Jatiya Sangsad member representing the Bogra-5 constituency winning the 1988 Bangladeshi general election.

== Career ==
Talukder was a lawyer. He was a president of Bogra District Jatiya Party and a member of the Central Committee of the party.

Talukder died from COVID-19 complications during the COVID-19 pandemic in Bangladesh in Dhaka on 28 June 2020.
