= Khaleda Panna =

Bangladeshi politician

Member of Bangladesh Parliament
- In office 2005–2006
- Preceded by: Kamrun Nahar Putul

Personal details
- Party: Bangladesh Nationalist Party

Khaleda Panna is a Bangladesh Nationalist Party politician and a former member of parliament from a reserved seat.

== Career ==
Panna was elected to parliament from reserved seat as a Bangladesh Nationalist Party candidate in 2005. She was a lawyer of the Bangladesh Supreme Court.

== Death ==
Panna died in November 2020 due to severe COVID symptoms in PG hospital.
