= The Man Behind the Plough =

Book by Azizul Haque

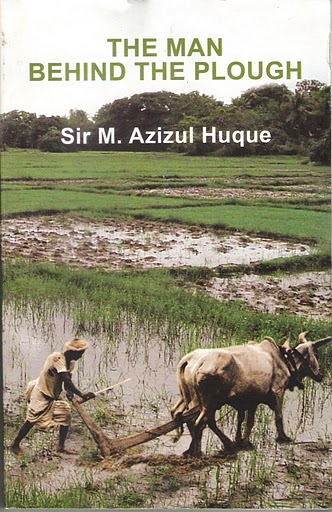
- Author: Sir M.Azizul Haque
- Language: English
- Subject: Agriculture, Economic Conditions, Peasantry
- Genre: Treatise
- Publisher: The Book Company Ltd, Calcutta / Aliah University Press
- Publication date: 1939
- Publication place: India
- Media type: Print (Hardcover)
- Pages: 299 (Second Edition)

The Man Behind the Plough is a wide-ranging, in-depth and moving study of the endemic problems and tragic suffering of the peasants of the undivided Bengal. In order to go into the roots of these problems, the author Sir M. Azizul Haque examines the land system introduced by the Permanent Settlement (1793), contrasts it with what prevailed during the Mughal era and throws light on how the zamindars’ lobby distorted the original intention of the regulations of 1793 with disastrous consequences. The author has made use of extensive facts, archival material and statistics to establish his interpretations and conclusions. It is a research work of very high quality, and may be regarded as what is now called an interdisciplinary work. The author put in ten years of labour of love, albeit very hard labour, to produce the book, which aims to look into the problems of agriculture “from the point of view of the peasant”.

== About the author ==
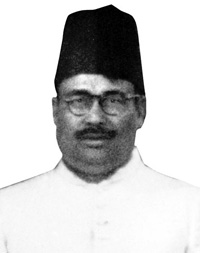
A Picture of the author Sir Mohammad Azizul Haque (1892-1947)

M.Azizul Haque was quite well known in the political and intellectual circles as a multi –faceted person in undivided Bengal. He rose to prominence as the Speaker of Bengal Legislative Assembly and earned reputation as the Vice- Chancellor of Calcutta University during the most turbulent days of Bengal Politics.He of, course, established his position as noted author of a book entitled “The Man Behind the Plough”. Sir Mohammad Azizul Haque was born on 27 November 1892 at Shantipur in Nadia district of West Bengal. He began legal practice in Krishnanagar in 1915. He was elected Chairman of Krishnanagar Municipality in 1933. He became Minister of Education in 1934. In 1942, he was appointed the High Commissioner for India in the United Kingdom. In 1943, he returned to India and joined the Viceroy's Executive Council, in May, as the member in charge of the Department of Commerce, Food, Industries and Civil supplies. Mohammad Azizul Haque was conferred D L:itt ( Honoris Causa) by the University of Calcutta. He was made Khan Bahadur in 1926, awarded the CIE in 1937, and knighted in 1941. But in support of the protest call given by the Muslim League against the Viceroy's actions, he renounced all titles bestowed on him by the British Government on 16 August 1946. He died at his Calcutta residence on 22 March 1947.

== Author’s say ==
“Agriculture is the occupation of the bulk of the rural population of Bengal and on it depends the welfare of the province as a whole. An attempt has been made in this book to study the problems of land and agriculture in this province, to lay bare the economic facts of rural life to-day and to discuss some of the primary problems concerning the condition of the Bengal peasantry…In all humility, I place this book before all who are devoted to the cause of the “raiyat” of Bengal, all who wish him well and all who wish to know the tragic realities of the man behind the plough.

== About the book ==
His book The Man behind the Plough(1939) is a research work of high esteem and great quality. His concern for the Bengal farmers' miserable life goes far back to his years as a young lawyer when he championed their cause. He made a special study of the irrigation problem of Bengal. It is written about the problems and plight of the Peasants of Bengal. His concern for the poor, exploited peasants of Bengal led to the writing of the present book first published in 1939. Rabindranath Tagore himself greatly appreciated this book and invited him to grace the chair of Chief Guest at the Annual Convocation of Shantiniketan.

== Criticism ==
The study examines the socio-economic conditions of Bengal's peasantry. Although statutory land reforms including the abolition of the zamindari system and agricultural legislation were enacted following its initial publication, research indicates that the economic conditions of agricultural laborers remained largely unchanged. The work proposes agricultural diversification, infrastructure improvements, and gradual industrialization to reduce reliance on arable land.

== External sources ==
- Delhi University, Digital Library "The Man Behind the Plough"
- Aliah University Press Release
- Open Library
- Letter written by Rabindranath Tagore to Sir M. Azizul Haque (p. 8)
