= Wajed Hossain Tarafdar =

Bangladeshi politician

Member of the Bangladesh Parliament for Bogra-6
- In office 1979–1986
- Preceded by: S. M. Sirajul Islam Suruj
- Succeeded by: Abdur Rahman Fakir

Personal details
- Born: 1932 Dighalkandi, Sariakandi thana, British India
- Party: Bangladesh Nationalist Party

Wajed Hossain Tarafdar was a Bangladesh Nationalist Party politician and a member of parliament for Bogra-6.

== Biography ==
Wajed Hossain Tarafdar was born in 1932 in Dighalkandi village of what is now Sariakandi Upazila, Bogra District, Bangladesh. He graduated from Sariakandi Government High School in 1949.

Tarafdar was elected to parliament from Bogra-6 as a Bangladesh Nationalist Party candidate in 1979.

He died before 2017.
