= Rezaul Karim Badsha =

Bangladeshi politician

- রেজাউল করিম বাদশা

Member of the Bangladesh Parliament for Bogra-6
- Incumbent
- Assumed office 9 April 2026
- Preceded by: Ragebul Ahsan Ripu

Personal details
- Born: Md. Rezaul Karim Badsha; 6 July 1959 (age 67) Bogra
- Party: Bangladesh Nationalist Party

Rezaul Karim Badsha (born 6 July 1959) is a Bangladeshi politician. He is a member of parliament representing the Bogra-6 constituency.

== Early life ==
Rezaul Karim Badsha was born on 6 July 1959, in Shibati, Bogra. His father's name is Md. Shah Alam and his mother's name is Jahanara Begum.

== Political career ==
Tarique Rahman stood for two seats in the 2026 Bangladeshi general election, Bogra-6 and Dhaka-17. After winning both, he chose to represent Dhaka-17 and quit Bogra-6, triggering a by-election. Rezaul Karim Badsha was elected as a member of parliament in the April 2026 by-election. He previously served as the president of Bogra District Bangladesh Nationalist Party.
