= Azizul Haque (educator) =

Indian lawyer and Muslim activist

Khan Bahadur Sir Sir Azizul Haque KCSI CIE
- মোহাম্মদ আজিজুল হক
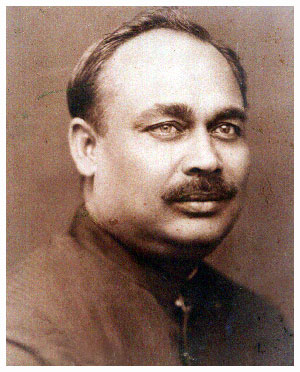

High Commissioner of India to the United Kingdom
- In office December 1941 – May 1943
- Preceded by: Feroz Khan Noon
- Succeeded by: S. E. Runganadhan

Vice-Chancellor of the University of Calcutta
- In office 1938–1942
- Preceded by: Syama Prasad Mukherjee
- Succeeded by: Bidhan Chandra Roy

Speaker of the Bengal Legislative Assembly
- In office 1937–1946
- Succeeded by: Nurul Amin (as Speaker); Mullah Abdul Halim (for constituency)
- Constituency: Nadia West

Education Minister of Bengal
- In office 1934–1937

Member of the Bengal Legislative Council
- In office 1926–1930

Personal details
- Born: 27 November 1892 Shantipur, Nadia district, Bengal Presidency, British India
- Died: March 23, 1947 (aged 54) Calcutta, Bengal Presidency, British India
- Spouse: Kaniz Khatun
- Parent: Mohammad Mozammel Huq (father)
- Occupation: Advocate, diplomat

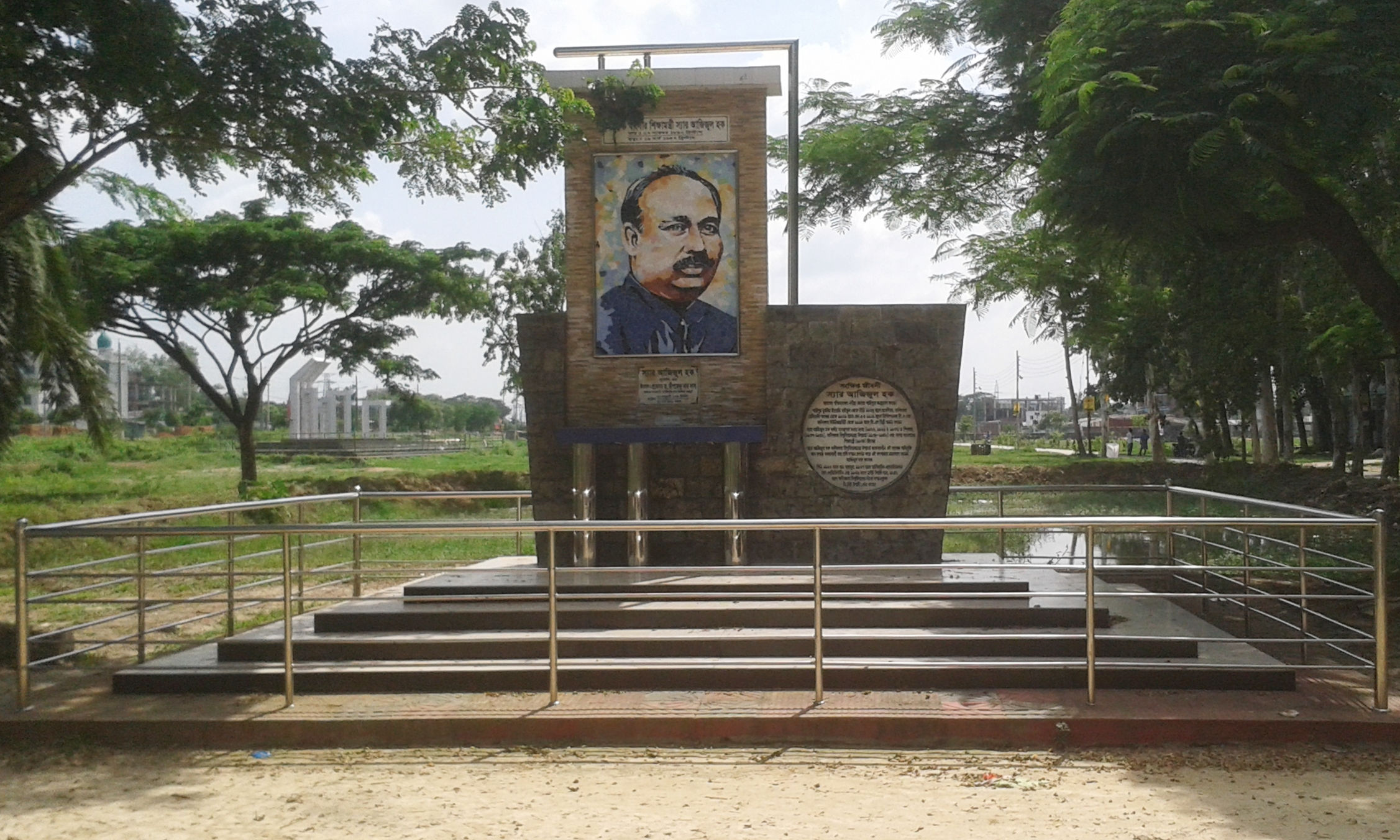
A memorial dedicated to Haque at the Azizul Haque College in Bangladesh.

Sir Muhammad Azizul Haque, KCSI, CIE (27 November 1892 – 23 March 1947), also known as Muhammad Azizul Huq or Mohammad Azizul Huque, was a Bengali lawyer, writer, educator and public servant. He studied at Presidency College and University Law College in Calcutta. He worked to better the condition of Muslim people, primarily in the rural farmlands. This led him to work with Sher-e-Bangla A.K. Fazlul Haque, Sir Abdulla Suhrawardy, Sir Salimullah and Muhammad Ali Jinnah. He remained friends with many throughout his life.

He served, from 1926, on the Bengal Legislative Council, as Education minister for Bengal (1934–1937), as the speaker of the Bengal Legislative Assembly (1937–1942), as the vice-chancellor of Calcutta University (1938–1942), as the High Commissioner for India in the United Kingdom (December 1941 – May 1943), and as the member in charge, on the Viceroy's Executive Council, of the Department of Commerce, Food, Industries and Civil supplies (May 1943 – 1945).

== Early life and education ==
Azizul Haque was born on 27 November 1892, to a Bengali Muslim family in Shantipur, located in the Nadia district of the erstwhile Bengal Presidency. His father, Mohammad Mozammel Huq, is a renowned Bengali poet and author. His grandfather, Nasiruddin Ahmad, and paternal family were originally from the village of Baweegachi, not far from Shantipur town. Haque studied at the Shantipur Muslim School, and passed his matriculation in 1907. He graduated from the University of Calcutta initially with a Bachelor of Arts, and later a Bachelor of Laws degree.

== Career ==
He started his career with a government job in 1914, and found employment as a Deputy Magistrate. The following year, he became a lawyer at the Judge Court in Krishnanagar, Nadia. Not long after, he was appointed as the Public Prosecutor of the District of Nadia. In 1926, he became the vice-chairman of the Nadia District Board. In 1928, he was made a fellow of the University of Calcutta and member of the Dacca University Court. He published an article titled A Plea for Separate Electorate in Bengal in protest to the Nehru Report of 1931. In the same year, he was nominated as a member of the Indian Franchise Commission. He became a member of the Bengal Banking Enquiry Commission, Bengal Retrenchment Committee and Bengal Board of Economic Enquiry in 1932. Haque has also been a part of the Railway Advisory Committee and worked with the Public Accounts Committee of the Bengal Legislative Council. He later became the vice-president of the Bengal Board of Industries.

In 1933, Haque became the chairman of the Krishnanagar Municipality. He left the District Board in 1934, as he had then become a member of the Bengal Legislative Council and the Minister of Education in Bengal. It was Haque that was the first to introduce Free Universal Primary Education Bill. Among his other activities were the establishment of new schools, and better administration of schools in both urban and rural areas. He was also responsible for the registration and waqf as a minister, as well as distribution of food. He also played a role in changing the medium of education from only English to Bengali. Following the 1937 legislative elections, Haque became a member of the Bengal Legislative Assembly, and also served as its Speaker for the first five years.

Haque became the second Muslim to be appointed as the Vice-Chancellor of the University of Calcutta in 1938. He was appointed again in 1940, thus serving as vice-chancellor for two terms, ending in 1942. His contributions included the introduction of a new Islamic studies curriculum and the establishment of the School of Islamic History and Culture. Haque worked with the Kamal Yar Jung Education Committee, and began researching about issues pertaining to Muslim education across the British Raj from 1939 to 1941. His report presented a comprehensive educational plan that would support the cultures of the Muslims.

He was appointed as the High Commissioner of India to the United Kingdom in December 1941. He returned to Bengal in May 1943 and became a member of the Governor-General's Executive Council, first under Lord Linlithgow and then under Lord Wavell. He was responsible for the departments of commerce, industries, civil supplies and food. He was later given the responsibility of the textiles office of the supplies department.

== Awards and recognition ==
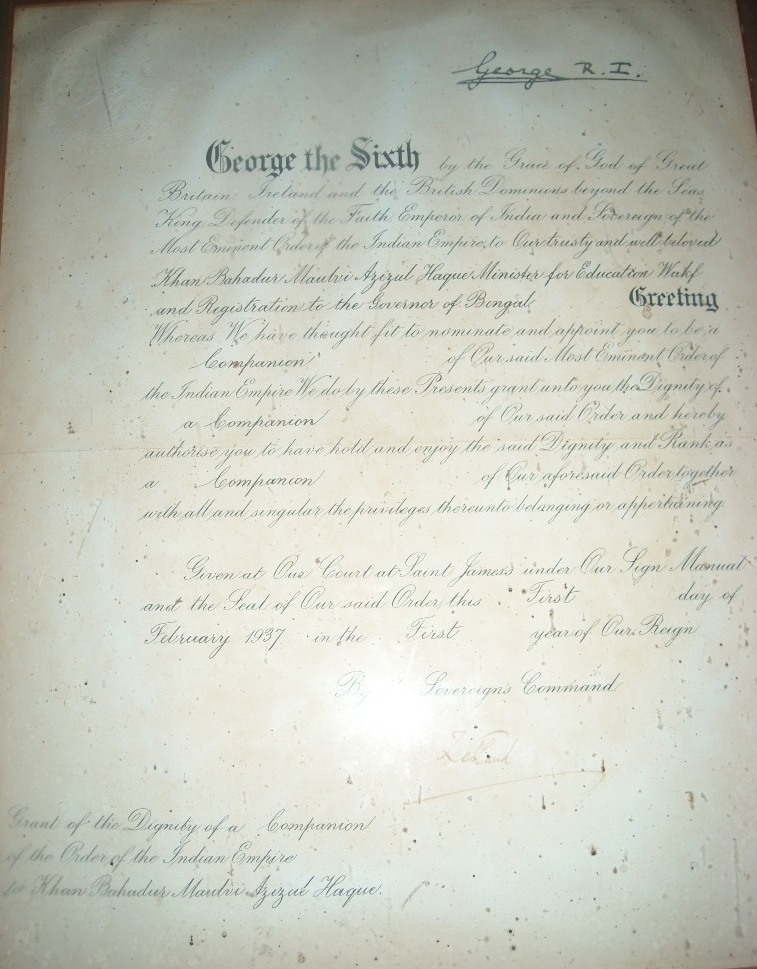
Sir Azizul Haque, Order of the Indian Empire Certificate.

On 4 April 1938, the Azizul Haque College in Bogra was established in his name by Khan Bahadur Muhammad Ali and Moulvi Abdus Sattar. The University of Calcutta has awarded him with a Doctor of Letters.

Haque was conferred the title of Khan Bahadur by the British Raj, appointed a CIE in 1937 knighted in the 1941 New Year Honours List, and appointed a KCSI in the 1946 Birthday Honours List. He subsequently renounced his British honours in protest against the government, on 16 August 1946.

== Death ==
He died due to brain haemorrhage at his residence in Calcutta on 23 March 1947.

== Major works ==
Haque's literary works include:

1. History and Problems of Moslem Education in Bengal (1917)
2. Education and Retrenchment (1924)
3. The Man behind the Plough (1939)
4. The Sword of the Crescent Moon
5. Cultural Contributions of Islam to Indian History
6. A Plea for Separate Electorate in Bengal (1931)
