= Nurul Islam Omar =

Bangladeshi politician

Member of Parliament

Personal details
- Party: Jatiya Party

Nurul Islam Omar (Bengali: মোঃ নূরুল ইসলাম ওমর) is a Bangladeshi politician and the former Member of Parliament from Bogra-6.

== Early life ==
Omar was born on 13 January 1955. He has a B.A. degree.

== Career ==
Omar was elected to Parliament from Bogra-6 as a Jatiya Party candidate in 2014.
