= Abdur Rahman Fakir =

Bangladeshi politician

Member of Bangladesh Parliament
- In office 1986–1988
- Preceded by: Wajed Hossain Tarafdar
- Succeeded by: Saifur Rahman Bhandari

Personal details
- Party: Bangladesh Jamaat-e-Islami

Abdur Rahman Fakir is a Bangladesh Jamaat-e-Islami politician and a former member of parliament for Bogra-6.

== Career ==
Fakir was elected to parliament from Bogra-6 as a Bangladesh Jamaat-e-Islami candidate in 1986.
