= Mostafizur Rahman Patal =

Bangladeshi politician

Member of the Bangladesh Parliament for Bogra-5
- In office 7 April 1973 – November 1974
- Preceded by: Position created
- Succeeded by: Md. Sirajul Huq Talukder

Personal details
- Died: November 1974
- Party: Bangladesh Awami League
- Spouse: Kamrun Nahar Putul

Mostafizur Rahman Patal was a Bangladesh Awami League politician and a member of parliament for Bogra-5.

== Career ==
Patal was elected to parliament from Bogra-5 as a Bangladesh Awami League candidate in 1973.

== Death ==
Patal was assassinated in November 1974. His wife, Begum Kamrunnahar Putul, served as a member of parliament from women's reserved seat as a candidate of the Awami League.
