= Ferdous Zaman Mukul =

Bangladeshi politician

Member of Bangladesh Parliament
- In office 1986–1988
- Preceded by: Md. Sirajul Huq Talukder
- Succeeded by: Md. Shahjahan Ali Talukder

Personal details
- Party: Bangladesh Awami League

Ferdous Zaman Mukul is a Bangladesh Awami League politician and a former member of parliament for Bogra-5.

== Career ==
Mukul was elected to parliament from Bogra-5 as a Bangladesh Awami League candidate in 1986.

== Death ==
Mukul died on 4 November 2012 in Bogra District, Bangladesh.
