= Md. Sirajul Huq Talukder =

Bangladeshi politician

Member of Bangladesh Parliament
- In office 1979–1981
- Preceded by: Mostafizur Rahman Patal
- Succeeded by: Ferdous Zaman Mukul

Personal details
- Party: Bangladesh Nationalist Party

Md. Sirajul Huq Talukder was a Bangladesh Nationalist Party politician and a member of parliament for Bogra-5.

== Career ==
Talukder was elected to the East Pakistan State Assembly in 1954 as a Muslim League candidate. He was elected to parliament from Bogra-5 as a Bangladesh Nationalist Party candidate in 1979.

== Death ==
Talukder died on 21 September 1981 in Bangabandhu Sheikh Mujib Medical University, Dhaka, Bangladesh.
