= Bogra-6 =

Constituency of Bangladesh's Jatiya Sangsad

Coordinates: 24.85°N 89.37°E

Bogura-6
- Constituency for the Jatiya Sangsad
- District: Bogura District
- Division: Rajshahi Division
- Electorate: 454,043 (Feb 2026)

Current constituency
- Created: 1973
- Party: Bangladesh Nationalist Party
- Member: Rezaul Karim Badsha
- ← 40 Bogra-5 42 Bogra-7 →

Bogura-6 is a constituency represented in the Jatiya Sangsad (National Parliament) of Bangladesh since 2026 by Rezaul Karim Badsha of the Bangladesh Nationalist Party.

== Boundaries ==
The constituency encompasses Bogra Sadar Upazila.

== History ==
The constituency was created for the first general elections in newly independent Bangladesh, held in 1973.

== Members of Parliament ==
Election	Member	Party
1973	Sirajul Islam Suruj	Awami League
1979	Wajed Hossain Tarafdar	Bangladesh Nationalist Party
Major Boundary Changes
1986	Abdur Rahman Fakir	Bangladesh Jamaat-e-Islami
1988	Saifur Rahman Bhandari	Independent
1991	Mojibar Rahman	Bangladesh Nationalist Party
Sep 1996 by-election	Md. Zahurul Islam	Bangladesh Nationalist Party
2001	Khaleda Zia	Bangladesh Nationalist Party
Apr 2009 by-election	Jamiruddin Sarkar	Bangladesh Nationalist Party
2014	Nurul Islam Omar	Jatiya Party (Ershad)
2018	Mirza Fakhrul Islam Alamgir	Bangladesh Nationalist Party
2019 by-election	Golam Mohammad Siraj	Bangladesh Nationalist Party
2023 by-election	Ragebul Ahsan Ripu	Awami League
2026	Tarique Rahman	Bangladesh Nationalist Party
2026 by-election	Rezaul Karim Badsha	Bangladesh Nationalist Party

== Elections ==
=== Elections in the 2020s ===
Tarique Rahman stood for two seats in the 2026 general election, and won two of them: Bogra-6 and Dhaka-17. He chose to represent Dhaka-17 and quit Bogra-6, triggering a by-election. Rezaul Karim Badsha of the BNP was elected in an April 2026 by-election.

By-election 2026: Bogra-6
Party	Candidate	Votes	%	±%
BNP	Rezaul Karim Badsha	133,215		
Jamaat	Md. Abidur Rahman Sohel	56,904		
Majority				
Turnout			42.49	
Registered electors		450,307		
BNP hold				

General Election 2026: Bogra-6
Party	Candidate	Votes	%	±%
BNP	Tarique Rahman	216,284	68.90	N/A
Jamaat	Md. Abidur Rahman Sohel	97,626	31.10	N/A
Majority		118,658	37.80	N/A
Turnout		322,504	71.03	N/A
Registered electors		454,043		
BNP gain from AL				

=== Elections in the 2010s ===
By-election 2019: Bogra-6
Party	Candidate	Votes	%	±%
BNP	Golam Mohammad Siraj	89,742	66.99	N/A
AL	T Zaman Niketa	32,297	24.12	N/A
JP(E)	Nurul Islam Omar	8,831	6.59	N/A
Majority		57,445	42.87	N/A
Turnout		133,870	34.55	N/A
Registered electors		387,458		
BNP hold				

General Election 2018: Bogra-6
Party	Candidate	Votes	%	±%
BNP	Mirza Fakhrul Islam Alamgir	205,987	53.20	N/A
JP(E)	Nurul Islam Omar	39,961	10.32	N/A
Majority		166,026	42.88	N/A
Turnout		245,948	63.5	N/A
Registered electors		387,458		
BNP gain from JP(E)				

Nurul Islam Omar was elected unopposed in the 2014 general election after opposition parties withdrew their candidacies in a boycott of the election.

=== Elections in the 2000s ===
Khaleda Zia stood for three seats in the 2008 general election: Bogra-6, Bogra-7, and Feni-1. After winning all three, she chose to represent Feni-1 and quit the other two, triggering by-elections in them. Muhammad Jamiruddin Sircar of the BNP was elected in an April 2009 by-election.

General Election 2008: Bogra-6
Party	Candidate	Votes	%	±%
BNP	Khaleda Zia	193,792	71.6	−7.0
AL	Momtaz Uddin	74,634	27.6	+8.7
IAB	A. N. M. Mamunur Rashid	1,336	0.5	N/A
BDB	Abdullah al Woaky	627	0.2	N/A
BSD	Md. Saifuzzaman	297	0.1	N/A
Majority		119,158	44.0	
Turnout		270,686	86.6	
BNP hold				

General Election 2001: Bogra-6
Party	Candidate	Votes	%	±%
BNP	Khaleda Zia	227,355	78.6	+19.7
AL	Md. Mahbubul Alam	54,777	18.9	+3.1
IAB	A. N. M. Mamunur Rashid	4,745	1.6	N/A
CPB	Md. Abdur Razzak	1,513	0.5	N/A
BKA	Md. Safiqul Hasan	467	0.2	N/A
BSD	Md. Saifuzzaman Tutul	294	0.1	N/A
Jatiya Party (M)	Syed Akil Ahmed	267	0.1	N/A
Majority		172,578	59.6	+35.9
Turnout		289,418	76.4	−1.8
BNP hold				

=== Elections in the 1990s ===
Khaleda Zia stood for five seats in the June 1996 general election: Bogra-6, Bogra-7, Feni-1, Lakshmipur-2 and Chittagong-1. After winning all five, she chose to represent Feni-1 and quit the other four, triggering by-elections in them. Md. Zahurul Islam of the BNP was elected in a September 1996 by-election.

General Election June 1996: Bogra-6
Party	Candidate	Votes	%	±%
BNP	Khaleda Zia	136,669	58.9	+4.2
Jamaat	Golam Rabbani	46,917	20.2	−7.1
AL	Md. Mahmudul Hassan	36,747	15.8	−0.1
JP(E)	A. H. Golam Zakaria Khan	10,185	4.4	+3.9
Independent	Md. Alberuni	649	0.3	N/A
JSD	AKM Rezaul Karim Tansen	310	0.1	N/A
Islamic Al Zihad Dal	Abu Nosor Md. Shohidullah	288	0.1	N/A
FP	M. L. Alam	175	0.1	N/A
Independent	M. R. Renu	135	0.1	N/A
Majority		89,752	38.7	+11.3
Turnout		232,075	78.2	+13.8
BNP hold				

General Election 1991: Bogra-6
Party	Candidate	Votes	%	±%
BNP	Mojibar Rahman	96,234	54.7	
Jamaat	Golam Rabbani	48,086	27.3	
AL	Momtaz Uddin	27,964	15.9	
IOJ	Abdu Kader Prang	943	0.5	
JP(E)	A. B. M. Shahzahan	896	0.5	
Zaker Party	A. T. M. Zakaria	891	0.5	
CPB	Md. Abdur Razzak	823	0.5	
JSD	Ashis Sarker	195	0.1	
Majority		48,148	27.4	
Turnout		176,032	64.4	
BNP gain from Independent				
