= Gaziul Haque =

Bangladeshi activist

- গাজীউল হক
- Born: 13 February 1929; Nichintapur, Chhagalnaiya, Feni District, Bengal Presidency, British India
- Died: 17 June 2009 (aged 80)
- Education: MA, LLB
- Alma mater: University of Dhaka

Abu Naser Muhammad Gaziul Haque (13 February 1929 – 17 June 2009) was a language activist and an activist leader during the Bengali language movement.

== Early life and education ==
Haque was born in Nichintapur village of Chhagalnaiya Upazila in Feni district to Nurjahan Begum and Sirajul Haque. He got his early education from Kashipur School, and completed his matriculation examination from Bogura Zilla School in 1946. He passed intermediate of arts examination from Azizul Haque College in 1948. He completed his bachelor's and masters' in history from the University of Dhaka in 1951 and 1952 respectively and LLB degree from the same university in 1956.

Next year in September he joined the Democracy Summit in Dhaka. He was the chairman of the procession of a news published in the English daily Morning News.

== Career ==
Since his early days, Haque was involved in different progressive movements. He was arrested in 1942 for replacing a Union Jack with a Muslim League flag flying on a government building in Ramna. In 1944, he was elected a president of Bengali Muslim Chhatra League of Bogra District. He led a procession in the University of Dhaka campus in protest of the statement of the then chief minister Khwaja Nazimuddin on 30 January 1952 on the language issue. Haque presided over the historic Amtala meeting held on 21 February 1952. The decision to violate section 144 of the criminal procedure code was taken in realizing the demand for making Bengali a state language of Pakistan. The action led to Language Movement Day.

Haque was imprisoned in 1953, 1954 and 1975 for various causes.

In April 1971, he along with 27 freedom fighters attacked the Aria Cantonment in North Bengal and liberated it. The battle is also known as Chili-fight.

Haque was a regular member of the Awami League Advisory Committee and also one of the founders of Ekattorer Ghatak Dalal Nirmul Committee. He was also the chairman of Press Institute of Bangladesh (PIB) and Bogra Hamdard Unani Medical College and Hospital.

== Works ==
- Jeler Kabita (1969)
- Ebarer Sangram Swadhinatar Sangram(1971)
- Egiye Cholo (1971)
- Bangladesh Unchained (1971)
- Media Laws and Regulations in Bangladesh (1992)
- Muhammad Sultan (1994)
- Bangladesh-er Gena Medhaym Ain o Bidhimala (1996)
- Uchcha Adalate Bangla (2003)

== Awards ==
- Pabna Theatre Prize (1977)
- State Language Padak (1993)
- Bhasha Sainik Padak (1997)
- Sipep Gold medal (1999)
- Bangla Academy Fellowship (1999)
- Bishwa Bangali Conference Prize (2000)
- Ekushey Padak (2000)
- Jahanara Imam Padak (2001)
- Bangabandhu Padak (2003)
- Sher-e-Bangla National Award (2004)

The University of Dhaka conferred him the Honoris Causa Doctorate of Laws degree in 2008
