= Ataur Rahman (poet) =

Bangladeshi poet

- আতাউর রহমান
- Born: 1925; Akkelpur, Bengal Presidency, British India
- Died: 1999 (aged 73–74); Rajshahi, Bangladesh
- Education: University of Dhaka
- Occupation: Poet
- Awards: full list

Ataur Rahman (1925–1999) was a Bangladeshi poet. He was awarded Bangla Academy Literary Award in 1970.

== Early life ==
Poet Ataur Rahman was born on May 8, 1927, in Akkelpur, now in Joypurhat district. He completed his early education at Sonamukhi High School, Akkelpur, and then attended Azizul Haque College, Bogura. In 1949, he earned a Bachelor's degree from Surendranath College, Kolkata, followed by a degree in Bengali language and literature from the University of Dhaka in 1952. Ataur Rahman developed a passion for writing at a young age, with his first poem, "Aslo Khushir Eid," published while he was in seventh grade.

== Career ==
He started teaching at Gafargaon College in Mymensingh district in 1953. He later taught at various institutions, including Azizul Haque College in Bogura, Maulana Mohammad Ali College in Santosh, Alek Mahmud College in Jamalpur, and Edward College in Pabna. In 1973, he joined the Bengali Department of Rajshahi University as a professor, where he continued to teach until his death.

== Works ==
- Dui Ritu (1956)
- Ekdin Pratidin (1963)
- Nisad Nagare Achhi (1977)
- Bhalobasa Chirashatru (1981)
- Idaning Rabgamavcha (1992)
- Sarata Jiban Dhare (1994)
- Bhalobasa O Tarpar
- Kavi Nazrul (1968)
- Nazrul Kavya Samiksa (1972)
- Nazrul Jibane Prem O Bibaha (1997)

== Awards ==
- Bangla Academy Literary Award (1970)
- Sher-e-Bangla National Award
- Nazrul Memorial Prize (1985)
- Hilali Memorial Prize (1987)
