= Ekushey Padak =

Second highest civilian award in Bangladesh

Ekushey Padak একুশে পদক
- Type: National Civilian
- Country: Bangladesh
- Presented by: Government of Bangladesh
- Ribbon
- Established: 1976
- First award: 1976
- Final award: 2026
- Website: http://www.moca.gov.bd/

Precedence
- Next (higher): Independence Award

Ekushey Padak (Note: Bengali: একুশে পদক, romanized: Ekuśe Pôdôk, pronounced [ˈekuˌʃe ˈpɔdok]; lit. 'Medal of the Twenty-first') (Bengali: একুশে পদক lit. "Medal of the 21st") is the second highest civilian award in Bangladesh, introduced in memory of those killed by Pakistani authorities in the Bengali language movement of 1952. It is given in fields including culture, education, and economics. The Ministry of Cultural Affairs administers the award.

The award consists of an 18-carat gold medal weighing 3 tolas, a certificate of honour and a cash award. The medal was designed by the artist Nitun Kundu. The amount of the cash reward was originally ৳ 25,000, but it was increased to ৳ 100,000 in 2015, to ৳ 200,000 in 2017 and to ৳ 400,000 as of November 2019.

Cabinet ministries and prior winners submit nominees, and the National Committee on Citizenship and Cultural Affairs chooses finalists, of whom those approved by the prime minister receive the award.

The name Ekushey refers to 21 February 1952, commemorated as Language Movement Day and International Mother Language Day, when students campaigning for official status of the Bengali language within Pakistan were killed by law enforcement.

== Fields ==
The Ekushey Padak is awarded to Bangladeshi citizens and various organizations who have played an outstanding role and contribution to the development and progress of Bangladesh in ten fields: Bengali language movement, liberation war, education, literature, art, research, economics, journalism, science and technology, and social service.

=== Ekushey Padak in Art ===
Ekushey Padak in Art (Bengali: শিল্পকলায় একুশে পদক) is given for music, charisma, dance, drama and films of Bangladesh.

It was first given in 1976.

=== Ekushey Padak in Economics ===
Ekushey Padak in Economics (Bengali: অর্থনীতিতে একুশে পদক) was first given in 2018.

=== Ekushey Padak in Education ===
Ekushey Padak in Education (Bengali: শিক্ষায় একুশে পদক) was first given in 1976.

=== Ekushey Padak in Journalism ===
Ekushey Padak in Journalism (Bengali: সাংবাদিকতায় একুশে পদক) is given to recognize the unique contribution of journalism. In 1976, for the first time, Ekushey Padak was introduced in the beginning Tofazzal Hossain Manik Miah, Abul Kalam Shamsuddin and Abdus Salam Ekushey Padak in Journalism was given.

=== Ekushey Padak in Language Movement ===
Ekushey Padak in Language Movement (Bengali: ভাষা আন্দোলনে একুশে পদক) is one of the main fields of the Ekushey Padak. It is a national given to recognize the contribution of Bangla Language Movement in 1952. In 2000 Language Martyr Barkat, Language Martyr Jabbar, Language Martyr Salam, Language Martyr Rafiq, Language Martyr Shafiur and language soldier Gaziul Haque for the first time was given Ekushey Padak in the Language Movement.

=== Ekushey Padak in War of Liberation ===
Ekushey Padak in War of Liberation (Bengali: মুক্তিযুদ্ধে একুশে পদক) is one of the main fields of the Ekushey Padak. It is a national given to recognize the contribution of 1971's Bangladesh Liberation War. In 2013, Social Welfare Minister Enamul Haque Mostafa Shahid For the first time, Ekushey Padak was given in Liberation War.

=== Ekushey Padak in Literature ===
Ekushey Padak in Literature (Bengali: সাহিত্যে একুশে পদক) is given to people belonging to literature in Bengali language to give recognition to their unique contribution. In 1976, for the first time, Ekushey Padak was introduced in the beginning Kazi Nazrul Islam, Natyaguru Nurul Momen, Jasim Uddin, Abdul Quadir and Sufia Kamal Ekushey Padak in Literature was given.

=== Ekushey Padak in Research ===
Ekushey Padak in Research (Bengali: গবেষণায় একুশে পদক) is given to recognize the unique contribution of Research of Bangladesh. In 2003, for the first time, Ekushey Padak was introduced in the beginning Abdul Mannan Syed Ekushey Padak in Research was given.

=== Ekushey Padak in Science and Technology ===
Ekushey Padak in Science and Technology (Bengali: বিজ্ঞান ও প্রযুক্তিতে একুশে পদক) is given by the Government of Bangladesh. This award given to the recognize the unique contributions in science and technology by Bangladeshi citizens. In 2000, for the first time, Ekushey Padak was introduced, and first Bangladeshi to receive the award was Jamal Nazrul Islam.

=== Ekushey Padak in Social service ===
Ekushey Padak in Social service (Bengali: সমাজসেবায় একুশে পদক) is given by the Government of Bangladesh. This award is given to recognize the unique contribution of social service by Bangladeshi citizens. In 2000, for the first time, Ekushey Padak was introduced in the beginning Mohiuddin Ahmed Ekushey Padak in Social service was given.

== Awards by decade ==
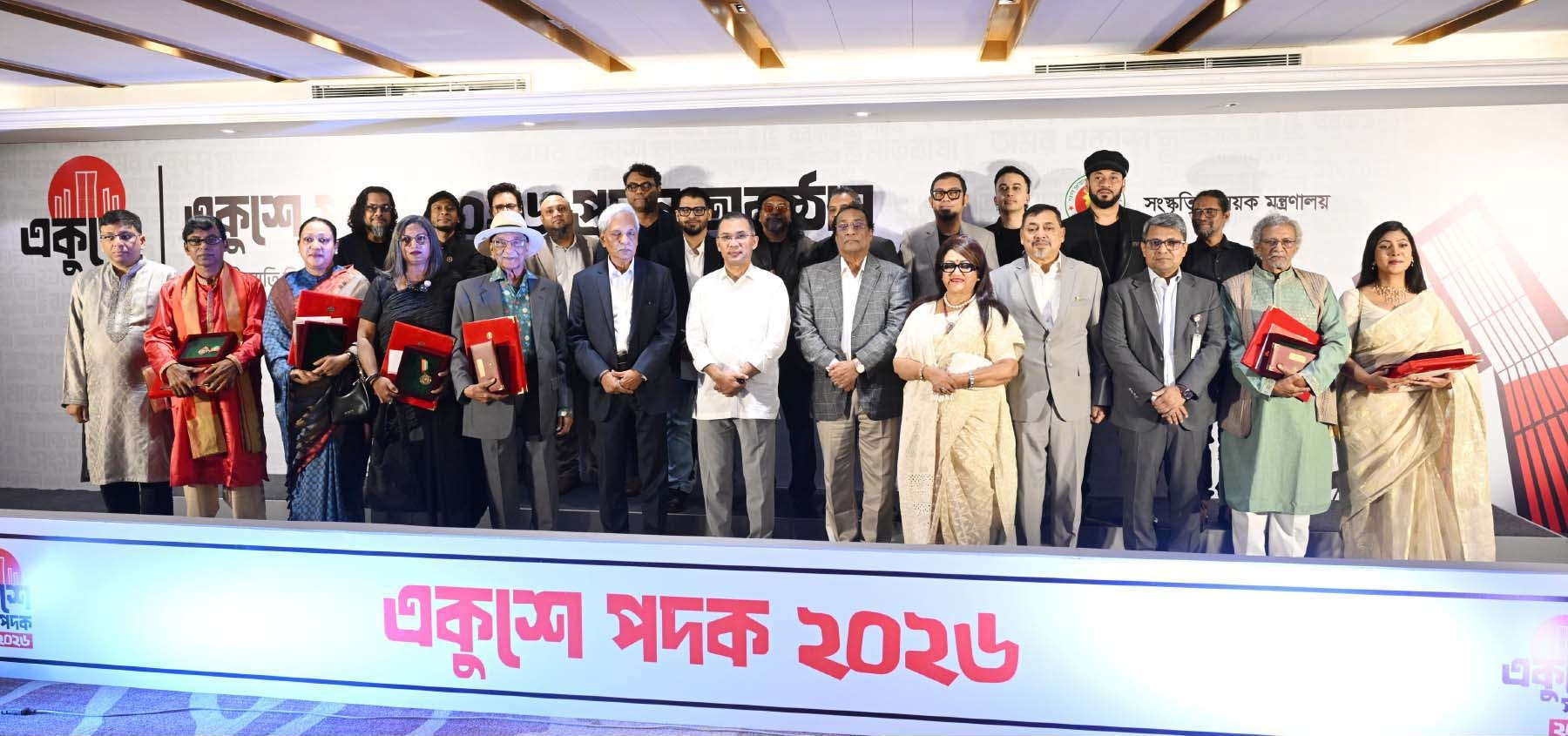
Winners of Ekushey Padak 2026

- List of Ekushey Padak award recipients (1976–1979)
- List of Ekushey Padak award recipients (1980–1989)
- List of Ekushey Padak award recipients (1990–1999)
- List of Ekushey Padak award recipients (2000–2009)
- List of Ekushey Padak award recipients (2010–2019)
- List of Ekushey Padak award recipients (2020–2029)
