= Md. Mujibur Rahman Majnu =

Bangladeshi politician

Member of the Bangladesh Parliament for Bogra-5
- In office 7 January 2024 – 6 August 2024
- Preceded by: Habibur Rahman Habib
- Succeeded by: Golam Mohammad Siraj

Personal details
- Born: 10 December 1952 (age 73)
- Party: Awami League

Md. Mujibur Rahman Majnu (born 10 December 1952) is an Awami League politician and a former Jatiya Sangsad member representing the Bogra-5 constituency.

== Career ==
Majnu is a businessman. The Awami League selected him as their candidate for the Bogra-5 constituency in the 2001 general election. In a seven-way contest, he came third, behind the incumbent and an independent candidate.

In 2009, he was elected chairman of Sherpur Upazila, defeating Rustam Ali. He lost the chairmanship in 2014, but was elected again, unopposed, in 2019.

Majnu was elected to parliament from Bogra-5 as an Awami League candidate on 7 January 2024.
