= Kamrun Nahar Putul =

Bangladeshi politician (died 2020)

- কামরুন্নাহার পুতুল

Member of Parliament for Reserved Women's Seat-4
- In office 23 June 1996 – 15 July 2001
- Preceded by: Shahin Ara Haque
- Succeeded by: Khaleda Panna

Personal details
- Died: 21 May 2020 (aged 65) Bogra, Bangladesh
- Spouse: Mostafizur Rahman Patal

Kamrun Nahar Putul (died 21 May 2020) was a Bangladeshi politician.

== Biography ==
Putul served as the Jatiya Sangsad member representing the Bogura-Joypurhat area, a reserved seat for women from 1996 until 2001.

== Death ==
Putul was married to Mostafizur Rahman Patal, also an Awami League lawmaker elected in 1973. She died after suffering from the complications of COVID-19 on 21 May 2020, during the COVID-19 pandemic in Bangladesh.
