= Ragebul Ahsan Ripu =

Bangladeshi politician

- রাগেবুল আহসান রিপু

Member of the Bangladesh Parliament for Bogra-6
- In office 8 February 2023 – 6 August 2024
- Preceded by: Golam Mohammad Siraj
- Succeeded by: Rezaul Karim Badsha

Personal details
- Born: 6 November 1956 (age 69)
- Party: Bangladesh Awami League

Ragebul Ahsan Ripu (born 6 November 1956) is a Bangladesh Awami League politician and a former Jatiya Sangsad member representing the Bogra-6 constituency during 2023–2024. He has been serving as the Awami League's Bogra district unit general secretary since 2019.

== Career ==
Ripu was elected as a joint secretary of the Bogra District Awami League on the 2015 council. He got a nomination from the Awami League on 3 January 2023.

Ripu was detained after the fall of the Sheikh Hasina-led Awami League government. He suffered from a cardiac arrest while in pre-trial detention at Bogura District Jail.
