= Bogra-5 =

Constituency of Bangladesh's Jatiya Sangsad

Coordinates: 24.67°N 89.42°E

- Constituency for the Jatiya Sangsad
- District: Bogra District
- Division: Rajshahi Division
- Electorate: 572,340 (2026)

Current constituency
- Created: 1973
- Party: Bangladesh Nationalist Party
- Member: Golam Mohammad Siraj
- ← 39 Bogra-4 41 Bogra-6 →

Bogra-5 is a constituency represented in the Jatiya Sangsad (National Parliament) of Bangladesh since 2026 by Golam Mohammad Siraj of the Bangladesh Nationalist Party.

== Boundaries ==
The constituency encompasses Dhunat and Sherpur upazilas.

== History ==
The constituency was created for the first general elections in newly independent Bangladesh, held in 1973.

Ahead of the 2008 general election, the Election Commission redrew constituency boundaries to reflect population changes revealed by the 2001 Bangladesh census. The 2008 redistricting altered the boundaries of the constituency.

Ahead of the 2014 general election, the Election Commission expanded the boundaries of the constituency. Previously it had excluded two union parishads of Dhunat Upazila: Bhandarbari and Gosainbari.

== Members of Parliament ==
Election	Member	Party
1973	Mostafizur Rahman Patal	Awami League
1979	Md. Sirajul Huq Talukder	Bangladesh Nationalist Party
Major Boundary Changes
1986	Ferdous Zaman Mukul	Awami League
1988	Md. Shahjahan Ali Talukder	Jatiya Party
1991	GM Siraj	Bangladesh Nationalist Party
2008	Habibar Rahman	Awami League
2024	Mujibur Rahman Majnu	Awami League
2026	Golam Mohammad Siraj	Bangladesh Nationalist Party

== Elections ==
=== Elections in the 2020s ===
General election 2026: Bogra-5
Party	Candidate	Votes	%	±%
BNP	Golam Mohammad Siraj			
Jamaat	Md Dabibar Rahman			
IAB	Mir Md. Mahmudur Rahman			
CPB	Shipon Kumar Robidash			
LDP	Khan Qudrat-e-Saklayen			
Majority				
Turnout				

=== Elections in the 2010s ===
Habibur Rahman Habib was re-elected unopposed in the 2014 general election after opposition parties withdrew their candidacies in a boycott of the election.

=== Elections in the 2000s ===
General Election 2008: Bogra-5
Party	Candidate	Votes	%	±%
AL	Habibur Rahman Habib	171,177	52.1	+34.2
BNP	Jane Alam Khoka	155,325	47.2	−8.3
IAB	Md. Moquebul Hossain	1,235	0.4	N/A
BDB	Mahbub Ali	510	0.2	N/A
BSD	Ranjan Kumar Dey	399	0.1	N/A
JSD	S. M. Ferdous Alam	116	0.0	N/A
Majority		15,852	4.8	−24.7
Turnout		328,762	91.6	+14.0
AL gain from BNP				

General Election 2001: Bogra-5
Party	Candidate	Votes	%	±%
BNP	Golam Mohammad Siraj	158,842	55.5	+5.3
Independent	Ferdous Zaman Mukul	74,250	25.9	N/A
AL	Md. Mujibur Rahman Majnu	51,116	17.9	−20.6
IJOF	Habibur Rahman	993	0.3	N/A
Independent	Abdur Rashid Mia	603	0.2	N/A
Independent	Md. Belyet Hossain	349	0.1	N/A
Independent	Md. Shah Tajul Islam	125	0.0	N/A
Majority		84,592	29.5	+17.8
Turnout		286,278	77.6	−3.2
BNP hold				

=== Elections in the 1990s ===
General Election June 1996: Bogra-5
Party	Candidate	Votes	%	±%
BNP	Golam Mohammad Siraj	114,843	50.2	+10.3
AL	Ferdous Zaman Mukul	88,059	38.5	+1.9
Jamaat	Md. Monzurul Haque Sarkar	23,542	10.3	−12.9
JP(E)	S. M. Ferdous Alam	778	0.3	N/A
IOJ	Md. Abu Taher	722	0.3	N/A
WPB	Md. Mozahar Ali Prang	479	0.2	N/A
Zaker Party	Md. Abdul Hakim	456	0.2	N/A
Majority		26,784	11.7	+8.4
Turnout		228,879	80.8	+18.7
BNP hold				

General Election 1991: Bogra-5
Party	Candidate	Votes	%	±%
BNP	Golam Mohammad Siraj	69,388	39.9	
AL	Ferdous Zaman Mukul	63,564	36.6	
Jamaat	Md. Shahidur Rahman	40,386	23.2	
Jatiya Samajtantrik Dal-JSD	S. M. Ferdous Alam	523	0.3	
Majority		5,824	3.3	
Turnout		173,861	62.1	
BNP gain from AL				
