= Fashiur Rahman =

Retired Major General and physician of the Bangladesh Army

- Born: July 31, 1959 (age 67)
- Military career
- Allegiance: Bangladesh
- Branch: Bangladesh Army
- Service years: 1985–2021
- Rank: Major General
- Unit: Army Medical Corps
- Commands: Commandant of CMH, Bogra; Director of Mymensingh Medical College; Commandant of Armed Forces Medical College; Director General of Directorate General of Medical Services

Fashiur Rahman is a retired major general and physician of the Bangladesh Army. He was the director general of the Directorate General of Medical Services. He was hoping for the nomination of Awami League in the Pabna-3 seat in the 12th National Parliament election of Bangladesh.
