= Chhagalnaiya =

Chhagalnaiya ছাগলনাইয়া Sagarnaiya
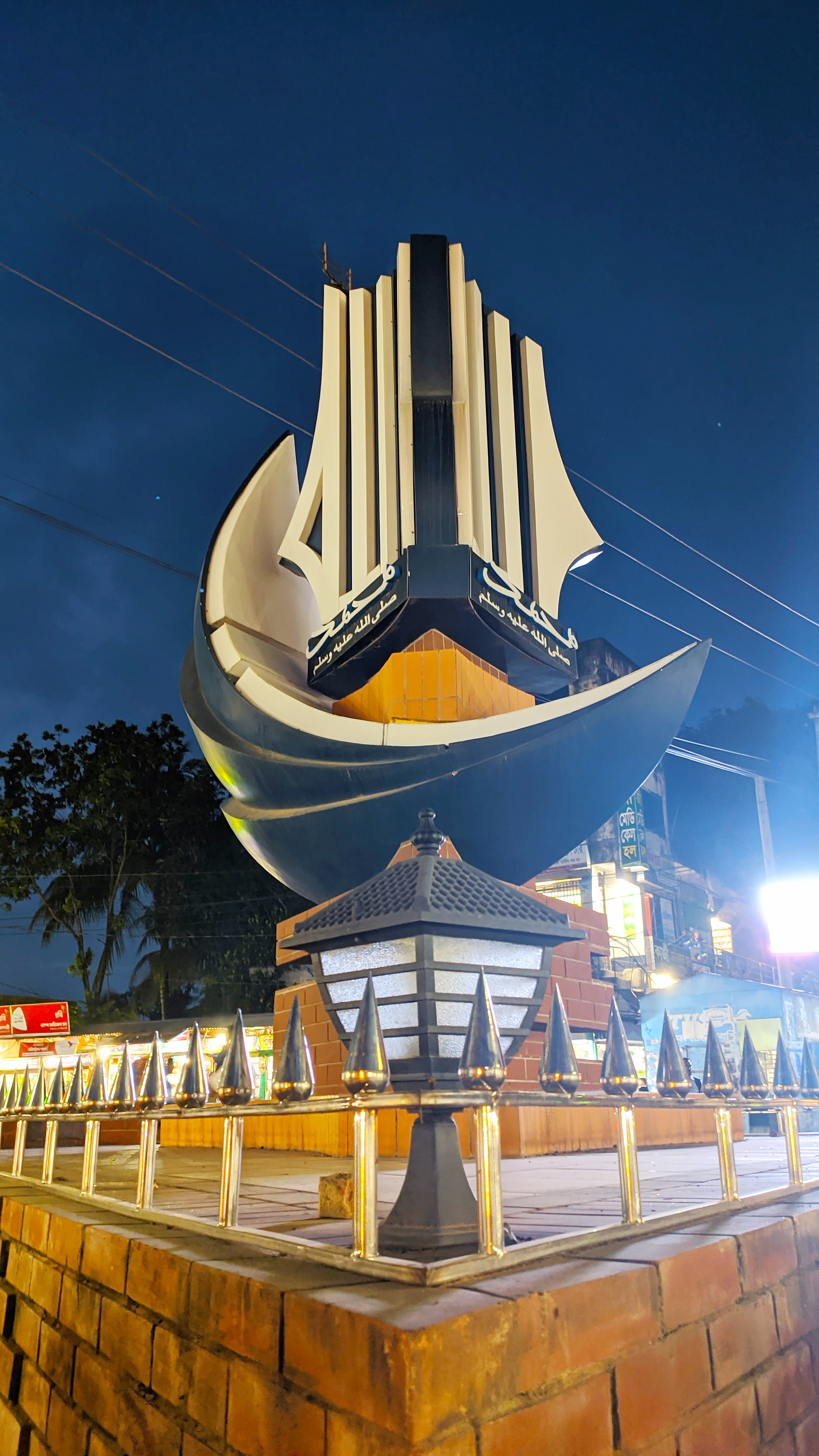
- A sculpture situated at the Zero point of Chhagalnaiya town

- location of Chhagalnaiya town in Bangladesh
- Coordinates: 23.039483°N 91.514628°E
- Country: Bangladesh
- Division: Chittagong
- District: Feni
- Upazila: Chhagalnaiya
- Upazila headquarter: 1 October 1983
- Municipality: 3 June 2002

Government
  - Type: Mayor–Council
  - Body: Chhagalnaiya Municipality
  - Paura Mayor: Mohammad Mostafa

Area
  - Total: 25.3 km^{2} (9.8 sq mi)

Population (2011)
  - Total: 48,243
  - Density: 1,910/km^{2} (4,940/sq mi)
- Time zone: UTC+6 (Bangladesh Time)
- National Dialing Code: +880

Chhagalnaiya Municipality mahallah geocode map

Chhagalnaiya (Bengali: ছাগলনাইয়া) is a town in Feni district of Chittagong Division, Bangladesh. The town is the administrative headquarters and urban centre of Chhagalnaiya Upazila.The urban area of Chhagalnaiya is the biggest in Chhagalnaiya Upazila and 2nd most populous in Feni district. Chhagalnaiya is 14.6 km away from the district headquarter, Feni city while the distance from the Divisional Headquarter, Chittagong is 96.6 km. The nearest airport from Chhagalnaiya town is Shah Amanat International Airport.

== Etymology ==
Despite some beliefs, the origin of the word chhagal (ছাগল, 'goat') in Chhagalnaiya has no connection to the Gandhi's goat stealing incident of 1946. (Note: In Bangladesh, Gandhi is remembered for his visit to the coastal area of Noakhali, the site of a 1946 communal riot, where he walked through villages to calm the mobs. According to legend, during this time, some individuals opposed to Gandhi's philosophy stole his goat, which had been providing him with nourishing milk, and cooked it for dinner.) The Chhagalnaya-Parshuram region, located in this relatively ancient part of Noakhali, had a large portion of its area submerged underwater in the distant past. This body of water was known as either billasagar or sukh sagar (transl. sea of happiness), according to different opinions. Numerous boat wrecks have been discovered in this area once inhabited by boatmen, referred to as sagarer naiya (Bengali: সাগরের নাইয়া, lit. 'boatmen of the sea') in Bengali. Over time, sagarer naiya evolved into sagarnaiya in folk language, and eventually into chagalnaiya, the term used today. Some accounts suggest that during the early British period, the word sagar (sea) was mistakenly transcribed as sagol, resulting in sagolnaiya or Chhagalnaiya.

== Climate ==
Chhagalnaiya

Climate chart (precipitation, max. and min. temperature)
J	F	M	A	M	J	J	A	S	O	N	D
1 24 13	19 27 16	25 29 20	193 30 23	459 27 22	897 24 23	455 26 19	455 26 21	390 26 23	294 27 23	14 26 18	3 24 15
- █ Average max. and min. temperatures in °C
- █ Precipitation totals in mm
Imperial conversion
J	F	M	A	M	J	J	A	S	O	N	D
0 75 55	0.7 81 61	1 84 68	7.6 86 73	18 81 72	35 75 73	18 79 66	18 79 70	15 79 73	12 81 73	0.6 79 64	0.1 75 59
- █ Average max. and min. temperatures in °F
- █ Precipitation totals in inches

== Geography ==
Chhagalnaiya is located at 23.0361°N 91.5194°E. It has an average elevation of 8 metres.

== Demography ==
According to 2011 Bangladesh census, Chhagalnaiya town has a population of about 48,243 of which 23,857 are male and 24,386 are female.

== Administration ==
The town is administered by a local governing body called Chhagalnaiya Municipality or Chhagalnaiya Paurashava which has divided the town into 9 wards. The town occupies an area of 27.04 km^{2} of which municipality governs an area of 25.2 5 km^{2}.

== Transport ==
The town is the road transport hub of the upazila. To the west it is connected by zilla road Z1031 to Feni, about 14 kilometres (8.7 mi) away. Z1035 runs north 23 kilometres (14 mi) to Parshuram. Z1032 runs south 11 kilometres (6.8 mi) to Muhuriganj, where it connects to the Dhaka-Chittagong Highway.

== Education ==
The literacy rate of the town is 62.7%. Some of the notable educational institution of the town are:

- Chhagalnaiya government college
- Chhagalnaiya academy
- Chhagalnaiya Govt. Pilot high school
- Chhagalnaiya Pilot girls high School
- Moulovi Samsul Karim College
- Radhanagar High School
- Karaiya High School

== See also ==
- Chhagalnaiya Upazila
- Feni District
- Chittagong Division
- List of municipal corporations in Bangladesh
