= Chhagalnaiya Upazila =

Chhagalnaiya ছাগলনাইয়া
- Upazila
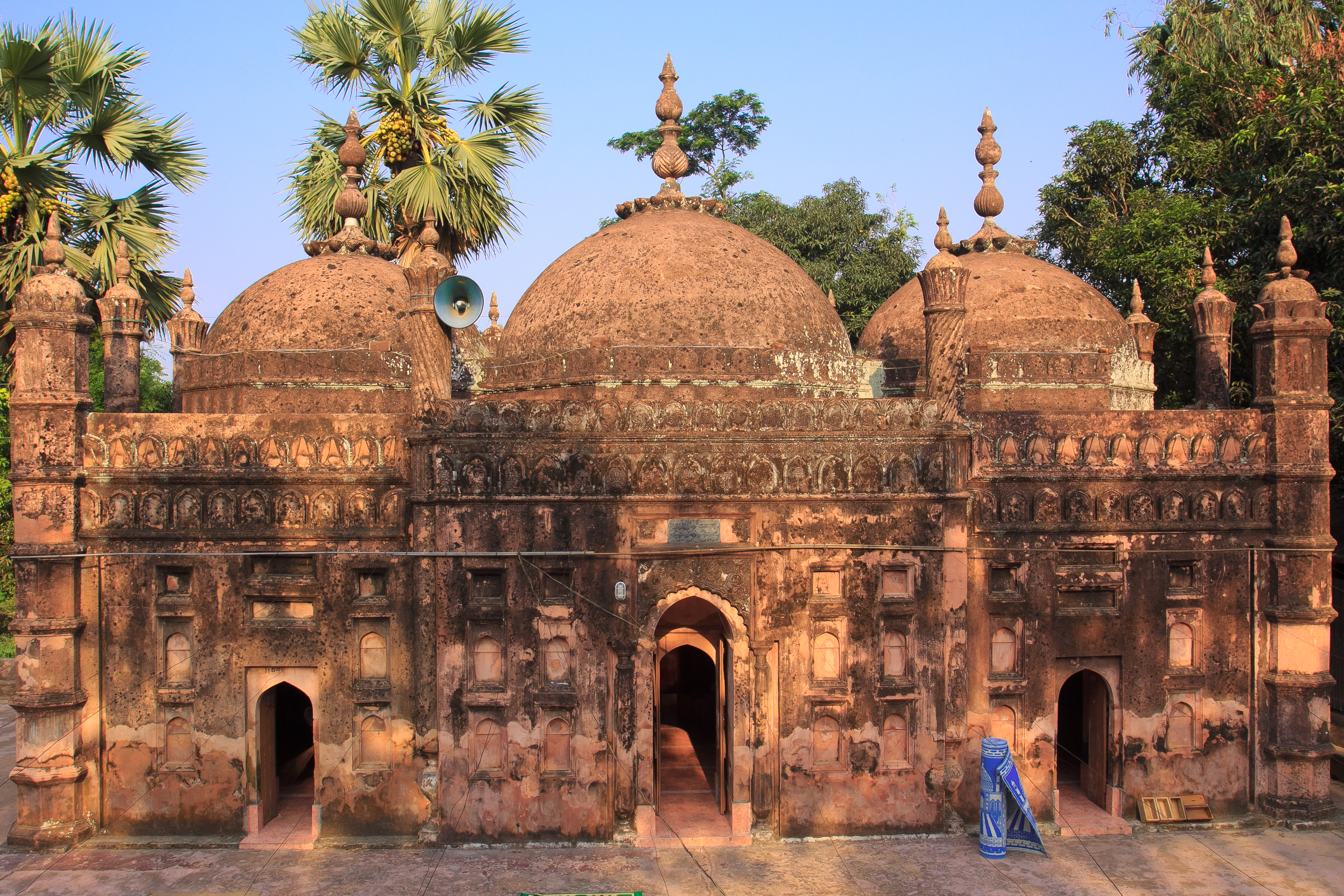
- Chand Ghazi Bhuiyan mosque

- Coordinates: 23°2.2′N 91°31.2′E
- country: Bangladesh
- Division: Chittagong
- District: Feni
- Headquarters: Chhagalnaiya

Area
  - Total: 139.59 km^{2} (53.90 sq mi)

Population (2022)
  - Total: 208,232
  - Density: 1,491.7/km^{2} (3,863.6/sq mi)
- Time zone: UTC+6 (BST)
- Postal code: 3910
- Area code: 0331
- Website: Official Map of Chhagalnaiya

Chhagalnaiya Upazila mauza geocode map

Chhagalnaiya (Bengali: ছাগলনাইয়া) is an upazila of Feni District in the Division of Chittagong, Bangladesh.

Chhagalnaiya lies in the southern part of the district, bordering Tripura and Mirsharai Upazila of Chittagong. It is rich in history and culture. The great medieval warrior Shamsher Gazi hailed from Chhagalnaiya. It is also the birthplace of many other noted historical figures including Sir A. F. Rahman, first Muslim Vice Chancellor of Dhaka University, journalist Abdus Salam, Gaziul Haque, and Riaz Rahman (former foreign secretary).

== Etymology ==
Despite some beliefs, the origin of the word chhagal (ছাগল, 'goat') in Chhagalnaiya has no connection to the Gandhi's goat stealing incident of 1946. (Note: In Bangladesh, Gandhi is remembered for his visit to the coastal area of Noakhali, the site of a 1946 communal riot, where he walked through villages to calm the mobs. According to legend, during this time, some individuals opposed to Gandhi's philosophy stole his goat, which had been providing him with nourishing milk, and cooked it for dinner.) The Chhagalnaya-Parshuram region, located in this relatively ancient part of Noakhali, had a large portion of its area submerged underwater in the distant past. This body of water was known as either billasagar or sukh sagar (transl. sea of happiness), according to different opinions. Numerous boat wrecks have been discovered in this area once inhabited by boatmen, referred to as sagarer naiya (Bengali: সাগরের নাইয়া, lit. 'boatmen of the sea') in Bengali. Over time, sagarer naiya evolved into sagarnaiya in folk language, and eventually into chagalnaiya, the term used today. Some accounts suggest that during the early British period, the word sagar (sea) was mistakenly transcribed as sagol, resulting in sagolnaiya or Chhagalnaiya.

== Geography and history ==
Chhagalnaiya is located at 23.0361°N 91.5194°E. It has 36,744 household units and a total area of 139.59 km^{2}.

Chhagalnaiya is an upazila in the Feni district in Bangladesh.

== Demographics ==
Religions in Chhagalnaiya Upazila (2022)
Religion	Percent
Islam	97.37%
Hinduism	2.56%
Other or not stated	0.07%

According to the 2022 Bangladeshi census, Chhagalnaiya Upazila had 48,608 households and a population of 208,232. 9.78% of the population were under 5 years of age. Chhagalnaiya had a literacy rate (age 7 and over) of 81.68%: 83.62% for males and 80.03% for females, and a sex ratio of 87.79 males for every 100 females. 67,050 (32.20%) lived in urban areas.

As of the 2011 Census of Bangladesh, Chhagalnaiya upazila had 36,744 households and a population of 187,156. 41,904 (22.39%) were under 10 years of age. Chhagalnaiya had an average literacy rate of 63.38%, compared to the national average of 51.8%, and a sex ratio of 1091 females per 1000 males. 48,243 (25.78%) of the population lived in urban areas.

== Administration ==
UNO: Saiful Islam Komol.

Chhagalnaiya Upazila is divided into Chhagalnaiya Municipality and five union parishads: Gopal, Mohamaya, Pathan gar, Radhanagar, and Shubhapur. The union parishads are subdivided into 54 mauzas and 58 villages.

Chhagalnaiya Municipality is subdivided into 9 wards and 11 mahallas.

== Notable people ==
- Abdus Salam, journalist and editor
- Shamsher Ghazi, warlord and ruler of Tippera
- Kazi Mozammel Haque, historian and writer
- Obaidullah Majumdar, professor and politician

== See also ==
- Upazilas of Bangladesh
- Districts of Bangladesh
