= Golam Mohammad Siraj =

Bangladeshi politician

- গোলাম মোহাম্মদ সিরাজ

Member of Parliament
- Incumbent
- Assumed office 17 February 2026
- Preceded by: Md. Mujibur Rahman Majnu
- Constituency: Bogra-5
- In office 25 June 2019 – 11 December 2022
- Preceded by: Mirza Fakhrul Islam Alamgir
- Succeeded by: Ragebul Ahsan Ripu
- Constituency: Bogra-6
- In office 20 March 1991 – 29 October 2006
- Preceded by: Md. Shahjahan Ali Talukder
- Succeeded by: Habibur Rahman Habib
- Constituency: Bogra-5

Personal details
- Born: 15 January 1950 (age 76) Bogra, East Bengal, Pakistan
- Party: Bangladesh Nationalist Party
- Education: M.Com
- Occupation: Politician, businessman

Golam Mohammad Siraj (born 15 January 1950), known as GM Siraj, is a Bangladesh Nationalist Party politician. He served as a Jatiya Sangsad member representing the Bogra-5 and Bogra-6 constituencies He resigned from the latest position on 11 December 2022.

== Career ==
Siraj is an elected to parliament from Bogra-6 of 11th Parliament and from Bogura-5 as a Bangladesh Nationalist Party with in total 5 times MP. He is also the chairman of SR group.
