= Mojibar Rahman =

Bangladeshi politician

Member of Bangladesh Parliament

Personal details
- Party: Bangladesh Nationalist Party

Mojibar Rahman is a Bangladesh Nationalist Party politician and a former member of parliament for Bogra-6.

== Career ==
Rahman was elected to parliament from Bogra-6 as a Bangladesh Nationalist Party candidate in 1991.
