= S M Jahangir Hossain =

Bangladeshi politician

- এস এম জাহাঙ্গীর হোসেন

Member of the Bangladesh Parliament for Dhaka-18
- Incumbent
- Assumed office 17 February 2026
- Preceded by: Khosru Chowdhury

Personal details
- Born: 1 January 1973 (age 53) Dhaka, Bangladesh
- Party: Bangladesh Nationalist Party
- Education: Tejgaon College (BA)
- Occupation: Politician

S M Jahangir Hossain is a Bangladeshi politician. He is the joint convener of the Convener Committee of the Dhaka North City unit of the Bangladesh Nationalist Party (BNP) and a member of parliament.

== Early life ==
Hossain was born on 1 January 1973 in Dhaka, Bangladesh. After completing his higher secondary education, Hossain enrolled at Tejgaon College. In 1988, he became a member of the Bangladesh Jatiyatabadi Chhatra Dal (BJCD), a student wing of the Bangladesh Nationalist Party (BNP). He participated in the 1990 Bangladesh mass uprising. In the same year, he served as the general secretary of the college unit of BJCD. The following year, he was elected vice president of his college's student union. In 1994, he served as the social welfare secretary of the BJCD. In 1996, when a murder case was filed against him, Hossain went into hiding for safety reasons. In 2001, he was appointed president of the Dhaka North City unit of BJCD. In the political sphere, he was a follower of Saiful Alam Nirob, a leader of the BNP. In the early 2000s, he left the country for some time and stayed abroad. He later joined the Bangladesh Jatiotabadi Jubodal (BJJD), youth wing of the BNP. During the period of One Eleven, he again went into hiding in 2007 and 2008. In 2010, he simultaneously became the general secretary of the Dhaka North City units of both BJCD and BJJD. He subsequently served as the central publicity secretary of BJJD. In 2017, he was appointed president of the partially formed Dhaka North City unit committee of BJJD, with instructions to complete the full committee within one month. However, as he was also serving as a vice president of the organization's central committee, he soon stepped down from the new responsibility.

== Political career ==
In the 2018 Bangladeshi general election, he contested from the Dhaka-18 constituency as a candidate of the BNP. In 2020, following the death of the sitting parliament member Sahara Khatun, her seat became vacant. A by-election was announced, and the BNP nominated Hossain as its candidate. In the by-election, he contested against Mohammad Habib Hasan of the Awami League (AL). In 2023, according to a verdict in a case filed ten years earlier at Uttara East police station, a court reportedly sentenced 73 accused to seven years' imprisonment, including him. During the 2024 Bangladesh quota reform movement, Jahangir expressed support for the students and regularly joined the protests from Uttara, Dhaka. As a result, he was arrested by the police and his residence was attacked. The movement later turned into the July Uprising, and following the resignation of Sheikh Hasina as prime minister in 5 August, Jahangir was released from prison. After release, he began strengthening connection with his local activists and building a personal political network at the grassroots level. Shortly after his release, he filed a case at Uttara West police station in 2025 against 82 individuals, including Sheikh Hasina, over an alleged attack on the motorcade of BNP party chairperson Khaleda Zia. As of 2025, he served as joint convener of the convener committee of the Dhaka North City unit of the BNP. For the 2026 Bangladeshi general election, BNP again nominated him as its candidate for the Dhaka-18 constituency. In the election, he was elected as a member of parliament, receiving approximately 33,000 more votes than his nearest rival Ariful Islam of the National Citizen Party (NCP). On 1 November 2026, Hossain was appointed member secretary of the temporary partial convening committee of the Dhaka North City unit.

== Personal life ==
Jahangir's wife's name is Razia Sultana. The couple have two daughters. Their residence is located in Abdullahpur, near Uttara.
