= Tejgaon =

Tejgaon may refer to:

== Places ==
- Tejgaon Thana, a thana in Dhaka, Bangladesh
  - Tejgaon Airport
  - Tejgaon College
  - Tejgaon Government Girls' High School
  - Tejgaon Mohila College
- Tejgaon Industrial Area Thana, a thana in Dhaka, Bangladesh
- Tejgaon, Raebareli, a village in Uttar Pradesh, India
