= Dhamsana Union =

Union parishad of Dhaka, Bangladesh

Dhamsana ধামসোনা Dhamsona
- Union council
- No. 2 Dhamsana Union Parishad
- Location within Dhaka division Location within Bangladesh
- Coordinates: 23°56′32″N 90°15′16″E
- Country: Bangladesh
- Division: Dhaka
- District: Dhaka
- Upazila: Savar

Government
  - Type: Union Parishad
  - Chairman: Vacant

Area
  - Total: 32.77 km^{2} (12.65 sq mi)
- Elevation: 16 m (52 ft)

Population (2011)
  - Total: 308,024
  - Density: 9,400/km^{2} (24,340/sq mi)
- Time zone: UTC+6 (BST)
- Postal code: 1349

Dhamsana (Bengali: ধামসোনা), also transliterated as Dhamsona, is a union parishad under Savar Upazila, Dhaka District, Dhaka Division, Bangladesh. The union covers an area of 32.77 square kilometres. Its parishad office is located in Bolibhadra Bazar area. In the year 2011, Dhamsana is the most populous union in Bangladesh, with a total population of 308,024.

== Demographics ==
According to the 2011 Census of Bangladesh, Dhamsana Union has a total of 92,036 households and 308,024 inhabitants. Among the population, 162,372 are male and 145,652 are female. The total literacy rate is 75%, with 78.4% of the male population and 71.1% of the female population being literate.

== Administrative divisions ==
As of the year 2011, Dhamsana consists of 14 mouzas. They are listed below:

Mouzas	Population (2011)
Baipail	110,472
Bashbari	10,315
Chhota Pachhail	788
Dehara	12,878
Deodasa	229
Dhamsana	1,843
Enayetpur	3,894
Ganakbari	97,129
Maihjail	981
Nalam	3,177
Nalam Bagbari	1,462
Palashbari	59,797
Subandi	2,645
Unail	2,414

== Notable Person ==
Mohammad Saiful Islam who is an MP of Dhaka-19 Savar Constituency. A resident of the union.

== See also ==
- Savar Upazila
- Dhaka District
