= Parbat Khera =

- Village
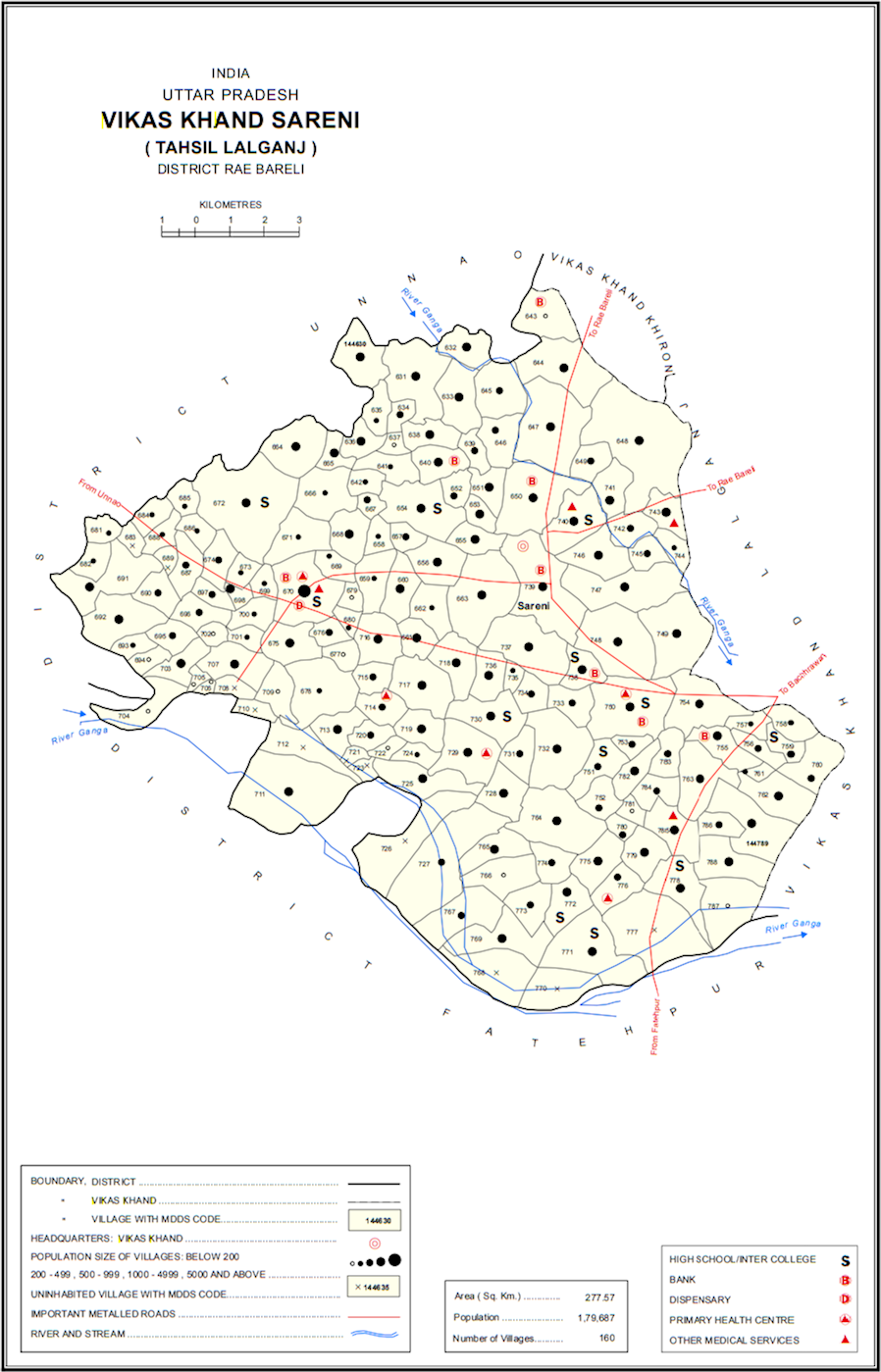
- Map showing Parbat Khera (#757) in Sareni CD block

- Location in Uttar Pradesh, India
- Coordinates: 26.109424°N 80.884521°E
- Country: India
- State: Uttar Pradesh
- District: Raebareli

Area
  - Total: 0.517 km^{2} (0.200 sq mi)

Population (2011)
  - Total: 437
  - Density: 845/km^{2} (2,190/sq mi)

Languages
  - Official: Hindi
- Time zone: UTC+5:30 (IST)
- Vehicle registration: UP-35

Parbat Khera is a village in Sareni block of Rae Bareli district, Uttar Pradesh, India. It is located 11 km from Lalganj, the tehsil headquarters. As of 2011, it has a population of 437 people, in 77 households. It has one primary school and no healthcare facilities and does not host a weekly haat or a permanent market. It belongs to the nyaya panchayat of Malkegaon.

The 1951 census recorded Parbat Khera as comprising 1 hamlet, with a total population of 144 people (67 male and 77 female), in 38 households and 34 physical houses. The area of the village was given as 130 acres. 7 residents were literate, all male. The village was listed as belonging to the pargana of Sareni and the thana of Sareni.

The 1961 census recorded Parbat Khera as comprising 1 hamlet, with a total population of 172 people (78 male and 94 female), in 33 households and 30 physical houses. The area of the village was given as 130 acres.

The 1981 census recorded Parbat Khera as having a population of 241 people, in 44 households, and having an area of 49.77 hectares. The main staple foods were given as wheat and rice.

The 1991 census recorded Parbat Khera (as "Parwat Khera") as having a total population of 341 people (176 male and 165 female), in 52 households and 52 physical houses. The area of the village was listed as 51 hectares. Members of the 0-6 age group numbered 77, or 23% of the total; this group was 51% male (39) and 49% female (38). Members of scheduled castes made up 33% of the village's population, while no members of scheduled tribes were recorded. The literacy rate of the village was 36% (97 men and 27 women). 100 people were classified as main workers (79 men and 21 women), while 17 people were classified as marginal workers (all women); the remaining 224 residents were non-workers. The breakdown of main workers by employment category was as follows: 52 cultivators (i.e. people who owned or leased their own land); 21 agricultural labourers (i.e. people who worked someone else's land in return for payment); 0 workers in livestock, forestry, fishing, hunting, plantations, orchards, etc.; 0 in mining and quarrying; 18 household industry workers; 0 workers employed in other manufacturing, processing, service, and repair roles; 0 construction workers; 6 employed in trade and commerce; 0 employed in transport, storage, and communications; and 3 in other services.
