= Ashraf Uddin Khan Imu =

Bangladeshi Politician

Member of the Bangladesh Parliament for Dhaka-12
- In office 1988–1991
- Preceded by: Shamsuddoha Khan Majlish
- Succeeded by: Md. Niamatullah

Personal details
- Political party: Bangladesh Awami League

Ashraf Uddin Khan Imu is a Bangladesh Awami League politician and a former member of parliament for Dhaka-12.

== Career ==
Imu was elected to parliament from Dhaka-12 in 1988 as a Bangladesh Awami League candidate. He is the vice-president of Dhaka District unit of Bangladesh Awami League.
