= Pasan Khera =

Pasan Khera Pāsan Khera
- Village
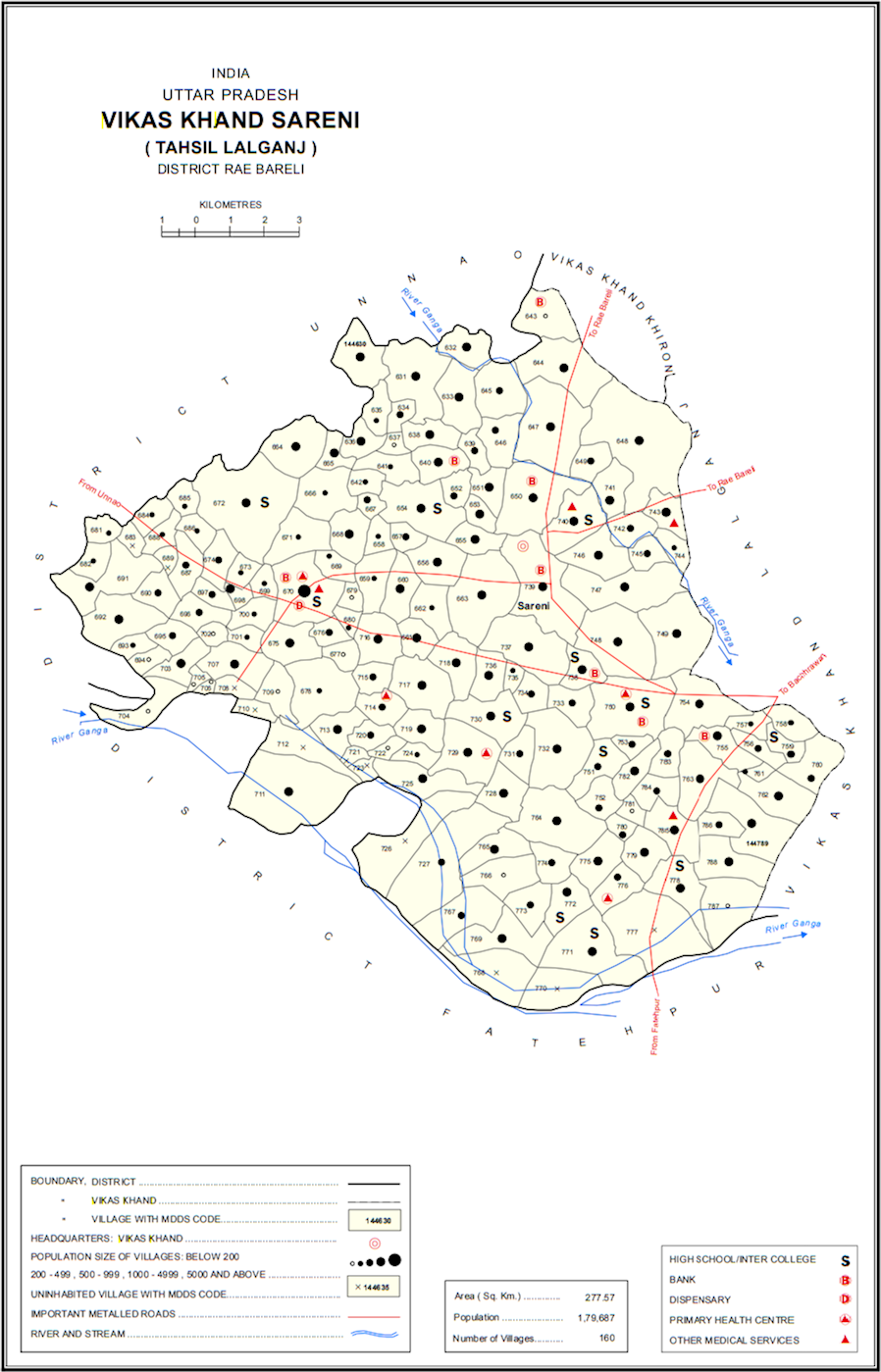
- Map showing Pasan Khera (#753) in Sareni CD block

- Location in Uttar Pradesh, India
- Coordinates: 26.102101°N 80.853914°E
- Country: India
- State: Uttar Pradesh
- District: Raebareli

Area
  - Total: 0.484 km^{2} (0.187 sq mi)

Population (2011)
  - Total: 671
  - Density: 1,390/km^{2} (3,590/sq mi)

Languages
  - Official: Hindi
- Time zone: UTC+5:30 (IST)
- Vehicle registration: UP-35

Pasan Khera is a village in Sareni block of Rae Bareli district, Uttar Pradesh, India. It is located 13 km from Lalganj, the tehsil headquarters. As of 2011, it has a population of 671 people, in 99 households. It has no healthcare facilities and does not host a weekly haat or a permanent market. It belongs to the nyaya panchayat of Malkegaon.

The 1951 census recorded Pasan Khera as comprising 1 hamlet, with a total population of 233 people (116 male and 117 female), in 45 households and 36 physical houses. The area of the village was given as 114 acres. 29 residents were literate, 26 male and 3 female. The village was listed as belonging to the pargana of Sareni and the thana of Sareni.

The 1961 census recorded Pasan Khera as comprising 1 hamlet, with a total population of 269 people (134 male and 135 female), in 46 households and 40 physical houses. The area of the village was given as 114 acres.

The 1981 census recorded Pasan Khera as having a population of 425 people, in 73 households, and having an area of 46.14 hectares. The main staple foods were given as wheat and rice.

The 1991 census recorded Pasan Khera (as "Vasan Khera") as having a total population of 472 people (247 male and 225 female), in 72 households and 72 physical houses. The area of the village was listed as 46 hectares. Members of the 0-6 age group numbered 71, or 15% of the total; this group was 51% male (36) and 49% female (35). Members of scheduled castes made up 29% of the village's population, while no members of scheduled tribes were recorded. The literacy rate of the village was 51% (165 men and 76 women). 107 people were classified as main workers (93 men and 14 women), while 0 people were classified as marginal workers; the remaining 365 residents were non-workers. The breakdown of main workers by employment category was as follows: 39 cultivators (i.e. people who owned or leased their own land); 41 agricultural labourers (i.e. people who worked someone else's land in return for payment); 0 workers in livestock, forestry, fishing, hunting, plantations, orchards, etc.; 0 in mining and quarrying; 0 household industry workers; 7 workers employed in other manufacturing, processing, service, and repair roles; 0 construction workers; 10 employed in trade and commerce; 0 employed in transport, storage, and communications; and 10 in other services.
