= Asaduzzaman Khan =

Bangladeshi politician

Asaduzzaman Khan Kamal
- আসাদুজ্জামান খাঁন কামাল
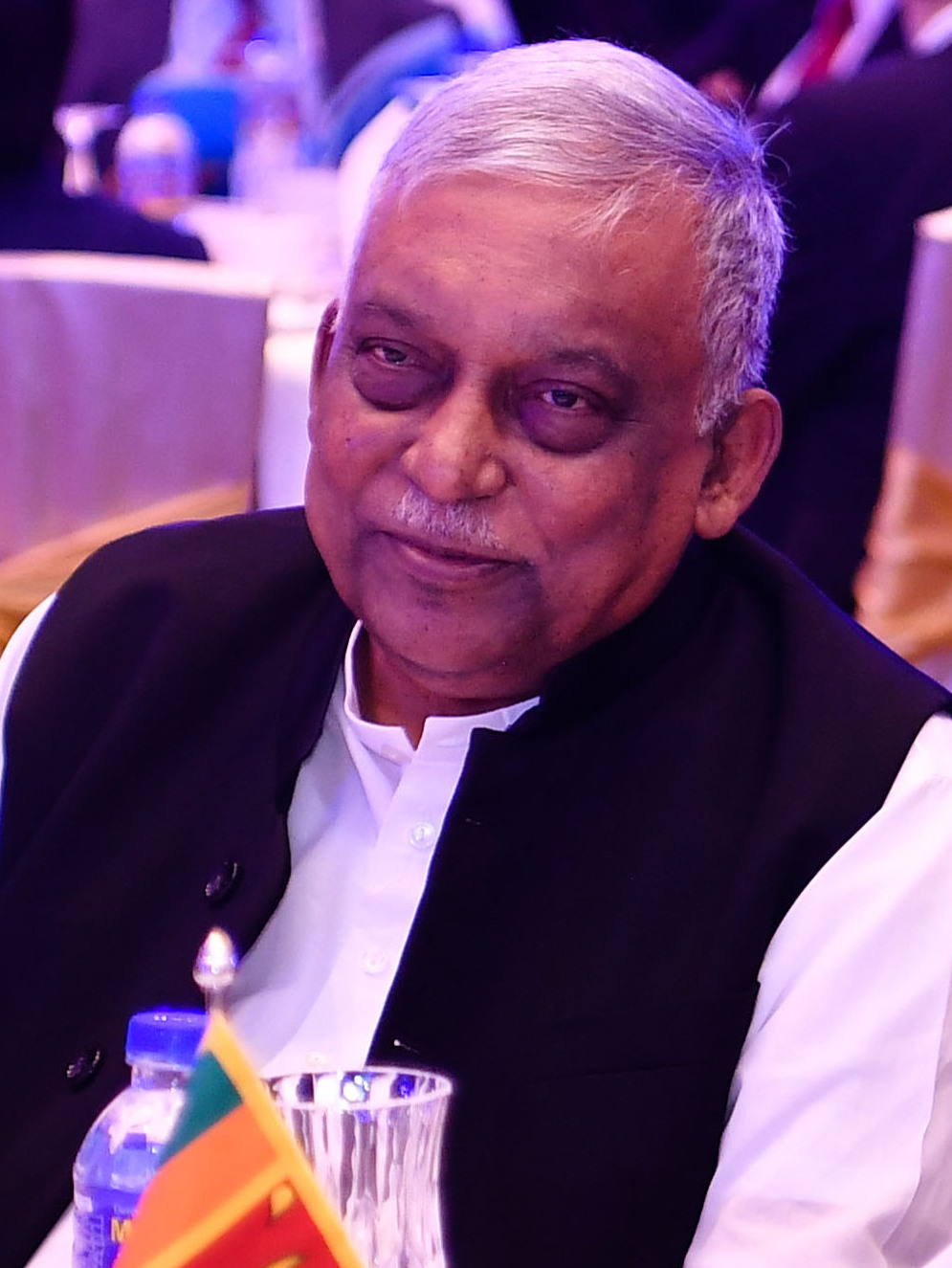
- Khan in 2023

Minister of Home Affairs
- In office 15 July 2015 – 6 August 2024
- Prime Minister: Sheikh Hasina
- Preceded by: Muhiuddin Khan Alamgir
- Succeeded by: M Sakhawat Hossain

Member of Parliament
- In office 12 January 2014 – 6 August 2024
- Preceded by: Sheikh Fazle Noor Taposh
- Succeeded by: Saiful Alam Khan Milon
- Constituency: Dhaka-12
- In office 29 January 2009 – 28 January 2014
- Preceded by: S. A. Khaleque
- Succeeded by: AKM Rahmatullah
- Constituency: Dhaka-11

Personal details
- Born: 31 December 1950 (age 75) Dacca, East Bengal, Dominion of Pakistan
- Party: Bangladesh Awami League
- Spouse: Lutful Tahmina Khan
- Children: Safi Muddaser Khan Joty; Safia Tasnim Khan
- Parents: Ashraf Ali Khan (father); Akramunnessa (mother)
- Occupation: Politician, businessman

Asaduzzaman Khan Kamal (born 31 December 1950) is a Bangladeshi politician who served as the Minister of Home Affairs from 2015 to 2024 as a member of the deposed Awami League. He has been convicted by International Crimes Tribunal of Bangladesh as one of the key perpetrators of the July massacre, for which he is currently wanted by the government of Bangladesh. (Note: Citations:)

Khan also held the constituent seats of Dhaka-11 from 2009 to 2014, and Dhaka-12 from 2014 to 2024.

== Early life ==
Khan was born on 31 December 1950 in Monipuripara, Dhaka, in the then East Bengal, Dominion of Pakistan to Ashraf Ali Khan, a government service holder, and Akramunnessa. His ancestors were from Dohar Upazila. In 1965, he completed his SSC from Tejgaon Polytechnic High school (now Tejgaon Government High School) and in 1967, he completed his HSC from Jagannath College (now Jagannath University).

== Career ==
Khan was a member of the Mukti Bahini and fought in the Bangladesh Liberation War in 1971. He served in sector 2 under Captain Abdul Halim Chowdhury. He was elected to Parliament in December 2008, and from 2009 to 2013, he served in the Parliamentary Standing Committee on Housing and Public Works. He was a member of the Bangladesh Press Council. He founded the Dohar Padma College, and served as the President of the Ispahani School and College and Tejgaon College, two reputed colleges (both founded after Bangladesh's liberation war). He is a senate member of the Sher-e-Bangla Agricultural University. He was re-elected in January 2014 and on 12 January 2014, he was made the State Minister of Home Affairs. On 14 July 2015 he was made the Minister of Home Affairs.

On 22 January 2024, he was awarded the honorary Great Wall Commemorative Medal by the Chinese government. The Chinese Ambassador to Bangladesh, Yao Wen, presented the award and certificate during a ceremony held at the Ministry of Home Affairs in Dhaka. Established by China's Ministry of Public Security in 2020, the medal recognizes foreign law enforcement officers who have significantly contributed to the safety of Chinese citizens.

== Controversies ==
According to the official report BGB provided to OHCHR, Kamal, on behalf of the former Prime Minister Sheikh Hasina, acting as the Director-General of her Special Security Force and her Military and Security Advisor, provided verbal directives to "use maximum force" during the July Uprising.

On 13 August 2024, a murder complaint was filed at a court in Dhaka against Khan and five other government officials, including ex-Prime Minister Sheikh Hasina, regarding the killing of a grocer during the 2024 Bangladesh quota reform movement on 19 July.

On 9 October 2024, The Anti-Corruption Commission (ACC) filed separate cases against Asaduzzaman Khan, his wife Lutful Tahmina Khan, their two children Safi Muddasir Khan and Safia Tasnim Khan, and his Assistant Private Secretary (APS) Monir Hossain, accusing them of amassing illegal wealth, misuse of power, bribery in recruitment, and money laundering. ACC director general Akhtar Hossain stated that the investigation revealed that the former minister and his family accumulated around Tk 60.55 crore in illegal wealth and concealed Tk 416.74 crore across 36 bank accounts. Additionally, Monir Hossain was found to have amassed Tk 18.82 crore illegally, with suspicious transactions amounting to Tk 31.31 crore in 12 bank accounts. The Bangladesh Financial Intelligence Unit (BFIU) has already suspended the transactions in their accounts.

While in exile, he gave an interview to The Indian Express, alleging that the July Uprising was the result of a "joint coup by Islamic terrorists and the army". He also called for the Indian government to diplomatically intervene to pressure the interim government to remove the court cases against him and other Awami League leaders. He has been called the "Butcher Of Bangladesh" by Press Secretary Shafiqul Alam.

== Personal life ==
Kamal is married to Lutful Tahmina Khan. They have a son, Safi Muddaser Khan Joty, and a daughter, Safia Tasnim Khan. Joty was arrested on 14 September 2024 in connection to the alleged attempted murder of a protestor.
