= Dhaka-12 =

Constituency of Bangladesh's Jatiya Sangsad

Coordinates: 23.71°N 90.42°E

- Constituency for the Jatiya Sangsad
- District: Dhaka District
- Division: Dhaka Division
- Electorate: 333,320 (2026)

Current constituency
- Created: 1973
- Party: Bangladesh Jamaat-e-Islami
- Member: Saiful Alam Khan Milon
- ← 184 Dhaka-11 186 Dhaka-13 →

Dhaka-12 is a constituency represented in the Jatiya Sangsad (National Parliament) of Bangladesh since 2026 by Saiful Alam Khan Milon of the Bangladesh Jamaat-e-Islami.

== Boundaries ==
The constituency encompasses Dhaka North City Corporation wards 24 through 27, 35, and 36.

== History ==
The constituency was created for the first general elections in newly independent Bangladesh, held in 1973.

Ahead of the 2008 general election, the Bangladesh Election Commission redrew constituency boundaries to reflect population changes revealed by the 2001 Bangladesh census. The 2008 redistricting added 7 new seats to the Dhaka metropolitan area, increasing the number of constituencies in the capital from 8 to 15, and altered the boundaries of the constituency.

== Members of Parliament ==
Election	Member	Party
1973	Sheikh Mujibur Rahman	Awami League
1973 by-election	Mohammad Hanif	Awami League
1979	Jahangir Mohammad Adel	Bangladesh Nationalist Party
1986	Shamsuddoha Khan Majlish	Awami League
1988	Ashraf Uddin Khan Imu	Jatiya Party
1991	Md. Niamatullah	Bangladesh Nationalist Party
Feb 1996	Md. Niamatullah	Bangladesh Nationalist Party
Jun 1996	Dewan Md. Salauddin	Bangladesh Nationalist Party
2001	Dewan Md. Salauddin	Bangladesh Nationalist Party
2008	Sheikh Fazle Noor Taposh	Awami League
2014	Asaduzzaman Khan	Awami League
2018	Asaduzzaman Khan	Awami League
2024	Asaduzzaman Khan	Awami League
2026	Saiful Alam Khan Milon	Bangladesh Jamaat-e-Islami

== Elections ==
=== Elections in the 2020s ===
General Election 2026: Dhaka-12
Party	Candidate	Votes	%	±%
Jamaat	Saiful Alam Khan Milon	53,773	44.0	N/A
BRWP	Saiful Haque	30,963	25.3	N/A
Independent	Saiful Alam Nirob	29,869	24.4	N/A
IAB	Mahmudul Hasan	2,058	1.7	N/A
JP(E)	Sarkar Mohammad Salauddin	1,770	1.4	N/A
GSA	Taslima Akhter	1,511	1.2	N/A
Amjanatar Dol	Md. Tarek Rahman	1,044	0.9	N/A
CPB	Kallol Banik	453	0.4	N/A
BIF	Mohammad Shahjalal	184	0.2	N/A
Janotar Dol	Farid Ahmed	175	0.1	N/A
IBB	Mosa. Salma Akter	133	0.1	N/A
GOP	Abul Bashar Chowdhury	115	0.1	N/A
BSM	Muntasir Mahmud	115	0.1	N/A
NDM	Mominul Amin	58	0.0	N/A
BJP	Mohammad Naeem Hasan	47	0.0	N/A
Majority		22,810	18.7	N/A
Turnout		122,268	36.7	N/A
Registered electors		333,320		
Jamaat gain from AL				

=== Elections in the 2010s ===
Asaduzzaman Khan was elected unopposed in the 2014 general election after opposition parties withdrew their candidacies in a boycott of the election.

=== Elections in the 2000s ===
General Election 2008: Dhaka-12
Party	Candidate	Votes	%	±%
AL	Sheikh Fazle Noor Taposh	118,136	62.0	+22.0
BNP	Khandaker Mahbub Ahmad	69,262	36.3	−20.8
IAB	Md. Abdul Awal	2,552	1.3	N/A
Gano Forum	Nurun Nahar Habib	193	0.1	N/A
United Citizen Movement	Md. Shahidul Islam Khan	158	0.1	N/A
Independent	Md. Afzal Hossain Bachchu	127	0.1	N/A
BRWP	Md. Baharana Sultan Bahar	117	0.1	N/A
JSD	Abul Kalam Azad	112	0.1	N/A
Majority		48,874	25.6	+8.6
Turnout		190,657	73.1	+3.4
AL gain from BNP				

General Election 2001: Dhaka-12
Party	Candidate	Votes	%	±%
BNP	Dewan Md. Salauddin	139,788	57.1	+12.4
AL	Talukdar Mohammad Towhid Jung Murad	98,062	40.0	+10.3
IJOF	Md. Neyamat Ullah	5,708	2.3	N/A
BKA	Hafez Maulana Ali Abbas	767	0.3	−0.6
CPB	Lina Chakrabarti	359	0.1	N/A
Jatiya Party (M)	Md. Khandokar Shahin Aldin Rejvi	177	0.1	N/A
Majority		41,726	17.0	+2.0
Turnout		244,861	69.7	−5.2
BNP hold				

=== Elections in the 1990s ===
General Election June 1996: Dhaka-12
Party	Candidate	Votes	%	±%
BNP	Dewan Md. Salauddin	71,243	44.7	−7.3
AL	Ashraf Uddin Khan Imu	47,343	29.7	−1.0
JP(E)	Md. Firoj Kabir	33,361	21.0	+18.4
Jamaat	Md. Hasan Mahabub	4,450	2.8	−0.8
BKA	Mohammad Samsuddin	1,357	0.9	N/A
Zaker Party	Md. Nazim Uddin	595	0.4	−0.6
NAP	Md. Mafijul Islam	421	0.3	N/A
Gano Forum	Siraj Uddin Ahmed	366	0.2	N/A
Jatiya Janata Party (Asad)	Gazi Nazrul Islam	67	0.0	N/A
Majority		23,900	15.0	−6.4
Turnout		159,203	74.9	+15.6
BNP hold				

General Election 1991: Dhaka-12
Party	Candidate	Votes	%	±%
BNP	Md. Niamatullah	63,279	52	
AL	Shamsuddoha Khan Majlish	37,298	30.7	
Independent	Ashraf Uddin Khan Imu	8,279	6.8	
Jamaat	Md. Shahidul Islam	4,402	3.6	
JP(E)	Mezbah	3,119	2.6	
CPB	Mujahidul Islam Selim	2,282	1.9	
Zaker Party	Abul Hasan	1,211	1.0	
BKA	Md. Shamsuddin	861	0.7	
NAP (Muzaffar)	Mafizul Islam	673	0.6	
Jatiya Samajtantrik Dal-JSD	Abul Hossain	282	0.2	
Majority		25,981	21.4	
Turnout		121,686	59.3	
BNP gain from				
