= Dhaka-18 =

Constituency of Bangladesh's Jatiya Sangsad

Coordinates: 23.86°N 90.43°E

- Constituency for the Jatiya Sangsad
- District: Dhaka District
- Division: Dhaka Division
- Electorate: 605,400 (2026)

Current constituency
- Created: 1973 (Original); 2008 (Redistricted)
- Party: Bangladesh Nationalist Party
- Member: SM Jahangir Hossain
- ← 190 Dhaka-17 192 Dhaka-19 →

Dhaka-18 is a constituency represented in the Jatiya Sangsad (National Parliament) of Bangladesh since 2026 by SM Jahangir Hossain of the Bangladesh Nationalist Party.

== Boundaries ==
The constituency encompasses Dhaka North City Corporation wards 1 and 17, and Bimanbandar, Dakshin Khan, Khilkhet, Turag, Uttara East, Uttara West and Uttar Khan thanas.

== History ==
The constituency was created when, ahead of the 2008 general election, the Election Commission redrew constituency boundaries to reflect population changes revealed by the 2001 Bangladesh census. The 2008 redistricting added 7 new seats to the Dhaka metropolitan area, increasing the number of constituencies in the capital from 8 to 15.

== Members of Parliament ==
Election	Member	Party
1973	Mohammad Anwar Jung Talukdar	Awami League
1979	Chowdhury Tanbir Ahmed Siddiky	Bangladesh Nationalist Party
2008	Sahara Khatun	Awami League
2014	Sahara Khatun	Awami League
2018	Sahara Khatun	Awami League
2020	Mohammad Habib Hasan	Awami League
2024	Khosru Chowdhury	Independent
2026	S M Jahangir Hossain	Bangladesh Nationalist Party

== Elections ==
=== Elections in the 2020s ===
General election 2026: Dhaka-18
Party	Candidate	Votes	%	±%
BNP	S M Jahangir Hossain	144,715	56.53	N/A
NCP	Ariful Islam	111,297	43.47	N/A
IAB	Md. Anwar Hossain	4,727	1.72	N/A
Independent	Md. Mohiuddin Howladar	3,205	1.17	N/A
JP(E)	Md. Zakir Hossain	2,557	0.93	
Majority		33,418	13.06	−47.33
Turnout		274,667	44.76	−23.82
Registered electors		613,883		
BNP gain from Independent				

=== Elections in the 2010s ===
General Election 2018: Dhaka-18
Party	Candidate	Votes	%	±%
AL	Sahara Khatun	302,006	79.23	−17.0
JSD (Rab)	Shaheed Uddin Mahmud	71,792	18.84	N/A
IAB	Md Anwar Hossain	7,401	1.94	N/A
Majority		230,214	60.39	−31.9
Turnout		381,199	68.58	+35.2
Registered electors		555,773		
AL hold				

General Election 2014: Dhaka-18
Party	Candidate	Votes	%	±%
AL	Sahara Khatun	160,820	96.2	+32.5
BNF	Atikur Rahman Nazim	6,417	3.8	N/A
Majority		154,403	92.3	+63.5
Turnout		167,237	33.4	−42.3
AL hold				

=== Elections in the 2000s ===
General Election 2008: Dhaka-18
Party	Candidate	Votes	%	±%
AL	Sahara Khatun	213,332	63.7	N/A
BNP	SK Azizul Bari Helal	116,786	34.9	N/A
IAB	Md. Farid Uddin Dewan	1,883	0.6	N/A
Jatiya Samajtantrik Dal-JSD	Md. Liakat Hossain Miah	837	0.3	N/A
Independent	Abu Ahammad Zahirul Amin Khan	656	0.2	N/A
Bangladesh Kalyan Party	Sk. Shahidujjaman	385	0.1	N/A
Gano Forum	Ameen Ahmed Afsary	319	0.1	N/A
BTF	A. H. Mostfa Kamal	272	0.1	N/A
BKA	Md. Shahidulla Kazi	219	0.1	N/A
Gano Front	Md. Aman Ullah Sikder	105	0.0	N/A
Majority		96,546	28.8	N/A
Turnout		334,794	75.7	N/A
AL win (new seat)				
