= Khosru Chowdhury =

Bangladeshi politician and Former Member of Parliament

- খসরু চৌধুরী
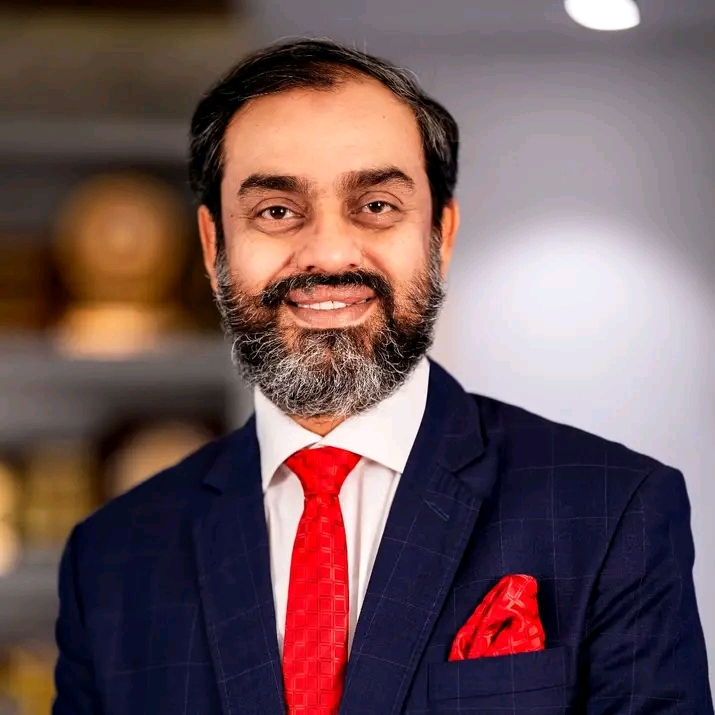

Member of the Bangladesh Parliament for Dhaka-18
- In office 30 January 2024 – 6 August 2024
- Preceded by: Mohammad Habib Hasan
- Succeeded by: S M Jahangir Hossain

Personal details
- Born: June 10, 1973 (age 52)
- Party: Bangladesh Awami League

Khosru Chowdhury is a Bangladeshi businessman and politician. He is a former Jatiya Sangsad member representing the Dhaka-18 constituency.
