= Tejgaon, Raebareli =

Tejgaon Tejgāon
- Village
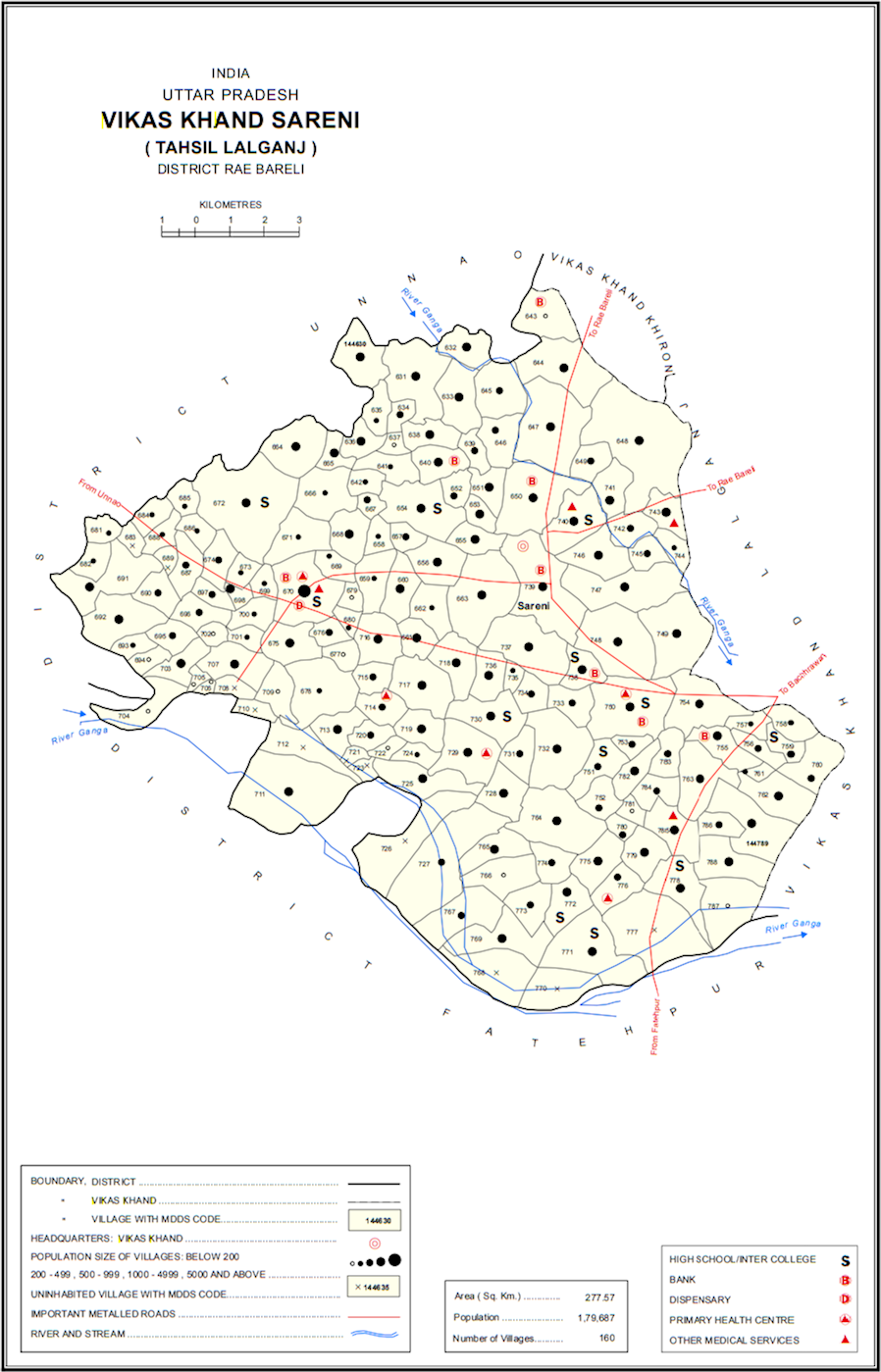
- Map showing Tejgaon (#750) in Sareni CD block

- Location in Uttar Pradesh, India
- Coordinates: 26.107661°N 80.853853°E
- Country: India
- State: Uttar Pradesh
- District: Raebareli

Area
  - Total: 4.808 km^{2} (1.856 sq mi)

Population (2011)
  - Total: 4,431
  - Density: 921.6/km^{2} (2,387/sq mi)

Languages
  - Official: Hindi
- Time zone: UTC+5:30 (IST)
- Vehicle registration: UP-35

Tejgaon is a village in Sareni block of Rae Bareli district, Uttar Pradesh, India. It is located 14 km from Lalganj, the tehsil headquarters. As of 2011, it has a population of 4,431 people, in 738 households. It has one primary school and one medical clinic, and hosts both a weekly haat and a permanent market. It belongs to the nyaya panchayat of Malkegaon.

The 1951 census recorded Tejgaon as comprising 9 hamlets, with a population of 1,508 people (715 male and 793 female), in 236 households and 203 physical houses. The area of the village was given as 1,310 acres. 100 residents were literate, 80 male and 20 female. The village was listed as belonging to the pargana of Sareni and the thana of Sareni.

The 1961 census recorded Tejgaon as comprising 7 hamlets, with a total population of 1,764 people (892 male and 872 female), in 278 households and 232 physical houses. The area of the village was given as 1,310 acres.

The 1981 census recorded Tejgaon as having a population of 2,358 people, in 394 households, and having an area of 480.78 hectares. The main staple foods were given as wheat and rice.

The 1991 census recorded Tejgaon as having a total population of 2,937 people (1,532 male and 1,405 female), in 511 households and 508 physical houses. The area of the village was listed as 481 hectares. Members of the 0-6 age group numbered 552, or 19% of the total; this group was 54% male (300) and 46% female (252). Members of scheduled castes made up 34% of the village's population, while no members of scheduled tribes were recorded. The literacy rate of the village was 41% (896 men and 299 women). 831 people were classified as main workers (648 men and 183 women), while 0 people were classified as marginal workers; the remaining 2,106 residents were non-workers. The breakdown of main workers by employment category was as follows: 391 cultivators (i.e. people who owned or leased their own land); 272 agricultural labourers (i.e. people who worked someone else's land in return for payment); 7 workers in livestock, forestry, fishing, hunting, plantations, orchards, etc.; 1 in mining and quarrying; 5 household industry workers; 21 workers employed in other manufacturing, processing, service, and repair roles; 2 construction workers; 23 employed in trade and commerce; 6 employed in transport, storage, and communications; and 103 in other services.
