= Md. Enamur Rahaman =

Bangladeshi politician

Enamur Rahman
- এনামুর রহমান
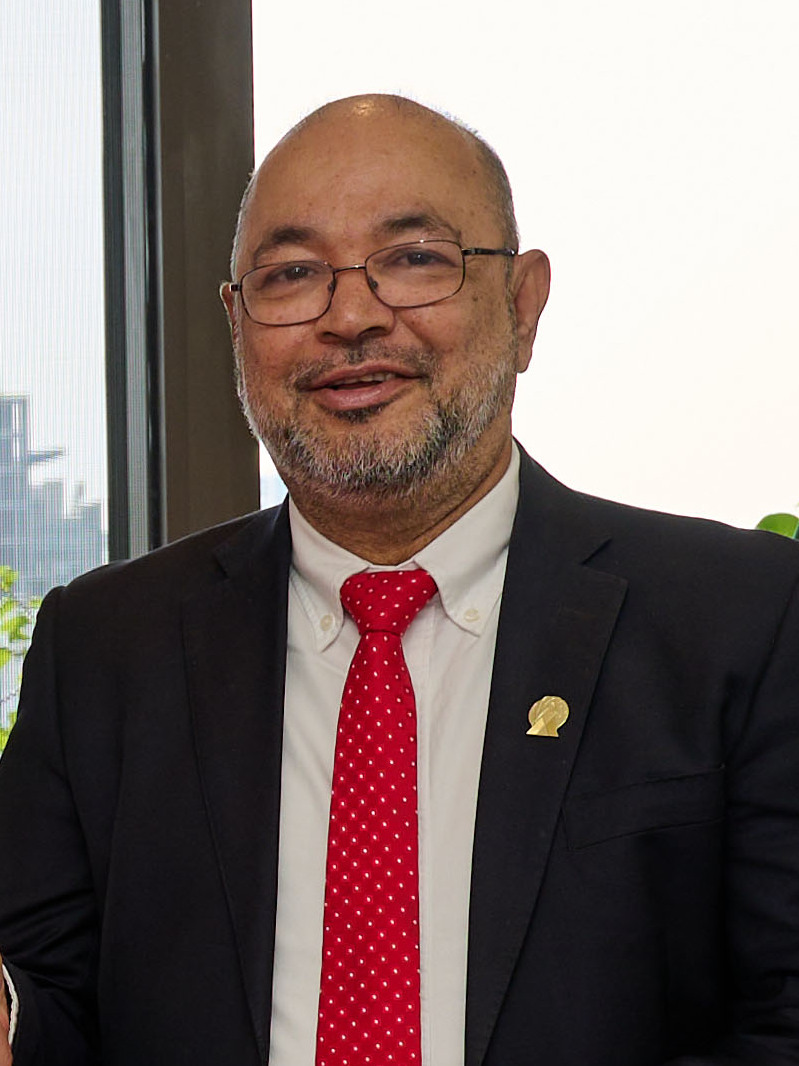
- Rahman in 2022

Minister of State for Disaster Management and Relief
- In office 7 January 2019 – 10 January 2024
- Prime Minister: Sheikh Hasina
- Preceded by: Mofazzal Hossain Chowdhury
- Succeeded by: Muhibur Rahman Muhib

Member of Parliament
- In office 29 January 2014 – 9 January 2024
- Preceded by: Towhid Jung Murad
- Succeeded by: Mohammad Saiful Islam
- Constituency: Dhaka-19

Personal details
- Born: 8 March 1957 (age 69) Savar Upazila, Dhaka, East Pakistan, Pakistan
- Party: Bangladesh Awami League
- Spouse: Farida Parveen
- Education: Chittagong Medical College

Md. Enamur Rahman (born 8 March 1957) is a Bangladesh Awami League politician. He served as the State Minister for Ministry of Disaster Management and Relief during 2019–2024 and the Jatiya Sangsad member representing the Dhaka-19 constituency during 2014–2024.

== Background ==
Rahman completed MBBS from Chittagong Medical College in 1983.

== Career ==
Enamur joined the government service after passing the Bangladesh Civil Service Examination in 1982. During his career, he served in Savar and Gopalganj districts. In 1992, he returned to Savar and established a 6-bed clinic called Enam Clinic. Established Enam Medical College and Hospital in 2003. After the collapse of Rana Plaza in Savar on 24 April 2013, Enam Medical College and Hospital and its founder Enamur Rahman became nationally known for providing medical care to the injured for three months at various stages.

Following the fall of the Sheikh Hasina led Awami League government, Rahman was arrested by Detective Branch in January 2025.

== Personal life ==
Rahman is 1st married to Rowshan Ara Chowdhury & 3rd married to Farida Parveen.

== Political life ==
While still a student of Enamur, he joined student politics and played an active role in the popular uprising of 1969 and the general elections of 1970. During the Bangladesh War of Independence in 1971, he helped the Liberation Army by translating letters written in Urdu by the Pakistan Army into Bengali. The 2014 Tenth He was elected unopposed from Dhaka-19 constituency in the National Parliament elections. He won from the same seat in the 2018 11th National Assembly election. On 7 January 2019, he was sworn in as the Minister of State for Disaster Management and Relief in Sheikh Hasina's fourth cabinet.
