= Dhaka-19 =

Constituency of Bangladesh's Jatiya Sangsad

Coordinates: 23.83°N 90.26°E

- Constituency for the Jatiya Sangsad
- District: Dhaka District
- Division: Dhaka Division
- Electorate: 747,070 (2026)

Current constituency
- Created: 1973 (Original); 2008 (Redistricted)
- Party: Bangladesh Nationalist Party
- Member: Dewan Md. Salauddin
- ← 191 Dhaka-18 193 Dhaka-20 →

Dhaka-19 is a constituency represented in the Jatiya Sangsad (National Parliament) of Bangladesh since 2026 by Dewan Md. Salauddin of the Bangladesh Nationalist Party.

== Boundaries ==
The constituency encompasses all but the four southernmost union parishads of Savar Upazila: Amin Bazar, Bhakurta, Kaundia, and Tetuljhora.

== History ==
The constituency was created when, ahead of the 2008 general election, the Election Commission redrew constituency boundaries to reflect population changes revealed by the 2001 Bangladesh census. The 2008 redistricting added 7 new seats to Dhaka District, increasing the number of constituencies in the district from 13 to 20. One of the new seats usurped the name Dhaka-12, and the former constituency of that name became Dhaka-19.

Ahead of the 2014 general election, the Election Commission reduced the boundaries of the constituency. Previously it had included one more union parishad of Savar Upazila: Kaundia.

== Members of Parliament ==
Election	Member	Party
1973	Ataur Rahman Khan	Bangladesh Jatiya League
1979	Mohammad Habibullah	Bangladesh Nationalist Party
Major Boundary Changes
2008	Talukdar Mohammad Towhid Jung Murad	Awami League
2014	Md. Enamur Rahman	Awami League
2018	Md. Enamur Rahman	Awami League
2024	Mohammad Saiful Islam	Independent
2026	Dewan Md. Salauddin	Bangladesh Nationalist Party

== Elections ==
=== Elections in the 2020s ===
General election 2026: Dhaka-19
Party	Candidate	Votes	%	±%
BNP	Dewan Md. Salauddin	192,583	56.66	+44.36
NCP	Dilshana Parul	126,872	37.17	New
Majority		65,711	19.49	−54.59
Turnout		337,069	45.12	−30.98
Registered electors		747,070		
BNP gain from Independent				

=== Elections in the 2010s ===
General Election 2018: Dhaka-19
Party	Candidate	Votes	%	±%
AL	Md. Enamur Rahman	490,524	86.38	N/A
BNP	Dewan Md. Salauddin	69,876	12.30	N/A
JP(E)	Md Abul Kalam Azad	1,236	0.22	N/A
IAB	Mohammad Faruk Khan	6,608	1.16	N/A
Majority		420,648	74.08	
Turnout		568,244	76.10	
Registered electors		746,947		
AL hold				

Md. Enamur Rahman was elected unopposed in the 2014 general election after opposition parties withdrew their candidacies in a boycott of the election.

=== Elections in the 2000s ===
General Election 2008: Dhaka-19
Party	Candidate	Votes	%	±%
AL	Talukdar Mohammad Towhid Jung Murad	282,492	61.9	N/A
BNP	Dewan Md. Salauddin	170,719	37.4	N/A
IAB	Hazi Ibrahim	2,160	0.5	N/A
CPB	Lina Chakrabarti	651	0.1	N/A
KSJL	Md. Abu Yousuf Khan	569	0.1	N/A
Majority		111,773	24.5	N/A
Turnout		456,591	75.8	N/A
AL win (new seat)				
