= Mohammad Habibullah =

Bangladeshi politician

Member of Bangladesh Parliament
- In office 18 February 1979 – 12 February 1982

Personal details
- Party: Bangladesh Nationalist Party

Mohammad Habibullah (Bengali: মোহাম্মদ হাবিবউল্লাহ) is a Bangladesh Nationalist Party politician and a former member of parliament for Dhaka-19.

== Career ==
Habibullah was elected to parliament from Dhaka-19 as a Bangladesh Nationalist Party candidate in 1979.
