= Saiful Alam Khan Milon =

Bangladeshi politician

- সাইফুল আলম খান মিলন
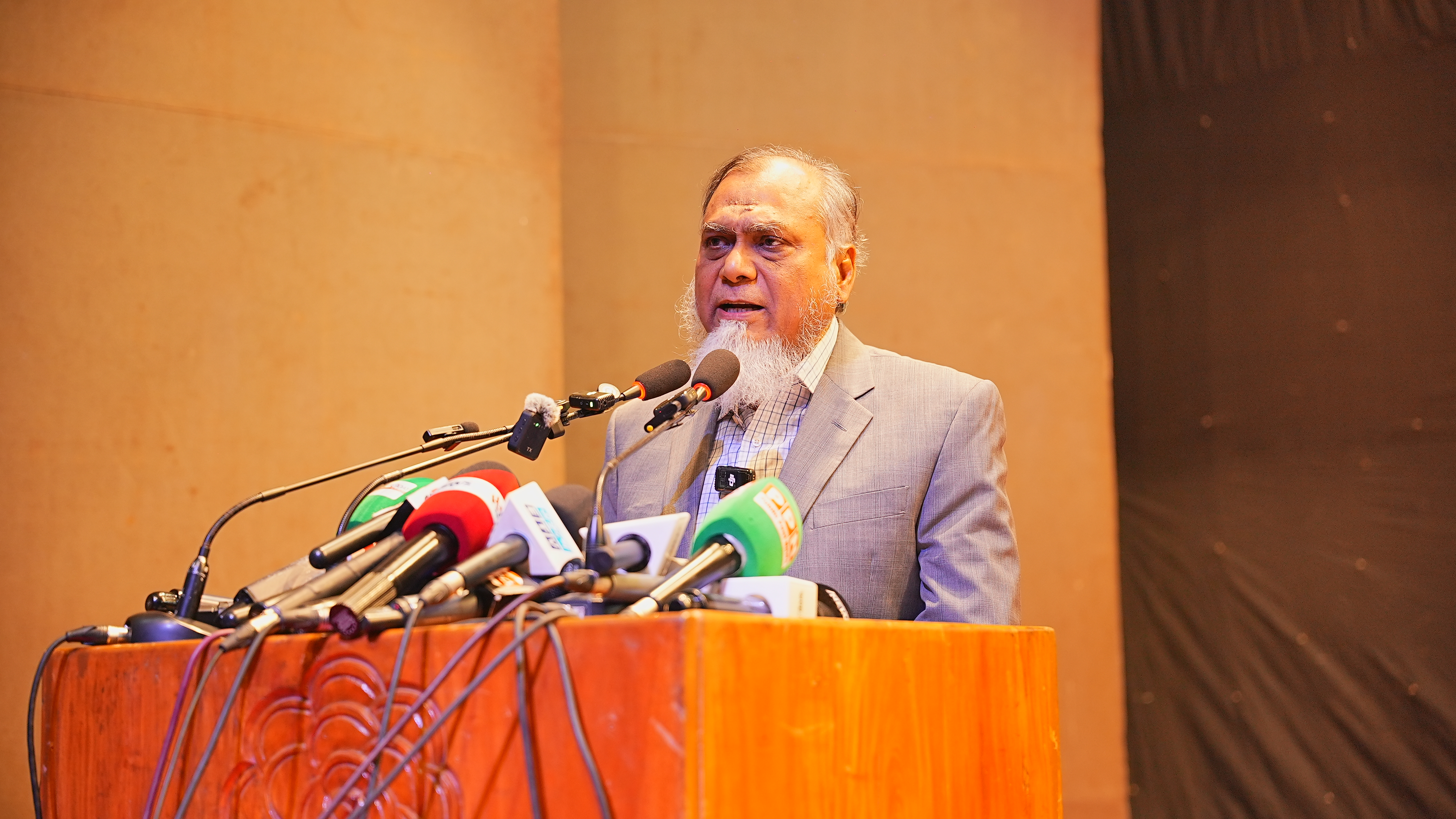
- Milton in 2025

Member of Parliament
- Incumbent
- Assumed office 17 February 2026
- Preceded by: Asaduzzaman Khan
- Constituency: Dhaka-12

President of Bangladesh Islami Chhatra Shibir
- In office 1982–1983
- Preceded by: Ahmad Abdul Qader
- Succeeded by: Muhammad Tasneem Alam

Personal details
- Born: January 1, 1954 (age 72) Dhaka, East Pakistan
- Party: Bangladesh Jamaat-e-Islami
- Relations: Mir Quasem Ali (uncle); Mir Ahmad Bin Quasem (cousin)
- Occupation: Politician

Saiful Alam Khan Milon is a Bangladesh Jamaat-e-Islami politician. He is the incumbent Jatiya Sangsad member representing the Dhaka-12 constituency since February 2026.

== Career ==
Milon won the 2026 Bangladeshi general election contesting at the Dhaka-12 constituency securing 53,773 votes while his nearest opponent Revolutionary Workers Party of Bangladesh candidate Saiful Haque got 30,963 votes.
