= Mohammad Saiful Islam =

Bangladeshi politician

- মুহাম্মদ সাইফুল ইসলাম

Member of the Bangladesh Parliament for Dhaka-19
- In office 30 January 2024 – 6 August 2024
- Preceded by: Md. Enamur Rahman
- Succeeded by: Dewan Mohammad Salahuddin

Personal details
- Born: 20 December 1970 (age 55) Dhamsana Union, Savar Upazila, Dhaka
- Party: Bangladesh Awami League
- Occupation: Politician

Mohammad Saiful Islam (born 20 December 1970) is a Bangladeshi politician and a former Jatiya Sangsad member representing the Dhaka-19 constituency. He was elected as an independent candidate in the 12th National Parliament Elections of 2024.

== Political life ==
Saiful Islam is a Bangladesh Awami League politician and the General Secretary of Ashulia Thana Awami League. He was elected as an independent candidate in the 2024 Bangladeshi general election. He represented the Dhaka-19 constituency.

Saiful Islam has a master's degree in political science.

== Execution ==
On 5 February 2025, the International Crimes Tribunal (Bangladesh) sentenced Saiful Islam to death in a crimes against humanity case over the killing of seven people, including the burning of the bodies of six people in the Ashulia area.
