= Dewan Md. Salauddin =

Bangladeshi politician

Dewan Md. Salahuddin
- দেওয়ান মোহাম্মদ সালাউদ্দিন
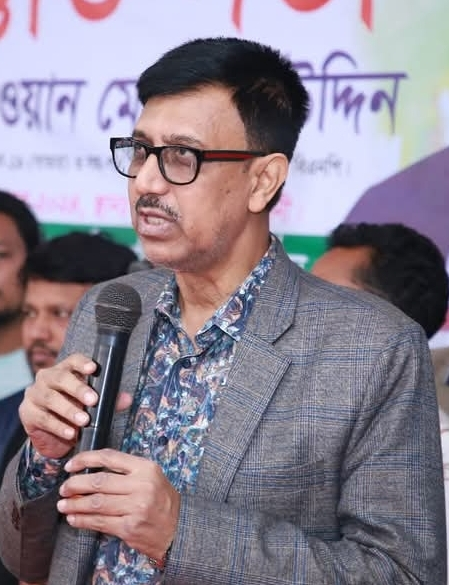
- Salauddin in 2024

Member of Parliament
- Incumbent
- Assumed office 17 February 2026
- Preceded by: Mohammad Saiful Islam
- Constituency: Dhaka-19
- In office 14 July 1996 – 27 October 2006
- Preceded by: Md. Niamatullah
- Succeeded by: Sheikh Fazle Noor Taposh
- Constituency: Dhaka-12

Personal details
- Born: 1 October 1962 (age 63) Savar, East Pakistan, Pakistan
- Party: Bangladesh Nationalist Party
- Spouse: Sabina Siddiqua Rita (m. 1992)
- Parent: Dewan Mohammad Idris (father)
- Education: Mymensingh Medical College (M.B.B.S); Momenshahi Cadet College
- Website: dewansalahuddin.com

Dewan Md. Salahuddin (born 1 October 1962) is a Bangladeshi politician. He is the incumbent Jatiya Sangsad member representing the Dhaka-19 constituency since February 2026. He is president of the Dhaka District Bangladesh Nationalist Party (BNP). Earlier, he was elected to the parliament twice (1996–2001, 2001–2006) from Dhaka-12 constituency.

== Political career ==
Salahuddin was elected to parliament from Dhaka-12 as a Bangladesh Nationalist Party candidate in 1996 and 2001. In January 2000, he was made a member of the Parliamentary Standing Committee on Health Ministry.

Ahead of the 2008 general election, the Election Commission redrew constituency boundaries to reflect population changes revealed by the 2001 Census of Bangladesh. The constituency formerly known as Dhaka-12 became Dhaka-19. Salahuddin stood as a BNP candidate for the new seat in 2008, but was defeated by Talukdar Mohammad Towhid Jung Murad.

On 25 October 2015, Salahuddin was arrested from his residence on several charges of election-related violence. He was released on bail in March 2016. He said the charges were politically motivated.

Salahuddin again stood in the 2018 general election, for Dhaka-19. He came second to the Awami League incumbent. He won the 2026 Bangladeshi general election contesting at the same constituency securing 190,976 votes while his nearest opponent National Citizen Party candidate Dilshana Parul received 125,283 votes.
