= Md. Niamatullah =

Bangladeshi politician

Member of Bangladesh Parliament
- In office 1991–1996
- Preceded by: Ashraf Uddin Khan Imu
- Succeeded by: Dewan Md. Salauddin

Personal details
- Party: Bangladesh Nationalist Party

Md. Niamatullah is a Bangladesh Nationalist Party politician and a former member of parliament for Dhaka-12.

== Career ==
Niamatullah was elected to parliament from Dhaka-12 as a Bangladesh Nationalist Party candidate in 1991.
