= Mohammad Anwar Jung Talukdar =

Bangladeshi politician

Member of Parliament
- In office 1973–1976
- Succeeded by: Chowdhury Tanbir Ahmed Siddiky
- Constituency: Dhaka-18

Personal details
- Born: Ashulia, Savar Upazila, Dhaka,
- Died: 1986; Dhaka, Bangladesh
- Political party: Bangladesh Awami League
- Children: Talukdar Mohammad Towhid Jung Murad

Talukdar Mohammad Anwar Jung was a Bangladesh Awami League politician and a member of parliament for Dhaka-18.

== Career ==
Talukdar was elected to parliament from Dhaka-18 as a Bangladesh Awami League candidate in 1973.

== Personal life ==
Talukdar's son, Talukdar Mohammad Towhid Jung Murad, became a member of parliament from his constituency in 2008.

== Death ==
Talukdar Mohammad Anwar Jung died in 1986.
