= Talukdar Mohammad Towhid Jung Murad =

Bangladeshi politician

Talukdar Mohammad Towhid Jung
- তালুকদার মোহাম্মদ তৌহিদ জং

Member of Parliament
- In office 30 December 2008 – 24 January 2014
- Preceded by: Dewan Md. Salauddin
- Succeeded by: Md. Enamur Rahaman
- Constituency: Dhaka-19

Personal details
- Born: 23 August 1971 (age 54) Ashulia, Savar Upazila, Dhaka, East Pakistan
- Party: Bangladesh Awami League
- Parent: Mohammad Anwar Jung Talukdar (father)

Talukdar Mohammad Towhid Jung (Bengali: তালুকদার মোহাম্মদ তৌহিদ জং; born 23 August 1971), also known by his nick name Murad is a Bangladesh Awami League Politician and Former Member of Parliament from Dhaka-19. He was a Member of the Parliamentary Standing Committee for the Ministry of Youth and Sports (Bangladesh).

== Early life ==
Talukdar Mohammad Towhid Jung Murad was born on 23 August 1971 in Dhaka. His father, Mohammad Anwar Jung Talukdar, belonged to the Bengali Muslim Jung family which descended from a line of hereditary aristocratic Taluqdars. His mother, Syeda Lutfun Nahar, belonged to a Bengali Muslim family of Syeds, claiming ancestry back to the Islamic prophet Muhammad.

== Career ==
Murad Jung was elected to Parliament in 2008 from Dhaka-19 as a Bangladesh Awami League candidate acquiring 2,82,412 votes.

== Criticism ==
In 2013, Savar's Rana Plaza collapses, killing more than a thousand because of poor architecture and low quality building materials. Murad Jung tries to keep Sohel Rana, the owner of that plaza safe.
