= Mohammad Habib Hasan =

Bangladeshi politician and Former Member of Parliament

- মোহাম্মদ হাবিব হাসান

Member of Parliament
- In office 12 Nov 2020 – 7 January 2024
- Preceded by: Sahara Khatun
- Succeeded by: Khosru Chowdhury
- Constituency: Dhaka-18

Personal details
- Born: 1 March 1963 (age 63) Dacca, Bengal Presidency
- Party: Bangladesh Awami League
- Spouse: Shamima Habib
- Occupation: Business

Mohammad Habib Hasan (born 1 March 1963) is a Bangladeshi Bangladesh Awami League's politician who was a Member of Parliament for Dhaka-18 Constituency.

== Career ==
Hasan was the Organizing Secretary of Harirampur Union Awami League afterwards became the General Secretary of Greater Uttara Thana Awami League. Mohammad Habib Hasan became the Joint General Secretary of Dhaka city north Awami League for the first time on 2016 and again became senior joint general secretary of Dhaka city north Awami League in November 2020. After the death of the former MP of Dhaka-18 Sahara Khatun on 9 July 2020 Mohammad Habib Hasan was elected a Member of Parliament in the vacant seat of Dhaka-18 constituency, in the by-election held on 12 November 2020.

Hasan lost the 2024 general election to independent candidate Khosru Chowdhury. His brother and former president of Dhaka Ward-1 Awami League, Anwarul Islam, was killed in a clash with protestors in Uttara during the Non-cooperation movement (2024).
