= Sahara Khatun =

Bangladeshi politician (1943–2020)

- সাহারা খাতুন
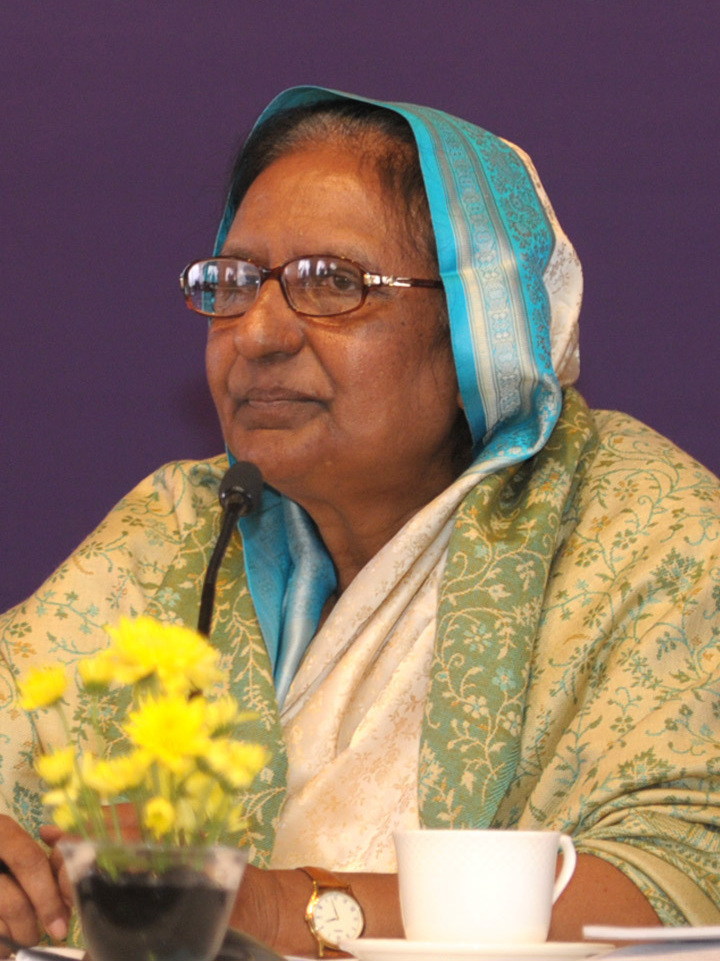
- Khatun in 2012

Minister of Posts and Telecommunications
- In office 15 September 2012 – 21 November 2013
- Prime Minister: Sheikh Hasina
- Preceded by: Rajiuddin Ahmed Raju
- Succeeded by: Rashed Khan Menon

Minister of Home Affairs
- In office 6 January 2009 – 15 September 2012
- Prime Minister: Sheikh Hasina
- Preceded by: Altaf Hossain Chowdhury
- Succeeded by: Mohiuddin Khan Alamgir

Member of the Bangladesh Parliament for Dhaka-18
- In office 6 January 2009 – 9 July 2020
- Preceded by: Redistricted
- Succeeded by: Mohammad Habib Hasan

Personal details
- Born: 1 March 1943 Kurmitola, Bengal, British India
- Died: 9 July 2020 (aged 77) Bangkok, Thailand
- Party: Bangladesh Awami League
- Education: L.L.B
- Occupation: Lawyer and politician

Sahara Khatun (1 March 1943 – 9 July 2020) was a Bangladesh Awami League politician and a cabinet minister. She was the Jatiyo Sangsad member representing the Dhaka-18 constituency, and was the presidium member of the party.

== Early life ==
Khatun was born in Kurmitola in Dhaka on 1 March 1943 to Abdul Aziz and Turjan Nesa. She completed BA and LLB degrees. She was the presidium member of Bangladesh Awami League, founding president of Bangladesh Awami Ainjibi Parishad, and general secretary of Bangladesh Mahila Samity, as well as a member of the International Women Lawyers' Association and the International Women's Alliance. She started her career as a lawyer, and rose to fight cases at the Supreme Court of Bangladesh.

== Political career ==
Khatun was involved in politics since her student life. She entered the national political scene when she contested the 1991 Bangladeshi general election as an Awami League candidate, and was defeated by Khaleda Zia of the Bangladesh Nationalist Party.

Khatun was charged with politically motivated crimes during the caretaker government.

With the exposure received in the run-up to the 2008 Bangladesh general election, Khatun was pitched as an Awami League candidate from the Dhaka-18 constituency. She eventually won the election, and was then appointed as the minister of home affairs of the government of Bangladesh. She took office on 6 January 2009. In a cabinet reshuffle of 2012, she was relieved of her duties as the home minister and made the minister of posts and telecommunications.

=== Tenure as minister ===
Khatun's tenure as minister of home affairs has been marred by the following controversies.

==== BDR mutiny ====
During the 2009 BDR Mutiny, Khatun led the delegation to negotiate with the mutineers. She went inside the campus of the Bangladesh Rifles to stimulate negotiation and to ask the mutineers to put their arms down.

The mutiny resulted in the death of 57 top officials of the army and 3 family members.

==== Extrajudicial killing ====
The Awami League in 2008 had promised in its election manifesto that it would stop all extrajudicial killings if brought to power, and Human Rights Watch observed that the Awami League had failed in its promise.

==== Comment on Janmastami ====
Khatun attracted criticism in August 2010 when she asked the Hindu minority to cut their religious festival Janmastami short so that it would not clash with the Muslim-majority observances of Ramadan, as they coincided with the same time period. She urged the Hindu community not to make loud noises during sunset, when Muslims would be having iftar. Her comments were considered discriminatory, since a limitation on minority celebrations was being imposed for the first time; Hindu festivals had previously coincided with Ramadan in Bangladesh.

== Death ==
Khatun died on 9 July 2020 at the Bumrungrad International Hospital in Bangkok, Thailand, due to COVID-19.
