= Tejgaon College =

College in Bangladesh

- Motto: Be Honest Be Successful
- Type: Private
- Established: 1961
- Academic affiliations: National University, Bangladesh; Dhaka Education Board
- Principal: Professor Shamima Yasmin
- Faculty: 150+
- Location: 16, Indira Road, Farmgate, Dhaka, Bangladesh
- Campus: Urban, 03 ha
- Website: www.tejgaoncollege.bd.com

Tejgaon College (Bengali: তেজগাঁও কলেজ) is a college in Dhaka city, Bangladesh which was founded in 1961. It has 30,000 students.

Tejgaon College is located at Farmgate, at the Dhaka city centre. It had started off as a night college in a school campus at Sadarghat.

It is a university college since it now offers honours and master's courses on 25 to 27 subjects under the National University. Established on over 1-acre (4,000 m^{2}) of land, there are six multi-storeyed buildings, five six-storied buildings and one single-storied building, in addition to various other buildings in the compound.

== History ==
Tejgaon College was established in 1961 under the name Dhaka Night College on the premises of Islamia High School. The founding President of the college was the then Minister of Education, Shariful Islam. Later, the college was relocated to the Madrasa-e-Alia premises through the initiative of Education Minister Mofizuddin.

Subsequently, the college campus was shifted to Tejgaon Polytechnic High School. Afterwards, the campus was relocated to Crown Laundry in Tejgaon. Later, the name Dhaka Night College was changed to Tejgaon College, and the institution was established at Al-Raji Hospital. Later, Principal Tofayel Ahmed Chowdhury established the college as a day college at Indira Road, Farmgate, and the night college was abolished after sometime. The founding Principal of the college was Tofayel Ahmed Chowdhury.

Through the efforts of the educationist Principal Tofayel Ahmed Chowdhury, the college acquired land and constructed buildings at Indira Road, through which the day college attained its full form. At present, it is established as a large private college. Principal Tofayel Ahmed Chowdhury is the true founder of Tejgaon College.

Principal Tofayel Ahmed Chowdhury made a determined effort to provide a permanent home for this college. With the help of the then students, teachers and staff, he purchased a place for the college and hostel at the risk of his life in Farmgate, Dhaka. The construction and development process of the college's own infrastructure was started for the first time by the then Education Minister of the Government of the People's Republic of Bangladesh, Mr. Yusuf Ali, with 12 tons of corrugated iron.

In 1998, Professor Md. Abdur Rashid took over as the Principal. He introduced new subjects such as Honours and Masters. Professor Md. Harun-ur-Rashid took over on 12 April 2022. After this, Professor Shamima Yasmin became the acting Principal in August 2024. The college continues its educational activities with seven of its own buildings at 16 Indira Road, Farmgate .

On 13 April 2009, the principal of Tejgaon College, Abdur Rashid, was arrested for misappropriating 30 million taka and selling fake certificates from 2003 to 2008. On 8 July 2013, four students of the college were injured in clashes with students of the University of Dhaka.

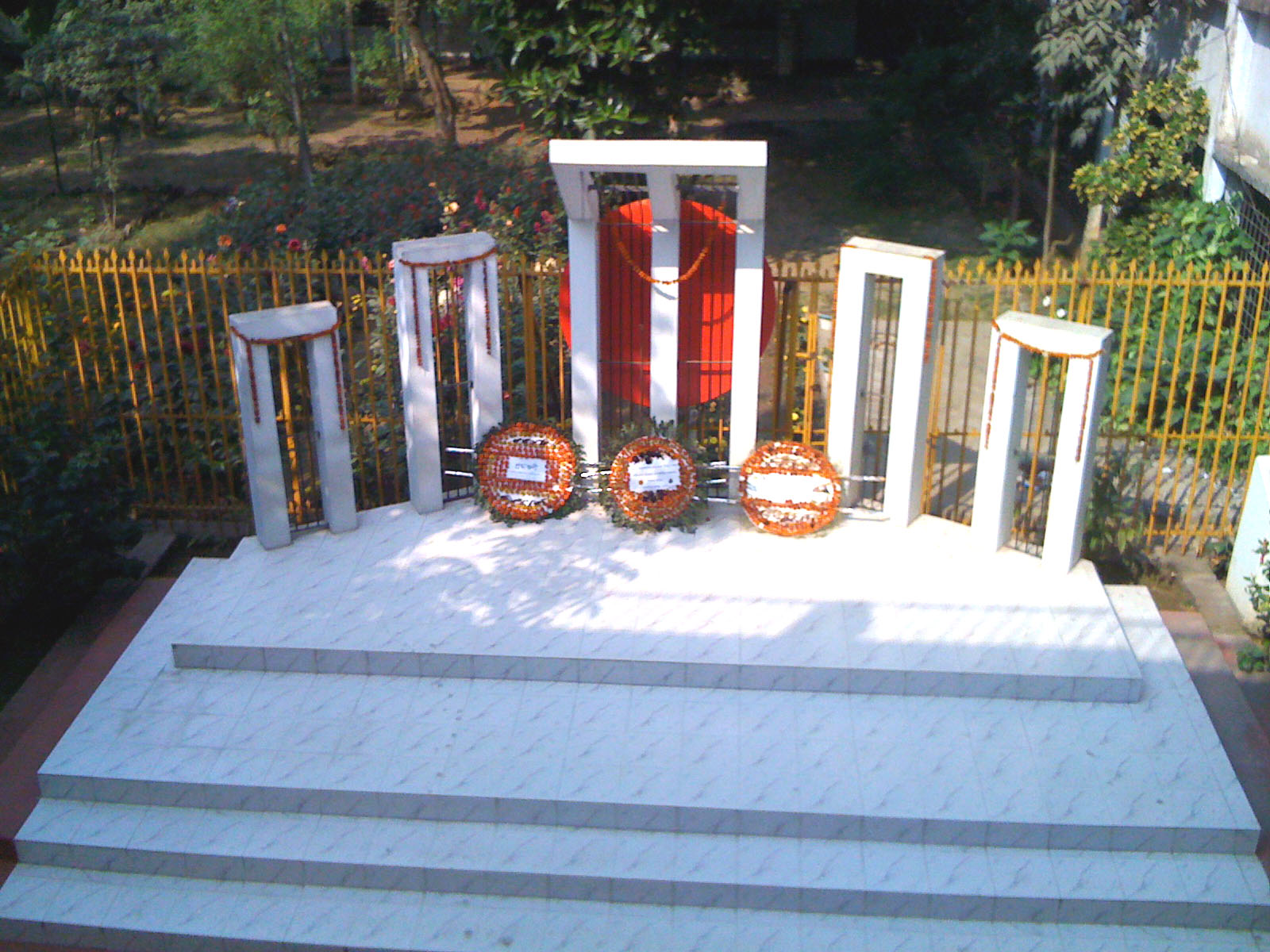
Tejgaon College Shaheed Minar

== Departments ==
=== Professional Honours Courses ===
1. Computer Science & Engineering (CSE).
2. Theater & Media Studies.
3. Tourism & Hospitality Management

=== Honours and Master's courses ===
1. Accounting
2. Biochemistry and Molecular Biology
3. Chemistry
4. Statistics
5. English
6. Finance and Banking
7. Geography and Environment
8. Islamic Studies
9. Management
10. Marketing
11. Mathematics
12. Political Science
13. Psychology
14. Social Work
15. Sociology
16. Social Welfare
17. Islamic History and Culture
18. Bangla
19. Philosophy
20. Physics
21. Zoology
22. Botany

== Co-curricular activities ==
Tejgaon College has several organizations for co-curricular activity.

1. Quality Improvement & International Tourist Club (QIITC)
2. Debate Club
3. Satyan Bose Science Club
4. Sangeet Club
5. BNCC (Bangladesh National Cadet Corps)

== Notable alumni ==
- Shahid Uddin Chowdhury Anee — Politician and member of the Parliament .
- S M Jahangir Hossain — Politician and member of the Parliament .
- Rubya Haider — Bangladeshi Women's cricketer.
- Alamgir — Bangladeshi Actor.
