= Shamsuddoha Khan Majlish =

Bangladeshi politician

- শামসুদ্দোহা খান মজলিশ

Member of Bangladesh Parliament

Personal details
- Party: Awami League

Shamsuddoha Khan Majlish (Bengali: শামসুদ্দোহা খান মজলিশ, romanized: Śāmasuddōhā Khāna Majaliśa) was a member of the Awami League and a former representative for Dhaka-12.

== Career ==
As an Awami League candidate in 1986, Majlish won a seat in parliament for Dhaka-12.

== Personal life ==
Majlish's wife, Selima Khan Majlish, was murdered on 14 June 2011 in Savar by her daughter and her daughter's lover.
