= Malkegaon =

Malkegaon Malkigāon
- Village
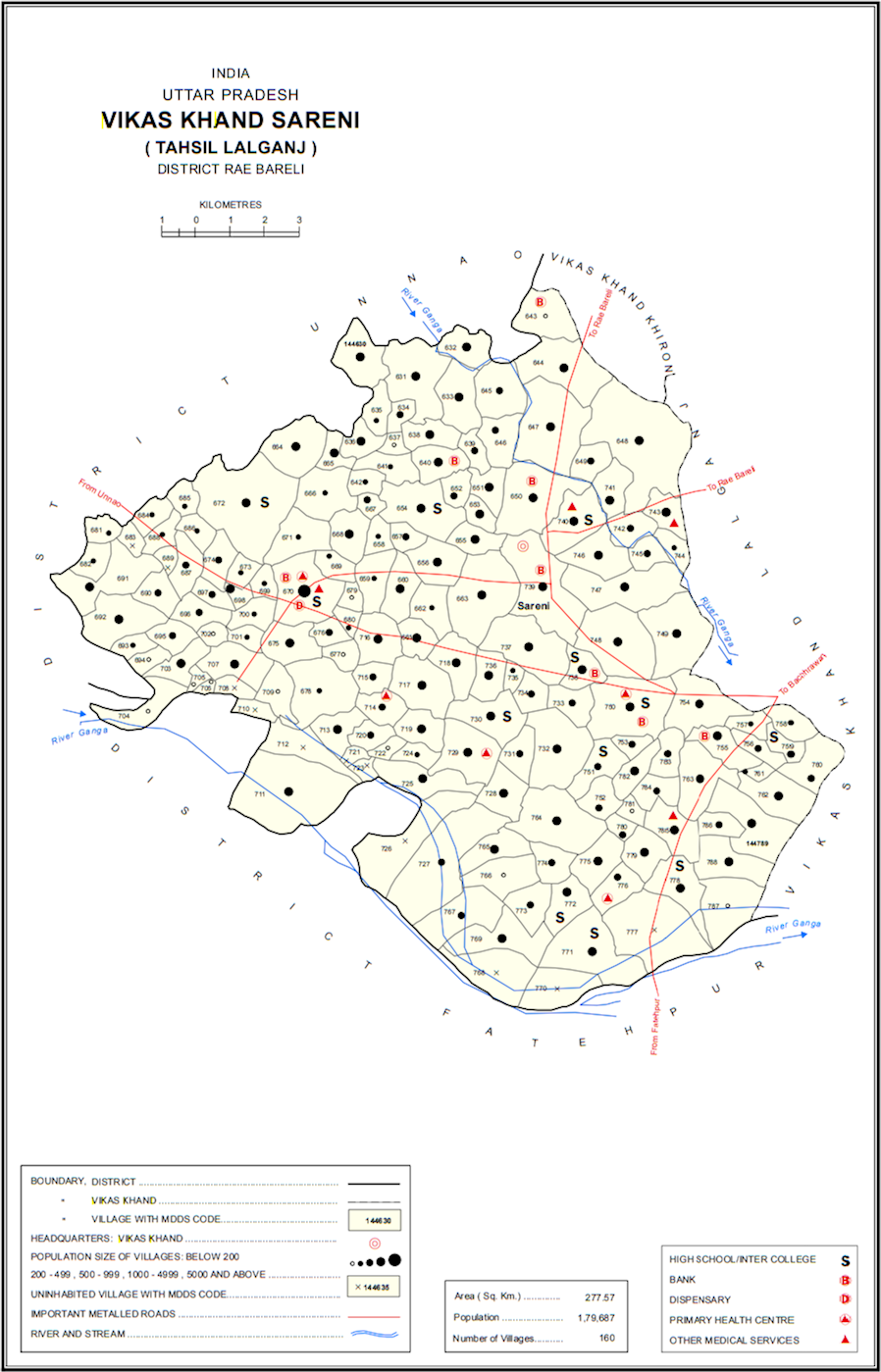
- Map showing Malkegaon (#754) in Sareni CD block

- Location in Uttar Pradesh, India
- Coordinates: 26.109182°N 80.873068°E
- Country: India
- State: Uttar Pradesh
- District: Raebareli

Area
  - Total: 3.058 km^{2} (1.181 sq mi)

Population (2011)
  - Total: 2,951
  - Density: 965.0/km^{2} (2,499/sq mi)

Languages
  - Official: Hindi
- Time zone: UTC+5:30 (IST)
- Vehicle registration: UP-35

Malkegaon, also spelled Malkigaon or Malke Gaon, is a village in Sareni block of Rae Bareli district, Uttar Pradesh, India. It is located 13 km from Lalganj, the tehsil headquarters. As of 2011, it has a population of 2,951 people, in 504 households. It has one primary school and no healthcare facilities, and it hosts a weekly haat but not a permanent market. The haat is held on Wednesdays and Saturdays and mostly involves the sale of cloth and vegetables. It is the headquarters of a nyaya panchayat, which also includes 13 other villages.

The 1951 census recorded Malkegaon (as "Malke Gaon") as comprising 4 hamlets, with a total population of 1,240 people (589 male and 651 female), in 233 households and 200 physical houses. The area of the village was given as 737 acres. 53 residents were literate, 18 male and 35 female. The village was listed as belonging to the pargana of Sareni and the thana of Sareni.

The 1961 census recorded Malkegaon as comprising 3 hamlets, with a total population of 1,296 people (627 male and 669 female), in 232 households and 213 physical houses. The area of the village was given as 737 acres and it had a post office and medical practitioner at that point. Average attendance of the village haat was about 100 people then.

The 1981 census recorded Malkegaon as having a population of 1,702 people, in 303 households, and having an area of 309.55 hectares. The main staple foods were given as wheat and rice.

The 1991 census recorded Malkegaon (as "Malke Gaon") as having a total population of 2,232 people (1,140 male and 1,092 female), in 354 households and 352 physical houses. The area of the village was listed as 305 hectares. Members of the 0-6 age group numbered 438, or 20% of the total; this group was 54% male (235) and 46% female (203). Members of scheduled castes made up 32% of the village's population, while no members of scheduled tribes were recorded. The literacy rate of the village was 39% (626 men and 249 women). 758 people were classified as main workers (578 men and 180 women), while 1 person was classified as a marginal worker (a woman); the remaining 1,473 residents were non-workers. The breakdown of main workers by employment category was as follows: 303 cultivators (i.e. people who owned or leased their own land); 194 agricultural labourers (i.e. people who worked someone else's land in return for payment); 2 workers in livestock, forestry, fishing, hunting, plantations, orchards, etc.; 7 in mining and quarrying; 0 household industry workers; 69 workers employed in other manufacturing, processing, service, and repair roles; 2 construction workers; 47 employed in trade and commerce; 11 employed in transport, storage, and communications; and 123 in other services.
