= Abdur Razzaq (politician, born 1942) =

Former Minister of Water Resources of Bangladesh

- আব্দুর রাজ্জাক
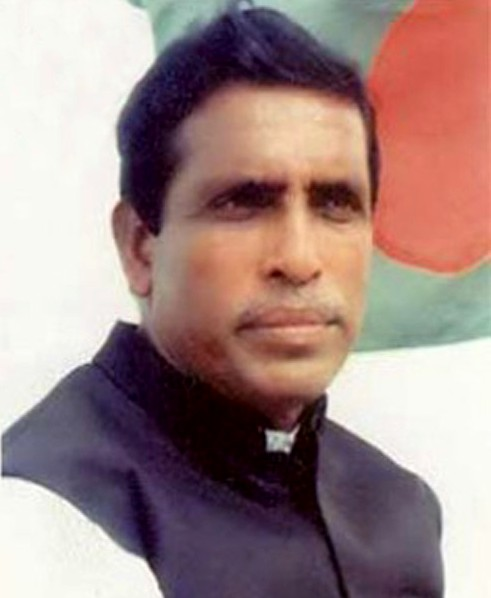

Minister of Water Resources
- In office 23 June 1996 – 15 July 2001
- Prime Minister: Sheikh Hasina
- Preceded by: Majid-ul-Haq
- Succeeded by: L. K. Siddiqi

Member of Parliament
- In office 1996–2011
- Preceded by: Safiqur Rahman Kiran
- Succeeded by: Nahim Razzaq
- In office 1991–1996
- Preceded by: M. A. Reza
- Succeeded by: Safiqur Rahman Kiran
- Constituency: Shariatpur-3

Member of Parliament
- In office 1973–1979
- Succeeded by: Abdul Mannan Sikder
- Constituency: Faridpur-16

6th General Secretary Of Awami League
- In office 29 September 1976 – 24 March 1982
- President: Syeda Zohra Tajuddin; Sheikh Hasina
- Preceded by: Zillur Rahman
- Succeeded by: Syeda Sajeda Chowdhury

Personal details
- Born: 1 August 1942 Damudya, Bengal Presidency, British India
- Died: 23 December 2011 (aged 69) London, England
- Party: Bangladesh Awami League
- Other political affiliations: BAKSAL
- Spouse: Farida Razzaq
- Children: Nahim Razzaq, Fahim Razzaq
- Education: Dhaka College University of Dhaka
- Occupation: Politician and Lawyer

Abdur Razzaq (1 August 1942 – 23 December 2011) was a Bangladeshi politician and member of the Awami League Advisory Council. He was the Minister for Water Resources from 1996 to 2001 in the first Sheikh Hasina Cabinet. He was the chairman of the Parliamentary Standing Committee for the Water Resources Ministry.

== Early life and education ==
Razzaq was born in 1 August 1942 to a middle class business family of South Damudya village under Damudya Upazila of Shariatpur District in the province of Bengal (now Bangladesh) to father Alhaj Imamuddin and mother Begum Akfatun Nesa. His childhood dream was to develop his village into an ideal village where everyone would prosper and be solvent.

Razzaq passed his Secondary School Certificate examination from Damudya Muslim High School in 1958 and Higher Secondary School Certificate examination from Dhaka College in 1960, he then enrolled at University of Dhaka and passed the BA (Honors) in political science and in 1964 he enrolled and passed the MA in political science. Later he passed LLB and enrolled as a lawyer in 1973.

Razzaq married Farida Razzaq in 1973 and is the father of Nahim Razzaq and Fahim Razzaq.

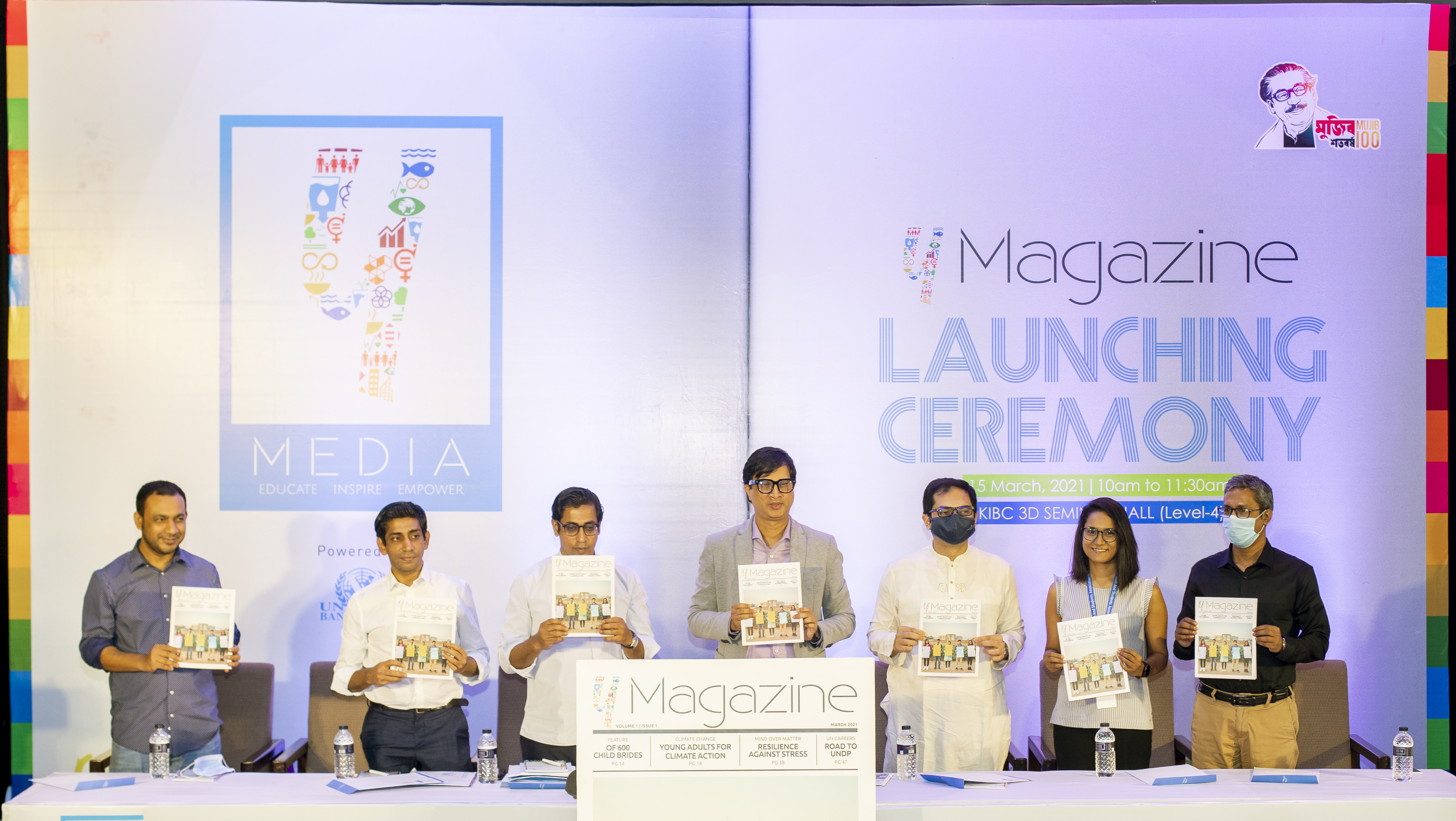
Both sons Nahim Razzaq (3rd from left) and Fahim Razzaq (2nd from left) at the inauguration ceremony of Y Magazine, KIB

== Political career ==
Razzaq started his political career in student life being elected as the secretary of Fazlul Haq Hall Students Union, Dhaka University in 1963. Razzaq emerged as a popular parliamentarian, and took over the responsibilities of different ministries of the Government of Bangladesh.

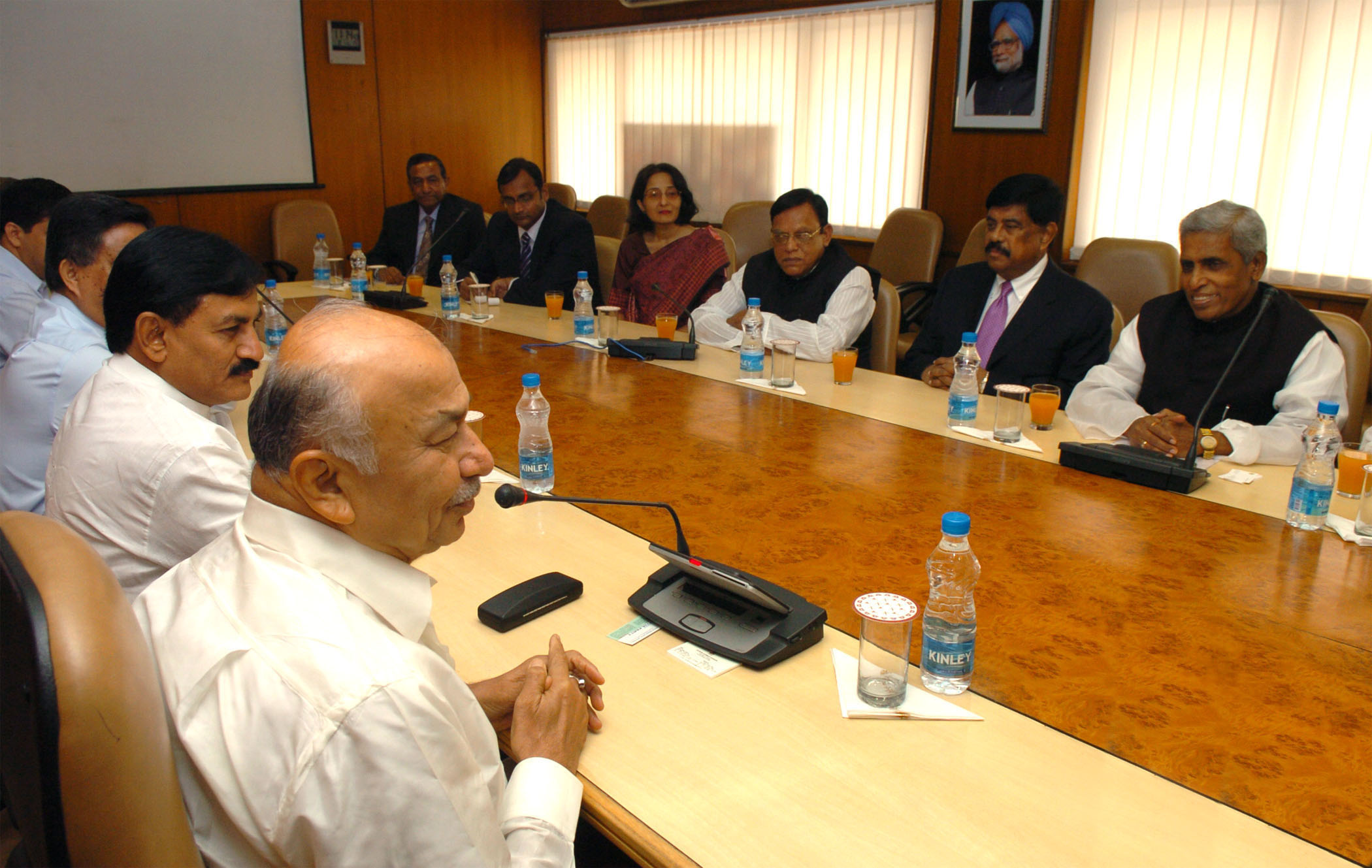
Chairman of the Standing Committee for the Ministry of Water Resources, Abdur Razzaq along with Indian Power Minister, Sushilkumar Shinde, in New Delhi, India

Razzaq was the member of the Provincial Assembly in 1970 and elected member of the parliament of the independent Bangladesh in 1973, 1991, 1996, 2001 and 2008. In 9th parliamentary election Razzaq was elected Member of Parliament from Shariatpur-3 (Bhedarganj-Damudya-Gosairhat) constituency getting 102,925 votes while his nearest rival K M Hemayet Ullah Awrangajeb of BNP got 52,672 votes. Chronology of Razzaq's political career:

- 1959–1960: Student union executive member.
- 1960–1962: Central Member of East Pakistan Students League.
- 1962–1963: Unopposed Assistant General Secretary of Fazlul Huq Hall (University of Dhaka).
- 1963–1965: Assistant Joint Secretary (AGS) of Bangladesh Chhatra League and also the elected General Secretary of Fazlul Huq Hall Students Union.
- 1965–1967: General Secretary of Bangladesh Chhatra League for two terms.
- 1969–1972: Chief of Awami Volunteer Core.
- 1972–1975: Organizing Secretary of Bangladesh Awami League.
- 1975–1978: Secretary of BAKSAL.
- 1978–1981: Secretary-General of Bangladesh Awami League.
- 1983–1991: General Secretary of post-1983 BAKSAL.
- 1991–2008: Presidium member of Bangladesh Awami League.
- 2008–2009: Member of Advisory council of Bangladesh Awami League.

=== Imprisonment ===
Razzaq was arrested many times and jailed as a political prisoner. The first time he was sent to jail during 1964–65 by Ayub Khan Government where he appeared his masters examination. Later he was imprisoned from 1967 to 1969 for participating in the 6-Point Movement. After the Liberation War '71, during the Military Coup and the Assassination of Sheikh Mujibur Rahman in 1975 to 1978; Razzaq was yet again arrested along with several other followers of Sheikh Mujibur Rahman. During Ershad regime he was also imprisoned in 1987.

=== Achievements ===
- Struggle for the establishment of Six point movement during Pakistani regime.
- One of the leading organizers of liberation war and participating liberation war.
- As a minister of water resource 1996–2001, signing of Sharing of Ganges Waters Treaty between Bangladesh & India.
- Led a 10-member parliamentary team's fact-finding mission on Tipaimukh Dam project and visited India during July–August 2009. On return from India, Razzaq presented a report to the parliament where he said that the Indian ministers had assured them that they would not implement any project to harm Bangladesh.

== Death ==
Razzaq died from kidney and liver damage on 23 December 2011 in London.
