= Idilpur Union =

Idilpur Union ইদিলপু ইউনিয়ন
- Union
- Location in Bangladesh
- Coordinates: 23.0765°N 90.4318°E
- Country: Bangladesh
- Division: Dhaka Division
- District: Shariatpur District
- Upazila: Gosairhat Upazila
- Time zone: UTC+6 (BST)
- Postal code: 8050
- Website: bangladesh.gov.bd/maps/images/Dhaka/Gosairhat.gif

Idilpur Union (Bengali: ইদিলপুর ইউনিয়ন) is a union parishad of Gosairhat Upazila under Shariatpur District in the Dhaka Division, southern-central Bangladesh beside the Jayanti River. In the past Idilpur or Idalpur or Edilpur pargana was the largest zamindari of Faridpur District and before that it was one of the 5 important parganas of Bakarganj during the British Raj.

== History ==
=== Edilpur Copperplate ===
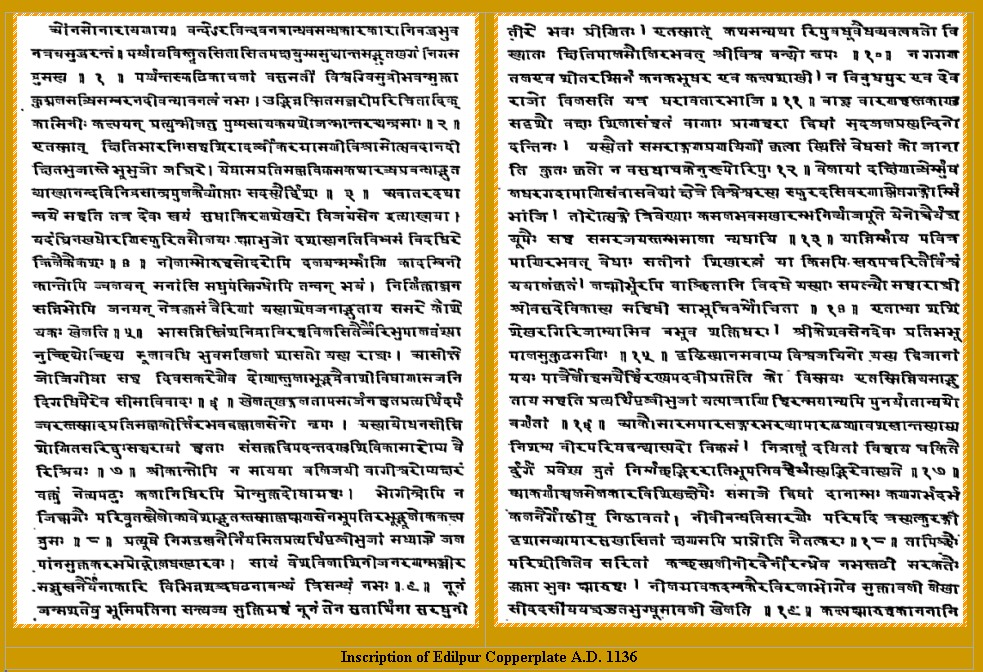
Edilpur Copperplate

In Bengal and Indian history Idilpur is famous for copper plate named Edilpur Copperplate of Kesava Sena found in the Adilpur or Edilpur pargana in 1838 AD and to have been acquired by the Asiatic Society of Bengal, but now it is missing from collection. An account of the plate was published in the Dacca Review and Epigraphic Indica. The copperplate inscription written Sanskrit and in Ganda character dated 3rd jyaistha of 1136 samval which represents 1079 AD. The Asiatic Society's proceeding for January 1838, an account of the copperplate describes that 3 villages were given to a Brahman in the 3rd year of Kaesava Sana. These three villages cannot be identified now, and thought it is impossible enough that they have been long ago washed away by Meghna, which flows past Edilpur paragana. The grant was given with the landlord rights, receives the power of punishing the chandrabhandas or sundarbans, a race that lived in the forest. It records the grant of the land in the village of Leliya in the Kumaratalaka mandala situated in shatata-padamavati-visaya. The copperplate of Kaesava Sana tells that the king Vallal Sena carried away the goddesses of fortune for the enemies on palanquins (Shivaka) supported by staff made of elephant tusk. It also claims that his father Lakhman Sena (1179–1205) erects pillars of victory and sacrificial posts at Benaras and Allahabad and Adon Coast of South Sea. The plate describes the villages with smooth fields growing excellent paddy also noticed about the dancing and music in the ancient Bengal and ladies of that period used to adorn their bodies with blooming flowers. The Edilpur copperplate of Kaesava Sena records that the king made a grant in favor of Nitipathaka Isvaradeva Sarman for the inscae of the subha-varsha.

=== Mughal Empire, British Raj and Pakistan Period ===
In 1582 in the reign of Emperor Akbar, the province of Bengal was formed into 33 sarkars (fiscal sub division) and 682 parganas, and Edilpur area appears to have been included within the sarkar of Muhammad Abud. It was having belonged to one Raballabh in 1165 (1758-59 AD) and having borne a revenue of £4701. In 1765 AD the diwani of Bengal were awarded to British East India Company, Idilpur or Idalpur was administered from Dacca collectorate and later under Bakarganj. After abolishing pargana system by Cornwallis administration, Idilpur zamindari were given permanent settlement. In 1789, Chaudhuris named Golam Ali Chowdhury, Golok Roy Chaudhary and others were zamindars of Idalpur pargana. The zamindari was attached to the collector for arrears and later was sold to Mohini Mohan Tagore of Calcutta (Grand father of Rabindranath Tagore) in 1812. For some period Idalpur was under civil administration of Faridpur and land administration of Bakarganj at a time. Idilpur came under Madaripur subdivision of Bakerganj district in 1854 and was separated along with Madaripur subdivision from Bakarganj district and annexed with Faridpur district in 1873. During Pakistan period under the Basic Democracy Order of 1959 local government bodies Union Council later Union Parishad after liberation of Bangladesh were formed and Idilpur was made Union parishad. Gosairhat came into existence as a thana in 1921 after independence of Bangladesh and Idilpur Union worked under new Shariatpur District in 1984 along with Gosairhat Upazila. Sushil Chandra Roychowdhury of the Idilur, Ghosh Roychowdhury Zamindari family, became the inventor of the Automatic Time Switch in 1933 in Calcutta.

== Geography ==
Idilpur is located at 23.0765°N 90.4318°E. It is bounded on the north by Shamontasar union, on the south by Nalmuri union and Muladi Upazila, on the east by Gosairhat union and Kuchaipatty union, on the west by Nagerpara union and Kalkini Upazila of Madaripur District.

== Demography ==
According to the census of 2001, Idilpur had a population of 31,612 in 6953 square meter area ( male-15904, Female-15708) makes the largest union of Gosairhat Upazila in terms of population.

In 1872, the population of Idilpur pargana was 104,000 in 242.79 square miles (628.8 km^{2}) area, 501 estates, land revenue £7977.18 within the jurisdiction of the courts at Madaripur and Daulatkhan.

== Economy ==
Dasherjangal bazaar and hat, Dasherjangal Goo haat (cattle market) are important marketplace. Main source of economy is agriculture, fishing, livestock and business. Rice, paddy, chilly, jute and paan are main crops of Idilpur.

== Administration ==
Idilpur Union Parishad is a local government body consists of 9 wards is run by a Union Parishad Chairman is elected by people's vote in every four years. The land administration of this union is served by a Union Land Office. Idilpur is divided into villages or mouzas named Dasherjangal, Mohishkandi, Khordajangal, Moheswarpatty, Dhipur, Char Dhipur, Benotya, Tar satmatia, Char Satmatia, Tar goalkua, Char goalkua, Basudevchap and Machuakhali.

== Education ==
As of 2001 census average literacy rate of Gosairhat upazila is 40.20%. There are 12 government primary schools, 8 non-government registered primary schools (from grades 1 to 5), 1 girls' high schools (from grades 6 to 10), one degree college (from grades 11 to tertiary) and 2 madrasahs in this union.

Notable educational institutions:

- Idilpur Secondary Girls' High School
- Shamsul Rahman College
- Idilpur Dakhil Madrasha.
