= Mia Nuruddin Ahmed Apu =

Bangladeshi politician

- মিয়া নুরুদ্দিন আহাম্মেদ অপু
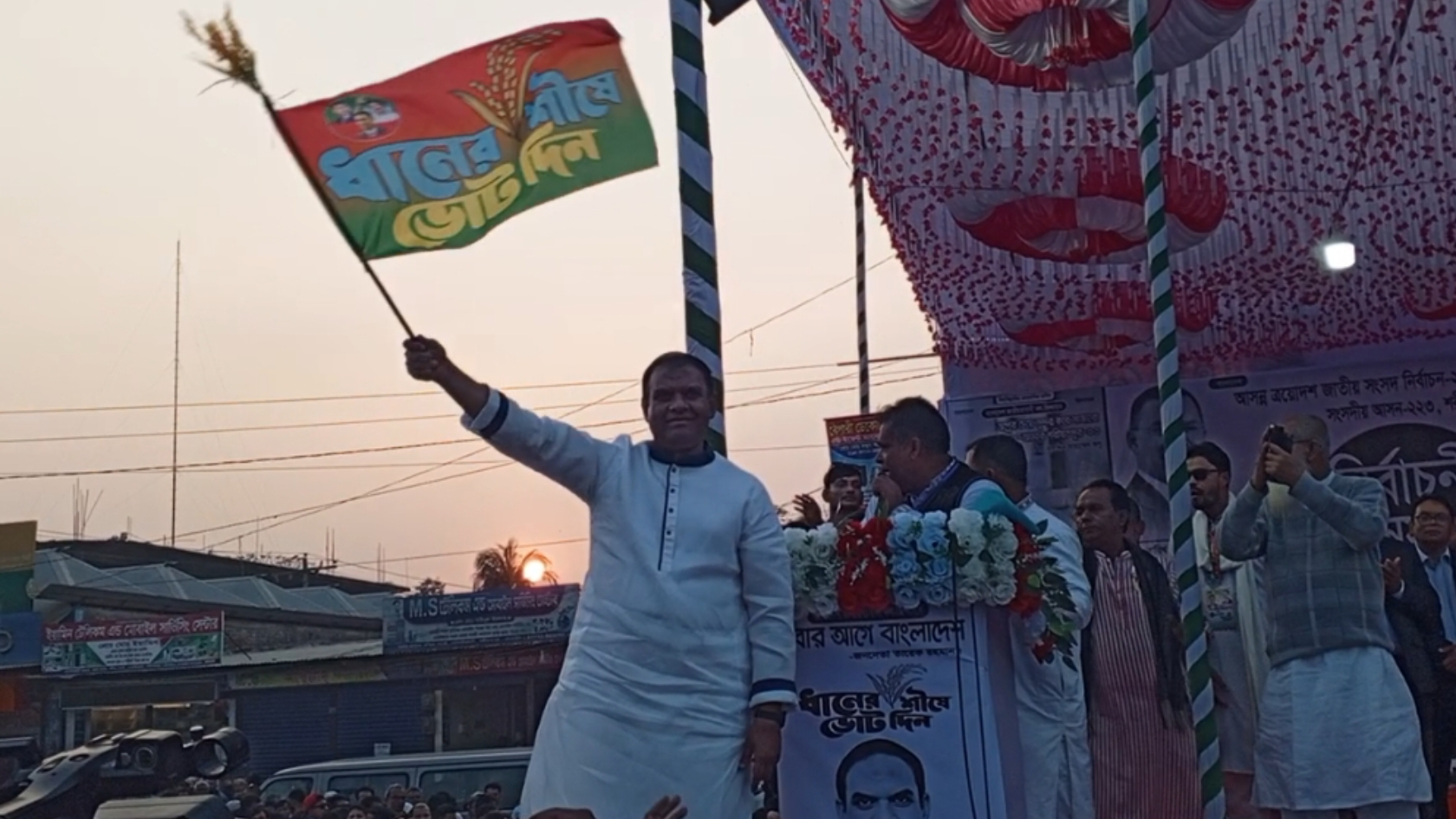
- Apu in 2026

Member of the Bangladesh Parliament for Shariatpur-3
- Incumbent
- Assumed office 17 February 2026
- Preceded by: Nahim Razzaq

Personal details
- Born: 1 October 1974 (age 52) Gosairhat Upazila, Shariatpur District
- Party: Bangladesh Nationalist Party

Mia Nuruddin Ahmed Apu is a Bangladeshi politician of the Bangladesh Nationalist Party. He is currently serving as a Member of Parliament from Shariatpur-3.

He was appointed as a whip of the 13th Jatiya Sangsad by the president.

== Early life ==
Mia Noor Uddin Ahmed Apu was born on 1 October 1974 in Kodalpur Union, Gosairhat Upazila, Shariatpur District.

== Political career ==
Apu has been involved in politics for many years. He previously served as the private secretary to Tarique Rahman, acting chairman of the BNP.

He contested the 11th Jatiya Sangsad election in 2018 from Shariatpur-3 as the BNP candidate.

In the 13th parliamentary election held in 2026, he was elected from Shariatpur-3 constituency as a BNP candidate, defeating his nearest rival from Bangladesh Jamaat‑e‑Islami.
