= AKM Enamul Haque Shamim =

Bangladeshi politician

AKM Enamul Hoque Shameem
- এ কে এম এনামুল হক শামীম
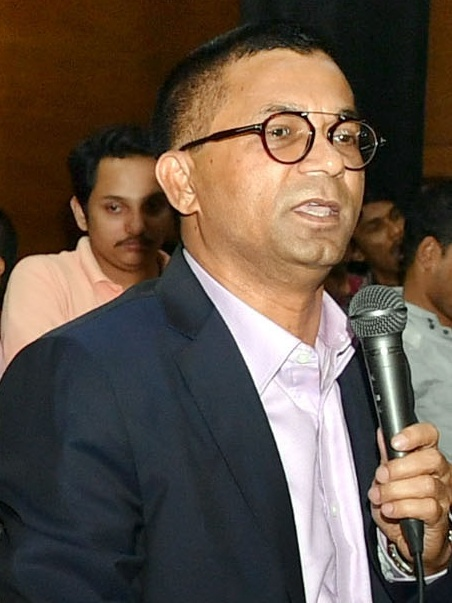
- Shamim in 2019

Member of the Bangladesh Parliament for Shariatpur-2
- In office 30 January 2019 – 6 August 2024
- Preceded by: Shawkat Ali
- Succeeded by: Safiqur Rahman Kiran

Deputy Minister of Water Resources
- In office 7 January 2019 – 11 January 2024
- Prime Minister: Sheikh Hasina
- Succeeded by: Zaheed Farooque

President of Bangladesh Chhatra League
- Leader: Sheikh Hasina
- Preceded by: Mainuddin Hossain Chowdhury
- Succeeded by: Bahadur Bepari

Personal details
- Born: 10 November 1965 (age 60) Shariatpur, East Pakistan, Pakistan
- Party: Bangladesh Awami League
- Relations: AKM Aminul Haque (Brother)
- Education: Dhaka Residential Model College; Jahangirnagar University

AKM Enamul Hoque Shameem (born 10 November 1965) is a Bangladesh Awami League politician and a former Jatiya Sangsad member representing the Shariatpur-2 constituency. He served as deputy minister of the Ministry of Water Resources from 2019 to 2024.

== Early life and education ==
Shameem was born in 10 November 1965 to Bengali Muslim parents, Abul Hashem Miah and Begum Ashrafunnesa, in the village of Malatkandi in Bhedarganj, Faridpur district, East Pakistan (now Shariatpur District, Bangladesh). He completed his education at the A. M. High School in Noakhali and Dhaka Residential Model College. He graduated from Jahangirnagar University.

== Career ==
Shameem was voted VP of JUCSU (Jahangirnagar University Central Student Union) from 1989 to 1991. He led the Bangladesh Chhatra League (student league) as the President from 1994 to 1998.

Shameem was targeted by gunmen in Dhaka in June 2014. He suffered a gunshot wound in the incident. He was the member of the Awami League central committee.

Shameem was elected to Parliament on 30 December 2018 from Shariatpur-2 as an Awami League candidate. He contested against the Bangladesh Nationalist Party candidate Shafiqur Rahman Kiran. He was appointed Deputy Minister of Water Resources.

In August 2022, Shameem was part of Bangladesh's ministerial delegation to the 38th meeting of the Bangladesh–India Joint Rivers Commission in New Delhi. This was significant because it was the first ministerial-level JRC meeting in 12 years. The negotiations covered the Kushiyara River, Feni River, Ganges water utilization and the long-running Teesta water-sharing issue. The two countries finalized the text of an interim water-sharing MoU concerning the Kushiyara River.

During his tenure at the Ministry of Water Resources, Shameem was involved in the government's coastal protection programme. In July 2020, he announced four sustainable embankment projects coastal areas in southwestern Bangladesh. In the Padma River right-bank protection project at Naria–Jajira in Shariatpur, he addressed riverbank erosion, including protection works and identified erosion-prone areas as a priority and described dredging, river training and bank-protection works as components of the government's river-management strategy. Shameem also participated in policy discussions concerning the implementation of Bangladesh Delta Plan 2100, including programmes addressing long-term water management, climate resilience and investment planning.

During flash floods affecting the haor region in 2022, Shameem participated in the government's response and said that Water Development Board personnel were working with local administrations and agricultural authorities to protect the Boro harvest. In April 2022, he stated that approximately 90 percent of the crop in the affected haor areas had been harvested.

In February 2020, Shameem inaugurated an electricity connection serving remote char communities in Shariatpur through a submarine cable beneath the Padma River. The project initially connected around 500 consumers in Charatra and Nawapara unions and was part of a wider programme intended to serve approximately 20,000 consumers in remote areas of Shariatpur, Chandpur and Munshiganj.

In October 2016, Shameem was appointed an organising secretary of the Bangladesh Awami League following the party's 20th National Council, having previously served as a member of its Central Working Committee. He was one of two new organising secretaries appointed to the committee and was subsequently assigned responsibility for the party's organisational activities in the Chittagong Division.

During the 2017 Rohingya refugee crisis, it was announced that Shameem would lead a three-member Awami League central delegation to the affected areas hosting Rohingya refugees in the Chittagong Division. The delegation also included the party's Relief and Social Welfare Secretary Sujit Roy Nandi and Deputy Publicity Secretary Aminul Islam Amin. The delegation visited refugee settlements and participated in the distribution of relief in coordination with local political representatives. Later that month, Shameem publicly called for implementation of the five-point proposal presented by the Bangladeshi government at the United Nations concerning the Rohingya crisis.

Shameem is a member of the Trustee board of Stamford University. He is the founder and president of Port City International University.

== Personal life ==
Shameem's brother AKM Aminul Haque is a retired Major General of the Bangladesh Army. He has two daughters.
