= Shariatpur-3 =

Constituency of Bangladesh's Jatiya Sangsad

Coordinates: 23.10°N 90.45°E

- Constituency for the Jatiya Sangsad
- District: Shariatpur District
- Division: Dhaka Division
- Electorate: 255,295 (2018)

Current constituency
- Created: 1984
- Party: Bangladesh Nationalist Party
- Member: Mia Nuruddin Ahmed Apu
- Created from: Faridpur-16
- ← 222 Shariatpur 2 224 Sunamganj-1 →

Shariatpur-3 is a constituency represented in the Jatiya Sangsad (National Parliament) of Bangladesh since 2026 by Mia Nuruddin Ahmed Apu of the Bangladesh Nationalist Party.

== Boundaries ==
The constituency encompasses Damudya and Gosairhat upazilas and the Bhedarganj Thana portion of Bhedarganj Upazila, all in Shariatpur District. Bhedarganj Thana consists of Bhedarganj Municipality and Chhaygaon, Mahisar, Naryanpur, and Rambhadrapur union parishads.

== History ==
The constituency was created in 1984 from the Faridpur-16 constituency when the former Faridpur District was split into five districts: Rajbari, Faridpur, Gopalganj, Madaripur, and Shariatpur.

Ahead of the 2008 general election, the Election Commission redrew constituency boundaries to reflect population changes revealed by the 2001 Bangladesh census. The 2008 redistricting altered the boundaries of the constituency.

== Members of Parliament ==
Election	Member	Party
1986	Faruque Alam	Jatiya Party
1988	M. A. Reza	
1991	Abdur Razzaq	Bangladesh Krishak Sramik Awami League
Feb 1996	Safiqur Rahman Kiran	
Jun 1996	Abdur Razzaq	Awami League
2012 by-election	Nahim Razzaq	Awami League
2026	Mia Nuruddin Ahmed Apu	Bangladesh Nationalist Party

== Elections ==
=== Elections in the 2010s ===
Nahim Razzaq was re-elected unopposed in the 2014 general election after opposition parties withdrew their candidacies in a boycott of the election.

Abdur Razzaq died in December 2011. Nahim Razzaq, his son, was elected unopposed in February 2012 after the Election Commission disqualified the only other candidate in the by-election scheduled for March 2012.

=== Elections in the 2000s ===
General Election 2008: Shariatpur-3
Party	Candidate	Votes	%	±%
AL	Abdur Razzaq	102,925	64.9	+8.6
BNP	K.M. Hemayet Ullah Auranga	52,672	33.2	−9.8
IAB	Mohammad Manik Mia	2,884	1.8	N/A
Majority		50,253	31.7	+18.4
Turnout		158,481	87.4	+14.7
AL hold				

General Election 2001: Shariatpur-3
Party	Candidate	Votes	%	±%
AL	Abdur Razzaq	125,550	56.3	+8.4
BNP	Md. Shafiqur Rahman Kiron	95,961	43.0	−1.9
Islamic Sashantantrik Andolan	A. Sattar	1,175	0.5	N/A
Independent	Shahidul Haq Shikder Litu	244	0.1	N/A
Majority		29,589	13.3	+10.3
Turnout		222,930	72.7	−5.1
AL hold				

=== Elections in the 1990s ===
General Election June 1996: Shariatpur-3
Party	Candidate	Votes	%	±%
AL	Abdur Razzaq	82,543	47.9	+1.9
BNP	Md. Shafiqur Rahman Kiron	77,339	44.9	+2.6
Jamaat	Mostofa Sawar	6,005	3.5	−5.7
IOJ	Abdus Salam	3,052	1.8	N/A
JP(E)	Md. A. Matin Mian	1,650	1.0	+0.2
Zaker Party	Md. Abdul Latif	793	0.5	−0.6
Democratic Republican Party	Kanchan Kumar Dey	550	0.3	N/A
CPB	Md. Moslem Khan	500	0.3	N/A
Majority		5,204	3.0	−0.7
Turnout		172,432	77.8	+24.8
AL gain from BNP				

General Election 1991: Shariatpur-3
Party	Candidate	Votes	%	±%
BAKSAL	Abdur Razzaq	65,455	46.0	
BNP	S. M. Lutfor Rahman Sarkar	60,128	42.3	
Jamaat	Ali Hussein Madbor	13,049	9.2	
Zaker Party	Gias Uddin Molla	1,564	1.1	
JP(E)	Obaedul Haq	1,072	0.8	
Bangladesh Muslim League (Kader)	Yasin Sarkar	649	0.5	
Independent	Abidur Reza Khan	380	0.3	
Majority		5,327	3.7	
Turnout		142,297	53.0	
BAKSAL gain from				
