= Faruque Alam =

Bangladeshi politician

- ফারুক আলম
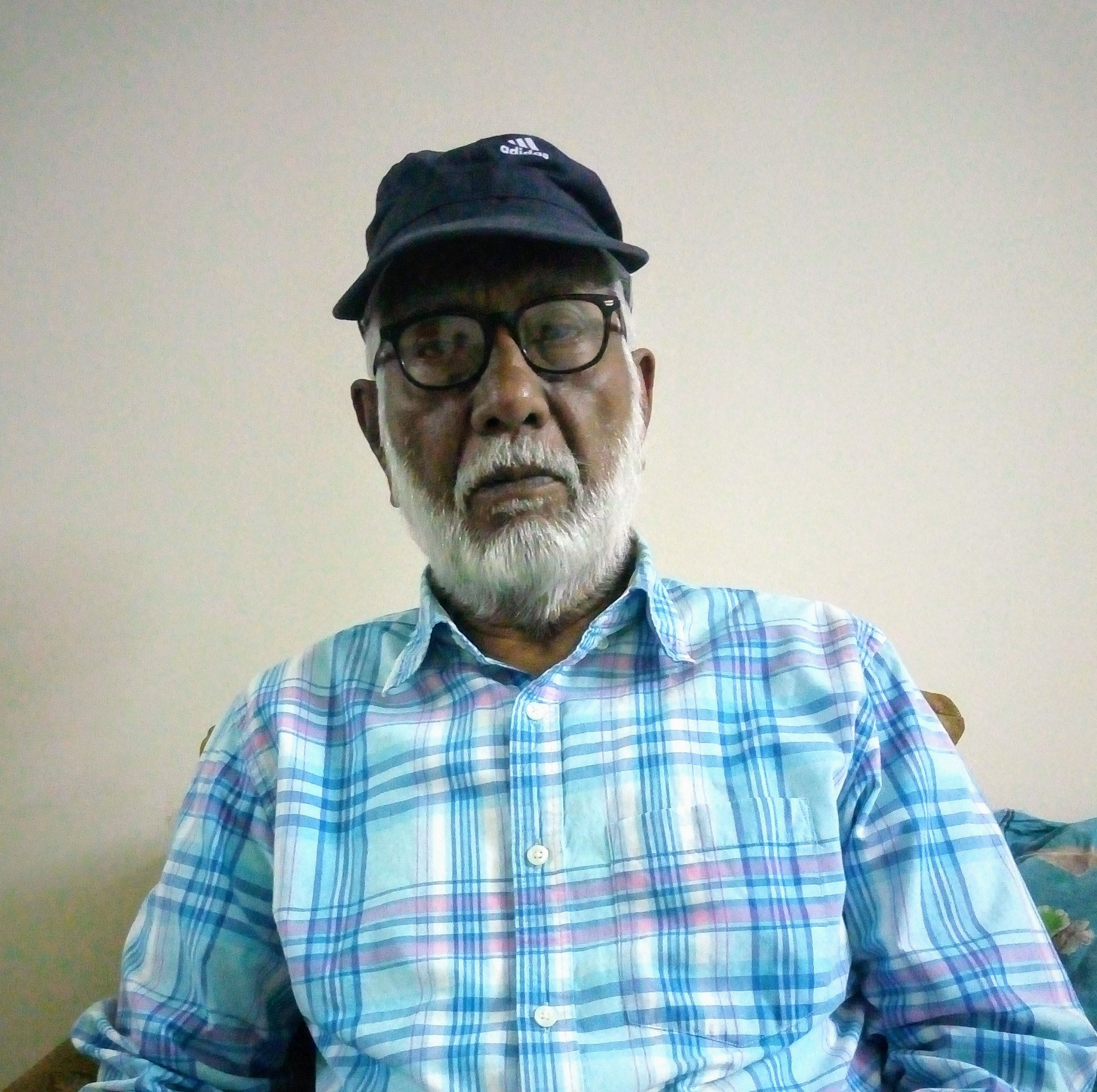

Chairman, Bangladesh Inland Water Transport Corporation
- In office 1991–1994

Member of the Bangladesh Parliament for Shariatpur-3
- In office 7 May 1986 – 3 March 1988
- Preceded by: Position created
- Succeeded by: M. A. Reza

Personal details
- Born: 1 March 1940 Shariatpur, Bengal Province, British India
- Died: 24 May 2020 (aged 80) Dhaka, Bangladesh
- Party: Jatiya Party
- Parents: Sultan Alam Howlader (father); Noor Jahan Begum (mother)
- Occupation: Civil engineer and Wood technologist

Faruque Alam (1 March 1940 – 24 May 2020) was a Bangladeshi civil engineer, wood technologist and the chairman of Bangladesh Inland Water Transport Corporation (BIWTC). He was elected member of parliament from Shariatpur-3 constituency during 1986 Bangladeshi general election under Jatiya Party banner.

== Early life ==
Alam was born on 1 March 1940 at Damudya Upazila in Shariatpur District of the then British Raj (now Bangladesh) to Sultan Alam Howlader and Noor Jahan Begum. He completed his early education from Dhaka and studied Wood Technology in Swedish-Pakistan Institute of Technology from 1959 to 1963. He was admitted to Erik Dahlbergs College of Engineering at Jonkoping, Sweden in 1966 and obtained his graduation in Civil Engineering in 1970.

== Career ==
Alam started his career at Bangladesh Forest Industries Development Corporation in 1970 and served as general manager until 1978. He was elected member of parliament from Shariatpur-3 constituency during 1986 Bangladeshi general election under Jatiya Party banner. He also served as the chairman of BIWTC from 1991 to 1994.
