= Shariatpur-2 =

Constituency of Bangladesh's Jatiya Sangsad

Coordinates: 23.30°N 90.41°E

- Constituency for the Jatiya Sangsad
- District: Shariatpur District
- Division: Dhaka Division
- Electorate: 310,343 (2018)

Current constituency
- Created: 1984
- Party: Bangladesh Nationalist Party
- Member: Safiqur Rahman Kiran
- ← 221 Shariatpur 1 223 Shariatpur-3 →

Shariatpur-2 is a constituency represented in the Jatiya Sangsad (National Parliament) of Bangladesh since 2026 by Safiqur Rahman Kiran of the Bangladesh Nationalist Party.

== Boundaries ==
The constituency encompasses Naria Upazila and the Sakhipur Thana portion of Bhedarganj Upazila. Sakhipur Thana consists of Arshi Nagar, Char Bhaga, Char Kumaria, Char Census, Dhakhin Tarabunia, Digar Mahishkhali, Kachikata, Sakhipur, and Tarabunia union parishads.

== History ==
The constituency was created in 1984 from the Faridpur-15 constituency when the former Faridpur District was split into five districts: Rajbari, Faridpur, Gopalganj, Madaripur, and Shariatpur.

Ahead of the 2008 general election, the Election Commission redrew constituency boundaries to reflect population changes revealed by the 2001 Bangladesh census. The 2008 redistricting altered the boundaries of the constituency.

== Members of Parliament ==
Election	Member	Party
1986	TM Giasuddin Ahmed	Jatiya Party
1991	Shawkat Ali	Awami League
Feb 1996	Khandaker Abdul Jalil	Bangladesh Nationalist Party
Jun 1996	Shawkat Ali	Awami League
2018	AKM Enamul Haque Shamim	Awami League
2026	Safiqur Rahman Kiran	Bangladesh Nationalist Party

== Elections ==
=== Elections in the 2010s ===
Shawkat Ali was re-elected unopposed in the 2014 general election after opposition parties withdrew their candidacies in a boycott of the election.

=== Elections in the 2000s ===
General Election 2008: Shariatpur-2
Party	Candidate	Votes	%	±%
AL	Shawkat Ali	114,808	58.9	+10.8
BNP	Md. Shofiqur Rahaman	80,096	41.1	+22.4
Majority		34,712	17.8	+0.1
Turnout		194,904	86.3	+18.2
AL hold				

General Election 2001: Shariatpur-2
Party	Candidate	Votes	%	±%
AL	Shawkat Ali	48,578	48.1	−11.1
Independent	Md. Sultan Mahmud	30,712	30.4	N/A
BNP	TM Giasuddin Ahmed	18,861	18.7	−6.4
Independent	Abul Basar Dewan	2,123	2.1	N/A
Independent	Sheikh Shabuddin	230	0.2	N/A
BKA	Md. Azam Khan	222	0.2	−0.1
IJOF	Munsi Zakir Hossain	191	0.2	N/A
Majority		17,866	17.7	−16.5
Turnout		100,917	68.1	−4.9
AL hold				

=== Elections in the 1990s ===
General Election June 1996: Shariatpur-2
Party	Candidate	Votes	%	±%
AL	Shawkat Ali	48,753	59.2	−2.9
BNP	TM Giasuddin Ahmed	20,626	25.1	−6.3
JP(E)	Zakir Hossain Munshi	8,191	9.9	N/A
Jamaat	Syed Habibur Rahman	1,744	2.1	+1.8
IOJ	Hafez Shawkat Ali	1,722	2.1	N/A
Zaker Party	Mollah Gias Uddin Ahmmed	804	1.0	+1.0
Gano Forum	Begum Julekha Hoque	273	0.3	N/A
BKA	Mohammad Azam Khan	226	0.3	N/A
Majority		28,127	34.2	+3.5
Turnout		82,339	73.0	+29.7
AL hold				

General Election 1991: Shariatpur-2
Party	Candidate	Votes	%	±%
AL	Shawkat Ali	44,327	62.1	
BNP	Harun Or Rashid	22,408	31.4	
Independent	TM Giasuddin Ahmed	1,564	2.2	
Zaker Party	Ohed Bisi	1,441	2.0	
Jatiya Oikkya Front	Dewan Sultan Mahmud	832	1.2	
BAKSAL	Harun Rashid	593	0.8	
Jamaat	Syed Habibur Rahman	237	0.3	
Majority		21,919	30.7	
Turnout		71,402	43.3	
AL gain from JP(E)				
