= Edilpur Copperplate =

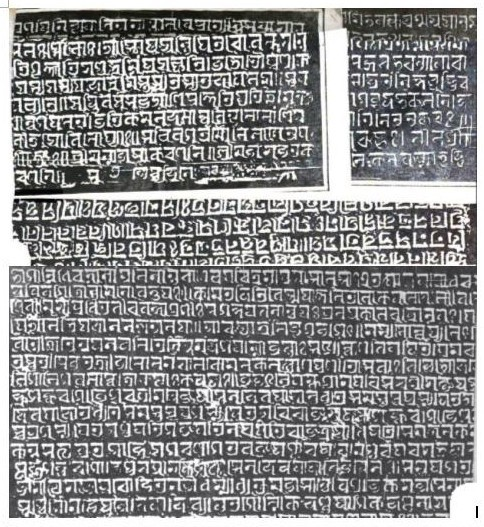
Kesavasena Copperplate

Edilpur Copperplate (Bengali: ইদিলপুর তাম্রলিপি) is an Indian copperplate. It was found in a char land in Edilpur zamindari under Shariatpur District (part of Undivided India) about 120 miles (190 km) directly east of Calcutta. Baboo Conoylal Tagore of Tagore zamindari presented the plate to the Asiatic Society of Bengal in 1838. It later disappeared from the collection. The plate is made of copper and was sharply etched. The plate could have long been buried. A seal depicted an elaborately executed figure of Siva. The character of this inscription is less simple than the earlier alphabets of Pala dynasty. It is strictly in Gaur script which evolved into modern written Bengali. When the first font of Bengali type was prepared, the letters were made after the model of the running hand or written instead of this (the print hand).

== History ==
In Bengal and India copper plate inscriptions (tamarashasana), usually record grants of land or lists of royal lineages carrying the royal seal, many of which have been found. These inscriptions were legal documents such as title-deeds that were etched on a cave or temple wall, were then secreted in a safe place such as within the walls or foundation of a temple, or hidden in stone caches in fields. The earliest authenticated plates were issued by the Pallava dynasty kings in the 4th century A.D. The use of copper plate inscriptions was for several centuries the primary source of legal records. This is the first copperplate record of a grant by the Sena Dynasty.

== Significance ==
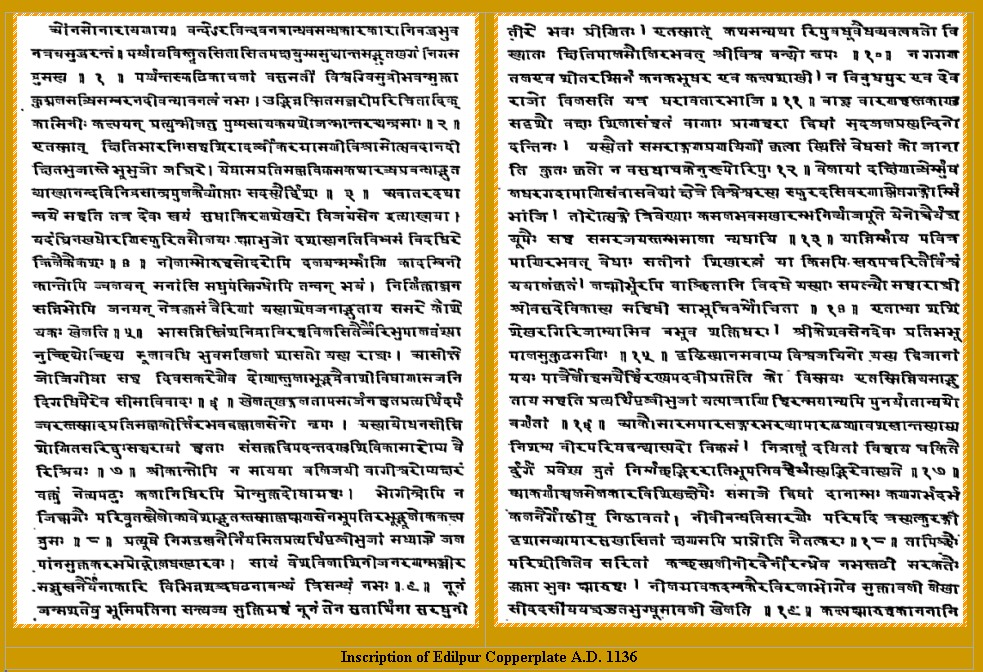
Edilpur Copperplate

Edilpur copperplate inscriptions play an important role in the reconstruction of the history of Bengal. An account of the plate was published in the Dacca Review and Epigraphic Indica. The copperplate inscription written Sanskrit and in Gauda character was dated 3rd jYaistha of 1136 Samval or 1079 A.D.

== Interpretation ==
The Asiatic Society's proceedings for January 1838, include an account of the Edilpur plate that claimed that 3 villages were given to a Brahman named Iswara Deva Sarma, of the Vatsa tribe, of the villages of Bagule Bettogata and Udyamuna situated between four equally unknown places in Banga, or Bengal in the 3rd year of Keshab Sen. The grant was given with the landlord rights, receives the power of punishing the chandabhandas (shandabhandas) or sundarbans, a tribe that lived in the forest. The copperplate claims that Ballal Sena's father Lakhman Sena erected pillars of victory and sacrificial posts at Benaras, Allahabad, and Jagannatha, although D. Liston speculated that this may have happened only in the author's imagination.

== See also ==
- Sena dynasty
- History of Bengal
- History of India
- idilpur Union
