= Basudeb Chap =

- Location in Bangladesh
- Coordinates: 23°03′N 90°25′E
- Country: Bangladesh
- Division: Barisal Division
- District: Barisal District
- Time zone: UTC+6 (Bangladesh Time)

Basudeb Chap is a village of Gosairhat Upazila under Shariatpur District in the Dhaka Division of southern-central Bangladesh.

== See also ==
Gosairhat Upazila
