= AFM Nurul Haque Hawladar =

Bangladeshi politician

- এ এফ এম নুরুল হক হাওলাদার

Member of the Bangladesh Parliament for Faridpur-17
- In office 7 April 1973 – 6 November 1975
- Preceded by: Position created
- Succeeded by: M. A. Kasem

Personal details
- Died: 31 May 1973; Naria, Shariatpur District, Bangladesh
- Political party: Awami League

AFM Nurul Haque Hawladar (died 31 May 1973) was an Awami League politician in Bangladesh and member of parliament for Faridpur-17 (now-defunct).

== Career ==
Hawladar was elected to parliament from Faridpur-17 (present Shariatpur-2) as an Awami League candidate in 1973.

== Death ==
Hawlader was shot dead on 31 May 1973 in his house in Naria, Shariatpur District.
