= Ibrahim Khalil (politician) =

Bangladeshi photographer

Nawab Ibrahim Khalil
- ইব্রাহীম খলিল

Member of the Bangladesh Parliament for Faridpur-17
- In office 18 February 1979 – 12 February 1981
- Preceded by: M. A. Kasem

Personal details
- Born: 1947 Sakhipur, Faridpur District
- Died: 7 July 1981 (aged 33–34) London, United Kingdom
- Party: Bangladesh Muslim League
- Education: University of Dhaka

Ibrahim Khalil (Bengali: ইব্রাহীম খলিল; 1947 – 7 July 1981), also known as Nawab Bala, was a Bangladeshi politician who was a member of parliament. Khalil was a founding member of the Bangladesh Muslim League, serving as the party's president from 1969 to 1971.

== Early life and education ==
Khalil was born in 1947, to the Bengali Muslim Bala family of Sakhipur in Faridpur District. He undertook his education at the University of Dhaka where he also served as the first general secretary of the Haji Muhammad Mohsin Hall student council. He played an important role in the Eleven Points Programme against the President of Pakistan Ayub Khan. Khalil married Begum Shamsunnahar. He also served as founding president of the Bangladesh Youth Muslim League.

== Career ==
Khalil became the whip of the Bangladesh Muslim League. He stood in the 1979 Bangladeshi general elections as a Bangladesh Muslim League candidate for the Faridpur-17 constituency.

== Death ==
Khalil died at 7pm on 7 July 1981 in London, United Kingdom due to illness. In his honour, the Ibrahim Khalil Memorial Council was established.
