= Abidur Reza Khan =

Bangladeshi politician

- আবিদুর রেজা খান

Member of Parliament from Undivided Faridpur-18 (present Shariatpur-3)
- In office 1973–1975
- In office 1981–1982

Personal details
- Born: 22 September 1927 Bhedarganj Upazila, Shariatpur District
- Died: 3 September 2005 (aged 77) Samorita Hospital, Dhaka, Bangladesh
- Party: Bangladesh Awami League
- Other political affiliations: Bangladesh Nationalist Party
- Education: University of Dhaka, Government Rajendra College

Abidur Reza Khan (22 September 1927 – 3 September 2005) was a Bangladesh Awami League politician.

== Birth and early life ==
Abidur Reza Khan was born on 22 September 1927 in Bhedarganj Upazila of Shariatpur District.

== Career ==
Abidur Reza Khan was elected to parliament from undivided Faridpur-18 (present Shariatpur-3) as a Bangladesh Awami League candidate in 1973.

== Death ==
Abidur Reza Khan died on 3 September 2005 Samorita Hospital, Dhaka, Bangladesh. Prime Minister Sheikh Hasina visited Elephant Road and paid her tribute to late Awami League leader Abidur Reza Khan.
