= Dasherjangal =

Dasherjangal দাসেরজংগল
- Village
- Location in Bangladesh
- Coordinates: 23.076528°N 90.431868°E
- Country: Bangladesh
- Division: Dhaka Division
- District: Shariatpur District
- Time zone: UTC+6 (BST)
- Postal code: 8050
- Website: bangladesh.gov.bd/maps/images/Dhaka/Gosairhat.gif

Dasherjangal (Bengali: দাসেরজংগল) is a mouza as well as village of Idilpur Union of Gosairhat Upazila under Shariatpur District in the Dhaka Division, located at southern-central Bangladesh beside the west bank of Jayanti river.

== Location and history ==
Dasherjangal is located at 23.0765277°N 90.4318679°E. It is bounded on the north by Dhipur Mouza, on the south by Khordajangal and Ikrakandi mouza, on the east by Joyanti river and Mohishkandi mouza, on the west by Moheswar patty mouza.

About the origin of the name Dasherjangal nothing is definitely known. It is said that, this name came from "Das-er-jungle" or "Jungle of Das", that means jungle of God's servant. During the British Raj in 1854 Dasherjangal was a Mouza of Idilpur Pargana of Madaripur subdivision under Bakerganj District and later in 1873 it came under Faridpur District where Dasherjangal was seen as 63rd mouza of Faridpur District in C.S. survey of 1888–1905. After independence of Bangladesh Shariatpur District was created in 1984 and Dasherjangal came under it.

== Demography ==
Dasherjangal is the most populated mouza of Gosairhat Upazila (3,213 inhabitants per square kilometer), where the national density is 1099 per km^{2}. Present population of Dasherjangal are 6314 with 3210 male and 3104 female, sex ratio (M/F) 104, urban area 1.47 km^{2}, house hold 922, population 4723 (male 2489, female 2234) and literacy rate (7+yrs) 54.20%.

== Economy ==
Dasharjangal Bazaar is renowned for its Dasherjangal hat (marketplace) which sits Friday and Monday, where people form all over the district and Barisal District come for marketing. Vegetables and river fishes including Hilsa (Tenualosa ilisha) are available in morning bazaar.

Dasherjangal is also famous for its Dasherjangal Goo Hat (marketplaces for cattle), which sits bazaar adjacent field in every Friday. Cattle dealers drove large boats from all over Shariatpur District and Barisal District to sell their livestock here.

Agriculture is the main sources of economy of Dasherjangal. Main crops are rice, paddy, chilly, jute, paan and khujerer gur (date tree molasses). Paan is mostly exported to capital city Dhaka and abroad also. Other sources are livestock, fishing, business, communication and non-agricultural labor.

== Administration ==
Dasherjangal is under Idilpur Union Parishad local government body and it is administered by Gosairhat Upazila Nirbahi Officer (UNO) for central government. Gosairhat Upazila Sub-Post Office, Gosairhat police station, Marriage registry office, Rupali bank, Sonali bank and Bangladesh Krishi Bank are situated in Dasherjangal area.

== Education and culture ==
Idilpur Girls' High School and Dasherjangal Government Primary School are main schools of this village, also have other educational institutions. Male students go to nearby Idilpur Pilot High School and intermediate students to adjacent Shamsur Rahman College. There is a Sirajuddin Kawmi Madrasah in this village. A large number of Muslim families send their children to attend part-time Islamic religious courses to Masjids and Maktabs or even to pursue full-time Madrasah education. Dasherjangal Bazaar Jamye Masjid is the largest mosque of Dasherjangal where Jumu'ah and daily 5 times namaj are held in congregation. There are mandirs for prayer for Hindu religion people. People from all religion live here with communal harmony.

== See also ==
- List of villages in Bangladesh
