= Shawkat Ali (politician) =

Bangladeshi politician (1937–2020)

- শওকত আলী
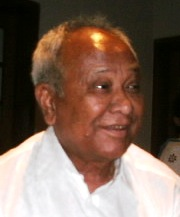
- Ali in 2012

11th Speaker of Jatiya Sangsad (acting)
- In office 24 April 2013 – 30 April 2013
- Preceded by: Mohammad Abdul Hamid
- Succeeded by: Shirin Sharmin Chaudhury

11th Deputy Speaker of Jatiya Sangsad
- In office 25 January 2009 – 24 January 2014
- Speaker: Mohammad Abdul Hamid; Himself (acting); Shirin Sharmin Chaudhury
- Preceded by: Akhtar Hameed Siddiqui
- Succeeded by: Fazle Rabbi Miah

Member of Parliament
- In office 29 January 2014 – 28 January 2018
- Preceded by: Himself
- Succeeded by: AKM Enamul Haque Shamim
- Constituency: Shariatpur-2
- In office 25 January 2009 – 24 January 2014
- Preceded by: Himself
- Succeeded by: Himself
- Constituency: Shariatpur-2
- In office 28 October 2001 – 27 October 2006
- Preceded by: Himself
- Succeeded by: Himself
- Constituency: Shariatpur-2
- In office 14 July 1996 – 13 July 2001
- Preceded by: Khandaker Abdul Jalil
- Succeeded by: Himself
- Constituency: Shariatpur-2
- In office 5 April 1991 – 24 November 1995
- Preceded by: T. M. Giasuddin Ahmed
- Succeeded by: Khandaker Abdul Jalil
- Constituency: Shariatpur-2
- In office 18 February 1979 – 24 March 1982
- Preceded by: Aminul Islam Danesh Mia
- Succeeded by: Position Abolished
- Constituency: Faridpur-15

Personal details
- Born: 27 January 1937 Naria, Bengal, British India
- Died: 16 November 2020 (aged 83) Dhaka, Bangladesh
- Party: Bangladesh Awami League
- Education: University of Dhaka
- Profession: Army officer, Politician

Military service
- Allegiance: Pakistan (Before 1969); Bangladesh
- Branch/service: Pakistan Army; Bangladesh Army
- Years of service: 1959–1975
- Rank: Colonel
- Unit: Ordnance Corps
- Commands: Company Commander of S Force; Commandant of CMTD, Dhaka; Director of Ordnance Service
- Battles/wars: Bangladesh Liberation War

Col. Shawkat Ali (27 January 1937 – 16 November 2020) was a Bangladeshi politician who served as a deputy speaker of the Jatiya Sangsad. He was a member of the Awami League. He was one of the accused in the historic Agartala Conspiracy Case and a freedom fighter in the Liberation War of Bangladesh.

== Early life ==
Ali was born in Shariatpur, British India (now in Bangladesh), to Munshi Mobarak and Maleka Begum. He was the eldest son among nine children. He passed his matriculation from Khepupara High School in 1953. He completed his Intermediate of Commerce from Jaganath College in 1956. While studying at Jaganath College, he joined the Police Directorate as a lower division assistant due to a financial crisis. Later he joined the Secretariat at the same rank. In 1958 he completed his Bachelor of Commerce degree from Dhaka University. In the same year, he joined the Pakistan Army. Shawkat completed his LL.B. from Comilla Law College under the University of Dhaka in 1958.

He joined the Officers Training School as a cadet of the 7th Officers Training School Course in 1958. He was commissioned in the Ordnance Corps of the Pakistan Army on 24 January 1959. He was first posted to Ordnance Depot Quetta. In 1962 he was posted to Central Ordnance Depot Rawalpindi. Later he served as the commanding officer of the 94th Independent Ammunition Depot in Comilla Cantonment. In February 1967, he was posted to Ordnance School as an Instructor.

=== Agartala Conspiracy Case ===
Ali was a captain in 1968 when he was Accused No. 26 of the 35 implicated in the Agartala Conspiracy Case as a conspirator to secede East Pakistan from Pakistan. Initially, he was supposed to be tried before a court-martial, but the government of Pakistan felt they would benefit more from a civil trial. The charges were dropped the next year amidst public protest; Ali was still forced to retire in 1969.

Although it was largely thought that the case was only meant to frame Sheikh Mujibur Rahman and others, in 2010, and on the anniversary of the withdrawal of the case on 22 February 2011, Ali confessed to the Parliament at a point of order that the charges read out to them were accurate, stating that they formed a Shangram Parishad (action committee) under Rahman for the sedition and secession of East Pakistan.

== Time in the Bangladesh Army ==
After Bangladesh declared independence from Pakistan and the war broke out, Ali was reinstated into the army after the formation of the Bangladesh Forces in 1971 to fight the Bangladesh Liberation War. He was forced to retire the second time when he was a colonel in 1975 working as the director of ordnance services following the assassination of Sheikh Mujibur Rahman, since he was close to Mujib.

== Political career ==
Ali was elected to parliament in the 1979, 1991, 1996, 2001, and 2008 general elections. During his time in office, he has served on various parliamentary committees, including the Standing Committee on Ministry of Shipping and the Committee on Private Members Bills and Resolutions as their chairman between 1996 and 2001. He was also a lawyer registered under the Supreme Court.

Ali was selected as the deputy speaker of the ninth parliament on 25 January 2009, following a landslide Awami League victory. When Speaker Abdul Hamid was acting president and later elected president, Ali was acting speaker of the National Parliament.

During his time as the deputy speaker, Ali chaired many sessions of the parliament when speaker Abdul Hamid was absent.

== Personal life ==
Ali authored two books, one in English and the other in Bangla, both about the Agartala Conspiracy Case. He was married and had two sons, Firoze Shawkat Ali and Khaled Shawkat Ali, and a daughter, Marina Shawkat Ali.

== Death ==
Ali died on 16 November 2020 at the age of 83.
