= Shariatpur Government College =

- শরীয়তপুর সরকারি কলেজ
- Type: Public
- Established: 1978
- Affiliations: National University of Bangladesh
- Principal: FAZLUL HAQUE
- Students: 6000+
- Location: Shariatpur, Bangladesh; 23.2031°N 90.3373°E
- Campus: Urban
- Language: Bengali, English
- Colours: Black, white
- Website: sgc.gov.bd

Shariatpur Government College (Bengali: শরীয়তপুর সরকারি কলেজ) is a degree college in the Dhanuka area of the town of Shariatpur, headquarters of Shariatpur District, Bangladesh. Founded in 1978, it is a government college. This college started at the intermediate level. It later developed to the degree, honours and masters level and provides some honours level courses.

== History ==
On 9 June 1978, this college was established by the then sub-divisional commissioner Md. Aminur Rahman and 1 March 1980, the college was nationalized. In the academic year 1998–1999, the doors of higher education in Shariatpur district were opened with the introduction of honors courses in political science and management at Shariatpur Government College. Shariatpur College students from remote areas, since its inception has played a leading role in higher education.

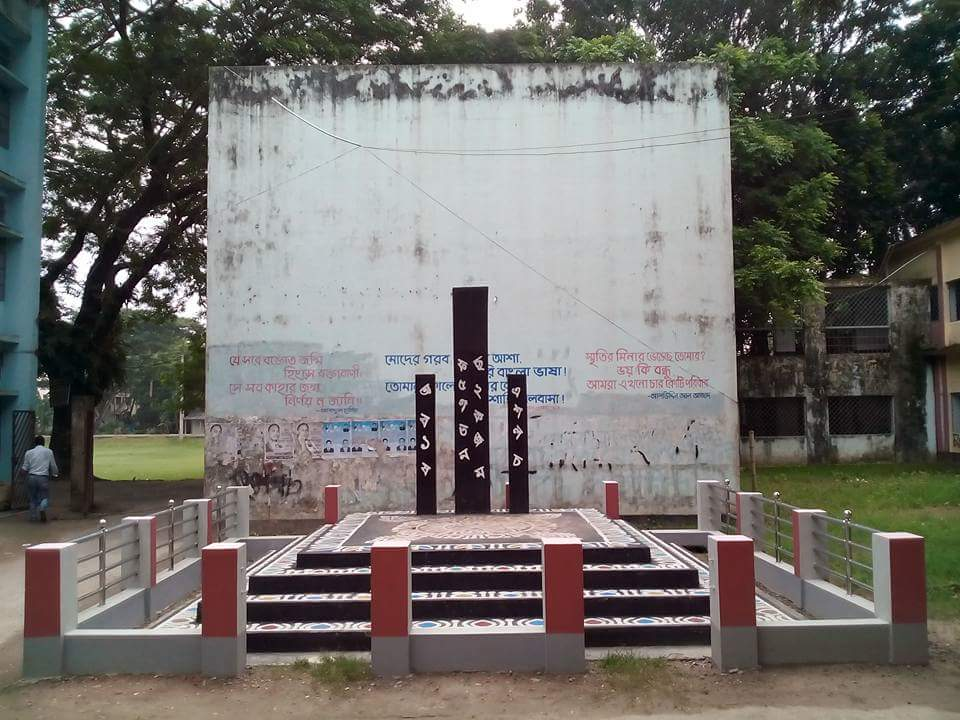
College Shahid Minar

== Departments ==
=== Hon's ===
The college has the following nine departments:

- Department of Marketing (hon's)
- Department of Accounting (hon's)
- Department of Bengali (hon's)
- Department of History (hon's)
- Department of Islamic History (hon's)
- Department of Economics (hon's)
- Department of Philosophy (hon's)
- Department of Management (hon's)
- Department of Mathematics (hon's)
- Department of Physics (hon's)
- Department of Political Science (hon's)

=== Hon's Pass ===
- Degree (pass) B.A (Degree)
- Degree (pass) B.S.S (Degree)
- Degree (pass) B.B.S (Degree)
- Degree (pass) B.Sc (Degree)
- Degree (Private)

=== Mas'ts ===
- Department of Political Science (mas'ts)
- Department of Bangla (mas'ts)
- Department of Islamic History (mas'ts)
- Department of Management (mas'ts)
