= Golam Ali Chowdhury =

Bengali Muslim zamindar and philanthropist

- গোলাম আলী চৌধুরী
- Born: 1827; Faridpur district, Bengal Presidency
- Died: 7 January 1888 (aged 60–61); Faridpur district, Bengal Presidency
- Occupations: Landlord, philanthropist
- Children: 13

Mia Golam Ali Chowdhury Sahib (Bengali: মিঞা গোলাম আলী চৌধুরী সাহেব; 1824 – 7 January 1888), also known as Chowdhuri Golam Ali (Bengali: চৌধুরী গোলাম আলী), was a 19th-century Bengali Muslim zamindar and philanthropist from Faridpur in eastern Bengal.

== Life ==
Chowdhury was born in 1824 to a Bengali zamindar family of Muslim Mridha-Chowdhuries in Haturia, then part of the Faridpur district of the Bengal Presidency. He was the feudal landlord of Haturia, now under the Shariatpur District of Bangladesh. He inherited from his father, Muhammad Ashuq Mridha of Idilpur, who was a shaykh influenced by the teachings of the Hanafite imam Abu Yusuf.

Chowdhury's zamindari was spread across the districts of Faridpur and Bakerganj. He was well known for his wealth and was a great patron of education and public welfare, and used to donate generously for this purpose. Chowdhury aided the government in constructing a public bridge and ghat in Madaripur and other roads in the district. He also entirely funded the building for Madaripur's first pharmacy, and largely contributed to the construction of Barisal Government Entrance School. Chowdhury donated ten thousand rupees to the Dacca College Extension Fund.

The Kheya Ghater Majhi poem mentions the might of Chowdhury Golam Ali. He also constructed a mosque in his village, Ghatakhan-Haturia, which has now been demolished and rebuilt.

== Death and descendants ==
Chowdhury died on 7 January 1888. He was buried in his village in Ghatakhan (Haturia), and his brick grave is still preserved. The western wall of the grave has a Bengali inscription consisting of eight lines.

He had three wives, with whom he had three sons and eight daughters. His first wife, Aizunnesa Khatun, was the mother of Ali Ahmad Chowdhury and two daughters. After the death of his younger brother, Chowdhury married his widowed sister-in-law Izzatunnesa Khatun, who was his first wife's half-sister. Together they had two sons, Amjad Ali Chowdhury and Tajammul Ali Chowdhury, and six daughters with the eldest being Karimunnesa. Chowdhury had two daughters with his third wife, Jawaidunnesa, and he died before the birth of the younger daughter, Majidunnesa.
