= Palong Tulasar Gurudas Government High School =

- পালং তুলাসার গুরুদাস সরকারি উচ্চ বিদ্যালয়
- Shariatpur, Dhaka; Bangladesh

Information
- Type: Government secondary school
- Established: 1899
- School district: Shariatpur
- Headmaster: Khalilur Rahman ( In Charge )
- Staff: 5
- Teaching staff: 43
- Gender: Male
- Enrollment: 1110
- Classes: 6 - 10
- Language: Bangla
- Campus: Tulasar
- Slogan: Education is the backbone of the nation ( Bangali : শিক্ষাই জাতির মেরুদণ্ড )
- Sports: Cricket, football, athletics
- Nickname: Boys' School of Shariatpur
- Publication: Annual School Magazine
- Website: http://ptgghs.edu.bd

Palong Tulasar Gurudas Government High School (Bengali: পালং তুলাসার গুরুদাস সরকারি উচ্চ বিদ্যালয়) is a secondary school in Shariatpur District, Bangladesh. Founded in 1899, it is located at Tulaser in the Shariatpur Sadar Upazila area. It is one of the most well-known high school in Shariatpur district.

== Clubs ==
These include:

- English Club
- Science Club
- Computer Club
- Debating Club
- Cultural Club
- Writers Club etc.
