= Palong (disambiguation) =

Palong may also refer to:

- Palong (state constituency), a state constituency in Malaysia
- Palong Tulasar Gurudas Government High School, a high school in Bangladesh
- Palong Tin Museum, a museum in Malaysia
