= Zajira Upazila =

Zajira জাজিরা
- Upazila
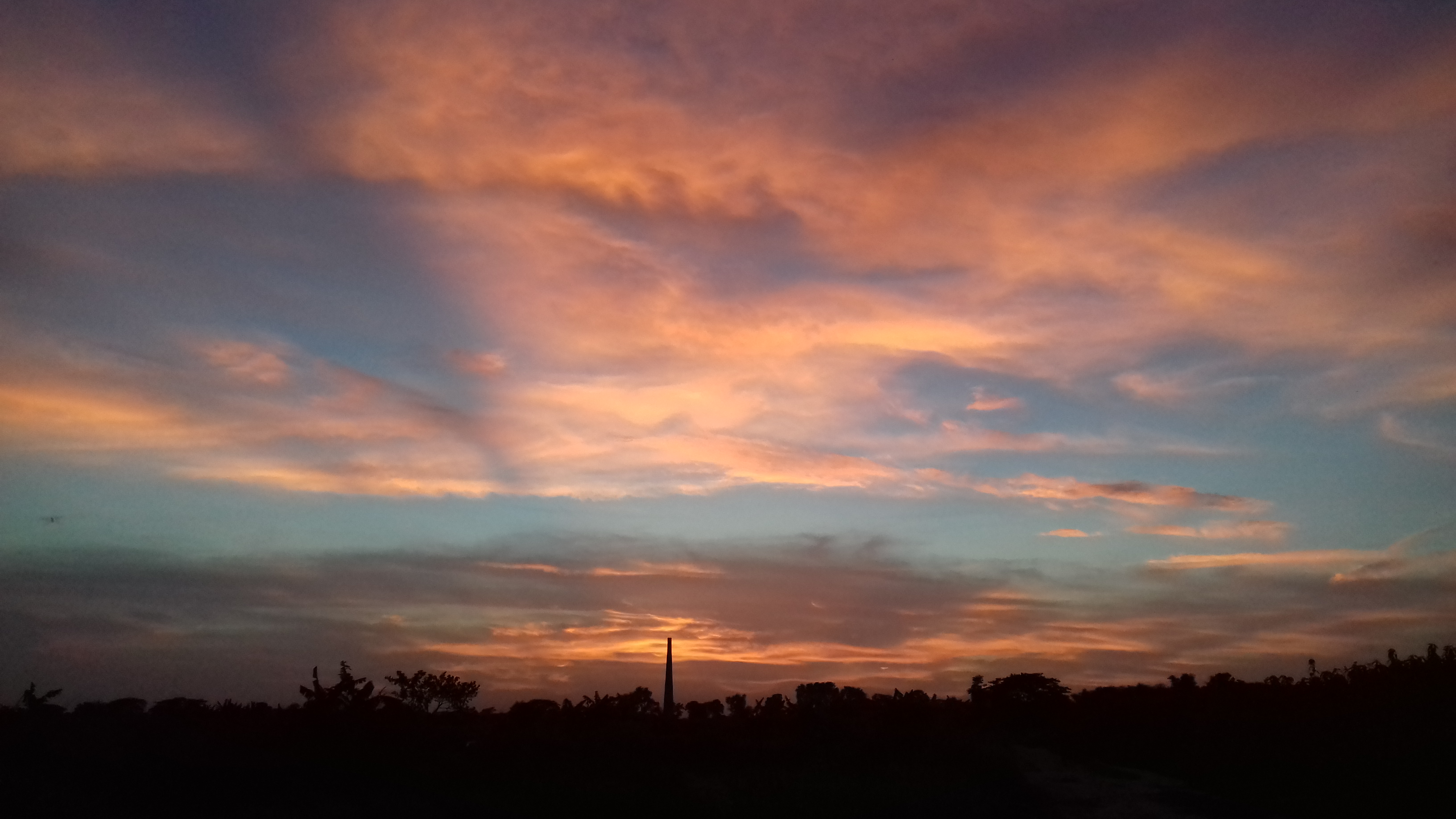
- Sunset in the village of Laukhola, Zajira upazila, Shariatpur district

- Coordinates: 23°21′N 90°20′E
- Country: Bangladesh
- Division: Dhaka
- District: Shariatpur

Government
  - Upazila Nirbahi Officer (UNO): Md. Tahmidul Islam

Area
  - Total: 246.21 km^{2} (95.06 sq mi)

Population (2022)
  - Total: 217,771
  - Density: 884.49/km^{2} (2,290.8/sq mi)
- Time zone: UTC+6 (BST)
- Postal code: 8010
- Website: zajira.shariatpur.gov.bd(in Bengali)

Zajira (Bengali: জাজিরা) is an upazila of Shariatpur District in the Division of Dhaka, Bangladesh. Zajira Thana was established in 1973 and was upgraded to an upazila in 1984. It was named after its administrative center, the town of Zajira.

== Geography ==
Zajira Upazila has a total area of 246.21 square kilometres (95.06 sq mi). About two-thirds is land and one-third is water, chiefly the Padma River, which flows through the northern part of the upazila. It borders Munshiganj District to the north, Naria Upazila to the east and south, Shariatpur Sadar Upazila to the south, and Madaripur District to the west.

== Demographics ==
Historical population
Year	Pop. (000)	±%
1981	161	—
1991	157	−2.5%
2001	179	+14.0%
2011	194	+8.4%
2022	218	+12.4%
Source: Bangladesh Bureau of Statistics

Religions in Zajira Upazila (2022)
Religion	Percent
Islam	99.98%
Other or not stated	0.02%

According to the 2022 Bangladeshi census, Zajira Upazila had 50,329 households and a population of 217,771. 10.66% of the population were under 5 years of age. Zajira had a literacy rate (age 7 and over) of 71.03%: 72.95% for males and 69.16% for females, and a sex ratio of 98.14 males for every 100 females. 56,766 (26.07%) lived in urban areas.

According to the 2011 Census of Bangladesh, Zajira Upazila had 41,715 households and a population of 194,019. 49,610 (25.57%) were under 10 years of age. Zajira had a literacy rate (age 7 and over) of 44.4%, compared to the national average of 51.8%, and a sex ratio of 1020 females per 1000 males. 21,251 (10.95%) lived in urban areas.

== Administration ==
Zanjira Thana was formed in 1973 and it was turned into an upazila in 1984.

Current head of administration is Upazila Nirbahi Officer (UNO) Md. Tahmidul Islam. He is serving from 3rd December, 2025 onwards.

Zajira Upazila is divided into Zajira Municipality and 12 union parishads: Bara Gopalpur, Bara Krishnagar, Barakandi, Bilaspur, Zajira, Joynagor, Kunder Char, Mulna, Naodoba, Paler Char, Purba Naodoba, and Sener Char. The union parishads are subdivided into 126 mauzas and 200 villages.

Zajira Municipality is subdivided into 9 wards and 19 mahallas.

== Education ==
There are three colleges in the upazila. They include Jajira College, Dr. Moslem Uddin Khan Degree College and Government B.K. Nagar Bangabandhu College. Jajira College located in Jajira Upazila Sadar.

The madrasa education system here includes one fazil madrasa.

== See also ==
- Upazilas of Bangladesh
- Districts of Bangladesh
- Divisions of Bangladesh
