= Shariatpur Sadar Upazila =

Shariatpur Sadar শরিয়তপুর সদর
- Upazila
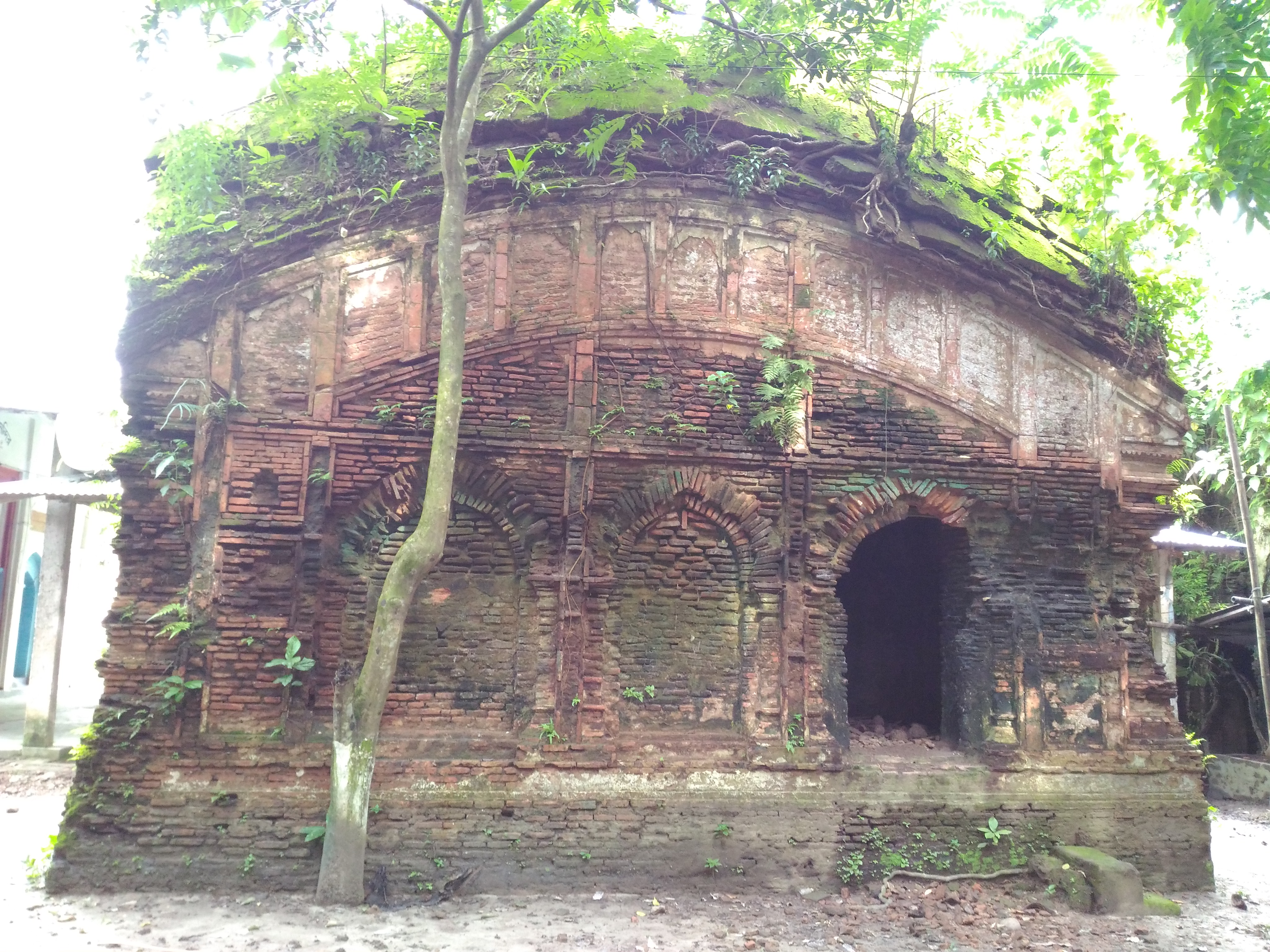
- Manasa Temple, Shariatpur

- Coordinates: 23°13′N 90°21′E
- Country: Bangladesh
- Division: Dhaka
- District: Shariatpur
- Headquarters: Shariatpur

Area
  - Total: 175.09 km^{2} (67.60 sq mi)

Population (2022)
  - Total: 239,590
  - Density: 1,368.4/km^{2} (3,544.1/sq mi)
- Time zone: UTC+6 (BST)
- Postal code: 8000
- Area code: 0601
- Website: sadar.shariatpur.gov.bd(in Bengali)

Shariatpur Sadar Upazila mauza geocode map

Shariatpur Sadar (Bengali: শরিয়তপুর সদর) is an upazila of Shariatpur District in the Division of Dhaka, Bangladesh. Shariatpur Thana was converted into an upazila in 1984. It is the subdistrict where the district headquarters, Shariatpur town, is located.

A huge number of Bangladeshi populations in Italy comes from the Shariatpur district.

== Etymology ==
Shariatpur was named after Haji Shariatullah (1781–1840), who was the founder of Faraizi Movement and an eminent Islamic reformer/revivalist during British Raj. The Bengali word sadar means headquarter.

== Geography ==
Shariatpur Sadar Upazila has a total area of 175.09 square kilometres (67.60 sq mi). It borders Zajira Upazila to the north, Naria and Bhedarganj upazilas to the east, Damudya Upazila to the southeast, and Madaripur District to the south and west.

== Demographics ==
Historical population
Year	Pop. (000)	±%
1981	145	—
1991	161	+11.0%
2001	199	+23.6%
2011	210	+5.5%
2022	240	+14.3%
Source: Bangladesh Bureau of Statistics

Religions in Shariatpur Sadar Upazila (2022)
Religion	Percent
Islam	94.73%
Hinduism	5.25%
Other or not stated	0.02%

According to the 2022 Bangladeshi census, Shariatpur Sadar Upazila had 58,237 households and a population of 239,590. 10.11% of the population were under 5 years of age. Shariatpur Sadar had a literacy rate (age 7 and over) of 74.11%: 75.62% for males and 72.73% for females, and a sex ratio of 93.40 males for every 100 females. 81,227 (33.90%) lived in urban areas.

According to the 2011 Census of Bangladesh, Shariatpur Sadar Upazila had 45,883 households and a population of 210,259. 49,738 (23.67%) were under 10 years of age. Shariatpur Sadar had a literacy rate (age 7 and over) of 50.8%, compared to the national average of 51.8%, and a sex ratio of 1019 females per 1000 males. 49,535 (23.76%) lived in urban areas.

== Administration ==
Shariatpur (former name Palong) Thana was turned into an upazila in 1984.

The upazila is divided into Shariatpur Municipality and 11 union parishads: Angaria, Binodpur, Chandrapur, Chikandi, Chitalia, Domsar, Mahmudpur, Palong, Rudrakar, Shaul Para, and Tulasar. The union parishads are subdivided into 105 mauzas and 152 villages.

Shariatpur Municipality was established in 1990. It is subdivided into 9 wards and 27 mahallas.

== Education ==
There are three colleges in the upazila. They include Shariatpur Government College.

According to Banglapedia, Palong Tulasar Gurudas Government High School is a notable secondary school in the upazila.

The Madrasa education system here includes one Fazil Madrasa.

There is a private university in this district named Z. H. Sikder University of Science and Technology http://www.zhsust.edu.bd/ in Bhedorgonj upazila. One newly established private medical college is also in this area named Monowara Sikder Medical College and Hospital http://sikderhospital.com/

== See also ==
- Upazilas of Bangladesh
- Districts of Bangladesh
- Divisions of Bangladesh
