= Khandaker Abdul Jalil =

Bangladeshi politician

Member of Bangladesh Parliament
- In office 15 February 1996 – 12 June 1996
- Preceded by: Shawkat Ali
- Succeeded by: Shawkat Ali

Personal details
- Political party: Bangladesh Nationalist Party

Khandaker Abdul Jalil (Bengali: খন্দকার আবদুল জলিল) is a Bangladesh Nationalist Party politician and a member of parliament from Shariatpur-2.

== Career ==
Jalil was elected to parliament from Shariatpur-2 as a Bangladesh Nationalist Party candidate on 15 February 1996.
