= The Calcutta Review =

Periodical published by the University of Calcutta

The Calcutta Review is a bi-annual periodical, now published by the Calcutta University Press, featuring scholarly articles from a variety of disciplines.

== History ==
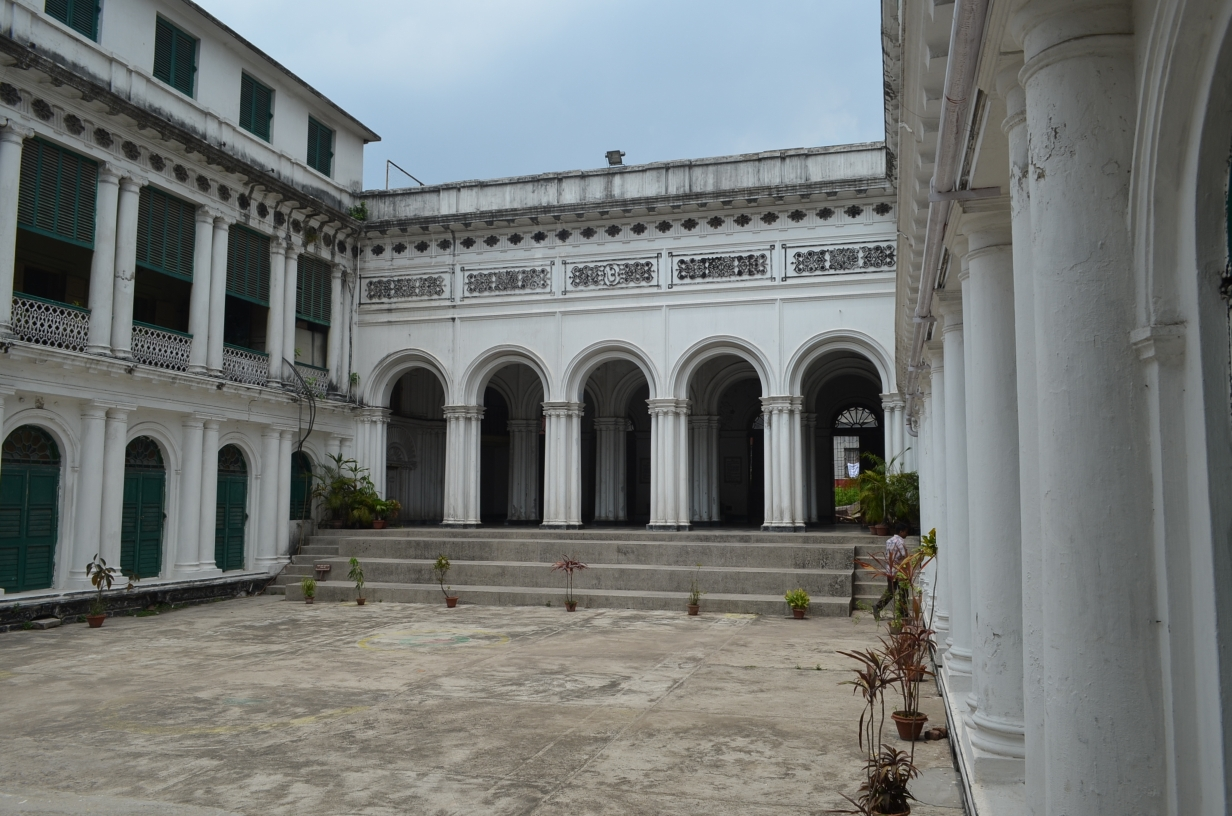
Tagore House, Calcutta

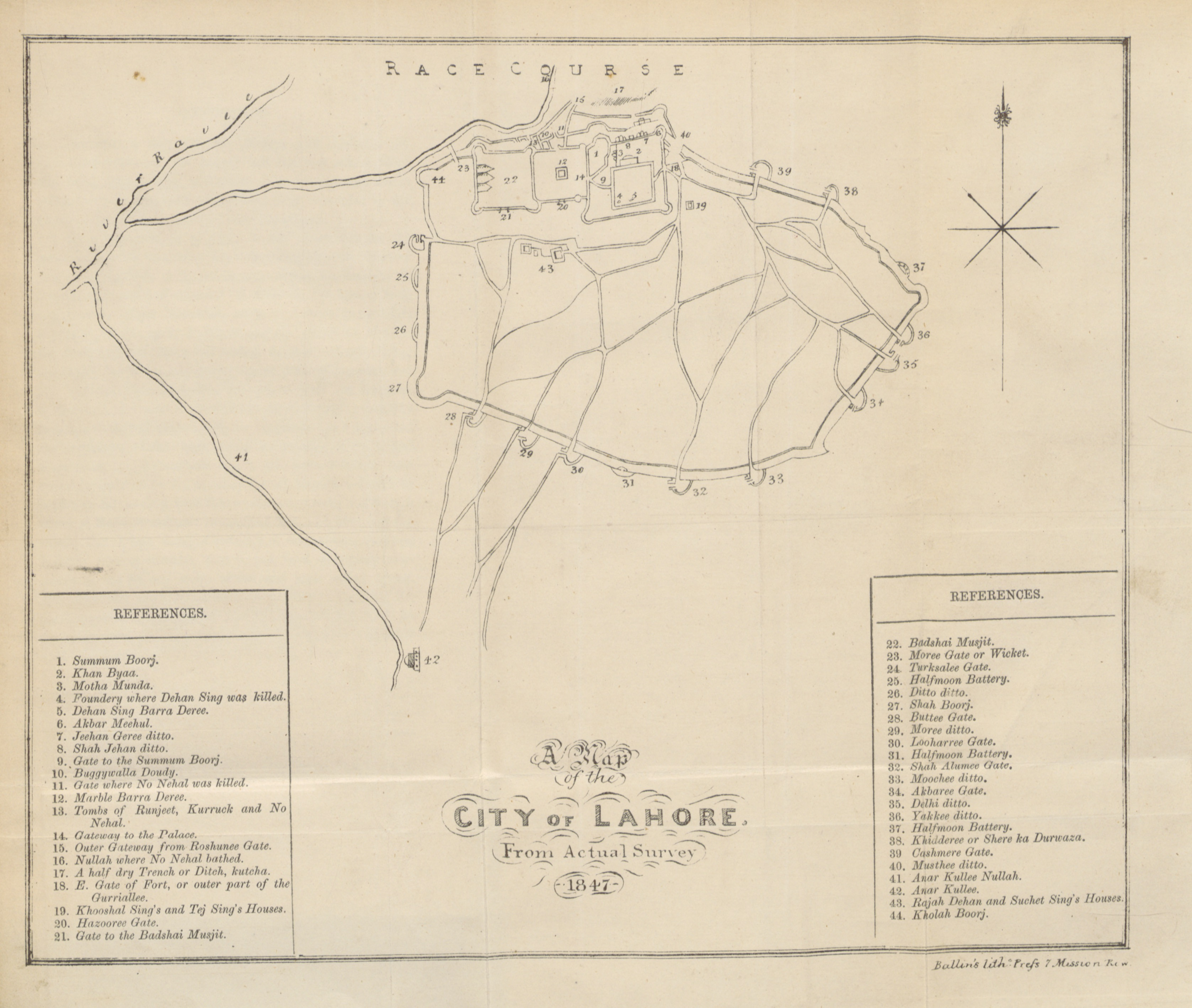
A map published in the Calcutta Review

The Calcutta Review was founded in May 1844, by Sir John William Kaye and Reverend Alexander Duff. Through the journal, Sir John Kaye aimed "to bring together such useful information, and propagate such sound opinions, relating to Indian affairs, as will, it is hoped, conduce, in some small measure, directly or indirectly, to the amelioration of the condition of the people".

The periodical proved to be successful, and was published as a quarterly up until 1912. Sir John Kaye was Editor of four issues, and then retired due to ill health. He remained the owner of the review until 1855, when it was purchased by Meredith Townsend. Thacker, Spink and Company bought it in 1857. It was printed by Sanders and Cowes until 1857, when it moved to the Serampore Press. When Rev. T. Ridsdale took over as editor, it was published by R. C. Lepage and Company.

The journal was not published in 1912. In its second series, from 1913 to 1920, it was published bi-annually. In 1921, it was acquired by the Calcutta University Press, which now releases it bi-annually.

== Early editors ==
- Sir John William Kaye (1844–1845)
- Reverend Dr. Alexander Duff (1845–1849)
- Reverend W. S. Mackay (1849–1852)
- Reverend Thomas Smith (1852–1855, 1857)
- George Smith (1855–1856, 1857–1864)
- Meredith Townsend (1856–1857)
- Sir Alfred Swaine Lethbridge (1871–1878)
- James W. Furrell (1879–1884, 1894–1902)
- Sir Richard Temple
- Reverend T. Ridsdale

== See also ==
- Dacca Review
