= Nahim Razzaq =

Bangladeshi politician

- নাহিম রাজ্জাক
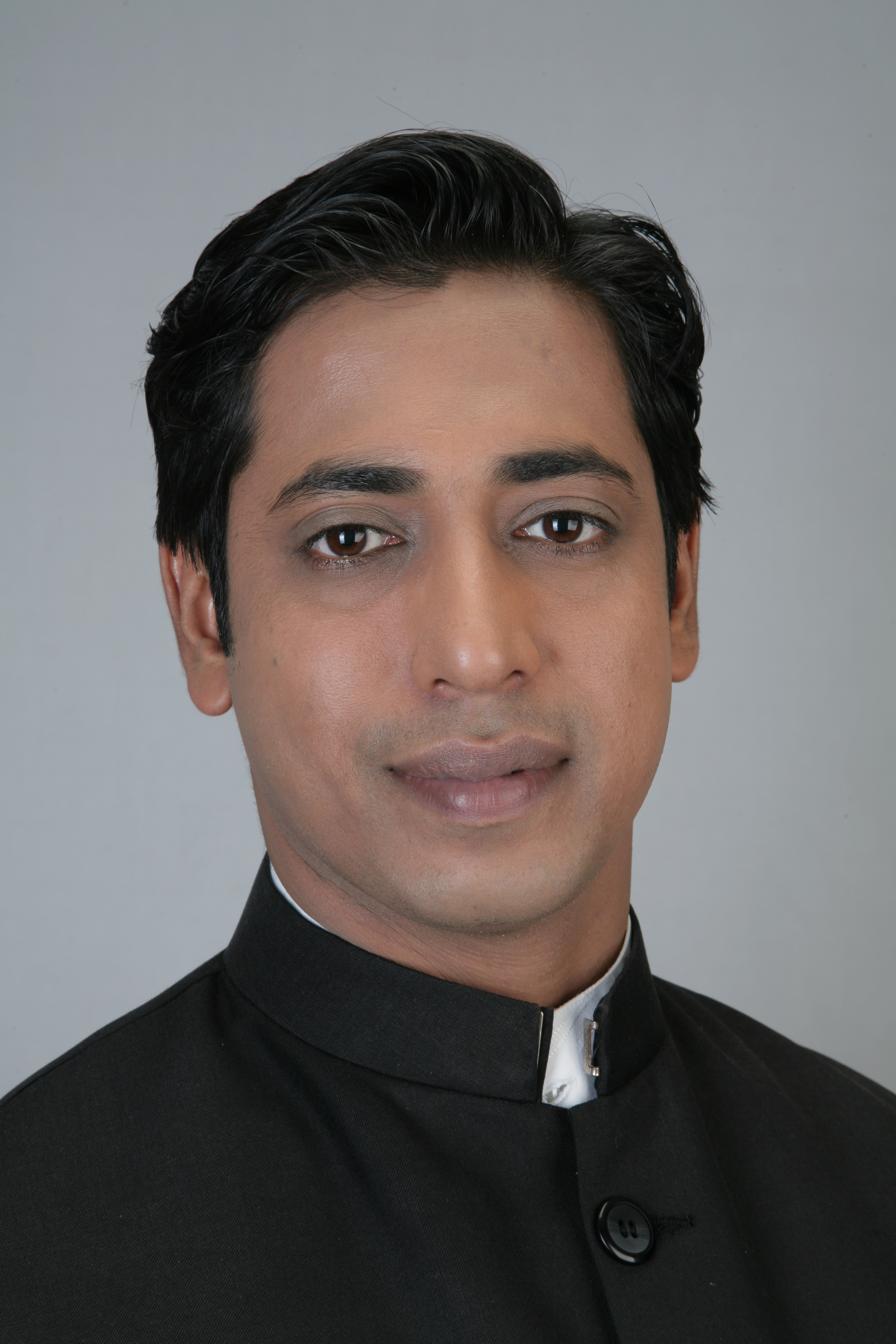
- Official portrait

Member of Parliament for Shariatpur-3
- In office February 2012 – 6 August 2024
- Preceded by: Abdur Razzaq

Personal details
- Born: 7 February 1981 (age 45)
- Party: Bangladesh Awami League
- Parent: Abdur Razzaq (father)
- Education: MBA
- Alma mater: Middlesex University
- Occupation: Politician
- Website: www.nahimrazzaq.com.bd

Nahim Razzaq (born 7 February 1981) is a Bangladesh Awami League politician. He is a former Jatiya Sangsad member representing the Shariatpur-3 constituency for 4 terms from 2012 to 2024. Razzaq is a former member of the Parliamentary Standing Committee on Ministry of Foreign Affairs. He received the Junior Chamber International- Top 10 Outstanding Youth Person (TOYP) award in 2015 in Bangladesh.

Razzaq served on the Parliamentary Standing Committee on the Ministry of Disaster Management and Relief and the Ministry of Youth and Sports. Nahim is also an adviser of E-CAB (E-Commerce Association of Bangladesh). Nahim is also engaged in addressing climate change issues as the convenor of Climate Parliament Bangladesh.

== Early life and education ==
Nahim was born and grew up in Dhaka. His father, Abdur Razzaq, was a veteran national leader from the Bangladesh Awami League and a leading organizer of the liberation war in 1971. Abdur Razzaq was elected as the party's general secretary two times and as a member of the national parliament six times. Abdur Razzaq was appointed as the Minister of the Ministry of Water Resources from 1996 to 2001 in Sheikh Hasina's first cabinet. Abdur Razzaq was a national leader, being one of the four sector commanders of the Bangladesh Liberation Force, or Mujib Bahini, during the 1971 liberation war of Bangladesh.

Nahim completed his undergraduate degree at Middlesex University.

== Political career ==
After the attempted assassination of the senior leadership of the Bangladesh Awami League on 21 August 2004 by the then regime and Islamic fundamentalist group JMB, where Nahim's father, along with the highest leadership of the then opposition party, was seriously injured, Nahim came back to Bangladesh and became active in politics. Nahim began his political career with the Bangladesh Awami League, being the organising secretary of the Damudya Poura Sabha unit in 2008. He became the member and advisor for the district committee of Shariatpur in 2012 and has been holding this position since then twice. Nahim was elected as a member of the Damudya Upazila Awami League unit in 2015.

After the demise of his father on 23 December 2011, he was nominated and won uncontested in the by-election, becoming the youngest member of the Bangladesh National Parliament in March 2012. Since then he has been elected another 2 times in the 2014 and 2018 national general election in the 10th and 11th sessions respectively.

== Activities and achievements ==
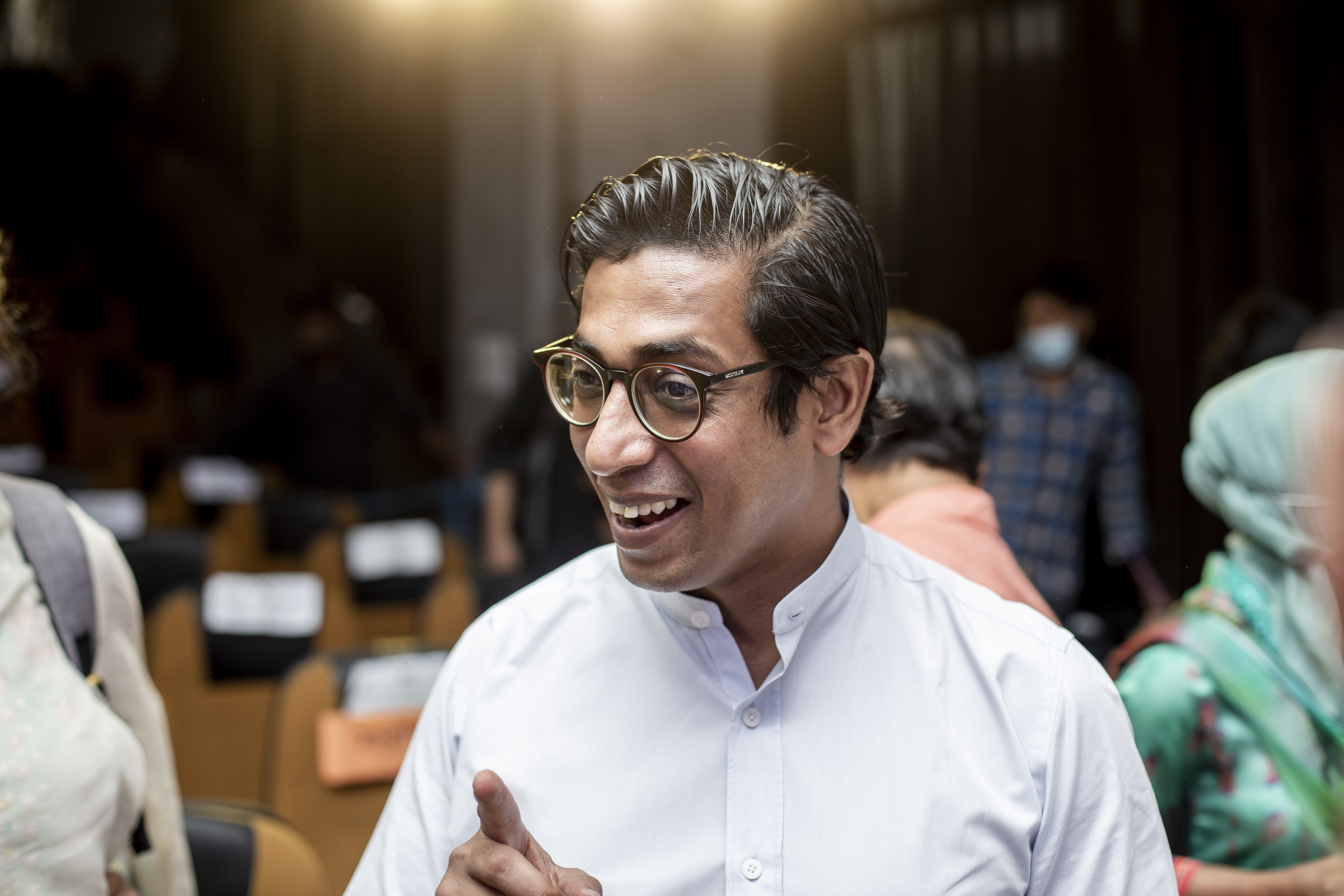
Nahim Razzaq is talking with guests at the inauguration ceremony of Y Magazine at KIB.

Nahim is the founding convener of the National Youth Platform called Young Bangla, which has steered the party's policy of youth engagement under the able leadership of the chairperson of CRI (Centre for Research and Information), Sajeeb Wazed, along with members of the trustee Saima Wazed, Radwan Mujib Siddiq, and Nasrul Hamid. He has played a vital role in forming the National Youth Policy during his tenure as an active member of the Parliamentary Standing Committee on the Ministry of Youth and Sport from 2014 to 2018. Nahim also holds responsibility as the co-chair of UNYSAB (United Nations Youth and Students Association of Bangladesh), which promotes volunteerism under the UN charter. Nahim is also the convener of the Bangabandhu Inter-University Sports Championship, in which students from over 65 universities participated in 2019. He is one of the organisers for one of the largest music festivals in Bangladesh since 2015 called Joy Bangla Concert.

He has also been handed the responsibility of leading policy advocacy on climate change as the convenor of the Climate Parliament Bangladesh caucus, which promoted renewable energy and sustainable development policies. He has been included in the advisory panel for e-Cab (E-Commerce Association of Bangladesh) for his role in forming the association and his active role in promoting e-commerce in Bangladesh.

Nahim leads now as a member of the Parliamentary Standing Committee on Ministry of Foreign Affairs since 2019. He is the co-chair of Dhaka Global Dialogue.

== Recognition ==
Razzaq have received the Junior Chamber International (JCI) – TOYP Top 10 Outstanding Youth Person Award in 2015 in Bangladesh.
