= T. M. Giasuddin Ahmed =

Bangladeshi politician (c.1937–2020)

Member of Parliament for Shariatpur-2
- In office 1986–1992

Personal details
- Born: c. 1937
- Died: 4 July 2020 Dhaka, Bangladesh
- Party: Bangladesh Nationalist Party; Jatiya Party

T. M. Giasuddin Ahmed (c. 1937 – 4 July 2020) was a politician of Shariatpur District of Bangladesh and a member of parliament for Shariatpur-2.

== Career ==
Ahmed was a former minister and president of Shariatpur district Bangladesh Nationalist Party. Before that he was elected to parliament from Shariatpur-2 as a Jatiya Party candidate in 1986 and 1988.

== Death ==
Giasuddin Ahmed died on 4 July 2020 from COVID-19, during the COVID-19 pandemic in Bangladesh.
