= M. A. Kasem =

Bangladeshi politician

Member of the Bangladesh Parliament for Faridpur-17
- In office 1973–1976
- Preceded by: AFM Nurul Haque Hawladar
- Succeeded by: Ibrahim Khalil

Personal details
- Political party: Awami League

M. A. Kasem (Bengali: এম. এ. কাসেম) is an Awami League politician in Bangladesh and the former member of parliament for Faridpur-17.

== Career ==
Kasem was elected to parliament from Faridpur-17 as an Awami League candidate in 1973. He was elected in a by-election after the incumbent member of parliament, AFM Nurul Haque Hawladar, was assassinated.

== Personal life ==
Kasem's has two sons, former vice-chancellor of Rajshahi Medical University, AZM Mostaque Hossain, and former press minister at the Bangladesh Embassy in Washington, D.C., AZM Sajjad Hossain.
