= Faridpur-17 =

Faridpur-17 was a parliamentary constituency in Bangladesh for the Jatiya Sangsad (National Parliament), located in Faridpur District.

== History ==
The Faridpur-17 constituency was created for the first general elections of independent Bangladesh in 1973. The seat was abolished in 1984.

== Elected Members of Parliament ==
| Election Year | Member | Party |
|---|---|---|
| 1973 | A. F. M. Nurul Haque Howladar | Bangladesh Awami League |
| 1973 (By-election) | M. A. Kashem | Bangladesh Awami League |
| 1979 | Ibrahim Khalil | Bangladesh Muslim League |
