= Safiqur Rahman Kiran =

Bangladeshi politician

== Md. Shafiqur Rahman(Kiron) ==
Md. Shafiqur Rahman (Kiron)

Member of Bangladesh Parliament
- Incumbent
- Assumed office 17 February 2026
- Preceded by: Abdur Razzaq
- Succeeded by: AKM Enamul Haque Shamim

Personal details
- Party: Bangladesh Nationalist Party
- Website: https://www.kironshariatpur.com/

Md. Shafiqur Rahman (Kiron) (Bengali: সফিকুর রহমান কিরণ) is a businessman, Bangladesh Nationalist Party (BNP) politician. He was the former member of parliament from Shariatpur-3 and a current member of Parliament from Shariatpur-2.

== Career ==
Kiron was elected to parliament from Shariatpur-3 as an independent candidate in the general election of 15 February 1996 and served in the member of the 6th Jatiya Sangsad. He is the current president of the Shariatpur District unit of the BNP, who is currently serving as the member of the 13th Jatiya Sangsad from Shariatpur-2 which took place in 12th February 2026. His rivalry with Jamal Sharif Hiru divided the district unit into two factions. He is a member of the central executive committee of the BNP.
