= M. A. Reza =

Bangladeshi politician

Member of Bangladesh Parliament
- In office 1988–1990

Personal details
- Born: 17 February 1947
- Died: 9 December 2001
- Party: Jatiya Party (Ershad)

M. A. Reza (Bengali: এম এ রেজা) was a Jatiya Party (Ershad) politician in Bangladesh and a former member of parliament for Shariatpur-3.

== Early life ==
Reza was born on 17 February 1947. He graduated from the University of Dhaka with a master's degree in political science.

== Career ==
Reza started his political career with Chattra League. He joined Jatiya Party in 1984. He was elected to parliament from Shariatpur-3 as a Jatiya Party candidate in 1988.

== Death ==
Reza died on 9 December 2001.
