= Dacca Review =

The Dacca Review was a monthly periodical, featuring scholarly articles from a variety of disciplines, edited by Bidhubhusan Goswami and Satyendranath Bhadra and published by Hari Ram Dhar in Dacca. It was published from April 1911 to at least May–June 1922.

== History ==
The Dacca Review was founded in June 1911, by Hari Ram Dhar in Dacca. Through the journal, it aimed "to bring together such useful information, and propagate such sound opinions, relating to British Indian and Dhaka affairs".

== See also ==
- The Calcutta Review
