= Shariatpur =

Shariatpur শরিয়তপুর
- Municipality
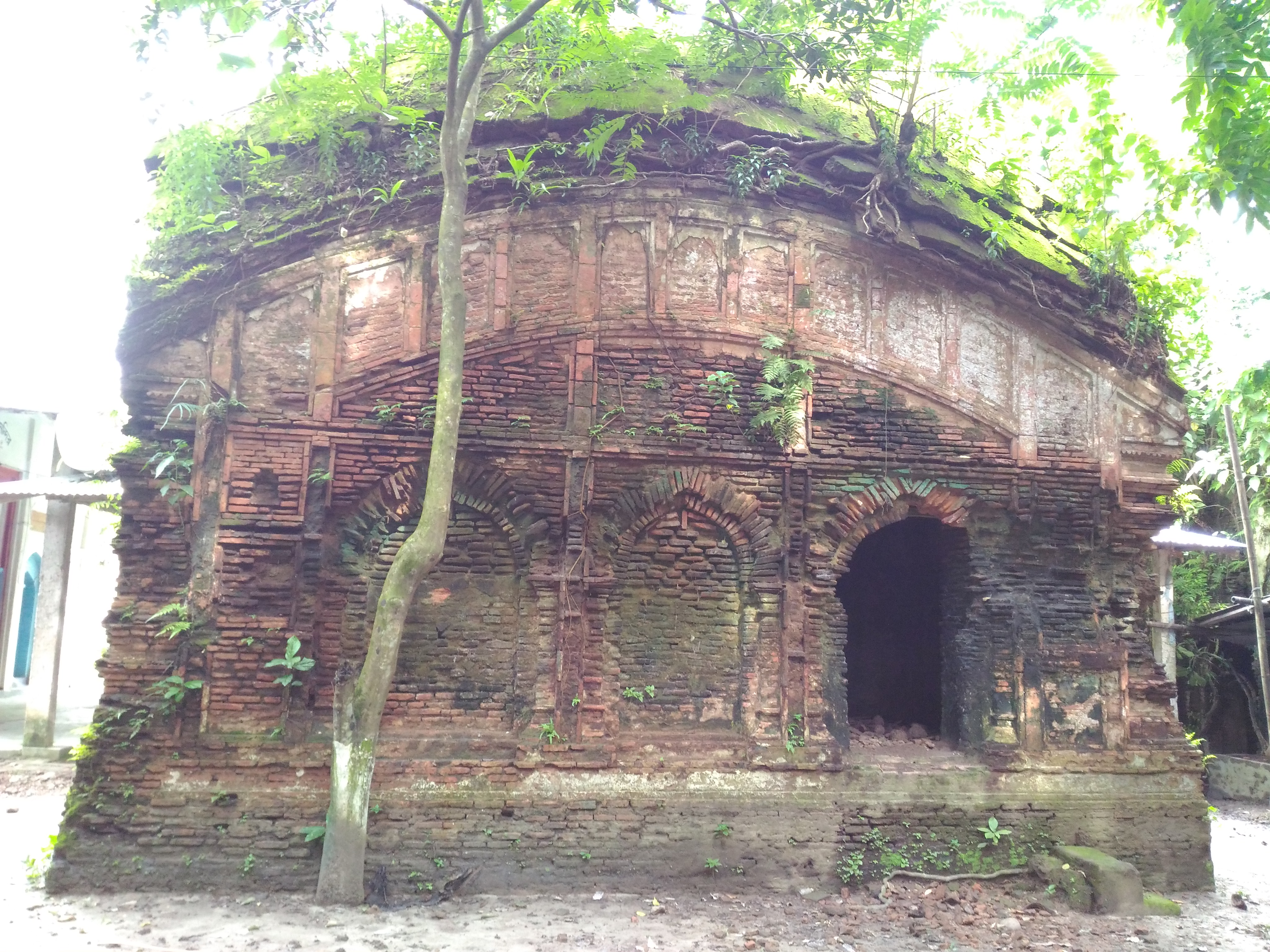
- Manasa Temple, Shariatpur

- Location within Dhaka division Location within Bangladesh
- Coordinates: 23°13′N 90°21′E
- Country: Bangladesh
- Division: Dhaka
- District: Shariatpur
- Upazila: Shariatpur Sadar

Area
  - Total: 24.92 km^{2} (9.62 sq mi)

Population (2011)
  - Total: 49,535
  - Density: 1,988/km^{2} (5,148/sq mi)
- Time zone: UTC+6 (BST)
- Postal code: 8000-8002

Shariatpur is a town in Dhaka division in south-central Bangladesh. It is the headquarters of Shariatpur District. It is named for Haji Shariatullah, an Islamic revivalist.

== Demographics ==
Religions in Shariatpur (2011)
Religion	Percent
Islam	90.51%
Hinduism	9.39%
Other or not stated	0.10%

According to the 2011 Bangladesh census, Shariatpur Paurashava had 10,908 households and a population of 49,535. 10,720 (21.64%) were under 10 years of age. Shariatpur had a literacy rate (age 7 and over) of 62.49%, compared to the national average of 51.8%, and a sex ratio of 972 females per 1000 males.
