= Gosairhat Upazila =

Gosairhat গোসাইরহাট
- Upazila
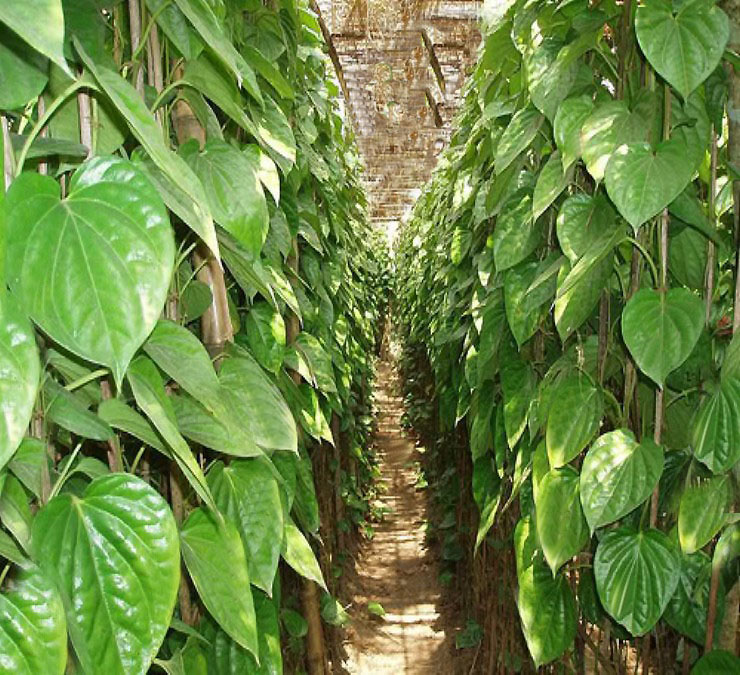
- Betel leaf Cultivation in Gosairhat

- Coordinates: 23°5′N 90°26′E
- Country: Bangladesh
- Division: Dhaka
- District: Shariatpur
- Establishment: 1921
- Granted Upazila status: 1983

Area
  - Total: 196.72 km^{2} (75.95 sq mi)

Population (2022)
  - Total: 175,016
  - Density: 889.67/km^{2} (2,304.2/sq mi)
- Time zone: UTC+6 (BST)
- Postal code: 8050
- Area code: 06024
- Website: gosairhat.shariatpur.gov.bd(in Bengali)

Gosairhat Upazila mauza geocode map

Gosairhat (Bengali: গোসাইরহাট) is an upazila of Shariatpur District in the Division of Dhaka, in south central Bangladesh.

== Geography ==
Gosairhat Upazila has a total area of 196.72 square kilometres (75.95 sq mi). It is the southernmost upazila of Shariatpur District. Located on the western bank of the Meghna River, it borders Damudya and Bhedargan upazilas to the north, Haimchar Upazila of Chandpur District to the east, Muladi and Hizla upazilas of Barisal District to the south, and Kalkini Upazila of Madaripur District to the west.

The upazila headquarters is spread over the only two urban areas of the upazila, Dhipur and Daser Jangal mauzas. Together they have a total area of 4.33 square kilometres (1.67 sq mi).

== Demographics ==
Historical population
Year	Pop. (000)	±%
1981	189	—
1991	115	−39.2%
2001	124	+7.8%
2011	158	+27.4%
2022	175	+10.8%
2011 population increased sharply because upazila boundaries were redrawn to include Kuchaipatti Union; Source: Bangladesh Bureau of Statistics

Religions in Gosairhat Upazila (2022)
Religion	Percent
Islam	96.58%
Hinduism	3.38%
Other or not stated	0.04%

According to the 2022 Bangladeshi census, Gosairhat Upazila had 40,868 households and a population of 175,016. 11.36% of the population were under 5 years of age. Gosairhat had a literacy rate (age 7 and over) of 70.93%: 71.91% for males and 70.01% for females, and a sex ratio of 94.29 males for every 100 females. 33,550 (19.17%) lived in urban areas.

According to the 2011 Census of Bangladesh, Gosairhat Upazila had 33,169 households and a population of 157,665. 45,485 (28.85%) were under 10 years of age. Gosairhat had a literacy rate (age 7 and over) of 42.1%, compared to the national average of 51.8%, and a sex ratio of 1072 females per 1000 males. 10,969 (6.96%) lived in urban areas.

The boundaries of the upazila were expanded in 2006 by the addition of Kuchaipatti Union, transferred from the adjacent Hizla Upazila of Barisal District. The transfer accounts for 21,313 of the growth in population from 2001. Without it the population increase from 2001 to 2011 would have been 10.5%.

== Administration ==
Gosairhat, formed as a Thana in 1921, was turned into an upazila in1983.

Gosairhat Upazila is divided into eight union parishads: Alawalpur, Goshairhat, Idilpur, Kodalpur, Kuchaipatti, Nager Para, Nalmuri, and Samantasar. The union parishads are subdivided into 84 mauzas and 221 villages.

In the 2009 upazila elections, Fazlur Rahman was elected Upazila Chairman, while Chowdhury Ahsan Siddiqui and Ferdousi Begum were elected vice chairmen. The Upazila Nirbahi Officer (UNO), who administers the upazila for the central government, is MST Kamrunnahar.

Parliamentary constituency Shariatpur-3 covers Damudya and Gosairhat upazilas, and the Bhedarganj Thana portion of Bhedarganj Upazila. Nahim Razzak of the Bangladesh Awami League was elected Member of Parliament in a 2012 by-election in which he was unopposed.

== Notable people ==
- Golam Ali Chowdhury (1824–1888), landlord and philanthropist

== See also ==
- Education in Bangladesh
- Districts of Bangladesh
- Divisions of Bangladesh
- Upazilas of Bangladesh
