= Damudya Upazila =

Damudya ডামুড্যা
- Upazila
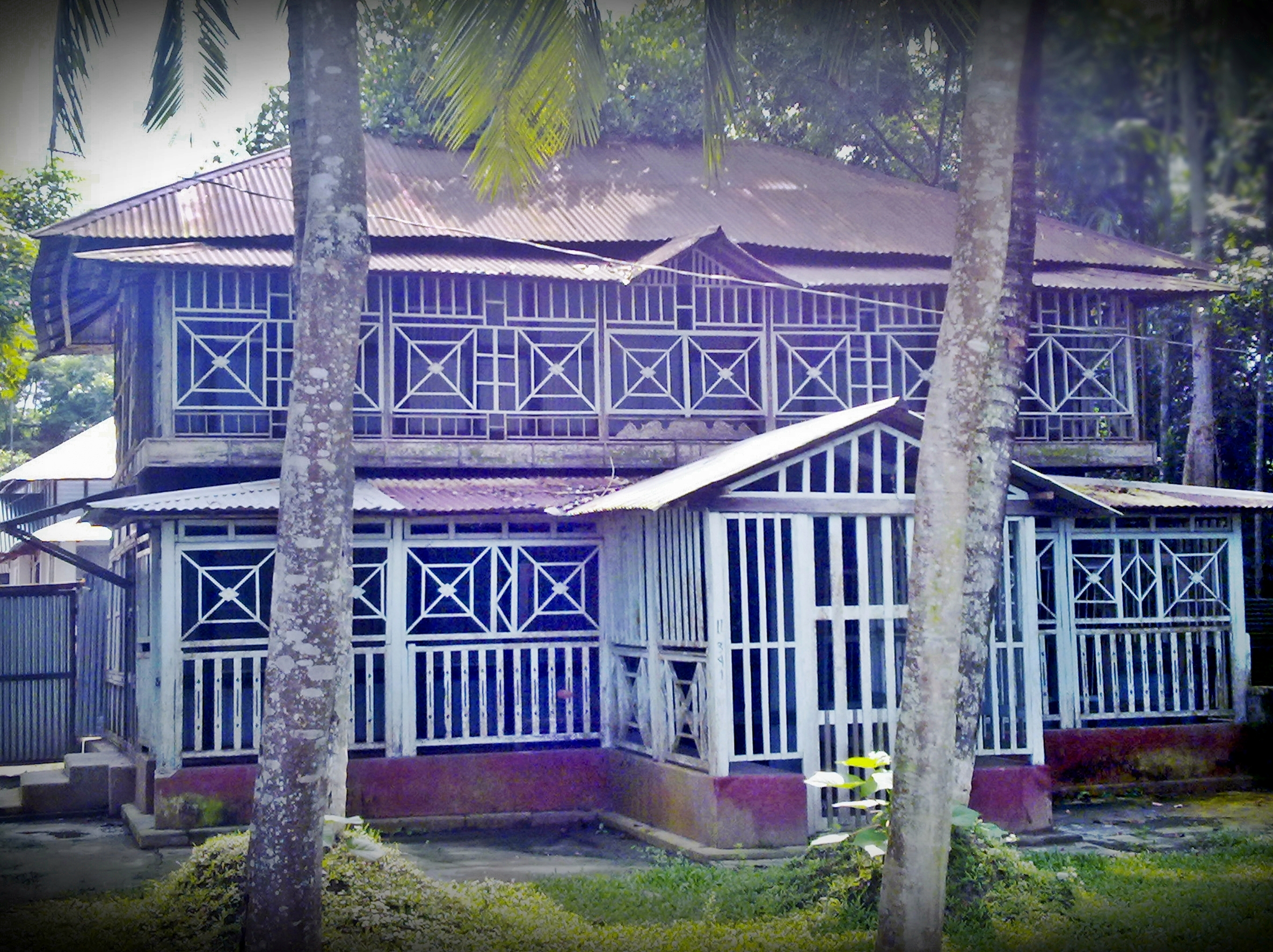
- Munshi Bari, Damudya

- Coordinates: 23°8′N 90°26′E
- Country: Bangladesh
- Division: Dhaka
- District: Shariatpur

Area
  - Total: 90.54 km^{2} (34.96 sq mi)

Population (2022)
  - Total: 123,639
  - Density: 1,366/km^{2} (3,537/sq mi)
- Time zone: UTC+6 (BST)
- Postal code: 8040
- Area code: 06023
- Website: damudya.shariatpur.gov.bd(in Bengali)

Damudya Upazila mauza geocode map

Damudya (Bengali: ডামুড্যা) is an upazila of Shariatpur District in the Division of Dhaka, Bangladesh. Damudya Thana was established in 1975 and upgraded to an upazila in 1982. It was named after its administrative center, the town of Damudya.

== Geography ==
Damudya Upazila has a total area of 90.54 square kilometres (34.96 sq mi). It borders Bhedarganj Upazila to the north, Gosairhat Upazila to the east and south, Madaripur District to the west, and Shariatpur Sadar Upazila to the northwest.

== Demographics ==
Historical population
Year	Pop. (000)	±%
1981	91	—
1991	96	+5.5%
2001	117	+21.9%
2011	109	−6.8%
2022	124	+13.8%
Source: Bangladesh Bureau of Statistics

Religions in Damudya Upazila (2022)
Religion	Percent
Islam	97.60%
Hinduism	2.39%
Other or not stated	0.01%

According to the 2022 Bangladeshi census, Damudya Upazila had 30,148 households and a population of 123,639. 10.24% of the population were under 5 years of age. Damudya had a literacy rate (age 7 and over) of 73.95%: 75.36% for males and 72.75% for females, and a sex ratio of 86.68 males for every 100 females. 27,373 (22.14%) lived in urban areas.

According to the 2011 Census of Bangladesh, Damudya Upazila had 24,193 households and a population of 109,003. 26,899 (24.68%) were under 10 years of age. Damudya had a literacy rate (age 7 and over) of 52.5%, compared to the national average of 51.8%, and a sex ratio of 1123 females per 1000 males. 21,251 (10.95%) lived in urban areas.

== Administration ==
Damudya Upazila is divided into Damudya Municipality and seven union parishads: Darul Aman, Dhanokathi, Islampur, Koneshwar, Purbo Damudya, Shidul Kura, and Sidda. The union parishads are subdivided into 60 mauzas and 120 villages.

Damudya Municipality is subdivided into 9 wards and 11 mahallas.

== Education ==
Purba Madari Pur College is the only college in the upazila.

The Madrasa education system in the upazila includes Damudya Hamidia Kamil Madrasa.

== See also ==
- Upazilas of Bangladesh
- Districts of Bangladesh
- Divisions of Bangladesh
