= Bhedarganj Upazila =

Bhedarganj ভেদরগঞ্জ
- Upazila
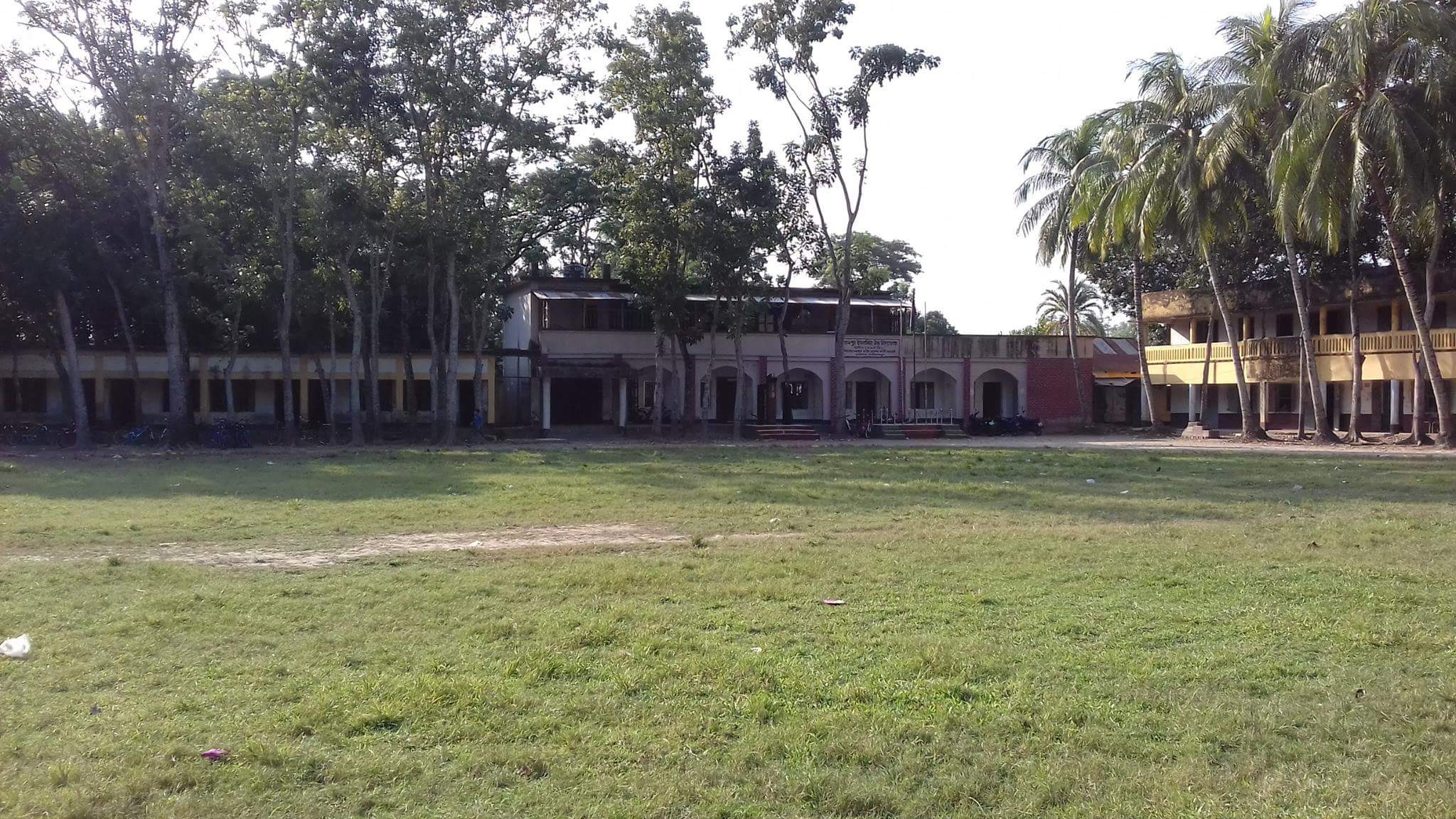
- Sajanpur Islamia High School

- Coordinates: 23°12′N 90°27′E
- Country: Bangladesh
- Division: Dhaka
- District: Shariatpur
- Thana: 1924
- Upazila: 14 September 1983

Government
  - Upazila Chairman: Muhammad Humayun Kabir Mullah

Area
  - Total: 261.90 km^{2} (101.12 sq mi)

Population (2022)
  - Total: 278,306
  - Density: 1,062.6/km^{2} (2,752.2/sq mi)
- Demonym: Bhedarganji
- Time zone: UTC+6 (BST)
- Postal code: 8030
- Website: bhedarganj.shariatpur.gov.bd(in Bengali)

Bhedarganj Upazila mauza geocode map

Bhedarganj (Bengali: ভেদরগঞ্জ, romanized: Bhedorgonj) is an upazila (sub-district) of Shariatpur District in central Bangladesh, located in the Dhaka Division. It is a part of the Greater Faridpur region and is named after its administrative centre, the town of Bhedarganj.

== Geography ==
Bhedarganj Upazila has a total area of 261.90 square kilometres (101.12 sq mi). About seven-tenths is land and three-tenths is water, chiefly the Padma River, which cuts through the northern part of the upazila. It borders Naria Upazila to the west and north, Munshiganj District to the north, Chandpur District to the north and east, Gosairhat and Damudya upazilas to the south, and Shariatpur Sadar Upazila to the west. The Meghna River and the Banglabazar Canal flow through this upazila.

== History ==
In 1924, the Zamindar of Bikrampur, Syed Bhedar Uddin Shah, established the Bhedarganj Thana after his name.

During the Bangladesh Liberation War of 1971, two brawls and a battle took place in Bhedarganj resulting in the deaths of many Bengali freedom fighters. The thana was converted into an upazila on 14 September 1983 and inaugurated by Sultan Mahmud.

== Demographics ==
Historical population
Year	Pop. (000)	±%
1981	166	—
1991	207	+24.7%
2001	238	+15.0%
2011	253	+6.3%
2022	278	+9.9%
Source: Bangladesh Bureau of Statistics

Religions in Bhedarganj Upazila (2022)
Religion	Percent
Islam	99.63%
Hinduism	0.37%

According to the 2022 Bangladeshi census, Bhedarganj Upazila had 66,164 households and a population of 278,306. 11.08% of the population were under 5 years of age. Bhedarganj had a literacy rate (age 7 and over) of 71.17%: 71.91% for males and 70.51% for females, and a sex ratio of 90.32 males for every 100 females. 57,560 (20.68%) lived in urban areas.

According to the 2011 Census of Bangladesh, Bhedarganj Upazila had 53,305 households and a population of 253,234. 68,834 (27.18%) were under 10 years of age. Bhedarganj had a literacy rate (age 7 and over) of 42.7%, compared to the national average of 51.8%, and a sex ratio of 1084 females per 1000 males. 9,193 (3.63%) lived in urban areas.

== Administration ==
Bhedarganj Upazila is divided into Bhedarganj Municipality and 13 union parishads: Arshi Nagar, Char Bhaga, Char Census, Char Kumaria, Chhaygaon, Dhakhin Tarabunia, D. M. Khali, Kachikata, Mahisar, Naryanpur, Rambhadrapur, Sakhipur, and Tarabunia. The union parishads are subdivided into 87 mauzas and 372 villages.

Vice Chairman : Mannan Bepary

Woman Vice Chairman : Lipi Sorder

Upazila Nirbahi Officer (UNO) : Abdullah Al Mamun

Bhedarganj Municipality was established in 1997. It is subdivided into 9 wards and 12 mahallas.

=== Upazila Chairmen ===
List of chairmen
Number	Name	Term
01	AFM Fakhrul Islam Munshi	1985-1986
02	Abul Bashar Bhuiyan	1986-1991
03	Muhammad Humayun Kabir Mullah Khasgazipuri	2008-2013
04	Anwar Husayn Majhi	2014-2019
05	Muhammad Humayun Kabir Mullah Khasgazipuri	2019–present

== Economy and tourism ==
Bhedarganj mainly exports jute.

Notable places of interest in Bhedarganj include the Upazila Jame Mosque and the Kartikpur Zarina Trust Mosque, among the total 450 mosques in the upazila. The zamindar palace of Chhaygaon and the Anandabazar Embankment are also popular sites.

== Education ==
There are four colleges and a university in the upazila. They include Hazi Shariat Ullah College and M. A Reza Degree College. The only university of the district named Z.H. Sikder University of Science and Technology is situated in this upazila.

The Madrasa education system in the upazila includes one Fazil Madrasa.

Madrasas in Bhedarganj
Name	Headteacher/Principal	Notes
Gaidya MS Fazil (Degree) Madrasa	Alhaj Anwar Husayn	
Char Kumaria Islamia Alim Madrasa	Abdur Rabb Hashimi	
Rambhadrapur KI Alim Madrasa	Muhammad Abdus Samad	
Sakhipur Sulaymania Islamia Dakhil Madrasa	AMS Harunur Rashid	
Char Bhaga Shanikandi Qadi Muhammad Dakhil Madrasa	AMS Imdadullah	
Alhaj Qadi Didar Bakhsh Dakhil Madrasa	Aminul Ihsan	
Manua Ahl-e-Sunnah Dakhil Madrasa	Abdur Rabb	
Baher Char Muhammadia Islamia Dakhil Madrasa	Najmul Hasan	
Darul Faid Islamia Dakhil Madrasa	Muhammad Sharif Husayn	
East Gaidya Nurali Madrasa and Orphanage	Abu Zafar	Established in 2014

== Notable people ==
- AKM Enamul Haque Shamim, Deputy Minister of Water Resources
- Parveen Haque Sikder, director of National Bank Limited
- Shamim Sikder, sculptor
- Siraj Sikder, revolutionary
- Shafiqur Rahman (general),Three star general of Bangladesh Army

== See also ==
- Upazilas of Bangladesh
- Districts of Bangladesh
- Divisions of Bangladesh
