= Shariatpur District =

Shariatpur District শরিয়তপুর জেলা
- District of Bangladesh
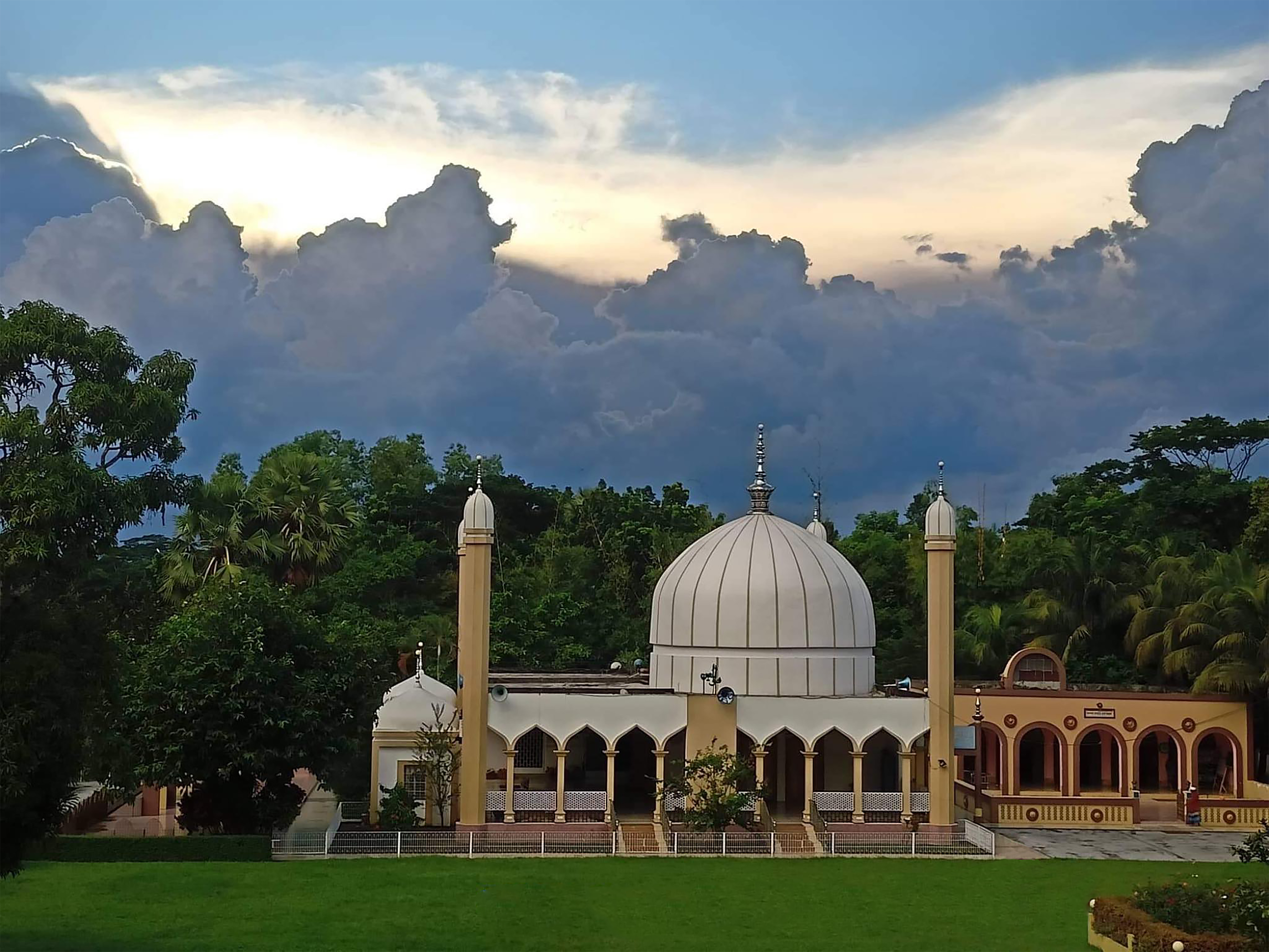
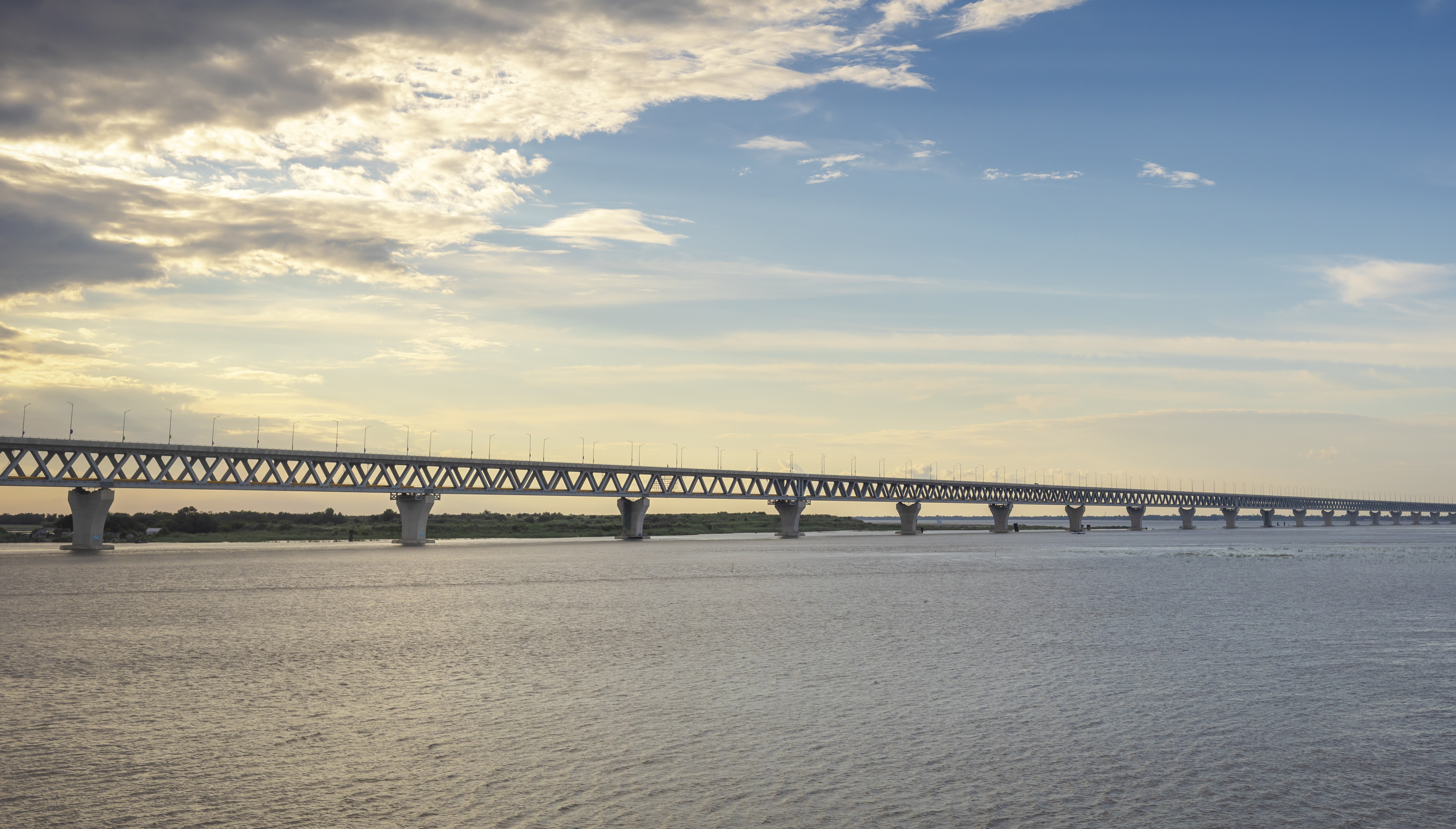
- Clockwise from top-left: Chisti Nagar, Padma Bridge

- Location of Shariatpur in Bangladesh
- Expandable map of Shariatpur
- Coordinates: 23°12.5′N 90°21′E
- Country: Bangladesh
- Division: Dhaka
- Headquarters: Shariatpur

Government
  - Deputy Commissioner: Tahsina Begum

Area
  - Total: 1,102.45 km^{2} (425.66 sq mi)

Population (2022)
  - Total: 1,294,562
  - Density: 1,174.26/km^{2} (3,041.32/sq mi)
- Time zone: UTC+06:00 (BST)
- Postal code: 8000
- Area code: 0662
- ISO 3166 code: BD-62
- HDI (2018): 0.649 medium · 3rd of 21
- Website: www.shariatpur.gov.bd

Shariatpur District (Bengali: শরিয়তপুর জেলা) is a district in Dhaka Division of central Bangladesh. Shariatpur is named after the Islamic revivalist, Haji Shariatullah.

== Etymology ==
Shariatpur was named after Haji Shariatullah (1781–1840), who was the founder of the Faraizi Movement and an eminent Islamic reformer/revivalist during the British Raj.

== Geography ==
Shariatpur is a district in central Bangladesh lying in the centre of Bangladesh. It is bordered by the Padma River to the north which separates it from Munshiganj District, the Meghna River to the east which separates the district from Chandpur, Barisal district to the south and Madaripur district to the west. The land is mostly low-lying alluvial deposits and contains many small streams formed by the movement of the Padma as it moves southeast. A small part of the district lies north of the Padma, but the most part remains to the south. The northeast corner of the district lies roughly where the Padma and Meghna join and contains several chars.

== History ==
Shariatpur shares much of the history of the rest of the Faridpur and Barisal region. Formerly at the border of the regions of Vanga and Samatata, it passed through the hands of various local dynasties before Muslim rule in the late 13th century. A fort of Zamindars Chand Rai and Kedar Rai, of the Baro Bhuyans, was constructed in Shariatpur area. It was established as a district on 1 March 1984.

In 1971, the Pakistan army in collaboration with their local collaborators conducted mass killing and plundering; they also set many houses of the district on fire. During the Bangladesh War of Independence, a number of encounters were held in Shariatpur Sadar Upazila between pro-independence militants and the Pakistan army in which about 313 Pakistani troops were killed. Numerous pro-independence fighters were killed in two encounters and one frontal battle with the Pak army in Bhedarganj Upazila. Nine pro-independence fighters including Ahsanul Hoque and Abdul Wahab were killed in an encounter with the Pakistan army at a place on the southern side of Damudya College, pro-independence militants and Mujib Bahini jointly conducted attack on the Pakistan army by using guerrilla warfare tactics in the upazila. Five fighters were killed in an encounter with the Pakistan army in Gosairhat Upazila. The fighters of Naria raided the Naria Police Station and captured all the arms and ammunitions of the thana. In retaliation, the Pakistan army sacked the nearby villages. During Bangladesh War of Independence, a number of encounters were held between pro-independence fighters and the Pakistan army in Zanjira Upazila in which a number of pro-independence militants were killed.

In recent years, a large number of people from this district have migrated to Italy for work. A huge number of Bangladeshi populations in Italy comes from the Shariatpur district. Recently the Padma Bridge, which crosses the Padma from Dhaka to Barisal, was constructed in this district.

== Geography ==
Shariatpur District is bounded on the north by Munshiganj District on the north, Barisal District on the south, Chandpur District on the east, Madaripur District on the west. Main rivers are Padma, Meghna, Palong, Jayanti, Kirtinasha, and Dharmaganj.

Area of Shariatpur district is 1,102.45 km^{2} (425.66 sq mi). It consists of 6 upazilas, 6 municipalities, 65 Union Parishad, 616 Mouza, 1243 villages, 213,677 households.

== Demography ==
Historical population
Year	Pop.	±% p.a.
1974	716,975	—
1981	845,662	+2.39%
1991	953,021	+1.20%
2001	1,082,300	+1.28%
2011	1,155,824	+0.66%
2022	1,294,562	+1.04%

According to the 2022 Census of Bangladesh, Shariatpur District had 308,964 households and a population of 1,294,562. The population density was 1,103 people per km^{2}. Shariatpur District had a literacy rate (age 7 and over) of 72.90%, compared to the national average of 74.80%, and a sex ratio of 1083 females per 1000 males. 265,911 (20.54%) inhabitants were under 10 years of age. Approximately, 23.90% of the population lived in urban areas. The ethnic population was 438.

Religions in Shariatpur District (2022)
Religion	Percent
Islam	96.68%
Hinduism	3.30%
Other or not stated	0.02%

Religion in present-day Shariatpur district
Religion	1941 (Note: 1941 data is for Palong, Bhedarganj, Gosairhat, Naria and Janjira thanas of Faridpur district, which roughly corresponds to the present district. Upazila borders have shifted slightly since then.)		1981		1991		2001		2011		2022	
Religion	Pop.	%	Pop.	%	Pop.	%	Pop.	%	Pop.	%	Pop.	%
Islam	490,991	76.77%	803,214	94.98%	910,568	95.55%	1,041,584	96.24%	1,114,301	96.41%	1,251,521	96.68%
Hinduism	148,551	23.23%	42,191	4.99%	41,013	4.30%	40,491	3.74%	41,330	3.58%	42,724	3.30%
Others (Note: Including Jainism, Christianity, Buddhism, Zoroastrianism, Judaism, Ad-Dharmis, or not stated)	34	0.01%	257	0.03%	1,440	0.15%	225	0.02%	193	0.01%	317	0.02%
Total Population	639,576	100%	845,662	100%	953,021	100%	1,082,300	100%	1,155,824	100%	1,294,562	100%

Muslims make up 96.68% and Hindus 3.30% of the population. The Muslim population has constantly increased while the Hindu population has stayed relatively constant.

== Administration ==
Shariatpur District upazila geocode map

There are six upazilas (sub-districts) under this district, namely:

1. Shariatpur Sadar Upazila
2. Damudya Upazila
3. Naria Upazila
4. Zanjira Upazila
5. Bhedarganj Upazila
6. Gosairhat Upazila

== Education ==
There are 772 primary schools, 19 lower secondary schools, 83 secondary schools and 42 madrasas in Shariatpur. There are also 3 public and 13 private colleges, 1 polytechnic Institute, 1 vocational school and college, 1 private university and one private medical college.

== See also ==
- Districts of Bangladesh
- Dhaka Division
