= List of members of the 13th Jatiya Sangsad =

13th Jatiya Sangsad
←	12th	14th	→
- Flag of the Jatiya Sangsad

Overview
- Legislative body: Jatiya Sangsad
- Jurisdiction: Bangladesh
- Meeting place: Jatiya Sangsad Bhaban, Sher-e-Bangla Nagar, Dhaka, Bangladesh
- Term: 17 February 2026 –
- Election: 2026
- Government: Bangladesh Nationalist Party
- Opposition: Bangladesh Jamaat-e-Islami

Sovereign
- Members: 350
- President: Mohammed Shahabuddin; Hafiz Uddin Ahmad (Acting); Mirza Fakhrul Islam Alamgir

House of the Nation
- Speaker: Hafiz Uddin Ahmad
- Deputy Speaker: Kayser Kamal
- Leader of the House: Tarique Rahman
- Leader of the opposition: Shafiqur Rahman

The following is a list of Members of Parliament (MPs) elected to the 13th Jatiya Sangsad (Parliament of Bangladesh) from 300 Bangladeshi constituencies after the 2026 general election. About two-thirds of the elected members were first timers. The 25th national cabinet was subsequently formed under Prime Minister Tarique Rahman.

== Members ==
=== Members of Parliament ===
Constituency		Name	Party
1	Panchagarh-1	Muhammad Nawshad Zamir	Bangladesh Nationalist Party
2	Panchagarh-2	Farhad Hossain Azad	Bangladesh Nationalist Party
3	Thakurgaon-1	Mirza Fakhrul Islam Alamgir Become president: 21 August 2026	Bangladesh Nationalist Party
3	Thakurgaon-1	Mirza Faisal Amin By-election: 29 October 2026	Bangladesh Nationalist Party
4	Thakurgaon-2	Abdus Salam	Bangladesh Nationalist Party
5	Thakurgaon-3	Jahidur Rahman	Bangladesh Nationalist Party
6	Dinajpur-1	Md. Manjurul Islam	Bangladesh Nationalist Party
7	Dinajpur-2	Md. Sadiq Riaz	Bangladesh Nationalist Party
8	Dinajpur-3	Syed Jahangir Alam	Bangladesh Nationalist Party
9	Dinajpur-4	Akhtaruzzaman Mia	Bangladesh Nationalist Party
10	Dinajpur-5	AZM Rezwanul Haque	Independent
11	Dinajpur-6	A. Z. M. Zahid Hossain	Bangladesh Nationalist Party
12	Nilphamari-1	Abdus Sattar	Bangladesh Jamaat-e-Islami
13	Nilphamari-2	Al Faruk Abdul Latif	Bangladesh Jamaat-e-Islami
14	Nilphamari-3	Obaidullah Salafi	Bangladesh Jamaat-e-Islami
15	Nilphamari-4	Abdul Muntakim	Bangladesh Jamaat-e-Islami
16	Lalmonirhat-1	Md. Hasan Rajib Prodhan	Bangladesh Nationalist Party
17	Lalmonirhat-2	Md Rokon Uddin Babul	Bangladesh Nationalist Party
18	Lalmonirhat-3	Asadul Habib Dulu	Bangladesh Nationalist Party
19	Rangpur-1	Md Rayhan Shirazi	Bangladesh Jamaat-e-Islami
20	Rangpur-2	A. T. M. Azharul Islam	Bangladesh Jamaat-e-Islami
21	Rangpur-3	Md. Mahbubur Rahman Belal	Bangladesh Jamaat-e-Islami
22	Rangpur-4	Akhter Hossen	National Citizen Party
23	Rangpur-5	Md Golam Rabbani	Bangladesh Jamaat-e-Islami
24	Rangpur-6	Md. Nurul Amin	Bangladesh Jamaat-e-Islami
25	Kurigram-1	Md. Anwarul Islam	Bangladesh Jamaat-e-Islami
26	Kurigram-2	Atiqur Rahman Mojahid	National Citizen Party
27	Kurigram-3	Md Mahbubul Alam	Bangladesh Jamaat-e-Islami
28	Kurigram-4	Md. Mostafizur Rahman	Bangladesh Jamaat-e-Islami
29	Gaibandha-1	Md Mazedur Rahman	Bangladesh Jamaat-e-Islami
30	Gaibandha-2	Md. Abdul Karim	Bangladesh Jamaat-e-Islami
31	Gaibandha-3	Abul Kawsar Mohammad Nazrul Islam	Bangladesh Jamaat-e-Islami
32	Gaibandha-4	Shamim Kaisar Lincoln	Bangladesh Nationalist Party
33	Gaibandha-5	Md. Abdul Wares	Bangladesh Jamaat-e-Islami
34	Joypurhat-1	Md Fazlur Rahman Sayed	Bangladesh Jamaat-e-Islami
35	Joypurhat-2	Md. Abdul Bari	Bangladesh Nationalist Party
36	Bogura-1	Kazi Rafiqul Islam	Bangladesh Nationalist Party
37	Bogura-2	Mir Shahe Alam	Bangladesh Nationalist Party
38	Bogura-3	Md. Abdul Mohit Talukder	Bangladesh Nationalist Party
39	Bogura-4	Md. Mosharraf Hossain	Bangladesh Nationalist Party
40	Bogura-5	Golam Mohammad Siraj	Bangladesh Nationalist Party
41	Bogura-6	Rezaul Karim Badsha By-election: 9 April 2026	Bangladesh Nationalist Party
42	Bogura-7	Morshed Milton	Bangladesh Nationalist Party
43	Chapai Nawabganj-1	Md. Keramat Ali	Bangladesh Jamaat-e-Islami
44	Chapai Nawabganj-2	Mu. Mizanur Rahman	Bangladesh Jamaat-e-Islami
45	Chapai Nawabganj-3	Md. Nurul Islam Bulbul	Bangladesh Jamaat-e-Islami
46	Naogaon-1	Md. Mostafizur Rahman	Bangladesh Nationalist Party
47	Naogaon-2	Md. Enamul Haque	Bangladesh Jamaat-e-Islami
48	Naogaon-3	Md. Fazley Houda	Bangladesh Nationalist Party
49	Naogaon-4	Ekramul Bari Tipu	Bangladesh Nationalist Party
50	Naogaon-5	Md. Zahidul Islam Dhalu	Bangladesh Nationalist Party
51	Naogaon-6	Seikh Md. Rejaul Islam	Bangladesh Nationalist Party
52	Rajshahi-1	Mujibur Rahman	Bangladesh Jamaat-e-Islami
53	Rajshahi-2	Mizanur Rahman Minu	Bangladesh Nationalist Party
54	Rajshahi-3	Shofiqul Haque Milon	Bangladesh Nationalist Party
55	Rajshahi-4	Md. Abdul Bari Sarder	Bangladesh Jamaat-e-Islami
56	Rajshahi-5	Nazrul Islam Mondol	Bangladesh Nationalist Party
57	Rajshahi-6	Abu Sayeed Chand	Bangladesh Nationalist Party
58	Natore-1	Farzana Sharmin	Bangladesh Nationalist Party
59	Natore-2	Ruhul Quddus Talukdar	Bangladesh Nationalist Party
60	Natore-3	Md. Anwarul Islam	Bangladesh Nationalist Party
61	Natore-4	Md. Abdul Aziz	Bangladesh Nationalist Party
62	Sirajganj-1	Md. Salim Reza	Bangladesh Nationalist Party
63	Sirajganj-2	Iqbal Hassan Mahmood	Bangladesh Nationalist Party
64	Sirajganj-3	Md. Aynul Haque	Bangladesh Nationalist Party
65	Sirajganj-4	Rafiqul Islam Khan	Bangladesh Jamaat-e-Islami
66	Sirajganj-5	Amirul Islam Khan Alim	Bangladesh Nationalist Party
67	Sirajganj-6	M. A. Muhit	Bangladesh Nationalist Party
68	Pabna-1	Nazibur Rahman Momen	Bangladesh Jamaat-e-Islami
69	Pabna-2	AKM Salim Reza Habib	Bangladesh Nationalist Party
70	Pabna-3	Muhammad Ali Asgar	Bangladesh Jamaat-e-Islami
71	Pabna-4	Md. Abu Taleb Mondol	Bangladesh Jamaat-e-Islami
72	Pabna-5	Shamsur Rahman Simul Biswas	Bangladesh Nationalist Party
73	Meherpur-1	Md. Tajuddin Khan	Bangladesh Jamaat-e-Islami
74	Meherpur-2	Md. Nazmul Huda	Bangladesh Jamaat-e-Islami
75	Kushtia-1	Bachhu Mollah	Bangladesh Nationalist Party
76	Kushtia-2	Abdul Gafur	Bangladesh Jamaat-e-Islami
77	Kushtia-3	Amir Hamza	Bangladesh Jamaat-e-Islami
78	Kushtia-4	Afjal Hossain	Bangladesh Jamaat-e-Islami
79	Chuadanga-1	Md. Masud Parves	Bangladesh Jamaat-e-Islami
80	Chuadanga-2	Md. Ruhul Amin	Bangladesh Jamaat-e-Islami
81	Jhenaidah-1	Md. Asaduzzaman	Bangladesh Nationalist Party
82	Jhenaidah-2	Ali Azam Md Abu Bakar	Bangladesh Jamaat-e-Islami
83	Jhenaidah-3	Md. Motiar Rahman	Bangladesh Jamaat-e-Islami
84	Jhenaidah-4	Md. Abu Talib	Bangladesh Jamaat-e-Islami
85	Jashore-1	Muhammad Azizur Rahman	Bangladesh Jamaat-e-Islami
86	Jashore-2	Mohammad Moslehuddin Farid	Bangladesh Jamaat-e-Islami
87	Jashore-3	Anindya Islam Amit	Bangladesh Nationalist Party
88	Jashore-4	Golam Rasul	Bangladesh Jamaat-e-Islami
89	Jashore-5	Gazi Enamul Haque	Bangladesh Jamaat-e-Islami
90	Jashore-6	Md. Moktar Ali	Bangladesh Jamaat-e-Islami
91	Magura-1	Monowar Hossain Khan	Bangladesh Nationalist Party
92	Magura-2	Nitai Roy Chowdhury	Bangladesh Nationalist Party
93	Narail-1	Biswas Jahangir Alam	Bangladesh Nationalist Party
94	Narail-2	Ataur Rahman Bachchu	Bangladesh Jamaat-e-Islami
95	Bagerhat-1	Md. Moshiur Rahman Khan	Bangladesh Jamaat-e-Islami
96	Bagerhat-2	Shaikh Monzurul Haque Rahad	Bangladesh Jamaat-e-Islami
97	Bagerhat-3	Sheikh Faridul Islam	Bangladesh Nationalist Party
98	Bagerhat-4	Md. Abdul Aleem	Bangladesh Jamaat-e-Islami
99	Khulna-1	Amir Ejaz Khan	Bangladesh Nationalist Party
100	Khulna-2	Zahangir Hossain Helal	Bangladesh Jamaat-e-Islami
101	Khulna-3	Rakibul Islam Bokul	Bangladesh Nationalist Party
102	Khulna-4	SK Azizul Bari Helal	Bangladesh Nationalist Party
103	Khulna-5	Mohammad Ali Asghar Lobby	Bangladesh Nationalist Party
104	Khulna-6	Abul Kalam Azad	Bangladesh Jamaat-e-Islami
105	Satkhira-1	Md. Izzat Ullah	Bangladesh Jamaat-e-Islami
106	Satkhira-2	Muhammad Abdul Khaleq	Bangladesh Jamaat-e-Islami
107	Satkhira-3	Muhammad Rabiul Bassar	Bangladesh Jamaat-e-Islami
108	Satkhira-4	Gazi Nazrul Islam Expelled from Jamaat-e-Islami: 22 July 2026	Bangladesh Jamaat-e-Islami
108	Satkhira-4	Gazi Nazrul Islam Expelled from Jamaat-e-Islami: 22 July 2026	Independent
109	Barguna-1	Mahmudul Hossain Waliullah	Islami Andolan Bangladesh
110	Barguna-2	Nurul Islam Moni	Bangladesh Nationalist Party
111	Patuakhali-1	Altaf Hossain Chowdhury	Bangladesh Nationalist Party
112	Patuakhali-2	Shafiqul Islam Masud	Bangladesh Jamaat-e-Islami
113	Patuakhali-3	Nurul Haque Nur	Gono Odhikar Parishad
114	Patuakhali-4	ABM Mosharraf Hossain	Bangladesh Nationalist Party
115	Bhola-1	Andaleeve Rahman	Bangladesh Jatiya Party
116	Bhola-2	Hafiz Ibrahim	Bangladesh Nationalist Party
117	Bhola-3	Hafiz Uddin Ahmad	Bangladesh Nationalist Party
118	Bhola-4	Mohammad Nurul Islam	Bangladesh Nationalist Party
119	Barishal-1	Zahir Uddin Swapan	Bangladesh Nationalist Party
120	Barishal-2	Sardar Sarfuddin Ahmed	Bangladesh Nationalist Party
121	Barishal-3	Zainul Abedin	Bangladesh Nationalist Party
122	Barishal-4	Md. Razib Ahsan	Bangladesh Nationalist Party
123	Barishal-5	Majibur Rahman Sarwar	Bangladesh Nationalist Party
124	Barishal-6	Abul Hossain Khan	Bangladesh Nationalist Party
125	Jhalokati-1	Rafiqul Islam Jamal	Bangladesh Nationalist Party
126	Jhalokati-2	Israt Sultana Elen Bhutto	Bangladesh Nationalist Party
127	Pirojpur-1	Masood Sayeedi	Bangladesh Jamaat-e-Islami
128	Pirojpur-2	Ahammad Sohel Monzoor	Bangladesh Nationalist Party
129	Pirojpur-3	Ruhul Amin Dulal	Bangladesh Nationalist Party
130	Tangail-1	Fakir Mahbub Anam Swapan	Bangladesh Nationalist Party
131	Tangail-2	Abdus Salam Pintu	Bangladesh Nationalist Party
132	Tangail-3	Lutfor Rahman Khan Azad	Independent
133	Tangail-4	Lutfor Rahman Khan Matin	Bangladesh Nationalist Party
134	Tangail-5	Sultan Salauddin Tuku	Bangladesh Nationalist Party
135	Tangail-6	Md. Robiul Awal	Bangladesh Nationalist Party
136	Tangail-7	Abul Kalam Azad Siddiqui	Bangladesh Nationalist Party
137	Tangail-8	Ahmed Azam Khan	Bangladesh Nationalist Party
138	Jamalpur-1	M. Rashiduzzaman Millat	Bangladesh Nationalist Party
139	Jamalpur-2	Sultan Mahmud Babu	Bangladesh Nationalist Party
140	Jamalpur-3	Md. Mustafizur Rahman Babul	Bangladesh Nationalist Party
141	Jamalpur-4	Md. Faridul Kabir Talukder	Bangladesh Nationalist Party
142	Jamalpur-5	Shah Md. Wares Ali Mamun	Bangladesh Nationalist Party
143	Sherpur-1	Md. Rashedul Islam Rashed	Bangladesh Jamaat-e-Islami
144	Sherpur-2	Mohammed Fahim Chowdhury	Bangladesh Nationalist Party
145	Sherpur-3	Mahmudul Haque Rubel	Bangladesh Nationalist Party
146	Mymensingh-1	Salman Omar Rubel	Independent
147	Mymensingh-2	Mufti Muhammadullah	Bangladesh Khelafat Majlis
148	Mymensingh-3	M. Iqbal Hossain	Bangladesh Nationalist Party
149	Mymensingh-4	Md. Abu Wahab Akanda Wahid	Bangladesh Nationalist Party
150	Mymensingh-5	Mohammed Zakir Hossain	Bangladesh Nationalist Party
151	Mymensingh-6	Md. Quamrul Hassan	Bangladesh Jamaat-e-Islami
152	Mymensingh-7	Mahabubur Rahman Liton	Bangladesh Nationalist Party
153	Mymensingh-8	Lutfullahel Majed	Bangladesh Nationalist Party
154	Mymensingh-9	Yasser Khan Choudhury	Bangladesh Nationalist Party
155	Mymensingh-10	Md. Akhtaruzzaman Bachchu	Bangladesh Nationalist Party
156	Mymensingh-11	Fakhar Uddin Ahmed	Bangladesh Nationalist Party
157	Netrokona-1	Kayser Kamal	Bangladesh Nationalist Party
158	Netrokona-2	Md. Anwarul Haque	Bangladesh Nationalist Party
159	Netrokona-3	Rafiqul Islam Hilali	Bangladesh Nationalist Party
160	Netrokona-4	Lutfozzaman Babar	Bangladesh Nationalist Party
161	Netrokona-5	Mashum Mostafa	Bangladesh Jamaat-e-Islami
162	Kishoreganj-1	Mazharul Islam	Bangladesh Nationalist Party
163	Kishoreganj-2	Jalal Uddin Jalal	Bangladesh Nationalist Party
164	Kishoreganj-3	Osman Faruk Resigned: 15 November 2026	Bangladesh Nationalist Party
164	Kishoreganj-3	Vacant	
165	Kishoreganj-4	Md Fazlur Rahman	Bangladesh Nationalist Party
166	Kishoreganj-5	Sheikh Mujibur Rahman Iqbal	Independent
167	Kishoreganj-6	Md. Shariful Alam	Bangladesh Nationalist Party
168	Manikganj-1	S A Jinnah Kabir	Bangladesh Nationalist Party
169	Manikganj-2	Moinul Islam Khan	Bangladesh Nationalist Party
170	Manikganj-3	Afroza Khanam Rita	Bangladesh Nationalist Party
171	Munshiganj-1	Sheikh Md. Abdullah	Bangladesh Nationalist Party
172	Munshiganj-2	Abdus Salam Azad	Bangladesh Nationalist Party
173	Munshiganj-3	Md. Quamruzzaman Ratan	Bangladesh Nationalist Party
174	Dhaka-1	Khandaker Abu Ashfaq	Bangladesh Nationalist Party
175	Dhaka-2	Amanullah Aman	Bangladesh Nationalist Party
176	Dhaka-3	Gayeshwar Chandra Roy	Bangladesh Nationalist Party
177	Dhaka-4	Syed Zainul Abedin	Bangladesh Jamaat-e-Islami
178	Dhaka-5	Mohammad Kamal Hossain	Bangladesh Jamaat-e-Islami
179	Dhaka-6	Ishraque Hossain	Bangladesh Nationalist Party
180	Dhaka-7	Hamidur Rahman	Bangladesh Nationalist Party
181	Dhaka-8	Mirza Abbas	Bangladesh Nationalist Party
182	Dhaka-9	Habibur Rashid Habib	Bangladesh Nationalist Party
183	Dhaka-10	Sheikh Rabiul Alam	Bangladesh Nationalist Party
184	Dhaka-11	Nahid Islam	National Citizen Party
185	Dhaka-12	Saiful Alam Khan Milon	Bangladesh Jamaat-e-Islami
186	Dhaka-13	Bobby Hajjaj	Bangladesh Nationalist Party
187	Dhaka-14	Mir Ahmad Bin Quasem	Bangladesh Jamaat-e-Islami
188	Dhaka-15	Shafiqur Rahman	Bangladesh Jamaat-e-Islami
189	Dhaka-16	Md. Abdul Baten	Bangladesh Jamaat-e-Islami
190	Dhaka-17	Tarique Rahman	Bangladesh Nationalist Party
191	Dhaka-18	SM Jahangir Hossain	Bangladesh Nationalist Party
192	Dhaka-19	Dewan Md. Salauddin	Bangladesh Nationalist Party
193	Dhaka-20	Md Tamiz Uddin	Bangladesh Nationalist Party
194	Gazipur-1	Md. Mazibur Rahman	Bangladesh Nationalist Party
195	Gazipur-2	M Manjurul Karim Roni	Bangladesh Nationalist Party
196	Gazipur-3	S. M. Rafiqul Islam	Bangladesh Nationalist Party
197	Gazipur-4	Salahuddin Aiyubi	Bangladesh Jamaat-e-Islami
198	Gazipur-5	AKM Fazlul Haque Milon	Bangladesh Nationalist Party
199	Narsingdi-1	Khairul Kabir Khokon	Bangladesh Nationalist Party
200	Narsingdi-2	Abdul Moyeen Khan	Bangladesh Nationalist Party
201	Narsingdi-3	Manzur Elahi	Bangladesh Nationalist Party
202	Narsingdi-4	Sardar Shakhawat Hossain Bokul	Bangladesh Nationalist Party
203	Narsingdi-5	Ashraf Uddin	Bangladesh Nationalist Party
204	Narayanganj-1	Mustafizur Rahman Bhuiyan Dipu	Bangladesh Nationalist Party
205	Narayanganj-2	Nazrul Islam Azad	Bangladesh Nationalist Party
206	Narayanganj-3	Azharul Islam Mannan	Bangladesh Nationalist Party
207	Narayanganj-4	Abdullah Al Amin	National Citizen Party
208	Narayanganj-5	Abul Kalam	Bangladesh Nationalist Party
209	Rajbari-1	Ali Newaz Mahmud Khayyam	Bangladesh Nationalist Party
210	Rajbari-2	Harunur Rashid	Bangladesh Nationalist Party
211	Faridpur-1	Md. Elias Molla	Bangladesh Jamaat-e-Islami
212	Faridpur-2	Shama Obaed	Bangladesh Nationalist Party
213	Faridpur-3	Nayab Yusuf Ahmed	Bangladesh Nationalist Party
214	Faridpur-4	Md. Shahidul Islam	Bangladesh Nationalist Party
215	Gopalganj-1	Md. Selimuzzaman Mollah	Bangladesh Nationalist Party
216	Gopalganj-2	K M Babar	Bangladesh Nationalist Party
217	Gopalganj-3	S M Jilani	Bangladesh Nationalist Party
218	Madaripur-1	Syed Uddin Ahmad Hanzala	Bangladesh Khelafat Majlis
219	Madaripur-2	Jahander Ali Miah	Bangladesh Nationalist Party
220	Madaripur-3	Anisur Rahaman	Bangladesh Nationalist Party
221	Shariatpur-1	Sayeed Ahmed Aslam	Bangladesh Nationalist Party
222	Shariatpur-2	Safiqur Rahman Kiran	Bangladesh Nationalist Party
223	Shariatpur-3	Mia Nuruddin Ahmed Apu	Bangladesh Nationalist Party
224	Sunamganj-1	Kamruzzaman Kamrul	Bangladesh Nationalist Party
225	Sunamganj-2	Nasir Uddin Choudhury	Bangladesh Nationalist Party
226	Sunamganj-3	Mohammad Koysor Ahmed	Bangladesh Nationalist Party
227	Sunamganj-4	Nurul Islam Nurul	Bangladesh Nationalist Party
228	Sunamganj-5	Kalim Uddin Ahmed	Bangladesh Nationalist Party
229	Sylhet-1	Khandakar Abdul Muktadir	Bangladesh Nationalist Party
230	Sylhet-2	Tahsina Rushdir Luna	Bangladesh Nationalist Party
231	Sylhet-3	Mohammad Abdul Malek	Bangladesh Nationalist Party
232	Sylhet-4	Ariful Haque Chowdhury	Bangladesh Nationalist Party
233	Sylhet-5	Mufti Abul Hasan	Khelafat Majlis
234	Sylhet-6	Emran Ahmed Chowdhury	Bangladesh Nationalist Party
235	Moulvibazar-1	Nasir Uddin Ahmed Mithu	Bangladesh Nationalist Party
236	Moulvibazar-2	Shawkat Hossain Saku	Bangladesh Nationalist Party
237	Moulvibazar-3	M. Naser Rahman	Bangladesh Nationalist Party
238	Moulvibazar-4	Mujibur Rahman Chowdhury	Bangladesh Nationalist Party
239	Habiganj-1	Reza Kibria	Bangladesh Nationalist Party
240	Habiganj-2	Abu Mansur Sakhawat Hasan	Bangladesh Nationalist Party
241	Habiganj-3	G K Gouse	Bangladesh Nationalist Party
242	Habiganj-4	S.M. Faisal	Bangladesh Nationalist Party
243	Brahmanbaria-1	M A Hannan	Bangladesh Nationalist Party
244	Brahmanbaria-2	Rumeen Farhana	Independent
245	Brahmanbaria-3	Khaled Hossain Mahbub	Bangladesh Nationalist Party
246	Brahmanbaria-4	Mushfiqur Rahman	Bangladesh Nationalist Party
247	Brahmanbaria-5	Md. Abdul Mannan	Bangladesh Nationalist Party
248	Brahmanbaria-6	Zonayed Saki	Ganosanhati Andolan
249	Cumilla-1	Khandaker Mosharraf Hossain	Bangladesh Nationalist Party
250	Cumilla-2	Md. Salim Bhuiyan	Bangladesh Nationalist Party
251	Cumilla-3	Kazi Shah Mofazzal Hossain Kaikobad	Bangladesh Nationalist Party
252	Cumilla-4	Hasnat Abdullah	National Citizen Party
253	Cumilla-5	Md. Jashim Uddin	Bangladesh Nationalist Party
254	Cumilla-6	Monirul Haq Chowdhury	Bangladesh Nationalist Party
255	Cumilla-7	Atikul Alam Shawon	Independent
256	Cumilla-8	Zakaria Taher Sumon	Bangladesh Nationalist Party
257	Cumilla-9	Md. Abul Kalam	Bangladesh Nationalist Party
258	Cumilla-10	Md. Mobasher Alam Bhuiyan	Bangladesh Nationalist Party
259	Cumilla-11	Syed Abdullah Muhammad Taher	Bangladesh Jamaat-e-Islami
260	Chandpur-1	A. N. M. Ehsanul Hoque Milan	Bangladesh Nationalist Party
261	Chandpur-2	Md. Jalal Uddin	Bangladesh Nationalist Party
262	Chandpur-3	Sheikh Farid Ahmed Manik	Bangladesh Nationalist Party
263	Chandpur-4	Md. Abdul Hannan	Independent
264	Chandpur-5	Md. Mominul Haque	Bangladesh Nationalist Party
265	Feni-1	Munshi Rafiqul Alam	Bangladesh Nationalist Party
266	Feni-2	Joynal Abedin	Bangladesh Nationalist Party
267	Feni-3	Abdul Awal Mintoo	Bangladesh Nationalist Party
268	Noakhali-1	Mahbub Uddin Khokon	Bangladesh Nationalist Party
269	Noakhali-2	Zainul Abdin Farroque	Bangladesh Nationalist Party
270	Noakhali-3	Barkat Ullah Bulu	Bangladesh Nationalist Party
271	Noakhali-4	Md. Shahjahan	Bangladesh Nationalist Party
272	Noakhali-5	Muhammad Fakrul Islam	Bangladesh Nationalist Party
273	Noakhali-6	Abdul Hannan Masud	National Citizen Party
274	Lakshmipur-1	Shahadat Hossain Salim	Bangladesh Nationalist Party
275	Lakshmipur-2	Abul Khair Bhuiyan	Bangladesh Nationalist Party
276	Lakshmipur-3	Shahid Uddin Chowdhury Anee	Bangladesh Nationalist Party
277	Lakshmipur-4	A. B. M. Ashraf Uddin	Bangladesh Nationalist Party
278	Chattogram-1	Nurul Amin	Bangladesh Nationalist Party
279	Chattogram-2	Sarowar Alamgir	Bangladesh Nationalist Party
280	Chattogram-3	Mostafa Kamal Pasha	Bangladesh Nationalist Party
281	Chattogram-4	Vacant (Note: Bangladesh Election Commission postponed the results.)	
282	Chattogram-5	Mir Mohammad Helal Uddin	Bangladesh Nationalist Party
283	Chattogram-6	Giasuddin Quader Chowdhury	Bangladesh Nationalist Party
284	Chattogram-7	Humam Quader Chowdhury	Bangladesh Nationalist Party
285	Chattogram-8	Ershad Ullah	Bangladesh Nationalist Party
286	Chattogram-9	Mohammad Abu Sufian	Bangladesh Nationalist Party
287	Chattogram-10	Sayeed Al Noman	Bangladesh Nationalist Party
288	Chattogram-11	Amir Khasru Mahmud Chowdhury	Bangladesh Nationalist Party
289	Chattogram-12	Enamul Haque Enam	Bangladesh Nationalist Party
290	Chattogram-13	Sarwar Jamal Nizam	Bangladesh Nationalist Party
291	Chattogram-14	Jashim Uddin Ahammed	Bangladesh Nationalist Party
292	Chattogram-15	Shajahan Chowdhury	Bangladesh Jamaat-e-Islami
293	Chattogram-16	Mohammad Zahirul Islam	Bangladesh Jamaat-e-Islami
294	Cox's Bazar-1	Salahuddin Ahmed	Bangladesh Nationalist Party
295	Cox's Bazar-2	Alamgir Mohammad Mahfuzullah Farid	Bangladesh Nationalist Party
296	Cox's Bazar-3	Lutfur Rahman Kajal	Bangladesh Nationalist Party
297	Cox's Bazar-4	Shahjahan Chowdhury	Bangladesh Nationalist Party
298	Khagrachhari	Wadud Bhuiyan	Bangladesh Nationalist Party
299	Rangamati	Dipen Dewan	Bangladesh Nationalist Party
300	Bandarban	Sa Ching Prue Jerry	Bangladesh Nationalist Party

=== Reserved women seats ===
Women Seat		Name	Party
301	Women's Seat-1	Selima Rahman	Bangladesh Nationalist Party
302	Women's Seat-2	Shirin Sultana	Bangladesh Nationalist Party
303	Women's Seat-3	Rasheda Begum Hira	Bangladesh Nationalist Party
304	Women's Seat-4	Rehana Akter Ranu	Bangladesh Nationalist Party
305	Women's Seat-5	Newaz Halima Arli	Bangladesh Nationalist Party
306	Women's Seat-6	Farida Yasmin	Bangladesh Nationalist Party
307	Women's Seat-7	Bilkis Islam	Bangladesh Nationalist Party
308	Women's Seat-8	Shakila Farzana	Bangladesh Nationalist Party
309	Women's Seat-9	Helen Zerin Khan	Bangladesh Nationalist Party
310	Women's Seat-10	Nilufar Chowdhury Moni	Bangladesh Nationalist Party
311	Women's Seat-11	Nipun Roy Chowdhury	Bangladesh Nationalist Party
312	Women's Seat-12	Zeeba Amina Khan	Bangladesh Nationalist Party
313	Women's Seat-13	Mahmuda Habiba	Bangladesh Nationalist Party
314	Women's Seat-14	Mst Sabira Sultana	Bangladesh Nationalist Party
315	Women's Seat-15	Sunsila Jabrin	Bangladesh Nationalist Party
316	Women's Seat-16	Sanjida Islam Tulee	Bangladesh Nationalist Party
317	Women's Seat-17	Sultana Ahmed	Bangladesh Nationalist Party
318	Women's Seat-18	Fahmida Haque	Bangladesh Nationalist Party
319	Women's Seat-19	Anna Minj	Bangladesh Nationalist Party
320	Women's Seat-20	Suborna Sikder Thakur	Bangladesh Nationalist Party
321	Women's Seat-21	Shamim Ara Begum Swapna	Bangladesh Nationalist Party
322	Women's Seat-22	Shammi Akter	Bangladesh Nationalist Party
323	Women's Seat-23	Ferdousi Ahmed Mishti Resigned: 1 October 2026	Bangladesh Nationalist Party
323	Women's Seat-23	Eliza Zaman By-election: 2 November 2026	Bangladesh Nationalist Party
324	Women's Seat-24	Bithika Binte Hossain	Bangladesh Nationalist Party
325	Women's Seat-25	Suraia Zarin Rony	Bangladesh Nationalist Party
326	Women's Seat-26	Mansura Akter	Bangladesh Nationalist Party
327	Women's Seat-27	Jahrat Adib Chowdhury	Bangladesh Nationalist Party
328	Women's Seat-28	Momtaj Alo Ahmed	Bangladesh Nationalist Party
329	Women's Seat-29	Fahima Nasrin	Bangladesh Nationalist Party
330	Women's Seat-30	Arifa Sultana Ruma	Bangladesh Nationalist Party
331	Women's Seat-31	Sanjida Yasmeen	Bangladesh Nationalist Party
332	Women's Seat-32	Nadia Pathan Papon	Bangladesh Nationalist Party
333	Women's Seat-33	Shacot Ara Akter	Bangladesh Nationalist Party
334	Women's Seat-34	Madhabi Marma	Bangladesh Nationalist Party
335	Women's Seat-35	Salina Sultana Nishita	Bangladesh Nationalist Party
336	Women's Seat-36	Rezeka Sultana Fancy	Bangladesh Nationalist Party
337	Women's Seat-37	Nurun Nesa Siddiqua	Bangladesh Jamaat-e-Islami
338	Women's Seat-38	Marzia Begum	Bangladesh Jamaat-e-Islami
339	Women's Seat-39	Subikunnahar	Bangladesh Jamaat-e-Islami
340	Women's Seat-40	Nazmun Nahar Nilu	Bangladesh Jamaat-e-Islami
341	Women's Seat-41	Mahfuza Hannan	Bangladesh Jamaat-e-Islami
342	Women's Seat-42	Sajeda Samad	Bangladesh Jamaat-e-Islami
343	Women's Seat-43	Shamsunnahar Begum	Bangladesh Jamaat-e-Islami
344	Women's Seat-44	Mardia Mumtaz	Bangladesh Jamaat-e-Islami
345	Women's Seat-45	Rokeya Begum	Bangladesh Jamaat-e-Islami
346	Women's Seat-46	Mahmuda Alam Mitu	National Citizen Party
347	Women's Seat-47	Tasmia Pradhan	Jatiya Ganotantrik Party
348	Women's Seat-48	Mahbuba Hakim	Bangladesh Khelafat Majlis
349	Women's Seat-49	Sultana Jasmine	Independent
350	Women's Seat-50	Nusrat Tabassum	National Citizen Party
