= Member of Parliament (Bangladesh) =

Democratically elected representative in the unicameral Parliament of Bangladesh

- Emblem of the Jatiya Sangsad

- Flag of the Jatiya Sangsad

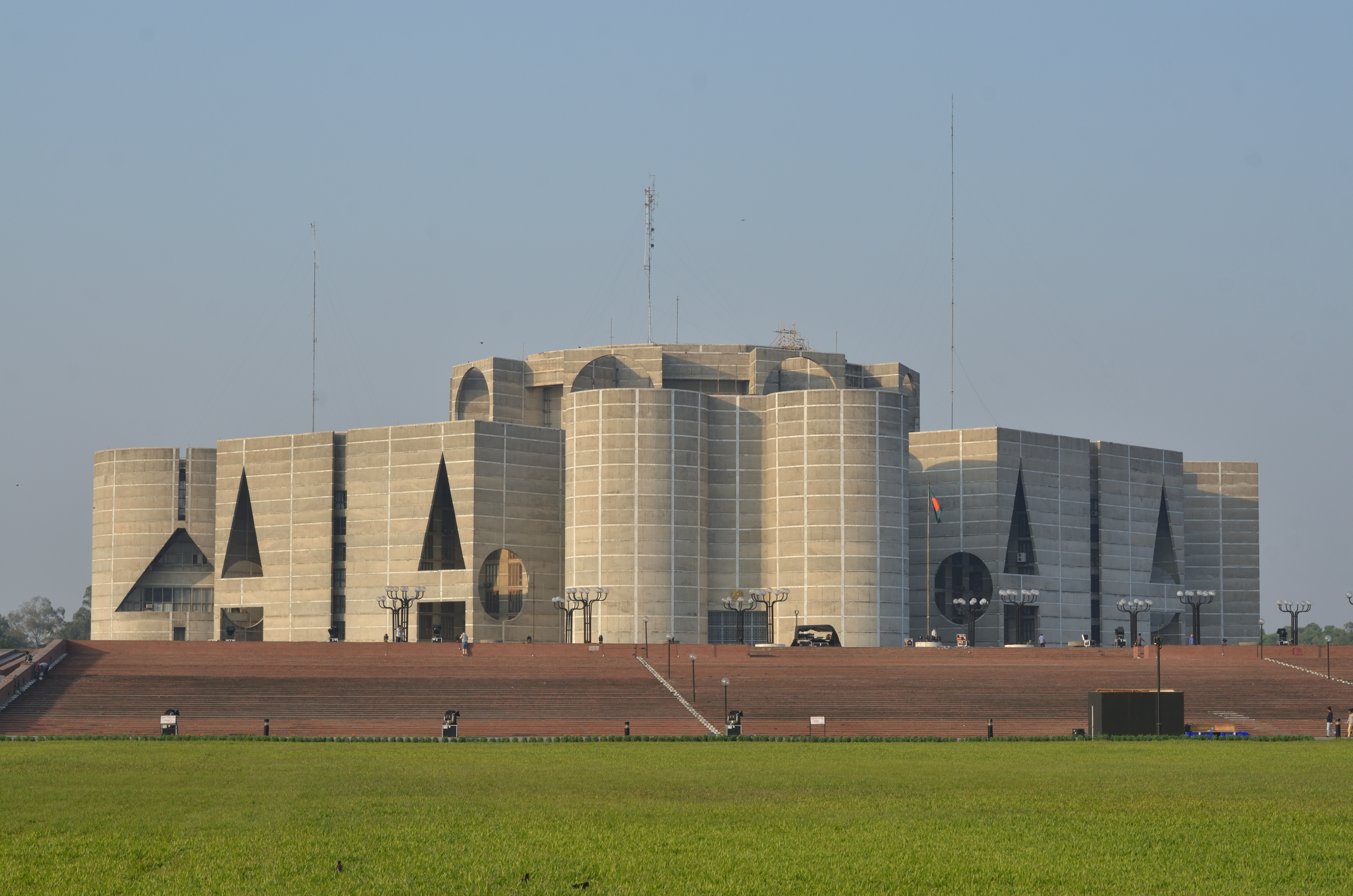
- Incumbent; 13th Jatiya Sangsad since 17 February 2026
- House of the Nation
- Style: The Honorable (formal); His/Her Excellency (diplomatic)
- Type: Member of Parliament
- Abbreviation: MP
- Member of: Jatiya Sangsad
- Reports to: Speaker
- Seat: Jatiya Sangsad Bhaban
- Appointer: Electorate of the Bangladesh
- Term length: Five years; renewable
- Constituting instrument: Article 65 of Constitution of Bangladesh
- Formation: 7 March 1973 (53 years ago)
- First holder: 1st Jatiya Sangsad
- Salary: ৳172800 (US$1,400) per month (incl. allowances)
- Website: www.parliament.gov.bd

A member of parliament in Bangladesh is a member of the Jatiya Sangsad, or House of the Nation, the unicameral legislature of Bangladesh. A majority of members are elected directly in general elections, while a minority of seats are reserved exclusively for women and allocated on a proportional basis. The Constitution specifies that Parliament consists of 300 directly elected members, while 50 seats are reserved for women. The individual who leads the largest party or alliance in parliament usually becomes Prime Minister of Bangladesh.

== Eligibility criteria ==
In order to qualify to stand for election to Parliament, an individual is required to be –

- A citizen of Bangladesh.
- A minimum of twenty-five years of age.

== Disqualification grounds ==
An individual is disqualified from standing for parliament in the event they –

- Are declared by a competent court to be of unsound mind.
- Are an undischarged insolvent.
- Acquire the citizenship of a foreign state.
- Have been convicted of a criminal offence involving moral turpitude and have been sentenced to imprisonment for a period of more than two years. (Note: Does not apply if a period of five years has lapsed since their release.)
- Have been convicted of an offence under the Bangladesh Collaborators (Special Tribunals) Order, 1972.
- Hold an office of profit in service of the Republic that disqualifies them from election. (Note: Exemptions include the president, the prime minister, the speaker, the deputy speaker, a minister, minister of state or a deputy minister.)
- Are disqualified from election under any law.

== Term ==
A Member of Parliament serves until the dissolution of parliament, which can be no more than five years after its first sitting. But in the event of a war, parliament can pass an Act of Parliament extending the parliamentary term by no more than a year at a time. Parliament must be in session within six months of the conclusion of a war.

== Duties of members of parliament ==
The broad responsibilities of members of parliament include –

- Legislative responsibility, as MPs are required to pass laws.
- Oversight responsibility, as MPs are required to hold the executive government to account and ensure they discharge their duties satisfactorily.
- Power of the purse: MPs are required to pass a Finance Act for each fiscal year that makes provision for the collection of revenue and expenditures of the government.

== Remuneration, privileges, and allowances ==
Members of parliament are entitled to an annual salary of ৳660000 (US$5,400) as well as allowances. This is in accordance with Article 68 of the Constitution, which makes provision for remuneration, allowances, and privileges for members.

== Size ==
The Constitution specifies that Parliament consists of 300 directly elected members from general seats elected by use of first past the post who represent single-seat constituencies, while 50 seats are reserved exclusively for women and are allocated on a proportional basis. After an election, the Election Commission allocates reserved seats to parties pursuant to the number of general seats they won. A party then presents a list of candidates, each requiring a presenter and a seconder. If the number of candidates presented and seats allocated is equal, then there is no election, and the reserved seats are filled in accordance with the candidate lists prepared by parties. In the event there are more candidates than seat allocations, the 300 MPs elected from general seats vote through use of the single transferable vote system to determine the reserved seats. In reality, there has never been an election for reserved seats, as parties have never nominated more candidates than they have been allocated.

== Members ==
The current parliament is the 13th legislature, which followed the 2026 general election. The new parliament took place on 17 February 2026.

=== Member of Parliament ===
No.	Constituency	Name	Party
1	Panchagarh-1	Muhammad Nawshad Zamir	Bangladesh Nationalist Party
2	Panchagarh-2	Farhad Hossain Azad	Bangladesh Nationalist Party
3	Thakurgaon-1	Vacant	
4	Thakurgaon-2	Abdus Salam	Bangladesh Nationalist Party
5	Thakurgaon-3	Jahidur Rahman	Bangladesh Nationalist Party
6	Dinajpur-1	Md. Manjurul Islam	Bangladesh Nationalist Party
7	Dinajpur-2	Md. Sadiq Riaz	Bangladesh Nationalist Party
8	Dinajpur-3	Syed Jahangir Alam	Bangladesh Nationalist Party
9	Dinajpur-4	Akhtaruzzaman Mia	Bangladesh Nationalist Party
10	Dinajpur-5	AZM Rezwanul Haque	Independent politician
11	Dinajpur-6	A. Z. M. Zahid Hossain	Bangladesh Nationalist Party
12	Nilphamari-1	Abdus Sattar	Bangladesh Jamaat-e-Islami
13	Nilphamari-2	Al Faruk Abdul Latif	Bangladesh Jamaat-e-Islami
14	Nilphamari-3	Obaidullah Salafi	Bangladesh Jamaat-e-Islami
15	Nilphamari-4	Abdul Muntakim	Bangladesh Jamaat-e-Islami
16	Lalmonirhat-1	Md. Hasan Rajib Prodhan	Bangladesh Nationalist Party
17	Lalmonirhat-2	Md Rokon Uddin Babul	Bangladesh Nationalist Party
18	Lalmonirhat-3	Asadul Habib Dulu	Bangladesh Nationalist Party
19	Rangpur-1	Md Rayhan Shirazi	Bangladesh Jamaat-e-Islami
20	Rangpur-2	A. T. M. Azharul Islam	Bangladesh Jamaat-e-Islami
21	Rangpur-3	Md. Mahbubur Rahman Belal	Bangladesh Jamaat-e-Islami
22	Rangpur-4	Akhter Hossen	National Citizen Party
23	Rangpur-5	Md Golam Rabbani	Bangladesh Jamaat-e-Islami
24	Rangpur-6	Md. Nurul Amin	Bangladesh Jamaat-e-Islami
25	Kurigram-1	Md. Anwarul Islam	Bangladesh Jamaat-e-Islami
26	Kurigram-2	Atiqur Rahman Mojahid	National Citizen Party
27	Kurigram-3	Md Mahbubul Alam	Bangladesh Jamaat-e-Islami
28	Kurigram-4	Md. Mostafizur Rahman	Bangladesh Jamaat-e-Islami
29	Gaibandha-1	Md Mazedur Rahman	Bangladesh Jamaat-e-Islami
30	Gaibandha-2	Md. Abdul Karim	Bangladesh Jamaat-e-Islami
31	Gaibandha-3	Abul Kawsar Mohammad Nazrul Islam	Bangladesh Jamaat-e-Islami
32	Gaibandha-4	Shamim Kaisar Lincoln	Bangladesh Nationalist Party
33	Gaibandha-5	Md. Abdul Wares	Bangladesh Jamaat-e-Islami
34	Joypurhat-1	Md Fazlur Rahman Sayed	Bangladesh Jamaat-e-Islami
35	Joypurhat-2	Md. Abdul Bari	Bangladesh Nationalist Party
36	Bogura-1	Kazi Rafiqul Islam	Bangladesh Nationalist Party
37	Bogura-2	Mir Shahe Alam	Bangladesh Nationalist Party
38	Bogura-3	Md. Abdul Mohit Talukder	Bangladesh Nationalist Party
39	Bogura-4	Md. Mosharraf Hossain	Bangladesh Nationalist Party
40	Bogura-5	Golam Mohammad Siraj	Bangladesh Nationalist Party
41	Bogura-6	Rezaul Karim Badsha By-election: 9 April 2026	Bangladesh Nationalist Party
42	Bogura-7	Morshed Milton	Bangladesh Nationalist Party
43	Chapai Nawabganj-1	Md. Keramat Ali	Bangladesh Jamaat-e-Islami
44	Chapai Nawabganj-2	Mu. Mizanur Rahman	Bangladesh Jamaat-e-Islami
45	Chapai Nawabganj-3	Md. Nurul Islam Bulbul	Bangladesh Jamaat-e-Islami
46	Naogaon-1	Md. Mostafizur Rahman	Bangladesh Nationalist Party
47	Naogaon-2	Md. Enamul Haque	Bangladesh Jamaat-e-Islami
48	Naogaon-3	Md. Fazley Houda	Bangladesh Nationalist Party
49	Naogaon-4	Ekramul Bari Tipu	Bangladesh Nationalist Party
50	Naogaon-5	Md. Zahidul Islam Dhalu	Bangladesh Nationalist Party
51	Naogaon-6	Seikh Md. Rejaul Islam	Bangladesh Nationalist Party
52	Rajshahi-1	Mujibur Rahman	Bangladesh Jamaat-e-Islami
53	Rajshahi-2	Mizanur Rahman Minu	Bangladesh Nationalist Party
54	Rajshahi-3	Shofiqul Haque Milon	Bangladesh Nationalist Party
55	Rajshahi-4	Md. Abdul Bari Sarder	Bangladesh Jamaat-e-Islami
56	Rajshahi-5	Nazrul Islam Mondol	Bangladesh Nationalist Party
57	Rajshahi-6	Abu Sayeed Chand	Bangladesh Nationalist Party
58	Natore-1	Farzana Sharmin	Bangladesh Nationalist Party
59	Natore-2	Ruhul Quddus Talukdar	Bangladesh Nationalist Party
60	Natore-3	Md. Anwarul Islam	Bangladesh Nationalist Party
61	Natore-4	Md. Abdul Aziz	Bangladesh Nationalist Party
62	Sirajganj-1	Md. Salim Reza	Bangladesh Nationalist Party
63	Sirajganj-2	Iqbal Hassan Mahmood	Bangladesh Nationalist Party
64	Sirajganj-3	Md. Aynul Haque	Bangladesh Nationalist Party
65	Sirajganj-4	Rafiqul Islam Khan	Bangladesh Jamaat-e-Islami
66	Sirajganj-5	Amirul Islam Khan Alim	Bangladesh Nationalist Party
67	Sirajganj-6	M. A. Muhit	Bangladesh Nationalist Party
68	Pabna-1	Nazibur Rahman Momen	Bangladesh Jamaat-e-Islami
69	Pabna-2	AKM Salim Reza Habib	Bangladesh Nationalist Party
70	Pabna-3	Muhammad Ali Asgar	Bangladesh Jamaat-e-Islami
71	Pabna-4	Md. Abu Taleb Mondol	Bangladesh Jamaat-e-Islami
72	Pabna-5	Shamsur Rahman Simul Biswas	Bangladesh Nationalist Party
73	Meherpur-1	Md. Tajuddin Khan	Bangladesh Jamaat-e-Islami
74	Meherpur-2	Md. Nazmul Huda	Bangladesh Jamaat-e-Islami
75	Kushtia-1	Bachhu Mollah	Bangladesh Nationalist Party
76	Kushtia-2	Abdul Gafur	Bangladesh Jamaat-e-Islami
77	Kushtia-3	Amir Hamza	Bangladesh Jamaat-e-Islami
78	Kushtia-4	Afjal Hossain	Bangladesh Jamaat-e-Islami
79	Chuadanga-1	Md. Masud Parves	Bangladesh Jamaat-e-Islami
80	Chuadanga-2	Md. Ruhul Amin	Bangladesh Jamaat-e-Islami
81	Jhenaidah-1	Md. Asaduzzaman	Bangladesh Nationalist Party
82	Jhenaidah-2	Ali Azam Md Abu Bakar	Bangladesh Jamaat-e-Islami
83	Jhenaidah-3	Md. Motiar Rahman	Bangladesh Jamaat-e-Islami
84	Jhenaidah-4	Md. Abu Talib	Bangladesh Jamaat-e-Islami
85	Jashore-1	Muhammad Azizur Rahman	Bangladesh Jamaat-e-Islami
86	Jashore-2	Mohammad Moslehuddin Farid	Bangladesh Jamaat-e-Islami
87	Jashore-3	Anindya Islam Amit	Bangladesh Nationalist Party
88	Jashore-4	Golam Rasul	Bangladesh Jamaat-e-Islami
89	Jashore-5	Gazi Enamul Haque	Bangladesh Jamaat-e-Islami
90	Jashore-6	Md. Moktar Ali	Bangladesh Jamaat-e-Islami
91	Magura-1	Monowar Hossain Khan	Bangladesh Nationalist Party
92	Magura-2	Nitai Roy Chowdhury	Bangladesh Nationalist Party
93	Narail-1	Biswas Jahangir Alam	Bangladesh Nationalist Party
94	Narail-2	Ataur Rahman Bachchu	Bangladesh Jamaat-e-Islami
95	Bagerhat-1	Md. Moshiur Rahman Khan	Bangladesh Jamaat-e-Islami
96	Bagerhat-2	Shaikh Monzurul Haque Rahad	Bangladesh Jamaat-e-Islami
97	Bagerhat-3	Sheikh Faridul Islam	Bangladesh Nationalist Party
98	Bagerhat-4	Md. Abdul Aleem	Bangladesh Jamaat-e-Islami
99	Khulna-1	Amir Ejaz Khan	Bangladesh Nationalist Party
100	Khulna-2	Zahangir Hossain Helal	Bangladesh Jamaat-e-Islami
101	Khulna-3	Rakibul Islam Bokul	Bangladesh Nationalist Party
102	Khulna-4	SK Azizul Bari Helal	Bangladesh Nationalist Party
103	Khulna-5	Mohammad Ali Asghar Lobby	Bangladesh Nationalist Party
104	Khulna-6	Abul Kalam Azad	Bangladesh Jamaat-e-Islami
105	Satkhira-1	Md. Izzat Ullah	Bangladesh Jamaat-e-Islami
106	Satkhira-2	Muhammad Abdul Khaleq	Bangladesh Jamaat-e-Islami
107	Satkhira-3	Muhammad Rabiul Bassar	Bangladesh Jamaat-e-Islami
108	Satkhira-4	Gazi Nazrul Islam Expelled from Bangladesh Jamaat-e-Islami: 22 July 2026	Independent politician
109	Barguna-1	Mahmudul Hossain Waliullah	Islami Andolan Bangladesh
110	Barguna-2	Nurul Islam Moni	Bangladesh Nationalist Party
111	Patuakhali-1	Altaf Hossain Chowdhury	Bangladesh Nationalist Party
112	Patuakhali-2	Shafiqul Islam Masud	Bangladesh Jamaat-e-Islami
113	Patuakhali-3	Nurul Haque Nur	Gono Odhikar Parishad
114	Patuakhali-4	ABM Mosharraf Hossain	Bangladesh Nationalist Party
115	Bhola-1	Andaleeve Rahman	Bangladesh Jatiya Party
116	Bhola-2	Hafiz Ibrahim	Bangladesh Nationalist Party
117	Bhola-3	Hafiz Uddin Ahmad	Bangladesh Nationalist Party
118	Bhola-4	Mohammad Nurul Islam	Bangladesh Nationalist Party
119	Barishal-1	Zahir Uddin Swapan	Bangladesh Nationalist Party
120	Barishal-2	Sardar Sarfuddin Ahmed	Bangladesh Nationalist Party
121	Barishal-3	Zainul Abedin	Bangladesh Nationalist Party
122	Barishal-4	Md. Razib Ahsan	Bangladesh Nationalist Party
123	Barishal-5	Majibur Rahman Sarwar	Bangladesh Nationalist Party
124	Barishal-6	Abul Hossain Khan	Bangladesh Nationalist Party
125	Jhalokati-1	Rafiqul Islam Jamal	Bangladesh Nationalist Party
126	Jhalokati-2	Israt Sultana Elen Bhutto	Bangladesh Nationalist Party
127	Pirojpur-1	Masood Sayeedi	Bangladesh Jamaat-e-Islami
128	Pirojpur-2	Ahammad Sohel Monzoor	Bangladesh Nationalist Party
129	Pirojpur-3	Ruhul Amin Dulal	Bangladesh Nationalist Party
130	Tangail-1	Fakir Mahbub Anam Swapan	Bangladesh Nationalist Party
131	Tangail-2	Abdus Salam Pintu	Bangladesh Nationalist Party
132	Tangail-3	Lutfor Rahman Khan Azad	Independent politician
133	Tangail-4	Lutfor Rahman Khan Matin	Bangladesh Nationalist Party
134	Tangail-5	Sultan Salauddin Tuku	Bangladesh Nationalist Party
135	Tangail-6	Md. Robiul Awal	Bangladesh Nationalist Party
136	Tangail-7	Abul Kalam Azad Siddiqui	Bangladesh Nationalist Party
137	Tangail-8	Ahmed Azam Khan	Bangladesh Nationalist Party
138	Jamalpur-1	M. Rashiduzzaman Millat	Bangladesh Nationalist Party
139	Jamalpur-2	Sultan Mahmud Babu	Bangladesh Nationalist Party
140	Jamalpur-3	Md. Mustafizur Rahman Babul	Bangladesh Nationalist Party
141	Jamalpur-4	Md. Faridul Kabir Talukder	Bangladesh Nationalist Party
142	Jamalpur-5	Shah Md. Wares Ali Mamun	Bangladesh Nationalist Party
143	Sherpur-1	Md. Rashedul Islam Rashed	Bangladesh Jamaat-e-Islami
144	Sherpur-2	Mohammed Fahim Chowdhury	Bangladesh Nationalist Party
145	Sherpur-3	Mahmudul Haque Rubel	Bangladesh Nationalist Party
146	Mymensingh-1	Salman Omar Rubel	Independent politician
147	Mymensingh-2	Mufti Muhammadullah	Bangladesh Khelafat Majlis
148	Mymensingh-3	M. Iqbal Hossain	Bangladesh Nationalist Party
149	Mymensingh-4	Md. Abu Wahab Akand Wahid	Bangladesh Nationalist Party
150	Mymensingh-5	Mohammed Zakir Hossain	Bangladesh Nationalist Party
151	Mymensingh-6	Md. Quamrul Hassan	Bangladesh Jamaat-e-Islami
152	Mymensingh-7	Mahabubur Rahman Liton	Bangladesh Nationalist Party
153	Mymensingh-8	Lutfullahel Majed	Bangladesh Nationalist Party
154	Mymensingh-9	Yasser Khan Choudhury	Bangladesh Nationalist Party
155	Mymensingh-10	Md. Akhtaruzzaman Bachchu	Bangladesh Nationalist Party
156	Mymensingh-11	Fakhar Uddin Ahmed	Bangladesh Nationalist Party
157	Netrokona-1	Kayser Kamal	Bangladesh Nationalist Party
158	Netrokona-2	Md. Anwarul Haque	Bangladesh Nationalist Party
159	Netrokona-3	Rafiqul Islam Hilali	Bangladesh Nationalist Party
160	Netrokona-4	Lutfozzaman Babar	Bangladesh Nationalist Party
161	Netrokona-5	Mashum Mostafa	Bangladesh Jamaat-e-Islami
162	Kishoreganj-1	Mazharul Islam	Bangladesh Nationalist Party
163	Kishoreganj-2	Jalal Uddin Jalal	Bangladesh Nationalist Party
164	Kishoreganj-3	Osman Faruk	Bangladesh Nationalist Party
165	Kishoreganj-4	Md Fazlur Rahman	Bangladesh Nationalist Party
166	Kishoreganj-5	Sheikh Mujibur Rahman Iqbal	Independent politician
167	Kishoreganj-6	Md. Shariful Alam	Bangladesh Nationalist Party
168	Manikganj-1	S A Jinnah Kabir	Bangladesh Nationalist Party
169	Manikganj-2	Moinul Islam Khan	Bangladesh Nationalist Party
170	Manikganj-3	Afroza Khanam Rita	Bangladesh Nationalist Party
171	Munshiganj-1	Sheikh Md. Abdullah	Bangladesh Nationalist Party
172	Munshiganj-2	Abdus Salam Azad	Bangladesh Nationalist Party
173	Munshiganj-3	Md. Quamruzzaman Ratan	Bangladesh Nationalist Party
174	Dhaka-1	Khandaker Abu Ashfaq	Bangladesh Nationalist Party
175	Dhaka-2	Amanullah Aman	Bangladesh Nationalist Party
176	Dhaka-3	Gayeshwar Chandra Roy	Bangladesh Nationalist Party
177	Dhaka-4	Syed Zainul Abedin	Bangladesh Jamaat-e-Islami
178	Dhaka-5	Mohammad Kamal Hossain	Bangladesh Jamaat-e-Islami
179	Dhaka-6	Ishraque Hossain	Bangladesh Nationalist Party
180	Dhaka-7	Hamidur Rahman	Bangladesh Nationalist Party
181	Dhaka-8	Mirza Abbas	Bangladesh Nationalist Party
182	Dhaka-9	Habibur Rashid Habib	Bangladesh Nationalist Party
183	Dhaka-10	Sheikh Rabiul Alam	Bangladesh Nationalist Party
184	Dhaka-11	Nahid Islam	National Citizen Party
185	Dhaka-12	Saiful Alam Khan Milon	Bangladesh Jamaat-e-Islami
186	Dhaka-13	Bobby Hajjaj	Bangladesh Nationalist Party
187	Dhaka-14	Mir Ahmad Bin Quasem	Bangladesh Jamaat-e-Islami
188	Dhaka-15	Shafiqur Rahman	Bangladesh Jamaat-e-Islami
189	Dhaka-16	Md. Abdul Baten	Bangladesh Jamaat-e-Islami
190	Dhaka-17	Tarique Rahman	Bangladesh Nationalist Party
191	Dhaka-18	SM Jahangir Hossain	Bangladesh Nationalist Party
192	Dhaka-19	Dewan Md. Salauddin	Bangladesh Nationalist Party
193	Dhaka-20	Md Tamiz Uddin	Bangladesh Nationalist Party
194	Gazipur-1	Md. Mazibur Rahman	Bangladesh Nationalist Party
195	Gazipur-2	M Manjurul Karim Roni	Bangladesh Nationalist Party
196	Gazipur-3	S. M. Rafiqul Islam	Bangladesh Nationalist Party
197	Gazipur-4	Salahuddin Aiyubi	Bangladesh Jamaat-e-Islami
198	Gazipur-5	AKM Fazlul Haque Milon	Bangladesh Nationalist Party
199	Narsingdi-1	Khairul Kabir Khokon	Bangladesh Nationalist Party
200	Narsingdi-2	Abdul Moyeen Khan	Bangladesh Nationalist Party
201	Narsingdi-3	Manzur Elahi	Bangladesh Nationalist Party
202	Narsingdi-4	Sardar Shakhawat Hossain Bokul	Bangladesh Nationalist Party
203	Narsingdi-5	Ashraf Uddin	Bangladesh Nationalist Party
204	Narayanganj-1	Mustafizur Rahman Bhuiyan Dipu	Bangladesh Nationalist Party
205	Narayanganj-2	Nazrul Islam Azad	Bangladesh Nationalist Party
206	Narayanganj-3	Azharul Islam Mannan	Bangladesh Nationalist Party
207	Narayanganj-4	Abdullah Al Amin	National Citizen Party
208	Narayanganj-5	Abul Kalam	Bangladesh Nationalist Party
209	Rajbari-1	Ali Newaz Mahmud Khayyam	Bangladesh Nationalist Party
210	Rajbari-2	Harunur Rashid	Bangladesh Nationalist Party
211	Faridpur-1	Md. Elias Molla	Bangladesh Jamaat-e-Islami
212	Faridpur-2	Shama Obaed	Bangladesh Nationalist Party
213	Faridpur-3	Nayab Yusuf Ahmed	Bangladesh Nationalist Party
214	Faridpur-4	Md. Shahidul Islam	Bangladesh Nationalist Party
215	Gopalganj-1	Md. Selimuzzaman Mollah	Bangladesh Nationalist Party
216	Gopalganj-2	K M Babar	Bangladesh Nationalist Party
217	Gopalganj-3	S M Jilani	Bangladesh Nationalist Party
218	Madaripur-1	Syed Uddin Ahmad Hanzala	Bangladesh Khelafat Majlis
219	Madaripur-2	Jahander Ali Miah	Bangladesh Nationalist Party
220	Madaripur-3	Anisur Rahaman	Bangladesh Nationalist Party
221	Shariatpur-1	Sayeed Ahmed Aslam	Bangladesh Nationalist Party
222	Shariatpur-2	Safiqur Rahman Kiran	Bangladesh Nationalist Party
223	Shariatpur-3	Mia Nuruddin Ahmed Apu	Bangladesh Nationalist Party
224	Sunamganj-1	Kamruzzaman Kamrul	Bangladesh Nationalist Party
225	Sunamganj-2	Nasir Uddin Choudhury	Bangladesh Nationalist Party
226	Sunamganj-3	Mohammad Koysor Ahmed	Bangladesh Nationalist Party
227	Sunamganj-4	Nurul Islam Nurul	Bangladesh Nationalist Party
228	Sunamganj-5	Kalim Uddin Ahmed	Bangladesh Nationalist Party
229	Sylhet-1	Khandakar Abdul Muktadir	Bangladesh Nationalist Party
230	Sylhet-2	Tahsina Rushdir Luna	Bangladesh Nationalist Party
231	Sylhet-3	Mohammad Abdul Malek	Bangladesh Nationalist Party
232	Sylhet-4	Ariful Haque Chowdhury	Bangladesh Nationalist Party
233	Sylhet-5	Mufti Abul Hasan	Khelafat Majlish
234	Sylhet-6	Emran Ahmed Chowdhury	Bangladesh Nationalist Party
235	Moulvibazar-1	Nasir Uddin Ahmed Mithu	Bangladesh Nationalist Party
236	Moulvibazar-2	Shawkat Hossain Saku	Bangladesh Nationalist Party
237	Moulvibazar-3	M. Naser Rahman	Bangladesh Nationalist Party
238	Moulvibazar-4	Mujibur Rahman Chowdhury	Bangladesh Nationalist Party
239	Habiganj-1	Reza Kibria	Bangladesh Nationalist Party
240	Habiganj-2	Abu Mansur Sakhawat Hasan	Bangladesh Nationalist Party
241	Habiganj-3	G K Gouse	Bangladesh Nationalist Party
242	Habiganj-4	S.M. Faisal	Bangladesh Nationalist Party
243	Brahmanbaria-1	M A Hannan	Bangladesh Nationalist Party
244	Brahmanbaria-2	Rumeen Farhana	Independent politician
245	Brahmanbaria-3	Khaled Hossain Mahbub	Bangladesh Nationalist Party
246	Brahmanbaria-4	Mushfiqur Rahman	Bangladesh Nationalist Party
247	Brahmanbaria-5	Md. Abdul Mannan	Bangladesh Nationalist Party
248	Brahmanbaria-6	Zonayed Saki	Ganosanhati Andolan
249	Cumilla-1	Khandaker Mosharraf Hossain	Bangladesh Nationalist Party
250	Cumilla-2	Md. Salim Bhuiyan	Bangladesh Nationalist Party
251	Cumilla-3	Kazi Shah Mofazzal Hossain Kaikobad	Bangladesh Nationalist Party
252	Cumilla-4	Hasnat Abdullah	National Citizen Party
253	Cumilla-5	Md. Jashim Uddin	Bangladesh Nationalist Party
254	Cumilla-6	Monirul Haq Chowdhury	Bangladesh Nationalist Party
255	Cumilla-7	Atikul Alam Shawon	Independent politician
256	Cumilla-8	Zakaria Taher Sumon	Bangladesh Nationalist Party
257	Cumilla-9	Md. Abul Kalam	Bangladesh Nationalist Party
258	Cumilla-10	Md. Mobasher Alam Bhuiyan	Bangladesh Nationalist Party
259	Cumilla-11	Syed Abdullah Muhammad Taher	Bangladesh Jamaat-e-Islami
260	Chandpur-1	A. N. M. Ehsanul Hoque Milan	Bangladesh Nationalist Party
261	Chandpur-2	Md. Jalal Uddin	Bangladesh Nationalist Party
262	Chandpur-3	Sheikh Farid Ahmed Manik	Bangladesh Nationalist Party
263	Chandpur-4	Md. Abdul Hannan	Independent politician
264	Chandpur-5	Md. Mominul Haque	Bangladesh Nationalist Party
265	Feni-1	Munshi Rafiqul Alam	Bangladesh Nationalist Party
266	Feni-2	Joynal Abedin	Bangladesh Nationalist Party
267	Feni-3	Abdul Awal Mintoo	Bangladesh Nationalist Party
268	Noakhali-1	Mahbub Uddin Khokon	Bangladesh Nationalist Party
269	Noakhali-2	Zainul Abdin Farroque	Bangladesh Nationalist Party
270	Noakhali-3	Barkat Ullah Bulu	Bangladesh Nationalist Party
271	Noakhali-4	Md. Shahjahan	Bangladesh Nationalist Party
272	Noakhali-5	Muhammad Fakrul Islam	Bangladesh Nationalist Party
273	Noakhali-6	Abdul Hannan Masud	National Citizen Party
274	Lakshmipur-1	Shahadat Hossain Salim	Bangladesh Nationalist Party
275	Lakshmipur-2	Abul Khair Bhuiyan	Bangladesh Nationalist Party
276	Lakshmipur-3	Shahid Uddin Chowdhury Anee	Bangladesh Nationalist Party
277	Lakshmipur-4	A. B. M. Ashraf Uddin	Bangladesh Nationalist Party
278	Chattogram-1	Nurul Amin	Bangladesh Nationalist Party
279	Chattogram-2	Sarowar Alamgir	Bangladesh Nationalist Party
280	Chattogram-3	Mostafa Kamal Pasha	Bangladesh Nationalist Party
281	Chattogram-4	Vacant (Note: Bangladesh Election Commission postponed the results.)	Bangladesh Nationalist Party
282	Chattogram-5	Mir Mohammad Helal Uddin	Bangladesh Nationalist Party
283	Chattogram-6	Giasuddin Quader Chowdhury	Bangladesh Nationalist Party
284	Chattogram-7	Humam Quader Chowdhury	Bangladesh Nationalist Party
285	Chattogram-8	Ershad Ullah	Bangladesh Nationalist Party
286	Chattogram-9	Mohammad Abu Sufian	Bangladesh Nationalist Party
287	Chattogram-10	Sayeed Al Noman	Bangladesh Nationalist Party
288	Chattogram-11	Amir Khasru Mahmud Chowdhury	Bangladesh Nationalist Party
289	Chattogram-12	Enamul Haque Enam	Bangladesh Nationalist Party
290	Chattogram-13	Sarwar Jamal Nizam	Bangladesh Nationalist Party
291	Chattogram-14	Jashim Uddin Ahammed	Bangladesh Nationalist Party
292	Chattogram-15	Shajahan Chowdhury	Bangladesh Jamaat-e-Islami
293	Chattogram-16	Mohammad Zahirul Islam	Bangladesh Jamaat-e-Islami
294	Cox's Bazar-1	Salahuddin Ahmed	Bangladesh Nationalist Party
295	Cox's Bazar-2	Alamgir Mohammad Mahfuzullah Farid	Bangladesh Nationalist Party
296	Cox's Bazar-3	Lutfur Rahman Kajal	Bangladesh Nationalist Party
297	Cox's Bazar-4	Shahjahan Chowdhury	Bangladesh Nationalist Party
298	Khagrachhari	Wadud Bhuiyan	Bangladesh Nationalist Party
299	Rangamati	Dipen Dewan	Bangladesh Nationalist Party
300	Bandarban	Sa Ching Prue Jerry	Bangladesh Nationalist Party

=== Reserved women seats ===
No.	Constituency	Name	Party
301	Women's Seat-1	Selima Rahman	Bangladesh Nationalist Party
302	Women's Seat-2	Shirin Sultana	Bangladesh Nationalist Party
303	Women's Seat-3	Rasheda Begum Hira	Bangladesh Nationalist Party
304	Women's Seat-4	Rehana Akter Ranu	Bangladesh Nationalist Party
305	Women's Seat-5	Newaz Halima Arli	Bangladesh Nationalist Party
306	Women's Seat-6	Farida Yasmin	Bangladesh Nationalist Party
307	Women's Seat-7	Bilkis Islam	Bangladesh Nationalist Party
308	Women's Seat-8	Shakila Farzana	Bangladesh Nationalist Party
309	Women's Seat-9	Helen Zerin Khan	Bangladesh Nationalist Party
310	Women's Seat-10	Nilufar Chowdhury Moni	Bangladesh Nationalist Party
311	Women's Seat-11	Nipun Roy Chowdhury	Bangladesh Nationalist Party
312	Women's Seat-12	Zeeba Amina Khan	Bangladesh Nationalist Party
313	Women's Seat-13	Mahmuda Habiba	Bangladesh Nationalist Party
314	Women's Seat-14	Mst Sabira Sultana	Bangladesh Nationalist Party
315	Women's Seat-15	Sunsila Jabrin	Bangladesh Nationalist Party
316	Women's Seat-16	Sanjida Islam Tulee	Bangladesh Nationalist Party
317	Women's Seat-17	Sultana Ahmed	Bangladesh Nationalist Party
318	Women's Seat-18	Fahmida Haque	Bangladesh Nationalist Party
319	Women's Seat-19	Asha Minaz	Bangladesh Nationalist Party
320	Women's Seat-20	Suborna Sikder Thakur	Bangladesh Nationalist Party
321	Women's Seat-21	Shamim Ara Begum Swapna	Bangladesh Nationalist Party
322	Women's Seat-22	Shammi Akter	Bangladesh Nationalist Party
323	Women's Seat-23	Ferdousi Ahmed	Bangladesh Nationalist Party
324	Women's Seat-24	Bithika Binte Hossain	Bangladesh Nationalist Party
325	Women's Seat-25	Suraiya Jerin	Bangladesh Nationalist Party
326	Women's Seat-26	Mansura Akter	Bangladesh Nationalist Party
327	Women's Seat-27	Jahrat Adib Chowdhury	Bangladesh Nationalist Party
328	Women's Seat-28	Momtaz Alo	Bangladesh Nationalist Party
329	Women's Seat-29	Fahima Nasrin	Bangladesh Nationalist Party
330	Women's Seat-30	Arifa Sultana	Bangladesh Nationalist Party
331	Women's Seat-31	Sanjida Yeasmin	Bangladesh Nationalist Party
332	Women's Seat-32	Nadia Pathan Papon	Bangladesh Nationalist Party
333	Women's Seat-33	Shawkat Ara Akter	Bangladesh Nationalist Party
334	Women's Seat-34	Madhabi Marma	Bangladesh Nationalist Party
335	Women's Seat-35	Selina Sultana	Bangladesh Nationalist Party
336	Women's Seat-36	Rebecca Sultana	Bangladesh Nationalist Party
337	Women's Seat-37	Nurunnisa Siddika	Bangladesh Jamaat-e-Islami
338	Women's Seat-38	Marzia Begum	Bangladesh Jamaat-e-Islami
339	Women's Seat-39	Sabikun Nahar Munni	Bangladesh Jamaat-e-Islami
340	Women's Seat-40	Nazmun Nahar Neelu	Bangladesh Jamaat-e-Islami
341	Women's Seat-41	Mahfuza Hannan	Bangladesh Jamaat-e-Islami
342	Women's Seat-42	Sajeda Samad	Bangladesh Jamaat-e-Islami
343	Women's Seat-43	Shamchunnahar Begum	Bangladesh Jamaat-e-Islami
344	Women's Seat-44	Mardia Mumtaz	Bangladesh Jamaat-e-Islami
345	Women's Seat-45	Rokeya Begum	Bangladesh Jamaat-e-Islami
346	Women's Seat-46	Mahmuda Alam Mitu	National Citizen Party
347	Women's Seat-47	Nusrat Tabassum	National Citizen Party
348	Women's Seat-48	Tasmia Pradhan	Jatiya Ganotantrik Party
349	Women's Seat-49	Mahbuba Hakim	Bangladesh Khelafat Majlis
350	Women's Seat-50	Sultana Jasmine	Independent politician

== See also ==
- Judiciary of Bangladesh
- Supreme Court of Bangladesh
- Senate of Bangladesh, proposed upper house
