= Subikunnahar =

Bangladeshi politician

- সাবিকুন্নাহার

Member of the Bangladesh Parliament for Reserved women seat
- Incumbent
- Assumed office 3 May 2026
- Prime Minister: Tarique Rahman

Personal details
- Born: 1 January 1973 (age 53) Dhaka
- Party: Bangladesh Jamaat-e-Islami
- Parents: Md. Abu Sayed (father); Rowshan Sayeed (mother)
- Education: University of Dhaka; Begum Badrunnesa Government Girls' College

Sabikunnahar (also known as Sabikun Nahar Munni) is a Bangladeshi politician of the Bangladesh Jamaat-e-Islami. She is currently serving as a Member of Parliament from reserved women seats.

== Early life ==
Sabikunnahar was born on 1 January 1973 to Md. Abu Sayed and Rowshan Sayeed in Dhaka.

== Education ==
Subikunnahar completed her HSC at Begum Badrunnesa Government Girls' College. Then she completed her BSC and MSC at the University of Dhaka.

== Career ==
Sabikunnahar served as the central president of Bangladesh Islami Chhatri Sangstha. She is currently serving as secretary of the women's wing of the Bangladesh Lawyers' Council. She is also serving as the secretary of the law and human resources department of Bangladesh Jamaat-e-Islami.
