= Rokeya Begum (Dhaka politician) =

Bangladeshi politician and Member of Parliament

- রোকেয়া বেগম

Member of Parliament
- Incumbent
- Assumed office 30 April 2026
- Preceded by: Nachima Zaman Bobby
- Constituency: Reserved Seat-45

Personal details
- Born: 1977 (age 48–49) Dhaka, Bangladesh
- Party: Bangladesh Jamaat-e-Islami
- Spouse: Kabir Hossain
- Children: 2
- Education: Eden Mohila College
- Occupation: Retired schoolteacher

Rokeya Begum (born 1977) is a Bangladeshi politician, retired schoolteacher and a member of 13th Jatiya Sangsad from a reserved women's seat, nominated by Bangladesh Jamaat-e-Islami. She is widely known as the mother of July massacre martyr child Jabir Ibrahim.

== Early life and education ==
She was born in 1977 and worked as a school teacher before taking retirement. Begum completed her primary and secondary education at Khilgaon Government High School. Later she completed her Higher Secondary Certificate from Siddheswari Girls' College. She earned both her bachelor's and master's degrees from Eden Mohila College.

== Career ==
She was a retired school teacher.

=== Political career ===
In 2026, Bangladesh Jamaat-e-Islami nominated Rokeya Begum for a reserved women's seat in 13th Jatiya Sangsad.

== Personal life ==
Rokeya Begum is married to Kabir Hossain, who works for a mobile phone sales company. They have three children. Her son Jabir Ibrahim, was a student of KC Model School and College. During the July Uprising, he joined the Long March in Uttara on 5 August 2024. He was shot and injured by police of Uttara East Police Station and later died at Bangladesh–Kuwait Maitree Government Hospital.
