= Mansura Akter =

Bangladeshi politician

- মানসুরা আক্তার

Member of Parliament
- Incumbent
- Assumed office 12 May 2026
- Preceded by: Sabera Begum
- Constituency: Reserved Women's Seat-26

Personal details
- Born: 21 September 1994 (age 32) Purbadhala Upazila, Netrokona District, Bangladesh
- Party: Bangladesh Nationalist Party
- Education: University of Dhaka
- Occupation: Politician

Mansura Akter (also known as Mansura Alam) is a Bangladeshi politician who was elected as a member of parliament for the Reserved Women's seat-26 as a candidate of the Bangladesh Nationalist Party for the 13th Jatiya Sangsad for the first time. She is the youngest candidate for the women's reserved seat of the BNP.

She is currently serving as the joint general secretary of the central committee of Bangladesh Jatiotabadi Chatra Dal.

== Early life ==
Akter was born in Purbadhala Upazila, located in the Netrokona District of Bangladesh. She was a law student at the University of Dhaka during the 2012–2013 academic session, completing her bachelor's degrees there. She worked as the university correspondent for the newspaper Jaijaidin.

== See also ==
- List of members of the 13th Jatiya Sangsad
