= Mardia Mumtaz =

Bangladeshi politician and Member of Parliament

- মারদিয়া মুমতাজ

Member of Parliament
- Incumbent
- Assumed office 30 April 2026
- Preceded by: Ashrafun Nesha
- Constituency: Reserved Seat-44

Personal details
- Party: Bangladesh Jamaat-e-Islami
- Spouse: Mohammad Abul Kashem (m. 2010)
- Education: Bangladesh University of Engineering & Technology
- Occupation: Politician, engineer
- Website: www.mardiamumtaz.com

Mardia Mumtaz is a Bangladeshi teacher and politician who is a Member of Parliament (MP) from the reserved women's seat of the 13th Jatiya Sangsad. She was nominated from the Bangladesh Jamaat-e-Islami.

== Career ==
Born in Chattogram, Mumtaz received her early education at Ideal School and College and Viqarunnisa Noon School and College in Dhaka. She earned both her bachelor's and master's degrees in civil engineering from the Bangladesh University of Engineering and Technology. She has been working as a lecturer in the Department of civil engineering at Daffodil International University since August 2017. She previously worked as a Structural Design Consultant at Megacity Builders and also served as a Structural and Seismic Fitness Auditor.

Her research and teaching areas include structural analysis, building construction, geotechnical engineering, transportation engineering, and water resources engineering. In addition, her research interests include bridge modeling, concrete properties, and RCC (Reinforced Cement Concrete) buildings.

== Political career ==
Mumtaz became involved with the Islami Chhatri Sangstha from an early age and served as president of its Bangladesh University of Engineering and Technology unit until 2012. After completing her studies in 2013, she joined Bangladesh Jamaat-e-Islami and became a Rukn of the party in 2017. She has since held various organizational responsibilities, including positions in the IT and Engineering departments of the party's Dhaka metropolitan unit.

A report published in the Daily Naya Diganta stated that she previously served as a member of the central committee of women's rights organisation.

In April 2026, she was nominated by Bangladesh Jamaat-e-Islami for a reserved women's seat in the 13th Jatiya Sangsad.

== Published works ==
=== Books ===
- আল মুহাদ্দিসাত [Al-Muḥaddithāt] (in Bengali). Guardian Publications. 2022. ISBN 9789849675488.
  - Bengali translation of Al-Muḥaddithāt by Akram Nadwi.
- রিভাইভ ইয়োর হার্ট [Revive Your Heart] (in Bengali). Guardian Publications. 2023. ISBN 9789848254400.
  - Bengali translation of Revive Your Heart by Nouman Ali Khan.
- খুন ভেজা জমিন (in Bengali). Boitoi. 2025.
- বরষার ঘোর (in Bengali). Boitoi. 2025.
- আড়ালে (in Bengali). Boitoi. 2025.
- কে তুমি? (in Bengali). Boitoi. 2025.
- ইচ্ছে-দিনের আলোছায়া (in Bengali). Boitoi. 2025.
- অদৃশ্য বইয়ের অক্ষরে (in Bengali). Boitoi. 2025.
- অদ্বিতীয়া (in Bengali). Boitoi. 2025.
- কিসওয়ার ছায়ায় (in Bengali). Boitoi. 2025.
- রঙকাব্য (in Bengali). Boitoi. 2025.
- কালোগল্প (in Bengali). Boitoi. 2025.
- নোঙর (in Bengali). Boitoi. 2025.

=== Anthologies ===
- The Amateur Pen, Volume 1. Binirman Academy. 2026. ISBN 9789843588203.

== Personal life ==
Mumtaz is a resident of the Paikpara area in Brahmanbaria District. Her father is Mumtazul Karim, who is an engineer.
