= Rehana Akter Ranu =

Bangladeshi politician

- রেহানা আক্তার রানু

Member of Parliament
- Incumbent
- Assumed office 3 May 2026
- Preceded by: Nachima Zaman Bobby
- Constituency: Women's Reserved Seat-4
- In office 19 March 2009 – 24 January 2014
- Preceded by: Rasheda Begum Hira
- Succeeded by: Lutfa Taher
- Constituency: Women's Reserved Seat-40
- In office 2 September 2005 – 27 October 2006
- Preceded by: Sagufta Yasmin Emily
- Succeeded by: Momtaz Begum
- Constituency: Women's Reserved Seat-21

Personal details
- Born: 1 January 1970 (age 56) Feni, East Pakistan, Pakistan
- Party: Bangladesh Nationalist Party

Rehana Akter Ranu is a Bangladesh Nationalist Party politician and a three-term Jatiya Sangsad member from women's reserved seats.

== Career ==
Ranu was elected to parliament from a reserved seat as a Bangladesh Nationalist Party candidate in 2001 and again in 2009.
