= Ferdousi Ahmed Mishti =

Bangladeshi politician

- ফেরদৌসী আহমেদ মিষ্টি

Member of the Jatiya Sangsad
- In office 3 May 2026 – 1 October 2026
- Constituency: Reserved Women's Seat-23

Personal details
- Party: Bangladesh Nationalist Party
- Spouse: Saidur Rahman Newton (died 2002)
- Relatives: Nasiruddin Ahmed Pintu (brother)
- Education: Begum Badrunnesa Government Girls' College

Ferdousi Ahmed Mishti (Bengali: ফেরদৌসী আহমেদ মিষ্টি) is a Bangladeshi politician of the Bangladesh Nationalist Party (BNP) who was a member of the 13th Jatiya Sangsad for a reserved women's seat in 2026. A former ward councillor in Dhaka and a joint convener of the party's Dhaka North unit, she resigned from parliament after five months in office when her name was raised in connection with an attack on a health centre in Mirpur.

== Early life and local politics ==
Mishti studied at Begum Badrunnessa Government Women's College in Dhaka, where she was active in student politics. She is a sister of Nasiruddin Ahmed Pintu, a BNP leader and former member of parliament for Dhaka-6.

Her husband, Saidur Rahman Newton, was a BNP activist and councillor for Ward 8 of the Dhaka City Corporation until his death in 2002; Mishti was elected to the seat after he died. She was serving as commissioner for Ward 8, in the Shah Ali area of Mirpur, in 2006. She later became a joint convener of the BNP's Dhaka North city unit and remained active in politics in Mirpur.

== Member of parliament ==
The BNP nominated Mishti for one of the 49 reserved women's seats in the thirteenth parliament, which are allocated to parties in proportion to the seats they win at a general election. A gazette notification of her election was published on 30 April 2026, and she took the oath of office as member for Reserved Women's Seat-23 on 3 May, when Speaker Hafiz Uddin Ahmad administered the oath to 49 women members.

== Radda centre attack and resignation ==
Around midnight on 24 September 2026, a crowd attacked, looted and demolished the Radda MCH-FP Centre, a maternal and child health facility in Mirpur-1 that had operated since 1976. The attack followed a long-running dispute over control of the plot on which the centre stood.

Home minister Salahuddin Ahmed said that the name of a local member of parliament had appeared in an intelligence report on the incident. Mishti denied any involvement, and said she had no current association with the shopkeepers' cooperative society that was party to the land dispute.

Prime minister and BNP chairman Tarique Rahman instructed Mishti to resign. On 1 October 2026 she submitted a letter of resignation to the Speaker, writing that she had decided "in full consciousness and voluntarily to resign from the post of Member of Parliament (reserved women's seat-23)"; the letter gave no reason for her departure. Asked by reporters about the resignation, she said, "Let there be an investigation." The Parliament Secretariat accepted the resignation and issued a gazette notification declaring the seat vacant.
