= Sanjida Islam Tulee =

Bangladeshi politician

Sanjida Islam
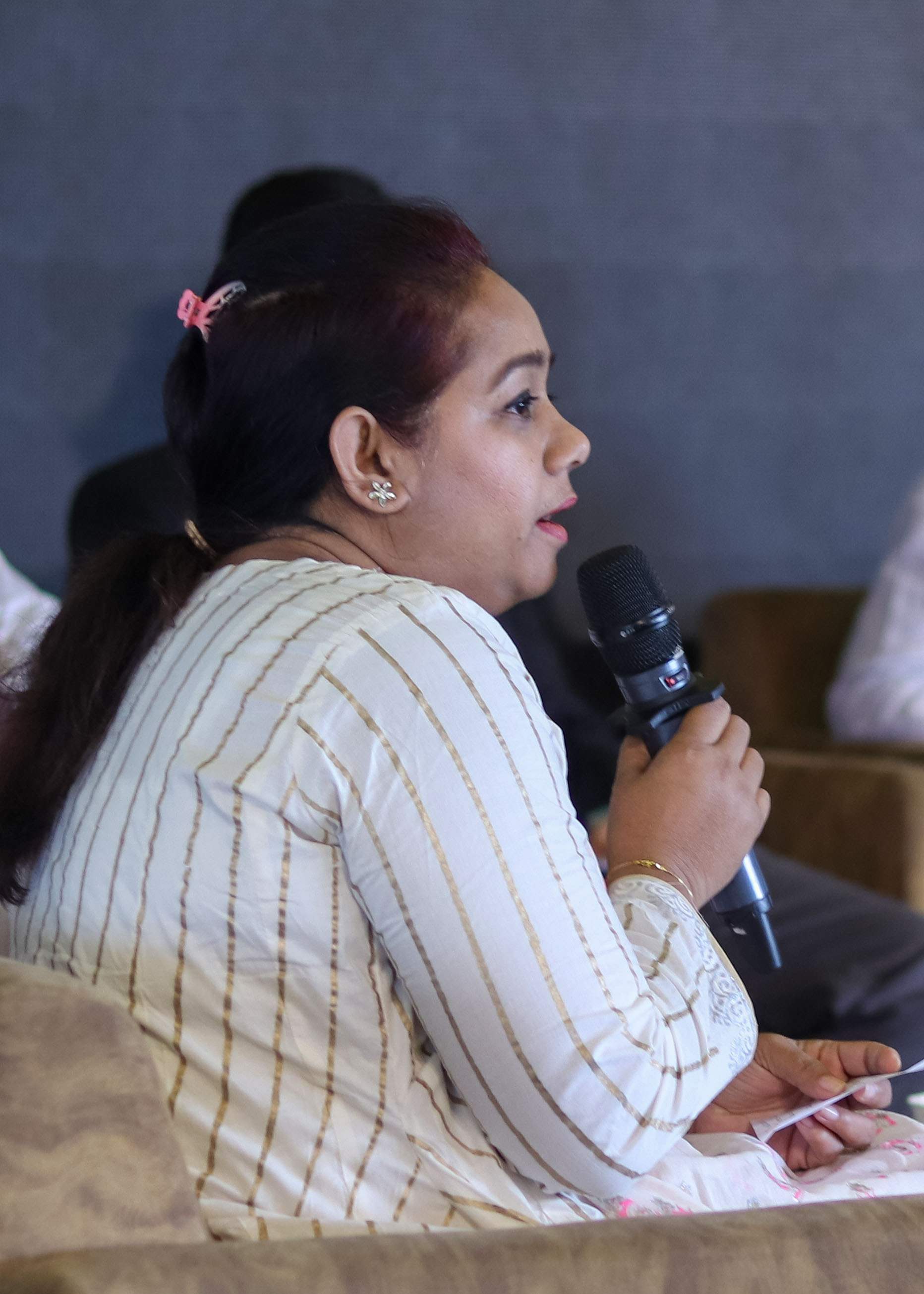
- Sanjida Islam in 2024

Member of Parliament
- Incumbent
- Assumed office 3 May 2026
- Preceded by: Khaleda Bahar Beauty
- Constituency: Reserved Seat 16

Personal details
- Born: 8 March 1983 (age 43)
- Party: Bangladesh Nationalist Party
- Education: Bangladesh University of Textiles
- Nickname: Tulee

Sanjida Islam is a Bangladeshi politician and human rights activist. She is a current member of parliament from a reserved women's seat.

== Early life and education ==
Sanjida Islam passed both the Higher Secondary and Secondary examinations from BAF Shaheen College Dhaka. Then she obtained a Bachelor of Science degree in Textile Engineering from Bangladesh University of Textiles.

== Political career ==
In 2026, she contested in the 13th Jatiya Sangsad election from the Dhaka-14 constituency but was defeated. Later that year, she was nominated by Bangladesh Nationalist Party for a reserved women's seat in the 13th Jatiya Sangsad.
