= Mahbuba Hakim =

Bangladeshi politician and Member of Parliament

- মাহবুবা হাকিম

Member of Parliament
- Incumbent
- Assumed office 30 April 2026
- Preceded by: Salma Islam
- Constituency: Reserved Seat-49

Personal details
- Born: 1984 (age 41–42) Savar, Dhaka, Bangladesh
- Party: Bangladesh Khelafat Majlis
- Spouse: Awlad Hossain
- Children: 2
- Education: Bangladesh University of Textiles
- Occupation: Politician, engineer

Mahbuba Hakim (Bengali: মাহবুবা হাকিম; born 1984) is a Bangladeshi engineer and politician. She is a member of parliament nominated by Bangladesh Khelafat Majlis from a reserved women's seat in the 13th Jatiya Sangsad as part of the 11 party alliance. She is also a member of the women's wing of Bangladesh Khelafat Majlis.

== Early life and education ==
She was born in 1984 in Savar, Dhaka. Her father was the late Abdul Hakim and her mother is Mahmuda Sultana. She completed her Secondary School Certificate (SSC) from Savar Cantonment Public School and College in 1999 and her Higher Secondary Certificate (HSC) from the same institution in 2001. She later earned a bachelor's degree in textile engineering from Bangladesh University of Textiles (BUTEX).

== Career ==
Hakim has worked in several organizations in Bangladesh's textile sector, including Textile Birds Group, Anlima Textile Limited and Far East Knitting and Dyeing Industries Limited. She has experience in laboratory management and quality control. She is currently involved in religious education activities. In addition to managing Hifz and Maktab institutions, she is active in child education and various social development programs in the Paltan area of Dhaka.

She was nominated for a reserved women's seat in the 13th Jatiya Sangsad by the 11-party alliance led by Jamaat-e-Islami. She is a member of the women's wing of Bangladesh Khelafat Majlis.

== Personal life ==
Mahbuba Hakim is married to Aulad Hossain, a physician and teacher who specializes in medicine and gastroenterology. The couple has one child.
