= Rokeya Sultana =

Bangladeshi politician (born 1952)

- রোকেয়া সুলতানা
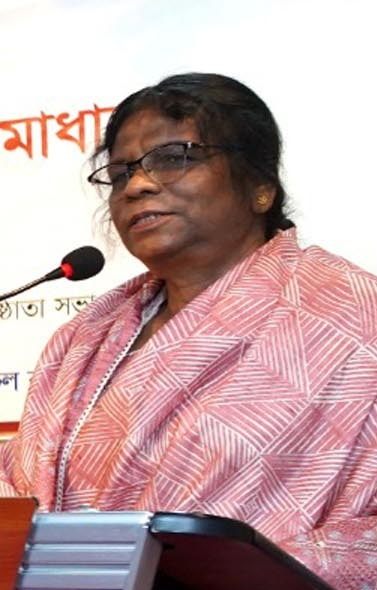
- Rokeya in 2024

State Minister of Health and Family Welfare
- In office 11 January 2024 – 6 August 2024
- Minister: Samanta Lal Sen
- Preceded by: Zahid Maleque

Member of the Bangladesh Parliament for Reserved Women's Seat–5
- In office 28 February 2024 – 6 August 2024
- Preceded by: Gloria Jharna Sarker
- Succeeded by: Newaz Halima Arli

Personal details
- Born: 14 July 1952 (age 74) Joypurhat, East Bengal, Dominion of Pakistan
- Party: Awami League
- Education: Rangpur Medical College

Rokeya Sultana is an Awami League politician and a former Jatiya Sangsad member on a women's reserved seat for Joypurhat District. She is a former Minister of State in the Ministry of Health and Family Welfare.
