= Nurun Nesa Siddiqua =

Bangladeshi politician

- নুরুন্নেসা সিদ্দিকা

Member of the Bangladesh Parliament for Reserved women seat
- Incumbent
- Assumed office 3 May 2026
- Prime Minister: Tarique Rahman

Personal details
- Born: 1958 (age 67–68) Char Kakra village, Companiganj Upazila, Noakhali District
- Party: Bangladesh Jamaat-e-Islami
- Spouse: Sheikh Mohammad Mohiuddin
- Parents: Noman Siddiqui (father); Hasmatunnesa (mother)
- Education: Eden Mohila College; Azimpur Government Girls' School and College

Nurun Nesa Siddiqua is a Bangladeshi politician of the Bangladesh Jamaat-e-Islami. She is currently serving as a Member of Parliament from reserved women seats.

== Early life ==
Siddiqua was born on 1958 to Noman Siddiqui and Hasmatunnesa in Char Kakra village of Companiganj Upazila under Noakhali District. She married to Sheikh Mohammad Mohiuddin, a retired professor of Tejgaon College.

== Education ==
Siddiqua studied up to class eight at Peshkarhat High School. Then she completed her secondary education at Azimpur Government Girls' School and College and higher secondary education at Eden Mohila College. She completed her bachelor's and master's degrees in Bangla.

== Career ==
Siddiqua is a founding member of Bangladesh Islami Chhatri Sangstha and served as the organisation's second central president. She joined Jamaat's women's wing in 1990 and later served as the secretary of the organisation.
