= Hazera Khatun =

Bangladeshi politician

Member of 11th Jatiya Sangsad of Reserved Seats for Women - 39
- In office 9 January 2014 – 29 October 2018
- Preceded by: Rasheda Begum Hira
- Succeeded by: Parveen Haque Sikder

Personal details
- Born: 31 July 1947 (age 77)
- Political party: Workers Party of Bangladesh

Hazera Khatun (born 31 July 1947) is a Bangladeshi politician. She served as a member of the Jatiyo Sangshad from 2014 through 2018. She held one of the 50 reserved seats for women and represented the Workers Party of Bangladesh.

== Background ==
Khatun is a civil servant by profession.
