= Sultana Jasmine =

Bangladeshi politician and Member of Parliament

Sultana Jesmine
- সুলতানা জেসমিন

Member of Parliament
- Incumbent
- Assumed office 30 April 2026
- Preceded by: Nurunnahar Begum
- Constituency: Reserved Seat-49

Personal details
- Party: Independent
- Occupation: Politician

Sultana Jasmine Jui is a Bangladeshi politician. She is an independent member of parliament nominated from Reserved Women's Seat-49 in 13th Jatiya Sangsad (National Parliament). She is a former Vice President of the central committee of Jatiyatabadi Chhatra Dal, student wing of Bangladesh Nationalist Party (BNP). She currently serves as a member of BNP's central committee.

== Career ==
Jui was born in Buichakathi village of Shekhmatia Union in Nazirpur Upazila, Pirojpur District. Her father's name is Abdul Aziz Hawlader. She earned a bachelor's degree in Islamic Studies from University of Dhaka. She also completed a master's degree in Project Management from a university in China.

== Political career ==
She served as a member, assistant general secretary and vice president of the central executive committee of Jatiyatabadi Chhatra Dal. From 2022 to 2024, she served as the convener of the Zia Memorial Library. She is currently a member of the central committee of the Bangladesh Nationalist Party (BNP).
