= Md. Enamul Haque (politician) =

Bangladeshi politician (born 1964)

- মোঃ এনামুল হক

Member of the Bangladesh Parliament for Naogaon-2
- Incumbent
- Assumed office 17 February 2026
- Preceded by: Shahiduzzaman Sarker

Personal details
- Born: 16 April 1964 (age 62) Dhamoirhat Upazila, Naogaon District, East Pakistan
- Citizenship: Bangladesh
- Party: Bangladesh Jamaat-e-Islami
- Occupation: Engineer and politician

Md. Enamul Haque (born 16 April 1964) is a Bangladeshi engineer and politician who was elected as a Member of Parliament for the Naogaon-2 constituency as a candidate of the Bangladesh Jamaat-e-Islami in the 2026 Bangladeshi general election for the first time.

== See also ==
- List of members of the 13th Jatiya Sangsad
