= Nazmun Nahar Nilu =

Bangladeshi politician

- নাজমুন নাহার নীলু

Member of the Bangladesh Parliament for Reserved women seat
- Incumbent
- Assumed office 3 May 2026
- Prime Minister: Tarique Rahman

Personal details
- Born: 3 December 1970 (age 55)
- Party: Bangladesh Jamaat-e-Islami
- Education: University of Dhaka; Tejgaon College

Nazmun Nahar Nilu is a Bangladeshi politician of the Bangladesh Jamaat-e-Islami. She is currently serving as a Member of Parliament from reserved women seats.

== Early life ==
Nilu was born on 3 December 1970 to G. M. Azizul Haque and Zebunnesa.

== Career ==
Nilu served as the central president of Bangladesh Islami Chhatri Sangstha. She is currently serving as secretary of publicity and cultural affairs of Bangladesh Jamaat-e-Islami.
