= Sultana Ahmed =

Bangladeshi politician

Member of Parliament
- In office 2005–2006

Personal details
- Born: Barisal, Bangladesh
- Party: Bangladesh Nationalist Party

Sultana Ahmed is a Bangladesh Nationalist Party politician and a former member of the Bangladesh Parliament from a reserved seat. She is also general secretary of Bangladesh Jatiotabadi Mohila Dal.

== Career ==
Ahmed was elected to parliament from a reserved seat as a Bangladesh Nationalist Party candidate in 2005. She is the general secretary of Jatiyatabadi Mohila Dal.

In November 2022, Ahmed was detained under a Digital Security Act case filed over comments she had made about Prime Minister Sheikh Hasina. The case was filed by the president of the Gopalganj District unit of Bangladesh Chhatra League.

In 2026, she was again nominated by Bangladesh Nationalist Party for a reserved women's seat in the 13th Jatiya Sangsad.
