= Sanjida Yasmeen =

Bangladeshi politician

- সানজিদা ইয়াসমিন

Member of the Bangladesh Parliament for Reserved women seat
- Incumbent
- Assumed office 3 May 2026
- Prime Minister: Tarique Rahman

Personal details
- Born: 3 March 1989 (age 37) Sadipur, Lalpur Upazila, Natore District
- Party: Bangladesh Nationalist Party
- Parents: Md. Akter Hossain (father); Rabeya Begum (mother)
- Education: Eden Mohila College

Sanjida Yasmeen is a Bangladeshi politician of the Bangladesh Nationalist Party. She is currently serving as a Member of Parliament from reserved women seats.

== Early life ==
Yasmeen was born on 3 March 1989 to Mohammad Akter Hossain and Rabeya Begum in Sadipur village of Lalpur Upazila under Natore District.

== Career ==
Yasmeen served as the president of Eden Mohila College Chhatra Dal and Joint General Secretary of the central committee of the Bangladesh Jatiyatabadi Chhatra Dal.
