= Eliza Zaman =

Bangladeshi politician

- এলিজা জামান

Member of the Bangladesh Parliament for Reserved women seat
- Incumbent
- Assumed office 3 November 2026
- Prime Minister: Tarique Rahman

Personal details
- Born: Jujkhola, Pirojpur District
- Party: Bangladesh Nationalist Party
- Parent: Sardar Sultan Mahmud (father)

Eliza Zaman is a Bangladeshi politician of the Bangladesh Nationalist Party. She is currently serving as a Member of Parliament from reserved women seats.

== Early life ==
Zaman was born in jojkhola in Pirojpur District. Her father's name is Sardar Sultan Mahmud.

== Career ==
Zaman is a member of the BNP's central Executive Committee, joint convener of the Pirojpur district BNP and organising secretary of the central Bangladesh Nationalist Party for the Barishal division.
