= Arifa Sultana Ruma =

Bangladeshi politician

- আরিফা সুলতানা রুমা

Member of the Bangladesh Parliament for Reserved women seat
- Incumbent
- Assumed office 3 May 2026
- Prime Minister: Tarique Rahman

Personal details
- Born: 21 April 1979 (age 47) Chatmohar Upazila, Pabna District
- Party: Bangladesh Nationalist Party
- Parents: Md. Akkas Ali (father); Halima Begum (mother)
- Education: Eden Mohila College; University of Rajshahi

Arifa Sultana Ruma is a Bangladeshi politician of the Bangladesh Nationalist Party. She is currently serving as a Member of Parliament from reserved women seats.

== Early life ==
Arifa was born on 21 April 1979 to Md. Akkas Ali and Halima Begum in Chatmohar Upazila under Pabna District.

== Career ==
Arifa is a lawyer by profession. She was an assistant general secretary of the central committee of the Bangladesh Jatiyatabadi Chhatra Dal. She also served as the senior joint convener of Eden Mohila College Chhatra Dal and member of the Dhaka Metropolitan South BNP convening committee.
