= Suraia Zarin Rony =

Bangladeshi politician

- সুরাইয়া জেরিন রনি

Member of the Bangladesh Parliament for Reserved women seat
- Incumbent
- Assumed office 3 May 2026
- Prime Minister: Tarique Rahman

Personal details
- Born: 20 February 1985 (age 41) Gabtali Upazila, Bogura District
- Party: Bangladesh Nationalist Party

Suraia Zarin Rony is a Bangladeshi politician of the Bangladesh Nationalist Party. She is currently serving as a Member of Parliament from reserved women seats.

== Early life ==
Suraia was born on 20 February 1985 in Gabtali Upazila under Bogura District.

== Career ==
Suraia was a Vice Chairman of Gabtali Upazila. She also serves as the Joint General Secretary of the Women’s Party of Bogura District.
