= Momtaj Alo Ahmed =

Bangladeshi politician

- মমতাজ আলো আহমেদ

Member of the Bangladesh Parliament for Reserved women seat
- Incumbent
- Assumed office 3 May 2026
- Prime Minister: Tarique Rahman

Personal details
- Born: 6 June 1974 (age 52) Purba Rakhi village, Shilai union, Munshiganj Sadar Upazila, Munshiganj District
- Party: Bangladesh Nationalist Party
- Parents: Abdul Gani Bepari (father); Halima Khatun (mother)

Momtaj Alo Ahmed is a Bangladeshi politician of the Bangladesh Nationalist Party. She is currently serving as a Member of Parliament from reserved women seats.

== Early life ==
Momtaj was born on 6 June 1974 in Purba Rakhi village of Shilai union under Munshiganj Sadar Upazila to Abdul Gani Bepari and Halima Khatun.

== Career ==
Momtaj serves as international affairs secretary of the central committee of the Jatiyatabadi Mohila Dal and as president of the Mohila Dal in France.
