= Madhabi Marma =

Bangladeshi lawyer and politician

- মাধবী মারমা

Member of the Jatiya Sangsad
- Incumbent
- Assumed office 3 May 2026
- Constituency: Reserved women's seat

Personal details
- Party: Bangladesh Nationalist Party
- Occupation: Lawyer; politician

Madhabi Marma (Bengali: মাধবী মারমা) is a Bangladeshi lawyer and politician. She has served as a member of the 13th Jatiya Sangsad from a reserved women's seat since May 2026. A member of the Bangladesh Nationalist Party (BNP), she was declared elected unopposed by the Election Commission on 30 April 2026.

Marma is a member of the Marma community from Bandarban. Before entering parliament, she worked as a lawyer and served in legal, political and public organisations in Bandarban District.

== Legal and public career ==
Marma practised law in Bandarban. She served as an assistant public prosecutor in Bandarban from 2009 to 2015. She was appointed as a notary public in 2015.

In November 2024, Marma was appointed as a member of the Bandarban Hill District Council. At the time of her parliamentary nomination, she was serving as vice-president of the Bandarban District Judge Court Lawyers' Association. She was also vice-president of the Bandarban branch of the Corruption Prevention Committee and was involved in socio-cultural activities in the Chittagong Hill Tracts.

== Political career ==
Marma previously served as general secretary of the Bandarban district unit of the Jatiyatabadi Mahila Dal, the women's wing associated with the BNP.

In April 2026, the BNP nominated her for one of the seats reserved for women in the 13th Jatiya Sangsad. The Election Commission declared her and 48 other candidates elected unopposed after the number of valid candidates equalled the number of available seats. She took the oath of office on 3 May 2026 at the Jatiya Sangsad Bhaban.
