= Newaz Halima Arli =

Bangladeshi politician

- নেওয়াজ হালিমা আরলী

Member of the Bangladesh Parliament for Women's Reserved Seat-5
- Incumbent
- Assumed office 3 May 2026
- Preceded by: Rokeya Sultana

Member of the Bangladesh Parliament for Women's Reserved Seat-38
- In office 2 September 2005 – 27 October 2006
- Preceded by: Position created
- Succeeded by: Shammi Akter

Personal details
- Party: Bangladesh Nationalist Party

Newaz Halima Arli is a Bangladesh Nationalist Party politician and an incumbent Jatiya Sangsad member from a reserved women's seat since May 2026.

== Career ==
Arli was elected to parliament from reserved seat as a Bangladesh Nationalist Party candidate in September 2005. In 2026, she was again nominated by the party for a reserved women's seat in the 13th Jatiya Sangsad.
