= Jahrat Adib Chowdhury =

Bangladeshi politician

- জহরত আদিব চৌধুরী

Member of the Bangladesh Parliament for Women's Reserved Seat-27
- Incumbent
- Assumed office 3 May 2026
- Preceded by: not applicable

Personal details
- Spouse: Mohammad Zeeshan Hyder
- Parent: Ebadur Rahman Chowdhury (father)
- Education: Harvard Business School

Jahrat Adib Chowdhury is a Bangladeshi politician, a Barrister of Lincoln’s Inn, an Advocate of Supreme Court of Bangladesh and a former corporate executive. She is a Jatiya Sangsad member representing the Moulvibazar-Habiganj constituency from the Women's Reserved Seat-27 since May 2026 from Bangladesh Nationalist Party (BNP).

== Background ==
Jahrat Adib Chowdhury's father, Ebadur Rahman Chowdhury, was a State Minister for Food and Disaster Management during 2001–2003. She was one of the four sisters and grew up in Moulvibazar District. She is a graduate from Harvard Business School and became a barrister-at-law from Lincoln’s Inn.

== Career ==
Chowdhury joined Banglalink, a telecommunications company owned by Veon Group, in 2014; later became the Chief Legal Officer and Company Secretary, and then the Deputy-CEO of the company in April 2025.

== Political career ==
In 2026, she was nominated by Bangladesh Nationalist Party for a reserved women's seat in the 13th Jatiya Sangsad.

== Personal life ==
Chowdhury is married to Mohammad Zeeshan Hyder, a barrister and a deputy attorney general of Bangladesh Supreme Court. He was a son of Mohammad Hyder Ali, also a barrister, who served as a secretary of the government of Bangladesh and an adviser of the then prime minister Khaleda Zia. Chowdhury and Zeeshan have a son.
