= Shamsunnahar Begum =

Bangladeshi politician

- শামছুন্নাহার বেগম

Member of the Bangladesh Parliament for Reserved women seat
- Incumbent
- Assumed office 3 May 2026
- Prime Minister: Tarique Rahman

Personal details
- Born: 22 June 1973 (age 53) Chattogram District
- Party: Bangladesh Jamaat-e-Islami
- Parents: Jamal Ahmed (father); Sakina Khanam (mother)

Shamsunnahar Begum is a Bangladeshi politician of the Bangladesh Jamaat-e-Islami. She is currently serving as a Member of Parliament from reserved women seats.

== Early life ==
Begum was born on 22 June 1973 to Jamal Ahmed and Sakina Khanam in Chattogram District.

== Career ==
Begum served as the secretary of the Chattogram North district women’s wings of Bangladesh Jamaat-e-Islami.
