= Marzia Begum =

Bangladeshi politician

- মারজিয়া বেগম

Member of the Bangladesh Parliament for Reserved women seat
- Incumbent
- Assumed office 3 May 2026
- Prime Minister: Tarique Rahman

Personal details
- Born: 10 November 1957 (age 69) Nakla Upazila, Sherpur District
- Party: Bangladesh Jamaat-e-Islami
- Spouse: Dr Foyez Ahmed
- Parents: Nurur Rahman (father); Tahamina Begum (mother)
- Education: Eden Mohila College

Marzia Begum is a Bangladeshi politician of the Bangladesh Jamaat-e-Islami. She is currently serving as a Member of Parliament from reserved women seats.

== Early life ==
Begum was born on 10 November 1957 to Nurur Rahman and Tahamina Begum in Nakla Upazila under Sherpur District. She married to Dr Foyez Ahmed in 1980, amir of Bangladesh Jamaat-e-Islami, Lakshmipur District.

== Education ==
Begum completed a bachelor's degree in psychology at Eden Mohila College.

== Career ==
Begum served as central organising and publicity secretary of Bangladesh Islami Chhatri Sangstha. Later she served as central assistant secretary in Jamaat's women's wing.
