= Nadia Pathan Papon =

Bangladeshi politician

- নাদিয়া পাঠান পাপন

Member of the Bangladesh Parliament for Reserved women seat
- Incumbent
- Assumed office 3 May 2026
- Prime Minister: Tarique Rahman

Personal details
- Born: 31 July 1984 (age 42) Chandura, Bijoynagar Upazila, Brahmanbaria District
- Party: Bangladesh Nationalist Party
- Parents: Anwar Hossain (father); Syeda Nakhlu Akter (mother)
- Education: Begum Badrunnesa Government Girls' College

Nadia Pathan Papon is a Bangladeshi politician of the Bangladesh Nationalist Party. She is currently serving as a Member of Parliament from reserved women seats.

== Early life ==
Papon was born on 31 July 1984 to Anwar Hossain and Syeda Nakhlu Akter in Chandura village of Bijoynagar Upazila under Brahmanbaria District.

== Education ==
Papon passed her SSC from Daudpur High School and HSC from Kazi Mohammad Shafiqul Islam College. Then she graduated from Begum Badrunnesa Government Girls' College in Dhaka.

== Career ==
Papon served as the general secretary of the Begum Badrunnesa Government Girls' College Chhatra Dal. She also served as assistant organizing secretary, assistantt student affairs secretary of the central executive committee Bangladesh Jatiyatabadi Chhatra Dal.She is now a member of the convening committee of the BNP's Dhaka South city unit.
