= Golam Rasul =

Bangladeshi Member of Parliament

Member of the Bangladesh Parliament for Jessore-4
- Incumbent
- Assumed office 12 February 2026

Personal details
- Party: Bangladesh Jamaat-e-Islami

Golam Rasul is an Bangladesh Jamaat-e-Islami politician and Member of Parliament (Bangladesh) representing the Jessore-4 constituency.
