= Rezeka Sultana Fancy =

Bangladeshi politician

- রেজেকা সুলতানা ফেন্সী

Member of the Bangladesh Parliament for Reserved women seat
- Incumbent
- Assumed office 3 May 2026
- Prime Minister: Tarique Rahman

Personal details
- Born: 1 March 1958 (age 68) Keranipara, Rangpur Sadar, Rangpur
- Party: Bangladesh Nationalist Party
- Parents: K. A. Kuddus (father); Fatema Zohra (mother)
- Education: Carmichael College

Rezeka Sultana Fancy is a Bangladeshi politician of the Bangladesh Nationalist Party. She is currently serving as a Member of Parliament from reserved women seats.

== Early life ==
Fancy was born on 1 March 1958 to K. A. Kuddus and Fatema Zohra in Keranipara of Rangpur Sadar under Rangpur.

== Career ==
Fancy is the president of the Rangpur Metropolitan's Nationalist Women's Party, the co-organizing secretary of the Central Women's Party and the vice-president of the Nationalist Lawyers Forum.
