= Fahima Nasrin =

Bangladeshi politician

- ফাহিমা নাসরিন

Member of the Bangladesh Parliament for Reserved women seat
- Incumbent
- Assumed office 3 May 2026
- Prime Minister: Tarique Rahman

Personal details
- Born: 25 December 1963 (age 62)
- Party: Bangladesh Nationalist Party
- Spouse: Ali Askar Qureshi
- Parents: Abul Hashem Mia (father); Rabeya Khatun (mother)
- Education: University of Dhaka; Begum Badrunnesa Government Girls' College

Fahima Nasrin is a Bangladeshi politician of the Bangladesh Nationalist Party. She is currently serving as a Member of Parliament from reserved women seats.

== Early life ==
Fahima was born on 6 June 1974 to Abul Hashem Mia and Rabeya Khatun. She married to Ali Askar Qureshi.

== Legal career ==
Fahima is a lawyer of the Supreme Court of Bangladesh. She served as a deputy attorney general and was elected senior vice-president of the Supreme Court Bar Association. She is also secretary of the Bangladesh National Women Lawyers' Association, vice-president of the Bangladesh Law Association and a life member of the Dhaka University Alumni Association.

== Political career ==
Fahima serves as international affairs assistant secretary of the central executive committee of the Bangladesh Nationalist Party. She is also a member of the Standing Committee on the Ministry of Women and Children Affairs.
