= Muhammad Rabiul Bassar =

Bangladeshi politician

Members of Parliament
- Incumbent
- Assumed office 17 February 2026
- Preceded by: AFM Ruhal Haque
- Constituency: Satkhira-3

Personal details
- Born: February 1, 1966 (age 60) Middle Parulia, Debhata, Satkhira District, Bangladesh
- Party: Bangladesh Jamaat-e-Islami
- Education: University of Dhaka
- Occupation: Politician,

Muhammad Rabiul Bassar is a Bangladeshi politician of Bangladesh Jamaat-e-Islami. He was elected as the Member of Parliament for the Satkhira-3 constituency in the 2026 Bangladeshi general election held on 12 February 2026.
