= Salina Sultana Nishita =

Bangladeshi politician

- সেলিনা সুলতানা নিশিতা

Member of the Bangladesh Parliament for Reserved women seat
- Incumbent
- Assumed office 3 May 2026
- Prime Minister: Tarique Rahman

Personal details
- Born: 2 January 1979 (age 47) Hafizpur, Monohardi Upazila, Narsingdi District
- Party: Bangladesh Nationalist Party
- Parents: Ali Newaz Sarkar (father); Rabeya Sarkar (mother)
- Education: Eden Mohila College

Salina Sultana Nishita is a Bangladeshi politician of the Bangladesh Nationalist Party. She is currently serving as a Member of Parliament from reserved women seats.

== Early life ==
Nishita was born on 2 January 1979 to Ali Newaz Sarkar and Rabeya Sarkar in Hafizpur village of Monohardi Upazila under Narsingdi District.

== Career ==
Nishita served as joint general secretary in central committee of Bangladesh Jatiyatabadi Chhatra Dal.
