= Shacot Ara Akter =

Bangladeshi politician

- শওকত আরা আক্তার

Member of the Bangladesh Parliament for Reserved women seat
- Incumbent
- Assumed office 3 May 2026
- Prime Minister: Tarique Rahman

Personal details
- Born: 1 April 1977 (age 49) Madaripur District
- Party: Bangladesh Nationalist Party
- Parents: Abdul Hamid Sardar (father); Mallika Begum (mother)
- Education: Eden Mohila College

Shacot Ara Akter is a Bangladeshi politician of the Bangladesh Nationalist Party. She is currently serving as a Member of Parliament from reserved women seats.

== Early life ==
Akter was born on 31 July 1984 to Abdul Hamid Sardar and Mallika Begum in Madaripur District. He married to a family of Gosairhat Upazila under Shariatpur District.

== Career ==
Akter was joint convener of the Eden Mohila College Chhatra Dal. She also served as assistant secretary for female students' affairs, assistant general secretary and joint general secretary in central committee of Bangladesh Jatiyatabadi Chhatra Dal.
