= Shamim Ara Begum Swapna =

Bangladeshi politician

- শামীম আরা বেগম স্বপ্না

Member of the Bangladesh Parliament for Reserved women seat
- Incumbent
- Assumed office 2026
- Prime Minister: Tarique Rahman

Personal details
- Born: 1 July 1960 (age 66) Tekpara, Cox’s Bazar
- Party: Bangladesh Nationalist Party
- Spouse: Md. Jashim Uddin
- Parents: Abul Khair (father); Fatema Khatun (mother)
- Education: University of Chittagong

Shamim Ara Begum Swapna is a Bangladeshi politician of the Bangladesh Nationalist Party. She is currently serving as a Member of Parliament from reserved women seats. She is the country's first woman public prosecutor.

== Early life ==
Swapna was born on 1 Julya 1960 to Abul Khair and the Fatema Khatun in Moddhom Tekpara, Cox’s Bazar.

== Education ==
Swapna obtained an MSc in Botany from the University of Chittagong.

== Career ==
Swapna entered the legal profession as a member of the Cox's Bazar District Bar Association in 1986. After 15 year, she was appointed public prosecutor (PP) of the Cox's Bazar district court.

She joined Jatiyatabadi Chhatra Dal in 1982, while she was studying at the University of Chittagong. She served as general secretary of the Cox's Bazar district Mohila Dal and Cox's Bazar district BNP.
