= Mahfuza Hannan =

Bangladeshi politician

- মাহফুজা হান্নান

Member of the Bangladesh Parliament for Reserved women seat
- Incumbent
- Assumed office 3 May 2026
- Prime Minister: Tarique Rahman

Personal details
- Born: 20 March 1959 (age 67)
- Party: Bangladesh Jamaat-e-Islami
- Parents: Shah Tajammul Ali Siddiqui (father); Mariamunnesa Chowdhury (mother)

Mahfuza Hannan is a Bangladeshi politician of the Bangladesh Jamaat-e-Islami. She is currently serving as a Member of Parliament from reserved women seats.

== Early life ==
Hannan was born on 20 March 1959 to Shah Tajammul Ali Siddiqui and Mariamunnesa Chowdhury.

== Career ==
Hannan served as the secretary of Sylhet city women’s wings of Bangladesh Jamaat-e-Islami.
