= Shammi Akter (politician) =

Bangladeshi politician

Member of the Bangladesh Parliament for Women's Reserved Seat-38
- In office 2009–2014
- Preceded by: Newaz Halima Arli
- Succeeded by: Kamrun Nahar Chowdhury

Personal details
- Party: Bangladesh Nationalist Party

Shammi Akter is a Bangladesh Nationalist Party politician and a former member of the Bangladesh Parliament from a reserved seat.

== Early life ==
Akter was born on 2 November 1973 and she has a M.S.S. degree.

== Career ==
Akter was elected to parliament from a reserved seat as a Bangladesh Nationalist Party candidate in 2009.
