= Suborna Sikder Thakur =

Bangladeshi politician

Subarna Sikder Thakur (born 20 July 1973) is a Bangladeshi politician and former teacher. She is the member of parliament for reserved Women's Seat-20 in the 13th Parliament. She is a leader of the Matua community.

== Early life ==
Thakur was born on 20 July 1973. Her father is Anil Krishna Sikder and mother is Sova Rani Sikder. She is a former teacher and a leader of the Matua community. She is from the family of Harichand Thakur.

== Career ==
Thakur joined the Bangladesh Nationalist Party in November 2025. She was previously associated with the Awami League.

Thakur is the member of parliament for reserved Women's Seat-20 in the 13th Parliament. She is a member of the Standing Committee on the Ministry of Religious Affairs.
