= Mazharul Islam (politician) =

Bangladeshi politician (born 1957)

- মাজহারুল ইসলাম

Member of the Bangladesh Parliament for Kishoreganj-1
- Incumbent
- Assumed office 17 February 2026
- Preceded by: Syeda Zakia Noor Lipi

Personal details
- Born: 4 May 1957 (age 69) Kishoreganj Sadar Upazila, Kishoreganj District
- Party: Bangladesh Nationalist Party

Mazharul Islam is a Bangladeshi politician. As of March 2026, he is the member of parliament from Kishoreganj-1.

== Early life ==
Islam was born at Kishoreganj Sadar Upazila under Kishoreganj District.
