= Nachima Zaman Bobby =

Bangladeshi politician

Nasima Zaman Bobby
- নাসিমা জামান ববি

Member of the Bangladesh Parliament for Reserved Women's Seat-4
- In office 28 February 2024 – 6 August 2024
- Preceded by: Rowshan Ara Mannan

Personal details
- Born: 25 August 1974 (age 50)
- Political party: Bangladesh Awami League

Nachima Zaman Bobby (born 25 August 1974) is an Awami League politician and a former Jatiya Sangsad member from a women's reserved for Rangpur District. She was awarded the Bangmata Begum Fazilatunnesa Mujib Padak-2023.
