= Bithika Binte Hossain =

Bangladeshi politician

- বীথিকা বিনতে হোসাইন

Member of the Bangladesh Parliament for Reserved women seat
- Incumbent
- Assumed office 3 May 2026
- Prime Minister: Tarique Rahman

Personal details
- Born: 1 September 1980 (age 46) Ramgati Upazila, Lakshmipur District
- Party: Bangladesh Nationalist Party
- Spouse: Shafiul Bari
- Parents: A.K.M. Mofazzal Hossain (father); Ayesha Mofaz (mother)

Suraia Zarin Rony is a Bangladeshi politician of the Bangladesh Nationalist Party. She is currently serving as a Member of Parliament from reserved women seats.

== Early life ==
Bithika Benta Hossain was born on 1 September 1980 in Ramgati Upazila under Lakshmipur District.
