= Muhammad Azizur Rahman =

Bangladeshi politician

- মুহাম্মাদ আজীজুর রহমান
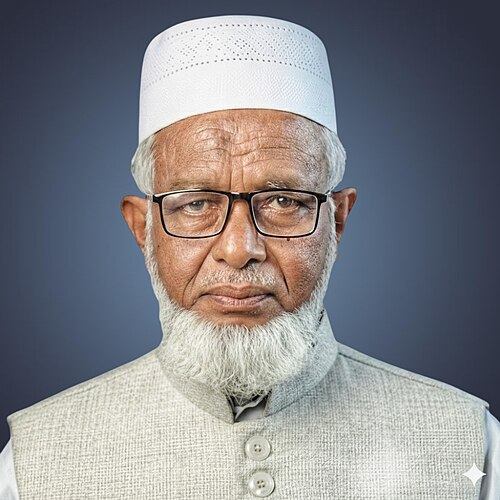

Member of the Bangladesh Parliament for Jessore-1
- Incumbent
- Assumed office 17 February 2026
- Preceded by: Sheikh Afil Uddin

Personal details
- Born: May 1, 1951 (age 75) Sharsha Upazila, Jessore District
- Party: Bangladesh Jamaat-e-Islami

Muhammad Azizur Rahman is a Bangladeshi politician of the Bangladesh Jamaat-e-Islami. He is currently serving as a member of parliament from Jessore-1.

== Early life ==
Rahman was born on 1 May 1951 in Sharsha Upazila in Jessore District.
