= Shirin Sultana =

Bangladeshi politician

Member of Bangladesh Parliament

Personal details
- Political party: Bangladesh Nationalist Party

Shirin Sultana is a Bangladesh Nationalist Party politician and a former member of parliament. She is married to Khairul Kabir Khokon. She is the general secretary of Jatiyatabadi Mohila Dal. In 2008, she contested the general election from Dhaka-9 as a Bangladesh Nationalist Party candidate. She lost to Saber Hossain Chowdhury, the Bangladesh Awami League candidate.
