= Nilufar Chowdhury Moni =

Bangladeshi politician

- নীলুফার চৌধুরী মনি

Member of Bangladesh Parliament
- Incumbent
- Assumed office 3 May 2026
- Preceded by: Farida Akter Banu
- Constituency: Women's Reserved Seat–10
- In office 19 March 2009 – 24 January 2014
- Preceded by: Khodeza Emdad Lata
- Succeeded by: Hosne Ara Begum
- Constituency: Women's Reserved Seat–37

Personal details
- Born: 15 August 1969 (age 57)
- Party: Bangladesh Nationalist Party

Nilufar Chowdhury Moni is a Bangladesh Nationalist Party politician and the incumbent Jatiya Sangsad member from the women's reserved seat–10 since May 2026.

== Career ==
Moni was elected to parliament from a reserved seat as a Bangladesh Nationalist Party candidate in 2009.

=== Controversy ===
In 2026, Moni faced criticism after she suggested that that extortion in Bangladesh was preferable to Zakat, an obligatory form of charity in Islam.
