= Sajeda Samad =

Bangladeshi politician

- সাজেদা সামাদ

Member of the Bangladesh Parliament for Reserved women seat
- Incumbent
- Assumed office 3 May 2026
- Prime Minister: Tarique Rahman

Personal details
- Born: 18 January 1964 (age 62) Bogura
- Party: Bangladesh Jamaat-e-Islami
- Parents: S. M. Abdus Sattar (father); Jibon Nesa (mother)

Sajeda Samad is a Bangladeshi politician of the Bangladesh Jamaat-e-Islami. She is currently serving as a Member of Parliament from reserved women seats.

== Early life ==
Samad was born on 18 January 1964 to S. M. Abdus Sattar and Jibon Nesa in Bogura.

== Career ==
Samad was elected vice-chairman of the Bogura Sadar Upazila. She also served as the director of Bogura region women’s wings of Bangladesh Jamaat-e-Islami.
