= Zeeba Amina Khan =

Bangladeshi politician

- জীবা আমিনা খান

Member of the Bangladesh Parliament for Women's Reserved Seat–12
- Incumbent
- Assumed office 3 May 2026
- Preceded by: Runu Reza

Personal details
- Party: Bangladesh Nationalist Party
- Spouses: Niaz Bin Karim (m. 1983, divorced); Mukarram Hossain Khan (m. 2005, divorced)

Zeeba Amina Khan is a Bangladeshi politician. She is the incumbent Jatiya Sangsad member from the Women's Reserved Seat–12 since May 2026. She is a member of the Bangladesh Nationalist Party's executive committee, vice-president of the central women's party, and a member of the Jhalokati district BNP convening committee.

== Background ==
Zeeba is originated from Jhalokati Sadar Upazila. Her father, Akhtaruddin Ahmad, was a Muslim League leader and a member of Malik ministry in 1971. His name was included in the list of Razakars and other Pakistani collaborators to the International Crimes Tribunal prepared by Muktijoddha Sangsad of Jhalokathi in 2012. He was arrested in December 1971 under the Collaborators Act, 1972. Later, he was released in the end of 1973 under a general amnesty declared by Sheikh Mujibur Rahman, pardoning all those who supported the unity of Pakistan (except individuals involved in human rights abuses). After his release, Akhtaruddin Ahmed migrated to Saudi Arabia, where he worked as a consultant for Saudia.

== Career ==
Khan lost the 2018 Bangladeshi general election to Amir Hossain Amu competing for the Jhalokati-2 constituency. In April 2026, she earned the nomination to represent the women's reserved seat-12 after the 2026 Bangladeshi general election won by Bangladesh Nationalist Party.

== Personal life ==
Khan first married Niaz Bin Karim in the United Kingdom in July 1983. In September 2005, she married Mukarram Hossain Khan, a former president of the Real Estate and Housing Association of Bangladesh (REHAB), in Bangladesh. In July 2025, she was accused of planning an attack, vandalism, looting and holding domestic workers hostage at her then ex-husband, Mukarram’s apartment.

Khan was involved with a UK-based now-defunct company, Children’s Paradise (UK).
