= Md. Abul Kalam (Comilla politician) =

Bangladeshi politician

Members of Parliament
- Incumbent
- Assumed office 17 February 2026
- Preceded by: Md. Tazul Islam
- Constituency: Comilla-9

Personal details
- Party: Bangladesh Nationalist Party
- Occupation: Politician

Md. Abul Kalam is a Bangladesh Nationalist Party politician and a current member of parliament for Comilla-9.
