= Jatiya Ganotantrik Party =

Jatiya Ganotantrik Party জাতীয় গণতান্ত্রিক পার্টি
- Abbreviation: JGP (informal)
- Chairperson: Tasmia Pradhan
- General Secretary: Iqbal Hossain Prodhan
- Spokesperson: Al Rashed Pradhan
- Founder: Shafiul Alam Pradhan
- Founded: 6 April 1980 (46 years ago)
- Headquarters: Asad Gate, Dhaka
- Student wing: JAGPA Chhatra Kafela
- Ideology: Bangladeshi nationalism Conservatism (Bangladeshi); Islamic democracy
- Political position: Centre-right to right-wing
- National affiliation: 11 Party Alliance
- Colors: Black
- Jatiya Sangsad: 1 / 350

Election symbol
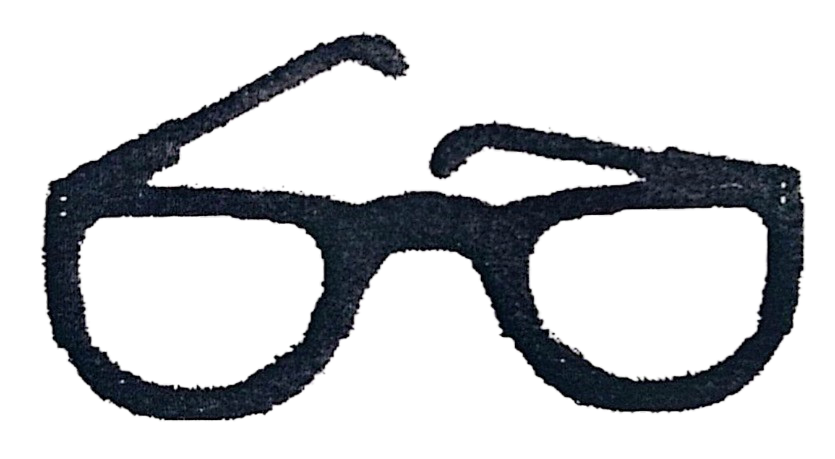
- Eyeglasses

Party flag

Website
- https://www.jagpa.org/

Jatiya Ganotantrik Party (Bengali: জাতীয় গণতান্ত্রিক পার্টি; JaGPa) is a minor political party in Bangladesh. Its founder is Shafiul Alam Pradhan who formed the JaGPa on 6 April 1980 through a press conference at Baitul Mokarram.

== Election results ==
=== Jatiya Sangsad elections ===
Election	Party leader	Votes	%	Seats	+/–	Position	Outcome
2026	Tasmia Pradhan			1 / 350	Boycotted		Opposition
