= Tasmia Pradhan =

Bangladeshi politician

Tasmia Pradhan (Bengali: তাসমিয়া প্রধান) is a Bangladeshi politician, president of the Jatiya Ganatantrik Party (JAGPA), and member of parliament.
