= Rasheda Begum Hira =

Bangladeshi politician

- রাশেদা বেগম হিরা

Member of Bangladesh Parliament
- Incumbent
- Assumed office 3 May 2026
- Preceded by: Ashika Sultana
- Constituency: Women's Reserved Seat–3
- In office 19 March 2009 – 24 January 2014
- Preceded by: Fahima Hossain Jubly
- Succeeded by: Hazera Khatun
- Constituency: Women's Reserved Seat–39

Personal details
- Born: 29 August 1957 (age 69) Chandpur, East Pakistan, Pakistan
- Party: Bangladesh Nationalist Party
- Education: University of Chittagong; University of Rajshahi

Rasheda Begum Hira (born 29 August 1957) is a Bangladesh Nationalist Party politician and the incumbent Jatiya Sangsad member from the women's reserved seat–3 since May 2026.

== Education ==
Hira obtained her master's degree from the University of Chittagong in 1981 and Mphil degree from the University of Rajshahi in 1990. During her student years at the university, she was involved in politics with the Bangladesh Nationalist Student Organization since 1979.

== Career ==
Hira was first elected to parliament from a reserved seat as a Bangladesh Nationalist Party candidate in 2009.
