= Begum Badrunnesa Government Girls' College =

Public women's college in Dhaka, Bangladesh

- বেগম বদরুন্নেসা সরকারি মহিলা কলেজ
- Crest of BBGGC
- Other name: BBGGC
- Former name: Dhaka Government Girls' College
- Motto: জ্ঞানই আলো
- Motto in English: Knowledge is light
- Type: Public
- Established: 1948; 78 years ago
- Parent institution: Dhaka Central University
- Affiliations: Dhaka Education Board
- Chancellor: President of Bangladesh
- Vice-Chancellor: Md. Lutfor Rahaman
- Principal: Tamanna Begum
- Location: Bakshi Bazar, Puran Dhaka, Dhaka, Bangladesh; 23.7234°N 90.3958°E
- Campus: 2.15 acres (0.87 ha); Urban
- Website: www.bbggc.gov.bd

Begum Badrunnesa Govt. Girls' College (Dhaka Central University Attached: Begum Badrunnesa Govt. Girls' College, Dhaka) informally known as BBGGC is a public educational institution in Dhaka, Bangladesh. The college was incorporated in 1948 as an intermediate college under Eden Girls' College. In 1962 Eden College gained a second campus at Azimpur, and the older campus at Bakshi Bazar was renamed and later separated from Eden Mohila College, Dhaka. Badrunnesa Girls' College obtained approval to offer honours degrees in 16 subjects in 2004, and has also received approval for running master's degrees in Bangla, English, sociology, history, and home economics.

It was affiliated with the University of Dhaka from February 2017 to January 2025.

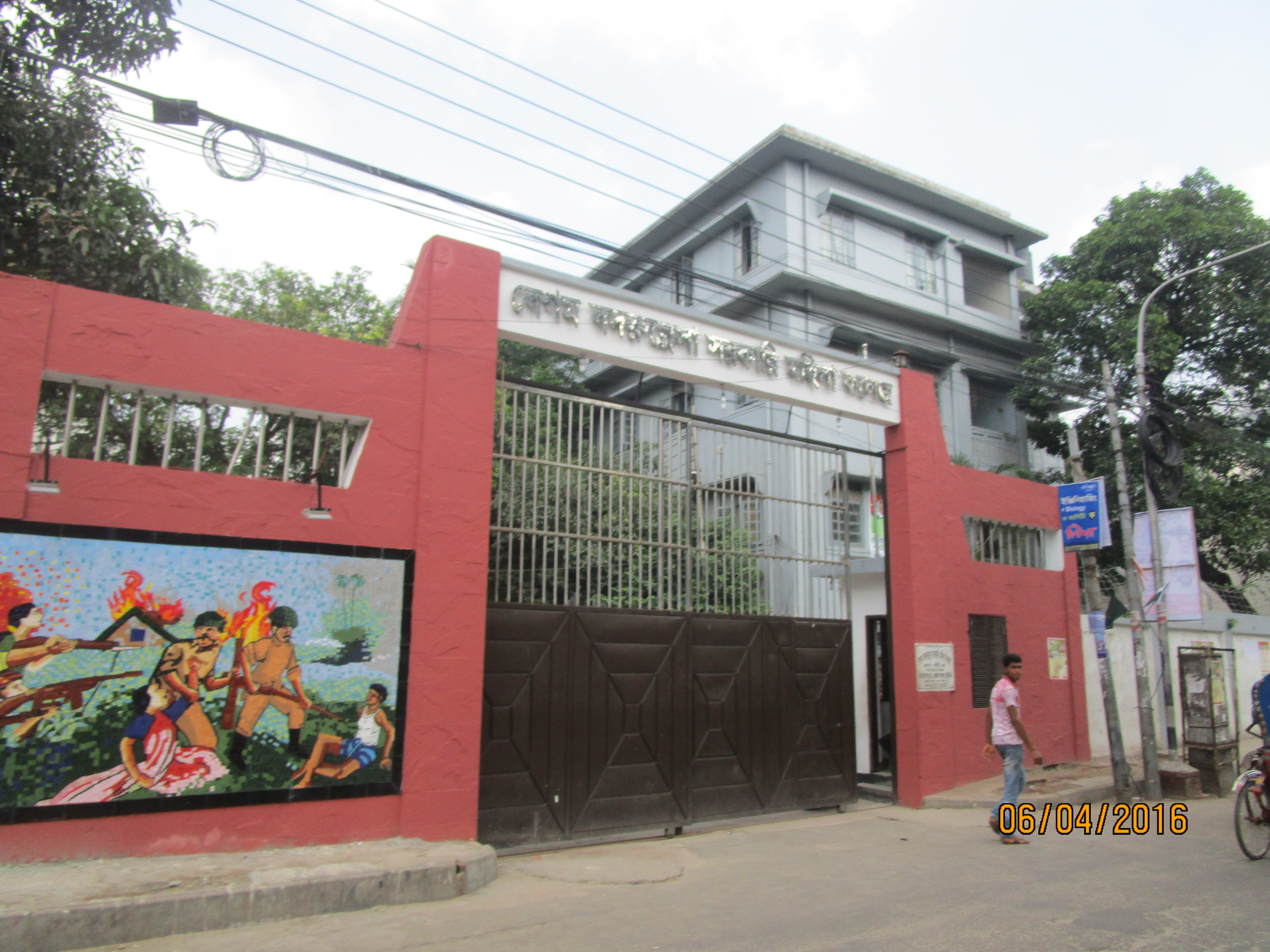
Main gate of Begum Badrunnesa Govt. College

== Academics ==
Faculty of Arts

- Bangla
- English
- Philosophy
- Islamic History and Culture

Faculty of Social Science

- Sociology
- Political Science
- Home Economics
- Economics
- Social Work

Faculty of Business Studies

- Accounting
- Finance and Banking
- Management Studies

Faculty of Science

- Physics
- Chemistry
- Mathematics
- Statistics
- Botany
- Zoology

== Notable alumni ==
- Sheikh Hasina - Former Prime Minister of Bangladesh
- Sultana Kamal - Bangladeshi athlete
- Sabikun Nahar Munni - Bangladeshi politician
- Runa Khan - Bangladeshi actress
- Shabnam Ferdousi - Bangladeshi film maker
- Shirin Akhter - Bangladeshi politician
