= Bangladesh Islami Chhatri Sangstha =

Female student wing of Bangladesh Jamaat-e-Islami

Bangladesh Islami Chhatri Sangstha বাংলাদেশ ইসলামী ছাত্রীসংস্থা
- Emblem of Bangladesh Islami Chhatri Sangstha
- President: Muhtaramah Munjia
- Secretary General: Nahian Fairuz Nazifa
- Founded: 15 July 1978; 48 years ago
- Headquarters: Dhaka, Bangladesh
- Ideology: Islamism
- National affiliation: Bangladesh Jamaat-e-Islami (de facto)
- International affiliation: International Islamic Federation of Student Organizations; World Assembly of Muslim Youth
- National Male affiliation: Bangladesh Islami Chhatra Shibir (de facto)
- Website: islamichhatrisangstha.org

Bangladesh Islami Chhatri Sangstha (Bengali: বাংলাদেশ ইসলামী ছাত্রীসংস্থা, lit. 'Bangladesh Islamic Female Students Association') is an Islamic political organization dedicated to female students in Bangladesh. It is considered a de facto affiliate of Bangladesh Jamaat-e-Islami.

The organization was founded on 15 July 1978 by eleven students at Eden Mohila College. From 2009 onwards, under the administration of the Awami League-led government, the organization faced significant government pressure. Following the July Uprising on 5 August 2024, the organization resumed public activities across the country.

In addition to pursuing its political goals, the organization undertakes social initiatives among its student membership. Members annually elect a central president and nominate a secretary to oversee organizational affairs. Currently, the central president is Muhtaramah Munjia. The organization runs committees in schools, colleges, madrasas, public and private universities, medical colleges—as well as at thana, district, and metropolitan levels.

== History ==
On 15 July 1978, the Bangladesh Islami Chhatri Sangstha was established by eleven students at Eden Mohila College, with Khondker Ayesha Khatun as the organization's founding central president.

After the Awami League came to power in 2009, many of the organization's leaders and activists were arrested, with authorities citing security concerns. In particular, from 2013 onward, the organization faced increasing government restrictions, including arrests, remands, and expulsions of affiliated students from institutions. In September 2016, a government notification under Prime Minister Sheikh Hasina’s administration banned the organization’s activities in educational institutions.

Following the July Uprising and the fall of the Awami League government, the organization was once again able to organize rallies and expand its presence in educational institutions.

== Government restrictions and ban ==
After the Bangladesh Awami League came to power and until the July Uprising, the organization faced various legal actions and restrictions. From 2009 to 2016, dozens of students from Khilgaon, Dhaka, and the University of Dhaka were detained or taken into custody. In August 2016, the Ministry of Education directed both the University Grants Commission and the Islamic Arabic University to take steps to suspend the activities of the Islami Chhatri Sangstha. Following that directive, official letters were issued banning the organization's chapters in numerous colleges, universities, and in fazil (bachelor) and kamil (master) level madrasahs. Subsequently, arrests continued: from January 2017 to October 2019, dozens of students were arrested nationwide.

== Objectives ==
The Islami Chhatri Sangstha claims to have a three-part program:

1. "Widespread dissemination and propagation of a correct understanding of Islam among female students."
2. "Organizing Muslim students into a cohesive body and providing them training on Islamic principles and conduct."
3. "Establishing the dignity of the student community and undertaking measures to resolve their multifaceted challenges."

== See also ==
- Bangladesh Islami Chhatra Shibir
- Kishore Kantho
- Islami Chhatra Andolan Bangladesh
- List of student organizations in Bangladesh
