= 13th Jatiya Sangsad =

Current term of the Bangladeshi legislature

←	12th Jatiya Sangsad	14th Jatiya Sangsad	→
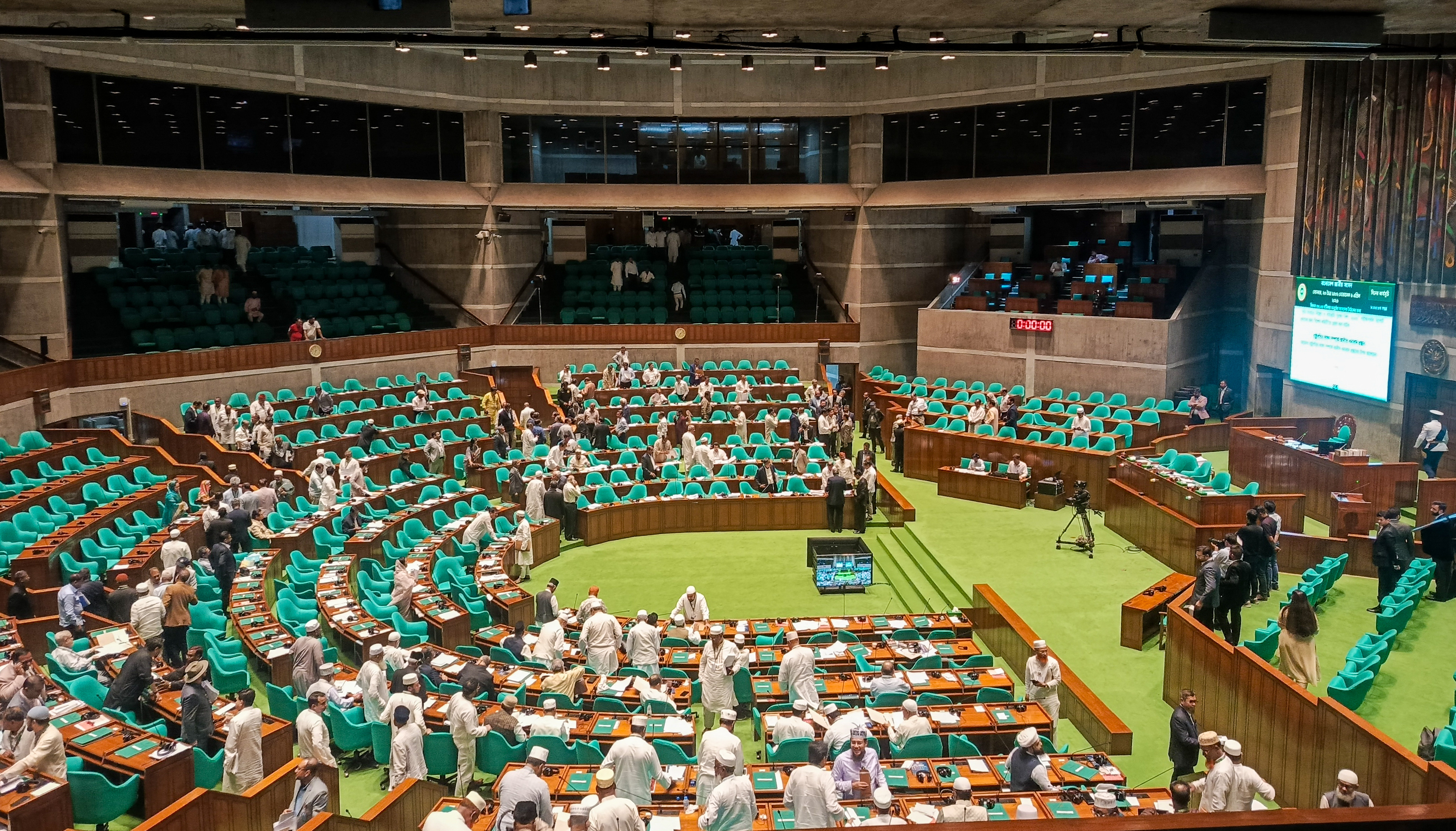
- 1st session of the 13th Jatiya Sangsad

Overview
- Legislative body: Jatiya Sangsad
- Meeting place: Jatiya Sangsad Bhaban
- Term: 17 February 2026 –
- Election: 2026
- Government: Tarique Rahman ministry
- Opposition: Bangladesh Jamaat-e-Islami

Sovereign
- President: Mirza Fakhrul Islam Alamgir

House of the Nation
- Members: 350
- Speaker of the House: Hafiz Uddin Ahmad (BNP)
- Deputy Speaker of the House: Kayser Kamal (BNP)
- Leader of the House: Tarique Rahman (BNP)
- Leader of the Opposition: Shafiqur Rahman (Jamaat)
- Deputy Leader of the Opposition: Syed Abdullah Muhammad Taher (Jamaat)

Sessions
- 1st: 12 March 2026 – 30 April 2026

The 13th Jatiya Sangsad (Note: Bengali: ত্রয়োদশ জাতীয় সংসদ, romanized: Trôẏôdôś Jātīẏô Sôṅsôd, pronounced [ˈtrɔyoˑdɔʃ ˈdʒati̯oˑ ˈʃɔŋʃɔd]) is the current parliament of Bangladesh, formed following the general election held on 12 February 2026. The Bangladesh Nationalist Party, led by Prime Minister Tarique Rahman, secured over 200 seats, achieving a clear parliamentary majority and forming the 25th government cabinet.

== Members ==
=== Party-wise distribution of seats ===
Party-wise distribution with leaders
Party	Seats	Leader	Leader's seat	Alliance	
BNP	246	Tarique Rahman	Dhaka-17 (Won)		BNP+
Jamaat	76	Shafiqur Rahman	Dhaka-15 (Won)		11 Party Alliance
NCP	8	Nahid Islam	Dhaka-11 (Won)		11 Party Alliance
BKM	3	Mamunul Haque	Dhaka-13 (Lost)		11 Party Alliance
BJP	1	Andaleeve Rahman	Bhola-1 (Won)		BNP+
GSA	1	Zonayed Saki	Brahmanbaria-6 (Won)		BNP+
GOP	1	Nurul Haque Nur	Patuakhali-3 (Won)		BNP+
KM	1	Abdul Basit Azad	Habiganj-2 (lost)		11 Party Alliance
Jatiya Ganotantrik Party	1	Tasmia Pradhan	Did not contest		11 Party Alliance
IAB	1	Syed Rezaul Karim	Did not contest		None
IND	9	NA			Others
Vacant	2	NA			
Total	350	-	-	-	-

== Session ==
=== First ===
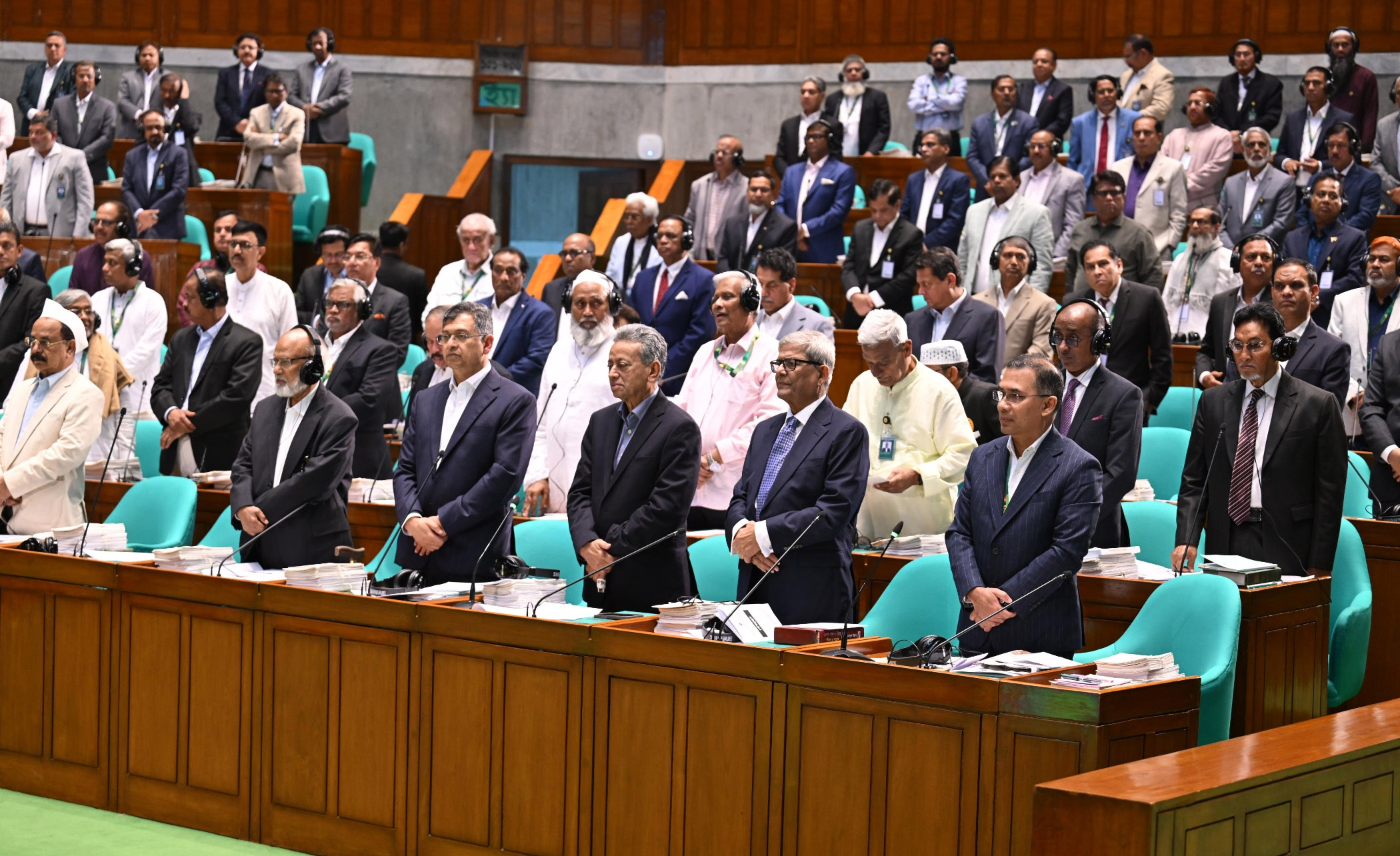
MPs of the ruling coalition standing during the condolence motion of former prime minister Khaleda Zia on the inaugural day, 12 March 2026

The first session of the 13th Jatiya Sangsad was convened on 12 March 2026 at the parliament chamber of the Jatiya Sangsad Bhaban in Dhaka, following the general election held on 12 February 2026. The session was summoned by President Mohammed Shahabuddin in accordance with Article 72(1) of the Constitution of Bangladesh, which requires the president to call the first sitting of a newly elected parliament.

The opening sitting marked the formal commencement of the legislative term of the new parliament. Newly elected members attended the session to begin parliamentary proceedings after the publication of election results and the administration of their oaths. One of the principal procedural matters during the session was the election of the Speaker and Deputy Speaker of parliament, who subsequently assumed responsibility for presiding over the proceedings of the House.

The session also included the president's address to Parliament, which traditionally outlines the government's policy priorities and legislative agenda for the upcoming term. After the address, MPs are expected to hold discussions and pass a motion of thanks. Additionally, several ordinances issued during the tenure of the interim government were scheduled to be placed before the House for approval or rejection, as the Constitution requires Parliament to decide on such ordinances within a limited time after its first sitting.

Politically, the session began following the formation of a new government led by Tarique Rahman as Prime Minister and Leader of the House, while Shafiqur Rahman served as Leader of the Opposition. The new parliament also faced early policy discussions, including matters related to constitutional reforms proposed after the recent political transition.
