= 5th Jatiya Sangsad =

Type
- Type: unicameral
- Term limits: 4 years 8 months

History
- Founded: April 5, 1991
- Disbanded: November 24, 1995

Leadership
- Speaker: Sheikh Razzak Ali
- Deputy Speaker: Humayun Khan Panni
- Leader of the House: Khaleda Zia
- Leader of the Opposition: Sheikh Hasina

Structure
- Seats: 330
- Political groups: Government (154): BNP (136); Jamaat-e-Islami (18); Opposition (143): Awami League (92); National Party (35); Bangladesh Krishak Sramik Awami League (5); CPB (5); Islamic Unity Alliance (1); NAP-Muzaffar (1); Ganathantri Party (1); National Democratic Party (1); JSD-Siraj (1); Workers' Party (1); Other: Independent (3); Female (30)

Meeting place
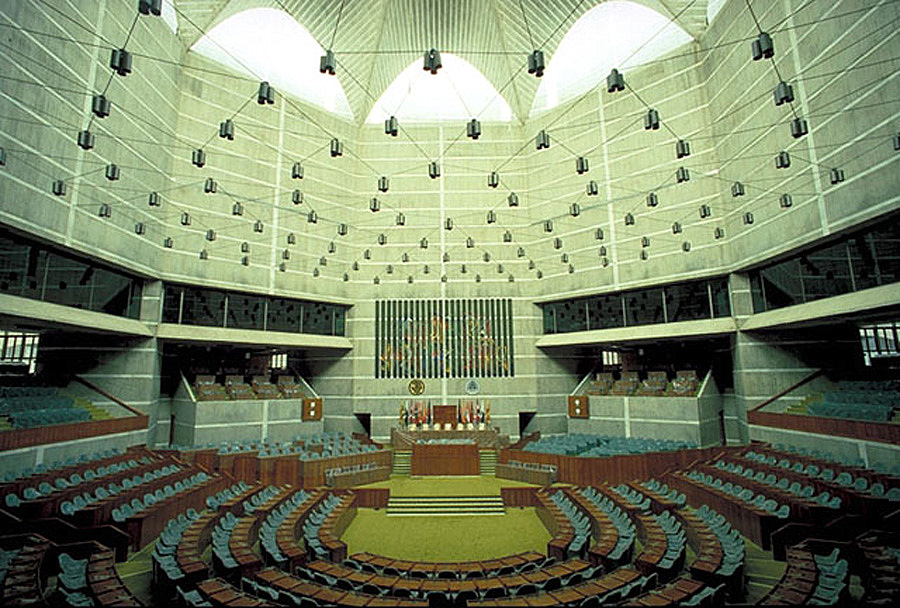
- Jatiya Sangsad Bhaban, Sher-e-Bangla Nagar, Dhaka, Bangladesh

Website
- https://www.parliament.gov.bd/

The 5th Jatiya Sangsad (5 April 1991 – 24 November 1995) was formed by the members of parliament elected in the Fifth National Parliament election on 27 February 1991. Of the two main parties in the election, the Bangladesh Nationalist Party won 140 of the 300 seats in the National Parliament, while the Bangladesh Awami League won 88 seats. The Bangladesh Nationalist Party formed the government headed by Khaleda Zia. The first session of the Fifth Parliament began on 5 April 1991. The Fifth Parliament began its journey with a total of 330 members of parliament, including 300 elected directly by the people and 30 from reserved seats for women. The cabinet was formed on 20 March. Abdur Rahman Biswas was elected speaker of the Parliament and Sheikh Razzak Ali was elected deputy speaker. Later, when Abdur Rahman Biswas was elected president, Sheikh Razzak Ali was elected speaker and Humayun Khan Panni was elected deputy speaker. The Awami League was granted opposition status in parliament and Sheikh Hasina was elected opposition leader.

== Prominent members ==
Name	Photo	Designation	Term	Political party
Abdur Rahman Biswas		Speaker	5 April 1991 - 25 September 1991	Bangladesh Nationalist Party
Sheikh Razzak Ali		Speaker	12 October 1991 - 19 March 1996	Bangladesh Nationalist Party
Sheikh Razzak Ali		Deputy Speaker	5 April 1991 - 25 September 1991	Bangladesh Nationalist Party
Humayun Khan Panni		Deputy Speaker	12 October 1991 - 19 March 1996	Bangladesh Nationalist Party
Khaleda Zia		Leader of Parliament	20 March 1991 - 24 November 1995	Bangladesh Nationalist Party
AQM Badruddoza Chowdhury		Deputy Leader	20 March 1991 - 24 November 1995	Bangladesh Nationalist Party
Khandaker Delwar Hossain		Chief Whip	5 April 1991 - 24 November 1995	Bangladesh Nationalist Party
Ashraf Hossain		Whip	20 March 1991 - 24 November 1995	Bangladesh Nationalist Party
Mahbubul Alam Tara		Whip	20 March 1991 - 24 November 1995	Bangladesh Nationalist Party
Abdul Karim Abbasi		Whip	20 March 1991 - 24 November 1995	Bangladesh Nationalist Party
Shahjahan Mia		Whip	20 March 1991 - 24 November 1995	Bangladesh Nationalist Party
Sheikh Hasina		Leader of the Opposition	20 March 1991 - 24 November 1995	Bangladesh Awami League
Abdus Samad Azad		Deputy Leader of the Opposition	20 March 1991 - 24 November 1995	Bangladesh Awami League
Mohammad Nasim		Chief Whip of the Opposition	20 March 1991 - 24 November 1995	Bangladesh Awami League
Azizur Rahman		Whip	20 March 1991 - 24 November 1995	Bangladesh Awami League
Abul Hasan Chowdhury		Whip	20 March 1991 - 24 November 1995	Bangladesh Awami League
Sheikh Harunur Rashid		Whip	20 March 1991 - 24 November 1995	Bangladesh Awami League
