= 11th Jatiya Sangsad =

Bangladeshi legislative term, 2019–2024

←	10th	12th	→
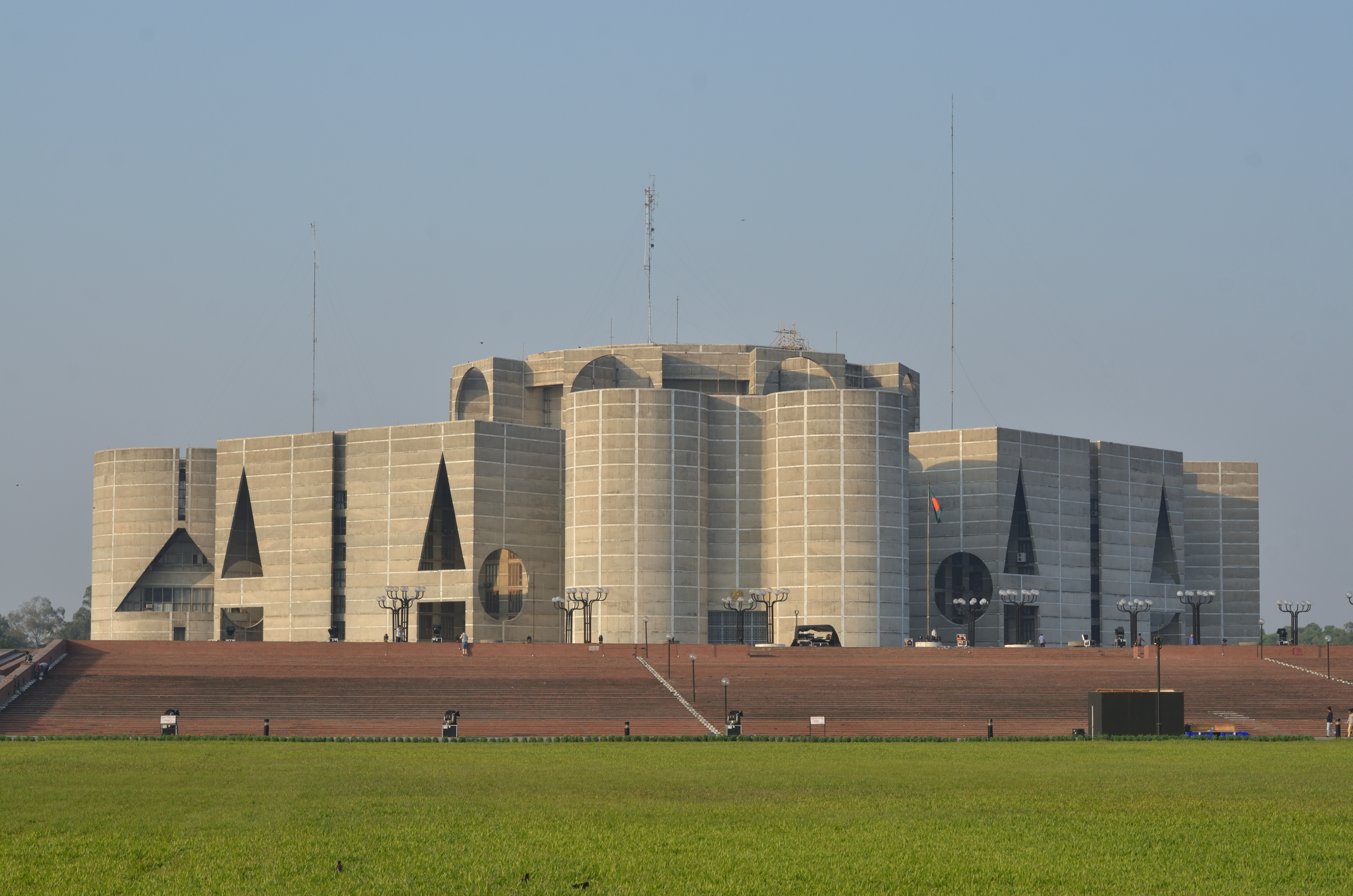
- Jatiya Sangsad Bhaban

Overview
- Legislative body: Bangladesh Parliament
- Term: 7 January 2019 – 30 January 2024
- Election: 2018 Bangladeshi general election
- Government: Fourth Hasina ministry
- Opposition: Jatiya Party (Ershad)

Sovereign
- President: Mohammad Abdul Hamid

House of the Nation
- Members: 350
- Speaker of the House: Shirin Sharmin Chaudhury
- Deputy Speaker of the House: Shamsul Hoque Tuku
- Leader of the House: Sheikh Hasina
- Prime Minister: Sheikh Hasina
- Deputy Leader of the House: Matia Chowdhury
- Leader of the Opposition: Rowshan Ershad
- Deputy Leader of the Opposition: GM Quader

Sessions
- 1st: 7 January 2019 – 30 January 2024

The Eleventh Jatiya Sangsad (Bengali: একাদশ জাতীয় সংসদ, romanized: ēkadasha jatīẏa saṅsada, lit. 'Eleventh National Parliament') was formed with the elected members of the 11th General Election of Bangladesh 2018. The Parliament was sworn in on 3 January 2019. On seventh January the Ministers were sworn in. On 30 January, the first session of the parliament took place. Out of the 350 seats 300 members are directly elected by the people and rest 50 seats are reserved for women and are filled by proportional representation. Awami League won 258 seats out of the 300 seats and formed the government under the leadership of Sheikh Hasina Jatiya Party got 22 seats and became the main opposition party.

== Prominent members ==
Name	Image	Post	Term	Political Party
Shirin Sharmin Chaudhury		Speaker	January 3, 2019 - January 30, 2024	AL
Shamsul Hoque Tuku		Deputy Speaker	August 28, 2022 - January 30, 2024	AL
Sheikh Hasina		Leader of the House	January 3, 2019 - January 30, 2024	AL
Matia Chowdhury		Deputy Leader	January 13, 2013 - January 30, 2024	AL
Noor-E-Alam Chowdhury		Chief Whip	January 3, 2019 - January 30, 2024	AL
Atiur Rahman Atik		Whip	January 3, 2019 - January 30, 2024	AL
Panchanan Biswas		Whip	January 3, 2019 - January 30, 2024	AL
Iqbalur Rahim		Whip	January 3, 2019 - January 30, 2024	AL
Mahabub Ara Begum		Whip	January 3, 2019 - January 30, 2024	AL
Shamsul Haq Chowdhury		Whip	January 3, 2019 - January 30, 2024	AL
Abu Sayeed Al Mahmud Swapon		Whip	January 3, 2019 - January 30, 2024	AL
Hussain Muhammad Ershad		Opposition Leader	January 3, 2019 - 14 July 2019	JP
Rowshan Ershad		Opposition Leader	8 September 2019 - January 30, 2024	JP
GM Quader		Deputy Leader of the Opposition	January 3, 2019 - January 30, 2024	JP
Mashiur Rahman Ranga		Chief Whip of the Opposition	January 3, 2019 - January 30, 2024	JP

== Sessions ==
=== First ===
On 30 January 2019 the first session of Eleventh Sangsad was started and this session ended on the 11th March after 26 working days. In the beginning of the session President Mohammad Abdul Hamid addressed the house. 194 members attended the discussion on the Presidential Address and after 54 hours and 57 minutes a tanking proposal was passed. A total of five bills were passed in this session and 50 parliamentary committees were formed within 10 working days. According to Rule-71 of the Rules of Procedure of the Bangladesh Parliament, 321 notices were submitted in this session out of which 30 were accepted and 18 were discussed. As per Rule 71 (a), 155 more notices were discussed.। Out of 114 questions submitted for the Leader of Parliament, 48 questions were answered. Of the 2,325 questions submitted to the ministers, 1,630 were answered. During the session, Sultan Mohammad Mansur Ahmed of Gano Forum was sworn in on 7 March. Members of the reserved women's seat were sworn in on 20 February.

=== Second ===
The second session of the parliament started on April 24, 2019, and ended after 5 working days. During the second session, five members elected from the Bangladesh Nationalist Party took oath. According to the Rules of Procedure of the Parliament of Bangladesh, 71 notices were submitted in this session out of which 9 were accepted and 1 was discussed. Besides, 44 notices under Rule 71 (a) were discussed. Out of 44 questions submitted for the Leader of Parliament, 11 questions were answered. Of the 1,040 questions submitted for ministers, 365 were answered.
