= Sultan Ahmed (deputy speaker) =

Bangladeshi politician

Sultan Ahmed Chowdhury

2nd Deputy Speaker of the Jatiya Sangsad
- In office 3 April 1979 – 4 March 1982
- Speaker: Mirza Ghulam Hafiz
- Preceded by: Mohammad Baitullah
- Succeeded by: Md Korban Ali

Minister of Ports Shipping and IWT
- In office 5 March 1982 – 24 March 1982
- Prime Minister: Shah Azizur Rahman
- Preceded by: Shamsul Huda Chowdhury
- Succeeded by: Mahbub Ali Khan

Minister of Post Telegraph and Telephone
- In office 5 March 1982 – 24 March 1982
- Prime Minister: Shah Azizur Rahman
- Preceded by: AKM Maidul Islam
- Succeeded by: Mahbub Ali Khan

Member of the Bangladesh Parliament for Chittagong-8
- In office 18 February 1979 – 24 March 1982
- Preceded by: Zahur Ahmad Chowdhury
- Succeeded by: Mohammad Ishaq Miah

Personal details
- Born: 16 August 1932 Chowdhury Bari, North Halisahar, Chittagong
- Died: 19 June 1992 (aged 59) Royal Mersdon Hospital, London, United Kingdom
- Party: Bangladesh Nationalist Party
- Education: Dhaka University (BA, MA)

Sultan Ahmed Chowdhury (16 August 1932 – 19 June 1992) was a Bangladesh Nationalist Party politician. He served as deputy Speaker of Bangladesh Parliament.

== Early life and education ==
Barrister Sultan completed his school certificate exam in Ctg. Govt Muslim High School in the year 1946 after that he passed H.S.C Exam with first division under Dhaka University in the year 1948. Then he completed B.A (hons.) in political science from same university and also perform his master's degree with a distinction in political science. In 1954, he was invited as honorary lecturer in same university's Political Science Dept. He passed the barrister-at-law exam with the highest marks in constitution law and Mohammedan law from Lincoln's Inn. He also studied economics in Berlin in 1960.

== Government and state duty ==
From 1955 to 1957, Ahmed served in the Ministry of Central Industries, works and irrigation as a joint secretary with concern central Minister and famous Bangladeshi industrialist A.K Khan. Ahmed was the deputy speaker and as a full cabinet minister status from April 1979 to March 1982 with efficiency and utmost impartiality when the members of both treasury, and opposition bench unanimously agreed Deputy Speaker to enjoy the rank and status of full-fledged cabinet minister by enacting a law. Prior permission and request of honbl'e President he performed as the speaker of the Bangladesh Parliament Session in April–May 1980 when Honb'le Speaker went and stay long time medical visit in then East Germany. In March 1982 Ahmed took over as a port, shipping, i w t a and post, T & T minister. Barrister Sultan attend inter Parliamentary Conference Colombo, Sri Lanka in 1979. He was elected vice-chairman of the inter-parliamentary union in Norway. He attended various international-level conferences and seminars several times. Later, Ahmed served in the Bangladesh cabinet as a planning minister in 1985. He visited India and Cuba as a state or presidential representative. In 1980 He was the first civil administrator of the Chittagong Municipal Corporation 1986–1987.

== Political life ==
Ahmed began his political career in 1942. He took many responsibilities including that of organization secretary, presidential adviser in political parties, and advisory roles in various social, educational organizations and Trade body. He was associated with the great national leader Husuin Shaheed Suhrawardy and politician of Bangladesh and labour leader Zahur Ahmed Chowdhury. In 1984, with senior party leaders, he organized the first public and political meeting against the autocratic political system at the historic Laldighi Maidan in Chittagong. Barrister Sultan played coordinator role in greater Chittagong for 3rd presidential election which was held on 15 November 1981.

Mr. Chowdhury is personally involved in the constituency and development activities of many schools, colleges, mosques, madrasas and cultural organizations in the country. He was the founder of Barrister Sultan Ahmad Chowdhury College and Patia A, J Chowdhury College at port, Epz and patenga area. Now this college is upgraded as a post graduate college. While in the Ministry of Planning, Government of Bangladesh, he made relentless efforts in formulating and approving various development projects of Chittagong. He funded and patronised pahartali college, South halishahar High school, jeeri madrasa at patiya and many other school colleges, madrasas, mandir and pagodas, etc. He was also a secretary of Burmese citizens repatriation committee.

== Business career ==
Ahmed established businesses including salt production and a sawmill. He engaged with transport and local shipping businesses. Barrister Sultan was one of the initial promoter of Pubali Bank Ltd. in 1985He was the key promoter, vice chairman and director of the former Al Baraka Islamic Bank in Bangladesh. He was the sponsor shareholder/director of Federal Insurance co ltd. He was connected with local shipyard, timber, and textile industries. Ahmed participated in world agricultural seminars of held concern to Bangladesh which were held in the U.S. Personale life
