= Shadow cabinet of Bangladesh =

Group of opposition spokespeople

Following the 2026 Bangladeshi general election, the 11 Party Alliance, led by the Jamaat-e-Islami, declared to form a shadow cabinet. It's the first such type of arrangement in the parliamentary history of Bangladesh.

== Background ==
In 2026 general election, Bangladesh Nationalist Party (BNP) got a landslide victory by securing 209 of the 297 seats of the Jatiya Sangsad. On the other side, the Jamaat-e-Islami secured 68 seats, becoming the main opposition in the parliament. The party accused BNP of "election engineering", and requested the Election Commission to count the votes of 32 constituencies again. Nevertheless, the party accepted BNP's victory.

On the night of 12 February 2026, Asif Mahmud, the spokesperson of the National Citizen Party (NCP), and Shishir Monir, a lost Jamaat candidate from Sunamganj-2 constituency, declared in Facebook to form a shadow cabinet for ensuring transparency and accountability in the government.

Shadow cabinet is a prominent feature in the Westminster system. Under the system, the opposition nominates some ministers parallel to the ministers of the actual cabinet. Their task is to observe, criticize the activities of the actual ministries and recommend alternative proposals if necessary, as well as to cooperate with the stakeholders of the respective ministries. The system plays key role in the Western parliamentary systems, such as in the parliament of the United Kingdom and the parliament of Australia.

=== Receptions ===
The move was welcomed by the political analysts. Analysts believe that it is a powerful way to ensure accountability in a democratic system, and that the opposition will be able to play a more effective role from within parliament by this. They also argued that this new concept in Bangladeshi politics that will help to change the old political culture of parliament boycott by the opposition. The BNP also welcomed the move.

== List of members ==
Members		Shadows	
Name	Position	Name	Position
Shafiqur Rahman	Leader of the Opposition	Tarique Rahman	Prime Minister of Bangladesh
Syed Abdullah Mohammed Taher	Deputy Leader of the Opposition	Salahuddin Ahmed	Minister of Home Affairs
Nahid Islam	Chief Whip of the Opposition	Nurul Islam Moni	Chief Whip

== See also ==
- Tarique ministry
- Caretaker government of Bangladesh
