= Sourendra Nath Chakraborty =

Bangladeshi politician

Saurendra Nath Chakrabhartty
- সৌরেন্দ্র নাথ চক্রবর্ত্তী

Member of the Bangladesh Parliament for Naogaon-3
- In office 10 January 2024 – 6 August 2024
- Preceded by: Salim Uddin Tarafder
- Succeeded by: Md. Fazley Houda

Personal details
- Born: 1961 (age 64–65) Badalgachhi thana, Naogaon, East Pakistan
- Party: Awami League
- Children: 2
- Education: University of Rajshahi

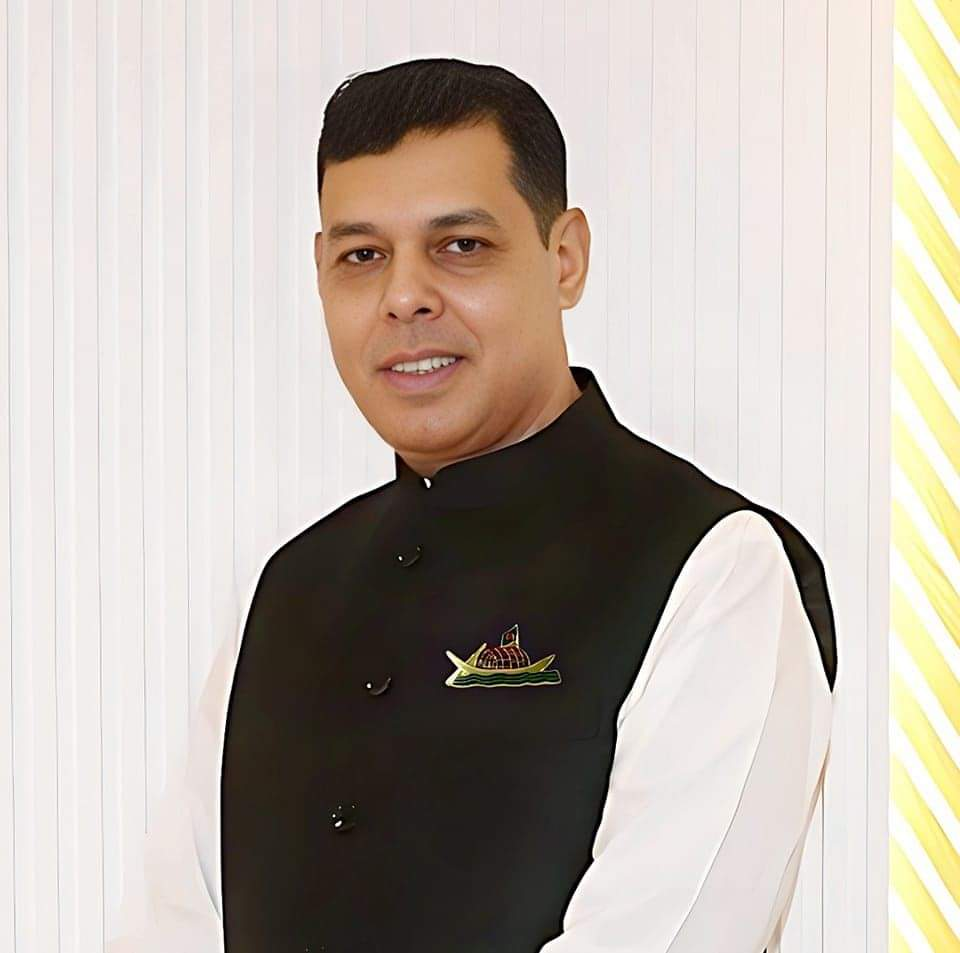

Saurendra Nath Chakrabhartty (born 1961; also known as Sauren) is a retired Bangladeshi government official and politician from the Awami League. He is a former member of the Jatiya Sangsad representing the Naogaon-3 constituency. Prior to this, he had served as senior secretary in the Department of Statistics and Information Management of the Ministry of Planning.

== Early life ==
Sourendra Nath Chakraborty was born in 1961 in what is now Badalgachhi Upazila of Naogaon District. His father is Brajendra Nath Chakraborty, and his mother is Savita Chakraborty. He received his master's degree with a BA in political science from Rajshahi University and an LLB degree from the same university.

== Career ==
Chakraborty is an officer of the seventh batch (1985) of the BCS Administration cadre. He started his career on 15 February 1988 in the BCS administration cadre as assistant commissioner and magistrate in the office of the deputy commissioner, Magura.

Before joining the post of secretary of the Statistics and Information Management Department on 30 January 2018, he served as additional secretary in the Local Government Department under the Ministry of Local Government, Rural Development and Co-operatives. He served as the national project director (NPD) of the Upazila Governance Project (UZGP) funded by UNDP. He also served as joint secretary in the Local Government Department.

Before serving as deputy commissioner of Rangamati, he served as director of the Directorate General of Jute. He also served as senior assistant secretary in the Jatiya Sangsad Secretariat. He was promoted as senior secretary on 18 May 2020.

== Politics ==
On 26 November 2023, he was nominated for the Naogaon-3 seat as a parliamentary candidate of the Awami League in the 2024 Bangladeshi general election. He was elected a member of parliament on 7 January 2024.
