= Md. Fazley Houda =

Bangladeshi politician

- মোঃ ফজলে হুদা
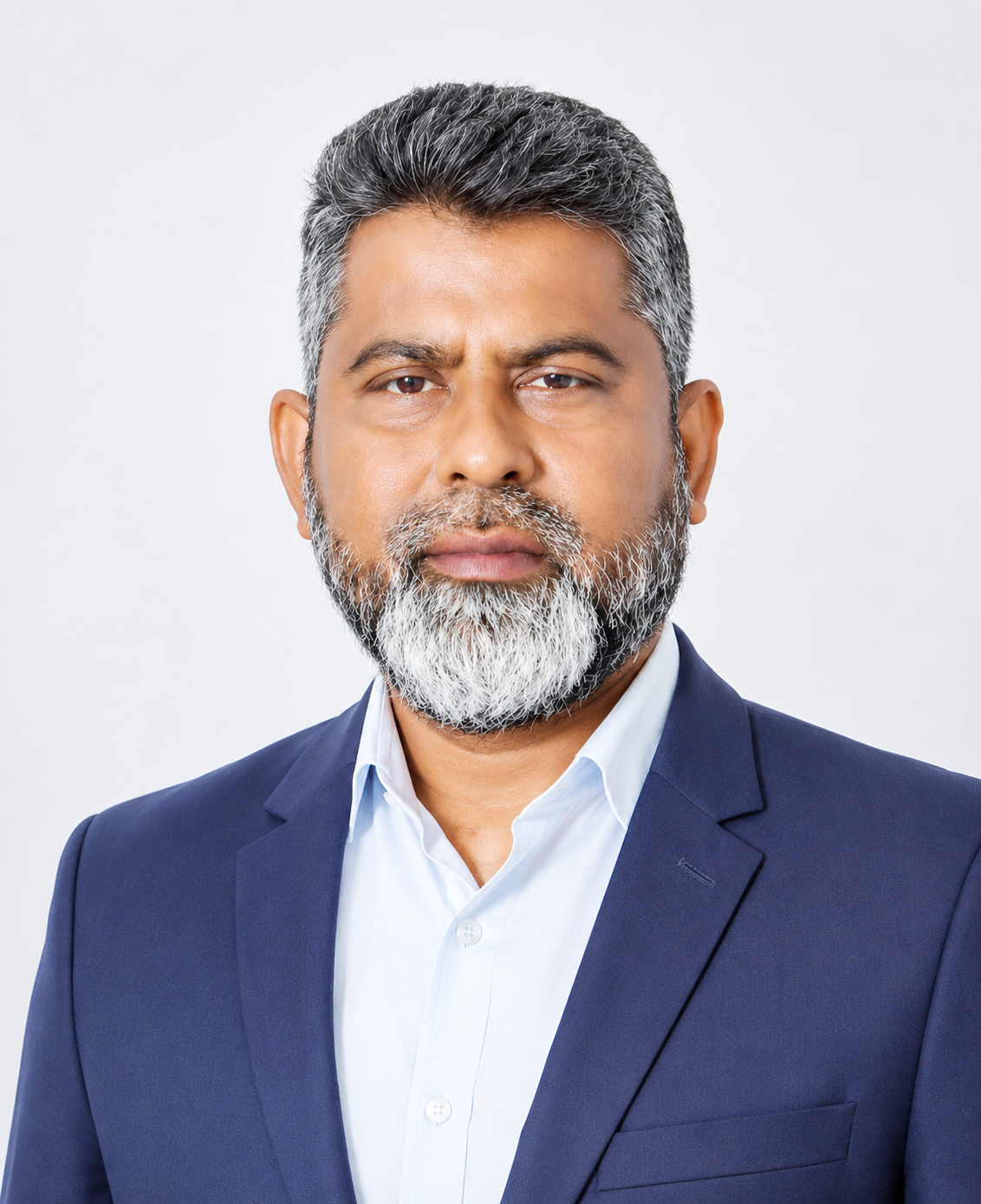

Member of the Bangladesh Parliament for Naogaon-3
- Incumbent
- Assumed office 17 February 2026
- Preceded by: Sourendra Nath Chakraborty

Personal details
- Born: 15 February 1973 (age 53) Badalgachhi Upazila, Naogaon District
- Party: Bangladesh Nationalist Party

Md. Fazley Houda is a Bangladeshi politician of the Bangladesh Nationalist Party. He is currently serving as a member of parliament from Naogaon-3.

== Early life ==
Houda was born on 15 February 1973 in Badalgachhi Upazila in Naogaon District.
