= Deputy Leader of the House =

Deputy Leader of the House is a title used in several parliamentary systems for a senior legislator appointed to assist the Leader of the House. The Deputy Leader typically supports the Leader in managing government or legislative business and stands in during their absence. The role and title vary by country and parliamentary chamber.

== Australia ==
- Deputy Leader of the House (Australia), federal parliament
- Deputy Leader of Government Business in the Senate, the federal upper house equivalent
- Deputy Leader of the House (Queensland)
- Deputy Leader of Government Business in the House of Assembly (South Australia)
- Deputy Leader of the Government in the Legislative Council (South Australia)
- Deputy Leader of the House (New South Wales)
- Deputy Leader of the House in the Victorian Legislative Assembly
- Deputy Leader of the Government in the Victorian Legislative Council

== Bangladesh ==
- Deputy Leader of Parliament (Bangladesh), in the Jatiya Sangsad (National Parliament of Bangladesh)

== Canada ==
- Deputy Leader of the Government in the House of Commons of Canada, federal parliament
- Deputy Representative of the Government in the Senate (Canada)
- Deputy Government House Leader in the Legislative Assembly of British Columbia
- Deputy Government House Leader (Ontario) in the Legislative Assembly of Ontario
- Deputy Government House Leader in the Newfoundland and Labrador House of Assembly
- Deputy Government House Leader (Quebec) in the National Assembly of Quebec

== India ==
- Deputy Leader of the House in Lok Sabha
- Deputy Leader of the House in Rajya Sabha

== United Kingdom ==
- Deputy Leader of the House of Commons (no formal position, but sometimes used for deputies/assistants)
- Deputy Leader of the House of Lords

== See also ==
- Leader of the House (disambiguation)
- Government House Leader
