= 12th Jatiya Sangsad =

Bangladeshi legislative term, 2024

←	11th Jatiya Sangsad	13th Jatiya Sangsad	→
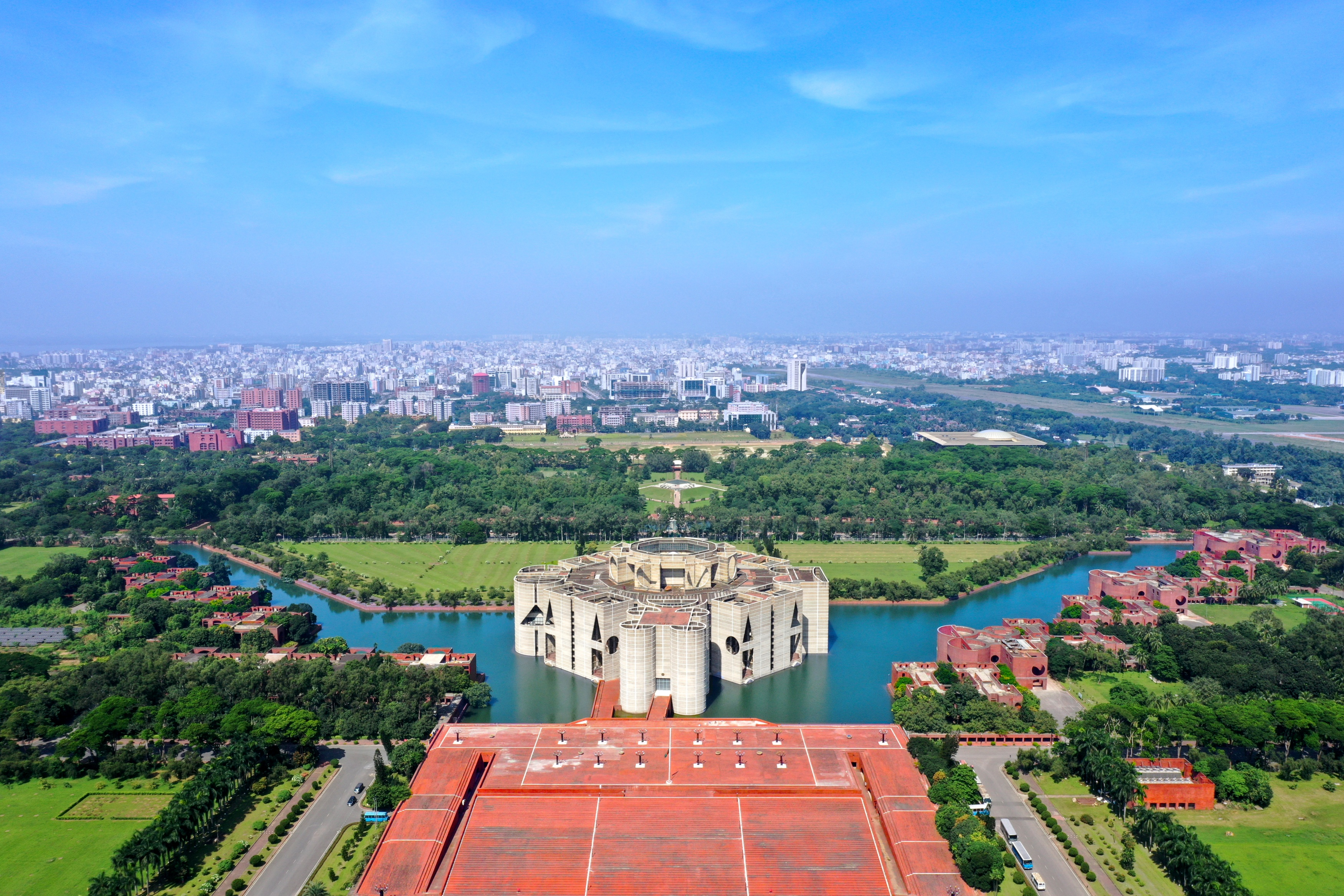
- Jatiya Sangsad Bhaban

Overview
- Legislative body: Bangladesh Parliament
- Term: 30 January 2024 – 6 August 2024
- Election: 2024 Bangladeshi general election
- Government: Fifth Hasina ministry

Sovereign
- President: Mohammed Shahabuddin

House of the Nation
- Members: 350
- Speaker of the House: Shirin Sharmin Chaudhury
- Deputy Speaker of the House: Shamsul Hoque Tuku
- Leader of the House: Sheikh Hasina
- Prime Minister: Sheikh Hasina
- Deputy Leader of the House: Matia Chowdhury
- Chief Whip: Noor-E-Alam Chowdhury Liton
- Leader of the Opposition: Ghulam Muhammed Quader

Sessions
- 1st: 30 January 2024 – 6 August 2024

The Twelfth Jatiya Sangsad (Note: Bengali: দ্বাদশ জাতীয় সংসদ, romanized: Dadôś Jatiẏô Sôṅsôd, pronounced [ˈdadɔʃ ˈdʒati̯oˑ ˈʃɔŋʃɔd]; lit. 'Twelfth National Parliament') was formed with the elected members of the 2024 Bangladeshi general election. The parliament was sworn in on 9 January 2024. On 11 January, the ministers were sworn in. On 30 January, the first session of the parliament took place. Following Prime Minister Sheikh Hasina's resignation and self-imposed exile on 5 August 2024, President Mohammed Shahabuddin dissolved the parliament on 6 August 2024.

Out of the 350 seats, 300 members are directly elected by the people, and the remaining 50 seats are reserved for women and are filled by proportional representation. Awami League won 258 out of the 300 seats and formed the government under the leadership of Sheikh Hasina. The Jatiya Party won 22 seats and became the main opposition party.

== Prominent members ==
Office	Name	Portrait	Term
President	Mohammed Shahabuddin		24 April 2023
Prime Minister	Sheikh Hasina		6 January 2009 – 5 August 2024
Speaker of the Jatiya Sangsad	Shirin Sharmin Chaudhury		1 May 2013 – 2 September 2024 (Note: While Parliament was dissolved on 6 August 2024, Article 74(3) of the Constitution of Bangladesh allows the Speaker to remain in office until a successor is elected. Thus, her tenure officially ended with her resignation on 2 September 2024.)
Chief Justice	Obaidul Hassan		25 September 2023 – 10 August 2024
Chief Election Commissioner	Kazi Habibul Awal		27 February 2022 – 6 August 2024
Chairman of the Bangladesh Public Service Commission	Mohammed Sohrab Hossain		21 September 2020 – 6 August 2024
Chairman of the Anti-Corruption Commission	Mohammad Moinuddin Abdullah		3 March 2021 – 6 August 2024
Comptroller and Auditor General	Mohammad Muslim Chowdhury		17 July 2018 – 16 July 2023
Attorney General	AM Amin Uddin		8 October 2020 – 6 August 2024

== Session ==
=== First ===
On 30 January 2024, the first session of the 12th Jatiya Sangsad was started, and this session ended on 5 March after 22 working days. In the beginning of the session, President Mohammed Sahabuddin addressed the house. 239 members attended the discussion on the presidential address and after 39 hours, a thanking proposal was passed. A total of two bills were passed in this session, and 50 parliamentary committees were formed and 23 reconstructed. According to Rule-71 of the Rules of Procedure of the Bangladesh Parliament, 250 notices were submitted in this session, out of which 15 were accepted and 9 were discussed. Out of 45 questions submitted for the Leader of Parliament. Of the 1,822 questions submitted to the ministers, 1,080 were answered.

=== Second ===
On 2 May 2024, the second session of the 12th Jatiya Sangsad was started, and this session ended on 9 May after 6 working days. One bill was passed in this session. According to Rule-71 of the Rules of Procedure of the Bangladesh Parliament, 242 notices were submitted in this session, out of which 6 were accepted and 4 were discussed. Out of 15 questions submitted for the Leader of Parliament. Of the 902 questions submitted to the ministers, 364 were answered.

=== Third ===
On 5 June 2024, the third session of the 12th Jatiya Sangsad was started, and this session ended on 3 July after 19 working days. On 6 June 2024, Finance Minister Abul Hasan Mahmood Ali presented the national budget proposed Tk 7,97,000 crore; targeted 6.8% GDP growth and 6.5% inflation. A total of seven bills were passed in this session. According to Rule-71 of the Rules of Procedure of the Bangladesh Parliament, 105 notices were submitted in this session. Out of 67 questions submitted for the Leader of Parliament. Of the 2300 questions submitted to the ministers, 1522 were answered.
