= Salim Uddin Tarafder =

Bangladeshi politician

Member of the Bangladesh Parliament for Naogaon-3
- In office 29 January 2014 – 10 January 2024
- Preceded by: Akram Hossain Chowdhury
- Succeeded by: Sourendra Nath Chakraborty

Personal details
- Born: 1 October 1968 (age 57)
- Party: Bangladesh Awami League

Mohd. Salim Uddin Tarafder (born 1 October 1968) is a Bangladesh Awami League politician and a former Jatiya Sangsad member from the Naogaon-3 constituency.

== Career ==
Tarafder was elected to parliament from Naogaon-3 on 5 January 2014 as a Bangladesh Awami League candidate.
