= Mohammad Mahbubuzzaman =

Bangladeshi politician

Mohammad Mahbubuzzaman was a Bangladeshi bureaucrat, Cabinet Secretary, and government minister.

== Early life ==
Mahbubuzzaman was born on 25 November 1929 in Rajshahi, Rajshahi District, East Bengal, British India. He graduated from Rajshahi Loknath High School. He studied at Tejgaon Agriculture College and worked as the superintendent of Dhaka Farms.

== Career ==
In 1954, Mahbubuzzaman joined the Pakistan Civil Service. He served as the sub-divisional officer of Nilphamari District. He served as the deputy commissioner of Rangpur District. He has served as the registrar of the Department of Cooperatives.

Mahbubuzzaman is a former chairman of the Bangladesh Tea Board. He was the second person to become secretary at the Ministry of Public Administration. He went on to become secretary of the Ministry of Home Affairs. On 24 November 1986, he retired from the civil service.

Following the death of the member of parliament of Naogaon-3, Mohammad Baitullah, Mahbubuzzaman contested the following by-election and was elected to parliament.

Mahbubuzzaman was the cabinet secretary of during the government of General Hussain Mohammad Ershad. He joined the cabinet of Ershad after retiring from government service, as a minister. He served as the Minister of Agriculture from 1988 to 1990.

In the 1990s, Mahbubuzzaman was the first chairman of Social Marketing Company and chairman of Aziz and Company. He was a member of the Retired Government Employees Welfare Association and Bangladesh Medical Studies and Research Institute.

== Personal life ==
Mahbubuzzaman has two sons. His eldest son, Colonel Mohammad Anisuzzaman, was the Bangladesh Rifles Mymensingh Sector Commander. His younger son, Md. Ahsan-uz Zaman, currently based in the United States, previously served as the Managing Director & CEO of Midland Bank PLC in Bangladesh and chaired Midland Asset Management Ltd. He also held executive positions across private Commercial banks in Bangladesh and previously worked in JPMorgan Chase Bank and Bank of America.Colonel Mohammad Anisuzzaman was killed in the 2009 Bangladesh Rifles Mutiny.

== Death ==
Mahbubuzzaman died on 3 March 2008. He was buried in Banani military graveyard. In 2009, Prime Minister Sheikh Hasina awarded him Krishibid award posthumously. A neighborhood of his village was named after him and Sapahar Zaman Nagar Girls High School was founded after his name.
