= Bangladesh Parliament Secretariat =

Government department

- বাংলাদেশ সংসদ সচিবালয়
- Emblem of Jatiya Sangsad

- Flag of the Jatiya Sangsad

Secretariat overview
- Formed: 1972; 54 years ago
- Jurisdiction: Bangladesh
- Headquarters: Jatiya Sangsad Bhaban, Dhaka, Bangladesh
- Presiding officer responsible: Hafiz Uddin Ahmad, Speaker
- Deputy Presiding officer responsible: Kayser Kamal, Deputy Speaker
- Secretariat executive: Md. Golam Sorwar Bhuiyan, Secretary
- Parent department: Parliament of Bangladesh
- Child agencies: Senate; House of the Nation
- Website: www.parliament.gov.bd

Bangladesh Parliament Secretariat (Bengali: বাংলাদেশ সংসদ সচিবালয়, romanized: Bānlādeś Saṅsad Sôchibāloy) is a department of the Government of Bangladesh responsible for providing administrative and secretarial support to the Parliament and its legislative activities. It is situated within the Parliament of Bangladesh.

Parliament Secretariat is responsible for organizing the oath taking ceremony of members of parliament. It provides information on activities of the parliament to the press through the Public Relation Department. It allocates development and travel budgets to members of parliament.

== History ==
Speaker Mohammad Abdul Hamid created an all-party parliamentary body to investigate corruption by staff of the Parliament Secretariat in March 2009. He also had the Comptroller and Auditor General go through all expenditures of the Parliament Secretariat since 1972.

In November 2011, the secretariat organized a discussion on population with United Nations Population Fund at the Parliamentary Member's Club. Distinguished Fellow at the Centre for Policy Dialogue Rounaq Jahan described the secretariat in 2012 as understaffed and underfunded while being relatively weak. She called for it to be strenghted and provided with a permanent staff. It build fences around the parliament in 2015, which drew criticism for undermining the architecture of the parliament.

The Parliament Secretariat Commission approved 3.28 billion BDT budget in May 2019 for members of parliament to spend. It published Parliamentary Practice and Procedure by Khandaker Abdul Haque, an expert on parliamentary affairs.

In 2020, the parliamentary session had to be stopped after around 100 employees of the Bangladesh Parliament Secretariat were infected with COVID-19 at the start of the COVID-19 pandemic in Bangladesh. In 2022, it returned 800 million BDT to the government treasury; the money was saved due to fewer working days during the pandemic.

In 2021, the Secretariate disqualified Mohammad Shahid Islam as a member of parliament after he was convicted of a crime in Kuwait.

== List of secretaries ==
Secretaries and Senior Secretaries
#	Name	Position	Term Began	Term Ended
1	S.M. Rahman	Secretary	21 January 1972	14 December 1975
2	A.S. Nur Mohammad	Secretary	14 December 1975	19 January 1976
3	Abdul Momen Khan	Secretary	23 January 1976	14 July 1976
4	Abdul Khalek	Secretary	27 October 1978	20 March 1979
5	Kazi Jalal Uddin Ahmed	Secretary	20 March 1979	18 April 1982
6	S.S.M. Lutful Haque	Secretary	19 April 1982	28 February 1983
7	Hossain Ahmed	Secretary	21 March 1983	27 January 1985
8	K.G.M. Latiful Bari	Secretary	27 January 1985	02 November 1985
9	Khandakar Asaduzzaman	Secretary	02 November 1985	17 June 1986
10	Kazi Jalal Uddin Ahmed	Secretary	17 June 1986	13 May 1987
11	Md. Ayubur Rahman	Secretary	13 May 1987	04 August 1990
12	Abdul Awal	Secretary	04 August 1990	21 July 1991
13	Abul Hashem	Secretary	21 July 1991	14 August 1997
14	Kazi Muhammad Monjoor E Maula	Secretary	11 September 1997	30 September 2000
15	Kazi Rakibuddin Ahmed	Secretary	26 November 2000	30 November 2003
16	Khandakar Fazlur Rahman	Secretary	03 December 2003	31 December 2004
17	Dr. Md. Omar Faruq Khan	Secretary	04 January 2005	24 July 2005
18	Mohammad Lutfur Rahman Talukdar	Secretary	31 July 2005	03 April 2006
19	Ehsan Ul Fattah	Secretary	12 April 2006	12 July 2006
20	A.T.M. Ataur Rahman	Secretary	12 July 2006	27 February 2008
21	Asfaq Hamid	Secretary	27 February 2008	22 September 2011
22	Md. Mahfuzur Rahman	Secretary	13 October 2011	25 September 2013
23	Md. Ashraful Mokbul	Secretary	25 September 2013	31 December 2015
24	Dr. Md. Abdur Rob Hawladar	Senior Secretary	13 January 2016	25 November 2018
25	Dr. Zafar Ahmed Khan	Senior Secretary	14 November 2018	24 July 2021
26	K.M. Abdus Salam	Secretary	28 July 2021	30 December 2022
27	K.M. Abdus Salam	Senior Secretary	31 December 2022	14 August 2024
28	Dr. Md. Anwar Ullah, FCMA	Secretary	15 September 2024	31 December 2024
29	Md. Mizanur Rahman ndc	Secretary	27 February 2025	16 June 2025
30	Kaniz Moula	Secretary	15 July 2025	28 March 2026
31	Md. Golam Sorwar Bhuiyan	Secretary	29 March 2026	present
