= Naogaon-3 =

Constituency of Bangladesh's Jatiya Sangsad

Coordinates: 24.92°N 88.75°E

- Constituency for the Jatiya Sangsad
- District: Naogaon District
- Division: Rajshahi Division
- Electorate: 382,536 (2018)

Current constituency
- Created: 1984
- Party: Bangladesh Nationalist Party
- Member: Md. Fazley Houda
- ← Naogaon-2 Naogaon-4 →

Naogaon-3 is a constituency represented in the Jatiya Sangsad (National Parliament) of Bangladesh since 2026 by Md. Fazley Houda of the Bangladesh Nationalist Party.

== Boundaries ==
The constituency encompasses Badalgachhi and Mahadebpur upazilas.

== History ==
The constituency was created in 1984 from a Rajshahi constituency when the former Rajshahi District was split into four districts: Nawabganj, Naogaon, Rajshahi, and Natore.

== Members of Parliament ==
Election	Member	Party
1986	Mohammad Baitullah	Awami League
1988	Md. Suzauddaulah	Jatiya Party
1991	Akhtar Hameed Siddiqui	Bangladesh Nationalist Party
1996	Akhtar Hameed Siddiqui	Bangladesh Nationalist Party
2001	Akhtar Hameed Siddiqui	Bangladesh Nationalist Party
2008	Akram Hossain Chowdhury	Awami League
2014	Salim Uddin Tarafder	Independent
2018	Salim Uddin Tarafder	Awami League
2024	Sourendra Nath Chakraborty	Awami League
2026	Md. Fazley Houda	Bangladesh Nationalist Party

== Elections ==
=== Elections in the 2020s ===
General election 2026: Naogaon-3
Party	Candidate	Votes	%	±%
BNP	Fazley Huda Babul	165,646		
Jamaat	Md Mahfuzur Rahman	117,838		
BSD	Kalipada Sarkar			
IAB	Nasir Bin Asgar			
Independent	Parvez Arefin Siddique			
JP(E)	Md Masud Rana			
BNF	Abdullah Al Mamun Saikat			
Independent	Md Saddam Hossain			
Majority		48,268		
Turnout				

=== Elections in the 2010s ===
General Election 2014: Naogaon-3
Party	Candidate	Votes	%	±%
Independent	Salim Uddin Tarafder	74,040	61.2	N/A
AL	Akram Hossain Chowdhury	46,863	38.8	−21.2
Majority		27,177	22.5	+1.8
Turnout		120,903	34.7	−59.3
Independent gain from AL				

=== Elections in the 2000s ===
General Election 2008: Naogaon-3
Party	Candidate	Votes	%	±%
AL	Akram Hossain Chowdhury	176,562	60.0	+15.6
BNP	Akhtar Hameed Siddiqui	115,740	39.3	−14.8
BDB	Sultan Mamunur Rashid	1,140	0.4	N/A
BSD	Joynal Abedin Mokul	784	0.3	N/A
Majority		60,822	20.7	+11.0
Turnout		294,226	94.0	+5.9
AL gain from BNP				

General Election 2001: Naogaon-3
Party	Candidate	Votes	%	±%
BNP	Akhtar Hameed Siddiqui	135,250	54.1	+14.5
AL	Akram Hossain Chowdhury	110,927	44.4	−7.4
IJOF	Tayeb Uddin Ahmed	3,624	1.4	N/A
Bangladesh Samajtantrik Dal (Basad-Khalekuzzaman)	Joynal Abedin Mokul	217	0.1	N/A
Majority		24,323	9.7	−2.4
Turnout		250,018	88.1	+2.7
BNP hold				

=== Elections in the 1990s ===
General Election June 1996: Naogaon-3
Party	Candidate	Votes	%	±%
BNP	Akhtar Hameed Siddiqui	105,225	51.8	+1.1
AL	Dewan Amzad Hossain Tara	80,536	39.6	+1.2
JP(E)	Tayeb Uddin Ahmed	7,973	3.9	+3.2
Jamaat	Md. Abul Kalam Azad	7,914	3.9	−5.3
IOJ	Md. Abdul Hamid Sordar	1,036	0.5	N/A
Jatiya Janata Party (Asad)	Begom Rokeya Firoj	315	0.2	N/A
Zaker Party	Md. Abdullah Al Mahmud	149	0.1	N/A
FP	Md. Harunur Rasid	75	0.0	N/A
Majority		24,689	12.1	−0.2
Turnout		203,223	85.4	+13.8
BNP hold				

General Election 1991: Naogaon-3
Party	Candidate	Votes	%	±%
BNP	Akhtar Hameed Siddiqui	85,785	50.7	
AL	Abdul Jalil	64,966	38.4	
Jamaat	Md. Hafez Uddin Mondol	15,538	9.2	
JP(E)	Md. Suzauddaulah	1,240	0.7	
NAP (Muzaffar)	Md. Nafar Mondol	659	0.4	
Independent	Md. Gazim Uddin	576	0.3	
Bangladesh Muslim League (Aian Uddin)	Md. Sahzahan Sarker	287	0.2	
Jatiya Samajtantrik Dal-JSD	Md. Harun Ur Rashid Daptari	214	0.1	
Majority		20,819	12.3	
Turnout		169,265	71.6	
BNP gain from JP(E)				
