= Akram Hossain Chowdhury =

Bangladeshi politician (1955–2023)

- আকরাম হোসেন চৌধুরী
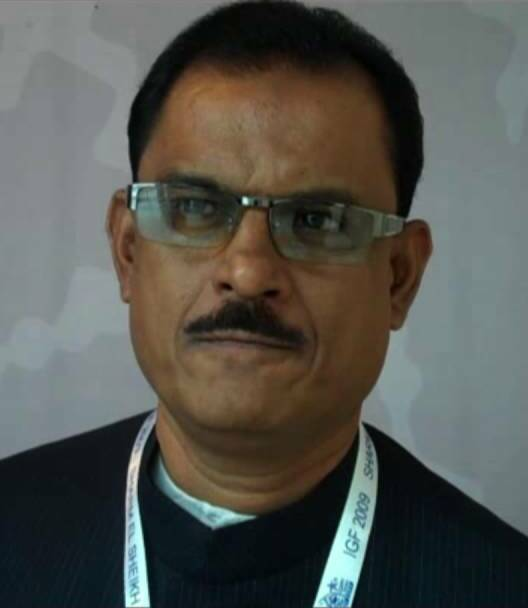

Member of the Bangladesh Parliament for Naogaon-3
- In office 6 January 2009 – 24 January 2014
- Preceded by: Akhtar Hameed Siddiqui
- Succeeded by: Salim Uddin Tarafder

Personal details
- Died: 13 November 2023 (aged 68) Naogaon, Bangladesh
- Party: Bangladesh Awami League

Akram Hossain Chowdhury (1954/1955 – 13 November 2023) was a Bangladesh Awami League politician who served as a Jatiya Sangsad member representing the Naogaon-3 constituency during 2009–2014.

== Life and career ==
Chowdhury was elected to Parliament from Naogaon-3 in 2008 as a Bangladesh Awami League candidate.

Chowdhury died in Naogaon on 13 November 2023, at the age of 68.
