= Chief Whip of the Opposition in Jatiya Sangsad =

Chief Whip of the Opposition of Jatiya Sangsad
- জাতীয় সংসদের বিরোধীদলীয় চিফ হুইপ
- Emblem of the Jatiya Sangsad

- Flag of the Jatiya Sangsad

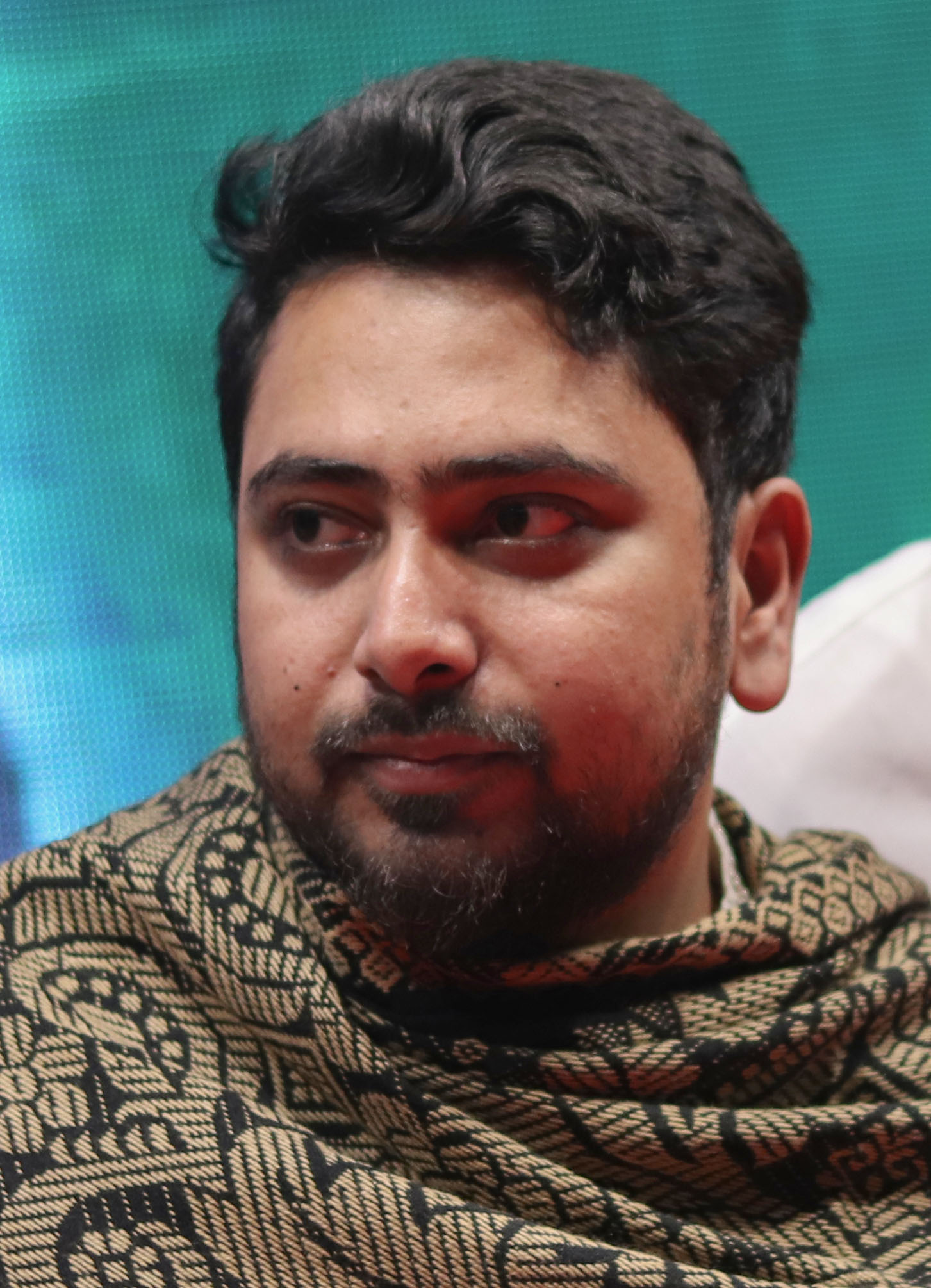
- Incumbent; Nahid Islam since 17 February 2026
- House of the Nation
- Style: The Honorable (formal); His/Her Excellency (diplomatic)
- Abbreviation: OCWOP
- Member of: Shadow Cabinet; Parliament
- Reports to: Speaker; Parliament
- Seat: Jatiya Sangsad Bhaban, Dhaka, Bangladesh
- Appointer: President of Bangladesh; on the advice of the All Member of Parliament
- Term length: 5 years; renewable
- Constituting instrument: Article 65 of the Constitution of Bangladesh
- Inaugural holder: Lutfor Rahman
- Formation: 18 April 1979
- Salary: ৳172800 (US$1,400) per month (incl. allowances)
- Website: parliament.gov.bd

The Chief Whip of the Opposition of Jatiya Sangsad (Bengali: জাতীয় সংসদের বিরোধীদলীয় চিফ হুইপ) is a member of the Jatiya Sangsad who is appointed by the largest opposition party in parliament. The Opposition Chief Whip is responsible for maintaining discipline among opposition MPs, coordinating their participation in debates and votes, and ensuring that members follow party instructions during parliamentary proceedings.

The position did not exist in the First (1973–1975) and Sixth (1996) National Assemblies of Bangladesh. The first Opposition Chief Whip was appointed during the Second Parliament (1979–1982), with Lutfor Rahman serving as the inaugural officeholder.

The rank and protocol of the Opposition Chief Whip is equivalent to a Minister of State in the government, though the position is purely parliamentary and does not hold executive authority.

== List of Opposition Chief Whips ==
Political parties

- Bangladesh Awami League
- Bangladesh Nationalist Party
- Jatiya Party
- Jatiya Samajtantrik Dal
- National Citizen Party

Legislature	Officeholder	Portrait	Tenure		Party
1	Lutfor Rahman		18 April 1979	24 March 1982	Bangladesh Awami League
2nd	Abdul Jalil		9 July 1986	6 December 1987	Bangladesh Awami League
3	Nur Alam Ziku		27 March 1988	6 December 1990	Jatiya Samajtantrik Dal
4	Mohammad Nasim		20 March 1991	28 December 1994 (Resigned)	Bangladesh Awami League
5	Khandaker Delwar Hossain		12 June 1996	15 July 2001	Bangladesh Nationalist Party
6	Abdus Shahid		1 October 2001	29 October 2006	Bangladesh Awami League
7	Zainul Abdin Farroque		29 December 2009	9 January 2014	Bangladesh Nationalist Party
8	Tajul Islam Chowdhury		9 January 2009	13 August 2018	Jatiya Party (Ershad)
8	Nurul Islam Omar9		20 September 2018	30 January 2019	Jatiya Party (Ershad)
10	Mashiur Rahaman Ranga		30 January 2019	7 January 2024	Jatiya Party (Ershad)
11	Mujibul Haque		30 January 2024	6 August 2024	Jatiya Party (Ershad)
12	Nahid Islam		17 February 2026	Incumbent	National Citizen Party
