= Deputy Leader of the House in Jatiya Sangsad =

Post in the National Parliament of Bangladesh

Deputy Leader of the House of Jatiya Sangsad
- জাতীয় সংসদের উপনেতা
- Emblem of the Jatiya Sangsad

- Flag of the Jatiya Sangsad
- House of the Nation
- Style: The Honorable (formal); His/Her Excellency (diplomatic)
- Member of: Cabinet; Parliament
- Reports to: Speaker; Parliament
- Seat: Jatiya Sangsad Bhaban, Dhaka, Bangladesh
- Appointer: All MPs of the majority party
- Term length: 5 years
- Constituting instrument: Article 65 of Constitution of Bangladesh
- Inaugural holder: Syed Nazrul Islam
- Formation: 12 January 1972 (54 years ago)
- Salary: ৳172800 (US$1,400) per month (incl. allowances)
- Website: parliament.gov.bd

The Deputy Leader of the House of Jatiya Sangsad (Bengali: জাতীয় সংসদের উপনেতা) is the deputy to the Leader of the House in the National Parliament of Bangladesh. The position is usually held by a senior member of the ruling party and is appointed by the Prime Minister of Bangladesh, who serves as the Leader of the House. The Deputy Leader assists the Leader of the House in managing government business in parliament and may preside over parliamentary proceedings or represent the government in the absence of the Leader of the House.

The position of Deputy Leader holds the same rank as a Cabinet Minister.

== List of Deputy Leaders of Parliament ==
Political parties

- Bangladesh Awami League
- Bangladesh Nationalist Party
- Jatiya Party

Parliament	Name (Date of birth)	Image	Term		Party
1st	Syed Nazrul Islam (1925–1975)		7 April 1973	25 January 1975	Bangladesh Awami League
2nd	Moudud Ahmed (1940–2021)		15 April 1979	24 March 1982 (Removed from office)	Bangladesh Nationalist Party
3rd	Kazi Zafar Ahmed (1939–2015)		9 July 1986	6 December 1987	Jatiya Party (Ershad)
4th	Kazi Zafar Ahmed (1939–2015)		27 March 1988	12 August 1989	Jatiya Party (Ershad)
4th	Shah Moazzem Hossain (1939–2022)		12 August 1989	6 December 1990	Jatiya Party (Ershad)
5th	A.Q.M. Badruddoza Chowdhury (1932–2024)		20 March 1991	24 November 1995	Bangladesh Nationalist Party
6th	A.Q.M. Badruddoza Chowdhury (1932–2024)		19 March 1996	30 March 1996	Bangladesh Nationalist Party
7th	Zillur Rahman (1929–2013)		23 June 1996	15 July 2001	Bangladesh Awami League
8th	A.Q.M. Badruddoza Chowdhury (1932–2024)		10 October 2001	14 November 2001	Bangladesh Nationalist Party
9th	Zillur Rahman (1929–2013)		06 January 2009	12 February 2009	Bangladesh Awami League
9th	Syeda Sajeda Chowdhury (1935–2022)		12 February 2009	24 January 2014	Bangladesh Awami League
10th	Syeda Sajeda Chowdhury (1935–2022)		29 January 2014	30 January 2019	Bangladesh Awami League
11th	Syeda Sajeda Chowdhury (1935–2022)		11 February 2019	11 September 2022	Bangladesh Awami League
11th	Matia Chowdhury (1942–2024)		12 January 2023	6 August 2024	Bangladesh Awami League
12th	Matia Chowdhury (1942–2024)		12 January 2023	6 August 2024	Bangladesh Awami League
