= Leader of the House in Jatiya Sangsad =

Office held by the Prime Minister of Bangladesh

Leader of the House of Jatiya Sangsad
- জাতীয় সংসদের নেতা
- Emblem of the Jatiya Sangsad

- Flag of the Jatiya Sangsad

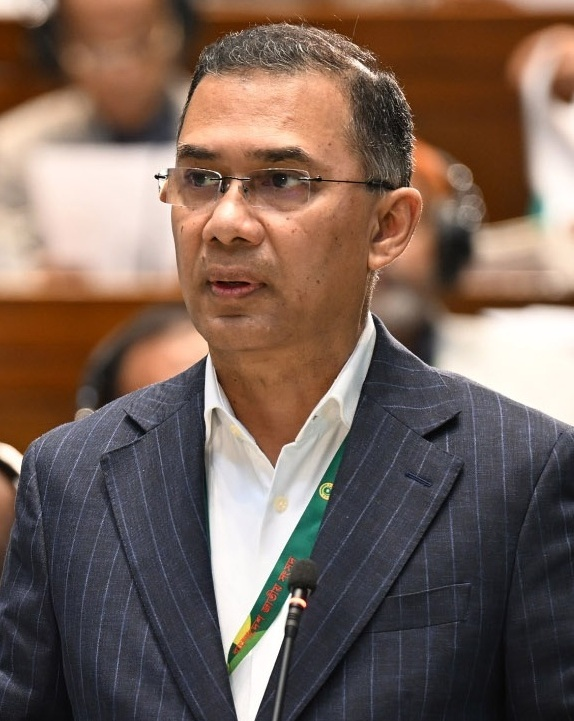
- Incumbent; Tarique Rahman since 17 February 2026
- House of the Nation
- Style: The Honorable (formal); His/Her Excellency (diplomatic)
- Member of: Cabinet; Parliament
- Reports to: Speaker; Parliament
- Residence: 196, Gulshan Avenue, Dhaka
- Seat: Jatiya Sangsad Bhaban
- Appointer: All MPs of the majority party
- Term length: 5 years
- Constituting instrument: Article 65 of Constitution of Bangladesh
- Inaugural holder: Sheikh Mujibur Rahman
- Formation: 12 January 1972 (54 years ago)
- Deputy: Deputy Leader of the House
- Salary: ৳172800 (US$1,400) per month (incl. allowances)
- Website: parliament.gov.bd

The Leader of the House of Jatiya Sangsad (Bengali: জাতীয় সংসদের নেতা – ’‘Shôngshôd nētā’’) is the leader responsible for managing and coordinating government business in the National Parliament of Bangladesh. By convention, the office is held by the Prime Minister of Bangladesh, who leads the majority party or coalition in parliament.

The Leader of the House determines the scheduling of government legislation, represents the government in parliamentary proceedings, and coordinates with the Chief Whip and other parliamentary leaders to ensure the smooth conduct of business in the House.

The Deputy Leader of the House assists the Leader in carrying out these responsibilities and may act as the Leader of the House during the Leader’s absence. The Leader and Deputy Leader are recognized positions within parliament, generally held by senior members of the ruling party.

== List of Leaders of the House ==
Political parties

- Bangladesh Awami League
- Bangladesh Nationalist Party
- Bangladesh Krishak Sramik Awami League
- Jatiya Party (Ershad)

No.	Name (Birth–Death)	Portrait	Term of office		Party
1	Sheikh Mujibur Rahman (1920–1975)		12 January 1972	25 January 1975	Bangladesh Awami League
2	Muhammad Mansur Ali (1919–1975)		25 January 1975	15 August 1975 (Deposed)	Bangladesh Krishak Sramik Awami League
3	Shah Azizur Rahman (1925–1988)		15 April 1979	24 March 1982 (Deposed)	Bangladesh Nationalist Party
4	Mizanur Rahman Chowdhury (1928–2006)		9 July 1986	27 March 1988	Jatiya Party (Ershad)
5	Moudud Ahmed (1940–2021)		27 March 1988	12 August 1989	Jatiya Party (Ershad)
6	Kazi Zafar Ahmed (1939–2015)		12 August 1989	6 December 1990	Jatiya Party (Ershad)
7	Khaleda Zia (1945–2025)		20 March 1991	30 March 1996	Bangladesh Nationalist Party
8	Sheikh Hasina (1947–)		23 June 1996	15 July 2001	Bangladesh Awami League
(7)	Khaleda Zia (1945–2025)		10 October 2001	29 October 2006	Bangladesh Nationalist Party
(8)	Sheikh Hasina (1947–)		6 January 2009	5 August 2024	Bangladesh Awami League
9	Tarique Rahman (1965–)		17 February 2026	Incumbent	Bangladesh Nationalist Party

== See also ==
- Leader of the Opposition (Bangladesh)
