= Md. Suzauddaulah =

Politician from Bangladesh

Member of Bangladesh Parliament
- In office 1988–1991
- Preceded by: Mohammad Baitullah
- Succeeded by: Akhtar Hameed Siddiqui

Personal details
- Party: Jatiya Party (Ershad)

Md. Suzauddaulah is a Jatiya Party (Ershad) politician in Bangladesh and a former member of parliament for Naogaon-3.

== Career ==
Suzauddaulah was elected to parliament from Naogaon-3 as a Jatiya Party candidate in 1988.
