= Akhtar Hameed Siddiqui =

Bangladeshi politician (1947–2017)

Akhtar Hamid Siddiqui
- আখতার হামিদ সিদ্দিকী
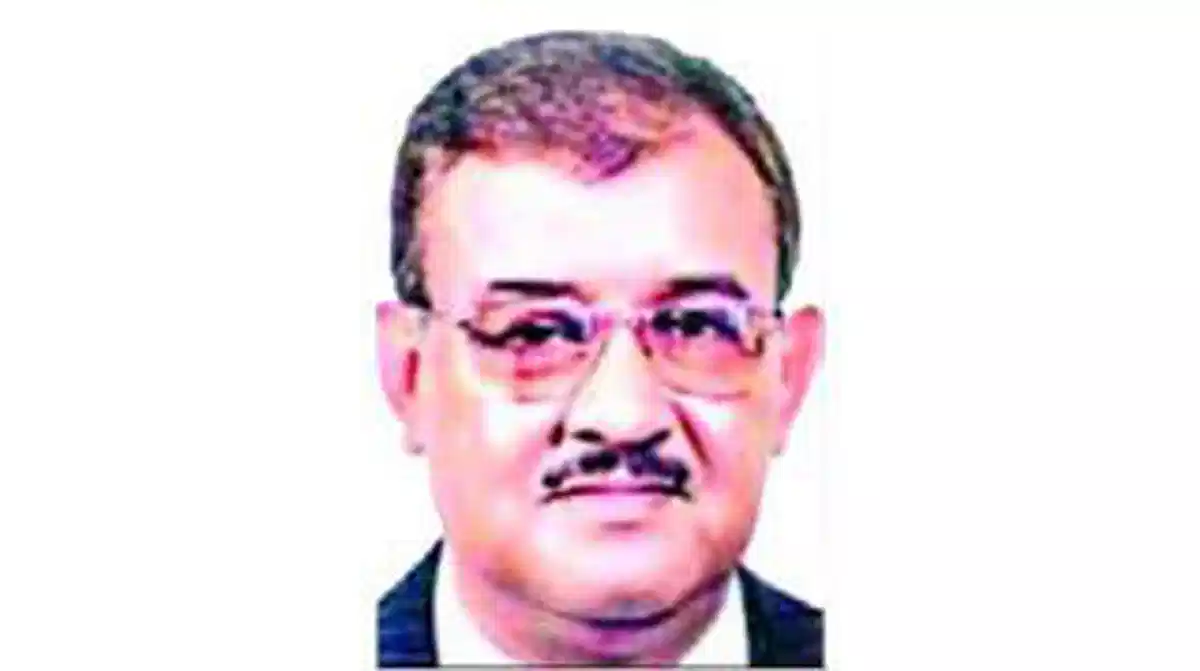

10th Deputy Speaker of Jatiya Sangsad
- In office 28 October 2001 – 25 January 2009
- Speaker: Jamiruddin Sircar
- Preceded by: Ali Ashraf
- Succeeded by: Shawkat Ali

Member of Jatiya Sangsad
- In office 1991–2006
- Preceded by: Md. Suzauddaulah
- Succeeded by: Akram Hossain Chowdhury
- Constituency: Naogaon-3

Personal details
- Born: 1947 Naogaon
- Died: 19 November 2017 (aged 69–70) Dhaka, Bangladesh
- Party: Bangladesh Nationalist Party
- Education: University of Dhaka

Akhtar Hamid Siddiqui (1947 – 19 November 2017) was a Bangladesh Nationalist Party politician who served as the Deputy Speaker of the 8th Jatiya Sangsad. He was elected to the parliament from the Naogaon-3 constituency in four consecutive elections from 1991 to 2001. He was also appointed as an Advisor to BNP Chairperson in 2016.
