= Social Marketing Company =

Bangladeshi non-profit organisation

- Company type: Nonprofit PLC
- Founded: 1974 in Dhaka, Bangladesh
- Headquarters: Dhaka, Bangladesh
- Key people: Siddiqur Rahman Choudhury (Chairman)
- Website: smc-bd.org

Social Marketing Company (aka SMC) is a Bangladeshi non-profit organisation which offers education and products for family planning, maternal and child health, and prevention of sexually transmitted diseases (STD) and AIDS. It is the largest social marketing company in Bangladesh.

== Early history ==
The Social Marketing Project was initiated in 1974 when AI.D./Washington, at the request of the Government of Bangladesh, contracted for a two-year program to distribute non-clinical contraceptives throughout the country. A sole-source contract was awarded to Population Services International (PSI), which then signed an agreement with the Government of Bangladesh establishing the activity as a parasternal one, with a project council serving as the board of directors. In 1990, it became a company governed by a board of directors made out of volunteers. AKM Shamsuddin was the founding managing director of the company. Mohammad Mahbubuzzaman was the founding chairman of the company. The council was chaired by the secretary of Health and Family Planning and contained representatives of the government, the private sector, and the international non-profit sector.

Social Marketing Company created SMC Enterprise Limited as a for profit venture in 2014. The SMC Enterprise Limited will distribute the products of Social Marketing Company funnel profits to the Social Marketing Company. It runs awareness programs on menstrual health.

Toslim Uddin Khan was appointed acting managing director of Social Marketing Company in September 2022.

== Board of directors ==
Name	Profession	Position	Reference
Waliul Islam	Civil servant	Chairman	
Muhammad Ali	Civil servant	Director	
Md. Siddique Ullah	Civil servant	Director	
Aftab ul Islam	Businessman	Director	
Muhammed Farhad Hussain	Banker	Director	
Farhana Dewan	Gynecologist	Director	
Jahir Uddin Ahmed	Civil servant	Director	
Yasmin Hemayet Ahmed	Non-profit administrator	Director	
Ahmed Mushtaque Raza Chowdhury	Academic	Director	
Toslim Uddin Khan	Company official	Managing Director of Social Marketing Company	
Abdul Haque	Company official	Managing Director of SMC Enterprise Limited	

== Products ==
SMC markets a variety of non-clinical (oral pills- Femicon, Minicon, Norette-28,Femipil,Ovacon Gold, Mypil, SmartPill & SmartPill Light and condoms – Raja, HERO, Panther, Sensation,U&ME,Xtreme & Amore) and clinical (Injectable "SOMA-JECT" & Sayena Press) contraceptives.

The WHO-formula based packaged oral rehydration salt brand marketed by SMC is ORSaline-N. SMC extended its line of oral rehydration salt by introducing BNF – based flavored ORS brand 'ORSaline Fruity' in August 2003. It produced 60 percent of the oral saline in the Bangladeshi market in 2008.

In May 2008, SMC introduced a small sachet of micronutrient powder, popularly known as 'Sprinkles", in the brand name of "MoniMix" to address childhood Iron deficiency anemia (IDA). It also started marketing Zinc dispersible tablets in September 2008 to reduce the severity of diarrhea in children under 5. As part of its maternal and neonatal health programme, SMC launched Safe Delivery Kit branded as "Safety Kit" in 2008 to ensure clean child delivery at a household level.

=== Condoms (brand) ===
Brand	Product	Launch
Raja	Plain Latex condom	1974
Sensation	Classic; Chocolate; Strawberry	1992
Panther	Dotted latex condom	1983
U&ME	Colors; Long love Anatomic	2005
Hero	Plain latex condom	2006
Xtreme	3 in 1 Ultra Thin	2014
Amore	Gold; Black	2017

== Sales network ==
More than 100 men-strong sales force of SMC distribute products to the far-flung stockist and retail outlets promptly and regularly.

SMC covers more than 240,000 outlets each year directly through its sales network. In addition, numerous other retailers take supplies from the stockists.

== See also ==
- Essential Drugs Company- a state owned drug company.
