= Md Korban Ali =

Bangladeshi politician (1924–1990)

3rd Deputy Speaker of Jatiya Sangsad
- In office 10 July 1986 – 24 April 1988
- Speaker: Shamsul Huda Chowdhury
- Preceded by: Sultan Ahmed
- Succeeded by: Md. Reazuddin Ahmed

Personal details
- Born: 1924 Kandipara, Lohajang, Munshiganj
- Died: 23 July 1990 (aged 65–66) Dhaka, Bangladesh
- Party: Bangladesh Awami League
- Spouse(s): Rasheda Begum & Hamida Begum
- Children: 9

Md Korban Ali (1924 – 23 July 1990) was a Bangladesh Awami League politician and the former deputy Speaker of Parliament.

== Early life ==
Md Korban Ali was born on 28 January 1924 at Kandipara, Lohajang, Munshiganj. In 1947 hr graduated from Dhaka University with a masters in Economics and 1950 completed his law degree there. After which he joined the Dhaka district bar.

== Career ==
In 1950 he joined the Awami Muslim League. He had been active in the Bengali language movement. From 1953 to 1955 he was the organizing secretary of the central committee of Awami League. He served as the president of Dhaka district Awami League from 1954 to 1958.In 1954 he was elected to the East Bengal Legislative Assembly from the United Front. From 1955 to 1958 he was deputy chief whip of the Provincial Assembly. He was active in the Six point movement and Mass Uprising Day of 1969. He was the chief of the election monitoring and publicity cell of Awami League in the general elections of 1970.

At the start of Bangladesh Liberation war he crossed into India. He served as the political adviser to the Acting President of the Mujibnagar Government. From 1972 to 1974 he was the senior vice president of Bangladesh Awami League. In 1973 he was elected to parliament. In 1975 he was made the Minister of Information and Broadcasting. he was a central member of Bangladesh Krishak Sramik Awami League He was jailed for two years after the assassination of Sheikh Mujibur Rahman on 15 August 1975. In 1979 he lost a parliamentary election. In 1981 he was elected to the Awami League presidium council. He joined the cabinet of Hussain Mohammad Ershad as the Minister of Jute and Textile and later he was the Minister of Public Works and Urban Development.

== Death ==
On 23 July 1990 he died in Dhaka, Bangladesh.

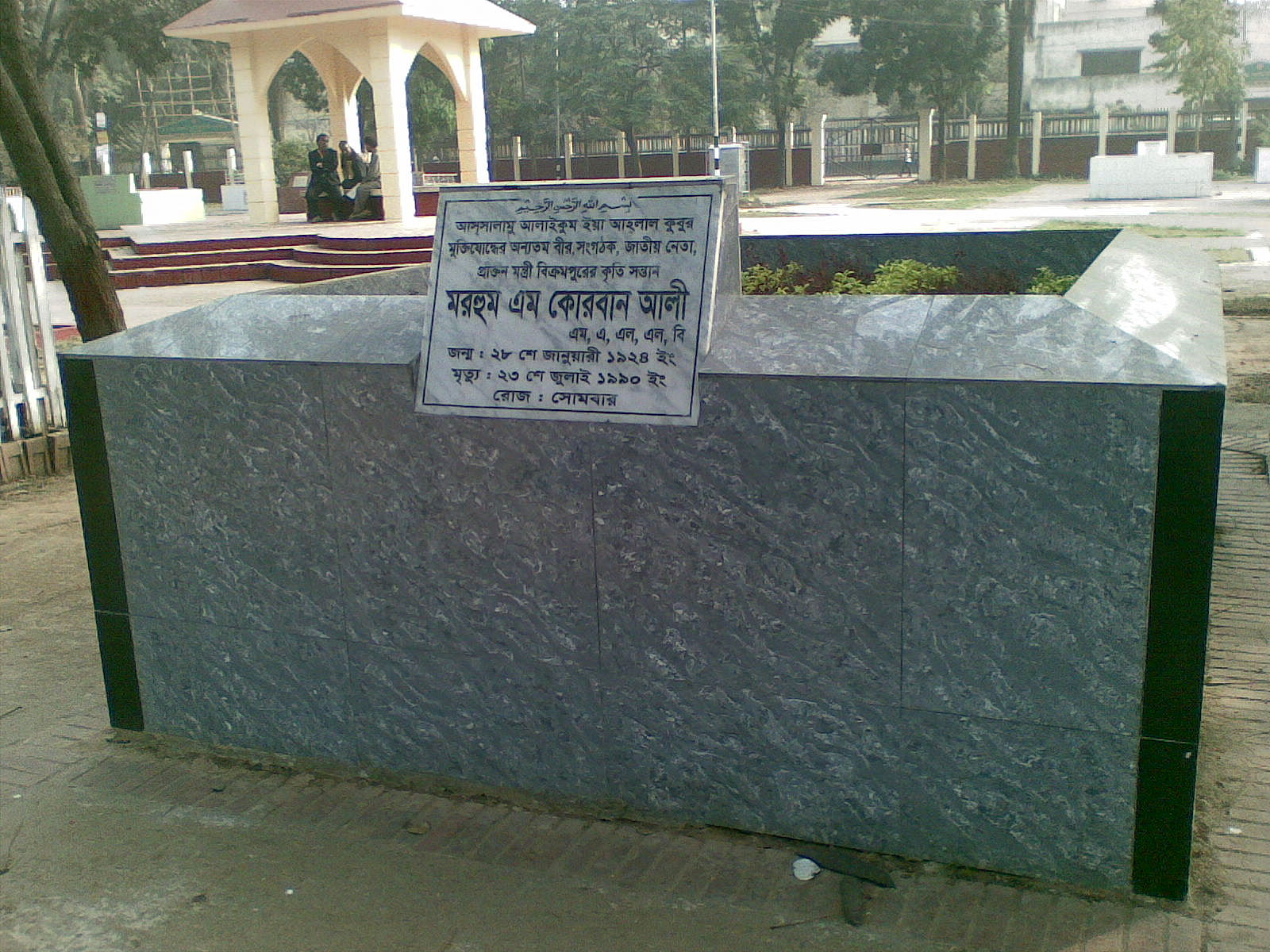
Grave of Ali in Martyred Intellectuals Graveyard, Mirpur
