= Mohammad Baitullah =

Bangleshi politician (1927–1987)

Deputy Speaker of the Jatiya Sangsad
- In office 7 March 1973 – 6 November 1975
- Preceded by: position established
- Succeeded by: Sultan Ahmed

Deputy Speaker of Constituent Assembly of Bangladesh
- In office 1 May 1972 – 16 December 1972
- Preceded by: Mohammad Mohammadullah
- Succeeded by: position abolished

Member of Parliament
- In office 7 May 1986 – 9 March 1987
- Preceded by: Position Established
- Succeeded by: Md. Suzauddaulah
- Constituency: Naogaon-3
- In office 7 March 1973 – 6 November 1975
- Preceded by: Position Established
- Succeeded by: Chowdhury Motahar Hossain
- Constituency: Rajshahi-9

Member of Constituent Assembly of Bangladesh
- In office 10 April 1972 – 16 December 1972
- Preceded by: Position Established
- Succeeded by: Position Abolished
- Constituency: Rajshahi-3

Personal details
- Born: 2 February 1927 Shalebaj, Naogaon
- Died: 9 March 1987 (aged 60)
- Party: Bangladesh Awami League

Mohammad Baitullah (2 February 1927 – 9 March 1987) was a Bangladesh Awami League politician and the former deputy Speaker of Parliament.

== Early life ==
He was born on 2 February 1927 at Shalebaj, Naogaon. In 1943 he graduated from Paharpur High School. He finished undergraduate studies from Rajshahi College in 1947. He went to graduate school and law school in Dhaka University.

== Career ==
He served from 1952 to 1953 as the headmaster of Kirtipur High School. He was the headmaster of Chawk Atiqua High School from 1953 to 1954. He joined Naogaon Bashiruddin Memorial College as the Professor of Political Science after that. From 1957 he started his law career at the Naogaon subdivisional court.

He was active in the language movement of 1948. He was elected president of Naogaon unit of Awami League in 1969. The same year he was elected vice president of Rajshahi district unit of Awami League. He was elected the Pakistan National Assembly in 1970. He served as chief of Bangalipur youth camp during Bangladesh Liberation war. He was elected deputy speaker of the Parliament on 12 November 1972, after the independence of Bangladesh and again in 1973. In 1986 he was elected to the parliament for the last time.

== Death ==
He died on 9 March 1987. Mohammad Mahbubuzzaman was elected from his constituency after a by-election following Baitullah's death.
