= Mohammedan Law Courts Ordinance =

The Mohammedan Law Courts Ordinance was a law in the Sudan, passed by the Anglo-Egyptian colonial authorities in 1902. The law recognized the pre-eminence of sharia law for family and marital law, including inheritance.
