= Deputy Speaker of the Jatiya Sangsad =

Presiding officer of the Parliament of Bangladesh

- জাতীয় সংসদের ডেপুটি স্পিকার
- Emblem of the Sangsad

- Flag of the Jatiya Sangsad

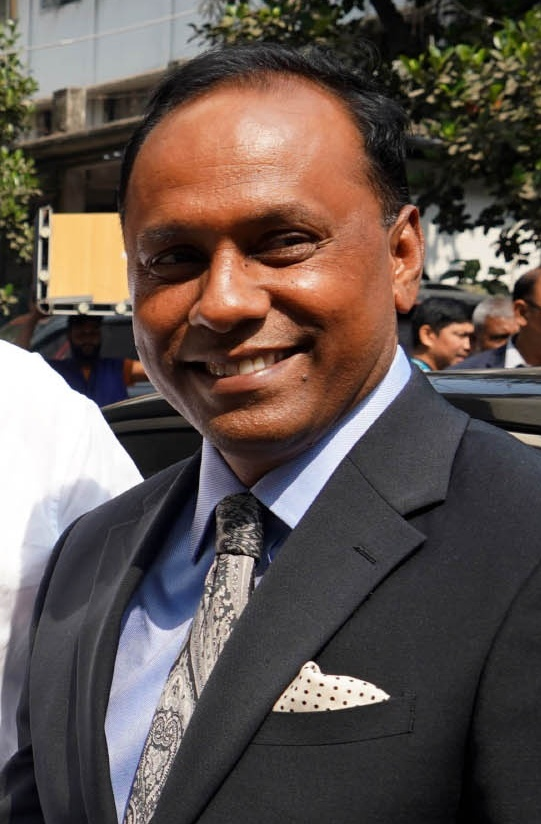
- Incumbent; Kayser Kamal since 12 March 2026
- Deputy Speaker's Office; House of the Nation
- Style: Mr/Mrs Speaker (informal); The Honourable (formal); His/Her Excellency (diplomatic)
- Status: Presiding officer of the Jatiya Sangsad; Cabinet Rank Post
- Member of: Jatiya Sangsad
- Reports to: Parliament of Bangladesh
- Residence: Deputy Speaker's Residence, Dhaka
- Seat: Jatiya Sangsad Bhaban, New Dhaka, Bangladesh
- Appointer: All Members of Parliament
- Term length: During the life of the Jatiya Sangsad (five years maximum); renewable
- Constituting instrument: Article 65 of Constitution of Bangladesh
- Inaugural holder: Mohammad Mohammadullah
- Formation: 10 April 1972; 54 years ago
- Salary: ৳187000 (US$1,500) per month (incl. allowances)
- Website: parliament.gov.bd

The Deputy Speaker of the Jatiya Sangsad (Bengali: জাতীয় সংসদের ডেপুটি স্পিকার) is the deputy presiding officer of the Jatiya Sangsad. The Deputy Speaker is elected by the members of parliament during the first session of a newly elected parliament, usually with support from both the ruling and opposition parties.

Serving a term of five years, the Deputy Speaker is chosen from among the sitting members of parliament. By convention, the Deputy Speaker is typically a member of the ruling party or its political alliance to ensure coordination in the conduct of parliamentary business. The Deputy Speaker presides over parliamentary proceedings in the absence of the Speaker and assists in maintaining order, managing debates, and ensuring adherence to parliamentary rules.

== Officeholders ==
Political parties

- Bangladesh Awami League
- Bangladesh Nationalist Party
- Jatiya Party

No.	Officeholder	From	To	Legislative body
1 (Note: Inaugural and final deputy speaker of the Constituent Assembly of Bangladesh)	Mohammad Mohammadullah	10 April 1972	11 October 1972	Ganaparishad
1	Mohammad Baitullah	7 April 1973	5 November 1975	1st Jatiya Sangsad
2	Sultan Ahmed	2 April 1979	23 March 1982	2nd Jatiya Sangsad
3	Md Korban Ali	10 July 1986	25 April 1988	3rd Jatiya Sangsad
4	Md. Reazuddin Ahmed	25 April 1988	5 April 1991	4th Jatiya Sangsad
5	Sheikh Razzak Ali	5 April 1991	12 October 1991	5th Jatiya Sangsad
6	Humayun Khan Panni	14 October 1991	19 March 1996	5th Jatiya Sangsad
7	L. K. Siddiqi	19 March 1996	14 July 1996	6th Jatiya Sangsad
8	Mohammad Abdul Hamid	14 July 1996	12 July 2001	7th Jatiya Sangsad
9	Ali Ashraf	12 July 2001	28 October 2001	7th Jatiya Sangsad
10	Akhtar Hameed Siddiqui	28 October 2001	25 January 2009	8th Jatiya Sangsad
11	Shawkat Ali	25 January 2009	29 January 2014	9th Jatiya Sangsad
12	Fazle Rabbi Miah	29 January 2014	30 January 2019	10th Jatiya Sangsad
12	Fazle Rabbi Miah	30 January 2019	22 July 2022	11th Jatiya Sangsad
13	Shamsul Hoque Tuku	28 August 2022	30 January 2024	11th Jatiya Sangsad
13	Shamsul Hoque Tuku	30 January 2024	6 August 2024	12th Jatiya Sangsad
14	Kayser Kamal	12 March, 2026	Incumbent	13th Jatiya Sangsad
