= Leader of the Opposition in Jatiya Sangsad =

Parliamentary position in Bangladesh

Leader of the Opposition of Jatiya Sangsad
- জাতীয় সংসদের বিরোধীদলীয় নেতা
- Emblem of the Jatiya Sangsad

- Flag of the Jatiya Sangsad

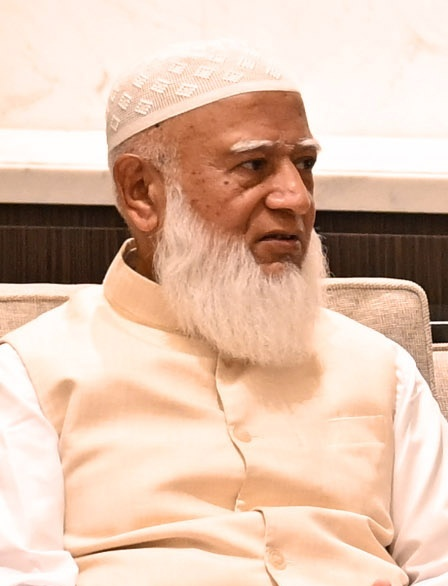
- Incumbent; Shafiqur Rahman since 17 February 2026
- House of the Nation
- Style: The Honorable (formal); His/Her Excellency (diplomatic)
- Member of: Shadow Cabinet; Jatiya Sangsad
- Reports to: Speaker; Jatiya Sangsad
- Residence: House No. 17, Road No. 2, Barabagh, Mirpur, Dhaka
- Seat: Jatiya Sangsad Bhaban, Sher-e-Bangla Nagar, Dhaka
- Appointer: All Opposition MPs
- Term length: 5 years; While leader of the largest political party in the Jatiya Sangsad
- Constituting instrument: Article 65 of Constitution of Bangladesh
- Inaugural holder: Asaduzzaman Khan
- Formation: 18 February 1979 (47 years ago)
- Deputy: Deputy Leader of the Opposition
- Salary: ৳172800 (US$1,400) per month (incl. allowances)
- Website: parliament.gov.bd

The Leader of the Opposition of Jatiya Sangsad (Bengali: জাতীয় সংসদের বিরোধীদলীয় নেতা) leads the Official Opposition in the Jatiya Sangsad, the national parliament of Bangladesh. The Leader of the Opposition is usually the head of the largest political party in the Jatiya Sangsad that is not part of the Government. In practice, this position is generally held by the leader of the second largest political party in parliament.

The Leader of the Opposition plays a key role in holding the government accountable, participating in parliamentary committees, and presenting alternative policies and viewpoints on national issues.

The post also carries the weight of a cabinet minister and is seen as comparable to that of the Prime Minister, who is the leader of the house and of their political party.

== List of leaders of the opposition in Jatiya Sangsad ==
There was no opposition leader in the 1st and the 6th Parliament.

| No. | Portrait | Leader of the Opposition | Party | Term of office | | Sangsad |
|---|---|---|---|---|---|---|
| N/A | Vacant | | N/A | 7 March 1973 | 18 February 1979 | 1st |
| 1 | | Asaduzzaman Khan | Bangladesh Awami League | 18 February 1979 | 24 March 1982 | 2nd |
| 2 | | Sheikh Hasina | Bangladesh Awami League | 7 May 1986 | 3 March 1988 | 3rd |
| 3 | | A. S. M. Abdur Rab | Jatiya Samajtantrik Dal | 3 March 1988 | 27 February 1991 | 4th |
| (2) | | Sheikh Hasina | Bangladesh Awami League | 27 February 1991 | 15 February 1996 | 5th |
| N/A | Vacant | | N/A | 15 February 1996 | 12 June 1996 | 6th |
| 4 | | Khaleda Zia | Bangladesh Nationalist Party | 12 June 1996 | 15 July 2001 | 7th |
| (2) | | Sheikh Hasina | Bangladesh Awami League | 1 October 2001 | 29 October 2006 | 8th |
| (4) | | Khaleda Zia | Bangladesh Nationalist Party | 29 December 2008 | 9 January 2014 | 9th |
| 5 | | Rowshan Ershad | Jatiya Party (Ershad) | 9 January 2014 | 3 January 2019 | 10th |
| 6 | | Hussain Muhammad Ershad | Jatiya Party (Ershad) | 3 January 2019 | 14 July 2019 | 11th |
| N/A | Vacant | | N/A | 14 July 2019 | 9 September 2019 | 11th |
| (5) | | Rowshan Ershad | Jatiya Party (Ershad) | 9 September 2019 | 10 January 2024 | 11th |
| 7 | | GM Quader | Jatiya Party (Ershad) | 28 January 2024 | 6 August 2024 | 12th |
| N/A | Vacant | | N/A | 6 August 2024 | 17 February 2026 | |
| 8 | | Shafiqur Rahman | Bangladesh Jamaat-e-Islami | 17 February 2026 | Incumbent | 13th |
