= Badalgachhi Upazila =

Badalgachhi Upazila বদলগাছি উপজেলা
- Upazila
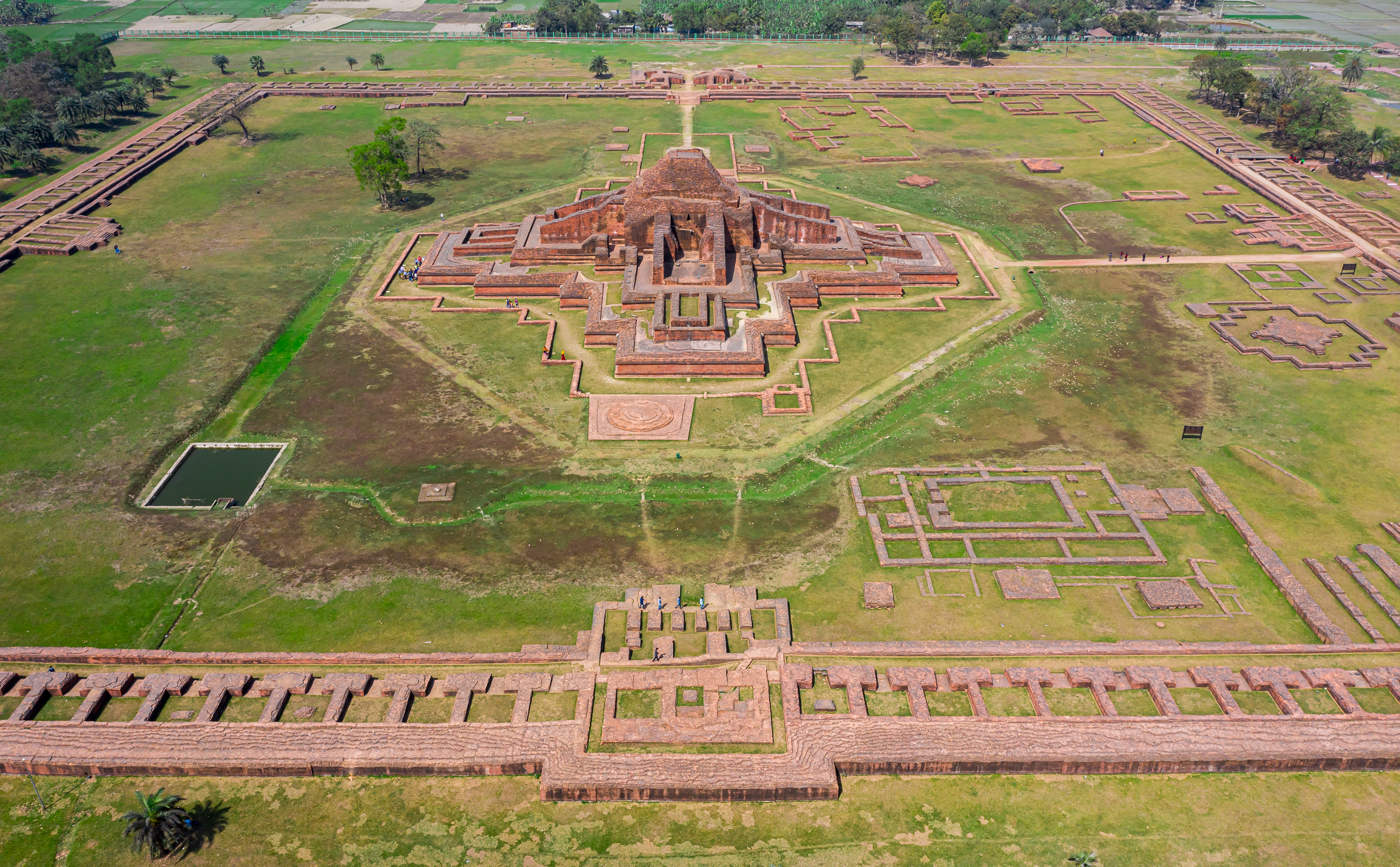
- Aerial view of Somapura Mahavihara

- Coordinates: 24°58′N 88°54′E
- Country: Bangladesh
- Division: Rajshahi
- District: Naogaon

Area
  - Total: 213.97 km^{2} (82.61 sq mi)

Population (2022)
  - Total: 206,557
  - Density: 965.35/km^{2} (2,500.3/sq mi)
- Time zone: UTC+6 (BST)
- Postal code: 6570

Badalgachhi Upazila mauza geocode map

Badalgacchi Upazila (Bengali: বদলগাছি উপজেলা) is a Upazila of Naogaon District under Rajshahi Division, Bangladesh.

== Geography ==
Map of Naogaon District

Badalgacchi is located at 24°58′N 88°54′E. It consists of 54,001 households and has a total area of 213.97 square kilometres (82.61 sq mi).

== Demographics ==
Religions in Badalgachhi Upazila (2022)
Religion	Percent
Islam	86.44%
Hinduism	12.32%
Other or not stated	1.24%

According to the 2022 Bangladeshi census, Badalgachhi Upazila had 59,358 households and a population of 206,557. 7.47% of the population were under 5 years of age. Badalgachhi had a literacy rate (age 7 and over) of 69.82%: 72.17% for males and 67.60% for females, and a sex ratio of 95.39 males for every 100 females. 12,856 (6.22%) lived in urban areas. Ethnic population was 8377 (4.06%), of which Munda were 3,640 and Oraon were 2,699.

Population of upazila by ethnicity (2022)
1. Bengali (95.9%)
2. Munda (1.76%)
3. Oraon (1.31%)
4. Others (0.99%)

According to the 2011 Census of Bangladesh, Badalgachhi Upazila had 54,001 households and a population of 201,342. 36,957 (18.36%) were under 10 years of age. Badalgachhi had a literacy rate (age 7 and over) of 49.55%, compared to the national average of 51.8%, and a sex ratio of 1002 females per 1000 males. 6,357 (3.16%) lived in urban areas. Ethnic population was 10,799 (5.36%), of which Oraon were 3,661.

In 1991, the population of Badalgacchia was 176,010. Males constitute 51.34% of the population, and females account for 48.66%. Badalgachi has an average literacy rate of 28.4% for persons seven years and older, which is below the national average of 32.4%.

== Points of interest ==
Somapura Mahavihara is situated in Paharpur village.

== Administration ==
Badalgachhi, formed as a thana (police station) in 1807, was converted into an upazila in 1983.

The upazila is divided into eight union parishads: Adhaipur, Badalgachhi, Balubhara, Bilasbari, Kola, Mathurapur, Mithapur, and Paharpur. The union parishads are subdivided into 247 mauzas and 238 villages.
