= Chief Whip of the Jatiya Sangsad =

Member of Bangladesh parliament

- জাতীয় সংসদের চিফ হুইপ
- Emblem of the Jatiya Sangsad

- Flag of the Jatiya Sangsad

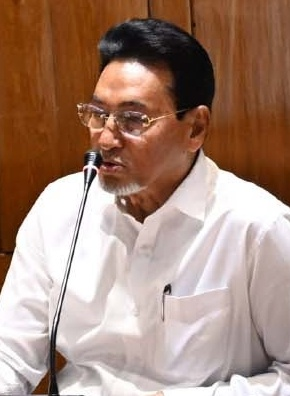
- Incumbent; Nurul Islam Moni since 3 March 2026
- House of the Nation
- Style: The Honorable (formal); His/Her Excellency (diplomatic)
- Abbreviation: CWOP
- Member of: Parliament
- Reports to: Speaker; Parliament
- Seat: Jatiya Sangsad Bhaban
- Appointer: President of Bangladesh; on the advice of the All Member of Parliament
- Term length: 5 years; renewable
- Constituting instrument: Article 65 of Constitution of Bangladesh
- Formation: 7 March 1973 (53 years ago)
- First holder: Shah Moazzem Hossain
- Deputy: Whips
- Salary: ৳172800 (US$1,400) per month (incl. allowances)
- Website: parliament-chief-whip-office

The Chief Whip of the Jatiya Sangsad (Bengali: জাতীয় সংসদের চিফ হুইপ) is a member of the Jatiya Sangsad from the ruling party who is appointed by the Prime Minister of Bangladesh. The Chief Whip is responsible for maintaining party discipline among members of the ruling party in parliament, ensuring their attendance during parliamentary sessions, organizing the party’s legislative agenda, and directing voting in accordance with party policy.

The work of the whip is to ensure the proper participation (as the party wants) of the party MPs in the activities of the parliament, such as voting. If the leader and deputy leader of parliament are absent, the whip can speak for them.

== List of Chief Whips ==
1. Shah Moazzem Hossain
2. Abul Hasnat
3. T.I.M. Fazlay Rabbi Chowdhury
4. M. A. Sattar
5. Khandaker Delwar Hossain
6. Abul Hasnat Abdullah
7. Khandaker Delwar Hossain
8. Md. Abdus Shahid
9. A. S. M. Feroz
10. Noor-E-Alam Chowdhury Liton
11. Nurul Islam Moni
