= Speaker of the Jatiya Sangsad =

Presiding officer of the Parliament of Bangladesh

- জাতীয় সংসদের স্পিকার
- Seal of the Speaker of the Jatiya Sangsad

- Standard of the Speaker of the Jatiya Sangsad

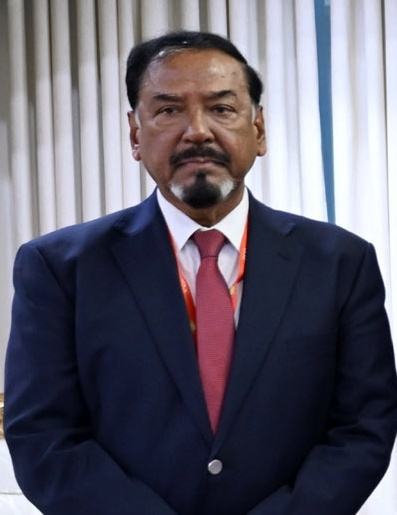
- Incumbent; Hafiz Uddin Ahmad since 12 March 2026
- Speaker's Office; House of the Nation
- Style: Mr/Mrs Speaker (informal); The Honourable (formal); His/Her Excellency (diplomatic)
- Status: Presiding officer of the Jatiya Sangsad; Cabinet Rank Post
- Member of: Jatiya Sangsad
- Reports to: Parliament of Bangladesh
- Residence: Speaker's Bhaban, Dhaka
- Seat: Jatiya Sangsad Bhaban, Dhaka, Bangladesh
- Appointer: All Members of Parliament
- Term length: During the life of the Jatiya Sangsad (five years maximum); renewable
- Constituting instrument: Article 65 of Constitution of Bangladesh
- Inaugural holder: Shah Abdul Hamid
- Formation: 10 April 1972; 54 years ago
- Deputy: Deputy Speaker of the Jatiya Sangsad
- Salary: ৳187000 (US$1,500) per month (incl. allowances)
- Website: parliament.gov.bd

The Speaker of the Jatiya Sangsad (Bengali: জাতীয় সংসদের স্পিকার) is the presiding officer of the Jatiya Sangsad. The Speaker is elected by the members of parliament during the first session of a newly elected parliament, following general elections. Serving a term of five years, the Speaker is chosen from among the sitting members of parliament and, by convention, is usually a member of the ruling party or its political alliance. The Speaker presides over parliamentary proceedings, ensures that debates are conducted according to parliamentary rules, maintains order in the House, and represents the Jatiya Sangsad in all official capacities.

== Powers and functions ==
In exercising his powers whether vested in him by the Constitution, the Rules of Procedure, or any other law, the Speaker of Jatiya Sangsad like his counterparts in any parliamentary democracy of the Westminster model, assumes a neutral role. He conducts but does not take part in, the proceedings of the House. The Speaker cannot vote on any motion under discussion in the House. Only in case of a tie or equality of votes, he/she has to exercise his/her casting vote to help the House avoid a stalemate and arrive at a discussion. The powers and functions of the Speaker emanate from the Constitution and the Rules of Procedure. Some statutes have also vested him with some powers, duties and responsibilities. The constitutional powers and responsibilities of the Speaker include the following:

- The Speaker performs the functions of the President, if there is a temporary vacancy in that office or if the President is unable to perform his functions until a President is elected or the President resumes his duties, as the case may be;
- The Speaker administers oath to members of parliament or nominates someone to do so;
- A person elected as a Member of Parliament has to take oath of office within 90 days of his election or lose his seat. The Speaker can extend this period for good cause;
- Should a dispute arise as to the leadership of a parliamentary party, the Speaker has been invested with powers to resolve the dispute following the procedure laid down in clause (2) of Article 70 and determine its leadership by the majority of votes through a division;
- The Speaker causes a notification to be issued by the Parliament Secretariat declaring the seat of a member of Parliament vacant on account of death, resignation, failure to take oath within 90 days of her election or within the time extended for this purpose by the Speaker, absence from Parliament without leave for ninety consecutive sitting days;
- The Speaker also causes a similar notification to be issued when a member resigns from, or votes against, the party which had nominated him/her as a candidate at the election or if a member earns any disqualification that makes a person ineligible for election as a member of parliament. If, however, any dispute arises on these matters, the Speaker refers the matter to the Election Commission for a decision;
- The Speaker authenticates all Bills passed in Parliament when presented to the President for his assent. If a Bill bears a certificate under the hand of the Speaker that it is a 'money bill' then that certificate is conclusive for all purposes and cannot be questioned in any court.
- Enormous powers and responsibilities have been given to the Speaker by the Rules of Procedure of Jatiya Sangsad. The following is only a short list of those powers and responsibilities that the Speaker enjoys or shoulders in the conduct of business and other related matters:
- The Speaker decides the admissibility of notices for questions, resolutions, petitions, questions of privileges, short discussions, half-an-hour discussions, adjournment motions, call attention and all other notices intended to be raised in the House for a discussion;
- The Speaker decides all points of order raised in the House;
- The Speaker decides the duration of discussion on any subject if it is not already decided by the rules. He allocates time for each speaker to speak on a subject;
- The Speaker can apply the guillotine on discussions on cut motions on demands for grants to put the demands directly to vote;
- The Speaker reads out messages of the President received on a Bill returned by him for reconsideration and if the Parliament is not in session he gets the message published in the Bulletin and lays it in the House in its first sitting after receipt of the message;
- The Speaker can expunge any word uttered in the House which he considers to be un-parliamentary;
- The Speaker nominates four important committees of the House and he is the ex officio Chairman of two important committees viz. the Business Advisory Committee and the Committee on Rules of Procedure;
- The Speaker can convene a meeting of a standing committee on a Ministry if such meeting is not called by its chairman within the time prescribed by the rules;
- The Speaker can authorise a meeting of a parliamentary committee to be held outside the precincts of Parliament;
- The Speaker gives the final decision as to whether a document is relevant or not for production before a parliamentary committee;
- The Speaker has to be informed if a member of parliament is arrested or when he is released from custody.
- In case of disorderly conduct of a member in the House, the Speaker can direct him to go out of the House and take other disciplinary action against him;
- The Speaker controls entry into those parts of the House which are exclusively reserved for members;
- If any matter arises in connection with the business of the House or in the committees for which no provision exists in the Rules of Procedure, the Speaker decides the matter.

The Speaker has been vested with many powers and responsibilities under different statutes. Under the Parliament Secretariat Act 1994, the administrative responsibilities of the Parliament Secretariat are vested in him. He is the final authority for the sanction of expenditure out of the budget of the Parliament Secretariat. He also nominates, such a number of members of parliament, as prescribed in the relevant law, to the senates of 7 major Universities of the country. Besides, there are other statutory bodies and institutions to whose governing bodies she nominates members of parliament as prescribed by law.

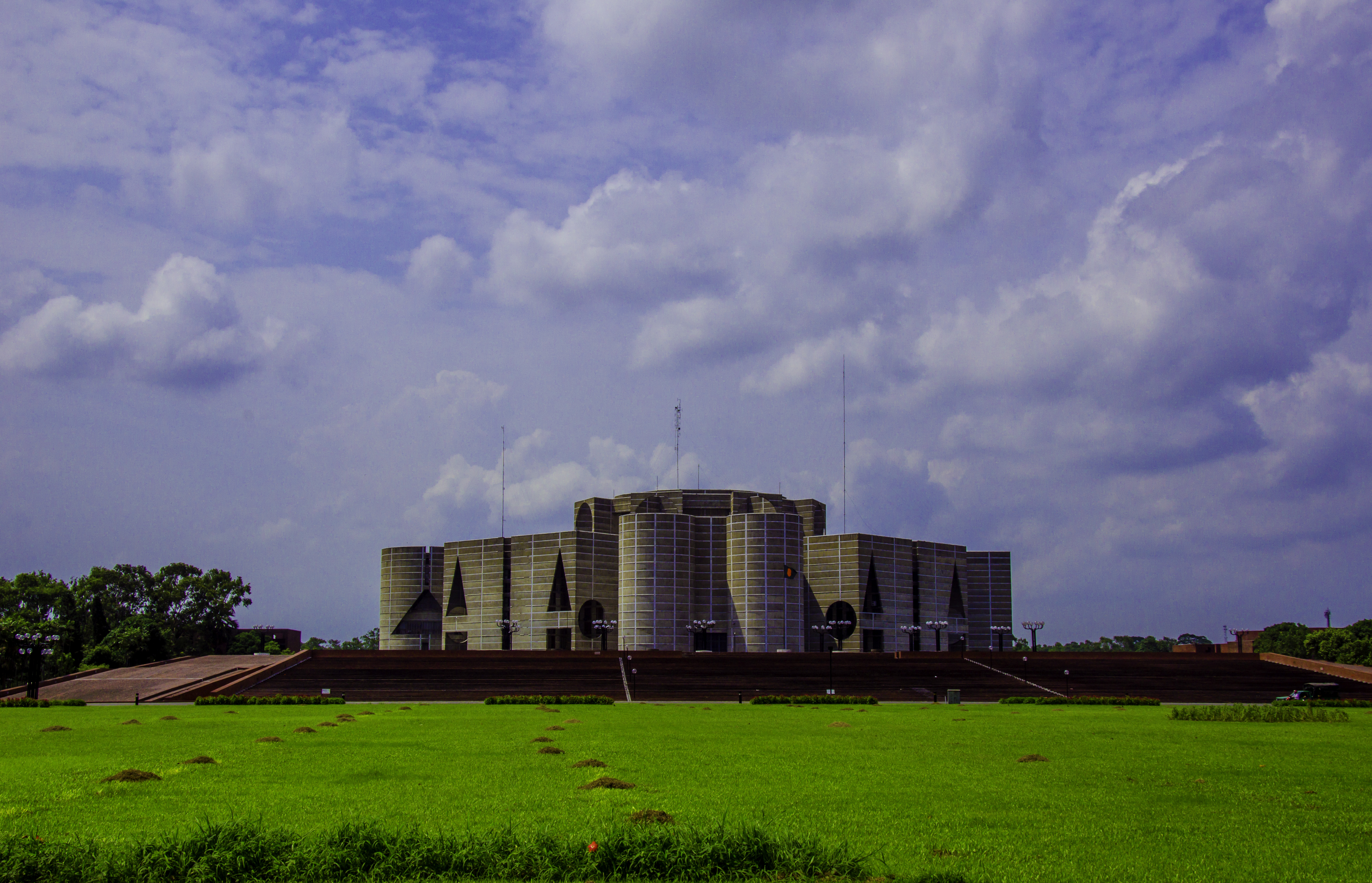
Parliament of Bangladesh (2014)

== Election ==
At the first sitting after a general election, Parliament presided over by the outgoing Speaker or, in his absence, by the Deputy Speaker, proceeds first to elect a Speaker and a Deputy Speaker in the manner laid down in the Rules of Procedure. A person however cannot preside over his own election. After the election of the Speaker and the Deputy Speaker, the House is adjourned for a short period to enable the newly elected Speaker and Deputy Speaker to take oath of office. The House then meets with the new Speaker presiding.

== Tenure ==
The Speaker and the Deputy Speaker are deemed to have assumed their offices as soon as they take oath from the President after their election and continue in their offices until their respective successors take over generally at the commencement of a new Parliament. In the constitutional arrangement of Bangladesh, as soon as a care-taker government comes into power following the dissolution of Parliament and the Prime Minister and the members of the Cabinet, the Leader and the Deputy Leader of the Opposition and the Chief Whip and Whips of Parliament are deemed to have relieved themselves of their responsibilities. Only the Speaker and the Deputy Speaker continue in office as a link between one Parliament and the next.

== Officeholders ==
Political parties

- Bangladesh Awami League
- BaKSAL
- Bangladesh Nationalist Party
- Jatiya Party

No.	Speaker	Took office	Left office	Jatiya Sangsad
1 (Note: Inaugural and final speaker of the Constituent Assembly of Bangladesh)	Shah Abdul Hamid	10 April 1972	1 May 1972	Ganaparishad
1	Mohammad Mohammadullah	12 October 1972	27 January 1974	1st Jatiya Sangsad
2	Abdul Malek Ukil	28 January 1974	5 November 1975	1st Jatiya Sangsad
3	Mirza Ghulam Hafiz	2 April 1979	23 March 1982	2nd Jatiya Sangsad
4	Shamsul Huda Chaudhury	10 July 1986	25 April 1988	3rd Jatiya Sangsad
4	Shamsul Huda Chaudhury	25 April 1988	5 April 1991	4th Jatiya Sangsad
5	Abdur Rahman Biswas	5 April 1991	10 October 1991	5th Jatiya Sangsad
6	Sheikh Razzak Ali	12 October 1991	19 March 1996	5th Jatiya Sangsad
6	Sheikh Razzak Ali	19 March 1996	14 July 1996	6th Jatiya Sangsad
7	Humayun Rashid Choudhury	14 July 1996	10 July 2001	7th Jatiya Sangsad
8	Mohammad Abdul Hamid	12 July 2001	28 October 2001	7th Jatiya Sangsad
9	Barrister Muhammad Jamiruddin Sircar	28 October 2001	25 January 2009	8th Jatiya Sangsad
—	Akhtar Hameed Siddiqui	21 June 2002	6 September 2002	8th Jatiya Sangsad
10	Mohammad Abdul Hamid	25 January 2009	24 April 2013	9th Jatiya Sangsad
—	Shawkat Ali	24 April 2013	30 April 2013	9th Jatiya Sangsad
11	Shirin Sharmin Chaudhury	30 April 2013	29 January 2014	9th Jatiya Sangsad
11	Shirin Sharmin Chaudhury	29 January 2014	30 January 2019	10th Jatiya Sangsad
11	Shirin Sharmin Chaudhury	30 January 2019	30 January 2024	11th Jatiya Sangsad
11	Shirin Sharmin Chaudhury	30 January 2024	2 September 2024	12th Jatiya Sangsad
12	Hafiz Uddin Ahmad	12 March 2026	Incumbent	13th Jatiya Sangsad
—	Kayser Kamal	24 July 2026	21 August 2026	13th Jatiya Sangsad

== Sources ==
- "Advisory Council meeting: Law adviser to carry out duties of speaker". Dhaka Tribune. 31 October 2024.
- "Former Bangladesh Speaker, former Commerce Minister arrested in murder case". The Hindu. 29 August 2024. Archived from the original on 6 September 2024.
- "President administers oath to new Speaker, Deputy Speaker". Views Bangladesh. 12 March 2026.
- "Speaker, deputy speaker elected: What powers do they hold?". The Business Standard. 12 March 2026.
