= Jatiya Sangsad =

Unicameral legislature of Bangladesh

Coordinates: 23°45′44″N 90°22′43″E

Jatiya Sangsad জাতীয় সংসদ
- 13th Jatiya Sangsad
- Emblem

- Flag

Type
- Type: Unicameral

History
- Founded: 7 March 1973; 53 years ago
- Preceded by: Constituent Assembly of Bangladesh
- New session started: 12 March 2026

Leadership
- Speaker: Hafiz Uddin Ahmad, BNP since 12 March 2026
- Deputy Speaker: Kayser Kamal, BNP since 12 March 2026
- Leader of the House (Prime Minister): Tarique Rahman, BNP since 17 February 2026
- Chief Whip of the House: Nurul Islam Moni, BNP since 2 March 2026
- Leader of the Opposition: Shafiqur Rahman, Jamaat since 17 February 2026
- Deputy Leader of the Opposition: Syed Abdullah Mohammed Taher, Jamaat since 17 February 2026
- Chief Whip of the Opposition: Nahid Islam, NCP since 17 February 2026

Structure
- Seats: 350
- Political groups: Government (249): BNP (246); BJP (1); GSA (1); GOP (1); Supported by (7): Independent (7); Opposition (89): 11 Party Alliance (88); Jamaat (76); NCP (8); BKM (3); JGP (1); KM (1); Crossbench (3): Independent (2); IAB (1); Vacant (2)
- Length of term: Up to five years

Elections
- Voting system: 300 seats directly elected via First-past-the-post; 50 seats reserved for women, allocated proportionally based on each party’s share of the 300 general seats and filled through party nomination
- First election: 7 March 1973
- Last election: 12 February 2026
- Next election: By 2031

Meeting place
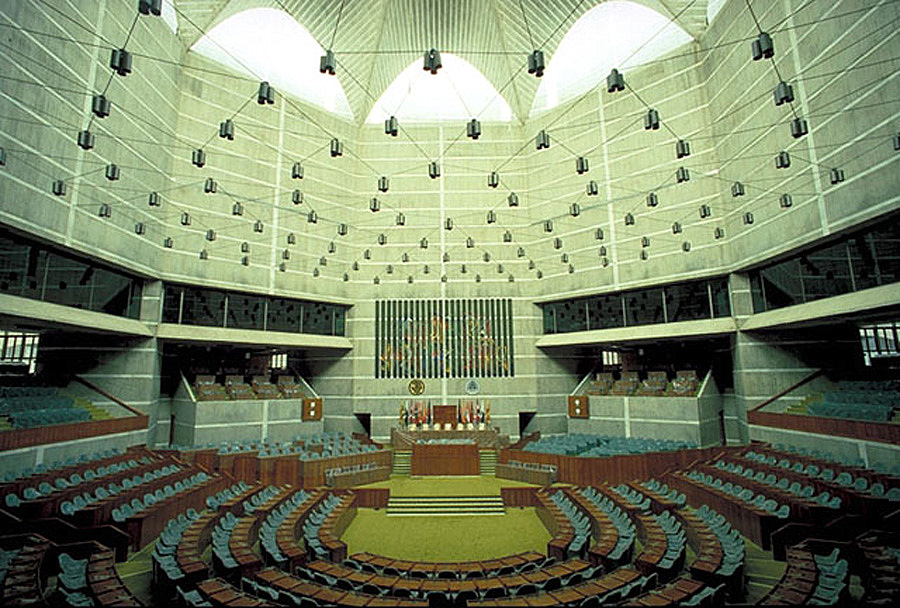
- Jatiya Sangsad Bhaban, Sher-e-Bangla Nagar, Dhaka, Bangladesh

Website
- www.parliament.gov.bd

Constitution
- Constitution of Bangladesh

The Jatiya Sangsad (Note: Bengali: জাতীয় সংসদ, romanised: Jātīẏô Sôṅsôd, pronounced [ˈdʒati̯oˑ ˈʃɔŋʃɔd]) (JS, lit. 'National Parliament'), constitutionally the House of the Nation and officially in English as Bangladesh Parliament, is the unicameral legislative body of Bangladesh.

The origin of the Jatiya Sangsad lies in the Constituent Assembly of Bangladesh (1972–73), which was the first parliament of Bangladesh responsible for the promulgation of the Constitution of Bangladesh. Since 1981, Jatiya Sangsad Bhaban, situated in Sher-e-Bangla Nagar, Dhaka, has been hosting the sessions of the Jatiya Sangsad.

The current Sangsad contains 350 seats, including 50 seats reserved exclusively for women. Elected occupants are called members of parliament (MPs). Elections to the body are held every five years, unless a Sangsad is dissolved earlier by the president of Bangladesh. The leader of the party, or coalition of parties, holding a majority of seats in Sangsad becomes the prime minister of Bangladesh and thus serves as the head of government. The president, the ceremonial head of state of Bangladesh, is chosen by the Sangsad. Article 70 bars any MP to vote against or switch his party.

It has been proposed to make the legislative body into a bicameral legislature, with an upper house named Senate to be established.

== Terminology ==
The Constitution of Bangladesh designates the official name of the legislature Jatiya Sangsad (জাতীয় সংসদ) in Bengali and House of the Nation in English. The term sangsad (sôṅsôd [ˈʃɔŋʃɔd]), Bengali word for parliament, derives from the Sanskrit word saṃsada (lit. 'gathering' or 'assembly'), while the Bengali word jatiya (jātīẏô [ˈdʒati̯oˑ]) means "national", hence, the name "Jatiya Sangsad" translates as "national parliament". The legislature is commonly known as "Parliament" and often referred to simply as the Sangsad.

The term "Member of Parliament" (Bengali: সংসদ সদস্য, romanised: sôṅsôd sôdôsyô, abbreviated as "MP") refers to both the 300 elected members and the 50 nominated women members of the Sangsad. Members of Parliament are legally entitled to use the prefix "The Honourable" (Bengali: মাননীয়, romanised: mānôniẏô).

== Background ==
The Constituent Assembly of Bangladesh was established on 10 April 1972 in the aftermath of the Liberation War to prepare a democratic constitution and served as its first parliament as an independent nation. The Assembly approved the constitution on 4 November 1972, and it took effect on 16 December, the Victory Day of Bangladesh. The Constituent Assembly became the provisional parliament of Bangladesh until the first election under the new constitution took place in 1973.

Until 10 July 1981, the Constituent Assembly, along with the first and second Sangsads, held their sittings in the building that now houses the Prime Minister's Office, commonly referred to as the Old Sangsad Bhaban. The opening ceremony of the present parliament house was performed on 15 February 1982. The last session of the second Sangsad was held in the new house on 15 February 1982.

== Powers and rights ==
The president of Bangladesh appoints a cabinet with the prime minister and other ministers from among the members. The prime minister must be a member of parliament, and so must at least 90% of the ministers. The president must appoint a prime minister who, in his reasoned opinion, commands the confidence of the majority of the House (Sangsad). The cabinet remains answerable to the Parliament and the president.

The president is elected by the Sangsad through open ballot voting. As a result, the opposition party seldom nominates a candidate and the governing party nominee is uncontested. Presidents including Mohammed Shahabuddin, Mohammad Abdul Hamid, Zillur Rahman, Iajuddin Ahmed, A. Q. M. Badruddoza Chowdhury and Shahabuddin Ahmed were all elected unopposed. The Sangsad can also impeach the president by a two-thirds majority.

The Sangsad can form any parliamentary standing committees as it sees fit such as for the purposes of examining bills, reviewing government policy and any other matter of public importance. The de facto power of the committees has always been nominal however; the de jure power too is ambiguous, especially after the Supreme Court ruled that it was not answerable to summons from parliamentary committees and senior civil servants rarely being brought before committees to answer for public administrative decisions.

In practice, the Sangsad has been regarded as a rubber stamp body as MPs cannot cross the floor, have free votes (vote against their party whip) or pass motions of no confidence due to Article 70 of the Constitution of Bangladesh. This article imposes ultra-strict party discipline on the chamber; any MP voting against their party automatically loses their seat. Political scientists, judges in the Supreme Court, public intellectuals, newspapers and journalists, civil rights activists and many members of parliament have demanded reform of the article.

Critics argue Article 70 tramples freedom of speech and freedom of conscience and is a violation of the constitution's fundamental rights. Additionally, it significantly limits the checks and balances on the prime minister, as there are few means by which s/he can be legally dismissed under the constitution or even held to basic scrutiny with repercussions. The Sangsad usually reflects the will of the government, not vice versa as in a well-functioning parliamentary democracy. The checks and balances then formed on the prime minister and their cabinet are by civil servants in the Bangladesh Administrative Service and the courts, which are usually too docile to challenge the executive.

Article 78 of the constitution provides immunity for the speeches, actions and votes of the members within parliamentary sessions, and so members are not answerable for any such actions to the courts. The parliament itself is vested with the power to provide indemnity to anybody in service of the nation under Article 46. This allowed the second parliament in 1979 to ratify the Indemnity Ordinance.

== Organisation ==
=== Parliamentary groups ===
The parliamentary groups of the Jatiya Sangsad are groups of members of parliament organised by a political party or coalition of parties. The leadership of each groups consists of a parliamentary party leader, deputy leader, whips and a parliamentary working committee. The size of a group determines the extent of its representation on legislative committees, the time slots allotted for speaking, the number of committee chairs it can hold, and its representation in executive bodies of the parliament.

Current composition

- Government coalition
  - Leader of the House; the post is usually held by the prime minister
  - Deputy Leader of the House (who leads the day-to-day business of the government in the Sangsad)
  - Chief Whip (who is supported by six additional whips)
- Official opposition
  - Leader of the Opposition
  - Deputy Leader of the Opposition
  - Chief Whip of the Opposition

=== Executive bodies ===
The Sangsad's executive bodies include the speaker, the House Committee and the Parliament Secretariat. The House Committee consists of the parliament speaker, deputy speaker and whips. Every major political party appoints a whip who is responsible for the party's discipline and behaviour of its members on the floor of the house. The committee is the coordination hub, determining the daily legislative agenda and assigning committee chairpersons based on parliamentary group representation. The Parliament Secretariat, headed by a senior secretary from the Bangladesh Administrative Service, is in charge of all its supporting and advisory duties such as keeping a record of members' voting, speeches, advising on protocol, general clerical, broadcasting and information activities.

Current composition

- Speaker
- Deputy Speaker
- House Committee
- Parliament Secretariat

=== Committees ===
Most of the legislative work in the Sangsad is done in the standing committees, which exist largely unchanged throughout one legislative period. The Sangsad has several committees, with small numbers of members appointed to deal with particular topics or issues. The Committees on Ministry (CoM) are committees that are set down under the Sangsad's standing orders. The number of Committees in the Ministry approximates the number of ministries of Bangladesh, and the titles of each are roughly similar (e.g., defence, agriculture, and labour). There are, as of the current tenth parliament (2014–2019), 50 standing committees. The distribution of committee chairs and the membership of each committee reflect the relative strength of the various parliamentary groups in the house.

Current committees

- Committee on Estimates
- Committee on Government Assurances
- Standing Committee on Public Accounts
- Library Committee
- Committee on Petitions
- Committee on Private Member's Bills and Resolutions
- Standing Committee of Privileges
- House Committee
- Business Advisory Committee
- Standing Committee on Rules of Procedure
- Committee on Public Undertakings
- 39 Committees on Ministry (CoMs)

== Structures ==
=== Building ===
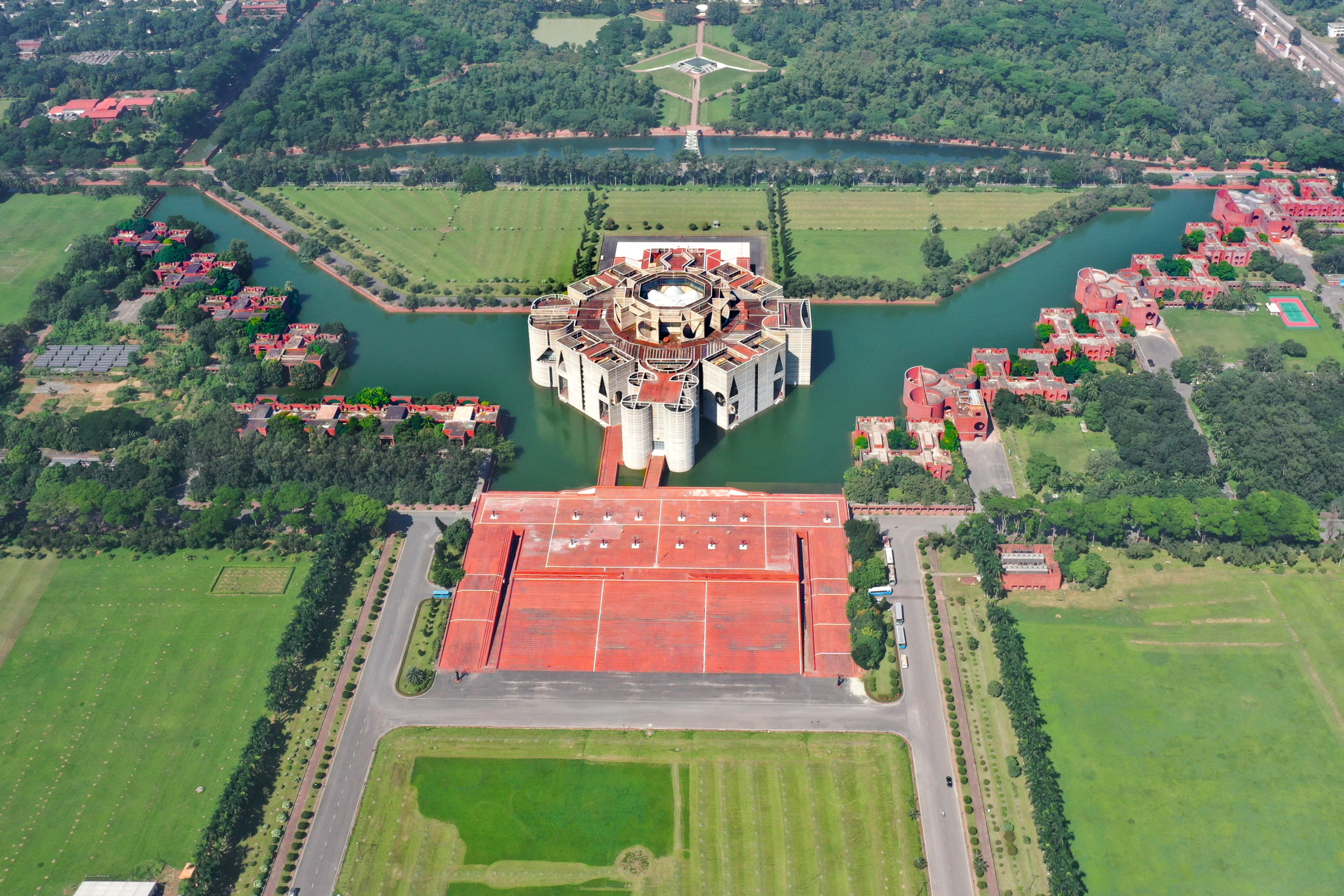
Jatiya Sangsad Bhaban complex in Sher-e-Bangla Nagar, Dhaka

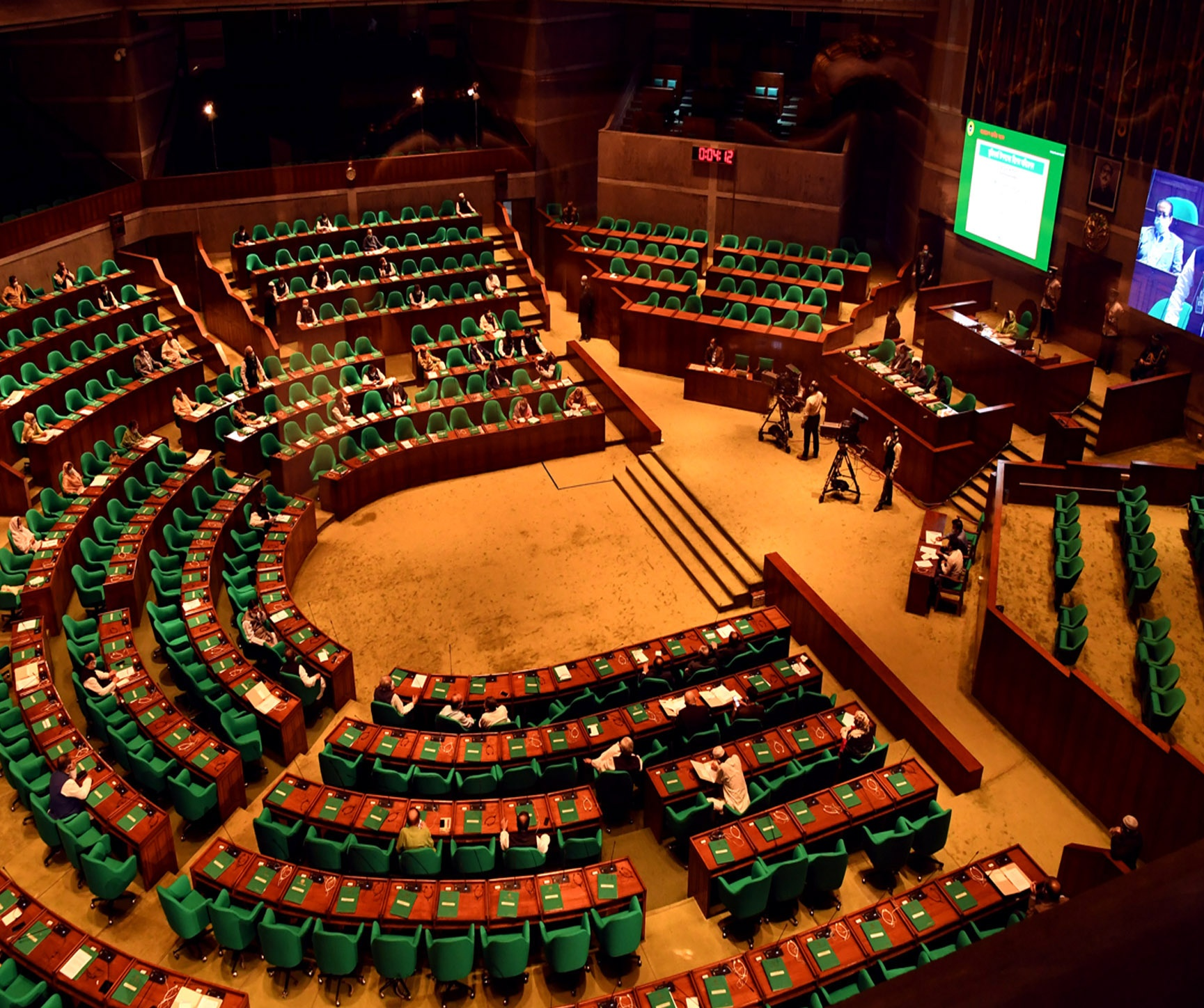
Inside the Jatiya Sangsad Bhaban during a session

The parliament is housed in the Jatiya Sangsad Bhaban (lit. 'National Parliament Building'), located at Sher-e-Bangla Nagar in the Bangladeshi capital of Dhaka. Designed by the American architect Louis Kahn, the building is one of the largest legislative complexes in the world, comprising 200 acres (81 ha). Louis Kahn designed the entire Jatiya Sangsad complex, which includes lawns, lake and residences for the MPs. The main building, which is at the centre of the complex, is divided into three parts – the Main Plaza, South Plaza and Presidential Plaza.

=== Library ===
The Sangsad Library or Parliament Library claims to be the most comprehensive in Bangladesh, holding over 85,000 books and many more reports, parliamentary debates, government gazettes, journals, magazines and newspapers. The library is housed in Jatiya Sangsad Bhaban. The library was established in 1972, after the immediate formation of the Constituent Assembly of Bangladesh to support the lawmakers and their staff. The library is administered by the parliamentary librarian, a statutory officer responsible for the control and management of the facility, reporting to the deputy speaker and the Library Committee. Although the library is open to the public, only current and former MPs, secretariat staff, and authorised researchers may check out books and materials.

=== Broadcasting ===
The Sangsad Bangladesh Television (publicly known as Sangsad TV) is a digital television channel in Bangladesh. It broadcasts parliamentary activity following its establishment under the Broadcasting Act 2011. Prior to the establishment of the Sangsad Television, the Sangsad's programming was produced by the Ministry of Information and relayed in its Bangladesh Television.

== Constituencies ==
Parliamentary constituencies in Bangladesh

The maximum strength of the Sangsad envisaged by the Constitution of Bangladesh is 350, which is made up of the general election of 300 members to represent 300 parliamentary constituencies and 50 seats reserved for women, which are apportioned to elected party positions in the Sangsad. The electoral districts are referred to as the nirbācônī ēlākā (নির্বাচনী এলাকা) in Bengali, which can be roughly translated as "electoral area", though the official English translation for the term is constituency.

The constituencies are arranged to coincide with the administrative districts of Bangladesh, distributed among the proportion to their population. Numbers may vary from two to twenty members per district. The seats are indicated with the district name suffixed by a number (e.g., Panchagarh-1 or Jessore-6). Each constituency is represented by a single MP, and is elected by the first-past-the-post (FPTP) system.

== Membership ==
Article 66 of the constitution makes membership open to any citizen of Bangladesh and only to citizens above the age of 25; dual citizenship is possible for civilians in Bangladesh, but not for MPs who must not hold any other citizenship.

Members are elected by direct polling in their respective constituencies. Whoever wins the most votes, regardless of turnout or proportion, wins the election. Members are elected for a term of five years, with the entire Sangsad dissolving five years after the swearing-in. Members can be re-elected indefinitely, and so have no term limits. They may be independent or affiliated with a political party.

Members must not have served time in prison for more than two years to be eligible, unless they served this period five years prior to the general election date.

Article 67 states that members absent without leave for 90 consecutive sitting days will lose their membership. Any ambiguity regarding membership will be resolved by the Election Commission. Attending sessions without being a member (even if memberships are cancelled in retrospect) results in a BDT1,000 (US$11.75) fine per day, per Article 69.

=== Floor crossing ===
Article 70 of the constitution makes floor crossing illegal. Members engaging in floor crossing lose their membership immediately. Floor crossing is described in the constitution as:

- Resignation from the political party that nominated the member,
- Voting against the nominating party, or
- Abstaining from voting, either by abstention or absence and against the directive of the party Whip.

The only case of floor crossing in Bangladeshi history due to the stringent article was when members M. A. Mannan and Mahi B. Chowdhury defected from the Bangladesh National Party (BNP) to form a new party, Bikolpo Dhara. Fresh by-elections were held soon after the seats were vacated. Mahi B. Chowdhury retained his seat under the new party, whereas Mannan lost.

As most candidates are elected by the funding, support and brand name of the party, and resignation from the party is considered to void the choice of the people. The prime objective of banning floor crossing is to prevent members from joining other parties for personal gains or to induce disloyalty. This is crucial in marginal majorities, where a few members voting against the majority essentially changes the government party in power causing political instability.

The negative effects are broad however such as stopping members from speaking out against bad policies pitched by their party or voting against their party on legislation. This is considered harmful to parliamentary democracy, as the ban forces members to agree with their party leaders regardless of their own opinions or the opinions of their constituents.

=== Double membership ===
Article 71 of the constitution allows eligible people to be candidates in more than one constituency. However, if elected from multiple seats, the member must vacate all but one seat. It is usually the custom for prominent politicians, especially party leaders to stand in multiple constituencies. During the 2008 election, Awami League (AL) leader Sheikh Hasina, prominent AL figure (and later president of Bangladesh) Zillur Rahman, BNP leader Khaleda Zia and Jatiya Party leader H M Ershad all were candidates in the maximum possible number of constituencies.

== Proposed reforms ==
A proposal to reform Bangladesh's legislature from a unicameral to a bicameral system has been suggested by legal scholars and policy experts. According to a 2025 analysis published in Verfassungsblog, the aim of the proposal is to enhance democratic oversight and improve representation.

Under the proposed reforms, voters would be able to directly elect both chambers of the Sangsad, with the lower chamber would have the power to nominated or remove the prime minister and the cabinet as seen in the semi-parliamentary system (pictured), however, unlike the semi-parliamentary system, both legislative and confidential functions would be carried out by the lower chamber, making it a hybrid parliament system.

The suggested system would consist of two chambers: a National Assembly (lower house) and a Senate (upper house), each serving four-year terms. The National Assembly would consist of 400 members:

- 300 directly elected by a first-past-the-post (FPTP) system;
- 100 women elected from reserved constituencies;
- A 10% youth representation quota, with the candidacy age lowered to 21.

The Senate would comprise 105 members:

- 100 elected via proportional representation (PR), reflecting vote shares from the National Assembly elections;
- 5 nominated by the President to represent marginalised communities.

Under the proposed model, the Senate would not introduce legislation but would have powers to review, suggest amendments, and delay bills passed by the National Assembly, offering a mechanism for legislative moderation. This model draws from practices in other parliamentary democracies and includes semi-parliamentary characteristics designed to balance executive-legislative relations and enhance inclusive governance.

A Shushashoner Jonno Nagorik (ShuJonN) opinion poll conducted on 1,373 person between May and July 2025 found that 71% people in the country support PR in the proposed upper house of the Jatiya Sangsad and 69% people support bicameral legislature for the country.

After month-long dialogue with the political parties in 2025, the National Consensus Commission, set up by the Yunus interim government to build consensus among parties over basic reforms, finalised its decision to establish a bicameral legislature for Bangladesh comprising 450 seats, with the upper chamber comprising 100 seats to be nominated through PR from the popular vote share with 1% threshold, and the lower chamber comprising 350 seats to be combinedly nominated through FPTP and PR as usual. Although women-researved seats in the proposed lower chamber would remain 50, the parties would be obliged to nominate at least 7% female candidates in the general elections. Though the upper chamber would not poses any legislative power, it would have mandate to review any bills or laws proposed by the lower chamber and every bill (except financial bills) have to be presented to the both chambers. The upper chamber cannot hold any bill more than a month, if holds, then the bill would be considered "unapproved" and would be sent back to the lower chamber to review again.

Political analysts welcome the decision for introducing PR based on popular votes in the upper chamber, although the Bangladesh Nationalist Party and its allies objected the decision and favoured seat distribution of the upper chamber based on lower chamber distributions.

Final proposal for the composition of a bicameral legislature of Bangladesh
House	Method of selection	Number of members	Notes
House of the Nation	Direct election (FPTP)	300	Members elected from single-member constituencies; includes a 7% female candidacy quota
House of the Nation	Proportional representation (PR)	100	Reserved seats for women; allocated proportionally based on the results of directly elected seats
Senate	Proportional representation (PR)	100	Seats allocated based on national vote share in general elections, with a 1% threshold
Senate	Presidential nomination	5	Eminent citizens nominated by the President
Total		505	

== List of Jatiya Sangsad terms ==
Legislature	Election	Majority	Leader of House	Opposition	Leader of the Opposition	List of members
1st	1973	Awami League	Sheikh Mujibur Rahman	None	None	List
2nd	1979	Bangladesh Nationalist Party	Shah Azizur Rahman	Awami League	Asaduzzaman Khan	List
3rd	1986	Jatiya Party (Ershad)	Mizanur Rahman Chowdhury	Awami League	Sheikh Hasina	List
4th	1988	Jatiya Party (Ershad)	Kazi Zafar Ahmed	Coalition opposition	A. S. M. Abdur Rab	List
5th	1991	Bangladesh Nationalist Party	Khaleda Zia	Awami League	Sheikh Hasina	List
6th	February 1996	Bangladesh Nationalist Party	Khaleda Zia	None	None	List
7th'	June 1996	Awami League	Sheikh Hasina	Bangladesh Nationalist Party	Khaleda Zia	List
8th	2001	Bangladesh Nationalist Party	Khaleda Zia	Awami League	Sheikh Hasina	List
9th	2008	Awami League	Sheikh Hasina	Bangladesh Nationalist Party	Khaleda Zia	List
10th	2014	Awami League	Sheikh Hasina	Jatiya Party (Ershad)	Rowshan Ershad	List
11th	2018	Awami League	Sheikh Hasina	Jatiya Party (Ershad)	Hussain Muhammad Ershad; Rowshan Ershad	List
12th	2024	Awami League	Sheikh Hasina	Jatiya Party (Ershad)	Ghulam Muhammed Quader	List
13th	2026	Bangladesh Nationalist Party	Tarique Rahman	Bangladesh Jamaat-e-Islami	Shafiqur Rahman	List

== See also ==
- List of members of the 13th Jatiya Sangsad
- Politics of Bangladesh
- List of acts of the Jatiya Sangsad
- List of legislatures by country
