= List of members of the 8th Jatiya Sangsad =

8th Jatiya Sangsad
←	7th	9th	→
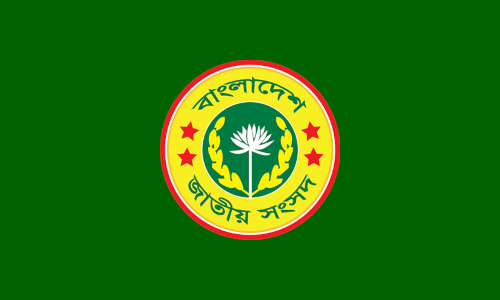
- Flag of the Jatiya Sangsad

Overview
- Legislative body: Bangladesh Parliament
- Term: 28 October 2001 – 27 October 2006
- Election: 2001
- Government: Bangladesh Nationalist Party
- Opposition: Awami League

Sovereign
- President: Shahabuddin Ahmed; A. Q. M. Badruddoza Chowdhury; Muhammad Jamiruddin Sircar (Acting); Iajuddin Ahmed

House of the Nation
- Speaker: Muhammad Jamiruddin Sircar
- Deputy Speaker: Akhtar Hameed Siddiqui
- Leader of the House: Khaleda Zia
- Leader of the Opposition: Sheikh Hasina

The following is a list of Members of Parliament (MPs) elected to the Jatiya Sangsad (National Parliament of Bangladesh) from 300 Constituencies for the 8th Parliament of Bangladesh.

It includes both MPs elected at the 2001 general election, held on 1 October 2001. Nominated women's members for reserved seat and Those subsequently elected in by-elections.

== Members ==
=== Member of Parliament ===
Constituency		Name	Party
1	Panchagarh-1	Muhammad Jamiruddin Sircar	Bangladesh Nationalist Party
2	Panchagarh-2	Mozahar Hossain	Bangladesh Nationalist Party
3	Thakurgaon-1	Mirza Fakhrul Islam Alamgir	Bangladesh Nationalist Party
4	Thakurgaon-2	Dabirul Islam	Awami League
5	Thakurgaon-3	Hafiz Uddin Ahmed	IJOF
6	Dinajpur-1	Abdullah Al Kafi Died: 12 September 2005	Jamaat-e-Islami Bangladesh
6	Dinajpur-1	Manoranjan Shill Gopal By-election: December 2005	Independent
7	Dinajpur-2	Muhammad Mahbubur Rahman	Bangladesh Nationalist Party
8	Dinajpur-3	Khurshid Jahan Haq Died: 14 June 2006	Bangladesh Nationalist Party
9	Dinajpur-4	Akhtaruzzaman Mia	Bangladesh Nationalist Party
10	Dinajpur-5	Mostafizur Rahman Fizar	AL
11	Dinajpur-6	Azizur Rahman Chowdhury	Jamaat-e-Islami Bangladesh
12	Nilphamari-1	Hamida Banu Shova	Awami League
13	Nilphamari-2	Asaduzzaman Noor	Awami League
14	Nilphamari-3	Mizanur Rahman Chowdhury	Jamaat-e-Islami Bangladesh
15	Nilphamari-4	Amzad Hossain Sarker	Bangladesh Nationalist Party
16	Lalmonirhat-1	Motahar Hossain	Awami League
17	Lalmonirhat-2	Mujibur Rahman	IJOF
18	Lalmonirhat-3	Asadul Habib Dulu	Bangladesh Nationalist Party
19	Rangpur-1	Mashiur Rahaman Ranga	IJOF
20	Rangpur-2	Mohammad Ali Sarkar	IJOF
21	Rangpur-3	Ghulam Muhammed Quader	IJOF
22	Rangpur-4	Karim Uddin Bharsha	IJOF
23	Rangpur-5	Shah Md. Soliman Alam	IJOF
24	Rangpur-6	Nur Mohammad Mondal	IJOF
25	Kurigram-1	A.K.M. Mostafizur Rahman	IJOF
26	Kurigram-2	Tajul Islam Choudhury	IJOF
27	Kurigram-3	Md. Motiur Rahman	IJOF
28	Kurigram-4	Golam Habib Dulal	IJOF
29	Gaibandha-1	Abdul Aziz Mia	Jamaat-e-Islami Bangladesh
30	Gaibandha-2	Lutfor Rahman	Awami League
31	Gaibandha-3	Fazle Rabbi Chowdhury	IJOF
32	Gaibandha-4	Abdul Mottaleb Akanda Died: 11 March 2006	Bangladesh Nationalist Party
32	Gaibandha-4	Shamim Kaisar Lincoln By-election: May 2006	Bangladesh Nationalist Party
33	Gaibandha-5	Rowshan Ershad	IJOF
34	Joypurhat-1	Abdul Alim	Bangladesh Nationalist Party
35	Joypurhat-2	Abu Yusuf Mohammad Khalilur Rahman	Bangladesh Nationalist Party
36	Bogra-1	Kazi Rafiqul Islam	Bangladesh Nationalist Party
37	Bogra-2	Rezaul Bari Dina	Bangladesh Nationalist Party
38	Bogra-3	Abdul Momen Talukder	Bangladesh Nationalist Party
39	Bogra-4	Ziaul Haque Mollah	Bangladesh Nationalist Party
40	Bogra-5	Golam Mohammad Siraj	Bangladesh Nationalist Party
41	Bogra-6	Begum Khaleda Zia	Bangladesh Nationalist Party
42	Bogra-7	Helaluzzaman Talukder Lalu By-election: November 2001	Bangladesh Nationalist Party
43	Chapai Nawabganj-1	Shahjahan Miah	Bangladesh Nationalist Party
44	Chapai Nawabganj-2	Syed Monjur Hossain	Bangladesh Nationalist Party
45	Chapai Nawabganj-3	Harunur Rashid	Bangladesh Nationalist Party
46	Naogaon-1	Salek Chowdhury	Bangladesh Nationalist Party
47	Naogaon-2	Shamsuzzoha Khan	Bangladesh Nationalist Party
48	Naogaon-3	Akhtar Hameed Siddiqui	Bangladesh Nationalist Party
49	Naogaon-4	Shamsul Alam Pramanik	Bangladesh Nationalist Party
50	Naogaon-5	Abdul Jalil	Awami League
51	Naogaon-6	Alamgir Kabir	Bangladesh Nationalist Party
52	Rajshahi-1	Aminul Haq	Bangladesh Nationalist Party
53	Rajshahi-2	Mizanur Rahman Minu	Bangladesh Nationalist Party
54	Rajshahi-3	Abu Hena	Bangladesh Nationalist Party
55	Rajshahi-4	Nadim Mostafa	Bangladesh Nationalist Party
56	Rajshahi-5	Kabir Hossain	Bangladesh Nationalist Party
57	Natore-1	Fazlur Rahman Potol	Bangladesh Nationalist Party
58	Natore-2	Ruhul Quddus Talukdar (Dulu)	Bangladesh Nationalist Party
59	Natore-3	Kazi Golam Morshed	Bangladesh Nationalist Party
60	Natore-4	Mozammel Haque	Bangladesh Nationalist Party
61	Sirajganj-1	Mohammed Nasim	Awami League
62	Sirajganj-2	Iqbal Hassan Mahmood	Bangladesh Nationalist Party
63	Sirajganj-3	Abdul Mannan Talukder	Bangladesh Nationalist Party
64	Sirajganj-4	M Akbar Ali	Bangladesh Nationalist Party
65	Sirajganj-5	Mozammel Haque	Bangladesh Nationalist Party
66	Sirajganj-6	Manzur Quader	Bangladesh Nationalist Party
67	Sirajganj-7	MA Matin	Bangladesh Jatiya Party
68	Pabna-1	Motiur Rahman Nizami	Jamaat-e-Islami Bangladesh
69	Pabna-2	AKM Salim Reza Habib	Bangladesh Nationalist Party
70	Pabna-3	K. M. Anowarul Islam	Bangladesh Nationalist Party
71	Pabna-4	Shamsur Rahman Sherif	Awami League
72	Pabna-5	Abdus Sobhan	Jamaat-e-Islami Bangladesh
73	Meherpur-1	Masud Arun	Bangladesh Nationalist Party
74	Meherpur-2	Abdul Gani	Bangladesh Nationalist Party
75	Kushtia-1	Ahsanul Haq Mollah Died: 12 December 2003	Bangladesh Nationalist Party
75	Kushtia-1	Bachhu Mollah By-election: March 2004	Bangladesh Nationalist Party
76	Kushtia-2	Shahidul Islam	Bangladesh Nationalist Party
77	Kushtia-3	Sohrab Uddin	Bangladesh Nationalist Party
78	Kushtia-4	Syed Mehedi Ahmed Rumi	Bangladesh Nationalist Party
79	Chuadanga-1	Shahidul Islam Biswas	Bangladesh Nationalist Party
80	Chuadanga-2	Mozammel Haque	Bangladesh Nationalist Party
81	Jhenaidah-1	Abdul Hyee	Awami League
82	Jhenaidah-2	Mashiur Rahman	Bangladesh Nationalist Party
83	Jhenaidah-3	Shahidul Islam Master	Bangladesh Nationalist Party
84	Jhenaidah-4	Shahiduzzaman Beltu	Bangladesh Nationalist Party
85	Jessore-1	Ali Kadar	Bangladesh Nationalist Party
86	Jessore-2	Abu Sayeed Md. Shahadat Hussain	Jamaat-e-Islami Bangladesh
87	Jessore-3	Tariqul Islam	Bangladesh Nationalist Party
88	Jessore-4	M. M. Amin Uddin	Bangladesh Jatiya Party
89	Jessore-5	Muhammad Wakkas	Islami Oikya Jote
90	Jessore-6	ASHK Sadek	Awami League
91	Magura-1	Muhammad Serajul Akbar	Awami League
92	Magura-2	Quazi Kamal	Bangladesh Nationalist Party
93	Narail-1	Dhirendra Nath Saha By-election: January 2002	Bangladesh Nationalist Party
94	Narail-2	Shahidul Islam By-election: January 2002	Islami Oikya Jote
95	Bagerhat-1	Sheikh Helal Uddin	AL
96	Bagerhat-2	MAH Salim	Bangladesh Nationalist Party
97	Bagerhat-3	Talukder Abdul Khaleque	AL
98	Bagerhat-4	Abdus Sattar Akon	Jamaat-e-Islami Bangladesh
99	Khulna-1	Panchanan Biswas	AL
100	Khulna-2	Ali Asgar Lobi By-election: November 2001	Bangladesh Nationalist Party
101	Khulna-3	Ashraf Hossain	Bangladesh Nationalist Party
102	Khulna-4	M. Nurul Islam	Bangladesh Nationalist Party
103	Khulna-5	Mia Golam Parwar	Jamaat-e-Islami Bangladesh
104	Khulna-6	Shah Md. Ruhul Quddus	Jamaat-e-Islami Bangladesh
105	Satkhira-1	Habibul Islam Habib	Bangladesh Nationalist Party
106	Satkhira-2	Abdul Khaleque Mondal	Jamaat-e-Islami Bangladesh
107	Satkhira-3	AM Riasat Ali Biswas	Jamaat-e-Islami Bangladesh
108	Satkhira-4	Kazi Alauddin	Bangladesh Jatiya Party
109	Satkhira-5	Gazi Nazrul Islam	Jamaat-e-Islami Bangladesh
110	Barguna-1	Delwar Hossain	Independent
111	Barguna-2	Nurul Islam Moni	Bangladesh Nationalist Party
112	Barguna-3	M. Motiur Rahman Talukdar By-election: January 2002	Bangladesh Nationalist Party
113	Patuakhali-1	Altaf Hossain Chowdhury	Bangladesh Nationalist Party
114	Patuakhali-2	Shahidul Alam Talukder	Bangladesh Nationalist Party
115	Patuakhali-3	AKM Jahangir Hossain	AL
116	Patuakhali-4	Mahbubur Rahman	AL
117	Bhola-1	Mosharef Hossain Shahjahan	Bangladesh Nationalist Party
118	Bhola-2	Hafiz Ibrahim	Bangladesh Nationalist Party
119	Bhola-3	Hafizuddin Ahmed	Bangladesh Nationalist Party
120	Bhola-4	Nazimuddin Alam	Bangladesh Nationalist Party
121	Barisal-1	Zahir Uddin Swapan	Bangladesh Nationalist Party
122	Barisal-2	Syed Moazzem Hossain Alal	Bangladesh Nationalist Party
123	Barisal-3	Mosharraf Hossain Mongu	Bangladesh Nationalist Party
124	Barisal-4	Shah M. Abul Hussain	Bangladesh Nationalist Party
125	Barisal-5	Majibur Rahman Sarwar	Bangladesh Nationalist Party
126	Barisal-6	Abul Hossain Khan	Bangladesh Nationalist Party
127	Jhalokati-1	Shahjahan Omar	Bangladesh Nationalist Party
128	Jhalokati-2	Israt Sultana Elen Bhutto	Bangladesh Nationalist Party
129	Pirojpur-1	Delwar Hossain Sayeedi	Jamaat-e-Islami Bangladesh
130	Pirojpur-2	Anwar Hossain Manju	JP (Manju)
131	Pirojpur-3	Rustum Ali Faraji	Bangladesh Nationalist Party
132	Barisal with Pirojpur	Syed Shahidul Huque Jamal	Bangladesh Nationalist Party
133	Tangail-1	Mohammad Abdur Razzaque	AL
134	Tangail-2	Abdus Salam Pintu	Bangladesh Nationalist Party
135	Tangail-3	Lutfor Rahman Khan Azad	Bangladesh Nationalist Party
136	Tangail-4	Shajahan Siraj	Bangladesh Nationalist Party
137	Tangail-5	Mahmudul Hasan	Bangladesh Nationalist Party
138	Tangail-6	Gautam Chakroborty	Bangladesh Nationalist Party
139	Tangail-7	Md. Akabbar Hossain	AL
140	Tangail-8	Abdul Kader Siddique	KSJL
141	Jamalpur-1	M. Rashiduzzaman Millat	Bangladesh Nationalist Party
142	Jamalpur-2	Sultan Mahmud Babu	Bangladesh Nationalist Party
143	Jamalpur-3	Mirza Azam	AL
144	Jamalpur-4	Anwarul Kabir Talukdar	Bangladesh Nationalist Party
145	Jamalpur-5	Rezaul Karim Hira	AL
146	Sherpur-1	Md. Atiur Rahman Atik	AL
147	Sherpur-2	Zahed Ali	Bangladesh Nationalist Party
148	Sherpur-3	Mahmudul Haque Rubel	Bangladesh Nationalist Party
149	Mymensingh-1	Promode Mankin	AL
150	Mymensingh-2	Shah Shahid Sarwar	Bangladesh Nationalist Party
151	Mymensingh-3	Mozibur Rahman Fakir	AL
152	Mymensingh-4	Delwar Hossain Khan Dulu	Bangladesh Nationalist Party
153	Mymensingh-5	A. K. M. Mosharraf Hossain	Bangladesh Nationalist Party
154	Mymensingh-6	Shamsuddin Ahmad	Independent
155	Mymensingh-7	Abdul Matin Sarkar	AL
156	Mymensingh-8	Shah Nurul Kabir	Bangladesh Nationalist Party
157	Mymensingh-9	Khurram Khan Chowdhury	Bangladesh Nationalist Party
158	Mymensingh-10	Altaf Hossain Golandaz	AL
159	Mymensingh-11	Mohammed Amanullah	AL
160	Mymensingh with Netrokona	Mohammad Ali	Bangladesh Nationalist Party
161	Netrokona-1	Abdul Karim Abbasi	Bangladesh Nationalist Party
162	Netrokona-2	Abdul Momin Died: 16 July 2004	AL
162	Netrokona-2	Abu Abbas By-election: October 2004	Bangladesh Nationalist Party
163	Netrokona-3	Nurul Amin Talukdar Died: 4 June 2003	Bangladesh Nationalist Party
163	Netrokona-3	Khadija Amin By-election: August 2003	Bangladesh Nationalist Party
164	Netrokona-4	Lutfozzaman Babar	Bangladesh Nationalist Party
165	Kishoreganj-1	Alauddin Ahammad	AL
166	Kishoreganj-2	M. A. Mannan	AL
167	Kishoreganj-3	Sayed Ashraful Islam	AL
168	Kishoreganj-4	Osman Faruk	Bangladesh Nationalist Party
169	Kishoreganj-5	Mohammad Abdul Hamid	AL
170	Kishoreganj-6	Mujibur Rahman Monju	Bangladesh Nationalist Party
171	Kishoreganj-7	Zillur Rahman	AL
172	Manikganj-1	Khandaker Delwar Hossain	Bangladesh Nationalist Party
173	Manikganj-2	Samsuddin Ahmed By-election: November 2001	Independent
174	Manikganj-3	Harunur Rashid Khan Monno	Bangladesh Nationalist Party
175	Manikganj-4	Shamsul Islam Khan Died: 22 January 2006	Bangladesh Nationalist Party
175	Manikganj-4	Moinul Islam Khan By-election: May 2006	Bangladesh Nationalist Party
176	Munshiganj-1	A. Q. M. Badruddoza Chowdhury Become president: 14 November 2001	Bangladesh Nationalist Party
176	Munshiganj-1	Mahi B. Chowdhury By-election: January 2002; Resigned from BNP: 10 March 2004; By-election (Re-elected) from Bikalpa Dhara: June 2004	Bangladesh Nationalist Party
176	Munshiganj-1	Mahi B. Chowdhury By-election: January 2002; Resigned from BNP: 10 March 2004; By-election (Re-elected) from Bikalpa Dhara: June 2004	BDB (After by-election)
177	Munshiganj-2	Mizanur Rahman Sinha	Bangladesh Nationalist Party
178	Munshiganj-3	Shamsul Islam	Bangladesh Nationalist Party
179	Munshiganj-4	Md. Abdul Hai	Bangladesh Nationalist Party
180	Dhaka-1	Nazmul Huda	Bangladesh Nationalist Party
181	Dhaka-2	Abdul Mannan	Bangladesh Nationalist Party
182	Dhaka-3	Amanullah Aman	Bangladesh Nationalist Party
183	Dhaka-4	Salah Uddin Ahmed	Bangladesh Nationalist Party
184	Dhaka-5	Mohammad Quamrul Islam	Bangladesh Nationalist Party
185	Dhaka-6	Mirza Abbas	Bangladesh Nationalist Party
186	Dhaka-7	Sadeque Hossain Khoka	Bangladesh Nationalist Party
187	Dhaka-8	Nasiruddin Ahmed Pintu	Bangladesh Nationalist Party
188	Dhaka-9	Khandokar Mahbub Uddin Ahmad	Bangladesh Nationalist Party
189	Dhaka-10	Abdul Mannan Resigned: 10 March 2004	Bangladesh Nationalist Party
189	Dhaka-10	Mohammad Mosaddak Ali By-election: June 2004	Bangladesh Nationalist Party
190	Dhaka-11	S. A. Khaleque	Bangladesh Nationalist Party
191	Dhaka-12	Dewan Md. Salauddin	Bangladesh Nationalist Party
192	Dhaka-13	Ziaur Rahman Khan	Bangladesh Nationalist Party
193	Gazipur-1	Md. Rahamat Ali	AL
194	Gazipur-2	Ahsanullah Master Assassinated: 7 May 2004	AL
194	Gazipur-2	Zahid Ahsan Russel By-election: August 2004	AL
195	Gazipur-3	A.K.M. Fazlul Haque	Bangladesh Nationalist Party
196	Gazipur-4	Tanjim Ahmad Sohel Taj	AL
197	Narsingdi-1	Shamsuddin Ahmed Ishaq Died: 27 March 2005	Bangladesh Nationalist Party
197	Narsingdi-1	Khairul Kabir Khokon By-election: June 2005	Bangladesh Nationalist Party
198	Narsingdi-2	Abdul Moyeen Khan	Bangladesh Nationalist Party
199	Narsingdi-3	Abdul Mannan Bhuiyan	Bangladesh Nationalist Party
200	Narsingdi-4	Sardar Shakhawat Hossain Bokul	Bangladesh Nationalist Party
201	Narsingdi-5	Rajiuddin Ahmed Raju	AL
202	Narayanganj-1	Abdul Matin Chowdhury	Bangladesh Nationalist Party
203	Narayanganj-2	Ataur Rahman Khan Angur	Bangladesh Nationalist Party
204	Narayanganj-3	Rezaul Karim Mannan	Bangladesh Nationalist Party
205	Narayanganj-4	Mohammad Giasuddin	Bangladesh Nationalist Party
206	Narayanganj-5	Abul Kalam	Bangladesh Nationalist Party
207	Rajbari-1	Ali Newaz Mahmud Khaiyam	Bangladesh Nationalist Party
208	Rajbari-2	Nasirul Haque Sabu	Bangladesh Nationalist Party
209	Faridpur-1	Kazi Sirajul Islam Quit from Awami League & seat vacant: 4 June 2005	AL
209	Faridpur-1	Shah Mohammad Abu Zafar	Bangladesh Nationalist Party
210	Faridpur-2	KM Obaidur Rahman	Bangladesh Nationalist Party
211	Faridpur-3	Chowdhury Kamal Ibne Yusuf	Bangladesh Nationalist Party
212	Faridpur-4	Chowdhury Akmal Ibne Yusuf By-election: November 2001	Bangladesh Nationalist Party
213	Faridpur-5	Kazi Zafarullah	AL
214	Gopalganj-1	Faruk Khan	AL
215	Gopalganj-2	Sheikh Selim	AL
216	Gopalganj-3	Sheikh Hasina	AL
217	Madaripur-1	Noor-E-Alam Chowdhury Liton	AL
218	Madaripur-2	Shajahan Khan	AL
219	Madaripur-3	Syed Abul Hossain	AL
220	Shariatpur-1	K. M. Hemayet Ullah Auranga	Independent
221	Shariatpur-2	Shawkat Ali	AL
222	Shariatpur-3	Abdur Razzaq	AL
223	Sunamganj-1	Nozir Hossain	Bangladesh Nationalist Party
224	Sunamganj-2	Suranjit Sengupta	AL
225	Sunamganj-3	Abdus Samad Azad Died: 27 April 2005	AL
225	Sunamganj-3	Shahinur Pasha Chowdhury By-election: July 2005	Islami Oikya Jote
226	Sunamganj-4	Fazlul Haque Aspia	Bangladesh Nationalist Party
227	Sunamganj-5	Kalim Uddin Ahmed	Bangladesh Nationalist Party
228	Sylhet-1	Saifur Rahman	Bangladesh Nationalist Party
229	Sylhet-2	M Ilias Ali	Bangladesh Nationalist Party
230	Sylhet-3	Shafi Ahmed Chowdhury	Bangladesh Nationalist Party
231	Sylhet-4	Dildar Hossain Selim	Bangladesh Nationalist Party
232	Sylhet-5	Farid Uddin Chowdhury	Jamaat-e-Islami Bangladesh
233	Sylhet-6	Syed Makbul Hossain	Independent
234	Moulvibazar-1	Ebadur Rahman Chowdhury	Bangladesh Nationalist Party
235	Moulvibazar-2	MM Shahin	Independent
236	Moulvibazar-3	M. Naser Rahman By-election: November 2001	Bangladesh Nationalist Party
237	Moulvibazar-4	Md. Abdus Shahid	AL
238	Habiganj-1	Dewan Farid Gazi	AL
239	Habiganj-2	Najmul Hasan Zahed	AL
240	Habiganj-3	Shah A M S Kibria Assassinated: 27 January 2005	AL
240	Habiganj-3	Abu Lais Md. Mubin Chowdhury By-election: April 2005	Bangladesh Nationalist Party
241	Habiganj-4	Enamul Haque Mostafa Shahid	AL
242	Brahmanbaria-1	Mohammad Sayedul Haque	AL
243	Brahmanbaria-2	Fazlul Haque Amini	Islami Oikya Jote
244	Brahmanbaria-3	Haroon Al Rashid	Bangladesh Nationalist Party
245	Brahmanbaria-4	Mushfiqur Rahman	Bangladesh Nationalist Party
246	Brahmanbaria-5	Kazi Md. Anowar Hossain	Bangladesh Jatiya Party
247	Brahmanbaria-6	Abdul Khaleque	Bangladesh Nationalist Party
248	Comilla-1	M. K. Anwar	Bangladesh Nationalist Party
249	Comilla-2	Khandaker Mosharraf Hossain	Bangladesh Nationalist Party
250	Comilla-3	Kazi Shah Mofazzal Hossain Kaikobad	Bangladesh Nationalist Party
251	Comilla-4	Manjurul Ahsan Munshi	Bangladesh Nationalist Party
252	Comilla-5	Mohammad Yunus	Bangladesh Nationalist Party
253	Comilla-6	Redwan Ahmed	Bangladesh Nationalist Party
254	Comilla-7	Abu Taher Died: 23 September 2004	Bangladesh Nationalist Party
254	Comilla-7	Zakaria Taher Sumon By-election: December 2004	Bangladesh Nationalist Party
255	Comilla-8	Akbar Hossain Died: 25 June 2006	Bangladesh Nationalist Party
256	Comilla-9	Monirul Haq Chowdhury	Bangladesh Nationalist Party
257	Comilla-10	Anwarul Azim	Bangladesh Nationalist Party
258	Comilla-11	Abdul Gafur Bhuiyan	Bangladesh Nationalist Party
259	Comilla-12	Syed Abdullah Muhammad Taher	Jamaat-e-Islami Bangladesh
260	Chandpur-1	A. N. M. Ehsanul Hoque Milan	Bangladesh Nationalist Party
261	Chandpur-2	Md. Nurul Huda	Bangladesh Nationalist Party
262	Chandpur-3	G. M. Fazlul Haque	Bangladesh Nationalist Party
263	Chandpur-4	SA Sultan	Bangladesh Nationalist Party
264	Chandpur-5	M. A. Matin	Bangladesh Nationalist Party
265	Chandpur-6	Alamgir Hyder Khan	Bangladesh Nationalist Party
266	Feni-1	Sayeed Iskander By-election: November 2001	Bangladesh Nationalist Party
267	Feni-2	Joynal Abedin	Bangladesh Nationalist Party
268	Feni-3	Mosharraf Hossain	Bangladesh Nationalist Party
269	Noakhali-1	Zainul Abdin Farroque	Bangladesh Nationalist Party
270	Noakhali-2	M. A. Hashem	Bangladesh Nationalist Party
271	Noakhali-3	Mahbubur Rahman	Bangladesh Nationalist Party
272	Noakhali-4	Md. Shahjahan	Bangladesh Nationalist Party
273	Noakhali-5	Moudud Ahmed	Bangladesh Nationalist Party
274	Noakhali-6	Mohammad Ali	Independent
275	Lakshmipur-1	Ziaul Haque Zia	Bangladesh Nationalist Party
276	Lakshmipur-2	Abul Khair Bhuiyan By-election: November 2001	Bangladesh Nationalist Party
277	Lakshmipur-3	Shahid Uddin Chowdhury Anee	Bangladesh Nationalist Party
278	Lakshmipur-4	A. B. M. Ashraf Uddin	Bangladesh Nationalist Party
279	Chittagong-1	Mohamad Ali Jinnah	Bangladesh Nationalist Party
280	Chittagong-2	L. K. Siddiqui	Bangladesh Nationalist Party
281	Chittagong-3	Mostafa Kamal Pasha	Bangladesh Nationalist Party
282	Chittagong-4	Rafiqul Anwar	AL
283	Chittagong-5	Syed Wahidul Alam	Bangladesh Nationalist Party
284	Chittagong-6	A. B. M. Fazle Karim Chowdhury	AL
285	Chittagong-7	Salahuddin Quader Chowdhury	Bangladesh Nationalist Party
286	Chittagong-8	Amir Khasru Mahmud Chowdhury	Bangladesh Nationalist Party
287	Chittagong-9	Abdullah Al Noman	Bangladesh Nationalist Party
288	Chittagong-10	Morshed Khan	Bangladesh Nationalist Party
289	Chittagong-11	Gazi Shahjahan Jwel	Bangladesh Nationalist Party
290	Chittagong-12	Sarwar Jamal Nizam	Bangladesh Nationalist Party
291	Chittagong-13	Oli Ahmad	Bangladesh Nationalist Party
292	Chittagong-14	Shahjahan Chowdhury	Jamaat-e-Islami Bangladesh
293	Chittagong-15	Jafrul Islam Chowdhury	Bangladesh Nationalist Party
294	Cox's Bazar-1	Salahuddin Ahmed	Bangladesh Nationalist Party
295	Cox's Bazar-2	Alamgir Mohammad Mahfuzullah Farid	Bangladesh Nationalist Party
296	Cox's Bazar-3	Mohammad Sahiduzzaman	Bangladesh Nationalist Party
297	Cox's Bazar-4	Shahjahan Chowdhury	Bangladesh Nationalist Party
298	Khagrachari	Wadud Bhuiyan	Bangladesh Nationalist Party
299	Rangamati	Moni Swapan Dewan	Bangladesh Nationalist Party
300	Bandarban	Ushwe Sing	AL

=== Members of Reserved Women's Seat ===
Women's Seat		Name	Party
301	Women's Seat-1	Noor Afroze Begum Jyoti	Bangladesh Nationalist Party
302	Women's Seat-2	Abeda Chowdhury	Bangladesh Nationalist Party
303	Women's Seat-3	Yasmin Ara Haque	Bangladesh Nationalist Party
304	Women's Seat-4	Khaleda Panna	Bangladesh Nationalist Party
305	Women's Seat-5	Ferdous Akhter Wahida	Bangladesh Nationalist Party
306	Women's Seat-6	Bilkis Akhter Jahan Shireen	Bangladesh Nationalist Party
307	Women's Seat-7	Reena Parveen	Bangladesh Nationalist Party
308	Women's Seat-8	Shamme Sher	Bangladesh Nationalist Party
309	Women's Seat-9	Khondaker Nurjahan Yesmin Bulbul	Bangladesh Nationalist Party
310	Women's Seat-10	Khaleda Rabbani	Bangladesh Nationalist Party
311	Women's Seat-11	Chaman Ara Begum	Bangladesh Nationalist Party
312	Women's Seat-12	Jahan Panna	Bangladesh Nationalist Party
313	Women's Seat-13	Tasmin Rana	Bangladesh Nationalist Party
314	Women's Seat-14	Noore-Ara-Shafa	Bangladesh Nationalist Party
315	Women's Seat-15	Bilkiss Islam	Bangladesh Nationalist Party
316	Women's Seat-16	Begum Rosy Kabir	Bangladesh Nationalist Party
317	Women's Seat-17	Shamsunnahar Khwaja Ahsanullah	Bangladesh Nationalist Party
318	Women's Seat-18	Rowshan Ara Farid	Bangladesh Nationalist Party
319	Women's Seat-19	Rabeya Chowdhury	Bangladesh Nationalist Party
320	Women's Seat-20	Raihan Akhter Banu Roni	Bangladesh Nationalist Party
321	Women's Seat-21	Rehana Akter Ranu	Bangladesh Nationalist Party
322	Women's Seat-22	Rokeya Ahmed Lucky	Bangladesh Nationalist Party
323	Women's Seat-23	Shahriar Akhter Bulu	Bangladesh Nationalist Party
324	Women's Seat-24	Shahana Rahman Rani	Bangladesh Nationalist Party
325	Women's Seat-25	Sarwari Rahman	Bangladesh Nationalist Party
326	Women's Seat-26	Sultana Ahmed	Bangladesh Nationalist Party
327	Women's Seat-27	Selima Rahman	Bangladesh Nationalist Party
328	Women's Seat-28	Syeda Nargis Ali	Bangladesh Nationalist Party
329	Women's Seat-29	Hosne Ara Gias	Bangladesh Nationalist Party
330	Women's Seat-30	Helen Zerin Khan	Bangladesh Nationalist Party
331	Women's Seat-31	Amena Begum	Jamaat-e-Islami Bangladesh
332	Women's Seat-32	Shahanara Begum	Jamaat-e-Islami Bangladesh
333	Women's Seat-33	Sultana Razia	Jamaat-e-Islami Bangladesh
334	Women's Seat-34	Merina Rahman	Jatiya Party (Ershad)
335	Women's Seat-35	Syeda Razia Faiz	Jatiya Party (Ershad)
336	Women's Seat-36	Navila Chowdhury	Bangladesh Jatiya Party
337	Women's Seat-37	Khodeza Emdad Lata	Bangladesh Nationalist Party
338	Women's Seat-38	Newaz Halima Arli	Bangladesh Nationalist Party
339	Women's Seat-39	Fahima Hossain Jubly	Bangladesh Nationalist Party
340	Women's Seat-40	Rasheda Begum Hira	Bangladesh Nationalist Party
341	Women's Seat-41	Razina Islam	Bangladesh Nationalist Party
342	Women's Seat-42	Saimun Begum	Bangladesh Nationalist Party
343	Women's Seat-43	Rokeya Begum	Jamaat-e-Islami Bangladesh
344	Women's Seat-44	Naima Sultana	Islami Oikya Jote
345	Women's Seat-45	Noor-E-Hasna Lily Chowdhury	Jatiya Party (Ershad)
