= Nazrul Islam (disambiguation) =

Nazrul Islam is a Bengali Muslim masculine given name of Arabic origin meaning vow to Islam. Notable bearers of the name include:

- Kazi Nazrul Islam (1899–1976), Bangladeshi poet, musician, revolutionary and national poet of Bangladesh
- Nazrul Islam Babu (lyricist), Bangladeshi lyricist
- Chashi Nazrul Islam (1941–2015), Bangladeshi film director and producer
- Jamal Nazrul Islam (1939–2013), Bangladeshi physicist, mathematician and astronomer
- S. M. Nazrul Islam, Bangladeshi engineering academic
- Syed Nazrul Islam (1925–1975), Bangladeshi politician and statesman
- Nazrul Islam Khan, Bangladeshi politician
- Nazrul Islam (Bhola politician), Bangladeshi politician
- Nazrul Islam (Indian politician), (1949–2023)
- M. M. Nazrul Islam, Bangladeshi academic and politician
- Nazrul Islam (Mymensingh-5 politician)
- Nazrul Islam (Chittagong politician)
- Nazrul Islam (Indian politician)
- Nazrul Islam (Jessore politician)
- Nazrul Islam (Mymensingh-3 politician)
- Nazrul Islam (Sherpur politician)
- Nazrul Islam Babu, Bangladeshi politician
- Nazrul Islam (general), Bangladesh Army officer
- Muhammad Nazrul Islam, Bangladesh Army officer and politician
- Muhammad Nazrul Islam (air officer), Bangladesh Air Force officer
- Md. Nazrul Islam Chowdhury, Bangladeshi politician
- Nazrul Islam Manju, Bangladeshi politician
- Nazrul Islam Ritu, Bangladeshi activist and politician
- Md. Nazrul Islam (ambassador to Bahrain)
- Md. Nazrul Islam (ambassador to Ethiopia)
- Md. Nazrul Islam Talukder, Bangladesh Supreme Court judge

== See also ==
- Kazi Nazrul Islam (disambiguation)
- Md. Najrul Islam, Indian politician
