= Bilkis =

Bilkis may refer to:

- Bilkis Akhter Jahan Shireen, a Bangladeshi politician
- Bilkis Bano, a victim of the 2002 Gujarat riots
- Bilkis Dadi, an Indian rights activist (birth name: Bilkis Bano)
- Bilkis Islam, a Bangladeshi politician
- Queen of Sheba, also known as Bilkis
