= ABM Mosharraf Hossain =

Bangladeshi politician

Member of Parliament for Patuakhali-4
- Incumbent
- Assumed office 17 February 2026
- Preceded by: Muhibur Rahman Muhib

Personal details
- Born: Patuakhali District, Bangladesh
- Party: Bangladesh Nationalist Party

ABM Mosharraf Hossain is a Bangladeshi politician and Member of Parliament. In the 2026 Bangladeshi general election, he won from the Patuakhali-4 constituency as a candidate of the Bangladesh Nationalist Party.

== Political career ==
ABM Mosharraf Hossain was the Social Welfare Secretary of Kabi Jasimuddin Hall Students' Union at the University of Dhaka. Later, he served as the president of the Dhaka University unit of Jatiyatabadi Chhatra Dal, the Organizing Secretary of Chhatra Dal, and eventually became the first Joint Convener of Chhatra Dal at the final stage of his student political career. He also served as the president of Kalapara Upazila BNP. He contested the 2008 and 2018 National Parliament elections as a BNP candidate but was defeated.

Trening Affaire Secretary Bnp 2016 To present
