= Shamsul Huda Khan =

Bangladeshi politician

- শামসুল হুদা খান

Member of Parliament for Jhenaidah-3
- In office 1988–1990
- Preceded by: ASM Mozammel Haque
- Succeeded by: Shahidul Islam Master

Personal details
- Born: Jhenaidah District
- Died: 6 July 2006
- Party: Jatiya Party

Shamsul Huda Khan (died 6 July 2006) was a politician of Jhenaidah District of Bangladesh and member of parliament for the Jhenaidah-3 constituency in 1988.

== Career ==
Khan was elected to parliament from Jhenaidah-3 constituency in as a Jatiya Party candidate in 1988 Bangladeshi general election. He was the chairman of Maheshpur municipality.
