= M. Nazim Uddin Al Azad =

Bangladeshi politician

Member of Bangladesh Parliament

Member of Parliament for Jessore-10
- In office 18 February 1979 – 12 February 1982

Member of Parliament for Jessore-4
- In office 1988–1990
- Preceded by: Shah Hadiizzzaman
- Succeeded by: Shah Hadiizzzaman

Personal details
- Party: Bikalpa Dhara Bangladesh; Jatiya Party

M. Nazim Uddin Al Azad is a Bangladeshi politician, journalist and former minister who was a member of parliament for the then Jessore-10 and Jessore-4 constituencies.

== Career ==
Azad was elected to parliament from Jessore-10 as a Bangladesh Nationalist Party candidate in 1979. He was elected to parliament from Jessore-4 as an independent candidate in 1988. He was a former minister of religion and former minister of water resources.
