= Motiar =

Motiar is a given name. People with this name include:

- Motiar Rahman (born 1958), Bangladeshi politician
- Md. Motiar Rahman, Bangladeshi politician
