= Abdul Baten (Patuakhali politician) =

Bangladeshi politician

State Minister of Education
- In office 11 October 1978 – 15 April 1979
- Preceded by: Kazi Zafar Ahmed
- Succeeded by: Shah Azizur Rahman

Member of Parliament
- In office 18 February 1979 – 24 March 1982
- Preceded by: Kazi Abul Kashem
- Succeeded by: Abdur Razzak Khan
- Constituency: Patuakhali-4

Personal details
- Party: Bangladesh Nationalist Party

Abdul Baten is a Bangladesh Nationalist Party politician and a former member of parliament for Patuakhali-4.

== Career ==
Baten was elected to parliament from Patuakhali-4 as a Bangladesh Nationalist Party candidate in 1979.
