= Munshiganj-1 =

Constituency of Bangladesh's Jatiya Sangsad

Coordinates: 23.57°N 90.37°E

- Constituency for the Jatiya Sangsad
- District: Munshiganj District
- Division: Dhaka Division
- Electorate: 545,519 (2026)

Current constituency
- Created: 1984
- Party: Bangladesh Nationalist Party
- Member: Sheikh Md. Abdullah
- ← 170 Manikganj-3 172 Munshiganj-2 →

Munshiganj-1 is a constituency represented in the Jatiya Sangsad (National Parliament) of Bangladesh since 2026 by Sheikh Md. Abdullah of the Bangladesh Nationalist Party.

== Boundaries ==
The constituency encompasses Sirajdikhan and Sreenagar upazilas.

== History ==
The constituency was created in 1984 from a Dhaka constituency when the former Dhaka District was split into six districts: Manikganj, Munshiganj, Dhaka, Gazipur, Narsingdi, and Narayanganj.

Ahead of the 2008 general election, the Election Commission redrew constituency boundaries to reflect population changes revealed by the 2001 Bangladesh census. The 2008 redistricting reduced the number of seats in the district from four to three, making each of the surviving three larger.

== Members of Parliament ==
Election	Member	Party
1986	Shah Moazzem Hossain	Jatiya Party
1991	A. Q. M. Badruddoza Chowdhury	Bangladesh Nationalist Party
Feb 1996	A. Q. M. Badruddoza Chowdhury	Bangladesh Nationalist Party
Jun 1996	A. Q. M. Badruddoza Chowdhury	Bangladesh Nationalist Party
2001	A. Q. M. Badruddoza Chowdhury	Bangladesh Nationalist Party
2002 by-election	Mahi B. Chowdhury	Bangladesh Nationalist Party
2004 by-election	Mahi B. Chowdhury	Bikalpa Dhara
2008	Sukumar Ranjan Ghosh	Awami League
2018	Mahi B. Chowdhury	Bikalpa Dhara
2024	Mohiuddin Ahmed	Awami League
2026	Sheikh Md. Abdullah	Bangladesh Nationalist Party

== Elections ==
=== Elections in the 2020s ===
General Election 2026: Munshiganj-1
Party	Candidate	Votes	%	±%
BNP	Sheikh Md. Abdullah	167,562	54.1	N/A
Jamaat	AKM Fakhruddin Raji	101,568	32.8	N/A
Independent	Mohammad Momin Ali	30,678	9.9	N/A
IAB	Md. Atiqur Rahman Khan	9,039	2.9	N/A
CPB	Abdur Rahman	443	0.1	N/A
IBB	Rokeya Akter	320	0.1	N/A
Majority		65,994	21.3	N/A
Turnout		309,610	56.8	N/A
Registered electors		545,519		
BNP gain from AL				

=== Elections in the 2010s ===
General Election 2014: Munshiganj-1
Party	Candidate	Votes	%	±%
AL	Sukumar Ranjan Ghosh	196,183	96.3	+46.3
JP(E)	Nur Mohammad	6,957	3.4	N/A
Jatiya Samajtantrik Dal-JSD	AKM Nasiruzzaman Khan	570	0.3	N/A
Majority		189,226	92.9	+77.3
Turnout		203,710	53.6	−31.7
AL hold				

=== Elections in the 2000s ===
General Election 2008: Munshiganj-1
Party	Candidate	Votes	%	±%
AL	Sukumar Ranjan Ghosh	144,159	50.0	
BNP	Shah Moazzam Hossain	99,233	34.4	
BDB	A. Q. M. Badruddoza Chowdhury	37,709	13.1	
IAB	Md. Mahiuddin Mazi	6,333	2.2	
BTF	Golam Mostofa Santo	662	0.2	
Majority		44,926	15.6	
Turnout		288,096	85.3	
AL gain from BDB				

Mahi B. Chowdhury resigned from parliament on 10 March 2004 to form new political party Bikalpa Dhara Bangladesh with his father, A. Q. M. Badruddoza Chowdhury. Mahi's resignation triggered a June 2004 by-election, which Mahi won as a Bikalpa Dhara Bangladesh candidate, defeating his nearest rival, BNP candidate Momin Ali, by a greater than two-to-one margin.

In November 2001, A. Q. M. Badruddoza Chowdhury became President of Bangladesh, vacating his parliamentary seat. Mahi B. Chowdhury, his son, stood as a BNP candidate in the resulting 2002 by-election, and was elected.

General Election 2001: Munshiganj-1
Party	Candidate	Votes	%	±%
BNP	A. Q. M. Badruddoza Chowdhury	94,412	58.1	+7.6
AL	Sukumar Ranjan Ghosh	64,994	45.0	+15.7
IJOF	Shah Moazzem Hossain	2,505	1.5	N/A
JSD	Md. Alauddin Bhuiya	148	0.1	−0.2
Independent	Asaduzzaman	131	0.1	N/A
Jatiya Party (M)	Delowar Hossain Visti	130	0.1	N/A
Independent	Md. Moniruzzaman	60	0.0	N/A
Independent	Bulbul Ahmed	59	0.0	N/A
Independent	Md. Mahbub-Ul-Alam	44	0.0	N/A
Majority		29,418	18.1	−3.1
Turnout		162,483	72.7	−6.0
BNP hold				

=== Elections in the 1990s ===
General Election June 1996: Munshiganj-1
Party	Candidate	Votes	%	±%
BNP	A. Q. M. Badruddoza Chowdhury	62,787	50.5	−10.9
AL	K. S. Nabi	36,473	29.4	−5.4
JP(E)	Shah Moazzem Hossain	20,120	16.2	+15.9
IOJ	Dewan Maksud Ali Shah Nuri	2,189	1.8	N/A
Zaker Party	Murshedul Ahsan	1,405	1.1	−1.9
Jamaat	M. A. Latif Hawladar	632	0.5	N/A
JSD	AKM Nasiruzzaman Khan	317	0.3	+0.1
Bangladesh Muslim League (Jamir Ali)	Md. Moniruzzaman	194	0.2	N/A
Jatiya Samajtantrik Dal-JSD	Md. Ruhul Amin Bhuiyan	171	0.1	N/A
Majority		26,314	21.2	−5.4
Turnout		124,288	78.7	+19.8
BNP hold				

General Election 1991: Munshiganj-1
Party	Candidate	Votes	%	±%
BNP	A. Q. M. Badruddoza Chowdhury	75,099	61.4	
AL	A. R. Khandokar	42,583	34.8	
Zaker Party	Murshedul Ahsan	3,661	3.0	
JP(E)	Shah Moazzem Hossain	372	0.3	
JSD	Adilur Rahman Khan	249	0.2	
Independent	Shamsul Haq	196	0.2	
Bangladesh National Congress	S. M. Tofazzal Hossain	95	0.1	
Majority		32,516	26.6	
Turnout		122,255	58.9	
BNP gain from JP(E)				
