= Golam Sarwar Milon =

Bangladeshi politician (1957–2026)

- গোলাম সারোয়ার মিলন

Member of Bangladesh Parliament
- In office 1986–1988
- In office 1988–1990

Personal details
- Born: 6 November 1957 Dhaka, East Pakistan, Pakistan
- Died: 26 April 2026 (aged 68) Dhaka, Bangladesh
- Party: Bikalpa Dhara Bangladesh (2018–2026); Jatiya Party (Ershad)

Golam Sarwar Milon (Bengali: গোলাম সারোয়ার মিলন; 6 November 1957 – 26 April 2026) was a Bangladeshi Jatiya Party (Ershad) politician who was a member of parliament for Manikganj-4.

== Life and career ==
Milon was elected to parliament from Manikganj-4 as a Jatiya Party candidate in 1986 and 1988.

He was the first president of Bangladesh Jatiotabadi Chatra Dal. He was a state minister in the cabinet of President Hossain Mohammad Ershad. He joined Bikalpa Dhara Bangladesh in October 2018.

Milon died in Dhaka on 26 April 2026, at the age of 68.
