= Rushanara =

Rushanara (Bengali: রওশন আরা), also spelled Rawshan Ara or Rowshan Ara, is a feminine given name. Notable people with this name include:

- Rawshan Ara, a Bangladeshi actress
- Rawshan Ara Bachchu (1932–2019), a Bangladeshi activist
- Rawshan Ara Mustafiz, a Bangladeshi singer
- Rowshan Ara Mannan (born 1948), a Bangladeshi politician
- Rowshan Ara Farid, a Bangladeshi former politician
- Rushanara Ali (born 1975), a British politician
