= Md. Nobi Newaz =

Bangladeshi politician

Nobi Newaz
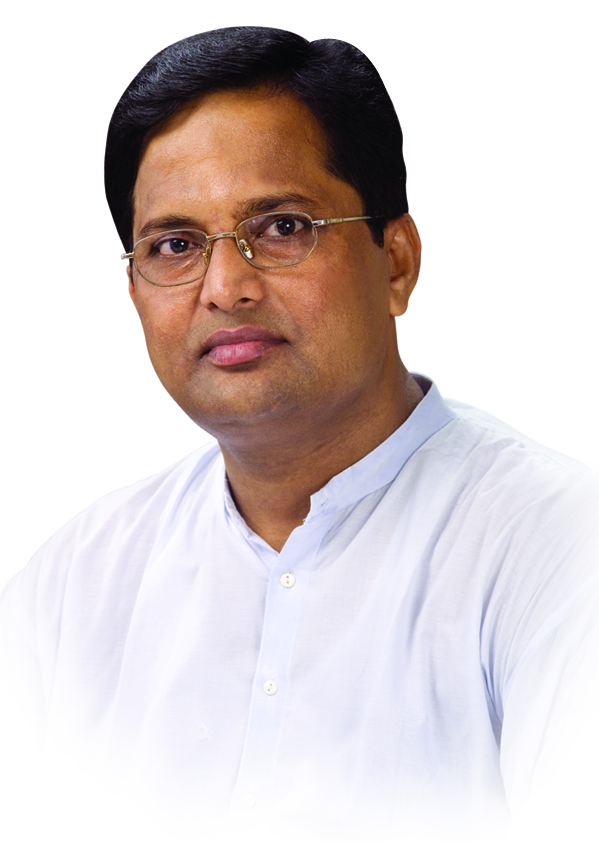

Member of Parliament
- In office 2014–2019
- Preceded by: Shafiqul Azam Khan
- Succeeded by: Shafiqul Azam Khan

Personal details
- Born: 9 February 1966 (age 60) Jhenaidah
- Party: Bangladesh Awami League

Md. Nobi Newaz is a Bangladeshi politician. He is a former Awami League member of parliament from Jhenaidah-3.

== Birth and education ==
Newaz was born on 9 February 1966. He graduated high school with a HSC.

== Career ==
Newaz was elected to Parliament on 5 January 2014 from Jhenaidah-3 as an Awami League candidate. He is a Member of the Parliamentary Standing Committee on Environment and Forests Ministry.

Awami League chose to nominate Shafiqul Azam Khan over Newaz in 2018.

On 11 April 2026, Newaz was detained by the Detective Branch and was sent to jail in case filed over death of a protestor in the July 2024 uprising against the Sheikh Hasina led Awami League government.
