= Sheikh Md. Abdullah =

Bangladesh politician

Members of Parliament
- Preceded by: Mohiuddin Ahmed
- Constituency: Munshiganj-1

Personal details
- Party: Bangladesh Nationalist Party
- Occupation: Politician

Sheikh Md. Abdullah is a Bangladeshi Bangladesh Nationalist Party who is an incumbent member of Parliament from the Munshiganj-1 constituency.
