= Mustafa Jamal =

Bangladeshi politician

Member of Bangladesh Parliament
- In office 1988–1990
- Preceded by: Samsul Huda Bachchu
- Succeeded by: Shamsuddin Ahmed Ishaq

Mustafa Jamal (Bengali: মুস্তাফা জামাল) is a politician in Bangladesh and a former member of parliament for Narsingdi-1.

== Career ==
Jamal was elected to parliament from Narsingdi-1 as a combined opposition candidate in 1988. He contested the 5th parliamentary election as a candidate of Jatiya Party and lost to Shamsuddin Ahmed Ishaq of the Bangladesh Nationalist Party.
