= Anwarul Islam (Patuakhali politician) =

Bangladeshi politician

- আনোয়ারুল ইসলাম

Member of Parliament for Patuakhali-4
- In office 27 February 1991 – 15 February 1996
- Preceded by: Abdur Razzak Khan
- Succeeded by: Mostafizur Rahman
- In office 12 June 1996 – 1 October 2001
- Succeeded by: Mahbubur Rahman

Personal details
- Born: Patuakhali District
- Party: Bangladesh Awami League

Anwarul Islam was a physician, politician of Patuakhali District of Bangladesh, and former member of parliament for the Patuakhali-4 constituency in 1991 and June 1996.

== Early life ==
Anwarul Islam was born in Patuakhali district. His son, Abdullah Al Mahmoud Liton, is the former organizing secretary of the United States branch of the Awami League and co-secretary of the central subcommittee.

== Career ==
Anwarul was elected as a member of parliament for the Patuakhali-4 constituency as a candidate of Bangladesh Awami League in the fifth parliamentary elections of 1991 and the seventh parliamentary elections of 12 June 1996. He was defeated as an independent candidate from Patuakhali-4 constituency in the 8th parliamentary elections of 2001.

== Death ==
Anwarul died in 2024. His house was vandalized on 21 November 2026 from a rally of the Bangladesh Nationalist Party.
