= Nur Mohammad (Munshiganj politician) =

Bangladeshi politician

- নূর মোহাম্মদ

Member of Parliament for Munshiganj-4
- In office 3 March 1988 – 6 December 1990
- Preceded by: Mohiuddin Ahmed
- Succeeded by: Md. Abdul Hai

Personal details
- Born: Munshiganj
- Party: Jatiya Party

Nur Mohammad is a politician from Munshiganj District of Bangladesh. He was elected member of parliament for Munshiganj-4 in the 1988 Bangladeshi general election.

== Career ==
Nur Mohammad was elected member of parliament for the Munshiganj-4 constituency as an Jatiya Party candidate in the 1988 Bangladeshi general election.

He was elected to a second term as chairman of Jamuna Bank in 2022.
