= Ranajit Kumar Roy =

Bangladeshi politician

- রণজিত কুমার রায়

Member of the Bangladesh Parliament for Jessore-4
- In office 25 January 2009 – 29 January 2024
- Preceded by: M. M. Amin Uddin
- Succeeded by: Enamul Haque Babul

Personal details
- Born: 1 February 1955 (age 71)
- Party: Bangladesh Awami League

Ranajit Kumar Roy (born 1 February 1955) is a Bangladesh Awami League politician and a former Jatiya Sangsad member representing the Jessore-4 constituency.

== Early life ==
Roy was born on 1 February 1955. He has studied up to H.S.C or grade 12.

== Career ==
Roy was elected to Parliament in 2008 from Jessore-4 as an Awami League candidate.

Roy was re-elected to Parliament in 2014 from Jessore-4 as an Awami League candidate.

Roy was re-elected to Parliament in 2019 from Jessore-4 as an Awami League candidate with 273,234 votes while his nearest rival, TS Ayub of Bangladesh Nationalist Party, received 30,874. His nomination was opposed by Awami League activists from Jessore who described him as corrupt at a press conference at the Dhaka Reporters' Unity; allegations he has refuted.
