= Kazi Abul Kashem =

Bangladeshi politician

Member of Bangladesh Parliament
- In office 1973–1979
- Succeeded by: Abdul Baten

Personal details
- Party: Bangladesh Awami League

Kazi Abul Kashem is a Bangladesh Awami League politician and a former member of parliament for Patuakhali-4.

== Career ==
Kashem was elected to parliament from Patuakhali-4 as a Bangladesh Awami League candidate in 1973. Kazi Abul Kashem Stadium was named after him.
