= Mostafizur Rahman (Patuakhali politician) =

Bangladeshi politician

- মুস্তাফিজুর রহমান

Member of Parliament for Patuakhali-4
- In office 15 February 1996 – 12 June 1996
- Preceded by: Anwarul Islam
- Succeeded by: Anwarul Islam

Personal details
- Born: Patuakhali District
- Party: Islami Andolan Bangladesh
- Other political affiliations: Bangladesh Nationalist Party (1996–2025)

Mostafizur Rahman is a Bangladeshi physician and politician who became the member of parliament for the Patuakhali-4 constituency in February 1996.

== Career ==
Rahman is a former president of BNP's Kalapara upazila and former chairman of Kalapara upazila. He was elected a member of parliament from Patuakhali-4 as a Bangladesh Nationalist Party candidate in 15 February 1996 Bangladeshi general election. He was defeated by Patuakhali-4 constituency in the 7th Jatiya Sangsad elections on 12 June 1996 as a candidate of Bangladesh Nationalist Party and as an independent in the 8th Jatiya Sangsad elections of 2001.
