= Salahuddin Miaji =

Retired Bangladesh Army Major General

Muhammad Salahuddin Miaji,
- মোহাম্মদ সালাউদ্দিন মিয়াজী
- Born: 1 January 1962 (age 64); Jhenaidah, East Pakistan, Pakistan
- Military career
- Allegiance: Bangladesh
- Branch: Bangladesh Army
- Service years: 1983–2017
- Rank: Major General
- Unit: East Bengal Regiment
- Commands: Vice-Chancellor of Bangladesh University of Professionals; GOC of 66th Infantry Division; Military Secretary at Army Headquarters; Military Secretary to the Prime Minister; Commander of 222nd Infantry Brigade; Commander of 81st Infantry Brigade
- Conflicts: Gulf War; MINUSCA

Muhammad Salahuddin Miaji is a retired major general of Bangladesh Army and former member of parliament from Jhenaidah-3. He was the general officer commanding of 66th infantry division and area commander of Rangpur Area of the Bangladesh Army in the Rangpur region. He served as the vice-chancellor of the Bangladesh University of Professionals. He is the former military secretary to Prime Minister Sheikh Hasina.

== Early life ==
Salahuddin Miaji was born in Jhenaidah. His father Moinuddin Miyaji was a Member of Parliament for the then Jessore-4 Constituency in the first National Parliament Election in 1973.

== Career ==
He was commissioned in Bangladesh Army in 1983 from 8th BMA long course. As military secretary to Prime Minister Sheikh Hasina, Miaji represented the prime minister at the first anniversary of the Bangladesh Rifles mutiny.

Miaji was appointed the general officer commanding of the 66 Infantry Division of the Bangladesh Army in September 2012 replacing Major General Sabbir Ahmed. He was the military secretary at the Bangladesh Army headquarters. He established the Cantonment Public School And College Lalmonirhat on 24 December 2014. He also established Bangladesh Army University of Science and Technology at Saidpur Nilphamari, Rangpur Army Medical College & Army Nursing College, Rangpur.

From 13 May to 16 May 2015, Miaji led a 13-member delegation of Bangladesh Army on a goodwill trip to Central African Republic, where Bangladeshi soldier were serving in MINUSCA.

From 6 September 2016 to 30 December 2017, Miaji was the vice-chancellor of the Bangladesh University of Professionals. He worked to establish a Bangabandhu Chair, to research the life of Sheikh Mujibur Rahman at the Bangladesh University of Professionals.

=== Civilian ===
He is an executive director of Orion Group.

Miaji was nominated by Awami League to contest the 12th parliamentary elections from Jhenaidah-3. He was elected to parliament on 7 January 2024.
