= Noor Jahan Begum =

Bangladeshi politician

Member of Bangladesh Parliament
- In office 2009–2014
- Preceded by: Bilkis Islam

Personal details
- Party: Bangladesh Awami League

Noor Jahan Begum is a Bangladesh Awami League politician and a former member of the Bangladesh Parliament from a reserved seat.

== Career ==
Begum was elected to parliament from a reserved seat in Jhenidah as a Bangladesh Awami League candidate in 2009.
