= Kazi Nazrul Islam (disambiguation) =

Kazi Nazrul Islam (25 May 1899 – 29 August 1976) was a Bengali poet.

Kazi Nazrul Islam may also refer to:

- Kazi Nazrul Islam (footballer) (born 1978), Bangladeshi footballer
- Kabi Nazrul Institute, Bangladesh's national institute dedicated to Kazi Nazrul Islam
- Kazi Nazrul Islam Airport, in West Bengal, India
- Kavi Nazrul metro station, in Kolkata, West Bengal, India
- Kazi Nazrul University, Asansol, West Bengal, India

== See also ==
- Nazrul Islam (disambiguation), a list of people with the name
- List of works by Kazi Nazrul Islam
- Jatiya Kabi Kazi Nazrul Islam University, in Bangladesh
- Kazi Nazrul Islam Avenue, in Dhaka, Bangladesh
- VIP Road, Kolkata, or Kazi Nazrul Islam Sarani, in West Bengal, India
- Kazi Nazrul Islam Mahavidyalaya, an affiliated college of Tripura University, in West Bengal, India
- Nazrul Mancha, auditorium in Kolkata, India
- Nazrul Tirtha, cultural centre in Kolkata, India
