= ASM Mozammel Haque =

Bangladeshi politician

Member of Parliament for Jessore-4
- In office 1979–1982
- Preceded by: Mohammad Moinuddin Miazi
- Succeeded by: Shah Hadiizzzaman

Member of Parliament for Jhenaidah-3
- In office 1986–1987
- Succeeded by: Shamsul Huda Khan

Personal details
- Party: Bangladesh Jamaat-e-Islami
- Other political affiliations: Islamic Democratic League

ASM Mozammel Haque was a Bangladesh Jamaat-e-Islami politician and a member of parliament for Jessore-4 and Jhenaidah-3.

== Career ==
Haque was elected a member of parliament from undivided Jessore-4 as an Islamic Democratic League candidate in 1979 Bangladeshi general election. He was elected to parliament from Jhenaidah-3 as a Bangladesh Jamaat-e-Islami candidate in 1986. In 1987, he and 10 other MPs resigned from parliament following the party decision of Bangladesh Jamaat-e-Islami.

He was defeated in the fifth parliamentary elections of 1991 and the seventh parliamentary elections on 12 June 1996 as a candidate of Bangladesh Jamaat-e-Islami from the Jhenaidah-3 constituency.

He was reported as deceased by Jamaat-e-Islami in 1986 but no data exists regarding when he died.
