= Md. Motiar Rahman =

Bangladeshi politician and businessman

Member of Parliament
- Incumbent
- Assumed office 17 February 2026
- Preceded by: Salahuddin Miaji
- Constituency: Jhenaidah-3

Personal details
- Born: August 7, 1957 Kotchandpur, Jhenaidah, East Pakistan
- Party: Bangladesh Jamaat-e-Islami
- Spouse: Nazma Rahman
- Occupation: Businessman and politician

Md. Motiar Rahman is a Bangladeshi politician and businessman. He is an elected Member of Parliament from the Jhenaidah-3 constituency.
