= Mohammad Moinuddin Miazi =

Bangladeshi politician

Member of Bangladesh Parliament
- In office 1973–1979
- Succeeded by: Shamsul Haque

Personal details
- Party: Bangladesh Awami League

Mohammad Moinuddin Miazi is a Bangladesh Awami League politician and a former member of parliament for Jessore-4.

== Early life ==
Moinuddin Miazi was born in Jhenaidah. His elder son is retired Major General Salahuddin Miaji.

== Career ==
Miazi was elected to parliament from Jessore-4 as a Bangladesh Awami League candidate in 1973.
