= Shahanara Begum (politician) =

Bangladeshi politician

Member of Bangladesh Parliament
- In office 2005–2006

Personal details
- Born: Pabna
- Party: Bangladesh Jamaat-e-Islami

Shahanara Begum (Bengali: শাহানারা বেগম, Bengali pronunciation: [ʃaɦanaɾa beɡom]) is a politician of the Bangladesh Jamaat-e-Islami and a former member of the Bangladesh Parliament from a reserved seat.

== Career ==
Shahanara Begum was a member of parliament nominated by the Bangladesh Jamaat-e-Islami candidate from the reserved women's seat 32 of the 8th Jatiya Sangsad.
