= Kafiluddin Chowdhury =

Bangladeshi politician. Joint Secretary of United Front

- কফিলউদ্দীন চৌধুরী

Member of National Assembly
- Preceded by: Altaf Uddin Choudhury

Personal details
- Born: 1898 Munshiganj, Bengal Presidency, British India
- Died: 12 May 1972 (aged 73–74)
- Party: Krishok Shramik Party
- Children: Badruddoza Chowdhury; Shamsuddoha Chowdhury; Choudhury A.K Sadrul Ula, Nurul Huda Choudhury, Ayesha Ahsan, Rahima Asad, Rashida Doha, Choudhury Fatema Muyeed, Rokeya Choudhury
- Relatives: Mahi B. Chowdhury (grandson) Kafil W. Choudhury (grandson)

Kafiluddin Chowdhury (1898 – 12 May 1972) was a politician and a member of Provincial and National Assembly of Pakistan.

== Early life ==
Chowdhury was born in 1898 in Dayhata Majidpur, Srinagar, Munshiganj (present-day Bangladesh). He graduated from Hasara Kalikishore High School and finished his law degree in Kolkata.

== Career ==
Chowdhury started his legal career in Munshiganj sub-divisional court. He moved his practice to Dhaka. He started his political career in the Krishak Praja Party of AK Fazlul Huq. He campaigned for the Movement for Pakistan In 1954 he was elected to the provincial assembly. He served as the Minister of Law, Forest, Roads and Communication, and Land ministries in the provincial government of East Pakistan.

Chowdhury was imprisoned after president Ayub Khan declared Martial Law. He was elected to the National assembly in 1970. He crossed over to India during Bangladesh Liberation War.

== Death and legacy ==
In November 1971, Chowdhury had a heart attack. He moved to independent Bangladesh after the war on 31 January 1972 and died on 12 May. His son, Badruddoza Chowdhury, became the 13th President of Bangladesh during 2001–2002. His other son was Shamsuddoha Chowdhury (1928–2018).
