= Sultana Razia (politician) =

Bangladeshi politician

Member of Bangladesh Parliament
- In office 2001–2006

Personal details
- Party: Bangladesh Jamaat-e-Islami

Sultana Razia (Bengali: সুলতানা রাজ়িয়া) is a politician of the Bangladesh Jamaat-e-Islami and a former member of the Bangladesh Parliament from a reserved seat.

== Career ==
Sultana Razia was a member of parliament nominated by the Bangladesh Jamaat-e-Islami for reserved women's seat 33 of the 8th Jatiya Sangsad.
