= Nazrul Islam (Jessore politician) =

Bangladeshi politician

Member of Bangladesh Parliament
- In office February 1996 – June 1996
- Preceded by: Shah Hadiizzzaman
- Succeeded by: Shah Hadiizzzaman

Personal details
- Party: Bangladesh Nationalist Party

Nazrul Islam is a Bangladesh Nationalist Party politician and a former member of parliament for Jessore-4.

== Career ==
Islam was elected to parliament from Jessore-4 as a Bangladesh Nationalist Party candidate in February 1996.
