= Sukumar Ranjan Ghosh =

Bangladeshi politician (1952–2025)

- সুকুমার রঞ্জন ঘোষ

Member of Parliament for Munshiganj-1
- In office 25 January 2009 – 29 January 2019
- Preceded by: Mahi B. Chowdhury
- Succeeded by: Mahi B. Chowdhury

Personal details
- Born: 4 January 1952
- Died: 22 December 2025 (aged 73) Dhaka, Bangladesh
- Party: Bangladesh Awami League

Sukumar Ranjan Ghosh (4 January 1952 – 22 December 2025) was a Bangladesh Awami League politician and a Jatiya Sangsad member, representing the Munshiganj-1 constituency.

== Early life ==
Ghosh was born on 4 January 1952. He graduated from college.

== Career ==
Ghosh was elected to parliament from Munshiganj-1 in 2008 and 2014 as a Bangladesh Awami League candidate. In August 2013, Mobarak Hossain Jihadi threatened Ghosh and demanded 500,000 taka from him. Police arrested Jihadi in September 2014 from South Keraniganj, Dhaka. On 27 March 2017, 15 people were injured in a fight between supporters of Ghosh and supporters of Bangladesh Awami League leader Golam Sarwar Kabi.

== Death ==
Ghosh died from pneumonia in Dhaka on 22 December 2025 at the age of 73.
