= Enamul Haque Babul =

Bangladesh politician

- এনামুল হক বাবুল

Member of the Bangladesh Parliament for Jessore-4
- In office 30 January 2024 – 6 August 2024
- Preceded by: Ranajit Kumar Roy

Personal details
- Born: 1 February 1954 (age 72)

Enamul Haque (born 1 February 1954) is a Bangladesh Awami League politician and a former Jatiya Sangsad member representing the Jessore-4 constituency in 2024.
