= Patuakhali-4 =

Constituency of Bangladesh's Jatiya Sangsad

Coordinates: 21.99°N 90.22°E

- Constituency for the Jatiya Sangsad
- District: Patuakhali District
- Division: Barisal Division
- Electorate: 249,035 (2018)

Current constituency
- Created: 1973
- ← 113 Patuakhali-3 115 Bhola-1 →

Patuakhali-4 is a constituency represented in the Jatiya Sangsad (National Parliament) of Bangladesh. The current Member of Parliament in this constituency is ABM Mosharraf Hossain of Bangladesh Nationalist Party.

== Boundaries ==
The constituency encompasses Kalapara and Rangabali upazilas.

== History ==
The constituency was created for the first general elections in newly independent Bangladesh, held in 1973.

== Members of Parliament ==
Election	Member	Party
1973	Kazi Abul Kashem	Awami League
1979	Abdul Baten	BNP
Major Boundary Changes
1986	Abdur Razzak Khan	Jatiya Party
1991	Anwarul Islam	Awami League
Feb 1996	Mustafizur Rahman	BNP
Jun 1996	Anwarul Islam	Awami League
2001	Mahbubur Rahman Talukdar	Awami League
2018	Muhibur Rahman Muhib	Awami League
Feb 2026	ABM Mosharraf Hossain	BNP

== Elections ==
=== Elections in the 2010s ===
Mahbubur Rahman was re-elected unopposed in the 2014 general election after opposition parties withdrew their candidacies in a boycott of the election.

=== Elections in the 2000s ===
General Election 2008: Patuakhali-4
Party	Candidate	Votes	%	±%
AL	Mahbubur Rahman	90,775	54.8	+16.0
BNP	A. B. M. Mosharraf Hossen	60,095	36.2	+11.2
IAB	Md. Hedayet Ullah	893	0.5	N/A
Majority		30,680	18.5	+8.2
Turnout		165,797	88.8	+19.2
AL hold				

General Election 2001: Patuakhali-4
Party	Candidate	Votes	%	±%
AL	Mahbubur Rahman	51,940	38.8	+4.1
Independent	Mostafizur Rahman	38,098	28.5	N/A
BNP	Md. Atikur Rahman	33,415	25.0	−1.1
IJOF	Abdur Razzak Khan	10,279	7.7	N/A
Independent	Anwarul Islam	73	0.1	N/A
Jatiya Party (M)	Md. Nazrul Islam	50	0.0	N/A
Majority		13,842	10.3	+1.6
Turnout		133,855	69.6	−0.6
AL hold				

=== Elections in the 1990s ===
General Election June 1996: Patuakhali-4
Party	Candidate	Votes	%	±%
AL	Anwarul Islam	31,092	34.7	−7.6
BNP	Mostafizur Rahman	23,348	26.1	−2.1
Independent	Abdul Khaleq	13,487	15.1	N/A
JP(E)	Abdul Razzak Khan	10,844	12.1	+1.3
IOJ	Md. Baharul Alam	8,494	9.5	−6.2
Jamaat	Md. A. Khaleq Faruki	1,876	2.1	+1.9
Zaker Party	Syed Abdul Goni	343	0.4	−0.5
Majority		7,744	8.7	−5.3
Turnout		89,484	70.2	+20.6
AL hold				

General Election 1991: Patuakhali-4
Party	Candidate	Votes	%	±%
AL	Anwarul Islam	32,707	42.3	
BNP	Jahangir Hossain Akond	21,837	28.2	
IOJ	Ershad Ullah	12,118	15.7	
JP(E)	Abdul Razzak Khan	8,331	10.8	
Zaker Party	A. Rob Miah	666	0.9	
FP	Moazzem Hossain	419	0.5	
Jatiya Samajtantrik Dal-JSD	Mufti Salahuddin	374	0.5	
Independent	Syed Md. Abul Hashem	371	0.5	
BKA	A. K. M. Nurul Islam	241	0.3	
JSD (S)	Sihab Parvez Biswas	120	0.2	
Jamaat	A. Matin	119	0.2	
CPB	Md. Shamim Miah	95	0.1	
Majority		10,870	14.0	
Turnout		77,398	49.6	
AL gain from JP(E)				
