= Shahana Rahman Rani =

Bangladeshi politician (died 2022)

Member of Bangladesh Parliament
- In office 2005–2006

Personal details
- Died: 5 July 2022 Dhaka, Bangladesh
- Party: Bangladesh Nationalist Party

Shahana Rahman Rani was a Bangladesh Nationalist Party politician and a member of the Bangladesh Parliament from reserved seat-24.

== Career ==
Rani was elected to parliament from reserved seat as a Bangladesh Nationalist Party candidate in 2005. She also served as the vice-president of Bangladesh Jatiotabadi Mohila Dal. She died on 5 July 2022 in Evercare Hospital Dhaka.
