= Yasmin Ara Haque =

Bangladeshi politician

Member of Bangladesh Parliament
- In office 2005–2006

Personal details
- Political party: Bangladesh Nationalist Party

Yasmin Ara Haque is a Bangladesh Nationalist Party politician and a former member of parliament from a reserved seat.

== Career ==
Haque was elected to parliament from a reserved seat as a Bangladesh Nationalist Party candidate in 2005.

Haque is a member of the national executive committee of the Bangladesh Nationalist Party.
