= Mahbubur Rahman (politician, born 1954) =

Bangladeshi politician (1954–2024)

Md. Mahbubur Rahman
- মোহাম্মদ মাহবুবুর রহমান

State Minister of Water Resources
- In office 31 July 2009 – 24 January 2014
- Preceded by: Gautam Chakroborty
- Succeeded by: Muhammad Nazrul Islam

Member of Parliament for Patuakhali-4
- In office 28 October 2001 – 29 October 2018
- Preceded by: Anwarul Islam
- Succeeded by: Muhibur Rahman Muhib

Personal details
- Born: 1 January 1954
- Died: 22 September 2024 (aged 70)
- Party: Bangladesh Awami League
- Spouse: Preeti Rahman

Md. Mahbubur Rahman Talukdar (1 January 1954 – 22 September 2024), known as Mahbubur Rahman, was a Bangladesh Awami League politician and a Jatiya Sangsad member representing the Patuakhali-4 constituency from 2001 to 2018. He also served as the state minister of water resources during 2009–2014.

== Background and career ==
Rahman was born on 1 January 1954. He had an M.A. and a law degree.

Rahman was elected to parliament in 2001, 2008, and 2014 from Patuakhali-4 as a Bangladesh Awami League candidate.

On 23 February 2014, the Anti-Corruption Commission (ACC) interrogated Rahman on charges of accumulation of wealth illegally. On 21 August, the ACC charged him formally. According to Rahman's submitted wealth statement, his land assets rose from 20 acres (8 ha) in 2008 to 2,865 acres (1160 ha) in 2014.

== Personal life and death ==
Rahman was married to Preeti Haider.

Rahman died on 22 September 2024, at the age of 70.
