= Shamsuddin Ahmed Ishaq =

Bangladeshi politician

- সামসুদ্দীন আহমেদ এছাক

Member of Parliament for Narsingdi-1
- In office 5 March 1991 – 27 March 2005
- Preceded by: Mustafa Jamal
- Succeeded by: Khairul Kabir Khokon

Personal details
- Born: 1 September 1941 Narsingdi
- Died: 27 March 2005 (aged 63) Dhaka, Bangladesh
- Party: Bangladesh Nationalist Party
- Spouse: Rokeya Ahmed Lucky

Shamsuddin Ahmed Ishaq (1 September 1941 – 27 March 2005) was a Bangladesh Nationalist Party politician and a Jatiya Sangsad member representing the Narsingdi-1 constituency for four terms since 1991 until his death in office in 2005.

== Early life ==
Shamsuddin Ahmed Ishaq was born on 1 September 1941 in Narsingdi District.

== Career ==
Ishaq was a former president of Narsingdi district BNP. He was a listed artist of Bangladesh Television and Bangladesh Betar. Hundreds of his songs have been broadcast on radio and television. More than 15 plays have been on stage.

He lost his father when he was 14 years old. Despite his father's considerable wealth, Mollah Mosleh Uddin, Ishaq started working as a general laborer at Jaba Textile Mill in Narsingdi early in life. He did not believe in enjoying life in his father's possession. Sooner he became a labor leader due to his good relations with the workers and his steadfastness in principle.

He led the movement as a labor leader in 1968. [5] [6] He took part in the anti-Ayub movement in Narsingdi in 1969 and took part in the liberation war in 1971. He was elected vice-chairman of Narsingdi municipality in 1973 and chairman twice in 1984 and 1989. He first joined the United People's Party (UPP) in 1979 and became involved in politics. The following year he joined the Bangladesh Nationalist Party (BNP). [6]

Ishaq was elected to Parliament four times in a row in 1991, February 1996, June 1996, and 2001 national elections.

He edited and published Arshite Mukh, a journal based in Narsingdi.

== Personal life and death ==
Ishaq had married three times. He had six sons and four daughters. One of his wife, Rokeya Ahmed Lucky, became a Jatiya Sangsad member from the women's reserved seat.

He died on 27 March 2005 in Comfort Hospital, Dhaka, Bangladesh.
