= Shamsul Islam Khan =

Bangladeshi politician

- শামসুল ইসলাম খান

Minister of Industries
- In office 20 March 1991 – January 1993
- Prime Minister: Khaleda Zia
- Preceded by: Sultan Mahmud
- Succeeded by: A. M. Zahiruddin Khan

Member of Parliament for Manikganj-4
- In office 27 October 2001 – 22 January 2006
- Succeeded by: Moinul Islam Khan

Personal details
- Died: 22 January 2006 (aged 76) Dhaka, Bangladesh
- Party: Bangladesh Nationalist Party
- Children: Moinul Islam Khan

Shamsul Islam Khan (known as Naya Miah; died on 22 January 2006) was a Bangladesh Nationalist Party politician and a former Jatiya Sangsad member representing the Manikganj-4 constituency and a former minister of industries at the first Khaleda Zia cabinet.

== Career ==
Khan served as the president of Abahani Limited Dhaka from 1978 to 1982. He was elected to Parliament in 1991 from Manikganj-4 as a candidate of Bangladesh Nationalist Party. From 1991 to 1996 he served as the Minister of Industries in the First Khaleda Zia Cabinet. He was elected in 2001 to parliament from Manikganj-4. He was elected four times from Manikganj-4 constituency.

== Personal life ==
Khan died on 22 January 2006 in LabAid Cardiac Hospital, Dhaka.

Khan's son, Moinul Islam Khan, was made a member of former Prime Minister Khaleda Zia's advisory council on 7 August 2016. He had two daughters and one son.
