= Chaman Ara Begum =

Bangladeshi politician (c.1950–2018)

Member of Parliament for Reserved Women's Seat-11
- In office 28 October 2001 – 27 October 2006

Personal details
- Born: c. 1950
- Died: 28 March 2018 (aged 68)
- Party: Bangladesh Nationalist Party

Chaman Ara Begum (c. 1950 – 28 March 2018) was a Bangladeshi politician from Jessore belonging to the Bangladesh Nationalist Party. She was a member of the Jatiya Sangsad.

== Biography ==
Begum was the president of the Jessore unit of Mahila Dal. She was elected as a member of the Jatiya Sangsad from Reserved Women's Seat-11 in 2001.

Begum died on 28 March 2018 at Green Life Hospital in Dhaka at the age of 75.
