= Rokeya Ahmed Lucky =

Bangladeshi politician

Member of Bangladesh Parliament
- In office 2005–2006

Personal details
- Political party: Bangladesh Nationalist Party
- Spouse: Shamsuddin Ahmed Ishaq

Rokeya Ahmed Lucky is a Bangladesh Nationalist Party politician and a former member of the Bangladesh Parliament from a reserved seat.

== Career ==
Lucky was elected to parliament from a reserved seat as a Bangladesh Nationalist Party candidate in 2005. Her husband, Shamsuddin Ahmed Ishaq, was also a member of parliament.
