= Muhibur Rahman Muhib =

Bangladeshi politician

- মুহিব্বুর রহমান মুহিব
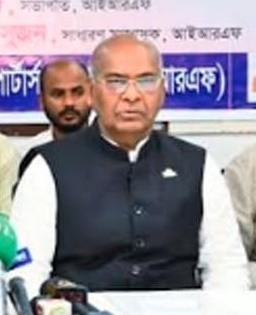

Minister of State for Disaster Management and Relief
- In office 11 January 2024 – 6 August 2024
- Prime Minister: Sheikh Hasina
- Preceded by: Md. Enamur Rahaman

Member of the Bangladesh Parliament for Patuakhali-4
- In office 30 January 2019 – 6 August 2024
- Preceded by: Mahbubur Rahman

Personal details
- Born: 18 January 1957 (age 69)
- Party: Bangladesh Awami League
- Occupation: Teacher, politician

Muhibur Rahman Muhib (born 18 January 1957) is a politician from Patuakhali District of Bangladesh. He is a former Jatiya Sangsad member representing the Patuakhali-4 constituency during 2018–2024.

== Career ==
Muhibur Rahman Muhib was the principal of Alhaj Jalal Uddin Degree College, Dhulasar, Kalapara, Patuakhali. He is serving as the Social Welfare Secretary of Kalapara Upazila Awami League and a member of the Central Committee of Bangladesh Awami Jubo League. He is the vice president of the Awami League chapter in the Patuakhali district.

He was elected as a member of parliament from the Patuakhali-4 constituency as a candidate of the Bangladesh Awami League in the Eleventh Parliamentary Election in 2018.

Muhib's house was vandalized on 21 November 2026 by people from a rally of the ruling Bangladesh Nationalist Party.
