= Shah Hadiuzzaman =

Bangladeshi politician

Shah Hadiizzzaman

Member of Bangladesh Parliament
- In office 1986–1988
- Preceded by: Mozammel Haque
- Succeeded by: M. Nazim Uddin Al Azad

Personal details
- Died: 20 February 2017 Dhaka, Bangladesh
- Party: Bangladesh Awami League

Shah Hadiuzzaman was a Bangladesh Awami League politician and a member of parliament for Jessore-4.

== Family Background ==
Shah Hadiuzzaman was born on March 10, 1939, into a Persian-origin Peer family in Nawapara, Abhaynagar, Jessore district . His father, Khwaja Abdul Majid Shah was regarded a saint and a literate persona who initiated and led extensive reforms to practices and education in the area. His grandparents had fled from Sistan Province of Iran during the rule of the Qajar Dynasty due to sectarian Sunni-Shi'ite friction, his grandfather Mawlana Khwaja Mohammad Ali Shah, also known locally as Shah Irani, was a preacher and Sufi-saint figure of the Qadiriyya Tariqa who had established a Khanqah in Nawapara upon his arrival in Nawapara Bazar in 1900, he also established the Jamia Arabiyya Mohiul Islam Madrasa in 1918, passing away in 1937. Shah Hadiuzzaman passed his matriculation in 1957.

== Career ==
Shah Hadiuzzaman got involved in the politics of the Chhatra League while he was a student in 1958. He served various responsibilities including being the national councilor of the East Pakistan Awami League in 1966, the general secretary of the Jessore District Awami League Convening Committee in 1972, the general secretary of the district committee in 1973, and the senior vice-president of the Jessore District Committee from 1977 to 1995.

He was the first provincial council member elected as a candidate nominated by the Awami League from the Abhaynagar-Bagharpara constituency in 1970. He served as the Youth Camp of Ghoshpur during the Liberation War in 1971. He was a member of the Constituent Assembly of the Bangladesh In-Residence Government of Mujibnagar in 1971.

He was elected as a Member of Parliament from the abolished Jessore-8 constituency in the first national election of 1973 on the nomination of the Awami League . He was then elected as a Member of Parliament from Jessore-4 ( Bagharpara - Abhaynagar ) constituency on the nomination of the Bangladesh Awami League in the third national election of 1986 , the fifth national election of 1991 and the seventh national election of June 1996. He was the Chairman of the Parliamentary Standing Committee on the Ministry of Religious Affairs of the Bangladesh National Parliament during the period 1996–2001 .

He was elected as the Administrator of Jessore Zilla Parishad from 2008 to 2016 and as the Chairman of Jessore Zilla Parishad in 2016. He was nominated as a central member of the Awami League on 24 November 2016.

He was defeated in the eighth national election in 2001.

Hadiizzzaman was elected to parliament from Jessore-4 as a Bangladesh Awami League candidate in 1986.

== Death ==
Hadiizzzzman died on 20 February 2017 in Square Hospital, Dhaka, Bangladesh.
