= Noor Afroze Begum Jyoti =

Bangladeshi politician

Member of Bangladesh Parliament
- In office 2005–2006

Personal details
- Party: Bangladesh Nationalist Party

Noor Afroze Begum Jyoti is a Bangladesh Nationalist Party politician and a former member of parliament from a reserved seat.

== Career ==
Jyoti was elected to parliament from a reserved seat as a Bangladesh Nationalist Party candidate in 2005. She is the president of the Bogura District unit of Jatiyatabadi Mohila Dal.

Jyoti and Ruhul Quddus Talukder Dulu provided support to Rafique Khan, an alleged war criminal and member of East Pakistan Central Peace Committee, who had grabbed government land after the Bangladesh Liberation War and constructed 150 houses. He had collected earned 100 million BDT from the land worth 600 million BDT and was sued by the administration of Bogra District which had claimed the land.

In May 2022, Jyoti was sentenced to seven years imprisonment in a corruption case.
