= Shafiqul Azam Khan =

Bangladeshi politician

Member of Parliament

Personal details
- Born: 20 December 1966 (age 59) Moheshpur Upazila. Jhenaidah District
- Party: Bangladesh Awami League

Shafiqul Azam Khan (born 20 December 1966) is a Bangladesh Awami League politician and former member of parliament from Jhenaidah-3. He studied at Rajshahi University.

== Early life ==
Khan was born on 20 December 1966. He completed his undergraduate and master's in law at the University of Rajshahi.

== Career ==
Khan was elected to parliament in 2008 from Jhenaidah-3 as a Bangladesh Awami League candidate. He faced a legal challenge from the Bangladesh Election Commission because he contested the election while he was the mayor of Moheshpur municipality. The commission asked why his candidacy should not be cancelled for violating the electoral code.
