= Moinul Islam Khan =

Bangladeshi politician

Moinul Islam Khan Shanto

Member of Parliament for Manikganj-2
- In office 1 May 2006 – 27 October 2006
- Preceded by: Shamsul Islam Khan
- Succeeded by: Constituency dissolved

Personal details
- Party: Bangladesh Nationalist Party
- Parent: Shamsul Islam Khan (father)

Moinul Islam Khan Shanto is a Bangladesh Nationalist Party politician and a former Jatiya Sangsad member representing the Manikganj-4 constituency.Current Jatiya Sangsad member representing Manikgonj-2. He won the National election of 2026.

== Career ==
Khan was elected to parliament from Manikganj-4 (now defunct) as a Bangladesh Nationalist Party candidate in May 2006.
