= Munshiganj-4 =

Constituency of Bangladesh's Jatiya Sangsad

- Former constituency for the Jatiya Sangsad
- District: Munshiganj District
- Division: Dhaka Division

Former constituency
- Created: 1984
- Abolished: 2006

Munshiganj-4 is a defunct constituency represented in the Jatiya Sangsad (National Parliament) of Bangladesh abolished in 2006.

== Members of Parliament ==
Election	Member	Party
1986	Mohiuddin Ahmed	Awami League
1988	Nur Mohammad	Jatiya Party
1991	Md. Abdul Hai	BNP
Abolished constituency
