= Narsingdi-1 =

Constituency of Bangladesh's Jatiya Sangsad

Coordinates: 23.93°N 90.72°E

- Constituency for the Jatiya Sangsad
- District: Narsingdi District
- Division: Dhaka Division
- Electorate: 380,095 (2018)

Current constituency
- Created: 1984
- Party: Bangladesh Nationalist Party
- Member: Khairul Kabir Khokon
- ← 198 Gazipur-5 200 Narsingdi-2 →

Narsingdi-1 is a constituency represented in the Jatiya Sangsad (National Parliament) of Bangladesh since 2026 by Khairul Kabir Khokon of the Bangladesh Nationalist Party.

== Boundaries ==
The constituency encompasses all but three union parishads of Narsingdi Sadar Upazila: Amdia, Meher Para, and Panchdona.

== History ==
The constituency was created in 1984 from a Dhaka constituency when the former Dhaka District was split into six districts: Manikganj, Munshiganj, Dhaka, Gazipur, Narsingdi, and Narayanganj.

Ahead of the 2008 general election, the Election Commission redrew constituency boundaries to reflect population changes revealed by the 2001 Bangladesh census. The 2008 redistricting altered the boundaries of the constituency.

Ahead of the 2014 general election, the Election Commission expanded the boundaries of the constituency. Previously it excluded a fourth union parishad of Narsingdi Sadar Upazila: Silmandi.

== Members of Parliament ==
Election	Member	Party
1986	Samsul Huda Bachchu	Jatiya Party
1988	Mustafa Jamal	Jatiya Party
1991	Shamsuddin Ahmed Ishaq	Bangladesh Nationalist Party
Feb 1996	Shamsuddin Ahmed Ishaq	Bangladesh Nationalist Party
Jun 1996	Shamsuddin Ahmed Ishaq	Bangladesh Nationalist Party
2001	Shamsuddin Ahmed Ishaq	Bangladesh Nationalist Party
2005 by-election	Khairul Kabir Khokon	Bangladesh Nationalist Party
2008	Muhammad Nazrul Islam	Awami League
2014	Muhammad Nazrul Islam	Awami League
2018	Muhammad Nazrul Islam	Awami League
2024	Muhammad Nazrul Islam	Awami League
2026	Khairul Kabir Khokon	Bangladesh Nationalist Party

== Elections ==
=== Elections in the 2020s ===
General election 2026: Narsingdi-1
Party	Candidate	Votes	%	±%
BNP	Khairul Kabir Khokon	160,676		
Jamaat	Md. Ibrahim Bhuiyan	92,930		
IAB	Md. Ashraf Hossain Bhuiyan			
Majority		67,746		
Turnout				
Registered electors		477,209		
BNP gain from AL				

=== Elections in the 2010s ===
General Election 2014: Narsingdi-1
Party	Candidate	Votes	%	±%
AL	Muhammad Nazrul Islam	80,896	94.8	+42.9
JP(E)	Mohammad Mostofa Jamal	4,475	5.2	N/A
Majority		76,421	89.5	+82.4
Turnout		85,371	25.9	−61.4
AL hold				

=== Elections in the 2000s ===
General Election 2008: Narsingdi-1
Party	Candidate	Votes	%	±%
AL	Muhammad Nazrul Islam	122,105	51.9	
BNP	Khairul Kabir Khokon	105,454	44.9	
IAB	Ashrafur Rahman	6,511	2.7	
Gano Front	Md. Zakir Hossain	537	0.2	
Gano Forum	Shahiduzzaman Chowdhury	482	0.2	
Majority		16,651	7.1	
Turnout		235,089	87.3	
AL gain from BNP				

Shamsuddin Ahmed Ishaq died in March 2005. Khairul Islam Khokon of the BNP was elected in a June by-election.

General Election 2001: Narsingdi-1
Party	Candidate	Votes	%	±%
BNP	Shamsuddin Ahmed Ishaq	101,313	52.8	+13.0
AL	Mohammad Ali	84,889	44.2	+4.4
IJOF	Samsul Huda Bachchu	5,271	2.8	N/A
Zaker Party	M. S. Bari Khan	422	0.2	−1.3
Ganatantri Party	A. K. M. Shahidul Islam	124	0.1	N/A
Majority		16,424	8.6	−0.3
Turnout		192,019	74.0	−0.3
BNP hold				

=== Elections in the 1990s ===
General Election June 1996: Narsingdi-1
Party	Candidate	Votes	%	±%
BNP	Shamsuddin Ahmed Ishaq	58,342	39.8	−18.6
AL	Asaduzzaman	45,353	30.9	−0.8
JP(E)	Md. Mejbauddin	27,461	18.7	+12.2
Jamaat	Sayed Kamal Uddin Jafan	7,968	5.4	N/A
IOJ	Md. Mehar Uddin	4,616	3.2	N/A
Zaker Party	Md. Sadequl Bari Khan	2,134	1.5	−0.3
Independent	Md. Sirajul Haque	225	0.2	N/A
BKA	Shanf Ahmed Faraji	189	0.1	N/A
FP	Mostofa Kamal Ahmed	125	0.1	N/A
Gano Forum	Abdul Hasim Mian	122	0.1	N/A
Samridhya Bangladesh Andolan	Md. Zakir Hossain	54	0.0	N/A
Majority		12,989	8.9	−19.4
Turnout		146,589	74.3	+16.5
BNP hold				

General Election 1991: Narsingdi-1
Party	Candidate	Votes	%	±%
BNP	Shamsuddin Ahmed Ishaq	80,206	58.4	
AL	Mosleh Uddin	41,340	30.1	
JP(E)	Mostafa Zamal	8,928	6.5	
Zaker Party	Ataur Rahman Khan	2,466	1.8	
Independent	Babul Sarkar	2,374	1.7	
Sramik Krishak Samajbadi Dal	Kazi Hatem Ali	1,379	1.0	
Jatiyatabadi Ganatantrik Dal	Md. Zakir Hossain	346	0.3	
Bangladesh National Congress	Shahjahan Mollik	245	0.2	
Majority		38,866	28.3	
Turnout		137,284	57.8	
BNP gain from				
