= Nazrul Islam (general) =

Major General of Bangladesh Army

Mohammad Nazrul Islam
- Military career
- Allegiance: Bangladesh
- Branch: Bangladesh Army
- Service years: 1987–2023
- Rank: Major General
- Unit: Regiment of Artillery
- Commands: Adjutant general of Army Headquarters; Director General of Directorate General of Defence Purchase; Executive Chairman of Bangladesh Export Processing Zone Authority; GOC of 66th Infantry Division; Commander of Logistics Area; Commander of 33rd Artillery Brigade
- Conflicts: UNAMSIL; MONUSCO
- Awards: Sena Parodorshita Padak (SPP)

Mohammad Nazrul Islam SPP, ndu, afwc, psc, G is a retired major general of the Bangladesh Army who served as adjutant general at army headquarters. Prior to being the AG, he was director general of the Directorate General of Defence Purchase (DGDP). Before joining the DGDP, he was the executive chairman of the Bangladesh Export Processing Zone Authority. He also served as area commander of Logistic Area, Dhaka Cantonment.

== Career ==
Nazrul Islam served in the Directorate General of Forces Intelligence (DGFI), Armed Forces Division, and Military Secretariat (MS) Branch in army headquarters. He commanded three artillery units. He also commanded an artillery brigade at Cumilla Cantonment. He was acting director general of the Bangladesh Institute of International and Strategic Studies when he was a colonel. Moreover, he has served at the UN missions in Sierra Leone and the Democratic Republic of Congo (DRC). On 1 September 2018, he was appointed as president of the Army Golf Club. He was General Officer Commanding (GOC) of 66 Infantry Division at Rangpur Cantonment. During his tenure at BEPZA, a development agreement was signed to establish a 'BEPZA Economic Zone' at Bangabandhu Sheikh Mujib Shilpa Nagar (BSMSN). As an adjutant general, he also served as chairman of the governing body of cadet colleges.
