= Mahi B. Chowdhury =

Bangladeshi politician

- মাহি বি. চৌধুরী
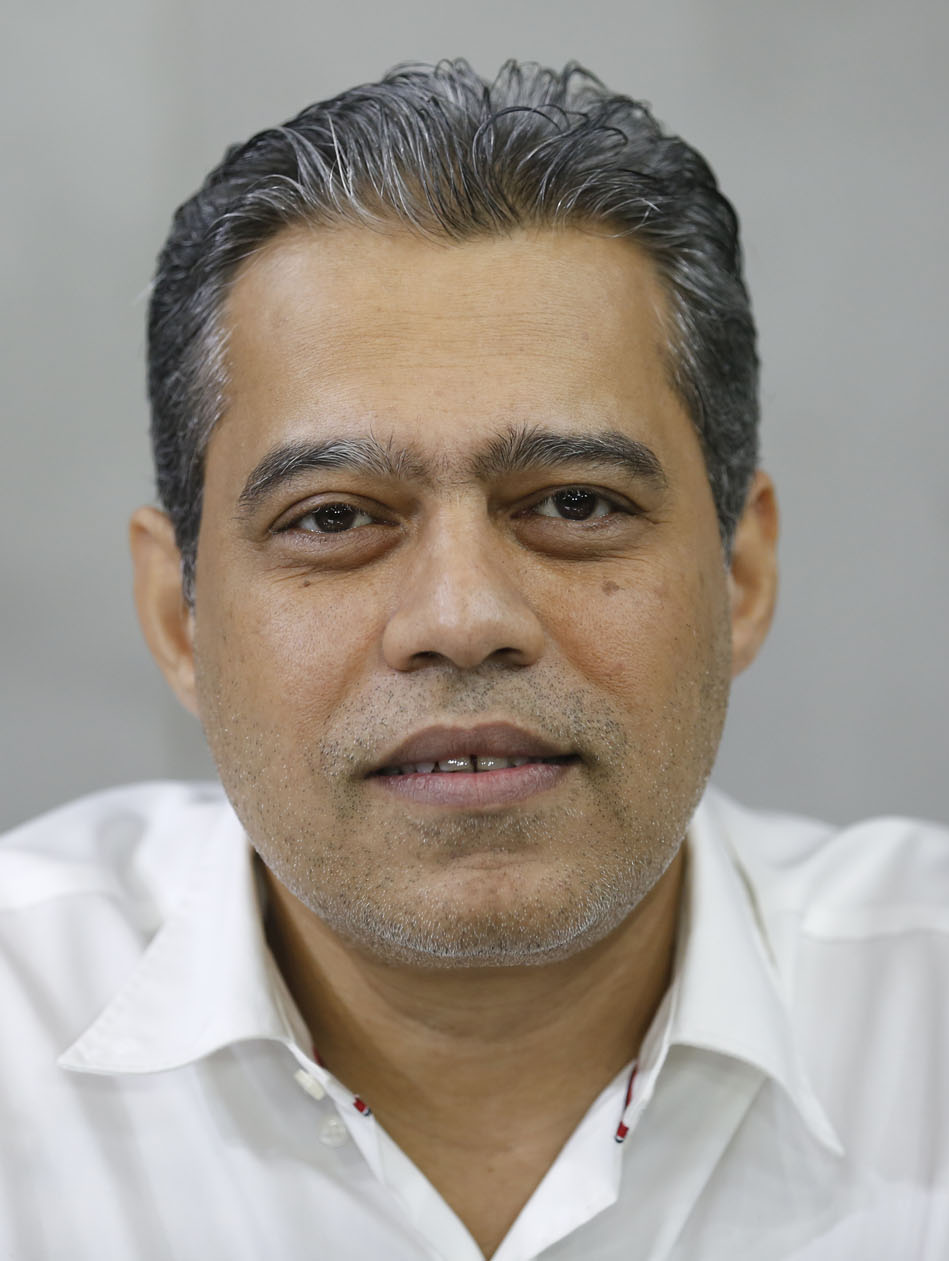
- Chowdhury in 2018

Member of Parliament
- In office 29 January 2019 – 7 January 2024
- Preceded by: Sukumar Ranjan Ghosh
- Constituency: Munshiganj-1
- In office 2002 – 27 October 2006
- Preceded by: A. Q. M. Badruddoza Chowdhury
- Succeeded by: Sukumar Ranjan Ghosh
- Constituency: Munshiganj-1

Personal details
- Born: Mahi Badruddoza Chowdhury; 13 March 1970 (age 56)
- Party: Bikalpa Dhara Bangladesh
- Other political affiliations: Bangladesh Nationalist Party (2001–2004)
- Spouse: Ashfa Haque Lopa
- Parent: A. Q. M. Badruddoza Chowdhury (father)
- Relatives: Kafiluddin Chowdhury (grandfather)
- Education: Political science
- Alma mater: Santa Clara University

Mahi Badruddoza Chowdhury (born 13 March 1970) is a Bangladeshi politician and former Jatiya Sangsad member representing the Munshiganj-1 constituency. He is currently the joint secretary general of the party Bikalpa Dhara Bangladesh (BDB). He is the son of former President A. Q. M. Badruddoza Chowdhury.

== Background ==
Chowdhury is the son of former President of Bangladesh A. Q. M. Badruddoza Chowdhury and former First Lady Hasina Warda Chowdhury. He has two sisters, Muna and Shaila.

Chowdhury completed his bachelor's degree in political science from Santa Clara University in California, United States.

== Career ==
Chowdhury first joined the Bangladesh Nationalist Party (BNP) in August 1992. He was first elected to the parliament in the 2002 by-election from Munshiganj-1 constituency when the seat became vacant after his father, A. Q. M. Badruddoza Chowdhury, became president of Bangladesh.

On 21 June 2002, Chowdhury's father resigned from the presidency after facing the possibility of impeachment and removal from office by the BNP-led parliament. Subsequently, Chowdhury resigned from BNP on 10 March 2004 and joined the Bikalpa Dhara Bangladesh (BDB) – a political party founded by his father. This resignation left a void in the Munshiganj-1 constituency and a by-election was held on 6 June 2004. Chowdhury competed as a member of the BDB party from the same constituency and won the election defeating the BNP candidate Momin Ali.

In November 2003, state-owned Bangladesh Television (BTV) suspended transmission of two programmes, a talk-show Ananda Ghanta and a drama-play Uttaradhikar, from the production company Entertainment Republic, owned by Chowdhury.

In 2007, Chowdhury was briefly involved with the Liberal Democratic Party (LDP).

In June 2012, Chowdhury expressed favorable views of Khaleda Zia, the leader of his previous party, BNP, by saying "Khaleda Zia is the symbol of unity and strength. She always led from the front whenever the country was in a crisis and the people were in distress. Now, she is leading the people's movement pressing for a neutral and non-partisan government."

In April 2015, Chowdhury contested for the mayoral election of Dhaka North City Corporation and finished third with 12,809 votes, compared to Bangladesh Awami League candidate Annisul Huq's 460,117 and BNP candidate Tabith Awal's 325,080 votes.

In August 2019, the Anti-Corruption Commission (ACC) interrogated Chowdhury on allegations of money laundering and accumulation of illegal wealth. Chowdhury denied any wrongdoing.

== Personal life ==
Chowdhury is married to Ashfa Haque Lopa. Together they have a son, Araz B Chowdhury, and daughter Scherezade Chowdhury.
