= Md. Abdul Hai =

Bangladesh Nationalist Party politician (1949–2026)

- আব্দুল হাই
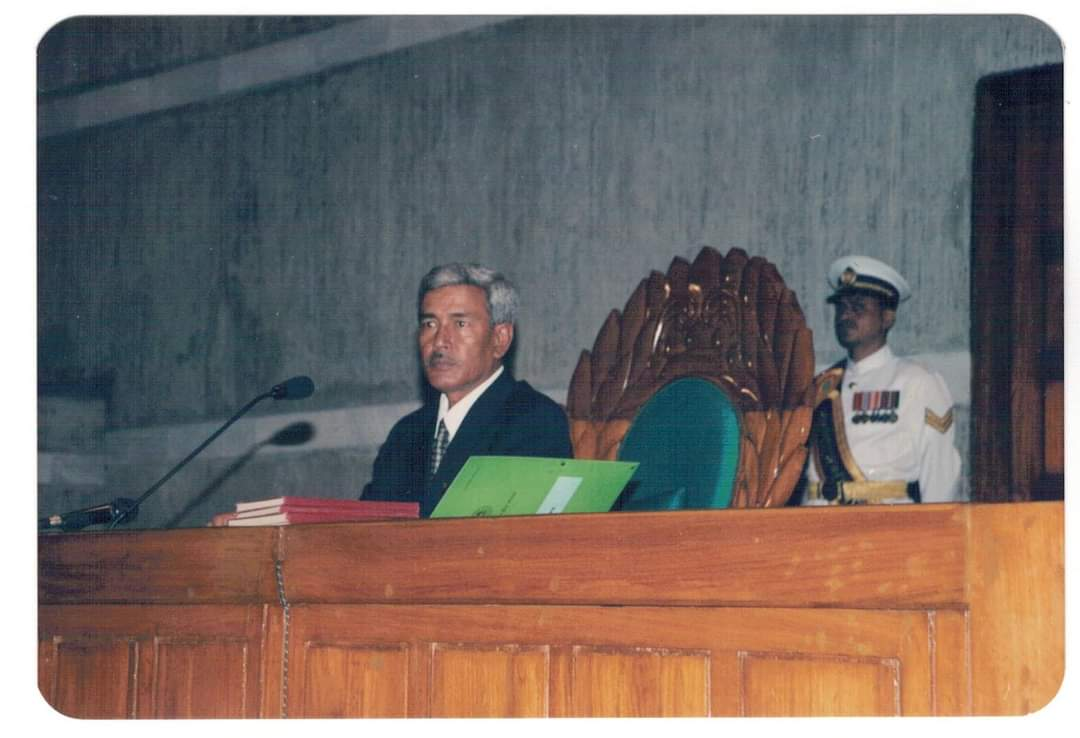

Panel Speaker of the 8th Jatiya Sangsad
- In office 2001–2005

Deputy Minister of Ministry of Local Government, Rural Development and Co-operatives
- In office 1991–1996

Member of Parliament for Dhaka-8
- In office 1979–1982
- Preceded by: K. M. Shamsul Huda
- Succeeded by: Mohammad Harun ar Rashid

Member of Parliament for Munshiganj-4
- In office 1991–2006
- Preceded by: Nur Mohammad
- Succeeded by: Constituency abolished

Personal details
- Born: 5 January 1949 Hosendi, Gazaria Upazila, East Bengal, Pakistan (now Bangladesh)
- Died: 15 October 2026 (aged 77) Dhaka, Bangladesh
- Party: Bangladesh Nationalist Party
- Spouse: Jamila Khatun
- Children: 2 sons and 2 daughters

Md. Abdul Hai (5 January 1949 – 15 October 2026) was a Bangladeshi politician and independence activist. He served as a panel speaker of the Jatiya Sangsad, deputy minister of local government and member of parliament. He was elected a member of parliament from Dhaka-8 and Munshiganj-4 in 1979, 1991, 1996 and 2001.

== Early life ==
Abdul Hai was born on 5 January 1949 in Hosendi, Gazaria Upazila, Munshiganj District. His father, Monir Uddin, was a businessman. He was married to Jamila Khatun, with whom he had two sons and two daughters. His elder brother, Mohiuddin Ahmed, served as the member secretary of the Munshiganj District unit of the Bangladesh Nationalist Party (BNP). Hai completed his secondary education at Munshiganj Multilateral High School before obtaining his Higher Secondary Certificate (HSC) and Bachelor of Arts (BA) degree from Government Haraganga College in Munshiganj.

== Political career ==
Abdul Hai joined the Bangladesh Nationalist Party (BNP) in 1978 and served as its central treasurer. He also served as the secretary for local government affairs on the BNP's central committee. He later served as an adviser to BNP chairperson Khaleda Zia and as president of the party's Munshiganj District unit. In the 1979 Bangladeshi general election, he was elected to the Jatiya Sangsad from the undivided Dhaka-8 constituency as a BNP candidate. He was subsequently elected as a member of parliament from the Munshiganj-4 constituency as a BNP candidate in the 1991 fifth parliamentary election, the sixth parliamentary election held on 15 February 1996, the seventh parliamentary election held on 12 June 1996, and the 2001 eighth parliamentary election.

He was elected as a panel speaker of the Jatiya Sangsad during the eighth parliament. He also served as deputy minister of the Ministry of Local Government, Rural Development and Co-operatives during the fifth parliament. Before becoming a member of parliament in 1979, he had served as chairman of Panchasar Union, one of the larger unions in Munshiganj District, while pursuing his bachelor's degree.

Abdul Hai received the BNP nomination for the Dhaka-4 constituency in the 2008 ninth parliamentary election. He did not contest the 2014 tenth parliamentary election, the 1986 third parliamentary election or the 1988 fourth parliamentary election, as the BNP did not participate in those elections.

=== Speech ===
During the administration of the government led by Sheikh Hasina, Hai attracted attention on social media after addressing party activists at a public gathering and declaring, “ Allah Toma Kache Bichar Dilam (Allah, I seek justice from You.)” A video clip of the speech circulated across various social media platforms and was subsequently widely used in humorous and protest-related content.

== Death ==
Abdul Hai died at his residence in Dhaka, on 15 October 2026, at the age of 77.
