= Samsul Huda Bachchu =

Bangladeshi politician

Member of Bangladesh Parliament
- In office 1986–1988
- Succeeded by: Mustafa Jamal

Personal details
- Died: 10 February 2016 Narsingdi, Bangladesh
- Party: Jatiya Party (Ershad)

Samsul Huda Bachchu was a Jatiya Party (Ershad) politician and member of parliament for Narsingdi-1.

== Career ==
Bachchu fought in Bangladesh Liberation war. He was elected to parliament from Narsingdi-1 as a Jatiya Party candidate in 1986. He was the president of the Narsingdi District unit of the Jatiya Party.

== Death ==
Bachchu died on 10 February 2016 in Narsingdi town, Bangladesh.
