= Reena Parveen =

Bangladeshi politician

Member of Bangladesh Parliament
- In office 2005–2006

Personal details
- Born: Panchagarh
- Party: Bangladesh Nationalist Party

Reena Parveen is a Bangladesh Nationalist Party politician and a former member of the Bangladesh Parliament from a reserved seat.

== Career ==
Parveen is a lawyer. She was elected to parliament from reserved seat as a Bangladesh Nationalist Party candidate in 2005.
