= Muhammad Nazrul Islam =

Bangladeshi politician

Member of the Bangladesh Parliament for Narsingdi-1
- In office 25 January 2009 – 6 August 2024
- Preceded by: Khairul Islam Khokon

State Minister of Water Resources
- In office 25 January 2014 – 6 January 2019
- Preceded by: Mahbubur Rahman
- Succeeded by: Zahid Faruk

Personal details
- Born: 3 August 1951 (age 75) Narsingdi, East Bengal, Pakistan
- Party: Bangladesh Awami League
- Awards: Bir Protik

Military service
- Allegiance: Bangladesh
- Branch/service: Bangladesh Army
- Years of service: 1975 - 1991
- Rank: Lieutenant Colonel
- Unit: Regiment of Artillery
- Commands: Deputy Commander of S Force; CO of 14th Field Artillery Regiment; CO of 21st Medium Artillery Regiment; AQ of 55th Infantry Division
- Battles/wars: Bangladesh Liberation War

Muhammad Nazrul Islam, Bir-Protik, MP

Muhammad Nazrul Islam (born 3 August 1951) is a Bangladesh Awami League politician. He is a former Jatiya Sangsad member representing the Narsingdi-1 constituency during 2009–2024. He served as the state minister of water resources from 2014 to 2018.

== Early life ==
Nazrul Islam was born on 3 August 1951 in Narsingdi, East Bengal, in what was then the Dominion of Pakistan.

== Career ==
When the Bangladesh Liberation War started, Nazrul Islam was a student at Dhaka University. He joined the Mukti Bahini and fought in the war. After the independence of Bangladesh, he was commissioned in the Bangladesh Army. He received the gallantry award, Bir Protik, for his role in the war. He retired from the army in 1991 as a lieutenant colonel. He was elected to parliament in 2008, 2014, and 2018.

== Personal life ==
Islam is married to Farzana Nazrul.
