= Khairul Kabir Khokon =

Bangladeshi politician (born 1972)

Member of Parliament
- In office 2005–2006
- Preceded by: Shamsuddin Ahmed Ishaq
- Succeeded by: Muhammad Nazrul Islam

Member of Parliament
- Incumbent
- Assumed office 17 February 2026
- Preceded by: Muhammad Nazrul Islam

Personal details
- Born: 28 February 1972 (age 54) Narsingdi
- Party: Bangladesh Nationalist Party
- Spouse: Shirin Sultana

Khairul Kabir Khokon is a Bangladesh Nationalist Party politician and a member of parliament for Narsingdi-1, who also currently serves as the party's Joint Secretary. He has been served as the president of Narsingdi District unit of Bangladesh Nationalist Party for a long time.

== Career ==
Khokon was elected to Parliament in 2005 in a by-election from Narsingdi-1 as a candidate of the Bangladesh Nationalist Party. The seat fell vacant following the death of incumbent Member of Parliament Shamsuddin Ahmed Ishaq. He defeated independent candidate Shahadat Hossain Munna. The election was boycotted by the main opposition party, Awami League. The voting saw a low turnout and voting centers were forcefully taken over by Bangladesh Nationalist Party activists who chased away the polling agents of other candidates. His supporters attacked and burned the houses of his political opponents after his victory. He received a plot from the government of Bangladesh.

In March 2007, Giausuddin Al Mamun confessed to police that he and Khokon were involved in extortion of a businessman. Mamun retracted the confession in 2009 which he alleged was taken through torture.

In July 2008, Khokon attended a press conference demanding the release of former Prime Minister and chairperson of Bangladesh Nationalist Party, Khaleda Zia, who had been detained in the Zia Charitable Trust corruption case.

Khokon was sued in the murder case of Narsingdi Mayor Lokman Hossain in November 2011 but was cleared by the courts. The police also charged him with arson and vandalism. He was then president of Narsingdi District unit of Bangladesh Nationalist Party. On 14 November, he was released from jail on bail. In December, the Parliamentary Standing Committee on the Home Ministry, criticised the police for charging Khokon with burning a train in Narsingdi and asked the police to arrest the real culprit. Abdus Salam, chairman of the committee, and Mujib-ul-Haque Chunnu, member of committee described the case as "baseless".

Khokon received bail on 6 January on a vandalism case from 18 December 2018. On 25 April 2012, Khokon's residence was surrounded by police to prevent him from participating in Bangladesh Nationalist Party protests. On 4 June, he was arrested by Detective Branch when he was leaving Dhaka Central Jail after receiving bail.

On 22 March 2016, Khokon was sued in an arson case along with 32 other Bangladesh Nationalist Party leaders.

In May 2017, Khokon was sent to jail in 10 arson cases from 2016 when the Bangladesh Nationalist Party was waging an anti-government movement. On 4 June 2017, he received bail in seven cases from 2007 to 2015. On 13 June, Bangladesh Supreme Court Justice Hasan Foez Siddique upheld his bail in five cases. On 18 June, the High Court Division ordered the government to let Khokon travel abroad for Hajj. On 10 October he was charged with assaulting police officers in a protest against filing cases against Khaleda Zia.

Khokon is the Senior Joint Secretary of the Bangladesh Nationalist Party. He was nominated by Bangladesh Nationalist Party to contest the 2018 Bangladesh General Election.

On 28 November 2019, Khokon received bail in a case over vandalism and assaulting police officers near the High Court along with Hafizuddin Ahmed.

On 15 September 2022, charges were framed against Khokon in the assault case from October 2017.
