= Manikganj-4 =

Constituency of Bangladesh's Jatiya Sangsad

- Former constituency for the Jatiya Sangsad
- District: Manikganj District
- Division: Dhaka Division

Former constituency
- Created: 1984
- Abolished: 2006

Manikganj-4 is a defunct constituency represented in the Jatiya Sangsad (National Parliament) of Bangladesh abolished in 2006.

== Members of Parliament ==
Election	Member	Party
1986	Golam Sarwar Milon	Jatiya Party
1991	Shamsul Islam Khan	BNP
2006 by-election	Moinul Islam Khan	BNP
Abolished constituency

Shamsul Islam Khan died in January 2006. Moinul Islam Khan was elected in a May 2006 by-election.
