= Razina Islam =

Bangladeshi politician

Member of Bangladesh Parliament
- In office 2005–2006

Personal details
- Political party: Bangladesh Nationalist Party

Razina Islam is a Bangladeshi politician who served as a member of the Jatiya Sangsad, Bangladesh's parliament, from a reserved seat. She was elected to parliament in 2005 as a Bangladesh Nationalist Party candidate.
