= Naima Sultana =

Bangladeshi politician

Member of Bangladesh Parliament
- In office 2005–2006

Personal details
- Political party: Islami Oikya Jote

Naima Sultana is an Islami Oikya Jote politician and a former member of parliament from a reserved seat.

== Career ==
Sultana was elected to the Parliament of Bangladesh from a reserved seat as an Islami Oikya Jote candidate in 2005.
