= Jhenaidah-3 =

Constituency of Bangladesh's Jatiya Sangsad

Coordinates: 23.36°N 88.92°E

- Constituency for the Jatiya Sangsad
- District: Jhenaidah District
- Division: Khulna Division
- Electorate: 431,015 (2026)

Current constituency
- Created: 1984
- Party: Bangladesh Jamaat-e-Islami
- Member: Md. Motiar Rahman
- ← 82 Jhenaidah-2 84 Jhenaidah-4 →

Jhenaidah-3 is a constituency represented in the Jatiya Sangsad (National Parliament) of Bangladesh since 2026 by Md. Motiar Rahman of the Bangladesh Jamaat-e-Islami.

== Boundaries ==
The constituency encompasses Kotchandpur and Maheshpur upazilas.

== History ==
The constituency was created in 1984 from a Jessore constituency when the former Jessore District was split into four districts: Jhenaidah, Jessore, Magura, and Narail.

== Members of Parliament ==
Election	Member	Party
1986	ASM Mozammel Haque	Bangladesh Jamaat-e-Islami
1988	Shamsul Huda Khan	Jatiya Party
1991	Shahidul Islam Master	Bangladesh Nationalist Party
Feb 1996	Shahidul Islam Master	Bangladesh Nationalist Party
Jun 1996	Shahidul Islam Master	Bangladesh Nationalist Party
2001	Shahidul Islam Master	Bangladesh Nationalist Party
2008	Shafiqul Azam Khan	Awami League
2014	Nobi Newaz	Awami League
2018	Shafiqul Azam Khan	Awami League
2024	Salahuddin Miaji	Awami League
2026	Md. Motiar Rahman	Bangladesh Jamaat-e-Islami

== Elections ==
=== Elections in the 2020s ===
General Election 2026: Jhenaidah-3
Party	Candidate	Votes	%	±%
Jamaat	Md. Motiar Rahman	175,857	53.3	N/A
BNP	Mohammad Mehedi Hasan	149,821	45.4	N/A
IAB	Sarwar Hossain	3,820	1.2	N/A
GOP	Md. Suman Kabir	388	0.1	N/A
Majority		26,036	7.9	N/A
Turnout		329,886	76.5	N/A
Registered electors		431,015		
Jamaat gain from AL				

=== Elections in the 2010s ===
General Election 2014: Jhenaidah-3
Party	Candidate	Votes	%	±%
AL	Nobi Newaz (Note: Sources vary with regard to the 2014 vote count. They report between 46,105 and 46,701 votes for the winner, and between 1,465 and 1,489 votes for the runner up. Moreover, the Dhaka Tribune, although generally reliable, has the names and vote counts flipped. It is contradicted by Bangladesh Sangbad Shangstha, Banglanews24.com, Amarmp.com, and the website of the Bangladesh Parliament.)	46,701	96.3	+51.0
JP(E)	Md. Kamruzzaman Swadhin	1,489	3.1	N/A
Independent	Shafiqul Azam Khan	311	0.6	N/A
Majority		45,212	93.2	+79.2
Turnout		48,501	15.3	−78.9
AL hold				

=== Elections in the 2000s ===
General Election 2008: Jhenaidah-3
Party	Candidate	Votes	%	±%
AL	Shafiqul Azam Khan	118,357	45.3	+7.0
Jamaat	Matiar Rahman	81,739	31.3	N/A
BNP	Shahidul Islam Master	59,014	22.6	−35.2
IAB	Saroar Hossain	1,409	0.5	N/A
Independent	Md. Abdul Mannan	450	0.2	N/A
Independent	Sazzatuj Jumma	214	0.1	N/A
Majority		36,618	14.0	−5.4
Turnout		261,183	94.2	+5.5
AL gain from BNP				

General Election 2001: Jhenaidah-3
Party	Candidate	Votes	%	±%
BNP	Shahidul Islam Master	127,023	57.8	+20.6
AL	Sazzatuj Jumma	84,289	38.3	+9.5
Independent	Parvin Talukder	5,628	2.6	N/A
IJOF	Md. A. Rahman Dhabok	2,750	1.3	N/A
Jatiya Party (M)	Md. Jamir Hossain Manik	233	0.1	N/A
Majority		42,734	19.4	+14.2
Turnout		219,923	88.7	−0.1
BNP hold				

=== Elections in the 1990s ===
General Election June 1996: Jhenaidah-3
Party	Candidate	Votes	%	±%
BNP	Shahidul Islam Master	65,725	37.2	−6.5
Jamaat	ASM Mozammel Haque	56,458	32.0	+0.1
AL	Sazzatuj Jumma	50,882	28.8	+6.5
JP(E)	Md. Khalekuzzaman Chowdhury	2,496	1.4	N/A
Jatiya Samajtantrik Dal-JSD	Md. Abdul Mannan	741	0.4	+0.2
Gano Forum	Md. Mosharaf Hossain	353	0.2	N/A
Majority		9,267	5.2	−6.6
Turnout		176,655	88.8	+14.8
BNP hold				

General Election 1991: Jhenaidah-3
Party	Candidate	Votes	%	±%
BNP	Shahidul Islam Master	61,391	43.7	
Jamaat	ASM Mozammel Haque	44,861	31.9	
AL	Sazzatuj Jumma	31,412	22.3	
Zaker Party	Momtaz Uddin Chowdhury	1,409	1.0	
IOJ	Zoadur Rahim	782	0.6	
JSD	S. M. Sabdar Rahman	413	0.3	
Jatiya Samajtantrik Dal-JSD	Ali Bakhsh	278	0.2	
Majority		16,530	11.8	
Turnout		140,546	74.0	
BNP gain from				
