= Abdur Razzak Khan =

Bangladeshi politician

Member of Parliament from Patuakhali-4
- In office 1986–1990
- Preceded by: Abdul Baten
- Succeeded by: Anwarul Islam

Personal details
- Born: 12 October 1946 Patuakhali District
- Died: 16 June 2016 (aged 69) National Institute of Cardiovascular Diseases, Bangladesh
- Party: Jatiya Party (Ershad)

Abdur Razzak Khan (12 October 1946 – 16 June 2016) was a Jatiya Party (Ershad) politician and member of parliament for Patuakhali-4. He was an organizer of the Liberation War of Bangladesh.

== Early life ==
Abdur Razzak Khan was born on 12 October 1946 in Patuakhali District.

== Career ==
Khan was the central vice chairman of the Jatiya Party and the president of the Patuakhali District Jatiya Party. He was a former director of Janata Bank and former commander of Muktijoddha Sangsad Patuakhali district. He was elected to parliament from Patuakhali-4 as a Jatiya Party candidate in 1986 and 1988.

== Death ==
Abdur Razzak Khan died on 16 June 2016.
