= Jessore-4 =

Constituency of Bangladesh's Jatiya Sangsad

Coordinates: 23.22°N 89.35°E

- Constituency for the Jatiya Sangsad
- District: Jessore District
- Division: Khulna Division
- Electorate: 386,892 (2018)

Current constituency
- Created: 1973
- Party: Bangladesh Jamaat-e-Islami
- Member of Parliament: Ghulam Rasul
- ← 87 Jessore-3 89 Jessore-5 →

Jessore-4 is a constituency represented in the Jatiya Sangsad (National Parliament) of Bangladesh.

== Boundaries ==
The constituency encompasses Abhaynagar and Bagherpara upazilas, and one union parishad of Jessore Sadar Upazila: Basundia.

== History ==
The constituency was created for the first general elections in newly independent Bangladesh, held in 1973.

Ahead of the 2008 general election, the Election Commission redrew constituency boundaries to reflect population changes revealed by the 2001 Bangladesh census. The 2008 redistricting altered the boundaries of the constituency.

Ahead of the 2014 general election, the Election Commission altered the boundaries of the constituency. Previously it included four more union parishads of Jessore Sadar Upazila: Fathehpur, Ichhali, Kachua, and Narendrapur, but did not include Abhaynagar Upazila.

== Members of Parliament ==
Election	Member	Party
1973	Mohammad Moinuddin Miazi	Awami League
1979	Mozammel Haque	Islamic Democratic League
Major Boundary Changes
1986	Shah Hadiizzzaman	Awami League
1988	M. Nazim Uddin Al Azad	Jatiya party
1991	Shah Hadiuzzaman	Awami League
Feb 1996	Nazrul Islam	BNP
Jun 1996	Shah Hadiizzzaman	Awami League
2001	M. M. Amin Uddin	BJP
2008	Ranajit Kumar Roy	Awami League
2024	Enamul Haque Babul	Awami League
2024	Golam Rasul	Bangladesh Jamaat-e-Islami

== Elections ==
=== Elections in the 2020s ===
General election 2026: Jessore-4
Party	Candidate	Votes	%	±%
BMJP	Sukriti Kumar Mondal			
BNP	Matiar Rahman Faraazi			
Jamaat	Md Golam Rasul			
GOP	Md. Abul Kalam Gazi			
IAB	Biozid Hossain			
JP(E)	Md Jahurul Haque			
Khelafat Majlis	Maulana Ashek Elahi			
Independent	M Nazimuddin Al Azad			
Majority				
Turnout				

=== Elections in the 2010s ===
General Election 2014: Jessore-4
Party	Candidate	Votes	%	±%
AL	Ranajit Kumar Roy	77,362	68.3	+17.6
Independent	Sheikh Abdul Wahab	35,860	31.7	N/A
Majority		41,502	36.7	+34.0
Turnout		113,222	33.4	−57.8
AL hold				

=== Elections in the 2000s ===
General Election 2008: Jessore-4
Party	Candidate	Votes	%	±%
AL	Ranajit Kumar Roy	102,958	50.7	+8.2
BNP	T. S. Ayub	97,520	48.0	−4.7
Independent	M. Nazim Uddin Al Azad	2,304	1.1	N/A
PDP	Add. Md. Ishaque	265	0.1	N/A
Jatiya Samajtantrik Dal-JSD	Kazi Ali Hider	220	0.1	N/A
Majority		5,438	2.7	−7.5
Turnout		203,267	91.2	+5.0
AL gain from BJP				

General Election 2001: Jessore-4
Party	Candidate	Votes	%	±%
BJP	M. M. Amin Uddin	126,540	52.7	+29.8
AL	Shah Hadiuzzaman	101,994	42.5	+6.2
IJOF	Md. Nazmul Huda	10,381	4.3	N/A
WPB	Boikuntha Bihari Ray	800	0.3	−0.3
Independent	Md. Alamgir Hossain	179	0.1	N/A
Independent	A. K. M. Ishaq	141	0.1	N/A
Majority		24,546	10.2	−2.9
Turnout		240,035	86.2	+2.2
BJP gain from AL				

=== Elections in the 1990s ===
General Election June 1996: Jessore-4
Party	Candidate	Votes	%	±%
AL	Shah Hadiuzzaman	69,194	36.3	+2.0
JP(E)	M. M. Amin Uddin	44,263	23.2	+6.5
BNP	M. Nazim Uddin Al Azad	43,611	22.9	+0.1
Jamaat	Abdul Aziz	25,112	13.2	+9.1
IOJ	Md. Nazmul Huda Munshi	5,561	2.9	+0.7
Zaker Party	Munshi Abdur Razzak	1,366	0.7	−1.7
WPB	Md. Zakir Hossain Hobi	1,064	0.6	N/A
Jatiya Samajtantrik Dal-JSD	Md. M. A. Salam	394	0.2	−0.1
Majority		24,931	13.1	+1.6
Turnout		190,565	84.0	+13.7
AL hold				

General Election 1991: Jessore-4
Party	Candidate	Votes	%	±%
AL	Shah Hadiuzzaman	55,008	34.3	
BNP	Nazrul Islam	36,590	22.8	
JP(E)	M. M. Amin Uddin	26,832	16.7	
Jamaat	Abdul Aziz	25,698	16	
Independent	M. Nazim Uddin Al Azad	6,524	4.1	
Zaker Party	Nur Mohammad	3,797	2.4	
IOJ	Nazmul Huda	3,579	2.2	
UCL	Zakir Hossain	754	0.5	
Bangladesh Hindu League	Shankar Chokrabarti	573	0.4	
Jatiya Biplobi Front	Mizanur Rahman	477	0.3	
Jatiya Samajtantrik Dal-JSD	Mosharaf Hossain	462	0.3	
Bangladesh Muslim League (Kader)	A. Kaium	301	0.2	
Majority		18,418	11.5	
Turnout		160,598	70.3	
AL gain from				
