= A. Q. M. Badruddoza Chowdhury =

President of Bangladesh from 2001 to 2002

- একিউএম বদরুদ্দোজা চৌধুরী
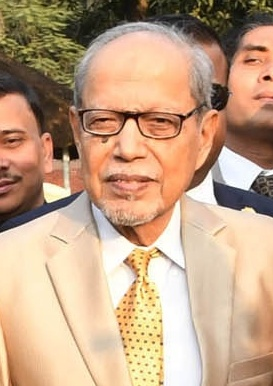
- Chowdhury in 2019

President of Bangladesh
- In office 14 November 2001 – 21 June 2002
- Prime Minister: Khaleda Zia
- Preceded by: Shahabuddin Ahmed
- Succeeded by: Muhammad Jamiruddin Sircar (acting)

Minister of Foreign Affairs
- In office 10 October 2001 – 14 November 2001
- Prime Minister: Khaleda Zia
- Preceded by: Latifur Rahman
- Succeeded by: Morshed Khan

Deputy Prime Minister of Bangladesh
- In office 15 April 1979 – 23 August 1979 Serving with Moudud Ahmed
- President: Ziaur Rahman
- Prime Minister: Shah Azizur Rahman
- Preceded by: Office established
- Succeeded by: Jamal Uddin Ahmad

General Secretary of Bangladesh Nationalist Party
- In office 1979–1981
- Chairman: Ziaur Rahman
- Preceded by: Position established
- Succeeded by: Nurul Islam Shishu

Personal details
- Born: 11 October 1930 Comilla, Bengal Presidency, British India
- Died: 5 October 2024 (aged 93) Dhaka, Bangladesh
- Party: Bikalpa Dhara Bangladesh (2004–2024)
- Other political affiliations: Bangladesh Nationalist Party (1978–2002); Four Party Alliance (2001–2003)
- Spouse: Hasina Warda Chowdhury
- Children: Mahi B. Chowdhury
- Parent: Kafiluddin Chowdhury (father)
- Relatives: Panna Kaiser (sister-in-law)
- Education: Dhaka Medical College
- Awards: Independence Day Award

Abdul Qasim Mohammad Badruddoza Chowdhury (Note: Bengali: আব্দুল কাসেম মোহাম্মদ বদরুদ্দোজা চৌধুরী, romanized: Abdul Kasem Mohammad Badruddoza Chowdhury /bʌdˌruːdoʊˈzɑː ˈtʃoʊdri/) (11 October 1930 – 5 October 2024) was a Bangladeshi politician who served as the president of Bangladesh from 14 November 2001 until his dismissal on 21 June 2002. He was the founding secretary-general of the Bangladesh Nationalist Party (BNP).

Chowdhury was also a physician, cultural activist, author, essayist, playwright, television presenter, and an orator of distinction. He was awarded the National Television Award in 1976 and Independence Day Award for his contribution to medical science in 1993.

== Early life ==
Badruddoza Chowdhury was born in his maternal grandfather's house in Comilla on 11 October 1930. His grandfather's home was in Majidpur Dayhata, Sreenagar, Bikrampur (now Munshiganj District). His father, Kafiluddin Chowdhury, was the general secretary of the United Front, serving as a minister in the United Front provincial cabinet of the then East Pakistan and an Awami League leader. His mother was Sufia Khatun. Badruddoza had an elder brother, AQM Shamsuddoha Chowdhury (d. 2018), an industrialist and a younger sister, Rashida Doha.

Chowdhury passed his SSC from St. Gregory's School in 1947 and HSC from Dhaka College in 1949. He earned his MBBS degree from Dhaka Medical College in 1954–1955.

== Medical career ==
Chowdhury started his career in the medical profession. He served as an associate professor of medicine at Rajshahi Medical College in 1964 and Sir Salimullah Medical College during 1964–1970 and professor of medicine at Sylhet Medical College in 1970. He served as the president of the National Anti-Tuberculosis Association of Bangladesh (NATAB) and president of the International Union Against Tuberculosis of Lung Diseases (IUATLD) of Asia Pacific Zone.

== Political career ==
Being inspired by Ziaur Rahman, the founder chairman of the party, Chowdhury entered into politics as the secretary general of the BNP during its early years. He won the parliament election of 1979 as a BNP nominee from Munshiganj and served as cabinet minister during the years 1979–1982. When the BNP again won parliamentary elections in 1991, after a short stint as Education and Cultural Affairs Minister (from 20 March 1991 until 19 September 1991), he was appointed Deputy Leader of the House of the Bangladeshi parliament.

== Presidency ==
Chowdhury was appointed as the foreign minister of Bangladesh when the BNP party came to power in 2001. In November 2001, he was elected the president of Bangladesh by Jatiya Sangsad members. Seven months later, the incident of him deciding not to visit BNP founder Ziaur Rahman's grave on the anniversary of his death provoked the party members. They accused him of betraying the party. In June 2002, Chowdhury resigned from office as was asked by the ruling party before the situation escalated further.

== Bikalpa Dhara ==
Chowdhury felt the need for a third force in the de facto two-party democracy in Bangladesh. He expressed recruiting civil society members in politics to fight corruption and terrorism and establish good governance in the country through an alternate stream (lit. Bikalpa Dhara) political party. He, along with his son Mahi B. Chowdhury and BNP parliamentarian M A Mannan, resigned from the BNP to work for the new political party. Chowdhury was the president, with M A Mannan as the secretary-general of the new party, Bikalpa Dhara Bangladesh, formed in March 2004. It had been a strong critic of the government during the time, and most of its members defected from the ruling BNP.

For a brief period Chowdhury joined with senior statesman Oli Ahmed. Along with various senior ministers from the BNP cabinet, they formed the Liberal Democratic Party (LDP) Bangladesh. This did not last, and Chowdhury decided to come out of LDP and concentrate his efforts on reviving Bikalpa Dhara.

Chowdhury has been the party's president since its inception, except for a brief period between December 2008 and April 2009, during which time he had resigned from his post after the party could secure no seats during the 9th parliament elections.

== Personal life and death ==
Chowdhury was married to Hasina Warda Chowdhury. Together they had a son, Mahi B. Chowdhury, and two daughters, Muna and Shaila.

Chowdhury died from a lung infection at the Medical College for Women and Hospital on 5 October 2024, at the age of 93.
