= Bilkis Islam =

Bangladeshi politician

- বিলকিস ইসলাম

Member of the Bangladesh Parliament for Women's Reserved Seat-7
- Incumbent
- Assumed office 3 May 2026
- Preceded by: Zara Jabeen Mahbub

Member of the Bangladesh Parliament for Women's Reserved Seat-15
- In office 2 September 2005 – 27 October 2006
- Preceded by: Tahura Ali
- Succeeded by: Noor Jahan Begum

Personal details
- Party: Bangladesh Nationalist Party

Bilkis Islam is a Bangladesh Nationalist Party politician and the incumbent Jatiya Sangsad member from the Women's Reserved Seat-7 since May 2026.

== Career ==
Islam was elected to parliament from reserved seat as a Bangladesh Nationalist Party candidate in 2005. As of 2024, she is a member of the BNP executive committee.
