= M. M. Amin Uddin =

Bangladeshi politician

Member of Bangladesh Parliament

Personal details
- Party: Bangladesh Jatiya Party

M. M. Amin Uddin is a Bangladesh Jatiya Party politician and a former member of parliament for Jessore-4.

== Career ==
Uddin was elected to parliament from Jessore-4 as a Bangladesh Jatiya Party candidate in 2001.
