= Shahidul Islam Master =

Bangladeshi politician

Member of Parliament

Personal details
- Born: 1950
- Died: 21 April 2016 (aged 65–66)
- Party: Bangladesh Nationalist Party

Shahidul Islam Master (1950–2016) was a Bangladesh Nationalist Party politician and member of parliament from Jhenaidah-3.

== Career ==
Master was elected to parliament from Jhenaidah-3 in 1991, 1996, 1996, and 2001. He was the president of the Jhenaidah District unit of the Bangladesh Nationalist Party. In 2008, Bangladesh Nationalist Party activists campaigned against him getting the nomination and accused him of corruption. He was facing 5 extortion cases and two misappropriation of relief goods in court. He was reportedly involved in various unlawful activities, including vote rigging, harassment of dissenting citizens, land encroachment, and ballot box theft in union chairman election.

== Death ==
Master died on 21 April 2016.
