= Mohiuddin Ahmed (Munshiganj politician) =

Bangladeshi politician (1941–2026)

- মহিউদ্দিন আহমেদ
- Preceded by: Position created
- Succeeded by: Md. Abdul Hai

Personal details
- Born: 10 May 1941 Munshiganj, Bengal Province, British India
- Died: 10 March 2026 (aged 84) Dhaka, Bangladesh
- Party: Bangladesh Awami League
- Education: University of Dhaka

Mohiuddin Ahmed (10 May 1941 – 10 March 2026) was a Bangladeshi politician from Munshiganj District. He was elected a member of parliament from Munshiganj-4 in the 1986 Bangladeshi general election.

== Early life and education ==
Mohiuddin Ahmed was born in the village of Kaizjar Char in the Banglabazar Union of Munshiganj, son of Osman Gani and his wife Maluda Begum. He passed SSC from Munshiganj High School in 1981 and HSC and graduation from Government Horganga College. Later he studied at the University of Dhaka.

== Career ==
Ahmed was the sports secretary of the central Chhatra League three times. He was the president of Munshiganj district Awami League and chairman of Munshiganj district council. He was the chief security officer of Sheikh Mujibur Rahman. He was elected a member of parliament from Munshiganj-4 constituency as a Bangladesh Awami League candidate in the 1986 Bangladeshi general election.

== Death ==
Ahmed died from pneumonia at the United Hospital in Dhaka, on 10 March 2026, at the age of 84.
