= Bikalpa Dhara Bangladesh =

Bangladeshi political party

Bikalpa Dhara Bangladesh বিকল্প ধারা বাংলাদেশ Alternate Path Bangladesh
- Leader: Mahi B. Chowdhury
- General Secretary: Abdul Mannan
- Founded: March 2004; 22 years ago
- Split from: Bangladesh Nationalist Party
- Headquarters: Bishwa Road, Dhaka
- Political position: Centre
- Bangladesh Parliament: 0 / 350

Party flag

Bikalpa Dhara Bangladesh (Bengali: বিকল্প ধারা বাংলাদেশ, romanized: Bikôlpa Dhāra Bānglādesh, lit. 'Alternate Path Bangladesh') is a political party in Bangladesh founded by former President of Bangladesh and BNP parliamentarian Dr. A. Q. M. Badruddoza Chowdhury in 2004. Abdul Mannan (BDB secretary general) and recent (BDB women vice-president) Rabaya Begum; two of the most deepest assets of BDB play the most vital role by recruiting and managing the party to promote itself towards its objectives. Their party symbol during the polls is the kula (Bengali: কুলা, a handmade winnowing fan). Its current political alignment is ambiguous.

== Background ==
The party was conceived by Dr Chowdhury in 2003 after he was forced to abdicate his presidency. Dr Chowdhury felt the need of a third force in the de facto two-party democracy in Bangladesh. He expressed recruiting civil society members in politics to fight corruption and terrorism and establish good governance in the country through an alternate stream (lit. Bikalpa Dhara) political party. He, along with his son Mahi B. Chowdhury and BNP parliamentarian M A Mannan resigned from BNP to work for the new political party. Dr Chowdhury was the President, with M A Mannan as the secretary-general of the new party formed in March 2004. It had been a strong critic of the government during the time, and most of its members were defects from the ruling BNP. BNP parliamentarian Oli Ahmed too had defected from BNP bringing with him 24 other senior leaders of BNP to form a new party Liberal Democratic Party in which Bikalpa Dhara was merged on 26 October 2006. However, due to some ideological differences LDP was split and Dr. Chowdhury along with his followers went back to form Bikalpa Dhara again in 2007.

== By-elections in 2004 ==
Article 70 of the Constitution states that a parliamentarian who defects automatically loses his seat. Since both M A Mannan and Mahi B Chowdhury were ruling party parliamentarians during their defection to Bikalpa Dhara, their seats were vacated and by-elections declared. Both the parliamentarians contested for their own seats again.

The Munshiganj-1 district was contested mainly by Momin Ali of BNP and Mahi Chowdhury, (main opposition Awami League boycotted the by-polls) and the BNP-led government was determined to ensure that they retained the seat. The by-election was held on 6 June 2004. Despite considerable opposition from the BNP, Mahi Chowdhury managed to win the elections and enter Parliament as the only opposition member from the BDB.

The Dhaka-10 constituency was contested between former MP M A Mannan and BNP's Mosaddek Ali Falu (main opposition Awami League had boycotted the by-polls). Falu, also political adviser to the Prime Minister, won the elections comprehensively, but the polls were considered to be sham by most observers, including, according to WikiLeaks and the United States Department of State .

Mahi's membership in the Jatiyo Sangshad expired along with the parliament in October 2006.

== 2008 elections and aftermath ==
The party contested the 2008 elections independently, but won no seats during the elections. Party president Dr Chowdhury lost his security money for obtaining only about 5,000 votes in his Dhaka-6 constituency, and came third in his Munshiganj-1 constituency, where he was elected parliamentarian four times in the past. No other Bikalpa Dhara candidates were able to secure seats in the 9th Parliament.

In the emergency presidium meeting on 31 December 2008 just two days after the elections, Dr Chowdhury and M A Mannan, party president and secretary-general took responsibility for the loss, and resigned from their party posts, being appointed chief adviser and adviser to the party respectively. They also congratulated Awami League for their historic win in the elections. Dhaka University's political science professor Nurul Amin Bepari and Mahi B. Chowdhury were appointed acting president and acting secretary-general, respectively.

However, Dr Chowdhury and Mannan were reinstated to their respective roles within the party in April 2009 after a presidium meeting.

== 2009 – present ==
Chowdhury attended political iftars with both Prime Minister Sheikh Hasina (which Khaleda Zia boycotted) and Khaleda Zia (which Sheikh Hasina boycotted).

=== Stances ===
==== Awami League government ====
Bikalpa Dhara believed that the Awami League-led Grand Alliance had failed in fulfilling their duties as the government, and a scheme of having fresh elections at the earliest must be hatched.

==== Caretaker government ====
Bikalpa Dhara opposed the repealing of the Thirteenth Amendment that abolished the caretaker government system in Bangladesh, and stated their liking of the system to the Chief Election Commissioner during a formal dialogue. The party also has agreed to join former foe BNP in a movement to reinstate the caretaker government.

==== General agitations by BNP ====
Bikalpa Dhara hasn't associated themselves with the general agitation movements being led by BNP. For instance, Bikalpa Dhara were invited by BNP to join their mass hunger strike on 12 July. While LDP, another party split from BNP, joined the movement, Bikalpa Dhara declined. The party also stated that it would shun any movements by BNP that they perceived were too hardline and would disrupt the normal passage of life for the people, although they agreed with BNP's cause in general. They were initially undecided about attending BNP's rally on 27 September, and later no reports of Bikalpa Dhara's attendance were found. However, Bikalpa Dhara joined BNP's road march program starting on 10 October.

== Election results ==
=== Jatiya Sangsad elections ===
Election	Party leader	Votes	%	Seats	+/–	Position	Government
2008	A. Q. M. Badruddoza Chowdhury	146,827	0.21%	0 / 300	New	▲11th	Extra-parliamentary
2014	A. Q. M. Badruddoza Chowdhury	Boycotted		0 / 300	0	—N/a	Extra-parliamentary
2018	A. Q. M. Badruddoza Chowdhury	565,940	0.66%	2 / 300	▲2	▲7th	Coalition government
2024	A. Q. M. Badruddoza Chowdhury	1,705	0.00%	0 / 300	▼2	▼	Extra-parliamentary
