= Union councils of Meherpur District =

Union councils of Meherpur District (Bengali: মেহেরপুর জেলার ইউনিয়ন পরিষদসমূহ) are the smallest rural administrative and local government units in Meherpur District of Bangladesh. The district consists of 03 upazilas, 03 thanas, 2 municipalities (1 class, 1st class), 18 unions, 199 mouzas and 255 villages.

== Meherpur Sadar Upazila ==
Meherpur Sadar Upazila is divided into Meherpur Municipality and five union parishads. The union parishads are subdivided into 61 mauzas and 104 villages. Meherpur Municipality is subdivided into 9 wards and 72 mahallas.

- Kutubpur Union
- Buripota Union
- Amjhupi Union
- Amdah Union
- Pirojpur Union

== Mujibnagar Upazila ==
Meherpur Sadar Upazila is divided into four union parishads. The union parishads are subdivided into 29 mauzas and 33 villages.

- Dariapur Union
- Monkhali Union
- Bagoan Union
- Mahajonpur Union

== Gangni Upazila ==
Gangni Upazila is divided into Gangni Municipality and nine union parishads. The union parishads are subdivided into 90 mauzas and 137 villages. Gangni Municipality is subdivided into 9 wards and 29 mahallas.

- Kathuli Union
- Tetulbaria Union
- Kazipur Union
- Bamondi Union
- Monmura Union
- Sholotaka Union
- Saharbati Union
- Dhankhola Union
- Raypur Union
