= Farhad Hossain (politician) =

Bangladeshi politician (born 1972)

- ফরহাদ হোসেন
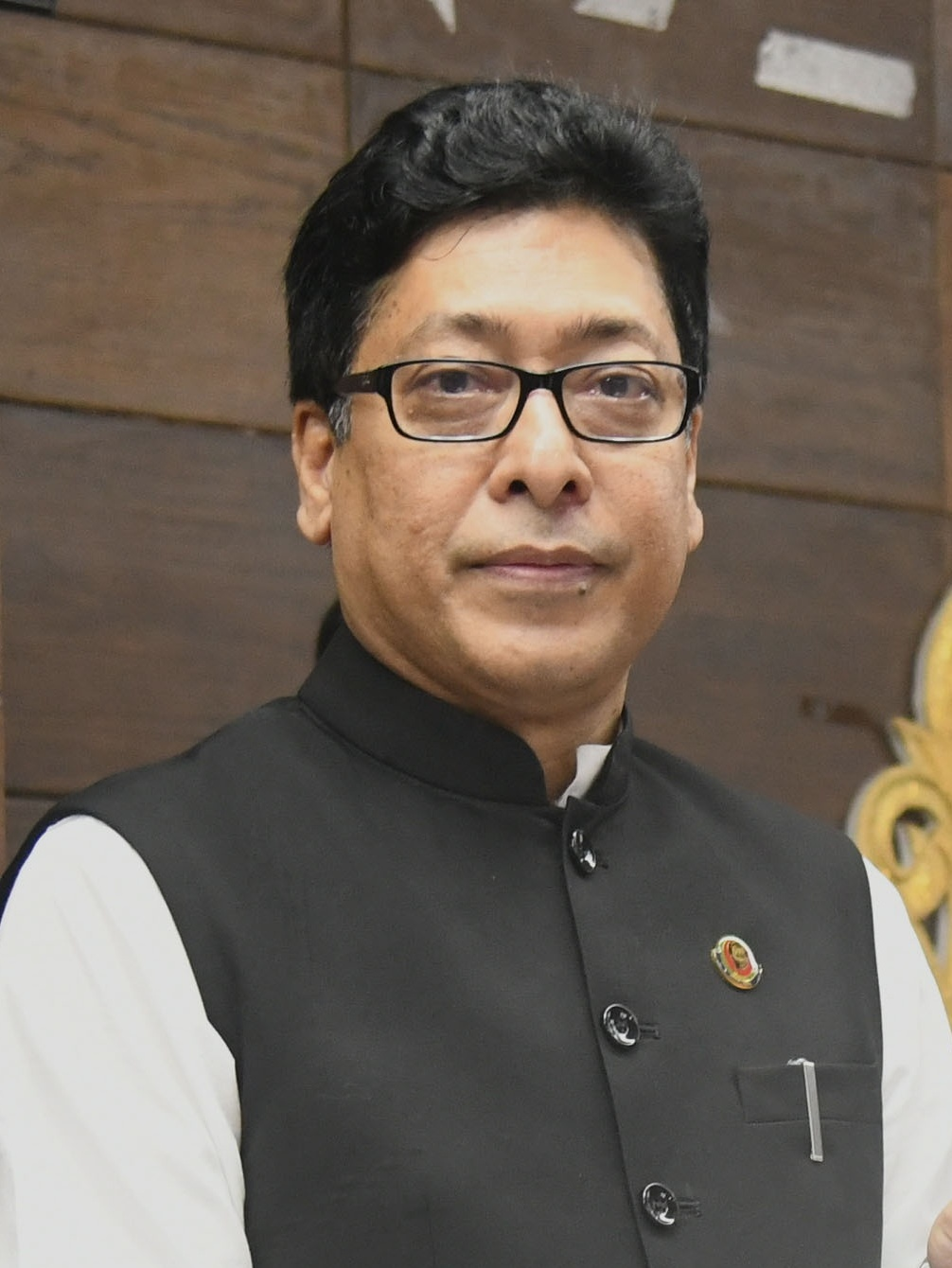
- Hossain at BPATC, Savar (2024)

Minister of Public Administration
- In office 11 January 2024 – 6 August 2024
- Prime Minister: Sheikh Hasina

State Minister of Public Administration
- In office 7 January 2019 – 10 January 2024

Member of the Bangladesh Parliament for Meherpur-1
- In office 25 January 2014 – 6 August 2024
- Preceded by: Joynal Abedin
- Succeeded by: Md. Tajuddin Khan

Personal details
- Born: 5 June 1972 (age 54) Meherpur District, Bangladesh
- Party: Bangladesh Awami League
- Parent: Sahiuddin Bishwas (father)
- Relatives: Syeda Zakia Noor Lipi (sister-in-law)
- Education: University of Dhaka
- Occupation: Politician

Farhad Hossain (born 5 June 1972) is a Bangladesh Awami League politician who is a former minister of public administration and a former Jatiya Sangsad member for the Meherpur-1 constituency.

== Background and early life ==
Hossain was born on 5 June 1972 to a Bengali family of Muslim Biswases in Meherpur, then part of the Kushtia District of Bangladesh. His family was originally from Lalbazar. He completed his master's degree in English. His father, Saheehuddin Biswas, was a politician, a freedom fighter, and one of the founders of the greater Kushtia District Awami League.

== Career ==
Hossain is the president of the Meherpur District unit of the Awami League. He was a lecturer at the Dhaka City College.

Hossain was elected parliament member in 2014 from Meherpur-1 (Meherpur-Mujibnagar) as a candidate of the Awami League. He received 80,146 votes, while independent candidate Md. Yeearul Islam received 13,919 votes. He was a member of the parliamentary standing committee of the Ministry of Finance of the 10th parliament and a member of the sub-committee of the parliamentary standing committee on the Ministry of Finance. He is an executive member of Muktijoddha Kalyan Trust.

Hossain was re-elected to parliament from Meherpur-1 as an Awami League candidate in 2018. He received 197,097 votes while his nearest rival, Masud Arun of the Bangladesh Nationalist Party, received 14,192 votes. On 7 January 2019, he was appointed the state minister of public affairs, the first to be appointed a minister from Meherpur District.

In June 2022, Hossain said there were nearly 400 thousand vacancies in various ministries of the government. Hossain proposed the "Bangladesh Public Service Commission Bill-2022" which would raise the members of the Bangladesh Public Service Commission from 15 to 20.

On 14 September 2024, Hossain was arrested by the Rapid Action Battalion (RAB) in Dhaka's Eskaton area in a murder case filed for killing Rubel, a garment worker, during the 2024 non-cooperation movement.
