= Mohammad Nurul Haque =

Bangladesh Awami League politician

Mohammad Nurul Huq
- মোহম্মদ নূরুল হক

Member of the 3rd Jatiya Sangsad
- In office 7 May 1986 – 3 March 1988
- Succeeded by: Bazlul Huda
- Constituency: Meherpur-2

Member of the East Pakistan Provincial Assembly
- In office 1970–1971

Personal details
- Born: 1 August 1915 Mohammadpur, Meherpur, Nadia district, Bengal
- Died: 27 August 1998 (aged 83) Mohammadpur, Meherpur District, Bangladesh
- Party: Bangladesh Awami League
- Education: Edward College, Pabna; Meherpur High School
- Alma mater: University of Calcutta (BA)

Mohammad Nurul Haque (Bengali: মোহম্মদ নূরুল হক; 1 August 1915 – 27 August 1998) was a Bangladesh Awami League politician and a retired officer of the British Indian Army and the Pakistan Army. He was elected a member of the East Pakistan Provincial Council in 1970 and elected to parliament from Meherpur-2 in 1986.

== Birth and early life ==
Mohammad Nurul Haque was born on 1 August 1915 to the Bengali Muslim Bishwas family of Mohammadpur, a village in Gangni, Meherpur, then located in the Nadia district of the Bengal Presidency. His parents were Mujibuddin Bishwas and Musammat Zia-un-Nesa. He completed his matriculation from Meherpur High School in 1931 and then studied at the Edward College, Pabna until 1933. He graduated from the University of Calcutta in 1935 with a Bachelor of Arts degree.

== Career ==
Nurul Haque began his career at the postal department at Fort William, Calcutta. He transferred to the military in 1939. After completing a nine-months training programme at the Katni centre in the Central Provinces of India, he served as a commissioned officer in New Delhi, Pune, Lucknow, Bombay, Jabalpur, Lahore and other depots. After partition in 1947, Nurul Haque joined the Pakistan Armed Forces but resigned in December of the same year to establish the Haji Bharas Uddin Institution in Hogalbaria-Mohammadpur. He served as its headteacher for 35 years.

He was elected a member of the East Pakistan Provincial Council Awami League candidate in 1970 and elected to parliament from Meherpur-2 as a Bangladesh Awami League candidate in 1986.

== Death ==
Nurul Haque died on 27 August 1998.

== See also ==
- Jatiya Sangsad
