= Anandabas Ten Dome Mosque =

Mosque in Bagoan, Meherpur, Bangladesh

Coordinates: 23°37′36.5″N 88°36′33.1″E

- আনন্দবাস দশ গম্বুজ মসজিদ

Religion
- Affiliation: Islam
- Branch/tradition: Sunni
- District: Meherpur District
- Year consecrated: 19th century
- Status: Active

Location
- Location: Anandabas, Mujibnagar Upazila
- Country: Bangladesh
- Interactive map of Anandabas Ten Dome Mosque

Architecture
- Type: mosque
- Dome: 10

The Ten-Dome Mosque (Bengali: দশ গম্বুজ মসজিদ) is a congregational mosque located in the Pashcim Para of Anandabas village in Bagoan Union, Meherpur District, Bangladesh. It is a mosque with ten domes. Among the seven mosques of Anandabas village, it is the oldest, and the religious establishment is considered a center for the spread of Islam in the region.

== History ==
The exact construction date of the mosque is unknown, but it was built in the mid-19th century (1850 AD) after the arrival of Islamic preachers. The mosque was constructed under the initiative of Dervish Sheikh Farid, together with the villagers. To accommodate a larger congregation, in 1338 Bengali year (1931 AD), the mosque was expanded by adding a two-story building to the front wall of the main structure and a boundary wall was constructed.

== Architecture ==
Red bricks have been used in the masonry of the main building of the mosque, and the walls are thick. On top of it, ten domes of various sizes have been placed.
