= Folk sects in Bengal =

Some of the folk sects, like Balarami, Baul, Sahedhani, Karta bhaja, Matuya, Jagomohani, and Nyadar, are still found in different places in both Bengals.

== Balarami ==
The Balarami Sect was established by Balaram Hari in Meherpur, Nadia district of Bengal Presidency (now in Meherpur District of Bangladesh). This sect believes that life is pure and simple above greed and sensuality. In this sect, preachers, gurus, and avatars are not present. The followers have no peculiar sect marks or uniform. The Muslim disciples call their deity Hari-Allah, while the Hindu disciples use the term Hari rama. The Balaramis are still to be found at some places like Meherpur in Bangladesh and Nischintapur, Shabenagar, Palishipara, Natna, Hawlia, Arshinagor, goribpur in Nadia, Daikiari in Purulia, Shalunigram in Bankura of India, etc.

== Baul ==
The Baul is the most well known folk sect in Bengal. The Baul is a group of mixed elements of the Sahaja and Sufism. The Bauls have a tradition that constitutes both a syncretic religious sect and a musical tradition.

== Sahebdhani ==
The Sahebdhani sect does not believe in either creed or caste. This sect believes in praying together. The disciples belong to both Muslim and Hindu religions. The spiritual guides are called Dinadayal, Dinabandhu by the followers of this sect. The Sahebdhani originated in the village of Brittihuda in the district of Nadia. Kubir Sarkar and Jadubindu are two famous and celebrated Sahebdhani saints.

== Matuya ==
The Matuya Sect originated in Bangladesh around 1860 AD by Harichand Thakur. The followers of this sect are mainly Namasudras, a Scheduled caste group in Bengal. They believe in Vaisnavite Hinduism and self-realization ("Swayam-Dikshiti"). Nowadays, a considerable number of Matuyas are to be found in West Bengal in India.

== Other sects ==
Other important folk sects in Bengal include:

- Karta bhaja
- Jagomohani
- Nyadar

== See also ==
- Matua Mahasangha
