= Meherpur-1 =

Constituency of Bangladesh's Jatiya Sangsad

Coordinates: 23.76°N 88.63°E

- Constituency for the Jatiya Sangsad
- District: Meherpur District
- Division: Khulna Division
- Electorate: 316,975 (2026)

Current constituency
- Created: 1984
- Party: Bangladesh Jamaat-e-Islami
- Member: Md. Tajuddin Khan
- ← 72 Pabna-5 74 Meherpur-2 →

Meherpur-1 is a constituency represented in the Jatiya Sangsad (National Parliament) of Bangladesh since 2026 by Md. Tajuddin Khan of the Bangladesh Jamaat-e-Islami.

== Boundaries ==
The constituency encompasses Meherpur Sadar and Mujibnagar upazilas.

== History ==
The constituency was created in 1984 from the Kushtia-5 constituency when the former Kushtia District was split into three districts: Meherpur, Kushtia, and Chuadanga.

== Members of Parliament ==
Election	Member	Party
1986	Mohammad Shahiduddin	Awami League
1988	Ramjan Ali	Jatiya Party
1991	Abdul Mannan	Awami League
Feb 1996	Ahammad Ali	Bangladesh Nationalist Party
1999 by-election	Abdul Mannan	Awami League
2001	Masud Arun	Bangladesh Nationalist Party
2008	Joynal Abedin	Awami League
2014	Farhad Hossain	Awami League
2018	Farhad Hossain	Awami League
2024	Farhad Hossain	Awami League
2026	Md. Tajuddin Khan	Bangladesh Jamaat-e-Islami

== Elections ==
=== Elections in the 2020s ===
General Election 2026: Meherpur-1
Party	Candidate	Votes	%	±%
Jamaat	Md. Tajuddin Khan	123,271	53.4	N/A
BNP	Masud Arun	105,441	45.7	N/A
JP(E)	Abdul Hamid	1,429	0.6	N/A
CPB	Mizanur Rahman	792	0.3	N/A
Majority		17,830	7.7	N/A
Turnout		230,933	72.9	N/A
Jamaat gain from AL				

=== Elections in the 2010s ===
General Election 2014: Meherpur-1
Party	Candidate	Votes	%	±%
AL	Farhad Hossain	80,146	85.2	+32.1
Independent	Adv. Yarul Islam	13,919	14.8	N/A
Majority		66,227	70.4	+48.3
Turnout		94,065	37.8	−52.8
AL hold				

=== Elections in the 2000s ===
General Election 2008: Meherpur-1
Party	Candidate	Votes	%	±%
AL	Joynal Abedin	107,492	53.1	+14.0
BNP	Masud Arun	62,745	31.0	−26.0
Jamaat	Samir Uddin	30,756	15.2	N/A
IAB	Md. Abul Kalam Kashami	1,506	0.7	N/A
Majority		44,747	22.1	+4.2
Turnout		202,499	90.6	−1.3
AL gain from BNP				

General Election 2001: Meherpur-1
Party	Candidate	Votes	%	±%
BNP	Masud Arun	102,028	57.0	N/A
AL	Abdul Mannan	69,971	39.1	−21.4
IJOF	Motasim Billah Motu	5,532	3.1	N/A
Independent	Md. Shahabuddin	1,424	0.8	N/A
Independent	Md. A. Hamid	109	0.1	N/A
Independent	Md. A. Halim Molla	79	0.0	N/A
Majority		32,057	17.9	−4.6
Turnout		179,143	89.3	+63.6
BNP gain from AL				

Ahmed Ali died in office. Abdul Mannan of the Awami League was elected in a May 1999 by-election.

Meherpur-1 by-election, May 1999
Party	Candidate	Votes	%	±%
AL	Abdul Mannan	26,717	60.5	+23.3
Independent	Hisab Uddin	16,785	38.0	N/A
Independent	Sayed Humayun Kabir Arzu	379	0.9	N/A
Independent	Motasim Billah Motu	174	0.4	N/A
BKSMA	Krishak Md. Sadeque	79	0.2	N/A
Majority		9,932	22.5	+15.8
Turnout		44,134	25.7	−61.4
AL gain from BNP				

=== Elections in the 1990s ===
General Election June 1996: Meherpur-1
Party	Candidate	Votes	%	±%
BNP	Ahammad Ali	60,621	43.9	+8.6
AL	Syeda Zohra Tajuddin	51,366	37.2	+1.2
Jamaat	Samir Uddin	23,929	17.3	−8.9
JP(E)	Ramjan Ali	1,659	1.2	+0.2
Zaker Party	S. M. A. Hasib	390	0.3	0.0
Gano Forum	Al Amin	123	0.1	N/A
Majority		9,255	6.7	+6.0
Turnout		138,088	87.1	+11.2
BNP gain from AL				

General Election 1991: Meherpur-1
Party	Candidate	Votes	%	±%
AL	Abdul Mannan	40,474	36.0	
BNP	Ahammad Ali	39,632	35.3	
Jamaat	Sirajul Haq	29,481	26.2	
Dhumpan O MAdokdrobba Nibaronkari Manabsheba Schansta	Mozammel Haq	1,102	1.0	
JP(E)	Ramjan Ali	1,083	1.0	
Zaker Party	S. M. A. Hasib	364	0.3	
WPB	Akbar Ali	269	0.2	
Majority		842	0.7	
Turnout		112,405	75.9	
AL gain from JP(E)				
