= Meherpur-2 =

Constituency of Bangladesh's Jatiya Sangsad

Coordinates: 23.81°N 88.76°E

- Constituency for the Jatiya Sangsad
- District: Meherpur District
- Division: Khulna Division
- Electorate: 270,705 (2026)

Current constituency
- Created: 1984
- Party: Bangladesh Jamaat-e-Islami
- Member: Md. Nazmul Huda
- ← 73 Meherpur-1 75 Kushtia-1 →

Meherpur-2 is a constituency represented in the Jatiya Sangsad (National Parliament) of Bangladesh since 2026 by Md. Nazmul Huda of the Bangladesh Jamaat-e-Islami.

== Boundaries ==
The constituency encompasses Gangni Upazila.

== History ==
The constituency was created in 1984 from a Kushtia constituency when the former Kushtia District was split into three districts: Meherpur, Kushtia, and Chuadanga.

== Members of Parliament ==
Election	Member	Party
1986	Mohammad Nurul Haque	Awami League
1988	Bazlul Huda	Freedom Party
1991	Abdul Gani	Bangladesh Nationalist Party
Feb 1996	Abdul Gani	Bangladesh Nationalist Party
Jun 1996	Mokbul Hossain	Independent
2001	Abdul Gani	Bangladesh Nationalist Party
2008	Amzad Hossain	Bangladesh Nationalist Party
2014	Mokbul Hossain	Independent
2018	Mohammad Shahiduzzaman	Awami League
2024	Abu Saleh Mohammad Nazmul Huq	Awami League
2026	Md. Nazmul Huda	Bangladesh Jamaat-e-Islami

== Elections ==
=== Elections in the 2020s ===
General Election 2026: Meherpur-2 (Note: The vote count of 1,825 for Abdul Banki is an unofficial result, excluding postal ballots.)
Party	Candidate	Votes	%	±%
Jamaat	Md. Nazmul Huda	96,306	52.3	N/A
BNP	Amzad Hossain	85,988	46.7	N/A
JP(E)	Abdul Baki	1,825	1.0	N/A
Majority		10,318	5.6	N/A
Turnout		184,119	68.0	N/A
Jamaat gain from AL				

=== Elections in the 2010s ===
General Election 2014: Meherpur-2
Party	Candidate	Votes	%	±%
Independent	Mokbul Hossain	46,770	55.3	N/A
AL	MA Khaleque	36,489	43.1	−6.1
Jatiya Party (M)	Md. Abdul Halim	1,323	1.6	N/A
Majority		10,281	12.2	+10.7
Turnout		84,582	40.6	−52.5
Independent gain from BNP				

=== Elections in the 2000s ===
General Election 2008: Meherpur-2
Party	Candidate	Votes	%	±%
BNP	Amzad Hossain	86,768	50.6	−4.9
AL	Mokbul Hossain	84,279	49.2	+6.8
BDB	Amir Uddin Ahmmed	345	0.2	N/A
Majority		2,489	1.5	−11.6
Turnout		171,392	93.1	+5.0
BNP hold				

General Election 2001: Meherpur-2
Party	Candidate	Votes	%	±%
BNP	Abdul Gani	86,750	55.5	+27.3
AL	Mokbul Hossain	66,322	42.4	+40.9
IJOF	Md. Mohsin Ali	3,122	2.0	N/A
Jatiya Party (M)	Md. Abdul Halim	202	0.1	N/A
Majority		20,428	13.1	+3.1
Turnout		156,396	88.1	+2.0
BNP gain from Independent				

=== Elections in the 1990s ===
General Election June 1996: Meherpur-2
Party	Candidate	Votes	%	±%
Independent	Mokbul Hossain	45,820	38.2	N/A
BNP	Abdul Gani	33,861	28.2	−3.2
Jamaat	Abdul Kader	22,590	18.8	−4.6
FP	Bazlul Huda	9,987	8.3	N/A
JP(E)	Md. Mohsin Ali	3,431	2.9	−0.5
WPB	Md. Shohidul Islam	2,119	1.8	N/A
AL	Hisab Uddin	1,771	1.5	−28.6
Zaker Party	Md. Afzalul Haque	334	0.3	−0.6
Gano Forum	Harun-Ar-Radhid	108	0.1	N/A
Majority		11,959	10.0	+8.8
Turnout		120,021	86.1	+12.0
Independent gain from BNP				

General Election 1991: Meherpur-2
Party	Candidate	Votes	%	±%
BNP	Abdul Gani	29,649	31.4	
AL	Hisab Uddin	28,474	30.1	
Jamaat	Abdul Kader	22,100	23.4	
Bangladesh United Communist League	Jalal Uddin	9,770	10.3	
JP(E)	Jalal Uddin	3,250	3.4	
Zaker Party	Afzalul Haque	811	0.9	
Independent	Md. Abul Hussein Molla	475	0.5	
Majority		1,175	1.2	
Turnout		94,529	74.1	
BNP gain from				
