= Ujalpur =

Ujalpur উজলপুর
- Village
- Location in Meherpur, Bangladesh.
- Coordinates: 23.8121°N 88.6265°E
- Country: Bangladesh
- Division: Khulna
- District: Meherpur

Area
  - Total: 1.854 km^{2} (0.716 sq mi)

Population (2011)
  - Total: 4,548
  - Density: 2,453/km^{2} (6,353/sq mi)

Languages
- Time zone: UTC+6:00 (BST)
- PIN: 7100
- Vehicle registration: Meherpur

Ujalpur is a village in Kutubpur union in Meherpur Sadar Upazila of Meherpur, Khulna, Bangladesh. It is the birthplace of Bangladeshi cricketer Imrul Kayes.

== Geography ==
Ujalpur is located at 23.81°N 88.62°E. It has 1170 households and total area 1.854 square kilometres (0.716 sq mi). Ujalpur is bounded by Meherpur town and Kalachandpur on the south, Manoharpur on the north, Jhaubaria and Subidpur on the east, Fatehpur and West Bengal (India) on the west. It is situated on the bank of Bhairab river.

== Demographics ==
As of 2011 Bangladesh census Ujalpur had a population of 4,548. Males constitute 49.95% of the population and females 50.05%. Ujalpur has an average literacy rate of 49.5%, male literacy is 50.6%, and female literacy is 48.3%. In Ujalpur, 18% of the population is under 9 years of age.

== History ==
"Ujyālpūr" (as Irfan Habib spells it) was listed in the Ain-i-Akbari as a mahal in sarkar Mahmudabad. It was listed with an assessed revenue of 37,307 dams (this translation spells the name "Ajiyálpúr").
