= Kalyanpur, Meherpur =

Coordinates: 23°54′40.7″N 88°46′03.0″E

Kalyanpur (Bengali: কল্যাণপুর) is a village in Gangni Upazila, Meherpur District, Bangladesh. According to the 2011 Bangladesh census, Kalyanpur had 734 households and a population of 2,791.

Its post office is Karamdi. The village has two primary schools, a health centre, markets, and dozens of mosques.
