= Md. Nazmul Huda =

Bangladeshi politician

- মোঃ নাজমুল হুদা

Member of the Bangladesh Parliament for Meherpur-2
- Incumbent
- Assumed office 17 February 2026
- Preceded by: Abu Saleh Mohammad Nazmul Huq

Personal details
- Born: September 19, 1958 (age 68) Gangni Upazila, Meherpur District
- Party: Bangladesh Jamaat-e-Islami

Md. Nazmul Huda is a Bangladeshi politician of the Bangladesh Jamaat-e-Islami. He is currently serving as a member of parliament from Meherpur-2.

== Early life ==
Huda was born on 19 September 1958 in Gangni Upazila in Meherpur District.
