= Amzad Hossain (Meherpur politician) =

Bangladeshi politician

Member of Bangladesh Parliament
- In office 2008–2014
- Preceded by: Abdul Gani (Meherpur politician)
- Succeeded by: Md. Mokbul Hossain (Meherpur politician)

Personal details
- Born: 30 December 1958 (age 66)
- Political party: Bangladesh Nationalist Party

Amzad Hossain is a Bangladesh Nationalist Party politician and a former member of parliament for Meherpur-2.

== Biography ==
Amzad Hossain was born on 30 December 1958. He earned his Secondary School Certificate.

Hossain was elected to parliament from Meherpur-2 as a Bangladesh Nationalist Party candidate in 2008.
