= Manjhaul Kothi Indigo Estate =

Historic plantation factory

- A European planter at Kothi, 1933
- Location: Manjhaul, Begusarai district, Bihar, India

History
- Built: c. 1836
- Built for: British colonial planters

Site notes
- Area: 15 square miles (approx. 9,600 acres)
- Management: F. H. Holloway, J. E. Finch (early 20th century)

Manjhaul Indigo Estate also historically referred as Munjhoul Estate or Neel Kothi is a historic Indigo plantation factory located in Manjhaul village of Begusarai District in Indian state of Bihar. The estate was established in 1836 along the banks of Burhi Gandak river. It served as a major economic and agricultural hub during Colonial period.

== Location ==
The estate is situated in the Manjhaul village in the Cheria-Bariarpur division of Begusarai. The main factory building is located on the banks of Burhi Gandak river. It lies roughly 20 kilometers from the Begusarai city.

== History ==
The estate was established in 1836 during the period of Company rule in India, the establishment was part of British efforts in Indigo cultivation in Eastern India. The estate began with an initial average yielding of 9 seers per acre using manual beating. The estate later expanded to 15 square miles (4,500 cultivated acres) under the management of British managers E.J. Finch and F.H. Holloway. The estate was noted as being one of five major Indigo concerns of the region in an 1869 return by officer in charge of Begusarai subdivision. In 1917 British explorer Somerset Playne noted the estate spanning 15 square miles and 4,500 cultivated acres under ziraat. He recorded the precise yield benchmarks—such as the estate planting 700 acres of the highly valued Java indigo strain which yielded an average of 9 seers per acre, alongside high-grade tobacco yielding 8 maunds per acre. Playne further noted that steam water was used only for boiling and pumping river water into the fermentation chambers, while the actual beating and oxidation of the liquid solution was processed entirely by manual labor. He further noted that estate consisted of an elaborate transport infrastructure 65 pairs of oxen and direct commercial ties to the managing agency Begg, Dunlop & Co. in Calcutta for global maritime export. Archival records from the Bihar Digital Archive confirm that the estate was actively staffed and inhabited well into the 1933 interwar period. Photographic logs from 1933 capture operational British planters residing at the Neel Kothi alongside registered estate motor vehicles.

=== Decline and shutdown ===
Following the synthetic dye crisis globally the profit value for Indigo began declining, this caused shutdown of estate operations in mid-20th century.Following India's independence in 1947 and the subsequent implementation of the Bihar Land Reforms Act of 1950 (which abolished the old zamindari/proprietor estate systems), European planters abandoned the property permanently, leaving the factory infrastructure and vats to sit in a state of gradual ruin.

== Architecture ==
The architectural layout of site represents the Anglo-Indian architecture of 19th century, the entire factory complex consisted of a central bungalow (Neel Kothi) and surrounding farmlands for Indigo cultivation. Playne noted site consisted of a well built Planter's bungalow along with cothouses and vats.

== Status ==
The ruins of estate are found along the banks of Gandak river, the preservation remains poorly implemented by local administration and site remains in a state of gradual decay.

== See Also ==
- Bhatpara Neelkuthi – A parallel ruined British indigo factory estate in the Bengal Presidency.
- Champaran Satyagraha – The historic peasant movement against the indigo plantation system in North Bihar.
- Indigo revolt – The broader peasant uprising against indigo planters in Bengal.
