= Sholotaka Union =

Sholotaka Union ষোলটাকা ইউনিয়ন
- Union
- Sholotaka Union
- Location within Bangladesh
- Coordinates: 23.8458°N 88.8094°E
- Country: Bangladesh
- Division: Khulna
- District: Meherpur
- Upazila: Gangni

Area
  - Total: 28.76 km^{2} (11.10 sq mi)

Population (2011)
  - Total: 25,787
  - Density: 896.6/km^{2} (2,322/sq mi)
- Time zone: UTC+6 (BST)
- Website: sholotakaup.meherpur.gov.bd

Sholotaka Union (Bengali: ষোলটাকা ইউনিয়ন) is a union parishad of Gangni Upazila, in Meherpur District, Khulna Division of Bangladesh. The union has an area of 28.76 square kilometres (11.10 sq mi) and as of 2001 had a population of 25,787. There are 17 villages and 19 mouzas in the union.
