= Masud Arun =

Bangladeshi politician

- মাসুদ অরুণ

Member of Parliament
- In office 28 October 2001 – 29 October 2006
- Preceded by: Abdul Mannan
- Succeeded by: Joynal Abedin
- Constituency: Meherpur-1

Personal details
- Born: Meherpur, East Bengal now Bangladesh
- Party: Bangladesh Nationalist Party
- Parent: Ahammad Ali (father)

Masud Arun is a Bangladesh Nationalist Party politician and a former Member of Parliament from Meherpur-1. His father Ahammad Ali was also an MP.

== Career ==
Arun was elected to Parliament from Meherpur-1 in 2001 as a Bangladesh Nationalist Party candidate. He was sued in 2008 for fraud and embezzlement.

== Personal life ==
His brother, Maruf Ahmed Bijon, was the public prosecutor of Meherpur District. He was arrested in 2002 for ransacking a police post and assaulting the officer-in-charge.
