= Bamondi Union =

Bamondi Union বামন্দী ইউনিয়ন
- Union
- Bamondi Union
- Location within Bangladesh
- Coordinates: 23.8941°N 88.7982°E
- Country: Bangladesh
- Division: Khulna
- District: Meherpur
- Upazila: Gangni

Area
  - Total: 29.44 km^{2} (11.37 sq mi)

Population (2011)
  - Total: 26,769
  - Density: 909.3/km^{2} (2,355/sq mi)
- Time zone: UTC+6 (BST)
- Website: bamondiup.meherpur.gov.bd

Bamondi Union (Bengali: বামন্দী ইউনিয়ন) is a union parishad of Gangni Upazila, in Meherpur District, Khulna Division of Bangladesh. The union has an area of 29.44 square kilometres (11.37 sq mi) and as of 2001 had a population of 26,769. There are 15 villages and 10 mouzas in the union.
