= Raypur Union, Gangni =

Raypur Union রায়পুর ইউনিয়ন
- Union
- Raypur Union
- Location within Bangladesh
- Coordinates: 23.0373°N 90.7383°E
- Country: Bangladesh
- Division: Khulna
- District: Meherpur
- Upazila: Gangni

Area
  - Total: 25.35 km^{2} (9.79 sq mi)

Population (2011)
  - Total: 20,665
  - Density: 815.2/km^{2} (2,111/sq mi)
- Time zone: UTC+6 (BST)
- Website: raipurup.meherpur.gov.bd

Raypur Union (Bengali: রায়পুর ইউনিয়ন) is a union parishad situated at Gangni Upazila, in Meherpur District, Khulna Division of Bangladesh. The union has an area of 25.35 square kilometres (9.79 sq mi) and as of 2001 had a population of 20,665. There are 17 villages and 11 mouzas in the union.
