= Kazipur Union =

Kazipur Union কাজিপুর ইউনিয়ন
- Union
- Kazipur Union
- Location within Bangladesh
- Coordinates: 23.9457°N 88.7716°E
- Country: Bangladesh
- Division: Khulna
- District: Meherpur
- Upazila: Gangni
- Established: 1967

Area
  - Total: 35.50 km^{2} (13.71 sq mi)

Population (2011)
  - Total: 50,611
  - Density: 1,426/km^{2} (3,692/sq mi)
- Time zone: UTC+6 (BST)
- Website: kazipurup.meherpur.gov.bd

Kazipur Union (Bengali: কাজিপুর ইউনিয়ন) is a union parishad situated at Gangni Upazila, in Meherpur District, Khulna Division of Bangladesh. The union has an area of 35.50 square kilometres (13.71 sq mi) and as of 2001 had a population of 50,611. There are 9 villages and 5 mouzas in the union.
