= Balaram Hari =

Religious leader of Bengal

- বলরাম হরি

Personal life
- Born: 1825 Meherpur, Nadia, Bengal Presidency, British India
- Died: 1890 Meherpur, Nadia, Bengal Presidency, British India
- Spouse: Maloni
- Occupation: Saint; Religious leader; Song writer

Religious life
- Founder of: Balarami Order
- Philosophy: Humanitarianism; Bhakti

Balaram Hari (Bengali: বলরাম হরি; 1825 –1890; Bengali: 1232 and 30 Agrayan 1297) was a prominent Bengali saint, religious leader, songwriter, and social reformer in Bengal of British India. He established the Balarami sect, also known as the Balaram Bhaja or Balahari sect. The ideal of the Balarami is to lead a pure and simple life, above greed and sensuality. They consider praying to be their fundamental duty. They consider stealing and lying great sins. According to them, the universe is the body of God. Hindu disciples call their deity Hari-Rama, while Muslim disciples use the term Hari-Allah. Balahadis are still to be found at some places like Meherpur (now in Bangladesh), Nishchintapur in Nadia, Daikiari in Purulia, Shalunigram in Bankura, etc.

== Biography ==
Balaram Hari was born in 1825 in Meherpur, Nadia, Bengal Presidency, British India (present-day Meherpur District, Bangladesh) to the family of Gobinda Hari and Gormoni. He was in his youth employed as a watchman in the service of a local family of zemindars, and being very cruelly treated for alleged neglect of duty, he severed his connection with them. After wandering about for some years, he became a religious teacher. Balaram Hari won about twenty thousand followers among the low-caste population and Muslims, and it became the Balarami sect.

He had a knack for inventing puns, though he was quite illiterate. By which he could astonish his audience whenever he talked or debated.

Balaram Hari died in Meherpur, Nadia, Bengal Presidency, British India (present-day Meherpur District, Bangladesh) Nadia in 1890 aged 65.

== Philosophy ==
The philosophy of the Balarami sect he established is one of a pure, simple life above greed and sensuality. He was against the caste system of Hinduism, especially that of the Brahmans. The sect was against idolatry. Certain common attributes of the religions, like preachers, 'gurus', or avatars were not present in his Balarami sect. The followers of Bala Hari have no peculiar sect marks or uniform. According to the Balaram Hari, the human body is made with eighteen attributes. Balaram Hari won about twenty thousand followers among the local low-caste or outcaste populations and Muslims. Some members, who were itinerant, lived on alms. The Balaramis are still to be found at some places like Meherpur of Bangladesh and Nishchintapur, Shabenagar, Palishipara, Natna, Hawlia, Arshinagor, Goribpur in Nadia, Daikiari in Purulia, and Shalunigram in Bankura of India. Some of his notable disciples include Bindabon, Tanu, Ramchandra, Jaldhar, Raju fakir, and Shimanto, and his songs include: "দিব্যযুগে যে হরিরাম / মেহেরপুরে তাঁর নিত্ধাম ", " "রা" শব্দে পৃথিবী বোঝায়/ 'ম' শব্দে জৈবের আশ্রয়।", and "হরিরামতীর্থ নিগূঢ় অর্থ বেদ-বেদান্ত ছাড়া / করে সর্ব ধর্ম পর্যন্ত সেই পেয়েছে ধরা। "

A subsect of Balahari light lamps and candles in the evening at his death place. Some members of the sect are known to celebrate Holi festivals, however Balaram Hari did not instruct them to do so.
