= Monkhali Union =

Monkhali Union মোনখালী ইউনিয়ন
- Union
- Monkhali Union
- Location within Bangladesh
- Coordinates: 23.6677°N 88.6167°E
- Country: Bangladesh
- Division: Khulna
- District: Meherpur
- Upazila: Mujibnagar Sadar

Area
  - Total: 46.96 km^{2} (18.13 sq mi)

Population (2011)
  - Total: 48,175
  - Density: 1,026/km^{2} (2,657/sq mi)
- Time zone: UTC+6 (BST)
- Website: monakhali.meherpur.gov.bd

Monkhali Union (Bengali: মোনখালী ইউনিয়ন) is a union parishad of Mujibnagar Upazila, in Meherpur District, Khulna Division of Bangladesh. The union has an area of 46.96 square kilometres (18.13 sq mi) and as of 2001 had a population of 15,636. There are 7 villages and 6 mouzas in the union.
