= Bhatpara Neelkuthi =

Coordinates: 23.8460°N 88.7015°E

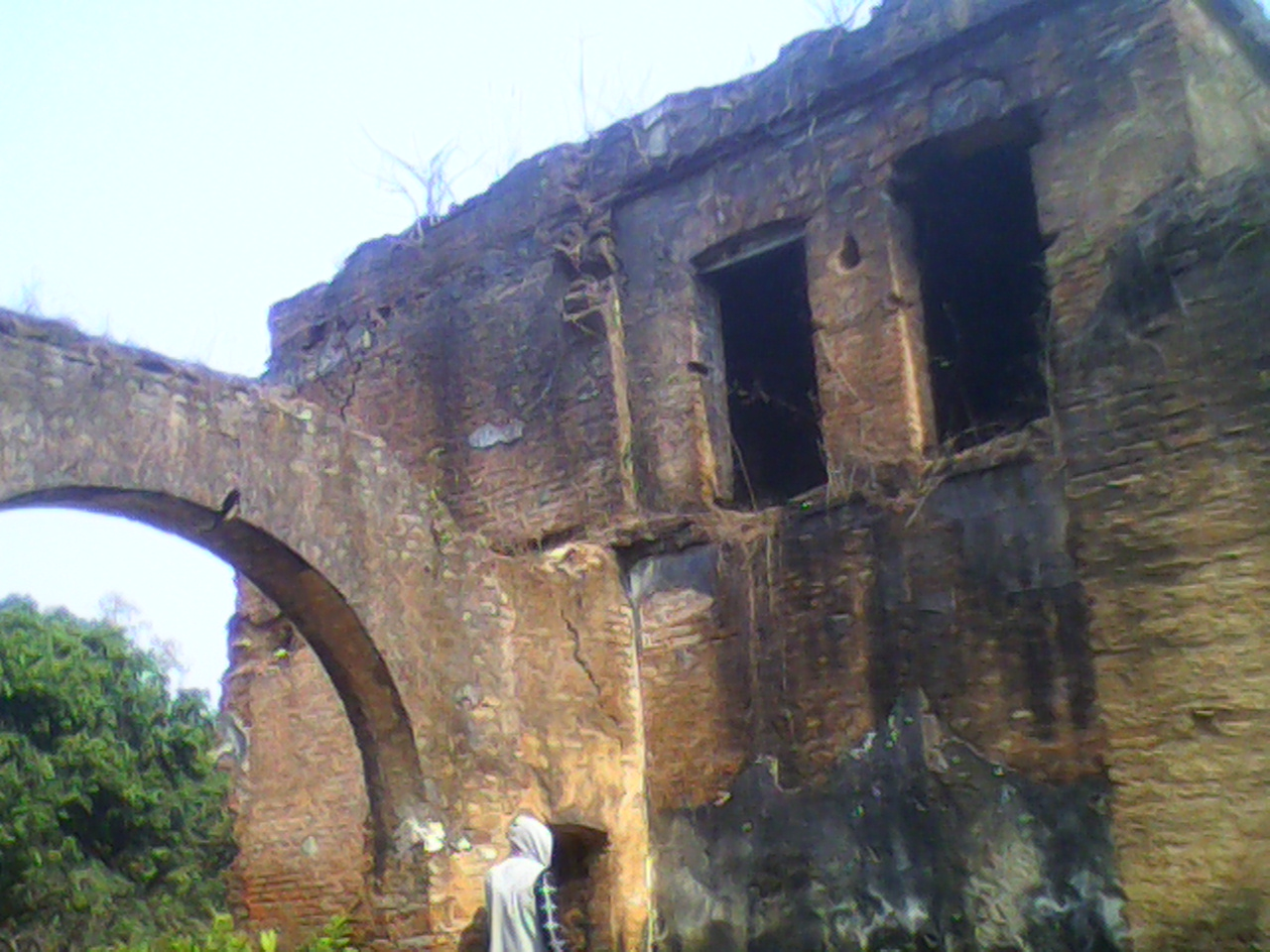
Bhatpara neelkuthi

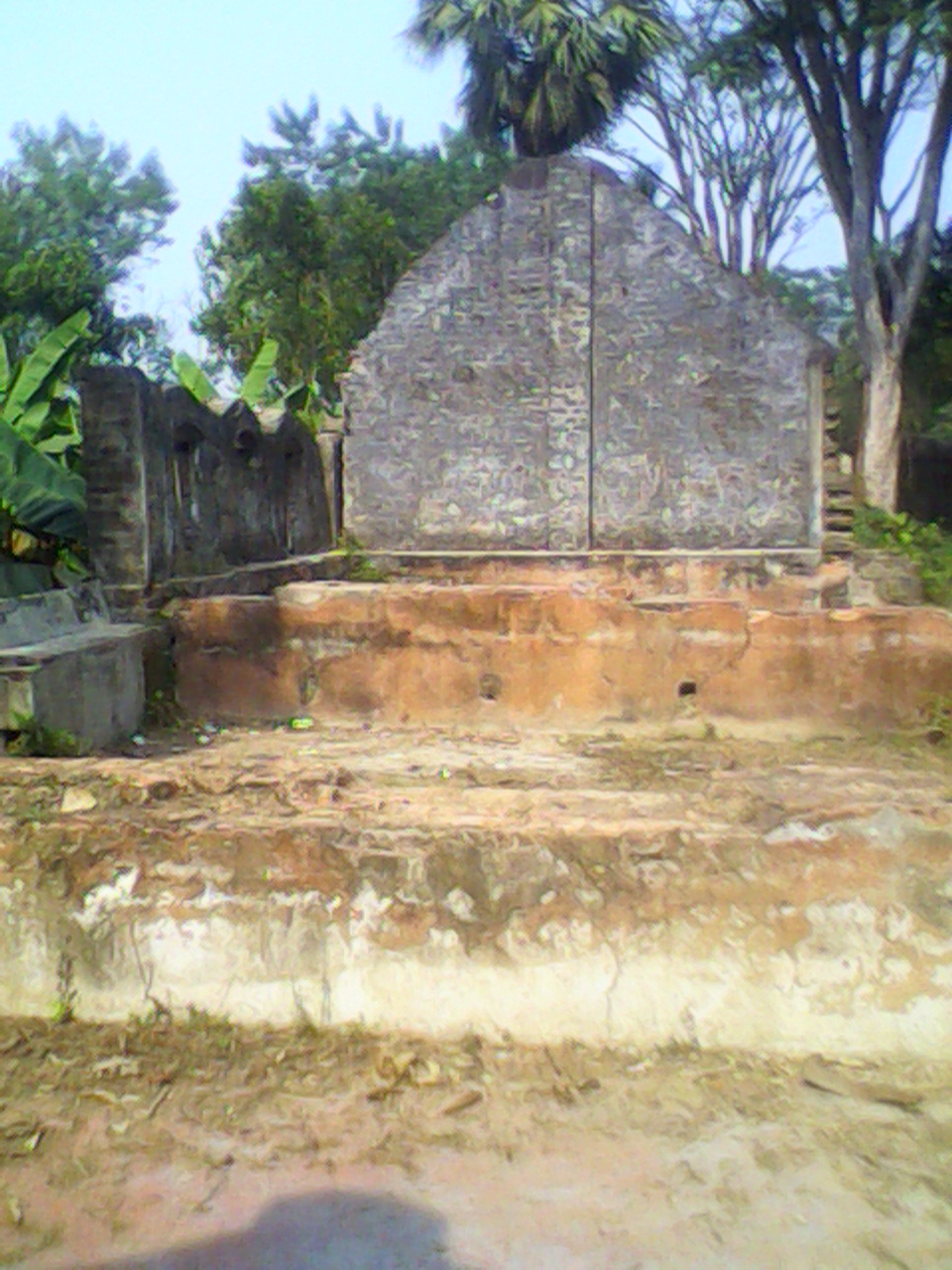
Last part of the church

Bhatpara Neelkuthi (Bengali: ভাটপাড়া নীলিকুঠি) is a ruined indigo factory situated in Gangni Upazila of Meherpur District, Bangladesh. It was built by the British in 1778.

== Location ==
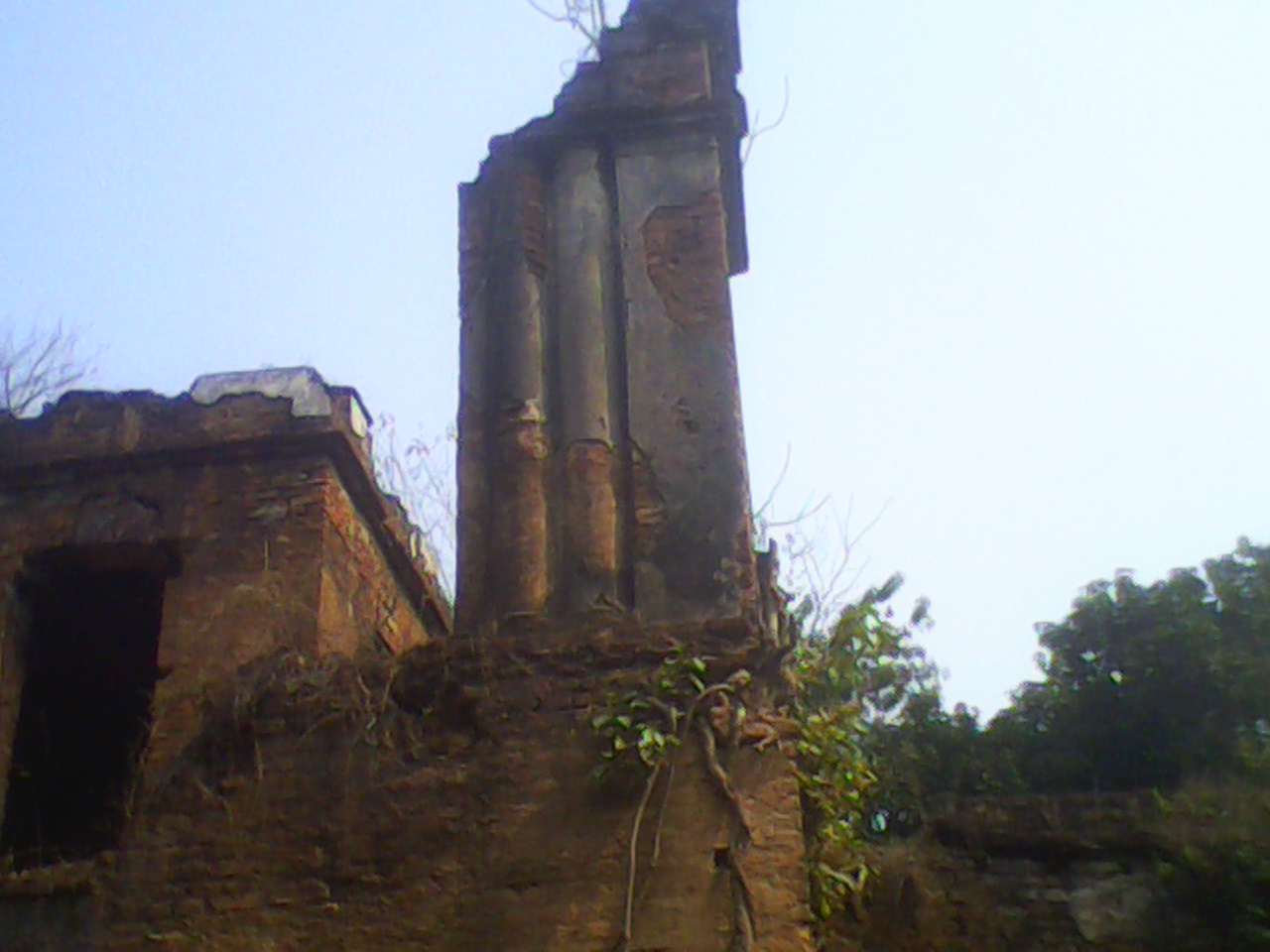
Last part of neel kuthi

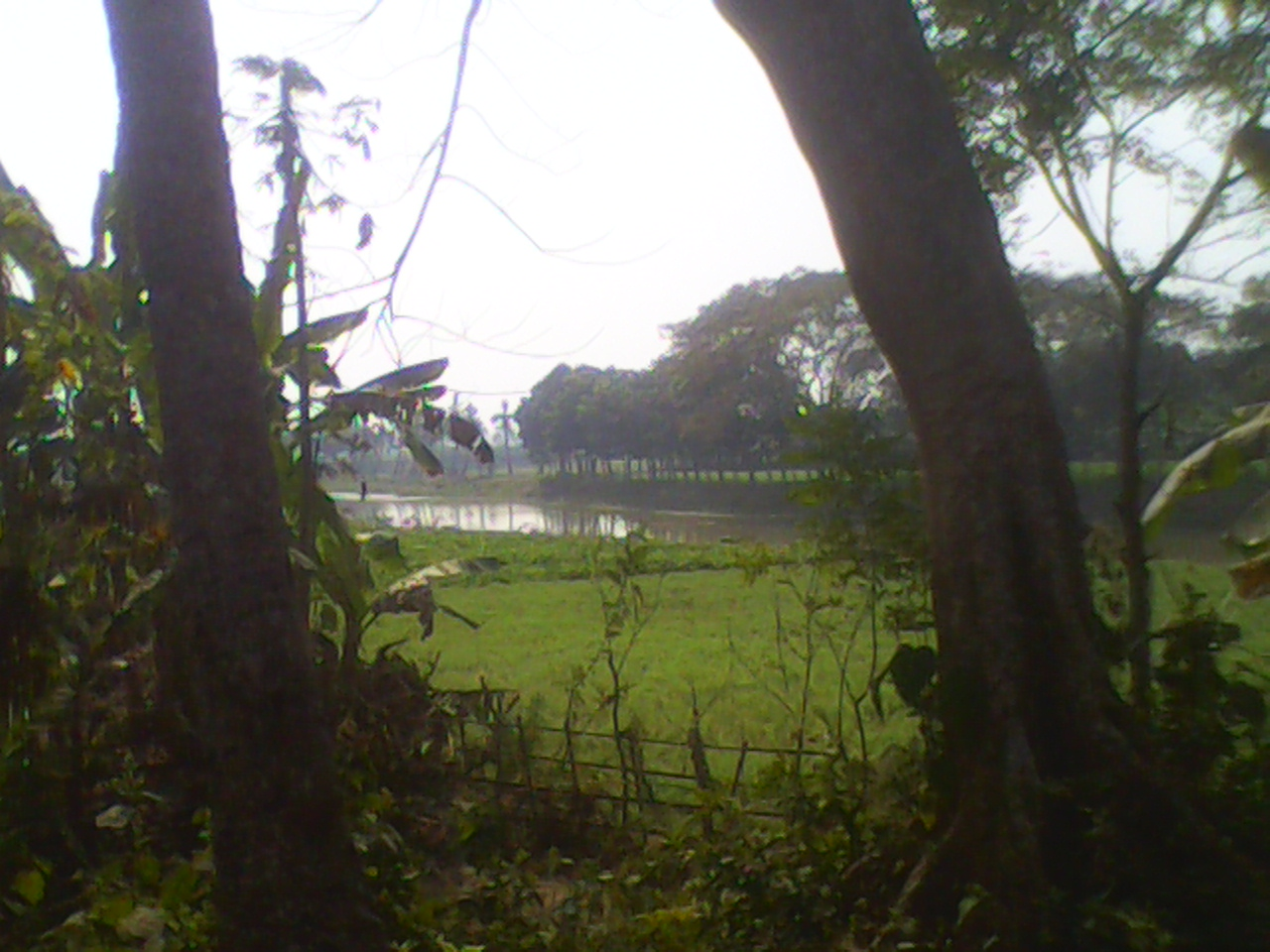
River kazla follows by the neelkuthi

It is about 17 kilometres (11 mi) from Meherpur town. There is a mango garden beside the cottage. There is also a ruined church on the northwest part of the garden. A very shallow river named Kazla flows by the Neelkuthi. It's contemporary to amjhupi Neelkuthi.
