= Joynal Abedin (disambiguation) =

Joynal Abedin may refer to:

== People ==
- Joynal Abedin, also known as V.P. Joynal, Bangladesh Nationalist Party politician
- Joynal Abedin (politician, born 1954), Bangladesh Awami League member of parliament for Meherpur-1
- Joynal Abedin Hazari, Bangladesh Awami League politician and a former member of parliament

== See also ==
- Zainul Abedin (1914–1976), Bengali painter
- Zayn al-Abidin (659–713), Imam in Shiʻi Islam
- Zainul Abedin Museum, Bangladeshi museum
- Zainul Abdin Farroque (born 1949), Bangladesh Nationalist Party politician and former member of parliament
