= Amdah Union =

Amdah Union আমদহ ইউনিয়ন
- Union
- Amdah Union
- Location within Bangladesh
- Coordinates: 23.8168°N 88.6273°E
- Country: Bangladesh
- Division: Khulna
- District: Meherpur
- Upazila: Meherpur Sadar

Area
  - Total: 23.32 km^{2} (9.00 sq mi)

Population (2011)
  - Total: 27,229
  - Density: 1,168/km^{2} (3,024/sq mi)
- Time zone: UTC+6 (BST)
- Website: amdahup.meherpur.gov.bd

Amdah Union (Bengali: আমদহ ইউনিয়ন) is a union parishad situated at Meherpur Sadar Upazila, in Meherpur District, Khulna Division of Bangladesh. The union has an area of 23.32 square kilometres (9.00 sq mi) and as of 2001 had a population of 27,229. There are 12 villages and 5 mouzas in the union.
