= Saharbati Union =

Saharbati Union সাহারবাটি ইউনিয়ন
- Union
- Saharbati Union
- Location within Bangladesh
- Coordinates: 23.8521°N 88.7326°E
- Country: Bangladesh
- Division: Khulna
- District: Meherpur
- Upazila: Gangni

Area
  - Total: 47.63 km^{2} (18.39 sq mi)

Population (2011)
  - Total: 28,356
  - Density: 595.3/km^{2} (1,542/sq mi)
- Time zone: UTC+6 (BST)
- Website: shaharbatiup.meherpur.gov.bd

Saharbati Union (Bengali: সাহারবাটি ইউনিয়ন) is a union parishad situated at Gangni Upazila, in Meherpur District, Khulna Division of Bangladesh. The union has an area of 47.63 square kilometres (18.39 sq mi) and as of 2001 had a population of 28,356. There are 9 villages and 5 mouzas in the union.
