= Amjhupi Union =

Amjhupi Union আমঝুপি ইউনিয়ন
- Union
- Amjhupi Union
- Location within Bangladesh
- Coordinates: 23.8168°N 88.6273°E
- Country: Bangladesh
- Division: Khulna
- District: Meherpur
- Upazila: Meherpur Sadar

Area
  - Total: 66.23 km^{2} (25.57 sq mi)

Population (2011)
  - Total: 27,887
  - Density: 421.1/km^{2} (1,091/sq mi)
- Time zone: UTC+6 (BST)
- Website: amjhupi.meherpur.gov.bd

Amjhupi Union (Bengali: আমঝুপি ইউনিয়ন) is a union parishad situated at Meherpur Sadar Upazila, in Meherpur District, Khulna Division of Bangladesh. The union has an area of 66.23 square kilometres (25.57 sq mi) and as of 2001 had a population of 27,887. There are 20 villages and 15 mouzas in the union.

Amjhupi Nilkuthi is located about six kilometers east of Meherpur town. This kuthi is situated in a beautiful natural environment near the bank of the Kajla river in Dokkhinpara of Amjhupi village. On 13 May 1978, Amjhupi Nilkuthi was considered as a tourist center by the Khulna Development Authority.
