= Abu Saleh Mohammad Nazmul Huq =

Bangladeshi politician (born 1972)

Member of the Bangladesh Parliament for Meherpur-2
- In office 7 January 2024 – 6 August 2024
- Preceded by: Mohammad Shahiduzzaman
- Succeeded by: Md. Nazmul Huda

Personal details
- Born: 13 February 1972 (age 54)
- Party: Awami League

Abu Saleh Mohammad Nazmul Huq (born 13 February 1972) is an Awami League politician and a former Jatiya Sangsad member representing the Meherpur-2 constituency in 2024.

== Career ==
Nazmul Huq was elected to parliament from Meherpur-2 as an Awami League candidate on 7 January 2024.
