= Dariapur Union, Mujibnagar =

Dariapur Union দারিয়াপুর ইউনিয়ন
- Union
- Dariapur Union
- Location within Bangladesh
- Coordinates: 23.7048°N 88.5980°E
- Country: Bangladesh
- Division: Khulna
- District: Meherpur
- Upazila: Mujibnagar

Area
  - Total: 60.74 km^{2} (23.45 sq mi)

Population (2011)
  - Total: 19,629
  - Density: 323.2/km^{2} (837.0/sq mi)
- Time zone: UTC+6 (BST)
- Website: dariapurup.meherpur.gov.bd

Dariapur Union (Bengali: দারিয়াপুর ইউনিয়ন) is a union parishad of Mujibnagar Upazila, in Meherpur District, Khulna Division of Bangladesh. The union has an area of 60.74 square kilometres (23.45 sq mi) and as of 2001 had a population of 19,629. There are 6 villages and 5 mouzas in the union.
