= Motmura Union =

Motmura Union মটমুড়া ইউনিয়ন
- Union
- Location within Bangladesh
- Coordinates: 23.8862°N 88.8346°E
- Country: Bangladesh
- Division: Khulna
- District: Meherpur
- Upazila: Gangni

Area
  - Total: 48.87 km^{2} (18.87 sq mi)

Population (2011)
  - Total: 44,609
  - Density: 912.8/km^{2} (2,364/sq mi)
- Time zone: UTC+6 (BST)
- Website: motmuraup.meherpur.gov.bd

Motmura Union (Bengali: মটমুড়া ইউনিয়ন) is a union parishad of Gangni Upazila, in Meherpur District, Khulna Division of Bangladesh. The union has an area of 48.87 square kilometres (18.87 sq mi) and as of 2001 had a population of 44,609. There are 16 villages and 11 mouzas in the union.
