= Bachhu Mollah =

Bangladeshi politician

- বাচ্চু মোল্লা
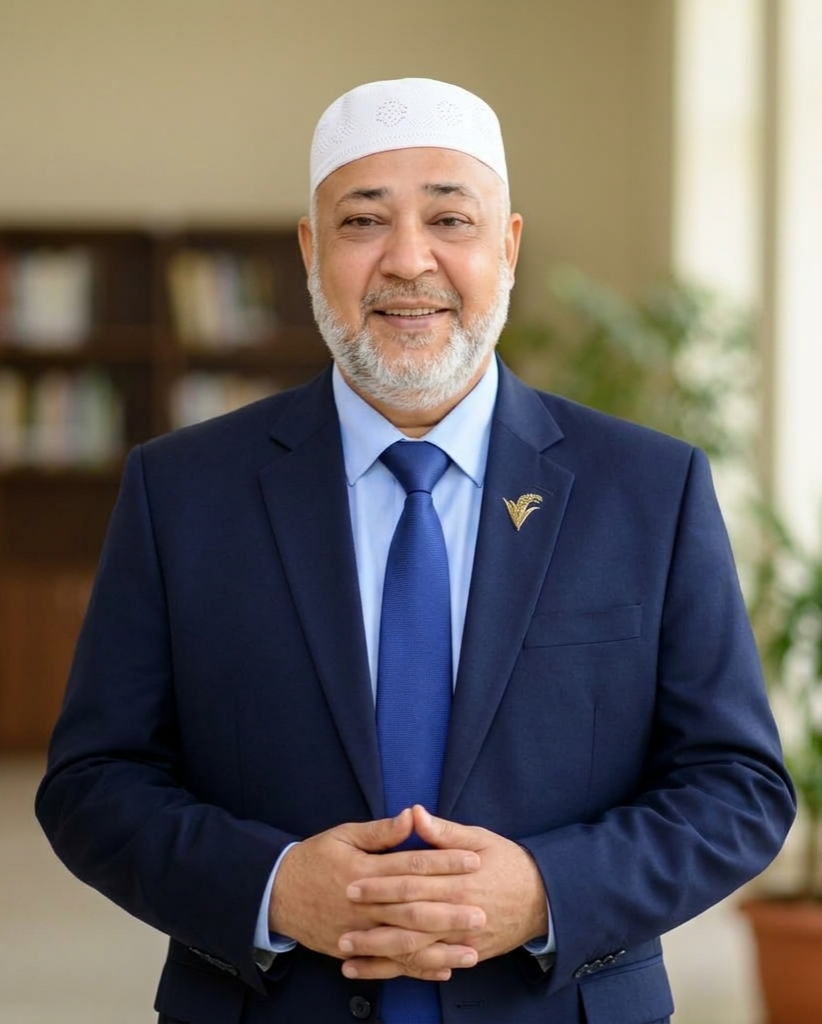
- Mollah in 2026

Member of Parliament for Kushtia-1
- In office 1 March 2004 – 27 October 2006
- Preceded by: Ahsanul Haq Mollah
- Succeeded by: Afaz Uddin Ahmed
- Incumbent
- Assumed office 12 February 2026
- Preceded by: Rezaul Haque Chowdhury

Personal details
- Born: Reza Ahmed Mollah
- Party: Bangladesh Nationalist Party
- Parent: Ahsanul Haq Mollah (father)

Bachhu Mollah is a Bangladesh Nationalist Party politician and a former Jatiya Sangsad member representing the Kushtia-1 constituency.

== Career ==
Mollah was elected to the Jatiya Sangsad from Kushtia-1 as a Bangladesh Nationalist Party (BNP) candidate in a by-election held in March 2004, following the death of the incumbent, his father, Ahsanul Haq Mollah.

He served as a Member of Parliament from 1 March 2004 to 27 October 2006. During his tenure, he represented the people of Kushtia-1 in the national parliament and participated in parliamentary debates and legislative processes. He contributed to policy discussions on national development and coordinated development activities within his constituency. He also worked closely with local administrative authorities to address public issues.

Mollah has been actively involved in the Bangladesh Nationalist Party (BNP) and has held several important organizational roles. He is a member of the BNP National Executive Committee, and previously served as Vice President of Kushtia District BNP and President of Daulatpur Upazila BNP. In these roles, he led grassroots political mobilization, strengthened party structure at the upazila level, and facilitated communication between central leadership and local units. He has also promoted youth participation in political activities.

In the 2026 general election (13th Jatiya Sangsad election), Mollah was re-elected as a Member of Parliament from Kushtia-1 as a BNP candidate. He secured 169,085 votes out of 279,182 votes cast, winning the seat by a margin of approximately 80,000 votes. His victory demonstrated strong public support and political influence in the greater Kushtia region.

Earlier, in the 2004 by-election, he contested as a BNP candidate and received 81,587 votes, winning by a margin of approximately 60,000 votes.

Throughout his political career, Mollah has been involved in various socio-economic development initiatives. He has advocated for rural infrastructure development, supported educational institutions and community initiatives, promoted agricultural development programs, and contributed to improving local communication and public services. He has also encouraged social welfare and poverty reduction activities in his constituency.

Mollah is also recognized for his leadership at the grassroots level, where he organized party activities, strengthened local political structures, and maintained strong engagement with constituents.

He continues the political legacy of his father, Ahsanul Haq Mollah, who was a four-term Member of Parliament and served as State Minister of Post and Telecommunication from 2001 to 2003. His career reflects an ongoing family tradition of political leadership and public service in Kushtia-1.
