= Mahajonpur Union =

Mahajonpur Union মহাজনপুর ইউনিয়ন
- Union
- Mahajonpur Union
- Location within Bangladesh
- Coordinates: 23.6834°N 88.6772°E
- Country: Bangladesh
- Division: Khulna
- District: Meherpur
- Upazila: Meherpur Sadar

Area
  - Total: 66.54 km^{2} (25.69 sq mi)

Population (2011)
  - Total: 18,263
  - Density: 274.5/km^{2} (710.9/sq mi)
- Time zone: UTC+6 (BST)
- Website: mohajanpurup.meherpur.gov.bd

Mahajonpur Union (Bengali: মহাজনপুর ইউনিয়ন) is a union parishad of Mujibnagar Upazila, in Meherpur District, Khulna Division of Bangladesh. The union has an area of 66.54 square kilometres (25.69 sq mi) and as of 2001 had a population of 18,263. There are 6 villages and 5 mouzas in the union. The local economy is predominantly agrarian, with the majority of the population relying on agriculture and crop cultivation as their primary source of livelihood.
