= Buripota Union =

Buripota Union বুড়িপোতা
- Union
- Buripota Union
- Location within Bangladesh
- Coordinates: 23.8168°N 88.6273°E
- Country: Bangladesh
- Division: Khulna
- District: Meherpur
- Upazila: Meherpur Sadar

Area
  - Total: 104.97 km^{2} (40.53 sq mi)

Population (2011)
  - Total: 37,038
  - Density: 352.84/km^{2} (913.86/sq mi)
- Time zone: UTC+6 (BST)
- Website: buripotaup.meherpur.gov.bd

Buripota Union (Bengali: বুড়িপোতা ইউনিয়ন) is a union parishad of Meherpur Sadar Upazila, in Meherpur District, Khulna Division of Bangladesh. The union has an area of 104.97 square kilometres (40.53 sq mi) and as of 2001 had a population of 37,038. There are 17 villages and 22 mouzas in the union.
