= Tentulbaria Union =

Tentulbaria Union তেঁতুলবাড়িয়া ইউনিয়ন
- Union
- Tetulbaria Union
- Location within Bangladesh
- Coordinates: 23.8977°N 88.7251°E
- Country: Bangladesh
- Division: Khulna
- District: Meherpur
- Upazila: Gangni

Area
  - Total: 34.24 km^{2} (13.22 sq mi)

Population (2011)
  - Total: 36,797
  - Density: 1,075/km^{2} (2,783/sq mi)
- Time zone: UTC+6 (BST)
- Website: tentulbaria.meherpur.gov.bd

Tentulbaria Union (Bengali: তেঁতুলবাড়িয়া ইউনিয়ন) is a union parishad situated at Gangni Upazila, in Meherpur District, Khulna Division of Bangladesh. The union has an area of 34.24 square kilometres (13.22 sq mi) and as of 2001 had a population of 36,797. There are 10 villages and 6 mouzas in the union.
