= Pirojpur Union =

Pirojpur Union কুতুবপুর ইউনিয়ন
- Union
- Pirojpur Union
- Location within Bangladesh
- Coordinates: 23.8168°N 88.6273°E
- Country: Bangladesh
- Division: Khulna
- District: Meherpur
- Upazila: Meherpur Sadar

Area
  - Total: 146.23 km^{2} (56.46 sq mi)

Population (2011)
  - Total: 48,175
  - Density: 329.45/km^{2} (853.26/sq mi)
- Time zone: UTC+6 (BST)
- Website: pirojpurup.meherpur.gov.bd

Pirojpur Union (Bengali: কুতুবপুর ইউনিয়ন) is a union parishad situated at Meherpur Sadar Upazila, in Meherpur District, Khulna Division of Bangladesh. The union has an area of 146.23 square kilometres (56.46 sq mi) and as of 2001 had a population of 48,175. There are 23 villages and 14 mouzas in the union.
