= Mohammad Korban Ali =

Bangladeshi politician

- মোহাম্মদ কোরবান আলী

State Minister of Food

Member of Parliament for Kushtia-1
- In office 10 July 1986 – 6 December 1987
- Preceded by: Ahammad Ali
- Succeeded by: Ahsanul Haq Mollah

Personal details
- Born: 14 February 1944
- Died: 2 August 2016 (aged 72) Dhaka, Bangladesh
- Party: Jatiya Party

Mohammad Korban Ali (14 February 1944 – 2 August 2016) was a Jatiya Party (Ershad) politician and a state minister of food. He was a Jatiya Sangsad member of Kushtia-1.

== Career ==
Ali was elected to parliament from Kushtia-1 as a Jatiya Party candidate in 1986 and 1988.
