= Dhankhola Union =

Dhankhola Union ধানখোলা ইউনিয়ন
- Union
- Dhankhola Union
- Location within Bangladesh
- Coordinates: 23.7899°N 88.7672°E
- Country: Bangladesh
- Division: Khulna
- District: Meherpur
- Upazila: Gangni

Area
  - Total: 47.63 km^{2} (18.39 sq mi)

Population (2011)
  - Total: 26,114
  - Density: 548.3/km^{2} (1,420/sq mi)
- Time zone: UTC+6 (BST)
- Website: dhankollaup.meherpur.gov.bd

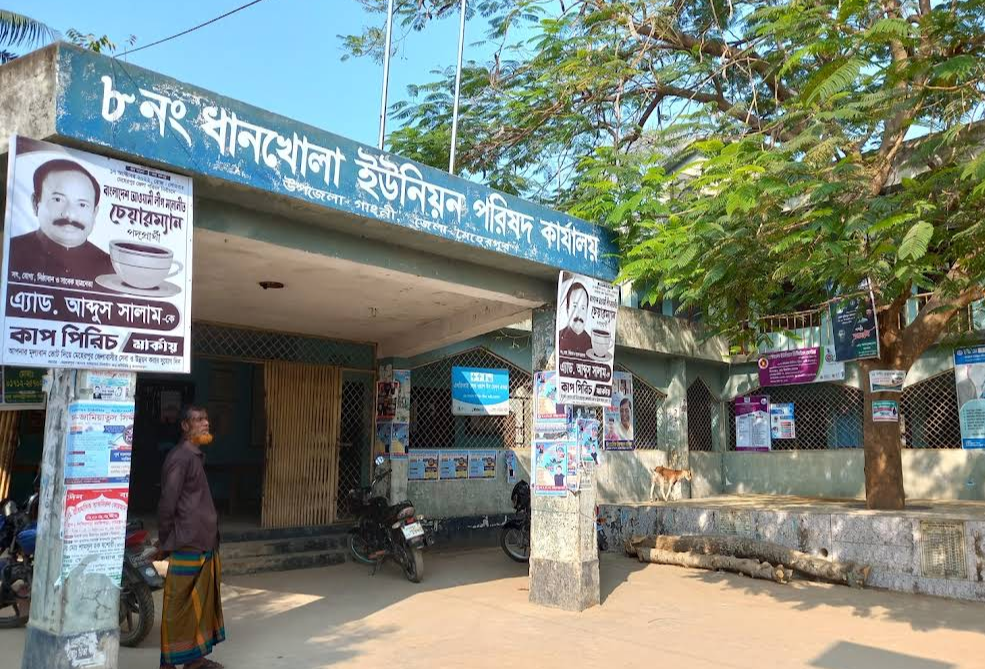
Dhankhola Union Parishad building in Bangladesh

Dhankhola Union (Bengali: ধানখোলা ইউনিয়ন) is a union parishad of Gangni Upazila, in Meherpur District, Khulna Division of Bangladesh. The union has an area of 47.63 square kilometres (18.39 sq mi) and as of 2001 had a population of 26,114. There are 22 villages and 16 mouzas in the union.
