= Kathuli Union =

Kathuli Union কাথুলী ইউনিয়ন
- Union
- Kathuli Union
- Location within Bangladesh
- Coordinates: 23.8567°N 88.6517°E
- Country: Bangladesh
- Division: Khulna
- District: Meherpur
- Upazila: Gangni

Area
  - Total: 86.79 km^{2} (33.51 sq mi)

Population (2011)
  - Total: 23,921
  - Density: 275.6/km^{2} (713.9/sq mi)
- Time zone: UTC+6 (BST)
- Website: kathuli.meherpur.gov.bd

Kathuli Union (Bengali: কাথুলী ইউনিয়ন) is a union parishad situated at Gangni Upazila, in Meherpur District, Khulna Division of Bangladesh. The union has an area of 86.79 square kilometres (33.51 sq mi) and as of 2001 had a population of 23,921. There are 9 villages and 10 mouzas in the union.
