= Kutubpur Union =

Kutubpur Union may refer to:

- Kutubpur Union, Chuadanga Sadar, a union in Chuadanga Sadar Upazila
- Kutubpur Union, Narayanganj Sadar, a union in Narayanganj Sadar Upazila
- Kutubpur Union, Meherpur Sadar, a union in Meherpur Sadar Upazila
