= Ramjan Ali =

Bangladeshi politician

Member of Bangladesh Parliament
- In office 1988–1991
- Preceded by: Mohammad Shahiduddin
- Succeeded by: Abdul Mannan

Personal details
- Party: Jatiya Party (Ershad)

Ramjan Ali is a Jatiya Party (Ershad) politician in Bangladesh and a former member of parliament for Meherpur-1.

== Career ==
Ali was elected to parliament from Meherpur-1 as a Jatiya Party candidate in 1988.
