= AKM Sarwar Jahan Badsha =

Bangladeshi politician

- আ ক ম সরোয়ার জাহান বাদশা

Member of the Bangladesh Parliament for Kushtia-1
- In office 30 January 2019 – 7 January 2024
- Preceded by: Rezaul Haque Chowdhury
- Succeeded by: Rezaul Haque Chowdhury

Personal details
- Party: Awami League
- Education: University of Rajshahi

AKM Sarwar Jahan Badsha is a Bangladeshi politician and former Jatiya Sangsad member representing the Kushtia-1 constituency.

== Early life and education ==
Badsha was born in Kushtia District. He is an ex student of University of Rajshahi.

== Career ==
Badsha was the president of Bangladesh Chhatra League's unit of Rajshahi University. Badsha is elected for the first time in Jatiyo Sangsad from Kushtia-1 constituency as a Bangladesh Awami League candidate.
