= Rezaul Haque Chowdhury =

Bangladeshi politician

- রেজাউল হক চৌধুরী

Member of the Bangladesh Parliament for Kushtia-1
- In office 10 January 2024 – 6 August 2024
- Preceded by: AKM Sarwar Jahan
- Succeeded by: Bachhu Mollah

Personal details
- Born: 16 April 1954 (age 72)
- Party: Bangladesh Awami League

Rezaul Haque Chowdhury (born 16 April 1954) is a Bangladesh Awami League politician and a former Jatiya Sangsad member representing the Kushtia-1 constituency.

== Early life ==
Saeed was born on 16 April 1954. He completed his education up to H.S.C. or grade 12.

== Career ==
Chowdhury was elected to parliament on 5 January 2014 from Kushtia-1 as a Bangladesh Awami League candidate.
