= Kutubpur Union, Meherpur Sadar =

Kutubpur Union কুতুবপুর ইউনিয়ন
- Union
- Kutubpur Union
- Location within Bangladesh
- Coordinates: 23.8168°N 88.6273°E
- Country: Bangladesh
- Division: Khulna
- District: Meherpur
- Upazila: Meherpur Sadar

Area
  - Total: 54.86 km^{2} (21.18 sq mi)

Population (2011)
  - Total: 60,575
  - Density: 1,104/km^{2} (2,860/sq mi)
- Time zone: UTC+6 (BST)
- Website: kutubpurup.meherpur.gov.bd

Kutubpur Union (Bengali: কুতুবপুর ইউনিয়ন) is a union parishad of Meherpur Sadar Upazila, in Meherpur District, Khulna Division of Bangladesh. The union has an area of 54.86 square kilometres (21.18 sq mi) and as of 2001 had a population of 47,575. There are 22 villages Chandpur, Uzalpr, Shubharajpur are one of them and 17 mouzas in the union.Kutubpur Union is a union located in Meherpur district in Bangladesh. With a population of approximately 60,000 people.
