= Ahammad Ali =

Bangladeshi politician

Member of Parliament for Kushtia-1
- In office 1979–1982
- Preceded by: Azizur Rahman Akkas
- Succeeded by: Mohammad Korban Ali

Member of Parliament for Meherpur-1
- In office 1996–1999
- Preceded by: Abdul Mannan
- Succeeded by: Abdul Mannan

Personal details
- Born: 13 February 1935
- Died: 14 April 1999 (aged 63–64)
- Party: Bangladesh Nationalist Party
- Relatives: Masud Arun (son)

Ahammad Ali was a Bangladeshi politician from Meherpur belonging to Bangladesh Nationalist Party. He was elected three times as a member of the Jatiya Sangsad. His son Masud Arun is a former member of the Jatiya Sangsad.

== Biography ==
Ali was elected as a member of the Jatiya Sangsad from Kushtia-1 in 1979. Later, he was elected from Meherpur-1 in the Sixth Jatiya Sangsad Election. He was also elected from this constituency in the Seventh Jatiya Sangsad Election.

Ali died in 1999.
