= Ahsanul Haq Mollah =

Bangladeshi politician

- আহসানুল হক মোল্লা

State Minister of Post and Telecommunication
- In office 10 October 2001 – 23 May 2003

Member of Parliament for Kushtia-1
- In office 5 March 1991 – 12 December 2003
- Preceded by: Mohammad Korban Ali
- Succeeded by: Bachhu Mollah

Personal details
- Died: 12 December 2003 (aged 70) Dhaka, Bangladesh
- Party: Bangladesh Nationalist Party
- Children: Bachhu Mollah

Ahsanul Haq Mollah (known as Pancha Mollah; died 12 December 2003) was a Bangladesh Nationalist Party politician and a four-term Jatiya Sangsad member representing the Kushtia-1 constituency. He served as the state minister of post and telecommunication in the third Khaleda Zia cabinet during 2001–2003.

Suffering from liver cancer, Mollah was taken to Bumrungrad Hospital in Bangkok on 23 November 2003. He was later declared clinically dead and he died after his arrival in Dhaka on the way to Bangabandhu Sheikh Mujib Medical University. His son, Bachhu Mollah, was later elected in a by-election for the vacant position of Jatiya Sangsad membership representing the Kushtia-1 constituency.
