= Postal codes in Bangladesh =

Postal codes in Bangladesh are assigned to all areas in the country. And there is only five General Post Offices in Bangladesh, They are: Central General Post office, Dhaka GPO assigned Code is 1000, Metropolitan General Post office, Metropolitan Dhaka assigned code is 1100, Eastern General Post office Chattogram GPO assigned Code 4000, Northern General Post office, Rajshahi GPO assigned Code 6000 and Southern General Post office, Khulna GPO assigned Code is 9000.

The post code system was introduced in Bangladesh on 22 December 1986.

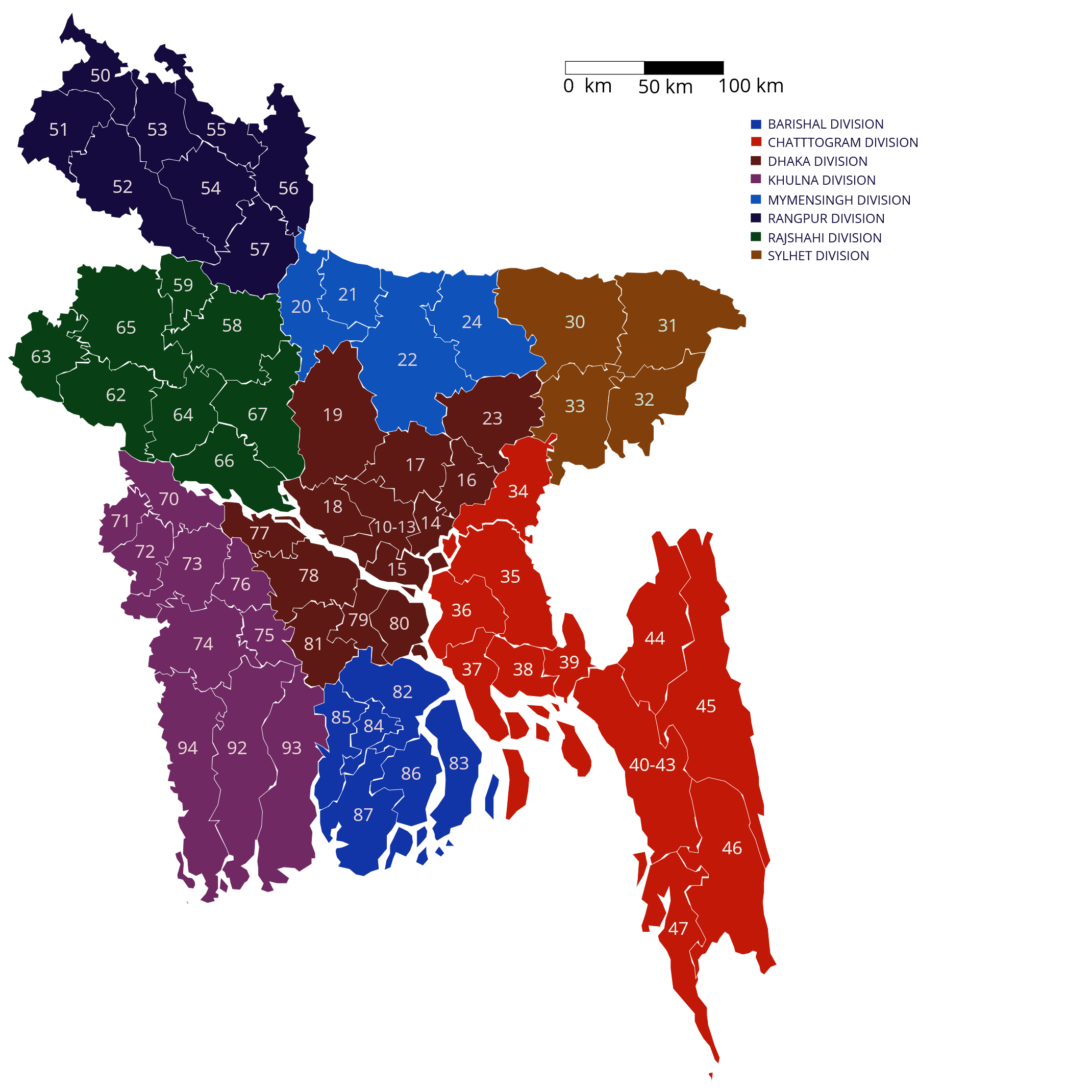
Bangladesh postcode map of the first two digits. Divisions are separated by colour.

== Postal codes ==
=== Central General Post office, Dhaka 1000 & Metropolitan General Post office, Metropolitan Dhaka 1100 ===
==== Dhaka Division ====
- 1000-1399 for Dhaka District
- 1400-1499 for Narayanganj District
- 1500-1599 for Munshiganj District
- 1600-1699 for Narsingdi District
- 1700-1799 for Gazipur District
- 1800-1899 for Manikganj District
- 1900-1999 for Tangail District
- 2300-2399 for Kishoreganj District

==== Mymensingh Division ====
- 2000-2099 for Jamalpur District
- 2100-2199 for Sherpur District
- 2200-2299 for Mymensingh District
- 2400-2499 for Netrokona District

=== Eastern General Post Office, Chattogram 4000 ===
==== Sylhet Division ====
- 3000-3099 for Sunamganj District
- 3100-3199 for Sylhet District
- 3200-3299 for Moulvibazar District
- 3300-3399 for Habiganj District

==== Meghna Division (Proposed) ====
- 3400-3499 for Brahmanbaria District
- 3500-3599 for Cumilla District
- 3600-3699 for Chandpur District
- 3700-3799 for Lakshmipur District
- 3800-3899 for Noakhali District
- 3900-3999 for Feni District

==== Chattogram Division ====
- 4000-4399 for Chattogram District
- 4400-4499 for Khagrachhari District
- 4500-4599 for Rangamati district
- 4600-4699 for Bandarban District
- 4700-4799 for Cox's Bazar District

=== Northern General Post office, Rajshahi 6000 ===
==== Rangpur Division ====
- 5000-5099 for Panchagarh District
- 5100-5199 for Thakurgaon District
- 5200-5299 for Dinajpur District
- 5300-5399 for Nilphamari District
- 5400-5499 for Rangpur District
- 5500-5599 for Lalmonirhat District
- 5600-5699 for Kurigram District
- 5700-5799 for Gaibandha District

==== Rajshahi Division ====
- 5800-5899 for Bogura District
- 5900-5999 for Joypurhat District
- 6000-6299 for Rajshahi District
- 6300-6399 for Chapai Nawabganj District
- 6400-6499 for Natore District
- 6500-6599 for Naogaon District
- 6600-6699 for Pabna District
- 6700-6799 for Sirajganj District

=== Southern General Post office, Khulna 9000 ===
==== Khulna Division ====
- 7000-7099 for Kushtia District
- 7100-7199 for Meherpur District
  - 7100-7109 for Meherpur Sadar Upazila expect 7102.
  - 7102 for Mujibnagar Upazila
  - 7110-7119 for Gangni Upazila
- 7200-7299 for Chuadanga District
- 7300-7399 for Jhenaidah District
- 7400-7499 for Jashore District
  - 7400-7409 for Jashore Sadar Upazila
  - 7410-7419 for Chaugachha Upazila
  - 7420-7429 for Jhikargacha Upazila
  - 7430-7429 for Sharsha Upazila
  - 7440-7449 for Manirampur Upazila
  - 7450-7459 for Keshabpur Upazila
  - 7460-7469 for Abhaynagar Upazila
  - 7470-7479 for Bagharpara Upazila
- 7600-7699 for Magura District
  - 7600-7609 for Magura Sadar Upazila
  - 7610-7619 for Sreepur Upazila
  - 7620-7629 for Mohammadpur Upazila
- 7500-7599 for Narail District
  - 7500-7509 for Narail Sadar Upazila
  - 7510-7419 for Lohagara Upazila
  - 7520-7529 for Kalia Upazila
- 9000-9299 for Khulna District
  - 9000 for Khulna GPO
  - 9100-9199 for Khulna Old Town
  - 9200-9209 for Khulna City
  - 9210-9219 for Phultala Upazila
  - 9220-9229 for Dighalia Upazila
  - 9230-9239 for Terokhada Upazila
  - 9240-9249 for Rupsha Upazila
  - 9250-9259 for Dumuria Upazila
  - 9260-9269 for Batiaghata Upazila
  - 9270-9279 for Dacope Upazila
  - 9280-9289 for Paikgachha Upazila
  - 9290-9299 for Koyra Upazila
- 9300-9399 for Bagerhat District
- 9400-9499 for Satkhira District

==== Padma Division (Proposed) ====
- 7700-7799 for Rajbari District
- 7800-7899 for Faridpur District
- 7900-7999 for Madaripur District
- 8000-8099 for Shariatpur District
- 8100-8199 for Gopalganj District

==== Barishal Division ====
- 8200-8299 for Barishal District
- 8300-8399 for Bhola District
- 8400-8499 for Jhalokati District
- 8500-8599 for Pirojpur District
- 8600-8699 for Patuakhali District
- 8700-8799 for Barguna District
