= Meherpur Government High School =

School in Bangladesh it is best school of meherpur and famous school

Meherpur Govt. High School

Location
- Meherpur Sadar; Bangladesh; 23.7742°N 88.6341°E

Information
- Established: 1854
- School district: Meherpur
- Campus type: Rural
- Sports: Football, cricket, chess, athletics
- Website: www.meherpurghs.edu.bd

Meherpur Government High School is situated in Meherpur, Bangladesh. It was established in 1854, since the British regime in Indian sub-continent. Before the partition of India in 1947, the school was inclusive to a village of Nadia District, named Kathuli. After the plotting of Radcliffe Line, the school was almost to the frontier line of East Bengal. Later, the school was shifted to the present place in 1960 due to the reason, naming Meherpur Multilateral Model High School. After 8 years of the relocation, on 15 November 1968, the school eventually named as Meherpur Govt. High School.

== Administration ==
=== Teachers ===
Currently, 68 teachers have been appointed to proceed the academic curriculum of the school.

=== PTA Committee ===
The PTA committee is formulated to build up the relationship between teachers and guardians for the betterment of the school and the academic procedure.

=== Accountability ===
The school is accountable to the district commissioner's office, directly to the assistant commissioner (education) of the Meherpur district.

== Curriculum ==
It is a typical government operated high school where students are usually admitted in class 3 or class 6 and ends after passing the SSC examination or the secondary school certificate, which is a public examination in Bangladesh. Before passing SSC, the students have to sit for another exam called JSC or junior school certificate.

Passing JSC exam, students choose their concentrations from science, commerce or arts. After passing SSC examination from one of these concentrations, the students finish their high school life and move on for higher secondary schools, or also known as college.

== Facilities ==
Being a government school, the school provides multifarious facility which are following:

- Physics Lab
- Biology Lab
- Chemistry Lab
- Computer Lab
- Library
- Common Room
- Bicycle Stand
- Play Ground

== Scholarship ==
Merit based government provided scholarships are available here.
