= Bagoan Union =

Bagoan Union বাগোয়ান ইউনিয়ন
- Union
- Bagoan Union
- Location within Bangladesh
- Coordinates: 23.6320°N 88.6128°E
- Country: Bangladesh
- Division: Khulna
- District: Meherpur
- Upazila: Meherpur Sadar

Area
  - Total: 48.63 km^{2} (18.78 sq mi)

Population (2011)
  - Total: 29,985
  - Density: 616.6/km^{2} (1,597/sq mi)
- Time zone: UTC+6 (BST)
- Website: bagowanup.meherpur.gov.bd

Bagoan Union (Bengali: বাগোয়ান ইউনিয়ন) is a union parishad of Mujibnagar Upazila, in Meherpur District, Khulna Division of Bangladesh. The union has an area of 48.63 square kilometres (18.78 sq mi) and as of 2001 had a population of 29,985. There are 14 villages and 7 mouzas in the union.
