= Kushtia-1 =

Constituency of Bangladesh's Jatiya Sangsad

Coordinates: 24.00°N 88.88°E

- Constituency for the Jatiya Sangsad
- District: Kushtia District
- Division: Khulna Division
- Electorate: 404,504 (2026)

Current constituency
- Created: 1973
- Party: Bangladesh Nationalist Party
- Member: Bachhu Mollah
- ← 74 Meherpur-2 76 Kushtia-2 →

Kushtia-1 is a constituency represented in the Jatiya Sangsad (National Parliament) of Bangladesh since 2026 by Bachhu Mollah of the Bangladesh Nationalist Party.

== Boundaries ==
The constituency encompasses Daulatpur Upazila.

== History ==
The constituency was created for the first general elections in newly independent Bangladesh, held in 1973.

== Members of Parliament ==
Election	Member	Party
1973	Azizur Rahman Akkas	Awami League
1979	Ahammad Ali	Bangladesh Nationalist Party
Major Boundary Changes
1986	Mohammad Korban Ali	Jatiya Party
1991	Ahsanul Haq Mollah	Bangladesh Nationalist Party
Feb 1996	Ahsanul Haq Mollah	Bangladesh Nationalist Party
2004 by-election	Bachhu Mollah	Bangladesh Nationalist Party
2008	Afaz Uddin Ahmed	Awami League
2014	Rezaul Haque Chowdhury	Independent
2018	AKM Sarwar Jahan	Awami League
2024	Rezaul Haque Chowdhury	Independent
2026	Bachhu Mollah	Bangladesh Nationalist Party

== Elections ==
=== Elections in the 2020s ===
General Election 2026: Kushtia-1
Party	Candidate	Votes	%	±%
BNP	Reza Ahmed Bachchu Mollah	165,909	60.0	N/A
Jamaat	Md. Belal Uddin	86,682	31.3	N/A
Independent	Md. Nuruzzaman	17,864	6.5	N/A
IAB	Md. Aminul Islam	4,063	1.5	N/A
JP(E)	Md. Shahriar Jamil	1,094	0.4	N/A
GOP	Md. Shahabul Islam	613	0.2	N/A
Islamic Front	Mohammad Badiruzzaman	241	0.1	N/A
JSD (Rab)	Md. Gias Uddin	203	0.1	N/A
Majority		79,227	28.0	N/A
Turnout		276,669	68.4	N/A
Jamaat gain from Independent				

=== Elections in the 2010s ===
General Election 2014: Kushtia-1
Party	Candidate	Votes	%	±%
Independent	Rezaul Haque Chowdhury	62,528	54.2	N/A
AL	Afaz Uddin Ahmed	52,909	45.8	−12.4
Majority		9,619	8.3	−8.8
Turnout		115,437	37.7	−53.5
Independent gain from AL				

=== Elections in the 2000s ===
General Election 2008: Kushtia-1
Party	Candidate	Votes	%	±%
AL	Afaz Uddin Ahmed	145,063	58.2	
BNP	Md. Altaf Hosen	102,412	41.1	
IAB	Md. Ruhul Amin	869	0.3	
JSD	Md. Ashraf Siddiquie	649	0.3	
BTF	Md. Hafizur Rahman	323	0.1	
Majority		42,651	17.1	
Turnout		249,316	91.2	
AL gain from BNP				

Ahsanul Haq Mollah died in December 2003. Bachhu Mollah, his son, was elected in a March 2004 by-election.

General Election 2001: Kushtia-1
Party	Candidate	Votes	%	±%
BNP	Ahsanul Haq Mollah	108,326	49.1	+11.0
AL	Afaz Uddin Ahmed	103,491	46.9	+19.2
IJOF	Md. Golam Mostafa	6,056	2.7	N/A
JSD	Md. Rezaul Haq	1,994	0.9	−1.6
WPB	Md. Lutfar Rahman Joarder	598	0.3	N/A
Independent	Md. Kamal Hossain	184	0.1	N/A
Jatiya Party (M)	Md. Moslem Uddin	143	0.1	N/A
Jatiya Janata Party (Hafizur)	Hafizur Rahman Khaja	30	0.0	N/A
Majority		4,835	2.2	−8.2
Turnout		220,822	86.0	−2.7
BNP hold				

=== Elections in the 1990s ===
General Election June 1996: Kushtia-1
Party	Candidate	Votes	%	±%
BNP	Ahsanul Haq Mollah	64,692	38.1	−0.2
AL	Afaz Uddin Ahmed	47,053	27.7	N/A
JP(E)	Korban Ali	36,797	21.7	+4.1
Jatiya Samajtantrik Dal-JSD	Md. Yakub Ali	11,657	6.9	−10.3
Jamaat	Md. Nur Kutubul Alam	4,551	2.7	−2.4
JSD	Kazi Aref Ahmed	4,293	2.5	−3.5
Zaker Party	Md. Kamal Hossain	636	0.4	−1.1
Independent	Md. Matiar Rahman	214	0.1	N/A
Majority		17,639	10.4	−10.3
Turnout		169,893	88.7	+16.3
BNP hold				

General Election 1991: Kushtia-1
Party	Candidate	Votes	%	±%
BNP	Md. Ahsanul Haq Molla	56,807	38.3	
JP(E)	Korban Ali	26,140	17.6	
Jatiya Samajtantrik Dal-JSD	Md. Yakub Ali	25,591	17.2	
BAKSAL	Md. Shamsul Alam Dudu	20,327	13.7	
JSD	Kazi Aref Ahmed	8,919	6.0	
Jamaat	Md. Nur Kutubul Alam	7,589	5.1	
Zaker Party	Md. Zahidul Islam	2,264	1.5	
Jatiya Janata Party (Asad)	Md. Hafizur Rahman Khaza	478	0.3	
FP	Abu Bakar	247	0.2	
Independent	AKM Sarwar Jahan	110	0.1	
Majority		30,667	20.7	
Turnout		148,472	72.4	
BNP gain from JP(E)				
