= Sahiuddin Bishwas =

Bangladeshi politician

Mohammad Sahiuddin Bishwas
- মোহাম্মদ সহিউদ্দিন বিশ্বাস

Member of Parliament for Kushtia-5
- In office 1973–1975

Member of Parliament for Meherpur-1
- In office 1986–1988
- Succeeded by: Ramjan Ali

Personal details
- Born: 1923 Lalbazar, Nadia district, Bengal Presidency
- Died: 21 March 1990 (aged 66–67)
- Party: Bangladesh Awami League
- Children: Farhad Hossain

Mohammad Sahiuddin Bishwas (1923-21 March 1990) was a Bangladesh Awami League politician and a member of parliament for Meherpur-1. He was one of the organizers of the Liberation War of Bangladesh.

== Early life ==
Mohammad Sahiuddin was born on 1923 to a Bengali family of Muslim Biswases in Lalbazar, Tehatta in Nadia district, Bengal Presidency. He was the son of Muhammad Yaqub Biswas and Shamsun Nesa. Biswas passed his matriculation from VJ High School in Chuadanga and got admission in Rajshahi Government College. His son Farhad Hossain is the state minister for public administration and member of parliament from the Meherpur-1 constituency.

== Career ==
Sahiuddin was the founding president of Meherpur Awami League. In 1956 he was elected the first chairman of Meherpur municipality. He was elected member of the national assembly (MNA) as a nominee of the Bangladesh Awami League in the 1970 Pakistan National Assembly elections. He was one of the organizers of the Liberation War of Bangladesh. He served as a member of parliament in the government of Bangladesh during the War of Liberation in 1971. He was the governor of Meherpur in the Bakshal government in 1975.

Sahiuddin was one of the organizers of the Liberation War of Bangladesh. He was elected to parliament from Kushtia-5 as a Bangladesh Awami League candidate in 1973. He was elected to parliament from Meherpur-1 as a Bangladesh Awami League candidate in 1986.

== Death ==
Mohammad Sahiuddin died on 21 March 1990.
