= Manjhaul =

Village in Bihar, India

- Village
- Interactive map of Manjhaul
- Coordinates: 25.557°N 86.128°E
- Country: India
- State: Bihar
- District: Begusarai
- Region: Mithila

Area
  - Village: 9.8 km^{2} (3.8 sq mi)

Population (2011)
  - Total: 35,905
- Demonym: Manjhaulia

Languages
  - Official: Hindi
  - Additional official: Urdu
  - Regional languages: Maithili and Thethi-Maithili
- Time zone: UTC+5:30 (IST)
- PIN: 851127
- Telephone code: +91-6243 or 06243

Manjhaul (also pronounced as Majhaul or Majhauli) is a village in the Begusarai district of Bihar state in India. It is notable for the Jaimangla Gadh Temple and Kaber Lake (Birds Sanctuary).

== Geography ==
Manjhaul is located at 25.557°N 86.128°E. It has an average elevation of 41 metres (135 feet). It has an area of 9.8 km^{2}.

=== Climate ===
The climate of Manjhaul is a monsoon-influenced humid subtropical climate (Köppen Cwa) with high variation between summer and winter in terms of both temperature and rainfall. The temperature varies from 46 °C (115 °F) in summers to around 11 °C (52 °F) in winters. Summers are long, extending from early April to October, with the monsoon season occurring in the middle of the summer. Winter starts in November and peaks in January. The annual mean temperature is around 25 °C (77 °F); monthly daily mean temperatures range from approximately 09 to 34 °C (48 to 93 °F). The average annual rainfall is 1384 mm of which 83% falls between Mid June and & Mid-October. Monsoon normally starts in June and lasts till October. The early monsoon currents, channelled to the NW are the principal source of rainfall of the region. 17% of pre monsoonal rains, which is spread in the different months of the year (specially in the months of November–December–January) have been explained as due to Norwester affect and rest during monsoons due to Himalayan affect. Heavy rains, supplemented by physiographic/geomorphic features lead to heavy flood.

== Demographics ==
As reported by the Census of India 2011 Manjhaul village has population of 35,905 of which 19,021 are males while 16,884 are females. In Manjhaul village population of children with age 0-6 is 5,950 which makes up 17% of total population of town. Average Sex Ratio of Manjhaul village is 888 which is lower than Bihar state average of 918. Child Sex Ratio for the Majhaul as per census is 865, lower than Bihar average of 935. The literacy rate is 61.70%, with 68.39% male literacy and 54.20% female literacy.

== Economy ==
The market in Manjhaul attracts people from more than 10 nearby villages for work and shopping.

== Places of interest ==
=== Kanwar Lake Bird Sanctuary ===
Kanwar Lake Bird Sanctuary or Kabar Taal Lake is Asia's largest freshwater oxbow lake, formed due to meandering of Gandak river, a tributary of Ganga, in the geological past. About 60 migratory birds come from Central Asia in winter and there are around 106 species of resident birds. In 2020, it was declared as a Ramsar site. Internationally noted ornithologist Ali Hussain was born in the village and contributed to the work of the sanctuary.

=== Jaimangla Garh ===
Jaimangla Gadh Temple is located near Kabar Taal Lake, and it has a temple of goddess Chandi Mangla Devi.

=== Neel Kothi ===
The Manjhaul Kothi Indigo Estate, also known as Neel Kothi, is a historic indigo plantation factory located in Manjhaul village. The estate was established in 1836 along the banks of Burhi Gandak River. It served as a major economic and agricultural hub during the colonial period.

== Culture ==
=== Festivals ===
People of Manjhaul celebrate Chhath, Durga Puja, Holi, Diwali, Makar Sankranti, Eid al-Fitr, Muharram and many more festivals.

== Transport ==
=== Railways ===
Begusarai railway station is the nearest railway station. It's 17 km from Manjhaul.

=== Roadways ===
Manjhaul has a bus stand connecting it to big cities like Delhi, Patna, Lucknow, Ranchi, Kolkata.

== Education ==
Manjhaul is home to a number of schools and colleges. R.C.S. College, Manjhaul is one of the oldest colleges of Begusarai District. Government schools are also there in Manjhaul. Middle school Manjhaul, Bazar are one of the famous school.
