= List of regions of Bangladesh by Human Development Index =

This is a list of regions of Bangladesh by Human Development Index as of 2026.

== List of HDI ==
Districts of Bangladesh with Human Development Index for 2023 0.725< 0.700 to 0.724 0.685 to 0.699 0.650 to 0.684 0.650>

Rank	Regions (Districts)	HDI (2023)
High human development
1	Dhaka	0.743
2	Bagerhat, Khulna, Satkhira	0.719
3	Jessore, Magura, Narail	0.704
4	Barishal, Jhalokati, Pirojpur	0.702
5	Gazipur, Narayanganj, Narsingdi	0.701
5	Rajshahi, Naogaon, Nawabganj	0.701
Medium human development
7	Natore, Pabna, Sirajganj	0.696
7	Chittagong	0.696
9	Chuadanga, Jhenaidah, Kushtia, Meherpur	0.694
10	Gopalganj, Madaripur, Munshiganj, Shariatpur	0.687
–	Bangladesh (average)	0.685
11	Faridpur, Manikganj, Rajbari	0.677
11	Jamalpur, Sherpur, Tangail	0.677
13	Barguna, Bhola, Patuakhali	0.675
14	Bogra, Gaibandha, Joypurhat	0.674
15	Kurigram, Lalmonirhat, Rangpur	0.672
15	Brahmanbaria, Chandpur, Cumilla	0.672
17	Dinajpur, Nilphamari, Panchagarh, Thakurgaon	0.670
18	Feni, Lakshmipur, Noakhali	0.661
19	Kishoreganj, Mymensingh, Netrokona	0.660
–	SAARC (average)	0.659
20	Maulvibazar, Sylhet	0.648
21	Habiganj, Sunamganj	0.642
22	Khagrachhari, Rangamati	0.629
23	Bandarban, Cox's Bazar	0.613

== HDI indicators ==
Regions (Districts)	Health index	Educational index	Income index
Dhaka	0.863	0.628	0.757
Bagerhat, Khulna, Satkhira	0.875	0.635	0.670
Jessore, Magura, Narail	0.866	0.599	0.672
Barishal, Jhalokati, Pirojpur	0.846	0.623	0.658
Gazipur, Narayanganj, Narsingdi	0.838	0.578	0.712
Rajshahi, Naogaon, Nawabganj	0.876	0.591	0.666
Natore, Pabna, Sirajganj	0.854	0.590	0.670
Chittagong	0.848	0.569	0.698
Chuadanga, Jhenaidah, Kushtia, Meherpur	0.840	0.586	0.680
Gopalganj, Madaripur, Munshiganj, Shariatpur	0.872	0.547	0.679
Faridpur, Manikganj, Rajbari	0.801	0.573	0.675
Jamalpur, Sherpur, Tangail	0.851	0.556	0.654
Barguna, Bhola, Patuakhali	0.817	0.588	0.641
Bogra, Gaibandha, Joypurhat	0.836	0.560	0.653
Kurigram, Lalmonirhat, Rangpur	0.834	0.577	0.630
Brahmanbaria, Chandpur, Cumilla	0.855	0.520	0.683
Dinajpur, Nilphamari, Panchagarh, Thakurgaon	0.833	0.567	0.636
Feni, Lakshmipur, Noakhali	0.840	0.526	0.654
Kishoreganj, Mymensingh, Netrokona	0.821	0.546	0.640
Maulvibazar, Sylhet	0.774	0.529	0.664
Habiganj, Sunamganj	0.803	0.520	0.634
Khagrachhari, Rangamati	0.836	0.486	0.614
Bandarban, Cox's Bazar	0.855	0.440	0.613

== Historic Trends ==
Bangladesh has shown remarkable progress in human development since 1990. The country's HDI was 0.397 in 1990, increasing to 0.477 in 2000 (20.2% increase), 0.561 in 2010 (17.6% increase), 0.663 in 2020 (18.2% increase), and reached 0.685 as of 2023.

Between 1990 and 2023, Bangladesh's HDI value changed from 0.397 to 0.685, representing a 72.5 percent increase. During this period:

- Life expectancy at birth increased by 18.85 years
- Expected years of schooling increased by 6.77 years
- Mean years of schooling increased by 3.49 years
- Gross National Income (GNI) per capita grew by approximately 390.4 percent
