= Md. Tajuddin Khan =

Bangladeshi politician

Md. Tajuddin Khan is a Bangladeshi politician of the Bangladesh Jamaat-e-Islami, elected in the 2026 general election to represent the Meherpur-1 constituency.
