= Abdul Gani (Meherpur politician) =

Bangladeshi politician

Member of Bangladesh Parliament
- In office 2001–?
- Constituency: Meherpur-2

Personal details
- Party: Bangladesh Nationalist Party

Mohammad Abdul Gani is a Bangladesh Nationalist Party politician and a former member of parliament for Meherpur-2.

== Career ==
Gani was elected to parliament from Meherpur-2 as a Bangladesh Nationalist Party candidate in 2001.
