= Somerset Playne =

British explorer and travel writer

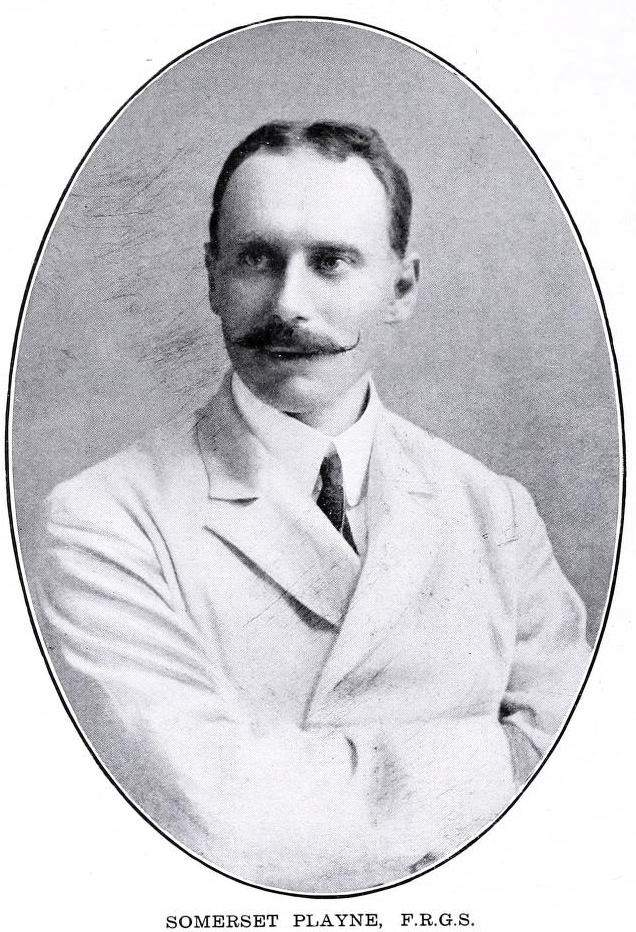
- Born: 8 August 1875
- Died: 10 August 1944 (aged 69)

Signature
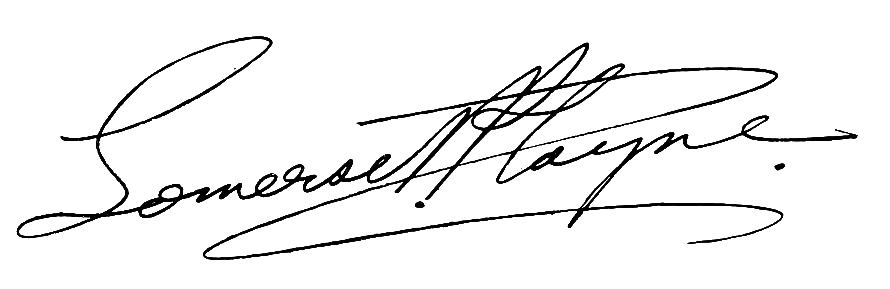

Somerset Playne (1875 – 10 August 1944) was a British explorer and a manager for Lloyd's Greater Britain Publishing Company who travelled the British Empire and wrote books about it.

Playne was born in Mapledurham, Oxfordshire. He studied at Clifton College and St Edward's School, Oxford. He travelled to the United States spending time on ranches and then travelled to South Africa shortly after the Matabele Rebellion. In 1899 he joined an expedition into German East Africa. He worked for Lloyd's Press compiling information on Africa and later, in order to publish his travelogues, Playne started a publishing house "The Foreign and Colonial Compiling and Publishing Company" in 1908. His travels included to British East Africa and wrote a book about it. Later he wrote books about Ceylon, the Federated Malay States, Hong Kong and Shanghai, and visited Java, Labuan, Borneo, and Formosa, Cape Colony, the Orange Free State, and New Zealand between 1908 and 1913.

Playne arrived in India in 1913 and stayed in the Madras Club (now the Express Avenue mall) of Madras. He travelled almost 7,000 miles on motorcycle and produced his travelogue about southern India. Due to World War I he could not return to England. He stayed some more years and wrote books about the Punjab and Bengal. He became a fellow of the Royal Geographical Society and also became a Freemason. He was a member of the Royal Societies and Sports Club.

He bought an estate at Lake Okareka in Rotorua where he died in 1944.

== Works ==
- East Africa (British) its history, people, commerce, industries, and resources (1908)
- Cape Colony (Cape province) its history, commerce, industries, and resources (1910)
- Southern India: Its History, People, Commerce, and Industrial Resources (1914)
- Bengal And Assam, Behar And Orissa: Their History, People, Commerce, And Industrial Resources (1917)
- The Bombay presidency, the United Provinces, the Punjab etc. : their history, people, commerce and natural resources. (1920)
- Indian states : a biographical, historical, and administrative survey (1922)
