= Mohammad Shahiduzzaman =

Bangladeshi politician

Member of Bangladesh Parliament

Personal details
- Party: Bangladesh Awami League

Mohammad Shahiduzzaman (Bengali: মোহাম্মাদ সাহিদুজ্জামান) is a Bangladesh Awami League politician and former member of parliament for Meherpur-2.

== Early life ==
Shahiduzzaman was born on 15 June 1971 and has a Bachelor of Laws degree.

== Career ==
Shahiduzzaman was elected to parliament from Meherpur-2 as a Bangladesh Awami League candidate on 30 December 2018.
