= Md. Mokbul Hossain (Meherpur politician) =

Bangladeshi politician

Member of Parliament

Personal details
- Party: Independent

Md. Mokbul Hossain (Bengali: মোঃ মকবুল হোসেন) is an independent politician and former Member of the Bangladesh Parliament from Meherpur-2.

== Early life ==
Hossain was born on 17 January 1954. He completed his studies up to Higher Secondary School Certificate or grade 12.

Hossain was a prominent freedom fighter, later was the former president of Bangladesh Awami League, Meherpur district.

== Career ==
Hossain was elected to Parliament on 5 January 2014 from Meherpur-2 as an independent candidate. He was involved in a clash with political rivals in 2010.
