= Abdul Mannan (politician, born 1944) =

Bangladeshi politician

- আব্দুল মান্নান

Member of Parliament for Meherpur-1
- In office 1991 – February 1996
- Preceded by: Ramjan Ali
- Succeeded by: Ahammad Ali
- In office May 1999 – 2001
- Preceded by: Ahammad Ali
- Succeeded by: Masud Arun

Personal details
- Born: 23 September 1944 (age 80)
- Political party: Bangladesh Awami League

Abdul Mannan (born 23 September 1944; known as Professor Abdul Mannan) is a Bangladesh Awami League politician and a former Jatiya Sangsad member from the Meherpur-1 constituency during 1991–1996 and again, 1999–2001.
