= Afaz Uddin Ahmed =

Bangladeshi politician (died 2021)

Member of Bangladesh Parliament

Personal details
- Born: 1925 or 1926
- Died: 18 July 2021 (aged 95) Dhaka, Bangladesh
- Party: Bangladesh Awami League

Afaz Uddin Ahmed (born 1925 or 1926, died 18 July 2021) was a Bangladesh Awami League politician and a member of parliament for Kushtia-1.

== Career ==
Ahmed was elected to parliament from Kushtia-1 as a Bangladesh Awami League candidate in 2008 and served till 2014.

Ahmed died from COVID-19 in Dhaka in July 2021, at age 95, during the COVID-19 pandemic in Bangladesh.
