= Kubir Sarkar =

- কুবীর সরকার
- Born: 1787; Madhupur, Brittihuda, Nadia, West Bengal, British India
- Died: 1879; Brittihuda, Nadia, West Bengal,
- Other names: Kubir Goshai
- Occupations: Singer; songwriter
- Musical career
- Genres: Baul, folk
- Instrument(s): Vocal, ektara

Kubir Sarkar also known as Kubir Goshai (Bengali: কুবীর সরকার; Bengali: Falgun 1194 and 11 Ashar 1286) (1787–1879) was a prominent Bengali philosopher, author, Baul saint, mystic, songwriter, social reformer and thinker in Bengal of British India. He was popular as a poet and kaviyal; and alongside he was also known as a famous theorist of Bengal's Secularism. He was a lyricist and composer of songs from the Sahebdhani minor religious sect of Bengal. Some of his notable songs include Dub dub dub rupshagore amar mon/ Tolatol patal khujle pabi re prem rotnodhon.

== Early life ==
Kubir Sarkar was born in 1787 into a weaver family in the village of Madhupur in the district of Nadia, West Bengal. He became a disciple of Guru Charan Pal of the village Brittihuda, in Nadia and that is where he met his demise. Then he became Kubir Goshai.

== Personal life ==
He had numbers of the leading students. Among of them, Jadubindu(Bengali: যাদুবিন্দু) is an important disciple of Kubir Goshai. He was also a famous lyricist and composer of songs from the Sahebdhani minor religious sect of Bengal. Kubir Goshai died in Nadia in 1879(Bengali: 11 Ashar 1286).

== Works and legacy ==
Kubir Goshai’s philosophy was mainly based on the Vaisnava Sahajiya .According to Sahajiya philosophy, along with an external form; every object also has an internal form. On his birth anniversary, his followers and students have preserved his diary full of songs beside his tomb. Kubir Goshai composed over 1,203 songs.

=== Most popular songs ===
- Dub dub dub rupshagore amar mon/ Tolatol patal khujle pabi re prem rotnodhon
- Ore brindabon hote bro shripat huda gram/ jotha dibinishi shuni dinbondu nam.
- Lakhi ar Durga Kali, Fatema tari boli,/ jar purto hosen ali madinay kore khela.
- Allah aljibayi ache / khrisno thake takrate.
- Age chilam jalamoy panir upor khaki roy/khair upor ghorbari sokoler.
- Vaire hindu mole ganga pai jobon thake jaminay/ shatmote bli shono postore.
- Manuser keon kro / ebar sadhan bole bhaktir jore manus dhro.

== See also ==
- Music of Bengal
