= Joynal Abeden (politician) =

Bangladeshi politician

Member of Bangladesh Parliament

Personal details
- Born: 27 September 1970
- Party: Bangladesh Awami League

Joynal Abeden is a Bangladesh Awami League politician and a former member of parliament for Meherpur-1.

== Career ==
Abeden was elected to parliament from Meherpur-1 as a Bangladesh Awami League candidate in 2008.
