= Meherpur =

Meherpur মেহেরপুর
- Town and Municipality
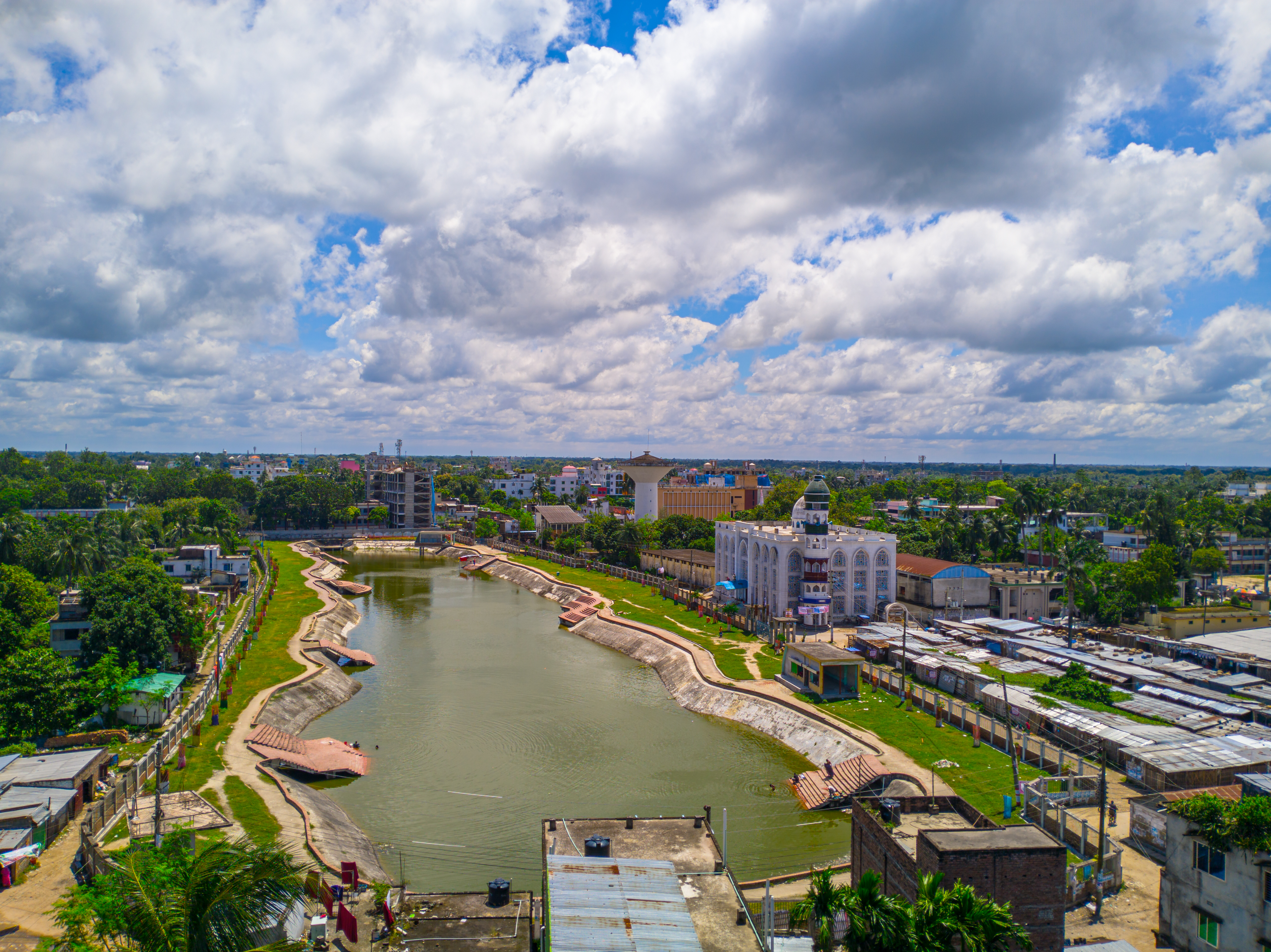

- Location in Bangladesh Meherpur (Bangladesh)
- Coordinates: 23.775°N 88.631°E
- Country: Bangladesh
- Division: Khulna
- District: Meherpur
- Upazila: Meherpur Sadar

Government
  - Type: Municipality
  - Body: Meherpur Paurashava

Population (2022)
  - Total: 47,133
- Time zone: UTC+6 (BST)

Meherpur is a city and municipality in western Bangladesh. It is the headquarters of Meherpur District.

== Demographics ==
Religions in Meherpur (2011)
Religion	Percent
Islam	94.73%
Hinduism	5.04%
Other or not stated	0.22%

According to the 2022 Bangladesh census, Meherpur city had a population of 47,133 and a literacy rate of 85.15%.

According to the 2011 Bangladesh census, Meherpur city had 10,418 households and a population of 43,133. 7,393 (17.14%) were under 10 years of age. Meherpur had a literacy rate (age 7 and over) of 66.32%, compared to the national average of 51.8%, and a sex ratio of 980 females per 1000 males.
