= Mujibnagar Upazila =

Mujibnagar মুজিবনগর Bhoborpara Baidyanathtala
- Upazila
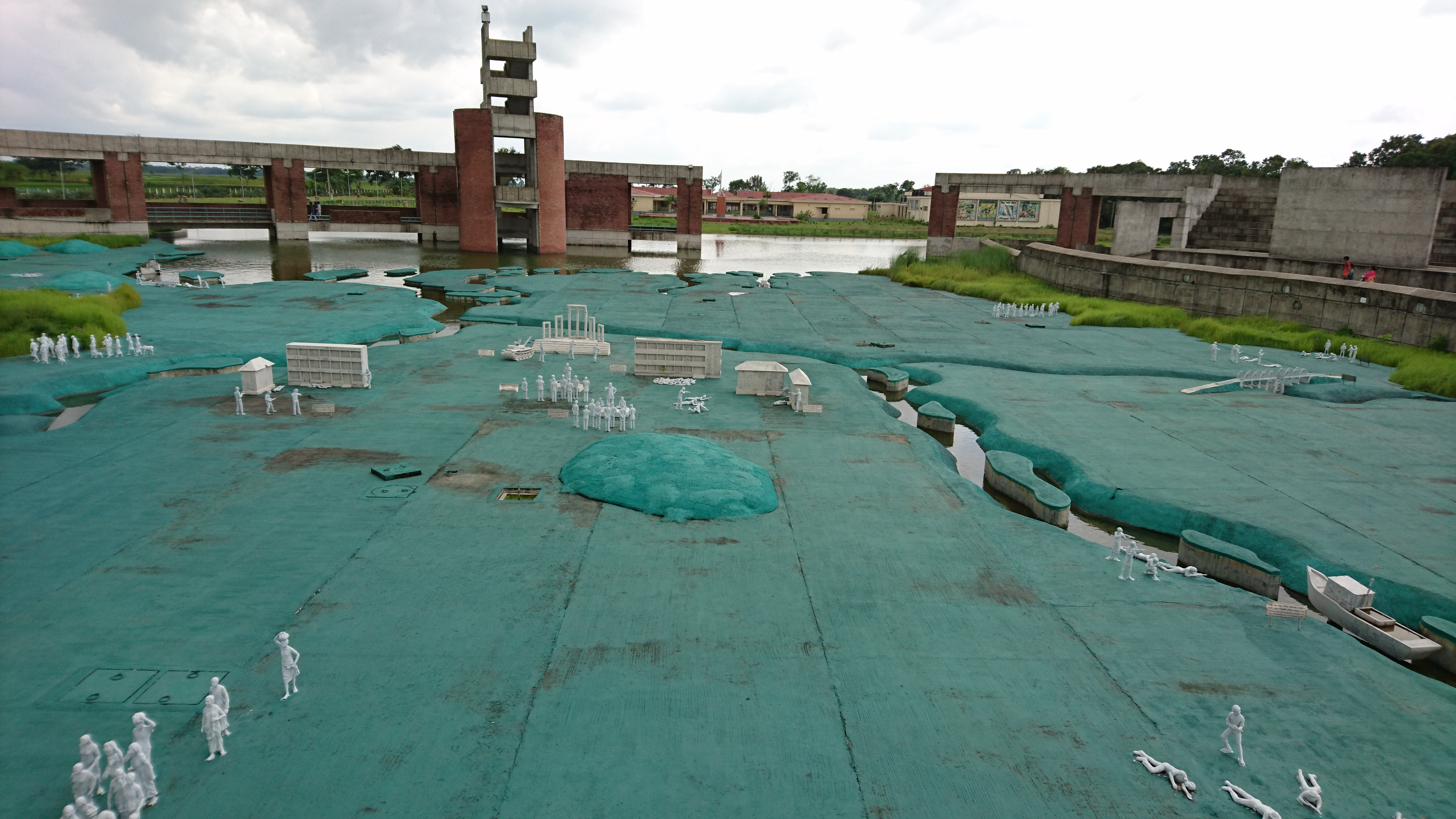
- Mujibnagar Muktijuddho Smriti Complex

- Coordinates: 23°39′N 88°36′E
- Country: Bangladesh
- Division: Khulna
- District: Meherpur

Area
  - Total: 112.68 km^{2} (43.51 sq mi)

Population (2022)
  - Total: 105,752
  - Density: 938.52/km^{2} (2,430.7/sq mi)
- Time zone: UTC+6 (BST)
- Postal code: 7102
- Area code: 07923
- Website: mujibnagar.gov.bd

Mujibnagar (Bengali: মুজিবনগর) is an upazila (subdistrict) of Meherpur District in Bangladesh.

== History ==
Mujibnagar was formerly a part of the Meherpur Sadar Upazila, before it was made a separate Upazila on 22 February 2000. The name Mujibnagar commemorates an event in the history of Bangladesh: It is the place where, on 17 April 1971, the first government of the People's Republic of Bangladesh was sworn in, and the place was named Mujibnagar after Sheikh Mujibur Rahman.

== Geography ==
Mujibnagar Upazila is bounded by Meherpur Sadar Upazila in Meherpur District, on the north, Meherpur Sadar Upazila and Damurhuda Upazila, the latter in Chuadanga District, on the east, and Tehatta I CD Block, in Nadia District, West Bengal, India, on the south and the west.

== Demographics ==
Historical population
Year	Pop. (000)	±%
1981	NA	—
1991	75,455	—
2001	89,886	+19.1%
2011	99,143	+10.3%
2022	105,752	+6.7%
Source: Bangladesh Bureau of Statistics

Religions in Mujibnagar Upazila (2022)
Religion	Percent
Islam	94.31%
Christianity	4.73%
Hinduism	0.95%
Other or not stated	0.01%

According to the 2022 Bangladeshi census, Mujibnagar Upazila had 27,675 households and a population of 105,752. 6.93% of the population were under 5 years of age. Mujibnagar had a literacy rate (age 7 and over) of 69.75%: 69.80% for males and 69.70% for females, and a sex ratio of 94.51 males for every 100 females. 34,122 (32.27%) lived in urban areas.

== Administration ==
Mujibnagar Upazila is divided into four union parishads: Bagoan, Dariapur, Mahajanpur, and Monakhali. The union parishads are subdivided into 29 mauzas and 33 villages.
