= Meherpur Sadar Upazila =

Upazila in Khulna, Bangladesh and HQ of Meherpur District

Meherpur Sadar মেহেরপুর সদর
- Upazila
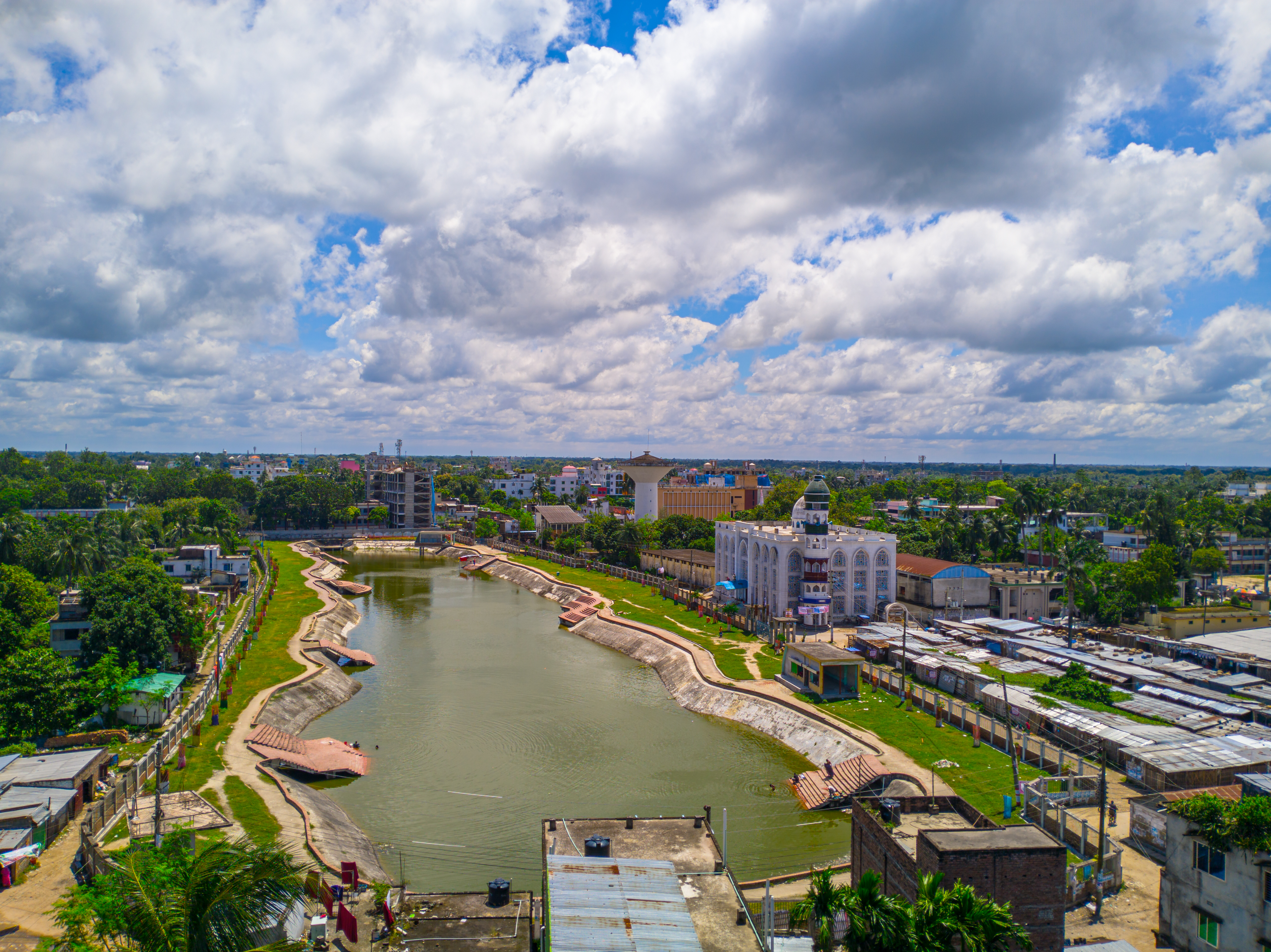
- Park in Meherpur city

- Coordinates: 23°46.5′N 88°38.5′E
- Country: Bangladesh
- Division: Khulna
- District: Meherpur
- Headquarters: Meherpur

Area
  - Total: 261.42 km^{2} (100.93 sq mi)

Population (2022)
  - Total: 276,903
  - Density: 1,059.2/km^{2} (2,743.4/sq mi)
- Time zone: UTC+6 (BST)
- Postal code: 7100
- Area code: 0791
- Website: Official Map of Meherpur Sadar

Meherpur Sadar Upazila (Bengali: মেহেরপুর সদর উপজেলা) is an upazila of Meherpur District in Khulna Division, Bangladesh.

Meherpur Sadar Upazila mauza geocode map

== History ==
Bangladesh's Proclamation of Independence was solemnly made at the village Baidyanathtola (now Mujibnagar), on 17 April 1971 of this district. The first provisional government of Bangladesh began here under the leadership of Tajuddin Ahmed. After that day on 18 April 1971, the Pakistan army killed 8 individuals in Amjhupi village.

== Geography ==
Meherpur Sadar is located at 23.7750°N 88.6417°E. It has 64,130 households and total area 261.42 km^{2}.

Meherpur Sadar Upazila is bounded by Gangni Upazila and Tehatta I CD Block, in Nadia District, West Bengal, India, on the north, Gangni Upazila and Alamdanga Upazila, the latter in Chuadanga District, on the east, Damurhuda Upazila and Mujibnagar Upazila in Chuadanga District, on the south and Tehatta I CD Block in Nadia district, on the west.

=== Main rivers ===
The main rivers are Bhairab, Mathabhaga and Kazli.

== Demographics ==
Historical population
Year	Pop.	±%
1991	187,324	—
2001	232,465	+24.1%
2011	256,642	+10.4%
2022	276,903	+7.9%
Source: Bangladesh Bureau of Statistics

Religions in Meherpur Sadar Upazila (2022)
Religion	Percent
Islam	99.36%
Hinduism	0.59%
Other or not stated	0.05%

According to the 2022 Bangladeshi census, Meherpur Sadar Upazila had 74,879 households and a population of 276,903. 7.32% of the population were under 5 years of age. Meherpur Sadar had a literacy rate (age 7 and over) of 70.63%: 71.88% for males and 69.48% for females, and a sex ratio of 94.09 males for every 100 females. 58,943 (21.29%) lived in urban areas.

== Administration ==
Meherpur Sadar Upazila is divided into Meherpur Municipality and five union parishads: Amdah, Amjhupi, Buripota, Kutubpur, and Pirojpur. The union parishads are subdivided into 61 mauzas and 104 villages.

Meherpur Municipality is subdivided into 9 wards and 72 mahallas.

== See also ==
- Upazilas of Bangladesh
- Districts of Bangladesh
- Divisions of Bangladesh
- Administrative geography of Bangladesh
