= Gangni Upazila =

Gangni গাংনী
- Upazila
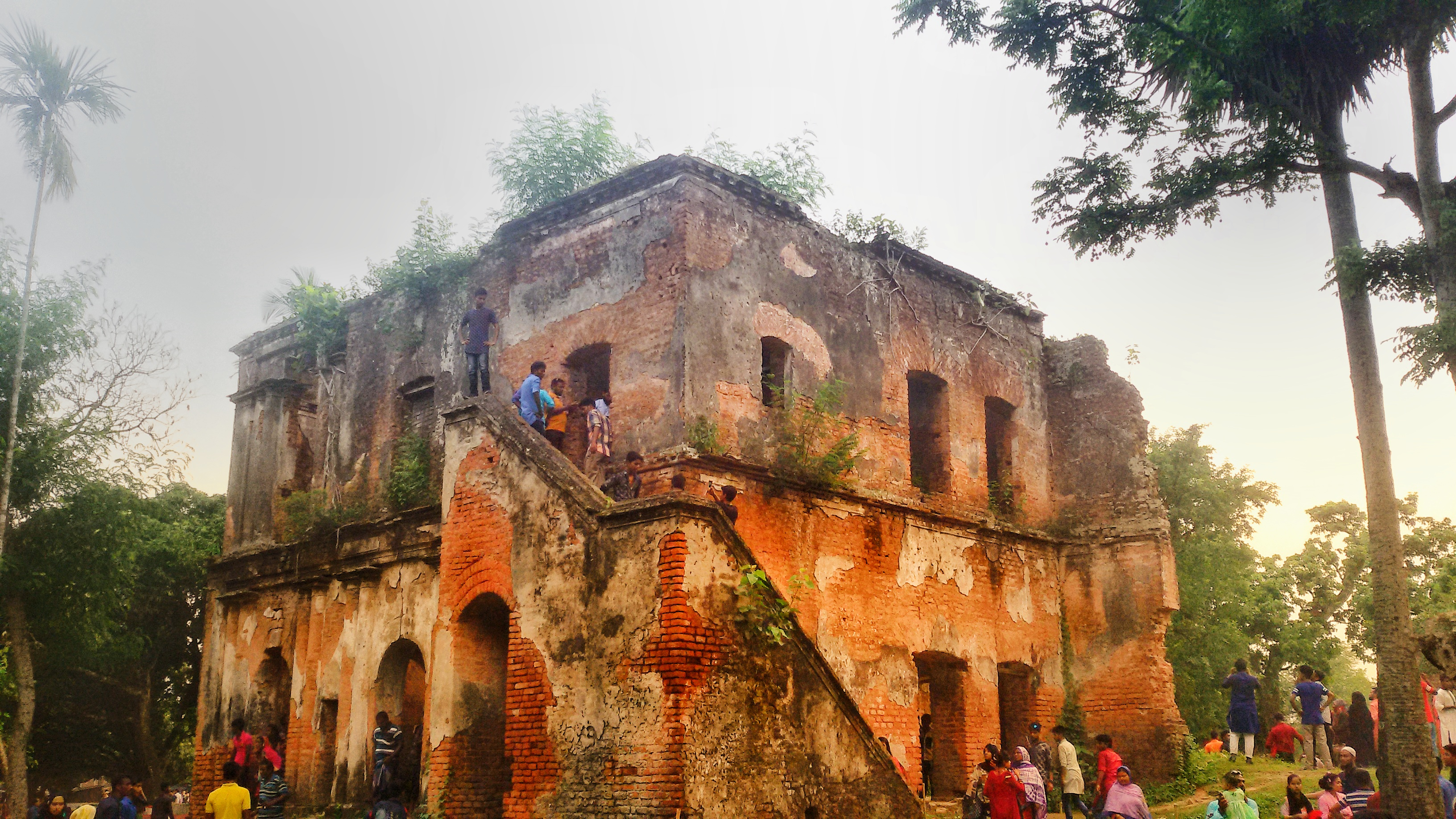
- Bhatpara Neelkuthi

- Coordinates: 23°49′N 88°45.3′E
- Country: Bangladesh
- Division: Khulna
- District: Meherpur

Area
  - Total: 341.98 km^{2} (132.04 sq mi)

Population (2022)
  - Total: 322,701
  - Density: 943.63/km^{2} (2,444.0/sq mi)
- Time zone: UTC+6 (BST)
- Postal code: 7110
- Website: gangni.meherpur.gov.bd

Gangni Upazila mauza geocode map

Gangni (Bengali: গাংনী) is an upazila of Meherpur District in Khulna Division, Bangladesh.

== Geography ==
It has 77,580 households and total area 341.98 km^{2}.

Main rivers are Bhairab, Kazla. Dharla and Ilangi Beels are notable. Gangni (town) consists of 5 mouzas. It has a population of 19126; male 51.48% and female 48.95%. Literacy rate among the town people is 28.8%. Administration Gangni thana, now an upazila, was established in 1923. It consists of 9 union parishads, 100 mouzas, 136 village, 5 border outpost.

Gangni Upazila is bounded by Daulatpur Upazila in Kushtia District, on the north, Daulatpur, Mirpur Upazilas in Kushtia District, and Alamdanga Upazila in Chuadanga District on the east, Alamdanga Upazila in Chuadanga District and Meherpur Sadar Upazila on the south and Karimpur II and Tehatta I CD Blocks, in Nadia District, West Bengal, India, on the west.

== Demographics ==
Historical population
Year	Pop.	±%
1981	186,498	—
1991	229,138	+22.9%
2001	269,085	+17.4%
2011	299,607	+11.3%
2022	322,701	+7.7%
Source: Bangladesh Bureau of Statistics

Religions in Gangni Upazila (2022)
Religion	Percent
Islam	98.62%
Hinduism	0.95%
Christianity	0.42%
Other or not stated	0.01%

According to the 2022 Bangladeshi census, Gangni Upazila had 92,768 households and a population of 322,701. 7.72% of the population were under 5 years of age. Gangni had a literacy rate (age 7 and over) of 65.46%: 66.02% for males and 64.95% for females, and a sex ratio of 91.84 males for every 100 females. 65,820 (20.40%) lived in urban areas.

== Arts and culture ==
Public library 4, rural club 10, playground 20. Main occupations Agriculture 38.19%, agricultural labourer 33.75%, wage labourer 4.43%, commerce 12.48%, construction 1%, service 2.7%, others 7.45%.Land use Cultivable land 26.545 hectare; fallow land 38 hectare; single crop 13.4%, double crop 67.5%, triple crop 19.2%; land under irrigation 54%.Land control Among the peasants, 14.29% are rich, 50.79% intermediate and 34.92% small; cultivable land per head 0.15 hectare.,

Football is a popular sports for the people in the upazila, young generation is attracted by the cricket. Men wear Lungi whether women prefer Sari.

== Points of interest ==
- Shaharbati Neelkuthi (1859)
- Gosaidubi Mosque at Karamdi
- Marks of War of Liberation: Mass grave 2 (Kazipur and Tepukhali playground)
- There is a hundred of ponds at the village Sholotaka where fish is cultivated commercially

== Administration ==
Gangni Upazila is divided into Gangni Municipality and nine union parishads: Bamondi, Dhankolla, Kathuli, Kazipur, Motmura, Raipur, Shaharbati, Sholotaka, and Tentulbaria. The union parishads are subdivided into 90 mauzas and 137 villages.

Gangni Municipality is subdivided into 9 wards and 29 mahallas.

== Education ==
Old educational institutions are Hoglabaria High School and Gangni High School that produces dozens of doctors and engineers.

== See also ==
- Upazilas of Bangladesh
- Districts of Bangladesh
- Divisions of Bangladesh
- Administrative geography of Bangladesh
