= Meherpur District =

District of Bangladesh in Khulna Division Meherpur

Meherpur District মেহেরপুর জেলা
- District of Bangladesh
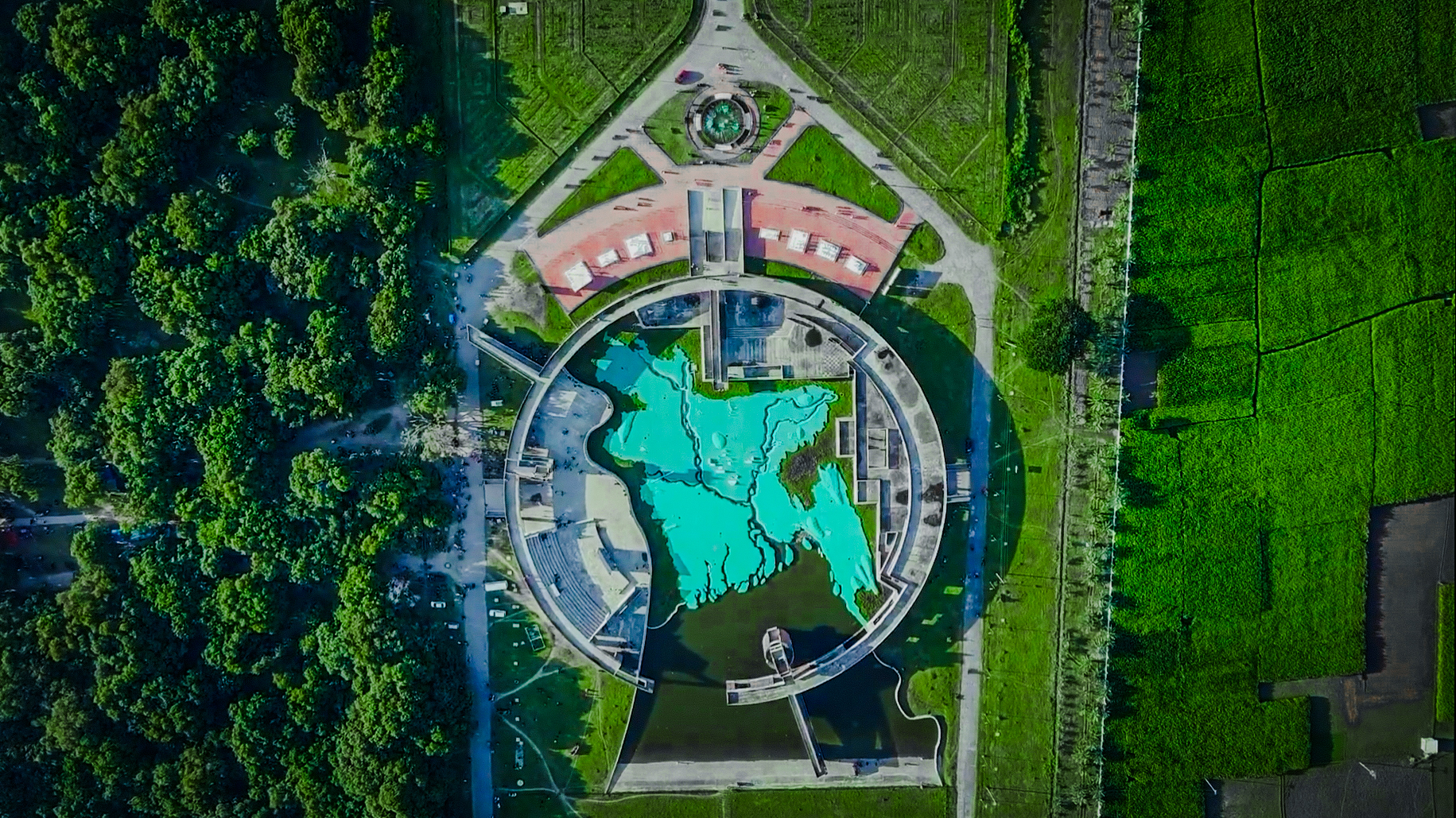
- Image of Mujibnagar Memorial

- Location of Meherpur District in Bangladesh
- Interactive map of Meherpur District
- Coordinates: 23.75°N 88.70°E
- Country: Bangladesh
- Division: Khulna
- Headquarters: Meherpur

Government
  - Deputy Commissioner: Syed Enamul Kabir

Area (2022)
  - Total: 741.62 km^{2} (286.34 sq mi)

Population (2022)
  - Total: 705,356
  - Density: 951.10/km^{2} (2,463.3/sq mi)
- Demonym: Meherpuri
- Time zone: UTC+06:00 (BST)
- Postal code: 7100
- Area code: 0791
- ISO 3166 code: BD-39
- HDI (2019): 0.644 medium · 5th of 20
- Website: meherpur.gov.bd

Meherpur District upazila geocode map

Meherpur District (Bengali: মেহেরপুর জেলা) is a northwestern district of Khulna Division in southwestern Bangladesh. It is bordered by West Bengal, India in the west, and by the Bangladeshi districts of Kushtia and Chuadanga to the east. Pre-independence Meherpur was a subdivision of Nadia district including (Karimpur and Tehatta thana). The district has an area of 716.08 square kilometres (276.48 sq mi).

== History ==
According to the district website, the district is conjecturally named after the 16th century dervish Meher Ali Shah.

The Provisional Government of Bangladesh was formed and solemnly sworn in Meherpur's Baidyanathtala village (later renamed as Mujibnagar), on 17 April 1971 under the leadership of Tajuddin Ahmed and Syed Nazrul Islam. The entire proclamation ceremony was organised by local leaders under the supervision of Momeen Chowdhury and MM Rustom Ali. Meherpur became a district in 1983 under CMLA Hussain Muhammad Ershad's decentralization programme.

== Demographics ==
Historical population
Year	Pop.	±% p.a.
1974	325,314	—
1981	401,727	+3.06%
1991	491,917	+2.05%
2001	591,436	+1.86%
2011	655,392	+1.03%
2022	705,356	+0.67%

According to the 2022 Census of Bangladesh, Meherpur District had 195,322 households and a population of 705,356 with an average 3.59 people per household. Among the population, 104,284 (14.78%) inhabitants were under 10 years of age. The population density was 951 people per km^{2}. Meherpur District had a literacy rate (age 7 and over) of 68.14%, compared to the national average of 74.80%, and a sex ratio of 1074 females per 1000 males. Approximately, 22.53% of the population lived in urban areas. The ethnic population was 161.

Religions in Meherpur District (2022)
Religion	Percent
Islam	97.87%
Hinduism	1.20%
Christianity	0.92%
Other or not stated	0.01%

Religion in present-day Meherpur District
Religion	1941 (Note: Meherpur and Gangani thanas of Nadia district)		1981		1991		2001		2011		2022	
Religion	Pop.	%	Pop.	%	Pop.	%	Pop.	%	Pop.	%	Pop.	%
Islam	109,443	70.94%	389,094	96.86%	479,654	97.51%	576,962	97.55%	640,751	97.77%	690,349	97.87%
Hinduism	41,487	26.89%	6,569	1.64%	6,299	1.28%	6,779	1.15%	7,870	1.20%	8,497	1.20%
Christianity	3,104	2.01%	5,857	1.46%	5,802	1.18%	7,389	1.25%	6,627	1.01%	6,478	0.92%
Others (Note: Including Jainism, Christianity, Buddhism, Zoroastrianism, Judaism, Ad-Dharmis, or not stated)	240	0.16%	207	0.04%	162	0.03%	306	0.05%	144	0.02%	32	0.01%
Total Population	154,274	100%	401,727	100%	491,917	100%	591,436	100%	655,392	100%	705,356	100%

In 2022, Muslims formed 97.87% of the population, Hindus 1.20%, and Christians 0.92%. Other religions were 0.01%.

== Upazilas ==
- Meherpur Sadar Upazila
- Mujibnagar Upazila
- Gangni Upazila

== Economy ==
Main sources of income: Agriculture 68.95%, non-agricultural labourer 3.24%, industry 0.87%, commerce 13.83%, transport and communication 2.21%, service 3.81%, construction 1.03%, religious service 0.14%, rent and remittance 0.59% and others 5.33%.

== See also ==
- Mujibnagar Upazila
- Upazilas of Bangladesh
- Districts of Bangladesh
- Divisions of Bangladesh
- Upazila
- Thana
- Administrative geography of Bangladesh
