= PNS Zulfiqar (K265) =

River-class frigate of the Pakistan Navy

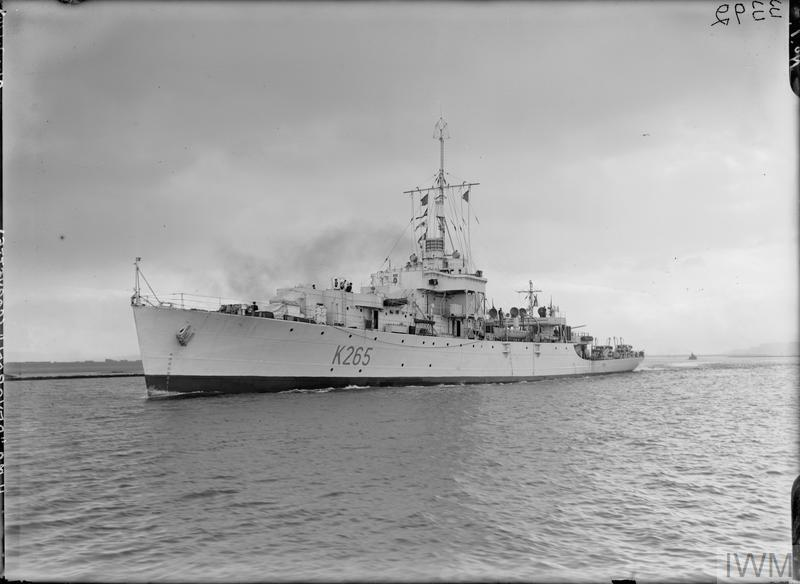

History

United Kingdom
- Name: HMS Deveron
- Builder: Smith's Dock Co Ltd
- Laid down: 16 April 1942
- Launched: 12 October 1942
- Commissioned: 2 March 1943
- Identification: Pennant number: K265
- Fate: Transferred to India as HMIS Dhanush in 1945

India
- Name: HMIS Dhanush
- Commissioned: 1945
- Decommissioned: 1947
- Fate: Transferred to Pakistan as PNS Dhanush

Pakistan
- Name: PNS Zulfiqar
- Namesake: Sword
- Builder: Smiths Dock Co. in South Bank in England
- Laid down: 16 April 1942
- Launched: 12 October 1942
- Identification: Pennant number: F-265 changed to F-262 in 1963
- Fate: Damaged beyond repair December 1971. Scrapped in 1983

General characteristics
- Class & type: River-class frigate
- Displacement: 1375 tons (standard); 2100 tons (full load)
- Length: 91.9 m (301 ft 6 in)
- Beam: 11.2 metres (37 ft)
- Draught: 3.8 metres (12 ft)
- Propulsion: 2 × Admiralty 3-drum boilers, 2 shafts, reciprocating vertical triple expansion, 5,500 ihp (4,100 kW)
- Speed: 20 kn (37 km/h) maximum
- Range: 6,000 nmi (11,000 km)
- Complement: 150, 20 officers, 130 enlists
- Armament: Guns: 1 × 4in Mk.; 2 × Bofors 40 mm

PNS Zulfiqar was a River-class frigate of the Pakistan Navy, originally built for the Royal Navy during the Second World War as HMS Deveron. Zulfiqar was damaged beyond repair by friendly fire from aircraft of the Pakistan Air Force (PAF) which mistook her for a missile boat of the Indian Navy during the Indo-Pakistani War of 1971.

== History ==
Following service in the Second World War, Deveron was transferred to the Royal Indian Navy in 1945 and was renamed HMIS Dhanush. On Partition she was transferred to the Royal Pakistan Navy, converted into a survey vessel, and renamed Zulfiqar. The conversion meant the rear 4-inch gun was removed. Her pennant number was changed from F265 to 262 in 1963.

In June 1953 she attended the Coronation Review of Queen Elizabeth II at Spithead.

She was decommissioned in 1983.

== Operation Trident ==
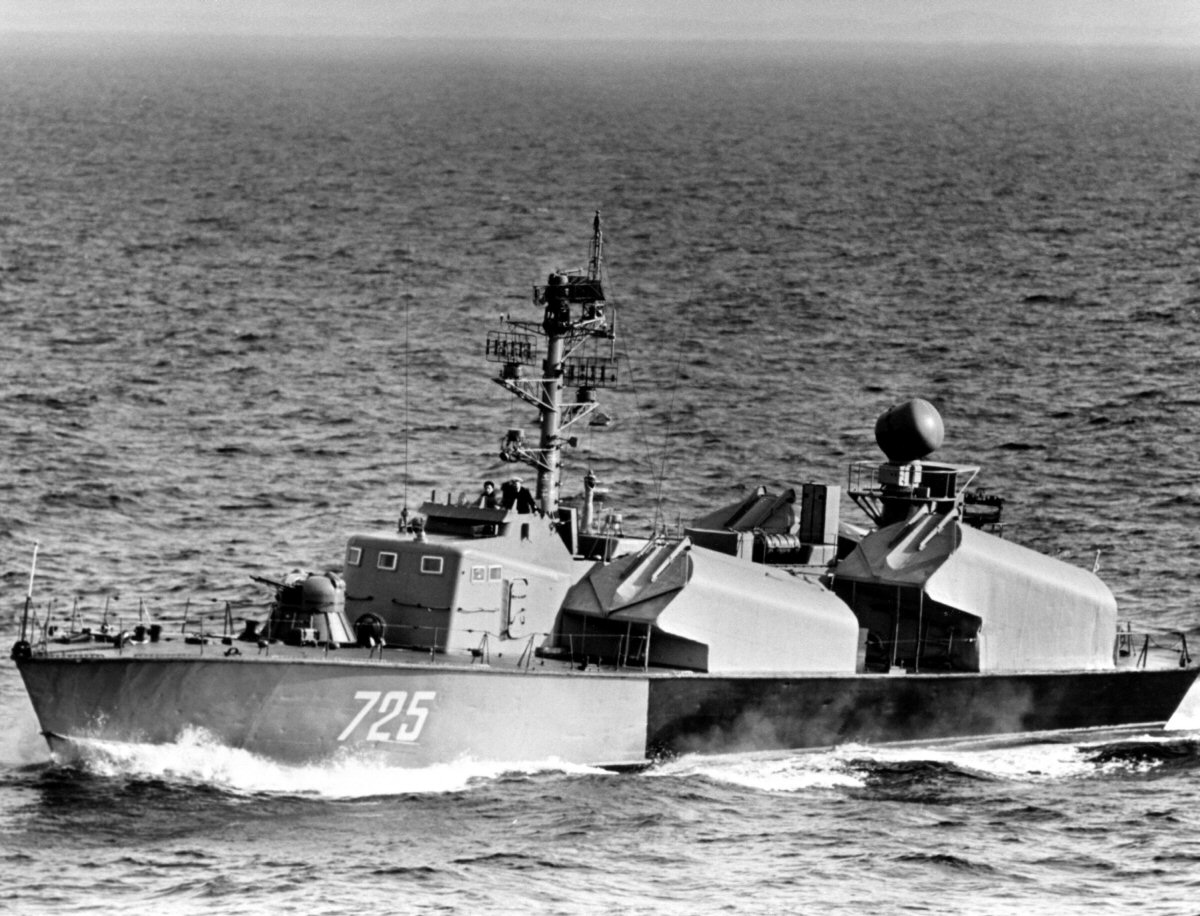
Osa missile boat

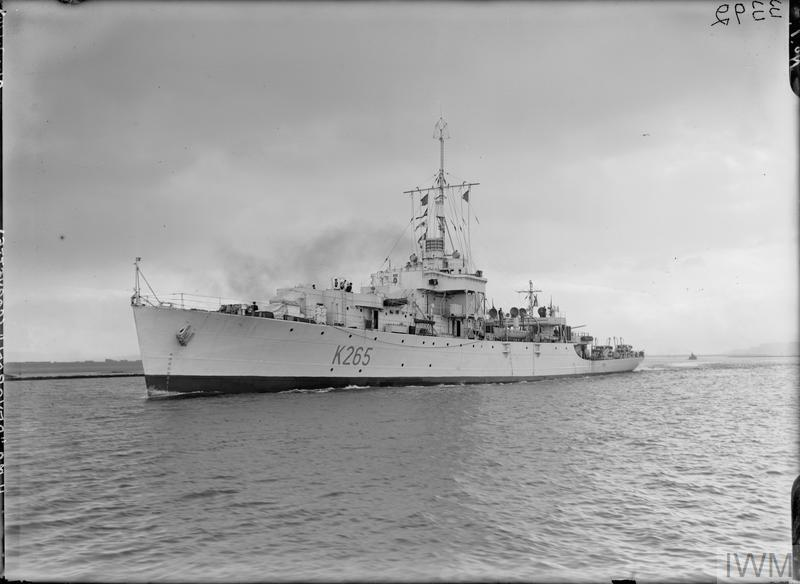
Zulfiqar (K265)

The Osa-I class missile boat (left) and Zulfiqar (K265) (right). Pakistani naval observers failed to identify their own larger ship despite difference in sizes that led to a serious incident of friendly fire by the Pakistan Air Force.

The Pakistan Navy, on high alert as a result of the first missile attack (Ops: Trident), raised a number of false alarms in the ensuing days about the presence of Indian Navy vessels off Karachi. One such false alarm was raised by a PIA Fokker Friendship reconnaissance aircraft carrying naval observers, in the early hours of 6 December 1971 which reported a Pakistan Navy frigate as a missile boat of the Indian Navy, in the area west of Cape Monze on the Pakistani coast.

The Pakistan Air Force, giving air support to the Pakistan Navy at Karachi, had received the report. Clearance was given to attack by Cdre. A. W. Bhombal from the Pakistan Navy.

At 0645 hrs, the F-86 jets were scrambled which strafed the vessel before it was identified as the Pakistan Navy's own frigate Zulfiqar. During the aerial attack Zulfiqar was hit by more than 900 rounds of .50 caliber ammunition, killing and injuring several officers and men. The air attack on Zulfiqar was halted after frantic efforts by her crew to identify their ship as a Pakistan Navy vessel finally succeeded.

The incident was monitored on radio by the Indian Navy and reportedly concluded that PAF pilots could not clearly distinguish a frigate from a missile boat and that the Pakistan Navy had been wary of India's missile boats.

This incident vindicated the decision to proceed with second missile attacks (Ops: Python), which was being debated after a PAF attack on Okha on the night of 5/6 December 1971. It also prompted the Pakistan Navy to move the Pakistan combat fleet closer to Pakistan's shore.

The shelling of Zulfiqar was a matter of interservice conflict between the Navy and the Air Force, in which the Air Force alleged the Navy was disregarding the "sense of camaraderie". Responding to this incident, the PAF contested the claims made by the Indian Navy by holding Cdre. Bhombal responsible for giving the clearance when the Air Force's Board of Inquiry reportedly quoted: "[the] Navy unfortunately seems to have forgotten the sense of camaraderie and air support which was provided from the scarce resources with readiness."

== See also ==
- PNS Muhafiz
- INS Khukri
- Indo-Pakistani War of 1971
- Timeline of the Bangladesh Liberation War
- Military plans of the Bangladesh Liberation War
- Mitro Bahini order of battle
- Pakistan Army order of battle, December 1971
- Evolution of Pakistan Eastern Command plan
- Operation Searchlight
- Indo-Pakistani wars and conflicts
- Military history of India
- List of military disasters
- List of wars involving India

== Publications ==
- Colledge, J. J.; Warlow, Ben (2006) [1969]. Ships of the Royal Navy: The Complete Record of All Fighting Ships of the Royal Navy from the 15th Century to the Present (3rd Rev ed.). London: Chatham Publishing. ISBN 978-1-86176-281-8. OCLC 67375475.
