= Tangail Airdrop =

1971 battle of the Bangladesh Liberation War

- Part of the Bangladesh Liberation War and the Indo-Pakistani War of 1971
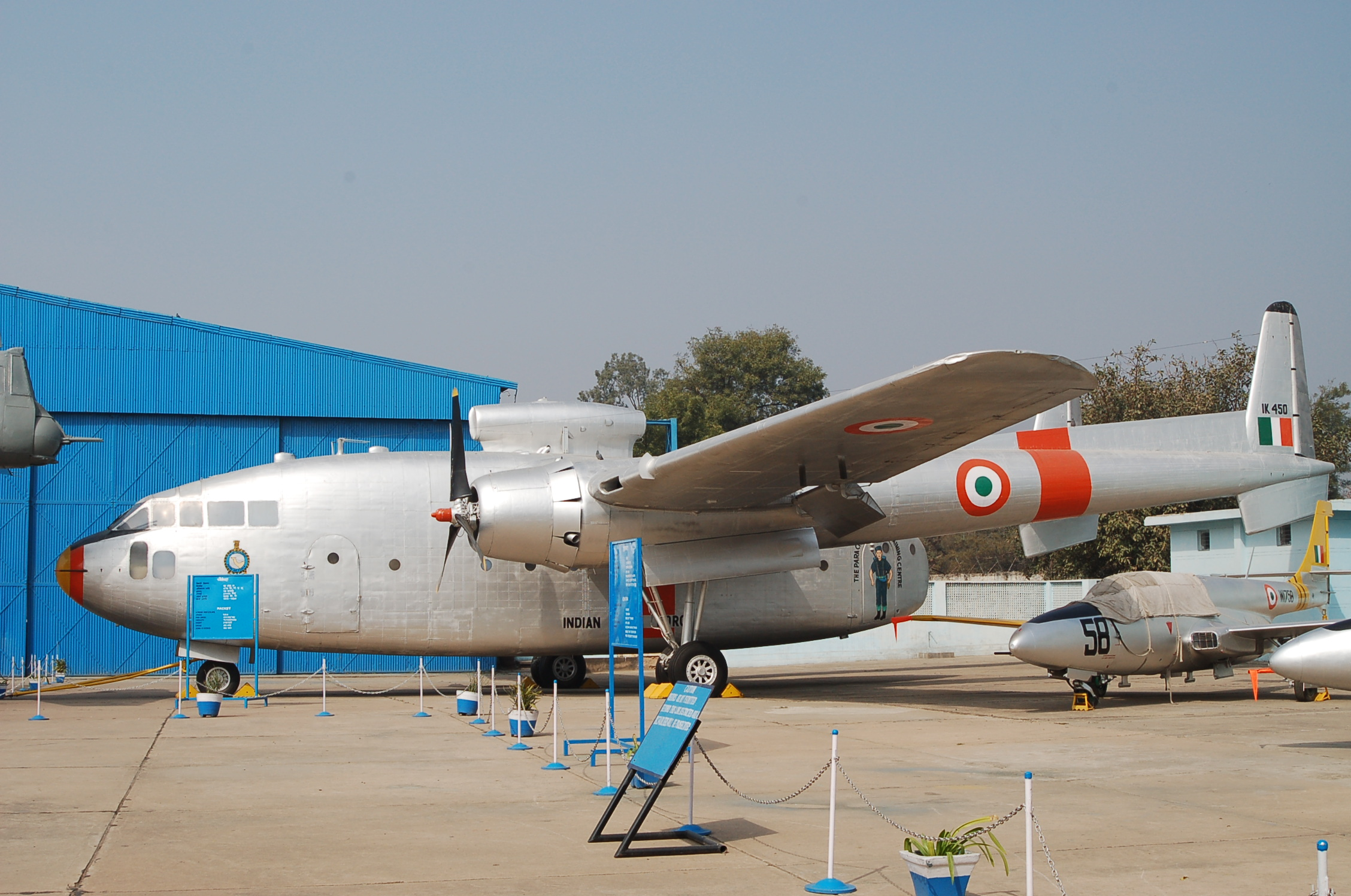
- A C-119 Boxcar of the Indian Air Force - the Tangail Airdrop relied heavily on these during the drop.
Date	11 – 12 December 1971
Location	Tangail, East Pakistan
Result	Indian victory: Indian forces capture and hold Poongli Bridge; Smooth advance of 95th Mountain Brigade towards Dhaka facilitated; Pakistani 93rd Brigade eliminated as a fighting formation and unable to reinforce Dhaka

Belligerents
India	Pakistan

Commanders and leaders
(India) Lt Col K.S. Pannu	(Pakistan) Brig. Abdul Qadir Khan (surrendered)

Units involved
95th Mountain Brigade: 56 Mountain Regiment; 852 Light Battery; 13 Guards; 1 Maratha Light Infantry (Only unit involved in combat); 13 Rajputana Rifles; 94 Field Company (Sappers); 2 Para Indian Air Force: 6 x An-12s; 20 x C-119 Boxcars; 22 x C-47 Skytrains	93rd Infantry Brigade: 83 (Indep) Mortar Battery; 33 Punjab Regiment; 31 Baloch Regiment (surrendered to Indian forces 10 Dec); 70 Wing Rangers; 71 Wing Rangers; ~5,000 Razakars

Strength
2 Para; 750 men in 4 Companies 1 Maratha Light Infantry; ~750–1,000 men	93rd Brigade (Severely Understrength): 200–300 regular infantry; 100–200 Rangers; 600 Razakars + paramilitary

Casualties and losses
2 Para; 3 KIA; 20 MIA (lost during drop); 1 WIA 1 Maratha Light; None	93rd Brigade + Razakars; 282 KIA; 42 POW

The Tangail Airdrop (11 December 1971) was an airborne operation conducted by the Indian Army in order to seize Poongli Bridge and ferry in the Tangail area. The operation, involving the 2nd Battalion of the Indian Army's Parachute Regiment (2 Para) is often regarded as one of the largest - if not the largest - airborne operation following World War II. The operation saw the capture of all objectives and the repulsion of the Pakistan Army's 93rd Infantry Brigade which was attempting to withdraw to Dhaka to bolster its defence.

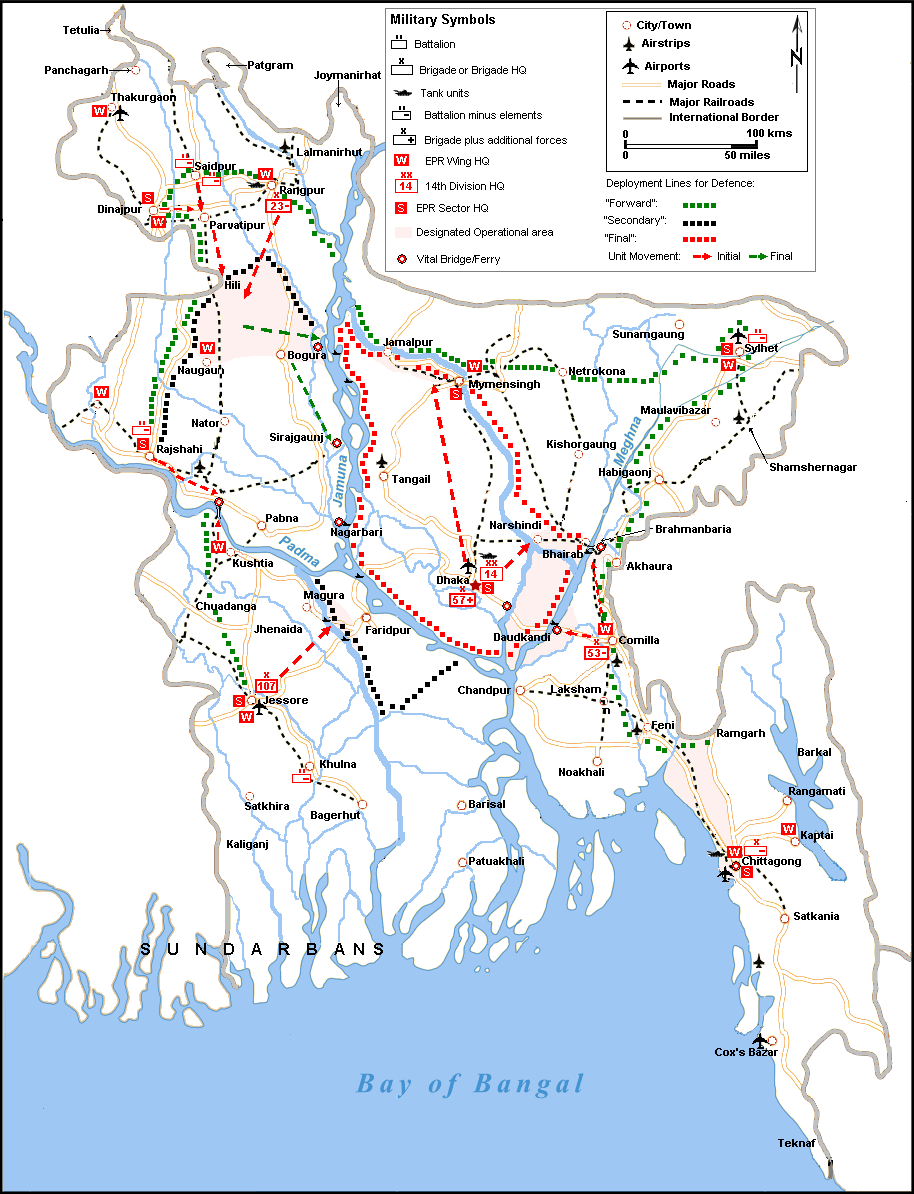
Pakistani Eastern Command plan for the defence of East Pakistan from 1967 to 1971 (generic representation—some unit locations not shown.

== Objective and Preparation ==
=== Objective ===
The objectives of 2 Para for the drop were simple:

- Secure Poongli Bridge over the Lohajang River
- Secure the ferry crossing point and the ferries on the East of the bridge
- Intercept and prevent the Pakistani 93rd Infantry Brigade from withdrawing across the river
- Link up with 1 Maratha Light and push towards Dhaka

=== Reconnaissance ===
The Indian Army had realised the importance of Poongli Bridge and crossing the river there early on and had recognised that for any future offensives into Bangladesh, its capture was necessary. To this end, in November 1971 Captain F. K. Ghosh of the Parachute Regiment had been infiltrated into Bangladesh and then into the Tangail area through 11 Sector. His objective had been to link up with Mukti Bahini commander Kader Siddiqui in order to locate potential drop zones.

It was the intelligence gathered by Captain Ghosh that allowed the Indian Army to develop the plan required to capture the bridge and secure the advance towards Dhaka.

== Orders of Battle ==
=== Indian Army ===
Though the entire 95th Mountain Brigade was advancing down towards Tangail, the battle would only be fought by the following:

- 2nd Battalion, Parachute Regiment (detached from F-J Sector Force, an ad hoc brigade size formation)
- 1st Battalion, Maratha Light Infantry

=== Pakistani Army ===
The 93rd Infantry Brigade, that had fought the advance of the 95th every step of the way, was also an ad hoc force. However, they were severely understrength at the time of the Tangail battle. The order of battle was thus:

- 33 Punjab
  - Understrength by 1 Company at the time of battle.
- 31 Baluch
  - Destroyed during the Battle of Jamalpur, 10 December. Survivors surrendered to Indian forces.
- 70 Wing Rangers (Understrength, folded into 33 Punjab)
- 71 Wing Rangers (Understrength, folded into 33 Punjab)
- ~5,000 Razakars (Reduced to 600 at the time of battle, according to Pakistani sources)

== The operation: 11–12 December 1971 ==
=== The drop ===
The operation began in the afternoon of 11 December. By 1650hrs, the 750 men of 2 Para along with their pack howitzers and jeeps had landed successfully north of Tangail. However, 20 men had gotten lost during the drop. 19 of them would be dropped 24 kilometers north of the DZ. The 20th man, Paratrooper Mahadeo Curao, suffered a "hang up" during the drop and had to be dropped near Sara Airfield with his secondary parachute. Despite being wounded and alone, he evaded capture and linked up with a local Mukti Bahini unit, with whom he went on numerous raids to eliminate "Razakars" before rejoining his unit on 2 January 1972 – a full 33 days after the end of the war.

2 Para was dropped 9 kilometers north of Tangail. Near Kalihati (a town near Tangail), Brigadier Qadir (CO of 93rd Brigade) witnessed the drop and ordered a nearby company to engage the paratroopers while they were still regrouping. However, the company did not reach in time and the paratroopers had managed to regroup and organise themselves. Realising this, Brigadier Qadir ordered his brigade to begin preparations to attack the paratroopers.

By the evening, the paratroopers had crossed the 9 km towards their objective - Poongli Bridge. Initial reconnaissance revealed that the bridge was lightly defended: only 2 Pakistani infantry platoons with a ragtag group of Razakars. Leaving "D" Company behind to cover their flanks, the rest of the battalion commenced their attack on the bridge. The lightly defended bridge, along with the ferry crossing point, would be overrun and captured by 2000hrs with Indian forces suffering no casualties. "D" Company now reinforced the positions at the bridge and 2 Para dug in to defend it.

=== Pakistani counterattacks ===
Through the night of the 11th/12th and the first half of the 12th, the 93rd Brigade would launch 5 counterattacks on 2 Para. However, the 93rd's fighting ability had already been degraded greatly. On 10 December, the Indian 167th Mountain Brigade along with the 95th Mountain Brigade had surrounded 31 Baluch of the Pakistani 93rd in Jamalpur. Though 31 Baluch put up a fight, it had surrendered by 0730hrs. This resulted in the surrender of ~1,500 men and multiple artillery guns. The rest of the 93rd had been subjected to constant air attacks by the Indian Air Force and its professional forces had suffered a further 252 casualties (killed and captured) between 3 and 10 December, during the 95th Mountain Brigade's advance.

With the surrender of 31 Baluch, the only unit of the 93rd left in fighting condition was 33 Punjab which had been reinforced by the remaining companies of the Pakistan Rangers. 33 Punjab, while leaving Madhupur during their retreat to Dhaka, had left behind one of its companies to defend Madhupur. Therefore, by the time the 93rd counterattacked 2 Para's positions at Poongli, they were severely understrength and disorganised. This resulted in all 5 of their attacks being badly coordinated. The attacks were further hampered by the fact that the Pakistani regulars had to rely on the ill-trained Razakars to bolster their numbers during the attacks. The Razakars would make up the majority of the casualties. Airstrikes by the IAF throughout the morning and noon of 12 December also further degraded the 93rd's capability.

By 1500hrs on the 12th, 1 Maratha Light had linked up with 2 Para at Poongli and further secured the bridge. 2 Para and 1 Maratha Light would set up ambushes for the Pakistani infantry and regularly harass their lines throughout the remainder of the 12th. By the end of the 12th, because of their badly coordinated counterattacks and the Indian forces' well conducted raids, the 93rd would cease to exist as a fighting unit, suffering over 300 casualties. By 1745hrs on the 12th, the Pakistani forces that survived began their retreat to Kaliakar.

== Aftermath ==
The Tangail Airdrop and the subsequent capture of the Poongli bridge gave the advancing Indian Army a highway straight to Dhaka. The 95th Mountain Brigade's advance, assisted by the 167th Mountain Brigade, would be virtually unchecked. The fighting at Jamalpur and Poongli Bridge, combined with the fighting between 3 and 10 December would virtually destroy the Pakistani 93rd Brigade. Brigadier Qadir, CO of the 93rd Brigade, would be captured by Indian troops - along with 26 other men and officers - on 14 December near while attempting to retreat to Kaliakar on foot. Eventually, only 900 men out of the 93rd's ~7,000 would reach Dhaka, with the rest having either been captured or killed.

A Pakistani officer, Major (later Brigadier) Siddique Salik recalled the arrival in Dhaka of the bedraggled survivors of the 93rd: "I saw them arriving: they were unshaven, unwashed and even bootless. Their faces were starved, eyes sleepless and ankles swollen. They needed at least twenty-four hours to be able to participate in the defence of the provincial capital."

== Battle awards ==
Indian commander Lt Col Kulwant Singh was awarded the MVC for his leadership in battle. The 2 Paras were subsequently the first Indian forces to enter Dhaka. For this and their role in Capture of the strategic bridge, the Paras received battle honour for Poongli Bridge and theatre honours for Dhaka.

== See also ==
- India-Pakistan battles
- Timeline of the Bangladesh Liberation War
- Military plans of the Bangladesh Liberation War
- Mitro Bahini order of battle
- Pakistan Army order of battle, December 1971
- Evolution of Pakistan Eastern Command plan
- Indo-Pakistani wars and conflicts
