= Battle of Dhalai =

1971 battle between India and Pakistan

Coordinates: 24.2185°N 91.8260°E

- Part of Bangladesh Liberation War
Date	28 October – 3 November 1971 (6 days)
Location	Dhalai, Bangladesh
Result	Bangladesh–India victory
Territorial changes	Indian army capture Dhalai

Belligerents
India; Bangladesh	Pakistan

Commanders and leaders
(India) Lt. Gen Sagat Singh (India) Brigadier Kailas Prasad Pandey (India) Lt. Col. Devasan (WIA) (India) Brigadier Shiv Yadav (WIA) (Bangladesh) Major Mohammad Ziauddin	(Pakistan) Major Javed †

Units involved
(Bangladesh) 1st East Bengal Regiment (India) 61 Mountain Brigade (India) 7 Rajputana Rifles (India) 2 Artillery Brigade	(Pakistan) 12 Frontier Force

Strength
(Bangladesh) Unknown (India) 215	(Pakistan) 800

The Battle of Dhalai was fought between India and Pakistan before the formal start 1971 India-Pakistan War for the liberation of Bangladesh. The battle started after an attack by Indian Army on Pakistani border outpost (BOP) in East Pakistan on 28 October and lasted until 3 November 1971. Three infantry battalions belonging to 61 Mountain Brigade, one battalion belonging to East Bengal Regiment and 7 Rajputana Rifles supported by an artillery-sized brigade of Indian army fought against a battalion-sized 12 Frontier Force of Pakistan army.

The task to capture Dhalai was initially given to Mukti Bahini. However, Mukti Bahini assault on Pakistani positions in Dhalai was not totally successful. Later the Indian army joined with them. Pakistani troops under the command of Major Javed fought valiantly against the Indian troops. After suffering fair number of casualties as result of fierce resistance put up by Frontier Force, Mukti Bahini and Indian army under the command of Sagat Singh was able to capture Dhalai. Pakistan troops in the area withdrew and Major Javed of Pakistan army was killed in the battle. Brigadier Shiv Yadav, the Brigade commander and Lt. Col. Devasan of 7 Rajputana Rifles of Indian army were also badly injured in this battle. Hamidur Rahman of East Bengal Regiment was also killed.

== Awards ==
Hamidur Rahman of East Bengal Regiment was posthumously awarded the Bir Sreshtho, Bangladesh's highest award for valor, for his actions during the conflict.

General Sagat Singh was highly impressed by Brigadier Pandey's performance during the battle and he recommended him for Maha Vir Chakra, India's second-highest military award.

== See also ==
- Timeline of the Bangladesh Liberation War
- Military plans of the Bangladesh Liberation War
- Mitro Bahini order of battle
- Pakistan Army order of battle, December 1971
- Evolution of Pakistan Eastern Command plan
- Bangladesh genocide
- Operation Searchlight
- Indo-Pakistani wars and conflicts
