= Timeline of the Bangladesh Liberation War =

9 Month long War in East Pakistan

The Bangladesh War of Independence started on 26 March 1971 and ended on 16 December 1971. Some of the major events of the war are listed in the timeline below.

== Timeline ==
Interactive Timeline of the Bangladesh War

=== Before the war ===
- 1 March: General Yahya Khan calls off the session of National Council to be held on 3 March in a radio address.
- 7 March: Sheikh Mujibur Rahman – leader of Awami League party that had won a landslide victory in Pakistan in the Federal Elections of 1970, but never been granted authority – announces to a jubilant crowd at the Dhaka Race Course ground, "The struggle this time is the struggle for our emancipation! The struggle this time is the struggle for independence!".
- 9 March: Workers of Chittagong port refuse to unload weapons from the ship 'MV Swat'.
- 16 March: Yahya Khan starts negotiation with Sheikh Mujibur Rahman.
- 19 March: Nearly 200 people are injured at Jaydevpur during clashes between protesters and the Pakistan Army.
- 24 March: The Pakistan Army opens fire on Bengali protesters in Syedpur and Rangpur. About 150 people are killed.

=== Events during the War ===
==== March ====
- 25 March to 26 March: Pakistan Army starts crackdown in the form of Operation Searchlight in Dhaka and the rest of the country, attacking general civilians, political activists, students, and Bengali members of armed forces and police.
- 26 March: At 1:15 am, Sheikh Mujibur Rahman is arrested at his home by a Pakistani commando company. The Independence of Bangladesh is declared by Sheikh Mujibur Rahman a few minutes before he was arrested by the Pakistan army.
- 27 March: Independence of Bangladesh is again declared by Maj. Ziaur Rahman on behalf of Sheikh Mujibur Rahman, Santahar massacre is committed by the Mukti Bahini, thousands of non-Bengalis are attacked by Mukti Bahini members.
- 27 March: Bangladesh Forces and Partisans massacred Pakistani Soldiers at Mymensingh Cantonment.
- 31 March: Battle of Kushtia, Kushtia resistance begins.

==== April ====
- 2 April: Jinjira massacre.
- 6 April: The Blood Telegram
- 8 April: Battle of Rangamati-Mahalchari waterway.
- 10 April: A provisional Bangladesh government-in-exile is formed.
- 11 April: Radio address by Tajuddin Ahmad, the Prime Minister of Bangladesh.
- 12 April: M. A. G. Osmani takes up the command of Bangladesh Armed Forces.
- 17 April: A provisional government-in-exile took oath in Baidyanathtala (now called Mujibnagar) in Meherpur District
- 18 April: Battle of Daruin, Comilla and Chittagong Hill Tracts.
- 24 April: Formation of Bangladesh Action Committee at Coventry, UK by non-resident Bangladeshis.
- 25 April to 15 August: Operation Jackpot by Mukti Bahini
- 28 April: Tajuddin pleas for arms aid from India.

==== May ====
- 5 May: Gopalpur massacre.
- 15 May: Indian army starts aiding Mukti Bahini.
- 20 May: The Chuknagar massacre takes place at Khulna where the Pakistan army kills nearly 10 thousand people
- 24 May: Swadhin Bangla Betar Kendra finds home in Kolkata.

==== June ====
- 12 June: Battle of Kamalpur begins.

==== July ====
- 11–17 July: Sector Commanders Conference in 1971.

==== August ====
- 1 August: The Concert for Bangladesh in Madison Square Garden, New York by Ravi Shankar, George Harrison and friends.
- 16 August: Operation Jackpot, Bangladesh naval commando operation.
- 20 August: Flight Lieutenant Matiur Rahman's attempt to defect by hijacking a fighter.
- 30 August: Pakistan Army crackdown on Dhaka guerrillas.

==== September ====
- 5 September: Battle of Goalhati, Jessore.
- 28 September: Bangladesh Air Force starts functioning.

==== October ====
- 13 October: Dhaka guerrillas kill Abdul Monem Khan, governor of East Pakistan.
- 28 October to 3 November: Battle of Dhalai in which 3 companies (215 soldiers) of the Jat Regiment (2 JAT) of Indian Army defeated a battalion (800 soldiers) of 30th Frontier Force Rifles (30 FFR) of Pakistan Army. Hamidur Rahman of Mukti Bahini was posthumously awarded the Bir Sreshtho, the highest recognition of bravery in Bangladesh.
- 31 October to 3 November: Battle of Dhalai: Allied attack from Tripura into East Pakistan to stop Pakistani cross-border shelling.

==== November ====
- 9 November: Six small ships constitute the first fleet of Bangladesh Navy.
- 16 November: Battle of Ajmiriganj, an 18-hour encounter between Mukti Bahini and Pakistan army. A famous freedom fighter, Jagat Joity Das, is killed.
- 14 November to 4 December: The Battle of Kamalpur began, where Pakistani troops defended Kamalpur for 21 days before being ordered to surrender by their superiors.
- 20 to 21 November: Battle of Garibpur: India attacked Pakistani forces and captured Boyra salient in East Pakistan
- 21 November: Bangladesh Armed Forces are formed.
- 22 November to 13 December, and sporadic fighting to 16 December: Battle of Hilli: Indian attack on Bogra in East Pakistan.

==== December ====
- 3 December: Bangladesh Air Force destroys Pakistani oil depots.
- 3 December: Pakistani pre-emptive airstrikes in India. As a result, India declares war against Pakistan.
- 3 to 6 December: Battle of Chamb; Pakistan attacks and takes over part of southern Kashmir from India.
- 4 December : Battle of Longewala; India stops a Pakistani invasion directed at Jaisalmer.
- 4 to 5 December: Operation Trident: Indian naval attack on Karachi, West Pakistan.
- 4 to 5 December : Battle of Gazipur in which Indian Army and Mukti Bahini captured Gazipur
- 5 December : Battle of Basantar; India attacks and takes over Pakistani territory in the Shakargarh Salient, opposite Jammu.
- 6 December: Jashore (Jessore) became the first district in Bangladesh to be liberated from Pakistani control. Bhutan becomes the first country to recognise Bangladesh followed by India . Swadhin Bangla Betar Kendra becomes Bangladesh Betar.
- 7 to 16 December: Battle of Sylhet, liberation of Jessore, Sylhet and Moulovi Bazar.
- 8 December: Operation Python: Indian naval attack on Karachi, West Pakistan.
- 9 December: India attack from West Bengal into East Pakistan. Chandpur and Daudkandi liberated from Pakistan.
- 9 December: Meghna Heli Bridge operation
- 10 December: Liberation of Laksham. Two Bangladeshi ships sunk mistakenly by an Indian air attack.
- 11 December: Tangail Airdrop, which liberated Poongli Bridge on the Jamuna river
- 11 December: Liberation of Hilli, Mymenshingh, Kushtia and Noakhali. USS Enterprise is deployed by the US Navy in the Bay of Bengal to intimidate the Indian Navy.
- 13 December: Soviet Navy deploys a group of warships to counter Enterprise. The Enterprise moves towards Southeast Asia, averting a confrontation.
- 13 December: Battle of Shiromani began for the rest of the war
- 14 December: Selective genocide of Bengali nationalist intellectuals.
- 14 December: Liberation of Bogra.
- 16 December: End of the Bangladesh Liberation War. Mitro Bahini takes Dhaka. approximately 93,000 troops of Pakistan Armed Forces surrenders to Mitro Bahini represented by Jagjit Singh Aurora of the Indian Army faction of the military coalition.
- 22 December: The provisional government of Bangladesh arrives in Dhaka from exile.

== See also ==
- History of Bangladesh
- Timeline of Bangladeshi history
- Indo-Pakistani War of 1971
- Mitro Bahini order of battle
- Pakistan Army order of battle, December 1971
- Evolution of Pakistan Eastern Command plan
- Military plans of the Bangladesh Liberation War
- Indo-Pakistani wars and conflicts
- List of timelines
- Bangladesh Liberation War Library and Research Centre, a Digital Library, working to 'preserve and publicly distribute' the historical documents regarding the Liberation War of Bangladesh and Genocide of Innocent Bengali People in 1971.
