= E. S. B. Bhombal =

- Ebrahim Shaik Baba Bhombal

Chairman of the Karachi Port Trust
- In office 1931–1949

Personal details
- Children: A. W. Bhombal
- Nickname: E. S. B. Bhombal

Military service
- Allegiance: Pakistan
- Branch/service: Pakistan Navy
- Years of service: 1941–49
- Rank: Lieutenant
- Unit: Executive Branch
- Battles/wars: World War II

Ebrahim Shaik Baba Bhombal was a Pakistani bureaucrat and a naval officer who served as the chairman of the Karachi Port Trust. He was a senior Pakistani maritime pilot and port manager, and the first Indian to be appointed as a pilot in British India. A Master in the British Merchant Navy, he was appointed Pilot by the Karachi Port Trust in 1931. During World War II he was commissioned by the Royal Indian Navy and worked as Dock Master in Karachi, where after the war he was made Harbour Master. In 1949 the Government of Pakistan requisitioned his services for the development and expansion of Chittagong Port in East Bengal (later East Pakistan, now Bangladesh). In 1950 he was responsible for organizing and overseeing the establishment of a second port in East Bengal, at Chalna. Chalna Port would be Pakistan's third port, and the first to be established after the country's independence. Bhombal subsequently served as Port Director and Conservator at Chalna.

Bhombal obtained his training in the Royal Indian Marine, after which he obtained his Foreign-going Second Mate Certificate. In 1929 he obtained his Foreign-going Master Certificate in the United Kingdom. He joined the British Merchant Navy and within a short while reached the rank of Chief Officer and then Master of the Vessel. He possessed a British Extra Master Certificate.

== Assignments at Karachi Port ==
In 1931 Bhombal was appointed by the Karachi Port Trust in what was reported to be the first appointment in India of an Indian pilot. Being the only Indian among applicants for the post, his application was the subject of much discussion among members of the Trust. After being considered at four separate meetings that were repeatedly adjourned, the decision was finally taken on 23 October 1931, after some European members voted in favor of Bhombal.

During World War II he was commissioned by the Royal Indian Navy and worked as Dock Master at Karachi Port Trust. After the war he was made Harbour Master at Karachi.

== Assignments at Chittagong Port ==
In July 1949 the Pakistan Ministry of Communications requisitioned Bhombal's services as a special officer for the development of Chittagong Port in East Pakistan. However within two weeks of his arrival he was given the duties of Deputy Conservator, in which capacity he was to pilot ships in and out of the port and to train men. In addition to these duties, Bhombal completed the laying of five heavy first-class moorings which greatly increased the capacity of Chittagong Port, allowing it to take double the amount of foreign-going vessels. Previously the port had only six jetty berths and one mooring. In addition to the five heavy moorings, he also succeeded in laying numerous light moorings to accommodate small coastal vessels in the Karnaphuli River.

== Assignments at Chalna Port ==
Following surveys of the Pasur River in 1948, the Pakistani government decided to establish an auxiliary anchorage to Chittagong at Chalna. The Communications Ministry selected Bhombal to organize and launch this new project. The Government announced the target date for the opening of Chalna Anchorage to be 8 December 1950. Bhombal arrived in Khulna on 4 October. With the work of Bhombal and his team, the port was informally opened on 11 December.

Bhombal became Port Director and Conservator of the new port, with the designation "Officer-in-Charge". In 1954 the Port Directorate was shifted a few miles downstream to Mongla.
