= A. W. Bhombal =

Two-star rank admiral in the Pakistan Navy

Chairman of the Pakistan National Shipping Corporation
- In office 4 December 1980 – 11 January 1986
- Preceded by: R-Adm Leslie Mungavin
- Succeeded by: V-Adm. Y. H. Malik

President of the Pakistan Squash Federation
- In office 1980–1986

Personal details
- Born: 13 October 1931 Karachi, Bombay Presidency, British India (in present-day Sindh, Pakistan)
- Died: 31 December 2008 (aged 77) Peshawar, NWFP, Pakistan
- Parent: E.S.B. Bhombal (father)
- Nickname: AW Bhombal

Military service
- Allegiance: Pakistan
- Branch/service: Pakistan Navy
- Years of service: 1949–86
- Rank: Rear-Admiral
- Unit: Executive Branch (S/No. PN 296)
- Commands: Pakistan Naval Air Arm; Naval War College; GM Karachi Port Trust
- Battles/wars: Indo-Pakistani War of 1965; Indo-Pakistani War of 1971
- Awards: Sitara-i-Imtiaz (military)

Abdul Waheed Bhombal (13 October 1931 – 31 December 2008), SI(M), best known as A. W. Bhombal was a two-star rank admiral in the Pakistan Navy and the chairman of the Pakistan National Shipping Corporation from 1980 until retirement from military service in 1986. Bhombal was disciplined by the Pakistani Navy for his role in the friendly fire sinking of PNS Zulfiqar after the missile attack on the Port of Karachi.

== Biography ==
Abdul Waheed Bhombal was born on 13 October 1931 in Karachi, Bombay Presidency, British India (in present-day Sindh, Pakistan). He was the son of E.S.B. Bhombal and was of Konkani descent. Bhombal enlisted in the Pakistani Navy in 1949, and was trained in the United Kingdom before participating in the Indo-Pakistani War of 1965.

In 1971, Commodore Bhombal volunteered to join the Pakistan Naval Aviation, boarding a civilian PIA's Fokker F27 aircraft after the first missile attack in the Port of Karachi to conduct maritime reconnaissance. While in the west of Cape Monze, Bhombal reportedly gave the clearance to the Faisal Air Force Base in Karachi to scramble North American F-86 Sabre jets to attack a presumed Indian Navy missile boat that was later identified as the PNS Zulfiqar (K265)— the large River-class frigate.

After the Indo-Pakistani war of 1971 with India in 1971, the Pakistan Air Force held the Navy responsible for the friendly fire incident took place on PNS Zulfiqar, and held Cdre. A. W. Bhombal responsible for giving clearance to the fighter aircraft, when had little experience in conducting the maritime reconnaissance. In 1972, the Navy reportedly accepted the Air Force's recommendation and took the disciplinary action, with Bhombal was reportedly demoted from his one-star rank to Captain, and was directed to attend the National Defense University. Bhombal earned a MSc in war studies in 1973, graduating alongside Lieutenant-Colonel Mirza Aslam Beg.

After his graduation in 1973, Capt. Bhombal joined the faculty staff of the Pakistan Naval War College in Lahore as a professor of war studies. He was later appointed as commandant of the staff college— the Naval War College in Lahore.

In 1977, Capt. Bhombal was promoted back to the one-star rank, Commodore, and posted as the General-Manager at the Karachi Port Trust (GM KPT). In 1980, Cdre. Bhombal was promoted to the two-star rank, of Rear-Admiral, and posted as the Chairman of the Pakistan National Shipping Corporation (PNSC) on 4 December 1980. R-Adm. Bhombal chaired the PNSC for six years, eventually retiring on 11 January 1986, and his tenureship was regarded as successfully as the PNSC turned into a profitable state corporation.

In 1980, Bhombal was appointed as the president of the Pakistan Squash Federation, and oversaw the first Pakistan Open in 1980 in Karachi. He remained the president until 1986.

After his retirement, was involved in an incident when a group of Dacoits held him on gun point in his car while making a monetary transaction from the bank in 1988.

Bhombal died in Peshawar, Pakistan, on 31 December 2008.

== See also ==
- Konkani Muslims
- Islam in India
- PNS Zulfiqar (K265)
