= Kulwant Singh Pannu =

Officer of the Indian Army

Major General Kulwant Singh Pannu MVC
- Born: 6 March 1932
- Military career
- Allegiance: India
- Branch: Indian Army
- Service years: 1952-1988
- Rank: Major General
- Service number: IC-6213
- Units: 3 Gorkha Rifles; 2 PARA
- Conflicts: Indo-Pakistan War of 1971; Tangail Airdrop
- Awards: Maha Vir Chakra

Major General Kulwant Singh Pannu, MVC was an officer of the Indian Army and a recipient of the Maha Vir Chakra. He was initially commissioned as an officer in the 3 Gorkha Rifles in 1952, and joined the Parachute Regiment in 1957 after completing the paratrooper officers' course. Pannu is most famous for having led 2 Para in the famous Tangail Airdrop to capture the Poongli Bridge over the River Jamuna on 11 December 1971, during the Bangladesh Liberation War. The battalion was airdropped near Tangail (now in Bangladesh) and tasked to cut off the 93 Brigade of Pakistani Army which was retreating from the north to defend Dhaka and its approaches. For his conspicuous gallantry and leadership, Pannu was awarded the Maha Vir Chakra.

== Maha Vir Chakra ==
Gazette Notification: 18 Pres/72,12-2-72
Operation: 1971 Cactus Lily
Date of Award: 11 Dec 1971

Citation:

Lieutenant Colonel K. S. Pannu was commanding a battalion, which was airdropped near Tangail on 11 December 1971. The task involved cutting enemy routes of withdrawal and preventing his build-up at Tangail. This also involved the capture of an enemy position on a vital bridge at Poongli. The drop of the battalion was widely dispersed and Lieutenant Colonel Pannu had to move from one location to another under enemy fire to collect his platoons. It was entirely due to his cool courage, utter disregard for his personal safety and his timely and skilful direction that his battalion captured the enemy position at Poongli, under his able leadership, the battalion repulsed numerous counter-attacks inflicting heavy casualties on the enemy. Lieutenant Colonel Pannu displayed conspicuous gallantry, exemplary leadership, determination and devotion to duty in keeping with the best traditions of the Army.
