= Hamidur Rahman =

Bangladeshi army sepoy

Hamidur Rahman Bir Sreshtho
- হামিদুর রহমান
- Born: 2 February 1953; Moheshpur, East Bengal, Pakistan
- Died: 28 October 1971 (aged 18); Srimangal, Bangladesh
- Military career
- Allegiance: Bangladesh
- Branch: Bangladesh Army
- Service years: 1971
- Rank: Sepoy (No: 3943014)
- Unit: 1st East Bengal Regiment
- Conflicts: Bangladesh Liberation War †, Sector-4
- Awards: Bir Sreshtho

Hamidur Rahman (Bengali: হামিদুর রহমান; 2 February 1953 – 28 October 1971) was a sepoy in the Bangladesh Army during the Bangladesh Liberation War.

Rahman was killed on 28 October 1971 at Dholoi during the Battle of Dhalai, Srimangal, during an attempt to capture the Pakistani Army position. The advancing Mukti Bahini column finally captured the Dhalai Border Outpost on 3 November 1971. He was posthumously awarded the Bir Sreshtho, the highest recognition of bravery in Bangladesh. The Dhalai post was eventually captured permanently by three infantry battalions belonging to the 61 Mountain Brigade, one battalion belonging to the East Bengal Regiment, and the 7 Rajputana Rifles, supported by an artillery brigade of the Indian Army fought against the 12 Frontier Force Regiment of the Pakistan Army.

== Background ==
Rahman was born on 2 February 1953 in Khardo Khalishpur village (renamed Hamid Nagar) in Moheshpur thana of the Jhenaidah District. Hamidur Rahman Degree College was named in his honour. He was the eldest son of his family. During the Partition of India in 1947, his paternal properties fell in India. They crossed over the border and settled in the bordering area of Khorda Khalishpur of Jhenaidah.

== Liberation war ==
Hamidur Rahman joined the East Bengal Regiment on 2 February 1971 and participated in the 1971 Bangladesh Liberation War. During the war, he made a significant contribution in capturing the Dhalai Border Outpost at Srimangal. Though the independence fighters came close to the border outpost, it became difficult to capture owing to the enemy machine gun that was continuously firing from the south-western corner of the Dhalai Border Outpost. On 28 October 1971, a battle was taking place between the 1st East Bengal Regiment and the 30 Frontier Force Regiment in Dhalai of Sylhet. 125 members of the East Bengal Regiment decided to use grenades on the machine gun posts of the army. Rahman took the responsibility of throwing grenades, and crawled through the hilly canals. He managed to throw two grenades before he was shot. Rahman jumped into the enemy machine gun post and engaged in hand-to-hand fighting with the two crews who were guarding the gun, and at one point neutralised the gun. Realizing that the machine gun outpost was damaged, the EBR's approach towards the enemy captured their first line within a short period of time. After the capture of the Dhalai Border Outpost, members of the EBR found the dead body of Rahman. Rahman's efforts helped the East Bengal Regiment take the outpost. He was buried in Tripura in India.

=== Reburial ===
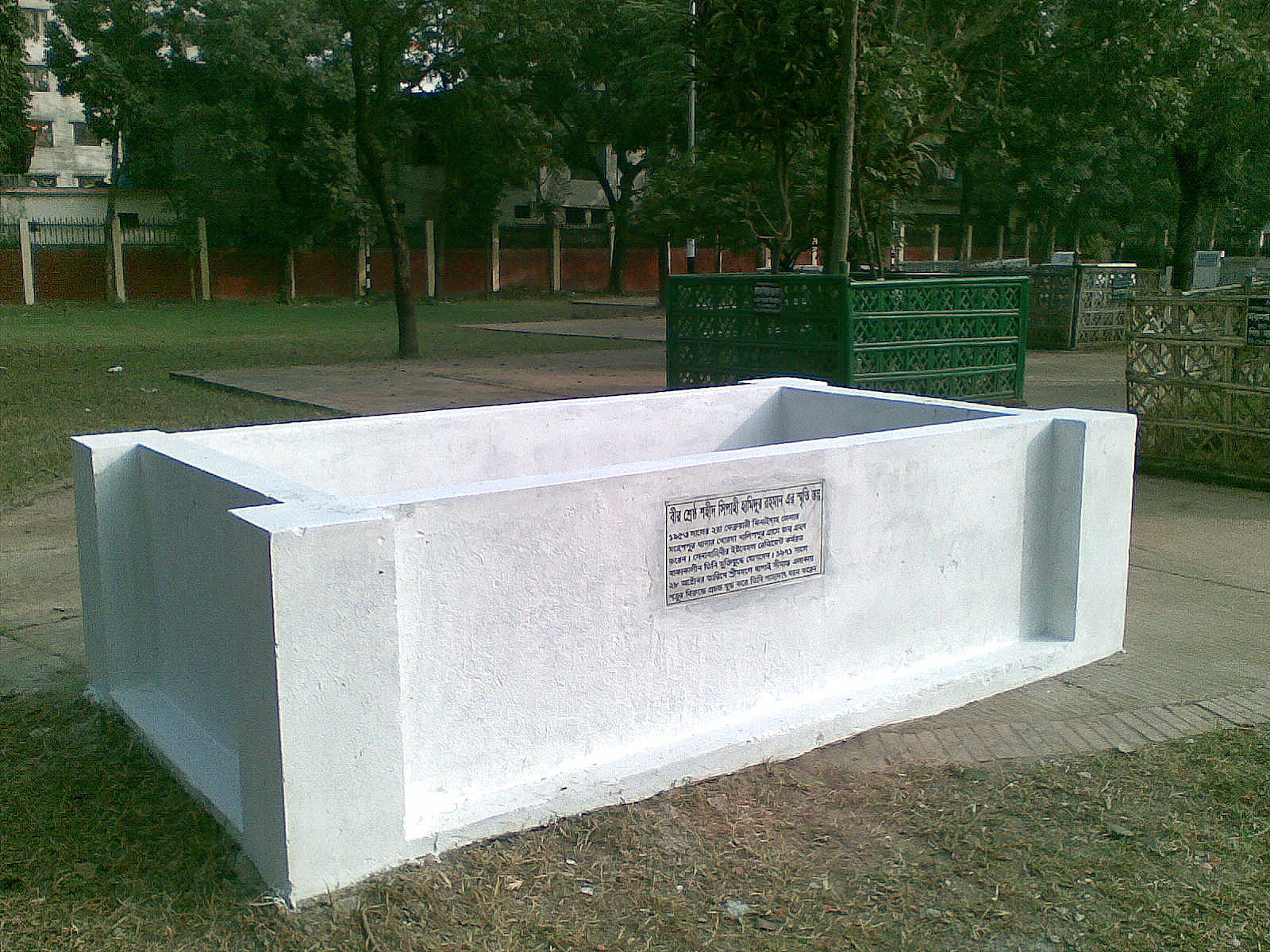
Grave

On 27 October 2007, advisers of the Bangladeshi caretaker government decided to bring back his remains to Bangladesh and bury him beside Bir Shrestho Matiur Rahman. It is said that the last place he stood alive was about 20 feet away from the Pakistani bunker, either in a canal or where the memorial is (near the bunker). On 10 December 2007, the remains of Rahman were brought back to Bangladesh, and on 11 December 2007, he was buried again at Buddhijibi Koborsthan (Cemetery), Dhaka.

Rahman was posthumously awarded the Bir Sreshtho, Bangladesh's highest award for valor, for his actions.

== Legacy ==
Bir Shreshtha Hamidur Rahman Stadium in Jhenaidah district is named after him. A ferry was named after him. A library and museum was built in his memory, and the village he was born in, Khordo Khalishpur, has been renamed Hamid Nagar. Hamidur Rahman Degree College was named in his honour. Adamjee Cantonment College, a prestigious institution of Bangladesh, has one of their houses named after Hamidur Rahman.
