= Jagat Joity Das =

Bangladeshi freedom fighter (1949–1971)

Bir Bikrom Jagat Joity Das
- জগৎজ্যোতি দাস
- Sketch-portrait of Jagat Joity Das
- Born: April 26, 1949; Habiganj, Sylhet, East Bengal
- Died: November 16, 1971 (aged 22); Habiganj, Sylhet, Bangladesh
- Known for: Bangladesh Liberation War
- Awards: Bir Bikrom

Jagatjyoti Das (Bengali: জগৎজ্যোতি দাস pronunciation: Jôgôtjôti Dāsh, English variant: Jagat Joity Das) was a Bangladeshi freedom fighter and a martyr of the Bangladesh Liberation War. He was a guerrilla of the Mukti Bahini and the commander of the 'Das Party' squad. He was posthumously awarded the Bir Bikrom, the third highest award for gallantry, for his role in the freedom movement of Bangladesh.

== Early life and education ==
Das was born in Jalsukha village, Ajmiriganj, Habiganj District, East Bengal, Pakistan (now Bangladesh), in 1949. His father was Jitendra Das. Jagot Joity joined the movement against the Ayub Khan junta while still in school. In 1968, he passed his examinations and entered Sunamganj College, where he was an active member of the Menon Group Student Union. In 1969, Das went to Guwahati, India, where he entered Nampong College and learned about guerrilla warfare.

== Bangladesh war of liberation ==
Das received training in Meghalaya and joined the guerrilla group of Mukti Bahini afterwards, which operated primarily in the Sunamganj Netrokona Habiganj river, or Haor, area. His group was known to the local people as Das Party. According to Abdul Kaium, one fellow commander of Das, the name "Das Party" was officially approved by the Bangladesh Liberation Army.

Das operated a number of guerrilla missions, such as the Paharpur operation, the Baniachong police station attack, and the Badalpur operation, driving out the Pakistani military from the region. Given the Pakistani Army's use of waterways as supply routes, Das and other members of the group launched an assault on the Pakistani forces on October 16, 1971, cutting the military's supply lines. A bounty was subsequently placed on Das' head.

== Death ==
On November 16, 1971, the Das party was attacked by the Pakistani army and was forced into retreat. Das got cornered and was shot dead in the assault. The Pakistani army and local Razakars retrieved his dead body near the bank of a river and hanged his lifeless body on an electric pillar of the local Ajmiriganj bazar.

== Awards and honours ==
In 1972, he was awarded the Bir Bikrom, the highest gallantry award, by Bangladesh Betar as the first civilian freedom fighter. However, the Bangladeshi government did not award him the medal until two decades later.

== Memoirs ==
Communist activist and novelist Anjali Lahiri wrote a novel named Jagatjoity, which was published in 2003 in Dhaka. Notable theater personality of Bangladesh, Smt. Ruma Modok, also staged a drama in his memory.
