= Mitro Bahini order of battle =

Order of battle

The Indian Army had no standby force ready in 1971 with the specific task of attacking East Pakistan, one of the many reasons why India did not immediately intervene after Pakistan launched Operation Searchlight in March 1971. Indian Army's Eastern Command was tasked with defending the northern and eastern borders and fighting the insurgencies in Nagaland, Mizoram and Naxalites in West Bengal at that time.

Mukti Bahini, aided by the Indian army through Operation Jackpot, led the struggle against the Pakistan Army while the Indian Army readied for intervention. General M. A. G. Osmani, Commander-in-Chief Bangladesh Forces, had divided Mukti Bahini forces into 11 geographical sectors for command and control purpose. Mukti Bahini forces numbered 30,000 regular soldiers (including 3 brigades containing 8 infantry battalions and 3 artillery batteries) and at least 100,000 guerrillas by December 1971.

The Indian Army Eastern Command assembled two existing infantry corps, the IV Corps and the XXXIII Corps, for operations in Bangladesh, and created a new corps (II Corps) besides reorganising the 101 Communication Zone as a combat formation. On 21 November 1971, the Indian and Bangladesh forces were put under a joint command structure India Bangladesh force in the eastern theatre, led by Lieutenant General Jagjit Singh Aurora, and this force came to be known as Mitro Bahini. In addition to 29 battalions of the Border Security Force (BSF), Mukti Bahini guerrillas operating near the border or awaiting deployment in camps inside India were organised into infantry companies and attached to various Indian formations.

== Indian Army Eastern Command ==
HQ: Fort William, Kolkata

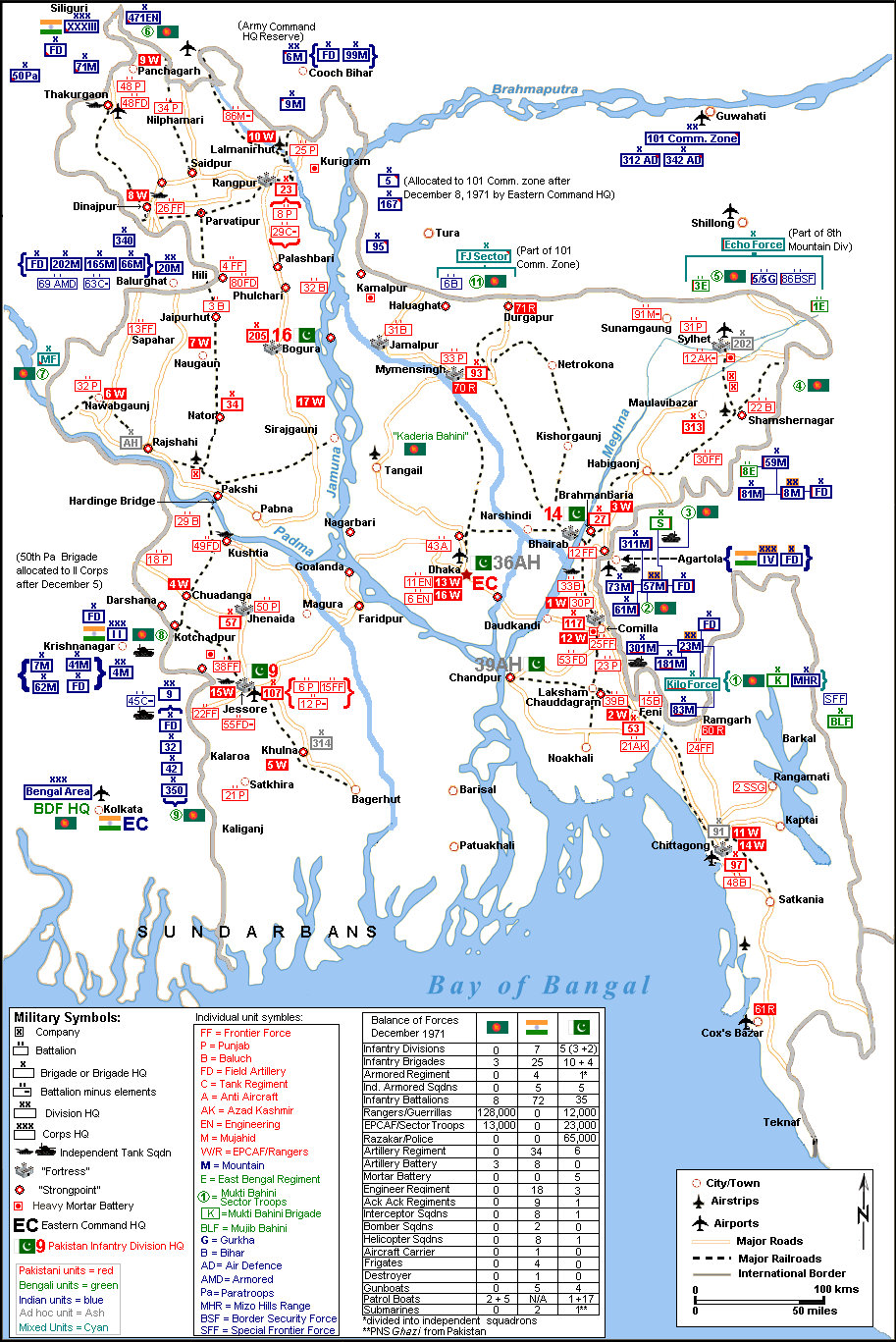
Location of Mitro Bahini and Pakistani units in December 1971. Some unit locations are not shown. Map not to exact scale

GOC-in-C (Indian Army): Lieutenant General Jagjit Singh Aurora
COS: Major General JFR Jacob
Director Military Operations: Major General Inderjit Singh Gill, MC
Director Operation Jackpot: Lieutenant General B.N. 'Jimmy' Sirkar
Bangladesh Forces Liaison: Group Captain A.K. Khandkar,
HQ: 8, Theater Road, Kolkata

Units attached to Eastern Command but outside Bangladesh operational area:
From IV Corps:

- 2nd Infantry Division in North eastern border
- 5th Infantry Division in North eastern border

From XXXIII Corps:

- 17th Mountain division in Sikkim
- 27th Mountain division in Kalimpong, North Bengal

Airborne forces attached to Eastern Command:

- 50th (Independent) Parachute Brigade CO: Brigadier Mathew Thomas
- 2nd battalion Parachute Regiment (2 Para) (in airborne role) CO: Lieutenant Colonel Kulwant Singh Pannu
- 7th battalion Parachute Regiment (7 Para) CO: Lieutenant Colonel RP Singh (KIA)
- 8th battalion Parachute Regiment (8 Para) CO: Lieutenant Colonel Afsir Karim
- 17 Para Field Regiment CO: Lieutenant Colonel Khanna
- 60 Para Medical Company CO: Lieutenant Colonel M Kumar

Eastern Command Reserve:

- 6th Mountain division less brigade HQ: Cooch Bihar GOC: Major General P.C. Reddy
  - 2 Engineer Regiments and bomb disposal group

=== Bengal Area ===
GOC: Major General J.P. Chowdhury HQ: Kolkata

  - 1st battalion 3rd Gurkha Rifles (1/3 GR)
  - 11th battalion Bihar Regiment (11 Bihar)
  - 12th battalion Garhwal Rifles (12 Garh Rif)
  - Engineers and bomb disposal units

== Western Sector ==
Area of Operation: Khulna, Jessore, Kushtia and Faridpur districts

=== II Corps ===
GOC: Lieutenant General T.N. 'Tappy' Raina
HQ: Krishnanagar, West Bengal

- 50th (Independent) Parachute Brigade – Brig M. Thomas, less 2 Para battalion group in airborne role
- 8th Mountain Artillery Brigade
- 58th, 68th and 263rd Engineering Regiments

==== 9th Infantry Division ====
GOC: Major General Dalbir Singh

- 32 Infantry Brigade – Brigadier M Tewari
- 42 Infantry Brigade – Brigadier J. M. Jhoria
- 350 Infantry Brigade – Brigadier H. S. Sandhu
- 9th Artillery Brigade
  - 45th Cavalry (PT-76s)
  - 102nd Engineer Regiment
- Mukti Bahini Sector #9 – Major Jalil

==== 4th Mountain Division ====
GOC: Major General M.S. Barar
HQ: Krishnanagar

- 7th Mountain Brigade – Brigadier Zail Singh
- 41st Mountain Brigade – Brigadier Tony Michigan
- 62nd Mountain Brigade - Brigadier Rajinder Nath
- 4th Mountain Artillery Brigade
- Mukti Bahini Sector #8 – Lieutenant Colonel M.A. Manzoor

== North Western Sector ==
Area of Operation: Rajshahi, Bogra, Dinajpur and Rangpur districts

=== Corps: XXXIII ===
GOC: Lieutenant General M. L. Thapan
HQ: Siliguri, West Bengal

- Corps Artillery Brigade
- 471st Engineering Brigade – Colonel Suri
  - 235th Engineering Regiment
- 2 Para battalion Group in airborne role to parachute over Tangail to capture Poongli Bridge on 11 Dec, Bn gp consisting of:
  - A field battery of 17 Para Field Regiment
  - A section of 411 Para Field Company
  - A surgical team of 60 Para Medical Company
- MF Brigade – Brigadier Prem Singh
- Mukti Bahini Sector #7 – Lieutenant Colonel Q.N. Zaman
- 71st Mountain Brigade – Brigadier P. N. Kathpalia
- Mukti Bahini Sector #6 – Wing Commander Mohammad K. Bashar

==== 20th Mountain Division ====
GOC: Maj. Gen. Lachman Singh
HQ: Balurghat, West Bengal

- 66th Mountain Brigade – Brigadier G. S. Sharma
- 165th Mountain Brigade – Brigadier R. S. Pannu
- 202nd Mountain Brigade – Brigadier F. P. Bhatty
- 3rd Armoured Brigade (63rd Cavalry (T-55s) and 69th Armoured Regiment (PT-76s) – Brigadier G. Singh Sidhu
- 20th Mountain Artillery Brigade
  - 13th Engineering Regiment
- 340th Mountain Brigade Group – Brigadier Joginder Singh
  - 97th Mountain Regiment

==== 6th Mountain Division ====
(Eastern Command HQ Reserve) GOC: Major General P. C. Reddy
HQ: Cooch Bihar, West Bengal

- 9th Mountain Brigade – Brigadier Tirit Varma
- 99th Mountain Brigade -
- 6th Mountain Artillery Brigade
  - 51st Engineer Regiment

== North Eastern Sector ==
Area of Operation: Mymensingh and Tangail districts

=== 101st Communication Zone ===
GOC: Major General Gurbax Singh Gil
HQ: Guwahati, Assam

- 312 Air Defence Brigade
- 342 Independent Air Defence Brigade
  - 56th Mountain Regiment plus Engineers
- 95th Mountain Brigade – Brigadier Hardev Singh Kler
- FJ Sector Brigade – Brigadier Sant Singh
- Mukti Bahini Sector #11 – Lieutenant Colonel Abu Taher
- 167th Infantry Brigade – Brigadier Irani (allotted after 8 December 1971)
- 5th Mountain Brigade (allotted after 8 December 1971)

== Eastern Sector ==
Area of Operation: Sylhet, Comilla, Noakhali & Chittagong districts

=== IV Corps ===
GOC Lieutenant General Sagat Singh
HQ: Agartala, Tripura

- IV Corps Artillery Brigade
- Three Independent Tank Squadrons
  - 4th, 62nd, 234th Engineer Regiments and support elements

==== 8th Mountain Division ====
GOC: Major General K. V. Krishna Rao

- Echo Force Brigade – Brigadier Wadeker
- Mukti Bahini Sector #5 – Major Mir Shawkat Ali
- 59th Mountain Brigade – Brigadier C. A. Quinn
- 81st Mountain Brigade – Brigadier R. C. V. Apte
- 2nd Mountain Artillery Brigade
- Mukti Bahini Sector #4 – Lieutenant Colonel C.R. Dutta

==== 57th Mountain Division ====
GOC: Major General B.F. Gonsalves

- Mukti Bahini S Force Brigade – Lieutenant Colonel K.M. Shafiullah
- 311th Mountain Brigade – Brigadier Mishra
- 73rd Mountain Brigade – Brigadier Tuli
- 61st Mountain Brigade – Brigadier Tom Pande
- 57th Mountain Artillery Brigade
- Mukti Bahini Sector #3 – Maj. A. N. Nuruzzaman
- Mukti Bahini Sector #2 – Maj. A.T.M Haider
  - 15th Engineering Regiment

==== 23rd Mountain Division ====
GOC: Major General R.D. Hira

- 301st Mountain Brigade – Brigadier H. S. Sodhi
- 181st Mountain Brigade – Brigadier Y. C. Bakshi
- 83rd Mountain Brigade – Brigadier B. S. Sandhu
- 23rd Mountain Artillery Brigade
- Kilo Force Brigade – Brigadier Ananda Swaroop containing:
  - Mukti Bahini Sector #1 – Major Rafiqul Islam
  - Mukti Bahini K Force Brigade – Major Salek Chowdhury
  - Mizo Range Hills Brigade

== Indian Navy Eastern Fleet ==
FOC-in-C: Vice Admiral Nilakanta Krishnan
HQ: Vishakhapatnam, Andhra Pradesh
FOCEF: Rear Admiral S. H. Sarma
A liaison officer from the Navy was posted at Fort William to coordinate matters with the Army Eastern Command. The fleet was at its peacetime standing when radio intercepts warned of PNS Ghazi entering the Bay of Bengal. INS Vikrant and part of the Eastern Fleet was moved to the Andamans as a result.

- INS Vikrant – Captain Swaraj Parkash (Majestic-class light aircraft carrier)
- INS Brahmaputra – Captain J.C. Puri (Leopard-class frigate)
- INS Beas – Captain L. Ramdas (Leopard-class frigatee)
- INS Kamorta – Captain M.P. Awati (Petya-class frigate)
- INS Kavaratti - Captain S. Paul (Petya-class frigate)
- INS Rajput – Lieutenant Commander Inder Singh (destroyer)
- INS Kalvari – (submarine)
- INS Khandari – Commander R. J. Milan (submarine)
- INS Panvel – Lieutenant Commander G.R. Naroha (gunboat)
- INS Pulikat – Lieutenant Commander S. Krishnnan (gunboat)
- INS Panaji – Lieutenant Commander R. Gupta (gunboat)
- INS Akshay – Lieutenant Commander S.D. Moore (gunboat)
- INS Guldar – Lieutenant Commander U. Dabir (landing ship)
- INS Gharial – Lieutenant Commander A.K. Sharma (landing ship)
- INS Maggar – Lieutenant Commander A.T.N. Singhal (landing ship)

=== Bangladesh Navy ===
Two gunboats under Indian officers and crewed by Bengali seamen were engaged in Operation Hotpants prior to 3 December 1971, harassing merchant traffic to East Pakistan and laying mines on the waterways. After 6 December, when the Indian government recognised Bangladesh as a sovereign nation, the crew wore uniforms of their respective organisations.
Squadron CO: Commander M.N.R. Samant (On deputation from Indian Navy)

  - BNS Palash – Lieutenant Commander J.K. Rai Chowdhury (Indian Navy) (gunboat)
  - BNS Padma – Lieutenant S.K. Mitter (On deputation from Indian Navy) (gunboat)

== Indian Air Force Eastern Air Command ==
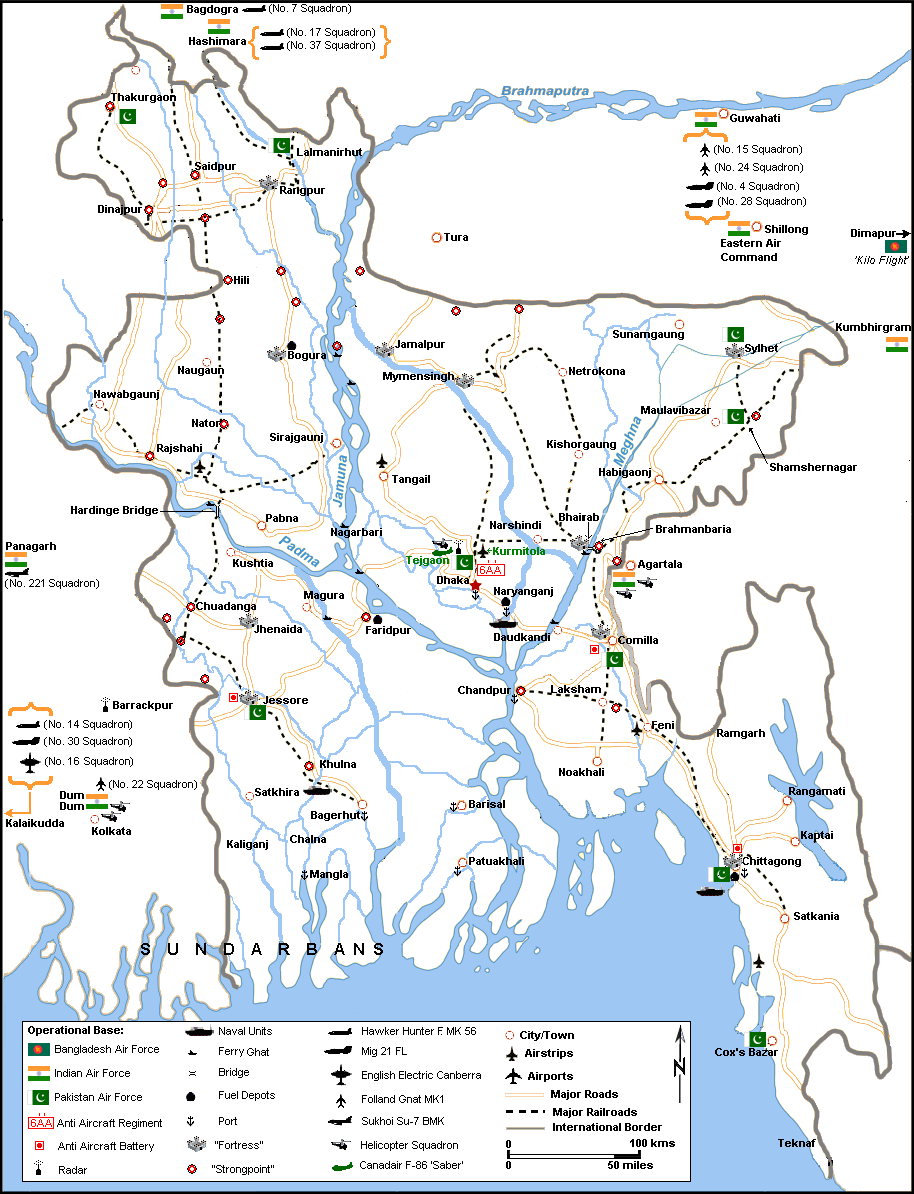
Location of Mitro Bahini and Pakistani units in December 1971. Some unit locations are not shown. Map not to exact scale

AOC-in-C: Air Marshal H. C. Dewan, Temporary advanced HQ at Fort William
Prior to 1971, Indian Air Force had two command centers dealing with the East, Eastern Air Command (HQ Shillong) responsible for the North Eastern Border, and the Central Air Command (HQ Allahabad), looking after areas south of the Ganges river. Air Chief Marshal Pratap Chandra Lal formed an advance HQ at Fort William after consultation with Major General Jacob to coordinate operations with the army before the start of the war.

Western Sector:

- No. 7 Squadron IAF (Battle Axes): Hawker Hunter F. MK 56 and 2 F. MK 1 - Bagdogra (WC Ceolho, then WC Suri). The squadron was moved Chamb after 12 December.
- No. 14 Squadron IAF (Bulls): Hawker Hunter F. MK 56 - Kalaikudda (WC Sundersan) - Fighter
- No. 16 Squadron IAF (Rattlers): Canberra - Kalaikudda - (WC Gautum) - Bomber
- No. 22 Squadron IAF (Swifts): Folland Gnat MK 1 Dum Dum, then Kalaikudda, then Calcutta (WC Sikand)
- No. 30 Squadron IAF (Charging Rhinos): Mig 21 FL - Kalaikudda (WC Chudda) - Interceptor
- No. 221 Squadron IAF (Valiants): Su-7 BMK - Panagarh (WC Sridharan) – Fighter/Bomber
- No. 104 Helicopter Squadron, IAF (Alluitte 3) and (Mi-4) Helicopter

North East and North Western Sector: AOC-in-C: Air Vice Marshal Devasher HQ: Shillong

- No. 4 Squadron IAF (Oorials): Mig 21 FL - Gauhati (Wing Commander JV Gole)
- No. 15 Squadron IAF (Flying Lancers): Folland Gnat - Gauhati then Agortala (WC Singh)
- No. 17 Squadron IAF (Golden Arrows): Hawker Hunter F MK 56 - Hashimara (WC Chatrath)
- No. 37 Squadron IAF (Black Panthers): Hawker Hunter F MK 10 - Hashimara (WC Kaul)
- No. 24 Squadron IAF (Hunting Hawks): Folland Gnat Gauhati (WC Bhadwar)
- No. 28 Squadron IAF (First Supersonics): Mig 21FL Gauhati (WC Bishnu)
- No. 105 Helicopter Unit, IAF (Mi-4) and No. 121 Helicopter Flight, IAF (Alouette III) - Agartala

=== Bangladesh Air Force: Kilo Flight ===
CO: Flight Lieutenant Sultan Mahmud HQ: Dimapur, Nagaland, then Agartala
This unit was formed by Bengali pilots and technicians defecting from the Pakistan Air Force. Flying light aircraft donated by India, they launched attacks on depots and communication lines on 2 December 1971, before the start of the war. The unit relocated to Agartala and then Shamshernagar after 3 December 1971.

== See also ==
- Pakistan Army order of battle, December 1971
- Evolution of Pakistan Eastern Command plan
- Military plans of the Bangladesh Liberation War
- Timeline of the Bangladesh Liberation War
- Indo-Pakistani wars and conflicts

== Sources ==
- Salik, Siddiq (1997). Witness to Surrender. ISBN 984-05-1374-5.
- Jacob, Lt. Gen. JFR (2004). Surrender at Dacca: Birth of A Nation. The University Press Limited. ISBN 984-05-1532-2.
- Qureshi, Maj. Gen. Hakeem Arshad (2003). The Indo Pak War of 1971: A Soldiers Narrative. Oxford University Press. ISBN 0-19-579778-7.
- Islam, Major Rafiqul (2006). A Tale of Millions. Ananna. ISBN 984-412-033-0.
