= Daudkandi =

- Town
- Map showing Daudkandi town in Bangladesh
- Coordinates: 23.529484°N 90.729523°E
- Country: Bangladesh
- Division: Comilla
- Upazila: Daudkandi
- Urban area: 1995

Government
  - Type: Municipality
  - Mayor: Mizanur Rahman

Area
  - Total: 16.64 km^{2} (6.42 sq mi)

Population (2011)
  - Total: 38,317
  - Density: 2,303/km^{2} (5,964/sq mi)
- Time zone: UTC+6 (Bangladesh Standard Time)

Daudkandi Municipality mahallah geocode map

Daudkandi is a town located in the Comilla district, which falls under the Chittagong Division in the southern region of Bangladesh. Administratively, the town serves as the headquarters of the Daudkandi Upazila. It is the largest urban area in Daudkandi Upazila.

== Population ==
According to the 2011 Bangladesh Census, the total population of Daudkandi town is 46,256, of which 22,887 are male and 23,369 are female. The town has a total of 9,400 households.

== Geography ==
The latitude and longitude of the town are 23.529484°N 90.729523°E. The average elevation of the town above sea level is 8.11 meters.
