= Military plans of the Bangladesh Liberation War =

Prior to Bangladesh Liberation War in 1971, India had no plans for large scale military action in East Pakistan. Since the Sino-Indian War of 1962, the primary objective of the Indian Army Eastern Command was the defence of the Indian northern and eastern borders, defending the "Shiliguri Corridor", and on combating insurgencies raging in Mizoram, Nagaland, Manipur and the Naxalites in West Bengal.

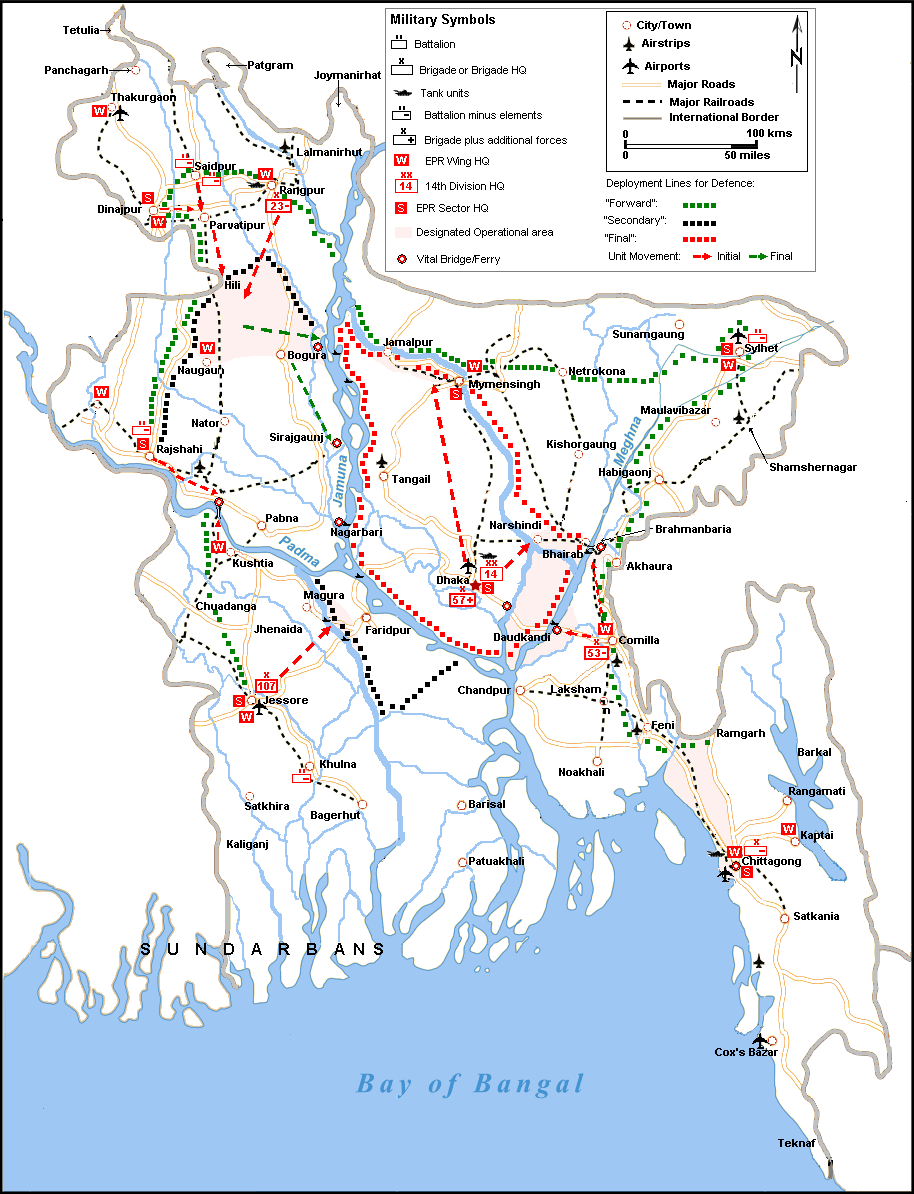
Pakistani Eastern Command plan for the defence of East Pakistan between 1967 and 1971. A generic representation, some unit locations are not shown.

Since 1948, bulk of the Pakistan Armed Forces were stationed in West Pakistan and the strategic role of the forces in East Pakistan was to hold out until Pakistan defeated India in the west. The Pakistan Army Eastern Command had planned to defend Dhaka until the last by ultimately concentrating their forces along the "Dhaka Bowl", the area surrounded by the rivers Jamuna, Padma and Meghna.

== Indian Eastern Command deployments 1971 ==
The Indian Army kept parity with Pakistani forces stationed in East Pakistan since 1965, and in 1971 one armoured brigade and one infantry division was deployed in West Bengal. Other Eastern Command units were deployed in Mizoram, Manipur, and Nagaland. Eastern command had 4 administrative units: the Bengal Area corps (the 9th division and other units), the XXXIII corps (3rd armoured brigade, 17th, 27th, 6th and 20th Mountain divisions) guarding the Shiliguri corridor, as well as ensuring security of Sikkim and Bhutan if needed, the 101st Communication Zone (no combat units, an administrative unit which operated in the area between the XXXIII and IV corps), while the IV corps (2nd, 5th, 23rd, 57th and 8th Mountain divisions) ensured the security of Assam, Arunachal, Monipur, Mizoram, Tripura and Nagaland.

=== April 1971: Indian Intervention in Bangladesh ===
Maj. Gen. Rao Farman Ali and Lt. Gen. Sahabzada Yaqub Khan had expected that military action against Bengali civilians would result in Indian intervention, which the Pakistan army was woefully unprepared to meet in March 1971. The 14th infantry division with its brigades posted at Comilla (53rd), Dhaka (57th), Rangpur (23rd) and Jessore (107th) was the only Pakistani unit in East Pakistan prior to March 1971. The issue of direct military intervention was discussed between the Indian military and political leadership in April 1971. Although some Indian officers expected early intervention, Indian army command decided against immediate intervention, and concluded that a full attack could only take place after 15 November at the earliest, and only after deliberate and extensive preparations. The Indian Army Eastern Command took over responsibility for East Pakistan operations on 29 April, and on 15 May launched Operation Jackpot, a full-fledged operation to arm, train, equip, supply and advise the Mukti Bahini fighters engaged in guerrilla warfare against the Pakistan armed forces.

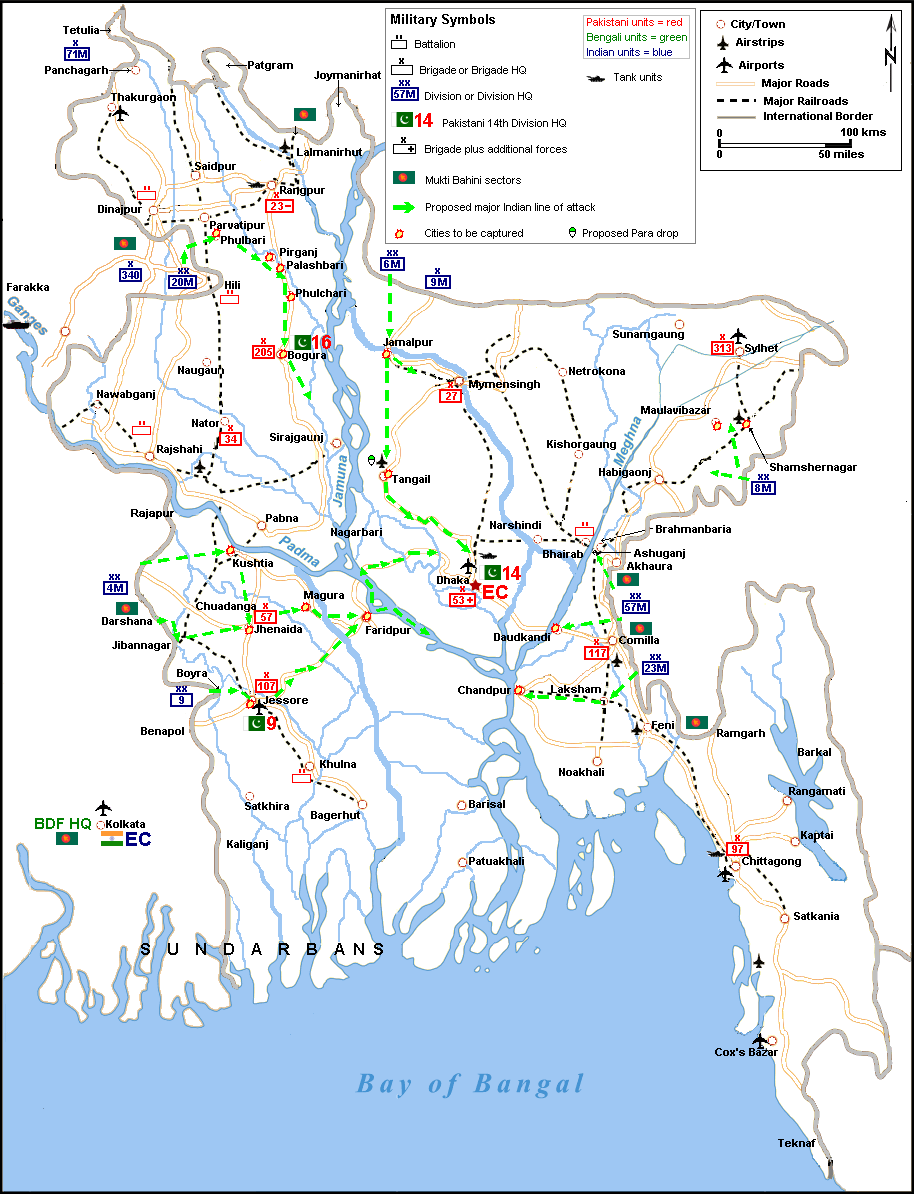
Indian Eastern Command draft plan of operations in Bangladesh in May 1971. A generic representation, some unit locations are not shown.

== Indian Army Eastern Command draft plan: May 1971 ==
Indian Eastern Command began drafting an operational plan for military action in Bangladesh from May 1971. Indian planners assumed that Pakistani army would try to defend the whole of the province to prevent Mukti Bahini from establishing the government inside Bangladesh. The main objectives of the May draft plan were:

- The capture of Dhaka was the final goal.
- A winter campaign would reduce the chance of Chinese intervention as passes over the Himalayas would be snowed shut and the ground in Bangladesh would be firm and most favourable for armour and mechanised movements. Some troops deployed on the Chinese border can be used in Bangladesh.
- October – April period was the best time to launch an offensive, while the Monsoon rains (May – September) turned the country into a morass.
- Axis of advance should aim to isolate and bypass Pakistani forces – which meant a minimum superiority in numbers was needed. Fortified positions should be bypassed.
- Subsidiary objectives should be picked to occupy communication centres and destroy Pakistani command and control ability.
- Preliminary operations (by Mukti Bahini and then Indian forces) should aim to draw the Pakistani forces near the border, so key areas in the interior are left undefended.

=== Proposed axis of advance ===
Eastern Command had concluded that The major rivers divided Bangladesh into 4 sectors:

North – Western Sector (Pakistani designation Northern Sector): The area north of the Padma and west of the Jamuna river. Bogra was the main communication hub and the sector is connected to the western sector through the Hardinge Bridge. The Shiliguri corridor, which is vital for road and rail communication with Eastern India, borders the northern tip of this sector.

A division size attack along the Hili – Gaibandha axis, expected to be heavily defended, aimed to capture Bogra. Later an alternative road was identified, and it was decided to launch a secondary attack on Hili while the main attack bypassed Hili, along the Parvatipur – Phulbari – Pirganj – Palashbari – Bogra axis. Two brigade groups were to operate from Shiliguri area and from Cooch Bihar as needed.

Western Sector (Pakistani designation Western Sector): This area lies south of the Padma and west of the Meghna. The main communication hub is Jessore, along with Jhenaidah and Magura, and Khulna is a vital sea port. From Jessore a road runs east to Faridpur, and via ferry it is possible to approach Dhaka.

Two divisions were to attack along the Boyra – Garibpur – Jessore and Darshana – Kotchadpur – Jhenaidah axis. The natural thrust lines along the Benapol – Jessore and Meherpur – Chuadanga – Jhenaidah, were expected to be heavily defended and was not considered. An infantry brigade was to move along Murshidabad – Kushtia line, capture the Hardinge bridge, then move south to Jhenaidah. Then the whole force would move towards Magura, cross the Madhumati and capture Faridpur. With the help of the Inland Waterways Flotilla, an assault towards Dhaka across the Padma would be launched.

North Eastern Sector (Pakistani designation Dhaka Bowl): This area sits to the east of river Jamuna, north of Padma and west of the Meghna and contains the city of Dhaka. A branch of the Jamuna flows to the north of Dhaka between the Jamuna to the Meghna rivers, while a rail bridge at Bhairab connects this area with the south eastern sector.

A division would advance along the Kamalpur – Jamalpur –Tangail – Dhaka axis. An additional brigade would support the advance while a Para battalion could be airdropped to Tangail to cut off Pakistani forces.

South Eastern Sector (Pakistani designation Eastern Sector): This lies to the east of Meghna, contains Sylhet, Comilla and the main seaport Chittagong. Control over Ashuganj, Chandpur and Daudkandi was vital to approach Dhaka.

3 divisions were to secure the area between Ashuganj and Chandpur, then if possible approach Dhaka by crossing the Meghna using helicopters or ferry – whichever was available. Indian Navy would blockade Chittagong.

Mukti Bahini support was expected in all phases of the operation.

==== Proposed Force allotment ====
Indian Army HQ initially allocated the 9th infantry division, 4th Mountain division, the 50th Para Brigade (army HQ reserve), and the 340th brigade group for operations in the east alongside whatever forces Indian Eastern Command could assemble. Eastern command proposed the following allocation of forces:

1. The XXXIII corps would guard the Shiliguri corridor with the 71 Mountain brigade, which could also move against the North Western Sector, while the 20th Mountain division and the 340th brigade would bear the brunt of the fighting. The 3rd armoured brigade can also be employed as needed.

2. The IV corps (8th, 57th and 23rd mountain divisions) would be responsible for the South Eastern Sector, while a rear HQ looked after Assam, Mizoram, Nagaland and the Chinese border.

3.A new corps (4th Mountain and 9th divisions) was slated for the Western Sector operations.

4. The 6th Mountain (part of Army HQ reserve designated for operations in Bhutan against Chinese moves) and the 9th Mountain brigade would be used in the North Eastern Sector.

Seven divisions, 3 independent brigade groups, one armoured brigade and the Mukti Bahini was earmarked for the draft plan, which was shared with the DMO, Lt. Gen. K.K. Singh. During May – November, while Mukti Bahini engaged Pakistani forces, Eastern Command, having never contemplated or anticipated large scale military action against East Pakistan began building up logistical infrastructure while army support services (Engineer, Ordnance and Medical) began to build up capacity to sustain a 4 week long campaign.

== Mukti Bahini plan: July 1971 ==
General M.A.G. Osmani (Commander in Chief Bangladesh Forces) had differences of opinion with the Indian leadership regarding the role of the Mukti Bahini in the conflict. Indian leadership initially envisioned Bengali forces to be trained into a small elite guerrilla force of 8,000 members led by the surviving East Bengal Regiment soldiers operating in small cells around Bangladesh to facilitate the eventual Indian intervention, but the Bangladesh Government in exile and General Osmani favoured the following strategy:

1.Bengali conventional force would occupy lodgment areas inside Bangladesh and then Bangladesh government would request international diplomatic recognition and intervention. Initially Mymensingh was picked for this operation, but Gen. Osmani later settled on Sylhet.

2.Sending the maximum number to guerrillas inside Bangladesh as soon as possible with the following objectives:

- Increasing Pakistani casualties through raids and ambush
- Cripple economic activity by hitting power stations, railway lines, storage depots and communication networks.
- Destroy Pakistan army mobility by blowing up bridges/culverts, fuel depots, trains and river crafts.
- The strategic objective is to make the Pakistanis to spread their forces inside the province, so attacks can be made on isolated Pakistani detachments.

Bangladesh was divided into Eleven sectors in July while 3 brigades (8 infantry battalions and 3 artillery batteries) were put into action between July – September. During June –July, Mukti Bahini had regrouped across the border with Indian aid through Operation Jackpot and began sending 2000 – 5000 guerrillas across the border, the so-called Monsoon Offensive, which for various reasons (lack of proper training, supply shortage, lack of a proper support network inside Bangladesh etc.) failed to achieve its objectives. Bengali regular forces also attacked BOPs in Mymensingh, Comilla and Sylhet, but the results were mixed. Pakistani authorities concluded that they had successfully contained the Monsoon Offensive, and they were not far from the truth.

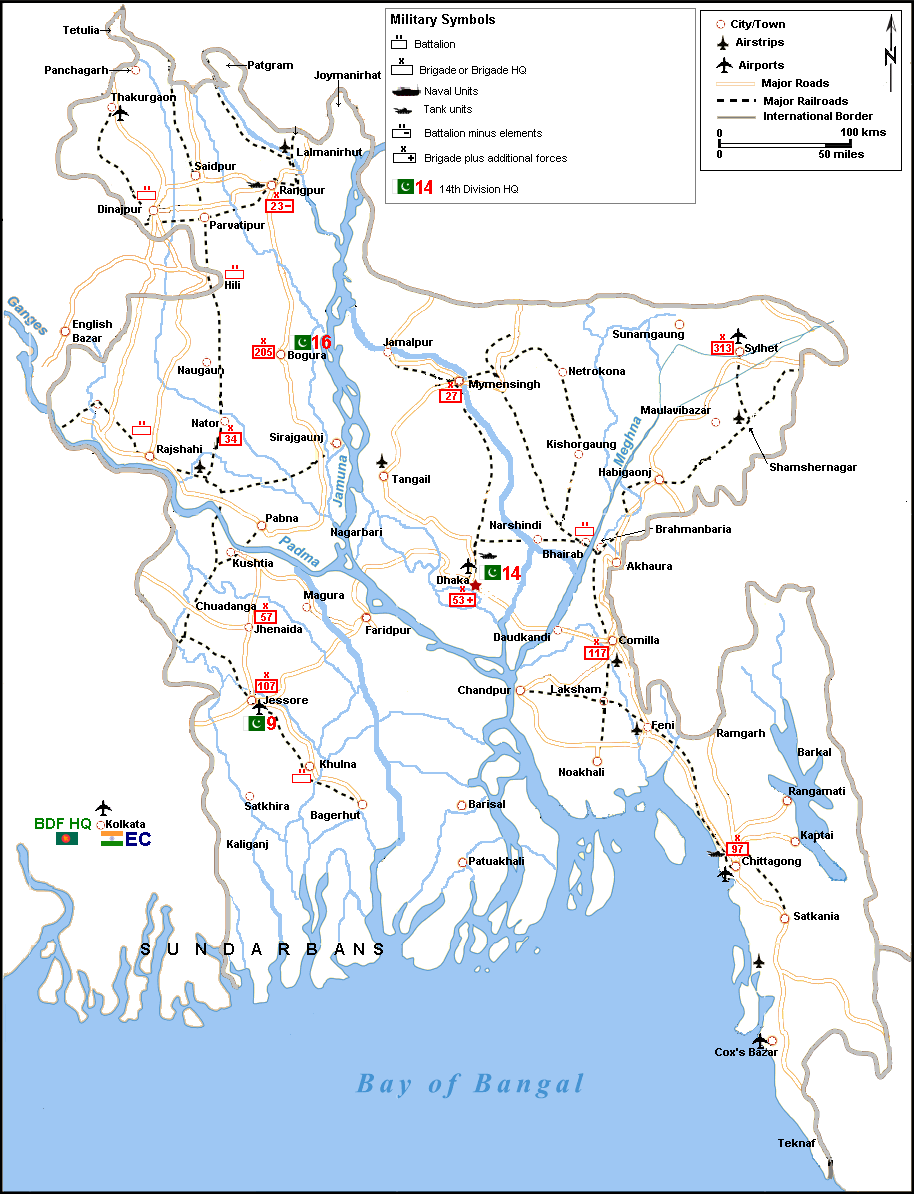
Pakistani deployment in May 1971 after the reorganisation of Eastern Command forces in the aftermath of Operation Searchlight. A generic representation, some unit locations are not shown.

== Pakistani defence plan: June 1971 ==
Pakistan Army Eastern Command, after being reinforced by the 9th and 16th divisions in April 1971, moved the 9th division HQ (CO Maj. Gen. Shawkat Riza) to Jessore, putting the 107th (CO Brig. Makhdum Hayat, HQ Jessore) and the 57th (CO Brig. Jahanzab Arbab, HQ Jhenida) under this division. The 16th Division (CO Maj. Gen. Nazar Hussain Shah) HQ moved to Bogra, the 23rd (CO Brig. Abdullah Malik, HQ Rangpur), the 205th (HQ Bogra) and the 34th (HQ Nator) brigades were attached to it. The 14th division (CO Maj. Gen. Rahim) HQ stayed at Dhaka, its brigades were at Mymensingh (27th), Sylhet (313th ) and Comilla (117th). The 97th independent brigade was formed in Chittagong while the 53rd brigade was moved to Dhaka as command reserve. By mid June Pakistan army had occupied all the towns and fortified 90 of the 370 BoPs (half of the BoPs were destroyed by Indian shellfire by July 1971 to facilitate Mukti Bahini infiltration) and deployed in all the sensitive towns, while the other Para military units were deployed around the country to maintain internal security. From their bases the army conducted sweep and clearing operations in the neighbouring areas to wipe out insurgents and their supporters. Pakistani forces relied on sudden barrages at selected areas to interdict Mukti Bahini infiltration. Pakistanis also build up an intelligence network to collect information on Mukti Bahini activity and sent informers across the border to give early warning of Mukti Bahini activity.

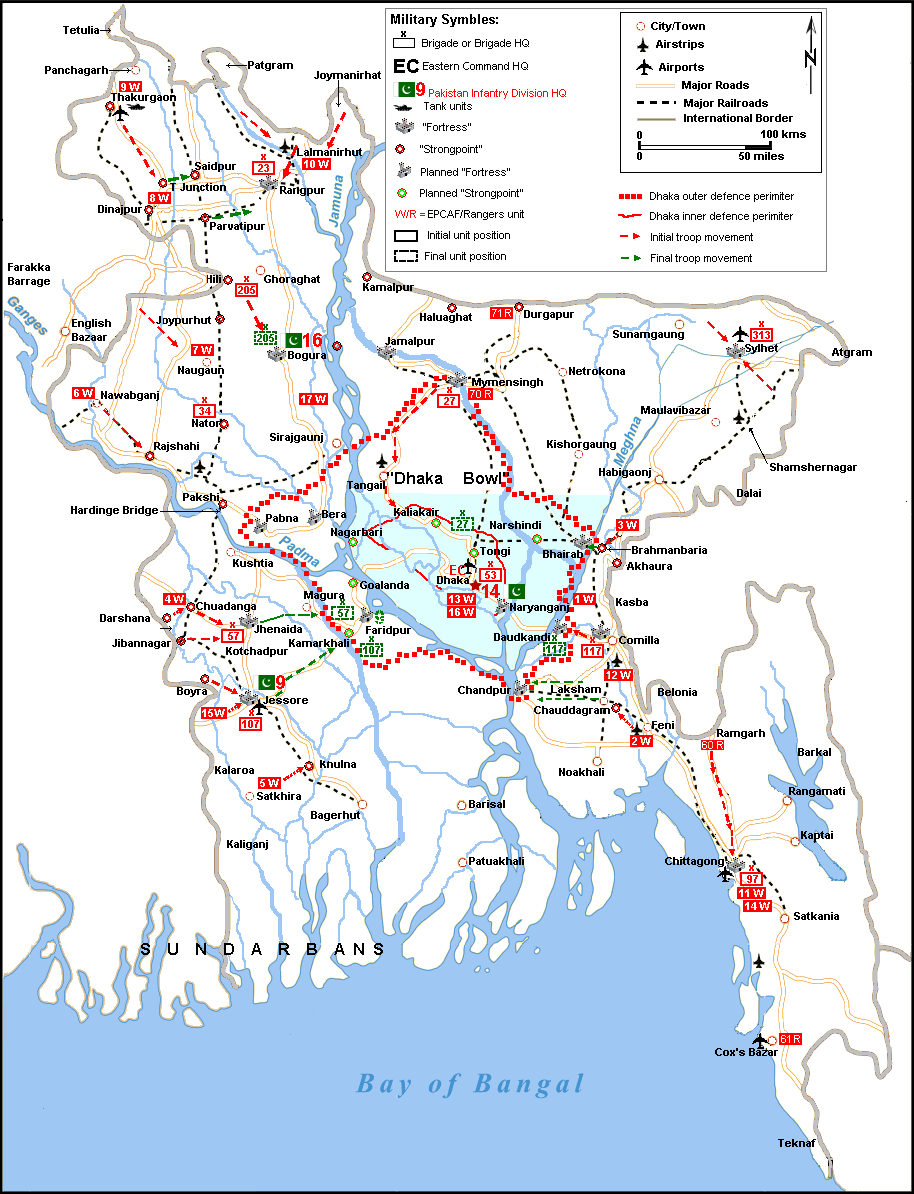
Pakistani deployment and plan of defence in August 1971 after Eastern Command assessment in the aftermath of Operation Searchlight. A generic representation, some unit locations are not shown.

=== Review of June 1971 ===
Pakistan Eastern Command had run Operation X-Sunderbans in 1967 and Operation Titumir in 1970 to formulate the defence plan for East Pakistan, which basically was:

- According to the Pakistani war doctrine, the defence of the east lies in the west, the primary objective of Pakistani forces was to hold out until Pakistan had defeated India in the west. Against a conventional Indian attack with 3:1 superiority in numbers and enemy dominance of the air and sea, Pakistani forces in Bangladesh would probably be able to last for a maximum of 3 weeks.
- Don't try to defend the entire province. Troops should not be deployed along the border or along the "Forward line" (running north from Jessore-Rajshahi-Dinajpur-Saidpur-Rangpur, then east to Jamalpur-Mymensingh-Sylhet, then south to Comilla-Chittagong).
- Priority should be given to defend the "Dhaka Bowl" (North–Eastern Sector to the Indians) in general and the city of Dhaka should be held at all costs.

Brig. Gulam Jilani (later DG ISI), COS to Gen. Niazi, reviewed the existing East Pakistan defence plan in June 1971 in light of the prevailing circumstances and left the plan basically unchanged. The following assumptions were made while re-evaluating the plan:

- The main Indian thrust would come from the east, not the west as assumed in the earlier plan. Indian army would attack to take control over the area between Sylhet – Chandpur, while a secondary attack would be aimed at Rangpur – Bogra and at Mymensingh. At least 5 Indian infantry divisions, supported by an armoured brigade would launch the attack. The main objective of the Indian attack was to occupy as much territory as possible to set up the Bangladesh government in exile inside the province.
- Indians would take the initiative to start the war. By this time, the insurgency situation would have improved and Eastern Command would be ready for both internal and external threats. If not, internal security measures have to be taken to contain the insurgency.
- All communication links would be fully functional and under government control to facilitate the movement of troops according to the plan.

Conceptually the new plan was the same as the old one, Pakistani units were to fight a series of defensive battles in their deployment areas before taking position to defend the Dhaka Bowl, every inch of the province would not be defended. Gen. Niazi added the following to plan:

- Pakistani army to launch attacks towards Tripura, Calcutta or the Shiliguri corridor if needed.
- Take over as much Indian territory if possible when opportunity arises.

No wargames were conducted to factor in the new directives or specific plans were drawn up to attain these objectives. The revised plan was sent to Rawalpindi and approved in August 1971. Pakistan army probably enjoyed their most peaceful period during the occupation of Bangladesh in 1971 between Late May and mid July, when Mukti Bahini was reorganising and the Indian army was implementing Operation Jackpot in their support.

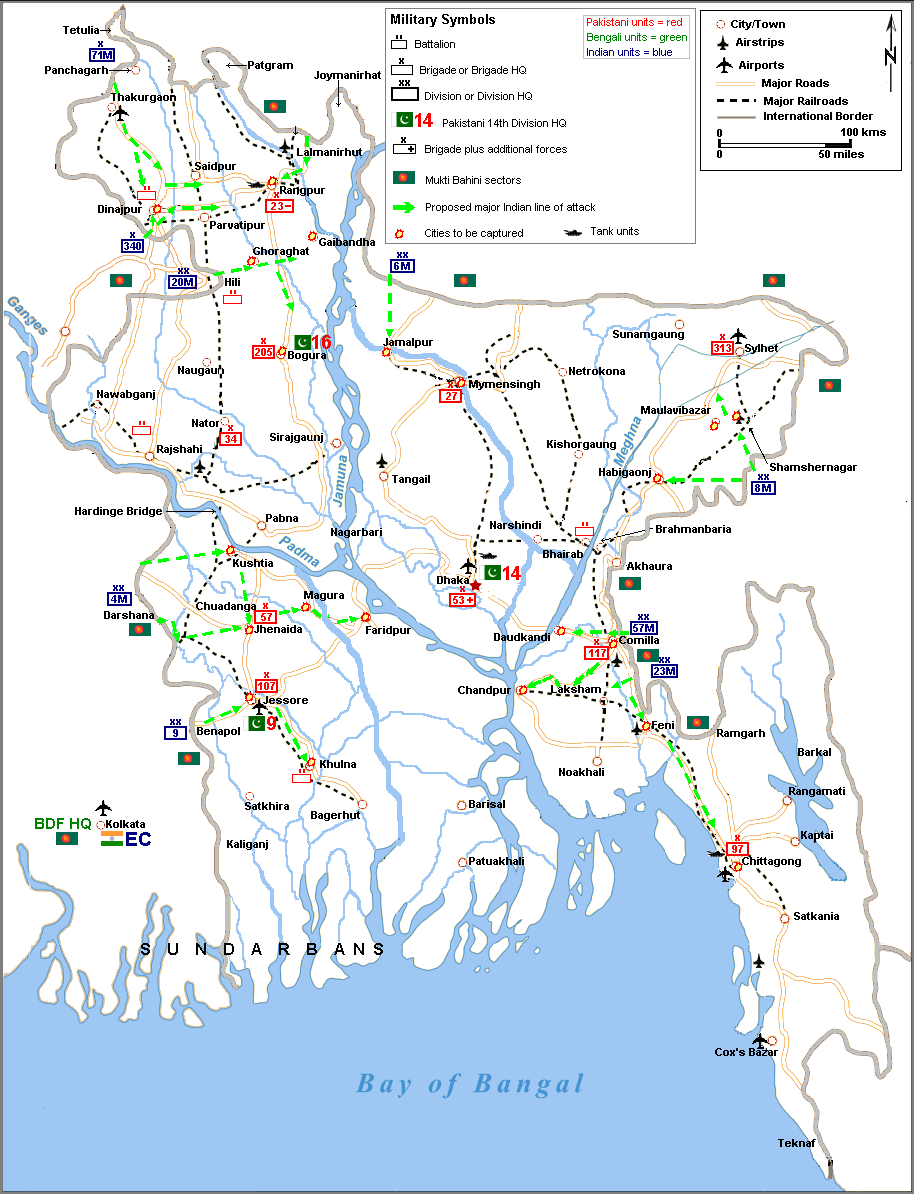
Indian Army High Command plan of operations in Bangladesh in August 1971. A generic representation, some unit locations are not shown.

== Indian Army HQ Plan: August 1971 ==
The draft plan of Lt. Gen K.K Singh, DMO of Indian army was presented to Eastern Command in August 1971. The strategic assumptions and objectives of this plan were as follows:

- India can only assemble the 7/8 divisions needed for a successful operation in Bangladesh during winter, when the Chinese army would be immobilised. The expected Chinese response would probably occur in the Chumbi valley in Sikkim north of the Shiliguri corridor – which would pin down Indian forces away from Bangladesh.
- Priority should be given to strike/occupy airports, port, ferries, and bridges to isolate Pakistani units from one another, then occupy communication hubs to neutralise the mobility of Pakistani units.
- Maximum destruction of Pakistani forces and occupation of territory was the primary objectives.
- As soon as feasible – move to quickly occupy Dhaka.

However, Gen. K.K. Singh did not think it was feasible to occupy Dhaka with the forces available or within 21 days, the time span envisioned to complete all operations in Bangladesh. The gist of the DMO Plan, presented to Eastern Command in August 1971, was:

North – Western Sector: The XXXIII corps (OC Lt. Gen. Thapan) would launch the 20th division attack along the Hili – Ghoraghat –Gaibandha axis to cut the area in two. The 71st brigade group would launch an attack along the Thakurgaon – Dinajpur axis along both banks of the Atrai River, while another brigade attacked along the Lalmunirhut – Rangpur axis. After reaching Gaibandha, a group from the 20th division would move south towards Bogra, while the 71st and 20th occupied Dinajpur, Saidpur and Rangpur.

Western Sector: The newly created II corps (OC Lt. Gen. Tappy Raina) would launch the 4th Mountain and the 9th infantry divisions along the Darshana – Jibannagar – Jhenaidah and the Benapol – Jessore axis against Pakistani 9th division. A group from the 4th mountain would move along Meherpur –Kushtia axis to occupy Hardinge bridge, then move to Jhenaidah. From Jhenaidah the 4th Mountain would move east to Magura, while the 9th moved south to occupy Khulna.

North Eastern Sector: The 101st Communication zone would move a division along the Kamalpur – Jamalpur –Tangail – Dhaka axis and take control of the area north of the Brahmaputra river. No troops were allocated for operations against Dhaka.

South Eastern Sector: The IV corps (OC Lt. Gen. Sagat Singh) would attack with 3 divisions. The 8th Mountain would move along the Shamshernagar – Moulvibazar axis, and contain Sylhet. The 57th Mountain would capture Comilla and then occupy the area between Chandpur and Daudkandi. The 23rd would occupy the Feni –Laksham area then moves south to capture Chittagong.

Gen. Sam Manekshaw, Lt. Gen. Jagjit Singh Aurora (OC eastern Command) and Lt. Gen. K.K. Singh all held the opinion that with the fall of Khulna and Chittagong, the primary seaports, Pakistani forces isolated inside the Dhaka bowl would capitulate. Lt. Gen. Jacob, COS Eastern Command disagreed and insisted that forces for the capture of Dhaka should be allocated while the Indian Eastern Fleet, vastly superior in numbers, could easily blockade the ports. Gen. Jacob was over-ruled.

The DMO had assumed that India did not have adequate forces to liberate Dhaka within the allotted time span, so the objective was to liberate the maximum amount of territory. Since this plan did not assume India attacking with a 3:1 advantage in numbers against the assumed 4 Pakistani infantry divisions in Bangladesh, Gen. K.K Singh envisioned the Mukti Bahini helping to fill the gap in strength as follows:

- Decrease the combat capability of the Pakistani army in Bangladesh, by inflicting casualties, sabotaging installations, disrupting logistics, and decreasing morale and increasing combat fatigue by increasing Mukti Bahini activity along the Indian border and inside the country.
- *Take up the responsibility to operate inside the "Dhaka Bowl" after Indian army had isolated the Pakistani army

Indian army had no authority over Mukti Bahini and could only make suggestions to General Osmani. However, Gen Osmani conducted a review of Mukti Bahini activity in September 1971 and put a new plan in place.

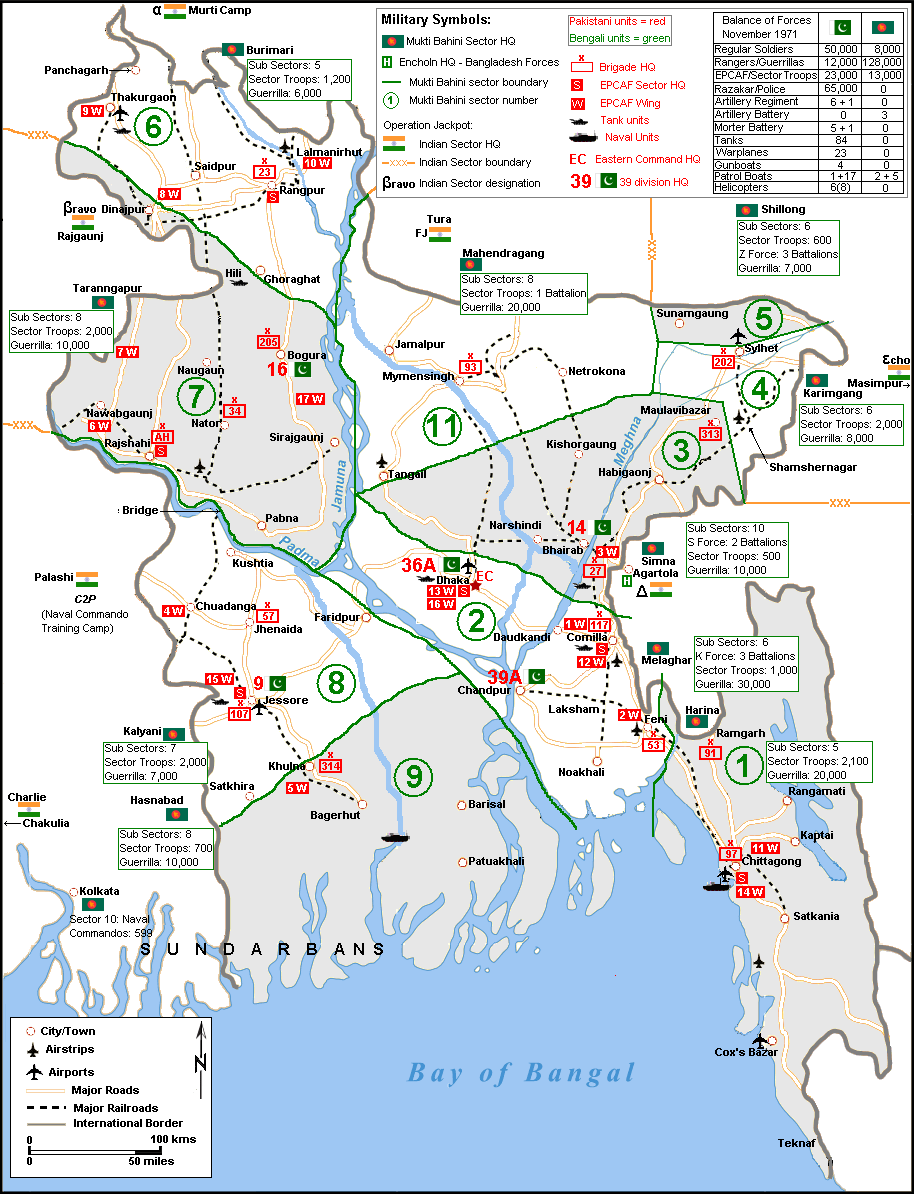
Mukti Bahini operational setup by November 1971. A generic representation, some unit locations are not shown.

=== Mukti Bahini Strategy: September re-evaluation ===
The failure of the so-called Monsoon Offensive brought these facts to light:

- Small number of hastily trained guerrillas inside Bangladesh would require time before becoming an effective force.
- Bangladesh conventional forces had not acquired the needed manpower and training level to create lodgment areas and without Indian intervention would not have the required air and artillery support to hold onto the liberated areas on their own.

General Osmani thought about dismantling the regular battalions operating under Z, K and S forces and sending platoons from these forces to aid the guerrillas in September, but ultimately did not. Bangladesh government in exile decided to send 20,000 trained guerrillas into Bangladesh from September onwards, on the assumption that even if 1/3 of the force succeeded in it' objective, the effect on the Pakistani forces would be devastating.

Indian High Command also stepped up their efforts, beginning from increasing the volume of supplies (arms/ammunition/medicine) in September to having Gen. B.N. Sarkar, DMO Eastern Command and OC Operation Jackpot co-ordinating operations with Bangladesh Forces HQ. Gen Sarkar would draw up monthly objectives for Mukti Bahini after consulting with Bangladesh H, then would send a copy of objectives to Mukti Bahini sector commanders and another to adjacent Indian units, thus eliminating the scope of misunderstanding and increasing the co-operation and co-ordination between the forces and ensuring common objectives were targeted.

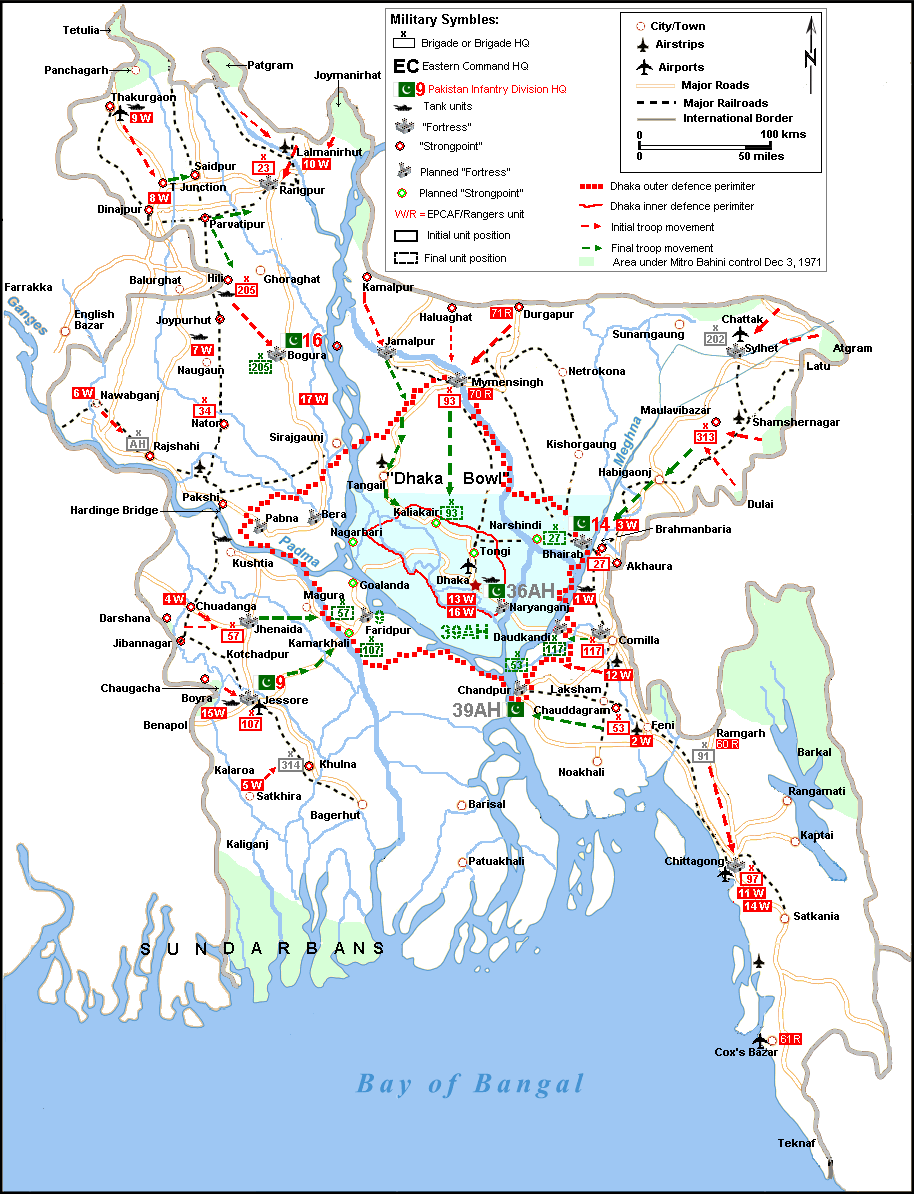
Pakistani deployment and final plan of defence after 19 November 1971 after incorporating Pakistan Army GHQ suggestions. A generic representation, some unit locations are not shown.

== Final Pakistani Plan: September – October 1971 ==
General Niazi, along with General Jamshed (GOC EPCAF), General Rahim ( 2IC Eastern Command), Brig. Bakir (COS Eastern Command), Rear Admiral Sharif and Air Commodore Enam reviewed the existing plan and updated it to factor in the manpower shortage, logistical difficulties, and the directive of the GHQ to defend every inch of East Pakistan. The initial assumptions were:

- Indian army Eastern Command would use 12 infantry/mountain divisions and an armoured brigade for the invasion under 3 corps commands, supported by Mukti Bahini and BSF units.
- Mukti Bahini will step up its activities and try to occupy border areas and if possible occupy a large area of the province adjacent to the border prior to the Indian assault.
- The PAF in East Pakistan would last only 24 hours against the IAF eastern contingent
- The main Indian assault would come from the west (opposite Jessore sector) with a subsidiary attack from the east (opposite Comilla sector).
- The naval detachment would move into the harbours once hostilities commenced.
- Indian strategic objective is to occupy as much of the province as quickly as possible to set up the Bangladesh government and the Mukti Bahini in the liberated area. Full occupation of the province is not the Indian goal.

Gen. Niazi chose the Fortresses concept of defence and the planners decided on a single defensive deployment of troops on the border, which went against the troop deployments advocated by the earlier plans. This was done to stick to the GHQ order of not surrendering any territory to the Mukti Bahini.

=== Defensive lines ===
Once the fortress defence was chosen, General Niazi and his staff designated the following cities as fortresses: Jessore, Jhenida, Bogra, Rangpur, Comilla and Bhairab Bazar (these were located on communication hubs), Jamalpur and Mymensingh (defending the northern perimeter of the Dhaka bowl), and Sylhet and Chittagong (independent defence areas). There were 4 lines of defence:

1. The troops deployed on the border was the forward line – this was way in front of the forward line envisioned in the X-Sunderban exercise of 1967 – which had concluded that it was impossible to defend the entire border against a conventional attack. 2. The Fortresses: All the fortresses were located on this line except Chittagong and Sylhet – which were to be independent defensive areas. This was the forward line of the 1967 X-Sunderbans plan and it was also deemed indefensible in its entirety in that exercise. 3.Dhaka Outer Defence Line: Troops from the fortresses were to retreat to this line. The line ran from Pabna in the west to Bera then Sirajganj to the north, then to Mymensingh. From Mymensingh the line went south to Bhairab Bazar, from Bhairab it ran southwest along the Meghna to Daudkandi and Chandpur, then ran northwest along Padma then to the Madhumati, along the Madhumati back to Pabna. The fortresses of Bhairab and Mymensingh was part of this line. Pabna, Bera, Chandpur, Daudkandi and Faridpur was to be turned into fortresses, while Kamarkhali, Goalanda, Nagarbari and Narshindi were to be strong points. Faridpur and Narshindi were turned into strong points when the attack was begun in December, the rest of the sites were not built up. 4.Dhaka Inner Defense Line: This ran from Manikganj in the west to Kaliakair, on to Tongi, then to Naryanganj and from Naryanganj back to Manikganj. This area was to have a fortress – Naryanganj and strong points at Kalaikair and Tongi. None were developed by December 1971.

Having chosen the defensive concept and defensive lines, Pakistan Eastern Command outlined the course of action as follows:

- Troops deployed on the border would hold on till ordered to retreat by the GOC
- Troops would 'Trade space for time' and fight a delaying action while falling back to the nearest fortress
- The fortress would be defended to the last – which was understood until a certain amount of time needed for Pakistan to deliver the knockout blow in the west.
- The troops formations would fall back to the Dhaka outer line to defend Dhaka as needed.

The divisional commanders were authorised to make plans for limited counterattacks in Indian territory to aid in their defensive objectives, which was to maintain control of the main pathways leading into the province.

=== Assumed enemy axis of attack and Pakistani deployments ===
Pakistani planners assumed, based on intelligence estimates, that an Indian force of 8 to 12 infantry divisions and an armoured brigade, along with the Mukti Bahini would launch the invasion of East Pakistan in winter. Pakistan army had broadly divided the country into 4 sectors, and the Pakistani deployments were:

Northern Sector (Indian designation: North Western Sector): This area is to the north of Padma and West of Jamuna rivers, encompassing the Rajhshahi, Pabna, Bogra, Rangpur and Dinajpur districts. Pakistani planners were undecided on whether the Indian attack would come from the Siliguri Corridor south towards Bogra or on the Hili – Chilimari axis from southwest to northeast to cut the area in two. The 16th Infantry division (CO Maj. Gen. Nazar Hussain Shah, HQ Bogra then Nator) was deployed to counter both possibilities.

The 23rd Brigade (CO brig. S.A Ansari) was to defend the area north of Hili – Chilmari axis. The troops were to retreat to Dinajpur, Saidpur and Rangpur from the border areas, while Dinajpur, Saidpur, T-Junction and Thakurgaon were turned into strongpoints. The area north of the Tista River was a separate defence area, where the 25th Punjab, 86th Mujahid, 1 wing EPCAF and the independent heavy mortar battery was located.

The 205th Brigade (CO Brig. Tajammul Hossain Malik) would defend the area between Hili (a strongpoint) and Naogaon then fall back to Bogra (fortress) and hold out. Palashbari, Phulchari and Joyporhut were turned into strongpoints. The 34th Brigade (CO Brig. M.A. Nayeem) would look after the area between Rajshahi and Naogaon, and if need would fall back to the Outer Dhaka defence line and defend from Pabna and Bera, both proposed fortresses. In September, an ad hoc brigade was formed in Rajshahi to block the Padma from any enemy riverine operations.

Western Sector (Indian designation: Western Sector): The area south of the Padma and east of the Meghna contained the Khulna, Jessore, Kushtia, Faridpur, Barisal and Patuakhali districts and was defended by the 9th Division (CO Maj. Gen. Ansari) made up of 2 infantry brigades: the 107th (CO Brig. Makhdum Hayat, HQ Jessore), covering the border from Jibannagar to the Sundarbans to the south, and the 57th (CO Brig. Manzoor Ahmed, HQ Jhenida), which covered the border from Jibannagar to the Padma in the north. Pakistani planners assumed three likely axis of advance from the Indian army:

- The main attack would come in the Calcutta – Benapol – Jessore axis. The 107th Brigade was tasked with guarding the Benapol axis.
- Another thrust would be made either using the Krishnanagar – Darshana – Chuadanga axis, or the Murshidabad – Rajapur – Kushtia axis. The 57th Brigade (18th Punjab and 29th Baloch) was deployed to cover the Darshana and Meherpur area. To defend the Hardinge Bridge, a tank squadron was placed under Eastern Command control near Kushtia.

In September, an ad hoc brigade, the 314th, (CO Col. Fazle Hamid, one Mujahib battalion, and 5 companies each from EPCAF and Razakars) was created to defend the city of Khulna.

The 57th and 107th brigades were to defend the border then fall back to Jhenida and Jessore, and prevent the enemy from crossing the Jessore –Jhenida road, which runs almost parallel to the border. The brigades also had the option to fall back across the Madhumati river, which formed part of the Dhaka outer defense line, and defend the area between Faridpur, Kamarkhali and Goalanda.

The 14th Division initially had 4 brigades: the 27th (CO Brig. Saadullah Khan, HQ Mymensingh), 313th (Brig Iftikar Rana, HQ Sylhet), the 117th (Brig. Mansoor H. Atif, HQ Comilla) and the 53rd (Brig. Aslam Niazi, HQ Dhaka) and looked after the rest of the province. It was decided in September to make the 14th responsible for the eastern sector encompassing Sylhet, Comilla and Noakhali districts only, while the 36th ad hoc division was remade responsible for the Dhaka Bowl.

Dhaka Bowl (Indian designation: North Eastern Sector): Pakistani planners anticipated a brigade size attack on the Kamalpur – Sherpur – Jamalpur axis and another along the Haluaghat – Mymensingh axis. They deemed this area was impassable because of the hilly terrain on the Indian side and the Modhupur Jungle and the Brahmaputra river to the north of Dhaka. Pakistani deployment in this sector was: 93rd brigade was responsible for the border area between the Jamuna river and Sunamganj. It developed strong points at Kamalpur, Haluaghat and Durgapur, while Jamalpur and Mymensingh were turned into fortresses. The course of the Brahmaputra rives was designated as the "line of no penetration".

53rd brigade was posted in Dhaka as command reserve and was responsible for the Dhaka inner defence line until it was moved to Feni. Dhaka city also had Razakar, EPCAF and other units that could be deployed for defence of the city.

Eastern Sector (Indian designation: South Eastern Sector): This sector included the Chittagong, Noakhali, Comilla and Sylhet districts. The anticipated lines of advance were:

- Agartala – Akhaura – Bhairab Bazar axis would be the main thrust, with another attack coming towards Moulvibazar – Shamshernagar and third near Comilla.

The 14th Division (CO: Maj. Gen. Rahim Khan, then Maj. Gen Abdul Majid Kazi) was initially HQed at Dhaka until the creation of the 36th ad hoc division to cover the Dhaka Bowl, when its HQ moved to Brahmanbaria. Chittagong was designated as an independent defence zone under control of the 97th independent brigade. Also, two ad hoc brigades were created, the 202nd and the 93rd out of the units of the 14th division. The division order of battle after September was:

202nd ad hoc brigade (CO Brig. Salimullah, HQ Sylhet) was responsible for the border stretching from Sunamganj to the north west of Sylhet to Latu to the east of that city. Sylhet was designated as a fortress. The 313th Brigade (CO Brig. Iftekhar Rana), Hqed at Moulvibazar, which was developed as a strong point and the unit was responsible for the border between Latu and Kamalganj. After resisting the expected enemy thrust along the Moulvibazar – Shamshernagar front, the brigade was to move south and link up with the 27th Brigade near Brahmanbaria. Gen Niazi also envisioned this brigade launching an assault inside Tripura if possible.

The 27th Brigade (CO Brig. M. Saadullah) was responsible for covering the border between Kamalganj and Kasba, just north of Comilla, and would block the expected main enemy axis of advance, with strong points at Akhaura and Brahmanbaria. Brig. Saadullah anticipated a 3 pronged assault on his area around Akhaura and planned to ultimately fall back to Bhairab, which was the nearest fortress and part of the Dhaka outer defence line.

The 117th Brigade (CO Brig. S.M. Attif, Hqed at Mainamati) was responsible for the border between Kasba to the north of Comilla (a fortress) to Belonia in Noakhali. It was to concentrate near Comilla in the event of an Indian advance, then fall back to Daudkandi and Chhandpur, which were part of the Dhaka outer defence line and designated "Fortresses".

The 97th independent Infantry Brigade (CO Brig. Ata Md. Khan Malik, HQ Chittagong) was to cover the Chittagong fortress and Chittagong hill tracks.

=== Last Minute Changes: November 1971 ===
GHQ Rawalpindi approved in October 1971 and also gave permission to conduct offensive operations against English Bazar or Balurghat in West Bengal and sending SSG commandos to destroy the Farrakka barrage

==== 39th Ad hoc division ====
In November Gen. Niazi split the 14th division, keeping the 202nd, 27th and the 313th brigades under it. The 117th, 53rd and the 91st brigades were placed under the newly created 39th ad hoc division (CO Maj. Gen. Rahim, Hq Chandpur) with the following responsibilities:

117th Brigade was to cover the area from Kasba to the north of Comilla to Chauddagram to the south. After fighting at the border the force was to redeploy around the Mainamati fortress and then fall back to defend Daudkandi, which was on the Dhaka Outer defence line.

The 53rd brigade was transferred from Dhaka to guard the border from Chaddagram to Belonia. This brigade was to fall back to Chandpur, a fortress located on the Dhaka outer defence line after its initial defence of Feni and Laksham.

91st ad hoc brigade (CO Mian Taskinuddin, HQ Chittagong) was to guard the Belonia – Ramgarh area. It was to fall back to Chittagong after defending the area.

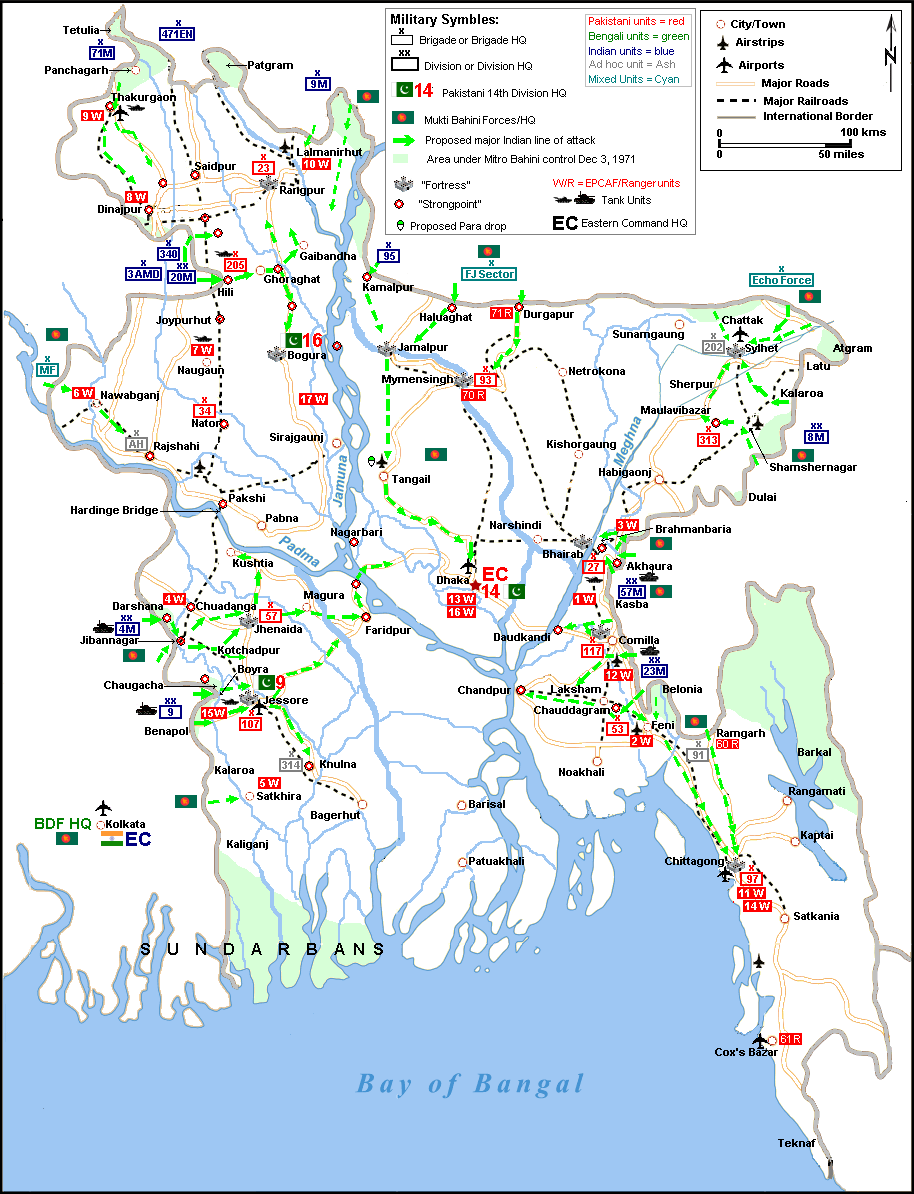
Final Mitro Bahini operational plan in November 1971. A generic representation, some unit locations are not shown.

== Final Mukti Bahini Plan: November 1971 ==
The Indian Army HQ plan of August was modified by Eastern Command during October – November and operational instructions were given to various formations. The final plan did not target Dhaka as the main objective, and a contingency scheme to quickly withdraw at least 2 divisions and redeploy against possible Chinese moves was also incorporated. Mukti Bahini conventional forces were attached to various Indian formations while Mukti Bahini guerrillas not yet deployed inside Bangladesh were formed into infantry companies as auxiliary units.

North – Western Sector (Pakistani designation Northern Sector): The XXXIII corps (OC Lt. general Thapan) was given the 20th Mountain division (initially deployed in near Tibet border), the 71st and 471st Engineer brigade group, 340th (redeployed from Rajasthan) and 9th Mountain brigades and the 3rd armoured brigade. Pakistani 16th division defended this sector.

Lt. Gen. Aurora preferred a brigade size attack along the Hili – Gaibandha axis, while other brigades would fan out to the north and south to occupy major towns. Gen. Thapan preferred to bypass Hili and move to Gaibandha using an alternate route using two brigades. The final draft plan was:

- The 71st brigade group (redeployed from Nagaland) and Mukti Bahini would advance south from Panchagarh towards Dinajpur along both banks of Atrai river.
- The 340th brigade would operate in the area south of Dinajpur, while occupation of Dinajpur and Rangpur, objectives of the August plan, was dropped.
- The 20th Mountain division (redeployed from Tibet border) would use the 202nd brigade against Pakistani positions at Hili, while the 66th brigade bypassed Hili along the Phulbari – Pirganj – Gobindaganj – Bogra axis, thus splitting apart Pakistani forces in the sector. The 165th brigade was in reserve securing Balurghat and would support either brigade if needed.
- A Mixed brigade of Mukti Bahini (Sector no 7) and BSF would advance along the Malda – Nawabganj – Rajshahi axis.
- The 9th Mountain brigade and Mukti Bahini (Sector no 6) would occupy the area north of Tista and then move south to Rangpur.

Lt. Gen. Aurora made two changes: He ordered Gen. Thapan to make the Hili –Gaibandha the main thrust line and the capture of Rangpur one of the objectives despite objections of Gen. Thapan and Jakob.

Western Sector (Pakistani designation Western Sector): This sector was defended by Pakistani 9th division. The newly created II Corps (4th Mountain and 9th Infantry divisions) along with Mukti Bahini was deployed against this sector. The plan was:

- Mukti Bahini Sectors 8 and 9 would attack along the Satkhira – Khulna axis, assisted by units of the Bengal Area corps.
- The 9th division initially planned to attack along the Benapol – Jessore axis. At Gen. Jacob's suggestion, the main thrust was set along the Boyra – Garibpur – Jessore axis while a secondary attack would be made along the Benapol – Jessore line.
- The role of the 4th Mountain division was hotly debated by Gen. Jacob and Raina. Gen. Jacob wanted the division to attack along the Shikarpur – Jhenida axis with a secondary attack along the Meherpur – Kushtia axis to capture the Hardinge bridge, an objective selected by the Army HQ. Gen Raina preferred to keep the division close to the 9th and wanted to move along the Darshan –Jibannagar –Kotchandpur axis with a secondary thrust along the Jibannagar – Chuadanga axis. Gen Riana got his way when Indian army activity alerted Pakistani forces about the possible Indian thrust along the Shikarpur – Jhenida line.

After isolating Jessore and Jhenaidah, the 9th division was to send a brigade to capture Khulna, while a brigade from the 4th Mountain would move north to take Kushtia and Hardinge bridge. The rest of the force was to head east to capture Magura and Faridpur, then cross the Padma and move on Dhaka.

North Eastern Sector (Pakistani designation Dhaka Bowl): Eastern Command was not allocated the 6th Mountain division or the HQ of the 2nd Mountain division for this area, so the 101st Communication zone was picked to head operations in this sector. Pakistani 36th ad hoc division defended this area. Indian plan of attack was:

- The FJ brigade (Mukti Bahini Sector 11 and BSF units) would attack Durgapur and Haluaghat and move towards Mymenshingh.
- The 95th brigade group would move along the Kamalpur – Bakshiganj – Jamalpur axis. After crossing the Brahmaputra, Jamalpur would be isolated, then the Indian force, aided by Kaderia Bahini would move to Tangail.
- A Para battalion would be air dropped in Tangail.

After securing Tangail, Mitro Bahini would move towards Dhaka, reinforced by 2/3 brigades not designated in the plan. Mukti Bahini was expected to start an uprising in Dhaka to aid the advancing forces.

South Eastern Sector (Pakistani designation Eastern Sector): Pakistani 14th infantry and 39th ad hoc divisions defended this sector. Mukti Bahini sectors 1 – 5, K and S force brigades and Indian IV corps was selected to operate in this sector. The plan was:

- Echo Force brigade (Mukti Bahini Z force brigade, BSF units, Mukti Bahini Sector #5) would advance on Sylhet from the north from several directions.
- 8th Mountain division (redeployed from Mizoram) would move the 81st mountain brigade along Shamshernagar – Moulvibazar and the 59th Mountain brigade would advance along the Kulaura – Fenchuganj axis with Mukti Bahini sector no 4. The 81st was to secure the Sherpur and Shadipur ferry and then become the corps reserve while the 59th moved north to Sylhet.
- 57th Mountain division (redeployed from Nagaland) would attack in Akhaura –Brahmanbaria area. The 61st brigade and would secure the area north of Comilla and contain the city. The 311th mountain brigade would attack to the north of Akhaura towards Ashuganj while the 73rd brigade would attack from the south along the Akhaura – Brahmanbaria axis. Mukti Bahini S force brigade would attack towards Ashuganj moving in the area north of the 311th brigade. The 61st Mountain brigade would attack the area north of Comilla and push towards Daudkandi, while a part of its force contained the Comilla garrison. The objective was to occupy the area up to the Meghna river between Daudkandi and Ashuganj while containing Comilla.
- 23rd Mountain division (redeployed from Himalaya border) was to use the 301st Mountain brigade to occupy Comilla airport, then move along the Comilla – Mudafferganj – Chandpur axis to secure Chandpur. The 181st brigade was to secure Laksham – Chauddugram area before moving on Noakhali – Chandpur. Kilo force brigade (Mukti Bahini sector no 1, K force brigade and Indian units) was to move from Belonia to Feni then south along the Comilla – Chittagong road towards Chittagong. The 83rd Mountain brigade was kept in reserve to be used as needed.

The main responsibility of the IV core along with Mukti Bahini sector no 2 and 3 were to secure the area between Ashuganj and Chandpur, contain Comilla and then if possible approach Dhaka by crossing the Meghna using helicopters or river ferries – whichever was available.

== See also ==
- Mitro Bahini order of battle
- Pakistan Army order of battle, December 1971
- Evolution of Pakistan Eastern Command plan
- Timeline of the Bangladesh Liberation War
- Indo-Pakistani wars and conflicts

== Sources ==
- Ali, Rao Farman (1992). How Pakistan Got Divided. Jang Publishers. ISBN 984-05-0157-7.
- Hasan, Moyeedul (2004). Muldhara, 71. University Press Limited. ISBN 978-984-05-0121-2.
- Islam, Rafiqul (2006). A Tale of Millions. Ananna. ISBN 978-984-412-033-4.
- Jacob, JFR (2004). Surrender at Dacca: Birth of A Nation. The University Press Limited. ISBN 984-05-1532-2.
- Khan, Fazal Mukeem (1973). Pakistan's Crisis in Leadership. National Book Foundation. OCLC 976643179.
- Khan, Gul Hassan (1978). Memories of Lt. Gen. Gul Hassan Khan. Oxford University Press. ISBN 0-19-547329-9.
- Lehl, Lachhman Singh (1991) [First published 1981]. Victory in Bangladesh (Revised ed.). Natraj Publishers. OCLC 28292625.
- Matinuddin, Kamal (1994). Tragedy of Errors: East Pakistan Crisis 1968 – 1971. Lahore Wajidalis. ISBN 978-969-8031-19-0.
- Nasir Uddin (2005). Juddhey Juddhey Swadhinata. Agami Prokashoni. ISBN 978-984-401-455-8.
- Niazi, A.A.K (1998). The Betrayal of East Pakistan. Oxford University Press. ISBN 0-19-577727-1.
- Qureshi, Hakeem Arshad (2003). The Indo Pak War of 1971: A Soldiers Narrative. Oxford University Press. ISBN 978-0-19-579778-7.
- Riza, Shaukat (1977). The Pakistan Army 1966–71. Natraj. ISBN 978-81-85019-61-1.
- Salik, Siddiq (1997). Witness to Surrender. Oxford University Press. ISBN 81-7062-108-9.
- Shafiullah, K. M. (2006). Bangladesh at War. Agamee Prakshani. ISBN 978-984-401-322-3.
- Singh, Sukhwant (1980). India's Wars Since Independence. Vol. 1. New Delhi: Vikas Publishing House. ISBN 0-7069-1057-5.
