= Union councils of Chuadanga District =

Union councils of Chuadanga District (Bengali: চুয়াডাঙ্গা জেলার ইউনিয়ন পরিষদসমূহ) are the smallest rural administrative and local government units in Chuadanga District of Bangladesh. The district consists of 4 municipalities, 4 upazilas, 5 thana, 57 ward, 70 mahalla, 38 union porishods, mouza 376 and 455 villages.

== Alamdanga Upazila ==
Alamdanga Upazila is divided into Alamdanga Municipality and 15 union parishads. The union parishads are subdivided into 126 mauzas and 211 villages. Alamdanga Municipality is subdivided into 9 wards and 18 mahallas.

- Ailhash Union
- Belgachi Union
- Baradi Union
- Bhangbaria Union
- Chitla Union
- Dauki Union
- Gangni Union
- Hardi Union
- Jamjami Union
- Jehala Union
- Kalidashpur Union
- Khadimpur Union
- Khashkorara Union
- Kumari Union
- Nagdah Union

== Chuadanga Sadar Upazila ==
Chuadanga Sadar Upazila is divided into Chuadanga Municipality and nine union parishads. The union parishads are subdivided into 90 mauzas and 129 villages. Chuadanga Municipality is subdivided into 9 wards and 41 mahallas.

- Alukdia Union
- Begumpur Union
- Kutubpur Union
- Mominpur Union
- Padmabila Union
- Shankarchandra Union
- Titudah Union

== Damurhuda Upazila ==
Damurhuda Upazila is divided into Darshana Municipality and seven union parishads. The union parishads are subdivided into 78 mauzas and 102 villages. Darshana Municipality is subdivided into 9 wards and 21 mahallas.

- Damurhuda Union
- Hawli Union
- Juranpur Union
- Karpashdanga Union
- Kurulgachi Union
- Natipota Union
- Natudah Union
- Perkrishnopur Madna Union

== Jibannagar Upazila ==
Jibannagar Upazila is divided into Jibannagar Municipality and seven union parishads. The union parishads are subdivided into 76 mauzas and 82 villages. Jibannagar Municipality is subdivided into 9 wards and 9 mahallas.

- Andulbaria Union
- Banka Union
- Hasadah Union
- KDK Union
- Monohorpur Union
- Raypur Union
- Shimanto Union
- Uthali Union
