= Atchala Ghar =

- আটচালা ঘর (Bengali)
- Location: Mission Para, Karpashdanga, Damurhuda Upazila, Chuadanga District

History
- Built: During British Indian period

Site notes
- Owner: Prakriti Biswas Bakul

Atchala Ghar (lit. 'Eight Roofed thatched') is a historical house. It is a memorial place related to Kazi Nazrul Islam. It is located on the Darshana–Mujibnagar road in Karpashdanga Union of Damurhuda Upazila, about 20 kilometers southwest of the district town of Chuadanga.

== History ==
When Kazi Nazrul Islam lived in Armhurst Street, Calcutta, he had very close relations with Baidyanath Babu, Harshapriya Biswas and Mahim Sarkar who were residents of the same area. In 1926 and 1927, on their invitation, Kazi Nazrul Islam came to Karpasdanga with his family. After arriving here, local leader Harshpriya Biswas allowed Nazrul to stay in his Atchala Ghar which is near Darshana railway station. In 1926, Kazi Nazrul Islam and his family stayed here for two months. During the time of day, Mahaim Sarkar's two daughters, Abha Rani and Shiuli Rani, used to learn Nazrul Geeti from Kazi Nazrul Islam, sitting here under the trees.

Nazrul wrote some of his famous rhymes, poems and novels here. These include the humorous children's poem Lichuchor, the short story Padmagokhara, and the novel Mrityukshuda. Many people think that Nazrul found the content of his works from the geographical and social environment of this area.

Not only the literary life, but also the story of Nazrul's political life is surrounded by this place. Nazrul actively participated in the anti-British movement. He was always vocal in the movement to get the rights of the exploited people and prevent social injustice. He also used this place for agitation purposes. He has held numerous meetings with local leaders here. When Hulia was issued, he came to this house and stayed several times.

The cot and cupboard used by Nazrul are still preserved in the Atchala Ghar. The descendants of Shri Harshapriya Biswas are cherishing Nazrul's memory with care. The successors of the Harshapriyo faith have to spend a lot of money on regular renovation works. Presently the owner of this house is Prakriti Biswas Bakul.
