= Habib ur Rahman =

Habib ur Rahman (Arabic: حبیب الرحمان) is an Arabic male given name, meaning friend of the Merciful One. It may refer to:

- Habib Ur Rehman (Nayab Sahab; Born 1957), Indian politician.
- Hakim Habibur Rahman (1881–1947), Unani physician, litterateur, journalist, politician and chronicler in Dhaka, (now Bangladesh)
- Habib ur Rahman (Indian National Army officer) (1913–1978), officer of the British Indian Army and the Indian National Army
- Muhammad Habibur Rahman (1928–2014), chief justice of Bangladesh Supreme Court
- Habib Rahman (detainee) (born ca. 1982), Afghan held in Guantanamo
- Habibur Rehman Mondal (born 1986), Indian footballer
- Habib-ur-Rehman (actor) (1929–2016), Pakistani film actor, director, producer and television actor
- Habib Rahman (architect) (1915–1995), Indian architect
- Habibur Rahman (cricketer) (born 1987), Bangladeshi cricketer
- Habibur Rehman (field hockey) (born 1925), Pakistani Olympic hockey player
- Habib ur Rahman (politician) (born 1948), Pakistani politician
- Habibur Rahman (Bogra politician) (1931–2002), Bangladesh Nationalist Party politician
- Habibur Rahman (Jamaat-e-Islami politician) (c. 1935–2010)
- Habibur Rahman (poet) (1923–1976), Bangladeshi journalist, poet and writer
- Habibur Rahman (Chuadanga politician)
- Habibur Rahman (Indian politician) (died 2016), Indian teacher and politician from West Bengal
- Habibur Rahman (police officer) (born 1967), Bangladeshi police officer
- Habiburrahman Shakir (1903–1975), Tatar imam, theologian, publisher
- Habibur Rahman (Chandpur politician), Bangladeshi politician, journalist, writer and publisher
- Habibur Rahman (Jessore politician), Pakistani politician and activist
- Habibar Rahman (born 1945), Bangladeshi politician
- Muhammad Habibar Rahman (1923 - 1971), Bengali intellectual killed in the Bangladesh Liberation war
- Md. Habibur Rahman, Bangladeshi politician

== See also ==
- Habib
- Rahman (name)
