= Chuadanga-2 =

Constituency of Bangladesh's Jatiya Sangsad

Coordinates: 23.60°N 88.78°E

- Constituency for the Jatiya Sangsad
- District: Chuadanga District
- Division: Khulna Division
- Electorate: 492,431 (2026)

Current constituency
- Created: 1984
- Party: Bangladesh Jamaat-e-Islami
- Member: Md. Ruhul Amin
- ← 79 Chuadanga-1 81 Jhenaidah-1 →

Chuadanga-2 is a constituency represented in the Jatiya Sangsad (National Parliament) of Bangladesh since 2026 by Md. Ruhul Amin of the Bangladesh Jamaat-e-Islami.

== Boundaries ==
The constituency encompasses Damurhuda and Jibannagar upazilas, and four union parishads of Chuadanga Sadar Upazila: Begumpur, Nehalpur, Garaitupi and Titudah.

== History ==
The constituency was created in 1984 from a Kushtia constituency when the former Kushtia District was split into three districts: Meherpur, Kushtia, and Chuadanga.

== Members of Parliament ==
Election	Member	Party
1986	Mirza Sultan Raja	Jatiya Samajtantrik Dal (Siraj)
1988	Habibur Rahman	Jatiya Party
1991	Maulana Habibur Rahman	Bangladesh Jamaat-e-Islami
Feb 1996	Mozammel Haque	Bangladesh Nationalist Party
2001	Mozammel Haque	Bangladesh Nationalist Party
2008	Md. Ali Azgar	Awami League
2014	Md. Ali Azgar	Awami League
2018	Md. Ali Azgar	Awami League
2024	Md. Ali Azgar	Awami League
2026	Md. Ruhul Amin	Bangladesh Jamaat-e-Islami

== Elections ==
=== Elections in the 2020s ===
General Election 2026: Chuadanga-2
Party	Candidate	Votes	%	±%
Jamaat	Md. Ruhul Amin	208,011	55.0	N/A
BNP	Mahmud Hasan Khan	163,877	43.3	N/A
IAB	Md. Hasanuzzaman	6,374	1.7	N/A
Majority		44,134	11.7	N/A
Turnout		378,262	76.8	N/A
Registered electors		492,431		
Jamaat gain from AL				

=== Elections in the 2010s ===
General Election 2014: Chuadanga-2
Party	Candidate	Votes	%	±%
AL	Md. Ali Azgar	118,385	93.6	+42.3
WPB	Sirazul Islam Sheikh	8,030	6.4	N/A
Majority		110,355	87.3	−5.4
Turnout		126,415	34.3	−58.4
AL hold				

=== Elections in the 2000s ===
General Election 2008: Chuadanga-2
Party	Candidate	Votes	%	±%
AL	Md. Ali Azgar	156,323	51.3	+9.7
Jamaat	Maulana Habibur Rahman	143,418	47.0	N/A
Zaker Party	Md. Abdul Latif Khan	5,216	1.7	N/A
Majority		12,905	4.2	−11.2
Turnout		304,957	92.7	+3.6
AL gain from BNP				

General Election 2001: Chuadanga-2
Party	Candidate	Votes	%	±%
BNP	Mozammel Haque	146,548	57.0	+23.7
AL	Mirza Sultana Raja	107,050	41.6	+8.8
IJOF	Md. Nabi Chowdhury	2,744	1.1	N/A
CPB	Shahidul Islam	957	0.4	N/A
Majority		39,498	15.4	+14.9
Turnout		257,299	89.1	+3.8
BNP hold				

=== Elections in the 1990s ===
General Election June 1996: Chuadanga-2
Party	Candidate	Votes	%	±%
BNP	Mozammel Haque	64,755	33.3	+3.8
AL	Mirza Sultan Raja	63,732	32.8	N/A
Jamaat	Maulana Habibur Rahman	48,944	25.2	−11.4
JP(E)	Habibur Rahman Hobby	11,187	5.8	−2.2
Independent	Md. Nabi Chowdhury	2,324	1.2	N/A
IOJ	A. Mannan	1,872	1.0	+0.6
Zaker Party	Amir Hossain	1,397	0.7	+0.3
Majority		1,023	0.5	−6.6
Turnout		194,211	85.3	+21.3
BNP gain from Jamaat				

General Election 1991: Chuadanga-2
Party	Candidate	Votes	%	±%
Jamaat	Maulana Habibur Rahman	49,688	36.6	
BNP	Mozammel Haque	40,020	29.5	
Jatia Mukti Dal	Mirza Sultan Raza	25,470	18.8	
JP(E)	Habibur Rahman Hobby	10,788	8.0	
Zaker Party	Saidur Rahman	5,832	4.3	
Independent	Shahidul Islam	2,478	1.8	
Bangladesh Muslim League (Kader)	Nabis Uddin	629	0.5	
IOJ	A. Mannan	493	0.4	
Independent	Yunus Ali	273	0.2	
Majority		9,668	7.1	
Turnout		135,671	64.0	
Jamaat hold				
