= Kashipur Zamindar Bari =

Historical place in Jibannagar Upazila, Chuadanga, Bangladesh

General information
- Location: Kashipur, Jibannagar Upazila, Chuadanga District, Bangladesh
- Coordinates: 23.4656425°N 88.878328°E

Kashipur Zamindar Bari is a historical place. It is a memorial place of Saratchandra Chattopadhyay. It is currently located in Chuadanga District of Bangladesh.

== Location ==
The Zamindar Bari is located in the bank area of Bhairab River in Kashipur village of KDK Union, 7 kilometres from Jibannagar in Chuadanga District.

== History ==
This Zamindar Bari was built in 1861. The Zamindars of that time Minay Kumar and Vinay Kumar lived here. They were very oppressive. They used to oppress and torture the villagers. Because of this, the villagers were always afraid.

Before 14–15 August 1947, Kashipur Zamindar Bari belonged to Nadia District. Minay Kumar and Vinay Kumar exchanged 1200 bighas of land with the ancestors of the residents who are currently living here and went to India with their family. Through this, this zamindari system was abolished and the villagers started living peacefully.

The house still has various items used by the Zamindars including sofas, tables, couches and other things. Besides, the special motor for lifting the water still exists here. The house also has a golaghar and a well. In front of the main gate of the house there is a krishna chura and banyan tree. Currently two brothers named Kabeel and Habeel are living in this house. They say about this house that it is very dangerous to stay, yet they are living here.
