= Chuadanga-1 =

Constituency of Bangladesh's Jatiya Sangsad

Coordinates: 23.64°N 88.85°E

- Constituency for the Jatiya Sangsad
- District: Chuadanga District
- Division: Khulna Division
- Electorate: 511,657 (2026)

Current constituency
- Created: 1984
- Party: Bangladesh Jamaat-e-Islami
- Member: Md. Masud Parves
- ← 78 Kushtia-4 80 Chuadanga-2 →

Chuadanga-1 is a constituency represented in the Jatiya Sangsad (National Parliament) of Bangladesh since 2026 by Md. Masud Parves of the Bangladesh Jamaat-e-Islami.

== Boundaries ==
The constituency encompasses Alamdanga Upazila, Chuadanga Municipality, and five union parishads of Chuadanga Sadar Upazila: Alokdia, Kutubpur, Mominpur, Padmabila, and Shankar Chandra.

== History ==
The constituency was created in 1984 from the Kushtia-7 constituency when the former Kushtia District was split into three districts: Meherpur, Kushtia, and Chuadanga.

== Members of Parliament ==
Election	Member	Party
1986	Makbul Hossain	Jatiya Party
1988	Mohammad Shahjahan	Combined Opposition Party
1991	Miah Mohammed Monsur Ali	Bangladesh Nationalist Party
Feb 1996	Shamsuzzaman Dudu	Bangladesh Nationalist Party
2001	Shahidul Islam Biswas	Bangladesh Nationalist Party
2008	Solaiman Haque Joarder	Awami League
2014	Solaiman Haque Joarder	Awami League
2018	Solaiman Haque Joarder	Awami League
2024	Solaiman Haque Joarder	Awami League
2026	Md. Masud Parves	Bangladesh Jamaat-e-Islami

== Elections ==
=== Elections in the 2020s ===
General Election 2026: Chuadanga-1
Party	Candidate	Votes	%	±%
Jamaat	Md. Masud Parves	211,041	56.4	N/A
BNP	Md. Sharifuzzaman	153,193	40.9	N/A
IAB	Mohammad Zahurul Islam	10,122	2.7	N/A
Majority		57,848	15.5	N/A
Turnout		374,356	73.2	N/A
Registered electors		511,657		
Jamaat gain from AL				

=== Elections in the 2010s ===
General Election 2014: Chuadanga-1
Party	Candidate	Votes	%	±%
AL	Solaiman Haque Joarder	145,134	87.8	+31.3
Jatiya Samajtantrik Dal-JSD	Md. Sobed Ali	20,108	12.2	N/A
Majority		125,026	75.7	+61.1
Turnout		165,242	41.6	−50.5
AL hold				

=== Elections in the 2000s ===
General Election 2008: Chuadanga-1
Party	Candidate	Votes	%	±%
AL	Solaiman Haque Joarder	184,793	56.5	+15.1
BNP	Ohidul Islam Biswas	136,889	41.8	−13.7
IAB	Asad-Uzzaman Sardar	5,027	1.5	N/A
National People's Party	Idris Chowdhury	579	0.2	N/A
Majority		47,904	14.6	+0.5
Turnout		327,288	92.1	+5.1
AL gain from BNP				

General Election 2001: Chuadanga-1
Party	Candidate	Votes	%	±%
BNP	Shahidul Islam Biswas	151,763	55.5	+13.9
AL	Solaiman Haque Joarder	113,333	41.4	+5.5
Independent	Mir Shamsuzzoha	6,381	2.3	N/A
IJOF	Sohrab Hossain	1,487	0.5	N/A
Ganatantri Party	Md. Khandokar Motaharul Islam	343	0.1	N/A
Jatiya Party (M)	Md. Abul Hossain Nantu	185	0.1	N/A
Majority		38,430	14.1	+8.4
Turnout		273,492	87.0	+2.4
BNP hold				

=== Elections in the 1990s ===
General Election June 1996: Chuadanga-1
Party	Candidate	Votes	%	±%
BNP	Shamsuzzaman Dudu	89,786	41.6	+6.9
AL	Solaiman Haque Joarder	77,489	35.9	+2.4
Jamaat	Md. Abdul Khaleq	35,365	16.4	N/A
JP(E)	Md. Saiful Islam Pinu	5,212	2.4	N/A
Jatiya Samajtantrik Dal-JSD	Md. Touhid Hossain	3,403	1.6	+1.2
IOJ	Moulana Yunus Ali	3,034	1.4	N/A
WPB	Md. Mokhlesur Rahman	615	0.3	−0.4
Independent	M. Sanwar Hossain	298	0.1	N/A
BKA	Nurur Rahman	253	0.1	N/A
FP	Mohammad Bazlul Huda	129	0.1	−27.8
Independent	Md. Nazrul Islam	100	0.0	N/A
Majority		12,297	5.7	+4.5
Turnout		215,684	84.6	+16
BNP hold				

General Election 1991: Chuadanga-1
Party	Candidate	Votes	%	±%
BNP	Miah Mohammed Monsur Ali	55,387	34.7	
AL	Solaiman Haque Joarder	53,535	33.5	
FP	Mohammad Bazlul Huda	44,630	27.9	
Zaker Party	A Bari	4,456	2.8	
WPB	Bablu Rahman	1,145	0.7	
Jatiya Samajtantrik Dal-JSD	Mohammad Shahjahan	595	0.4	
Majority		1,852	1.2	
Turnout		159,748	68.6	
BNP gain from				
