= Md. Masud Parves =

Bangladeshi politician

- মোঃ মাসুদ পারভেজ

Member of the Bangladesh Parliament for Chuadanga-1
- Incumbent
- Assumed office 17 February 2026
- Preceded by: Solaiman Haque Joarder

Personal details
- Born: June 10, 1985 (age 41) Alamdanga Upazila, Chuadanga District
- Party: Bangladesh Jamaat-e-Islami

Md. Masud Parves is a Bangladeshi politician of the Bangladesh Jamaat-e-Islami. He is currently serving as a member of parliament from Chuadanga-1.

== Early life ==
Parves was born on 10 June 1985 in Alamdanga Upazila in Chuadanga District.
