= Solaiman Haque Joarder =

Bangladeshi politician

Member of the Bangladesh Parliament for Chuadanga-1
- In office 25 January 2009 – 6 August 2024
- Preceded by: Shahidul Islam Biswas
- Succeeded by: Md. Masud Parves

Personal details
- Born: 15 March 1946 (age 80)
- Died: 13 June 2025 (aged 79) Dhaka, Bangladesh
- Party: Awami League

Solaiman Haque Joarder (also known as Selun 15 March 1946 - 13 June 2025) is an Awami League politician and a former member of Jatiya Sangsad representing the Chuadanga-1 constituency during 2009–2024.

== Early life ==
Joarder was born on 15 March 1946. He completed his education up to S.S.C. or grade ten. During the Bangladesh Liberation war he served in the Mukti Bahini.

== Career ==
Joarder was nominated by Awami League to contest the 1991 parliamentary election from Chuadanga-1. He lost the election with 53,535 votes to Miah Mohammed Monsur Ali of Bangladesh Nationalist Party who received 55,387.

Joarder received the Awami League nomination to contest the General Election of June 1996 from Chuadanga-1. He won 77,489 votes but lost the election to Shamsuzzaman Dudu of Bangladesh Nationalist Party who received 89,786 votes.

Joarder received the Awami League nomination to contest the 2001 Bangladeshi general election from Chuadanga-1. He received 113,333 votes while Shahidul Islam Biswas of Bangladesh Nationalist Party won the election by receiving 151,763 votes.

Joarder was first successfully elected in the 2008 Bangladesh general election from Chuadanga-1. He received 184,793 votes while his nearest rival of Bangladesh Nationalist Party received 136,889 votes. Joarder and his brother, Reazul Islam, filed cases against 80 people including The Daily Amar Desh correspondent Dalim Hossain and the Prothom Alo correspondent Shah Alam in 2009. Dalim Hossain was arrested in the case. On 24 March 2012 he received government approval for his private university, First Capital University, in Chuadanga District.

Joarder was reelected unopposed in 2014 Bangladeshi general election. The opposition leader and chairperson of Bangladesh Nationalist Party, Khaleda Zia, was placed under house arrest before the election and her party subsequently boycotted it. He is a member of the Parliamentary Standing Committee on the Ministry of Post and Telecommunications. On 24 January 2014 he was appointed a whip the 10th Parliament. In December 2015, he and his supporters attacked Chuadanga Sadar Police Station to release two activists of the Bangladesh Chhatra League, the student front of Awami League, who were detained the day before. They vandalized police vehicles and injured policemen on duty.

Joarder was re-elected to parliament on 30 December 2018 with 309, 993 votes while his nearest rival of Bangladesh Nationalist Party, Md Sharifuzzaman, received 23,120 votes.

In August 2024, the Anti-Corruption Commission of Bangladesh decided to investigate the allegations of corruption brought against Joarder.
