= Andulbaria Union =

Andulbaria Union আন্দুলবাড়ীয়া ইউনিয়ন
- Union
- Andulbaria Union
- Location within Bangladesh
- Coordinates: 23.4808°N 88.8967°E
- Country: Bangladesh
- Division: Khulna
- District: Chuadanga
- Upazila: Jibannagar

Area
  - Total: 36.20 km^{2} (13.98 sq mi)

Population (2011)
  - Total: 27,397
  - Density: 756.8/km^{2} (1,960/sq mi)
- Time zone: UTC+6 (BST)
- Website: andulbaria.chuadanga.gov.bd

Andulbaria Union (Bengali: আন্দুলবাড়ীয়া ইউনিয়ন) is a union parishad of Jibannagar Upazila, in Chuadanga District, Khulna Division of Bangladesh. The union has an area of 36.20 square kilometres (13.98 sq mi) and as of 2001 had a population of 27,397. There are 13 villages and 11 mouzas in the union.
