= Habibur Rahman (Jamaat-e-Islami politician) =

Bangladeshi politician

Member of Parliament for Chuadanga-2
- In office 27 February 1991 – 16 February 1996
- Preceded by: Habibur Rahman
- Succeeded by: Mozammel Haque

Personal details
- Born: c. 1935
- Died: 23 September 2010
- Party: Bangladesh Jamaat-e-Islami
- Education: Government Madrasah-e-Alia

Habibur Rahman (c. 1935 – 23 September 2010) was a politician of Chuadanga District of Bangladesh who was the member of parliament for the Chuadanga-2 constituency in 1991.

== Birth and early life ==
Habibur Rahman was born in 1935 in Chapra, Nadia district of India. In 1950, he started living as a family in the village of Hogaldanga in Damurhuda, Chuadanga. He first studied at Comilla Kamrangirchar Madrasa, later he completed kamil level from Dhaka Alia Madrasa.

== Career ==
Habibur Rahman was a member of the Shura in the Central Majlis of Bangladesh Jamaat-e-Islami. He joined Chhatra Sangha in 1960 and Jamaat in 1969. In the fifth parliamentary elections of 1991, he was elected as a member of parliament from Chuadanga-2 constituency as a candidate of Bangladesh Jamaat-e-Islami. He was defeated by Chuadanga-2 constituency as a Jamaat candidate in the seventh parliamentary elections on 12 June 1996 and the ninth parliamentary elections in 2008.

== War crimes and controversy ==
Habibur Rahman was the president of the peace committee of Jivannagar in Chuadanga during the war of liberation. It was alleged that under his leadership, Abdur Razzak, a freedom fighter from Kayagram, was taken to the Hasadah camp, killed and later his body was disappeared. He was arrested on 1 January 1972 under the Brokers Act and was convicted along with 752 other war criminals convicted under the Brokers Act. When the Ziaur Rahman government repealed the Brokers Act, he was released along with others.

== Death ==
Habibur Rahman died on 23 September 2010.
