= Juranpur Union =

Juranpur Union জুড়ানপুর ইউনিয়ন
- Union
- Juranpur Union
- Country: Bangladesh
- Division: Khulna
- District: Chuadanga
- Upazila: Damurhuda

Area
  - Total: 124.78 km^{2} (48.18 sq mi)

Population (2011)
  - Total: 28,750
  - Density: 230.4/km^{2} (596.7/sq mi)
- Time zone: UTC+6 (BST)
- Website: juranpurup.chuadanga.gov.bd

Juranpur Union (Bengali: জুড়ানপুর ইউনিয়ন) is a union parishad situated at Damurhuda Upazila, in Chuadanga District, Khulna Division of Bangladesh. The union has an area of 124.78 square kilometres (48.18 sq mi) and as of 2001 had a population of 28,750. There are 12 villages and 8 mouzas in the union.
