= Natipota Union =

Natipota Union নতিপোতা ইউনিয়ন
- Union
- Natipota Union
- Location within Bangladesh
- Coordinates: 23.6553°N 88.7150°E
- Country: Bangladesh
- Division: Khulna
- District: Chuadanga
- Upazila: Damurhuda

Area
  - Total: 127.56 km^{2} (49.25 sq mi)

Population (2011)
  - Total: 30,503
  - Density: 239.13/km^{2} (619.34/sq mi)
- Time zone: UTC+6 (BST)
- Website: natipota.chuadanga.gov.bd

Natipota Union (Bengali: নতিপোতা ইউনিয়ন) is a union parishad situated at Damurhuda Upazila, in Chuadanga District, Khulna Division of Bangladesh. The union has an area of 127.56 square kilometres (49.25 sq mi) and as of 2001 had a population of 30,503. There are 19 villages and 12 mouzas in the union.
