= Hatboalia High School =

Hatboalia Higher Secondary School & College

Location
- Bangladesh
- Coordinates: 23.8235°N 88.8606°E

Information
- Established: 1925
- Founder: Riaz Uddin
- Principal: Abdus Sattar
- Faculty: 30
- Enrollment: more than 500

Hatboalia Higher Secondary School (Bengali: হাটবোয়ালিয়া উচ্চ মাধ্যমিক বিদ্যালয়) is a secondary school in Alamdanga Upazila, Bangladesh.

== History ==
Hatboalia is the first high school in its area. It was founded in 1925 by Dr. Riaz Uddin.

== Notable alumni ==
- Radhabinod Pal
