= Perkrishnopur Madna Union =

Perkrishnopur Madna Union পারকৃষ্ণপুর মদনা ইউনিয়ন
- Union
- Perkrishnopur Madna Union
- Location within Bangladesh
- Coordinates: 23.5178°N 88.7743°E
- Country: Bangladesh
- Division: Khulna
- District: Chuadanga
- Upazila: Damurhuda

Area
  - Total: 67.66 km^{2} (26.12 sq mi)

Population (2011)
  - Total: 29,112
  - Density: 430.3/km^{2} (1,114/sq mi)
- Time zone: UTC+6 (BST)
- Website: perkrishnopurmadna.chuadanga.gov.bd

Perkrishnopur Madna Union (Bengali: পারকৃষ্ণপুর মদনা ইউনিয়ন) is a union parishad of Damurhuda Upazila, in Chuadanga District, Khulna Division of Bangladesh. The union has an area of 67.66 square kilometres (26.12 sq mi) and as of 2001 had a population of 29,112. There are 14 villages and 12 mouzas in the union.
