= Natudah Union =

Natudah Union নাটুদহ ইউনিয়ন
- Union
- Natudah Union
- Location within Bangladesh
- Coordinates: 23.6428°N 88.6737°E
- Country: Bangladesh
- Division: Khulna
- District: Chuadanga
- Upazila: Damurhuda

Area
  - Total: 87.44 km^{2} (33.76 sq mi)

Population (2011)
  - Total: 27,413
  - Density: 313.5/km^{2} (812.0/sq mi)
- Time zone: UTC+6 (BST)
- Website: natudahup.chuadanga.gov.bd

Natudah Union (Bengali: নাটুদহ ইউনিয়ন) is a union parishad situated at Damurhuda Upazila, in Chuadanga District, Khulna Division of Bangladesh. The union has an area of 87.44 square kilometres (33.76 sq mi) and as of 2001 had a population of 27,413. There are 14 villages and 8 mouzas in the union.
