= Mohammad Shahjahan (politician) =

Bangladeshi politician

- মোহাম্মদ শাহজাহান

Member of Parliament for Chuadanga-1
- In office 1988–1990
- Preceded by: Makbul Hossain
- Succeeded by: Miah Mohammed Monsur Ali

Personal details
- Born: 31 December 1935 (age 90) Chuadanga District
- Party: Bangladesh Awami League

Mohammad Shahjahan (born 31 December 1935) is a politician of Chuadanga District of Bangladesh and former member of parliament for the Chuadanga-1 constituency in 1988.

== Early life ==
Shahjahan was born on 31 December 1935 in Alamdanga upazila of Chuadanga district. His father Khodadad Hossain, mother Shubhtara.

== Career ==
Mohammad Shahjahan was one of the local protesters in the language movement in 1952. In 1971 he was one of the organizers of the war of liberation. In 1972, the ILO He represented Bangladesh in the conference. He was elected to parliament from Chuadanga-1 as a Bangladesh Awami League candidate in 1988 Bangladeshi general election.
