= Hawli Union =

HawliUnion দামুড়হুদা ইউনিয়ন
- Union
- Hawli Union
- Location within Bangladesh
- Coordinates: 23.5626°N 88.7964°E
- Country: Bangladesh
- Division: Khulna
- District: Chuadanga
- Upazila: Damurhuda

Area
  - Total: 36.26 km^{2} (14.00 sq mi)

Population (2011)
  - Total: 40,012
  - Density: 1,103/km^{2} (2,858/sq mi)
- Time zone: UTC+6 (BST)
- Website: hawli.chuadanga.gov.bd

Hawli Union (Bengali: দামুড়হুদা ইউনিয়ন) is a union parishad of Damurhuda Upazila, in Chuadanga District, Khulna Division of Bangladesh. The union has an area of 36.26 square kilometres (14.00 sq mi) and as of 2001 had a population of 40,012. There are 14 villages and 7 mouzas in the union.
