= Kurulgachi Union =

Kurulgachi Union কুড়ুলগাছী ইউনিয়ন
- Union
- Kurulgachi Union
- Location within Bangladesh
- Coordinates: 23.5549°N 88.7286°E
- Country: Bangladesh
- Division: Khulna
- District: Chuadanga
- Upazila: Damurhuda

Area
  - Total: 36.26 km^{2} (14.00 sq mi)

Population (2011)
  - Total: 29,643
  - Density: 817.5/km^{2} (2,117/sq mi)
- Time zone: UTC+6 (BST)
- Website: kurulgachhi.chuadanga.gov.bd

Kurulgachi Union (Bengali: কুড়ুলগাছী ইউনিয়ন) is a union parishad situated at Damurhuda Upazila, in Chuadanga District, Khulna Division of Bangladesh. The union has an area of 36.26 square kilometres (14.00 sq mi) and as of 2001 had a population of 29,643. There are 13 villages and 9 mouzas in the union.
