= Damurhuda Union =

Damurhuda Union দামুড়হুদা ইউনিয়ন
- Union
- Damurhuda Union
- Location within Bangladesh
- Coordinates: 23.6065°N 88.7728°E
- Country: Bangladesh
- Division: Khulna
- District: Chuadanga
- Upazila: Damurhuda

Area
  - Total: 44.11 km^{2} (17.03 sq mi)

Population (2011)
  - Total: 34,231
  - Density: 776.0/km^{2} (2,010/sq mi)
- Time zone: UTC+6 (BST)
- Website: damurhuda.chuadanga.gov.bd

Damurhuda Union (Bengali: দামুড়হুদা ইউনিয়ন) is a union parishad of Damurhuda Upazila, in Chuadanga District, Khulna Division of Bangladesh. The union has an area of 44.11 square kilometres (17.03 sq mi) and as of 2001 had a population of 34,231. There are 19 villages and 9 mouzas in the union.
