= Raypur Union, Jibannagar =

Raypur Union রায়পুর ইউনিয়ন
- Union
- Raypur Union
- Location within Bangladesh
- Coordinates: 23.4445°N 88.9170°E
- Country: Bangladesh
- Division: Khulna
- District: Chuadanga
- Upazila: Jibannagar

Area
  - Total: 41.96 km^{2} (16.20 sq mi)

Population (2011)
  - Total: 11,948
  - Density: 284.7/km^{2} (737.5/sq mi)
- Time zone: UTC+6 (BST)
- Website: raypurup.chuadanga.gov.bd

Raypur Union (Bengali: রায়পুর ইউনিয়ন) is a union parishad of Jibannagar Upazila, in Chuadanga District, Khulna Division of Bangladesh. The union has an area of 41.96 square kilometres (16.20 sq mi) and as of 2001 had a population of 11,948. There are 8 villages and 7 mouzas in the union.
