= Hasadah Union =

Hashadah Union হাসাদাহ ইউনিয়ন
- Union
- Hasadah Union
- Location within Bangladesh
- Coordinates: 23.4113°N 88.8667°E
- Country: Bangladesh
- Division: Khulna
- District: Chuadanga
- Upazila: Jibannagar

Area
  - Total: 50.50 km^{2} (19.50 sq mi)

Population (2011)
  - Total: 22,260
  - Density: 440.8/km^{2} (1,142/sq mi)
- Time zone: UTC+6 (BST)
- Website: hasadahup.chuadanga.gov.bd

Hasadah Union (Bengali: হাসাদাহ ইউনিয়ন) is a union parishad situated at Jibannagar Upazila, in Chuadanga District, Khulna Division of Bangladesh. The union has an area of 50.50 square kilometres (19.50 sq mi) and as of 2001 had a population of 22,260. There are 12 villages and 9 mouzas in the union.
