= Uthali Union =

Uthali Union may refer to:

- Uthali Union, Jibannagar, a union in Jibannagar Upazila
- Uthali Union, Shivalaya, a union in Shivalaya Upazila
