= Nowlamary =

Coordinates: 23.6735°N 88.9889°E

Nowlamary Naolamari
- Village
- Interactive map of Nowlamary
- Country: Bangladesh
- Division: Khulna
- District: Chuadanga
- Upazila: Alamdanga
- Union Parishad: Khaskarara
- Ward: 1

Population
  - Total: 1,432

Naolamari (Bengali: নওলামারী) is a village in Khaskarara Union, Alamdanga Upazila, Chuadanga District, Bangladesh. The village has a population of 1,432 people.

== History ==
The meaning of this village is "to hit a nine" with the word Naola (নওলা) referring to a Nine in playing cards.

During the Bangladesh Liberation War of 1971, two notable freedom fighters of this village were Muhammad Rabiul Islam ibn Zahir Uddin and Muhammad Ajibur Rahman ibn Muin Uddin.

== Facilities ==
There are two mosques in the village; the Nowlamary Jame Masjid and the East Nowlamary Jame Masjid. The village has one eidgah; the Nowlamary Eidgah Maydan. The Nowlamary Sporting Club is the largest sports organisation in the village. The Nowlamary beel is a site of attraction. Educational institutions include the Nowlamary Alim Madrasa and Nowlamary Government Primary School. The village's Mawlana Arshadul Alam Orphanage and Lillah Boarding takes care of orphan children.

== Notable people ==
- Muhammad Masud Biswas, executive director for Bangladesh Bank
- Prof. Muhammad Mahbubur Rahman ibn Arshadul Alam of the Physics Department of Government K.C. College Jhenaidah
- Mawlana Arshadul Alam, Islam Preacher
- Mawlana Imdadul Haque, Islamic Scholar and Author
