= Monohorpur Union, Jibannagar =

Monohorpur Union মনোহরপুর ইউনিয়ন
- Union
- Monohorpur Union
- Location within Bangladesh
- Coordinates: 23.4614°N 88.8327°E
- Country: Bangladesh
- Division: Khulna
- District: Chuadanga
- Upazila: Jibannagar

Area
  - Total: 48.15 km^{2} (18.59 sq mi)

Population (2011)
  - Total: 15,266
  - Density: 317.1/km^{2} (821.2/sq mi)
- Time zone: UTC+6 (BST)
- Website: monohorpurup.chuadanga.gov.bd

Monohorpur Union (Bengali: মনোহরপুর ইউনিয়ন) is a union parishad situated at Jibannagar Upazila, in Chuadanga District, Khulna Division of Bangladesh. The union has an area of 48.15 square kilometres (18.59 sq mi) and as of 2001 had a population of 15,266. There are 7 villages and 5 mouzas in the union.
