= Gangni Union, Alamdanga =

Gangni Union গাংনী ইউনিয়ন
- Union
- Belgachi Union
- Country: Bangladesh
- Division: Khulna
- District: Chuadanga
- Upazila: Alamdanga

Area
  - Total: 20.06 km^{2} (7.75 sq mi)

Population (2011)
  - Total: 14,426
  - Density: 719.1/km^{2} (1,863/sq mi)
- Time zone: UTC+6 (BST)
- Website: gangniup.chuadanga.gov.bd

Gangni Union (Bengali: গাংনী ইউনিয়ন) is a union parishad situated at Alamdanga Upazila, in Chuadanga District, Khulna Division of Bangladesh. The union has an area of 20.06 square kilometres (7.75 sq mi) and as of 2001 had a population of 17,854. There are 13 villages and 10 mouzas in the union.
