= Makbul Hossain (Chuadanga politician) =

Bangladeshi politician

- মকবুল হোসেন

Member of Parliament for Chuadanga-1
- In office 1986–1988
- Succeeded by: Mohammad Shahjahan

Personal details
- Born: Chuadanga District
- Party: Jatiya Party

Makbul Hossain is a politician of Chuadanga District of Bangladesh and former member of parliament for the Chuadanga-1 constituency in 1986.

== Career ==
Makbul was elected a member of parliament from Chuadanga-1 constituency as an independent candidate in the third parliamentary elections of 1986. After that he joined Jatiya Party.
