= Banka Union =

Banka Union বাঁকা ইউনিয়ন
- Union
- Banka Union
- Location within Bangladesh
- Coordinates: 23.4210°N 88.8417°E
- Country: Bangladesh
- Division: Khulna
- District: Chuadanga
- Upazila: Jibannagar

Area
  - Total: 29.78 km^{2} (11.50 sq mi)

Population (2011)
  - Total: 17,435
  - Density: 585.5/km^{2} (1,516/sq mi)
- Time zone: UTC+6 (BST)
- Website: bankaup.chuadanga.gov.bd

Banka Union (Bengali: বাঁকা ইউনিয়ন) is a union parishad of Jibannagar Upazila, in Chuadanga District, Khulna Division of Bangladesh. The union has an area of 29.78 square kilometres (11.50 sq mi) and as of 2001 had a population of 17,435. There are 13 villages and 10 mouzas in the union.
