= Md. Ruhul Amin (Chuadanga politician) =

Bangladesh Jamaat-e-Islami politician

Members of Parliament
- Incumbent
- Assumed office 17 February 2026
- Preceded by: Md. Ali Azgar
- Constituency: Chuadanga-2

Personal details
- Party: Bangladesh Jamaat-e-Islami
- Occupation: Politician

Md. Ruhul Amin is a politician of Bangladesh Jamaat-e-Islami and an incumbent MP from the Chuadanga-2 constituency.
