= Shimanto Union =

Shimanto Union Parishad - Haripur সীমান্ত ইউনিয়ন পরিষদ - হরিপুর
- Union
- Shimanto Union
- Location within Bangladesh
- Coordinates: 23.4105°N 88.7863°E
- Country: Bangladesh
- Division: Khulna
- District: Chuadanga
- Upazila: Jibannagar

Area
  - Total: 115.15 km^{2} (44.46 sq mi)

Population (2011)
  - Total: 33,052
  - Density: 287.03/km^{2} (743.42/sq mi)
- Time zone: UTC+6 (BST)
- Website: shimanto.chuadanga.gov.bd

Shimanto Union Haripur (Bengali: সীমান্ত ইউনিয়ন হরিপুর) is a union parishad of Jibannagar Upazila, in Chuadanga District, Khulna Division of Bangladesh. The union has an area of 115.15 square kilometres (44.46 sq mi) and as of 2001 had a population of 33,052. There are 15 villages and 11 mouzas in the union.
