= Kalidashpur Union =

Kalidashpur Union কালিদাসপুর ইউনিয়ন
- Union
- Belgachi Union
- Location within Bangladesh
- Coordinates: 23.7677°N 88.9478°E
- Country: Bangladesh
- Division: Khulna
- District: Chuadanga
- Upazila: Alamdanga

Area
  - Total: 51.75 km^{2} (19.98 sq mi)

Population (2011)
  - Total: 14,426
  - Density: 278.8/km^{2} (722.0/sq mi)
- Time zone: UTC+6 (BST)
- Website: kalidashpurup.chuadanga.gov.bd

Kalidashpur Union (Bengali: কালিদাসপুর ইউনিয়ন) is a union parishad situated at Alamdanga Upazila, in Chuadanga District, Khulna Division of Bangladesh. The union has an area of 51.75 square kilometres (19.98 sq mi) and as of 2001 had a population of 23,344. There are 11 villages and 6 mouzas in the union.
