= Habibur Rahman (Chuadanga politician) =

Bangladeshi politician

Member of Parliament for Chuadanga-2
- In office 1988–1991
- Preceded by: Mirza Sultan Raja
- Succeeded by: Habibur Rahman

Personal details
- Born: Habibur Rahman Hobi
- Party: Bangladesh Nationalist Party; Jatiya Party
- Nickname: Hobi

Habibur Rahman Hobi is a politician of Chuadanga District of Bangladesh and former member of parliament for the Chuadanga-2 constituency in 1988.

== Career ==
Rahman was elected to parliament from Chuadanga-2 as a Jatiya Party candidate in 1988. He was defeated by Chuadanga-2 constituency as a candidate of Jatiya Party in the fifth parliamentary elections of 1991 and the seventh parliamentary elections of 12 June 1996. On 29 June 2011, he joined the Bangladesh Nationalist Party.
