= Jehala Union =

Jehala Union জেহালা ইউনিয়ন
- Union
- Jehala Union
- Location within Bangladesh
- Coordinates: 23.7177°N 88.8938°E
- Country: Bangladesh
- Division: Khulna
- District: Chuadanga
- Upazila: Alamdanga

Area
  - Total: 53.35 km^{2} (20.60 sq mi)

Population (2011)
  - Total: 18,230
  - Density: 341.7/km^{2} (885.0/sq mi)
- Time zone: UTC+6 (BST)
- Website: jehalaup.chuadanga.gov.bd

Jehala Union (Bengali: জেহালা ইউনিয়ন) is a union parishad of Alamdanga Upazila, in Chuadanga District, Khulna Division of Bangladesh. The union has an area of 53.35 square kilometres (20.60 sq mi) and as of 2001 had a population of 18,230. There are 15 villages and 12 mouzas in the union.
