= Karpashdanga Union =

Karpashdanga Union কার্পাসডাঙ্গা ইউনিয়ন
- Union
- Karpashdanga Union
- Location within Bangladesh
- Coordinates: 23.5736°N 88.7104°E
- Country: Bangladesh
- Division: Khulna
- District: Chuadanga
- Upazila: Damurhuda

Area
  - Total: 36.26 km^{2} (14.00 sq mi)

Population (2011)
  - Total: 41,086
  - Density: 1,133/km^{2} (2,935/sq mi)
- Time zone: UTC+6 (BST)
- Website: karpashdanga.chuadanga.gov.bd

Karpashdanga Union (Bengali: কার্পাসডাঙ্গা ইউনিয়ন) is a union parishad situated at Damurhuda Upazila, in Chuadanga District, Khulna Division of Bangladesh. The union has an area of 36.26 square kilometres (14.00 sq mi) and as of 2001 had a population of 41,086. There are 17 villages and 11 mouzas in the union.
