= Mirza Sultan Raja =

Bangladeshi politician

Member of Bangladesh Parliament
- In office 1986–1988
- Succeeded by: Habibur Rahman

Personal details
- Born: 4 September 1937
- Died: 17 November 2013 (aged 76)
- Party: Bangladesh Awami League
- Other political affiliations: Jatiya Samajtantrik Dal (Siraj)

Mirza Sultan Raja (4 September 1937 – 17 November 2013) was a Jatiya Samajtantrik Dal (Siraj) politician and a former member of parliament for Chuadanga-2.

== Career ==
Raja was a veteran of the Bangladesh liberation war. He was elected to parliament from Chuadanga-2 as a Jatiya Samajtantrik Dal candidate in 1986. He contested the 1996 and 2001 elections as a Bangladesh Awami League candidate but lost both elections.
