= First Capital University of Bangladesh =

- ফাস্ট ক্যাপিটাল ইউনিভার্সিটি অব বাংলাদেশ
- Motto: Knowledge & Technology
- Established: 2012; 14 years ago
- Chairman: Solaiman Haque Joarder
- Chancellor: President Mirza Fakhrul Islam Alamgir
- Vice-Chancellor: Moffajal Hossain
- Location: Chuadanga, Bangladesh; 23.6592°N 88.8624°E
- Website: fcub.edu.bd

First Capital University of Bangladesh is a private university in Chuadanga, Bangladesh. Established in 2012, it is the first private university in Khulna Division. Hazrat Al was appointed vice-chancellor in July 2018. The chairman is Solaiman Haque Joarder, the president of the district unit of the Awami League.

== Faculties and departments ==
- Department of Electrical & Electronic Engineering
- Department of Computer Science & Engineering
- Department of Business Administration
- Department of English
- Department of Law
- MBA (Master of Business Administration)
- Agriculture
- Department of Sociology
