= Uthali Union, Jibannagar =

Uthali Union উথলী ইউনিয়ন
- Union
- Uthali Union
- Country: Bangladesh
- Division: Khulna
- District: Chuadanga
- Upazila: Jibannagar

Area
  - Total: 145.04 km^{2} (56.00 sq mi)

Population (2011)
  - Total: 59,947
  - Density: 413.31/km^{2} (1,070.5/sq mi)
- Time zone: UTC+6 (BST)
- Website: uthaliup.chuadanga.gov.bd

Uthali Union (Bengali: উথলী ইউনিয়ন) is a union parishad situated at Jibannagar Upazila, in Chuadanga District, Khulna Division of Bangladesh. The union has an area of 145.04 square kilometres (56.00 sq mi) and as of 2001 had a population of 59,947. There are 19 villages and 15 mouzas in the union.
