= KDK Union =

KDK Union কেডিকে ইউনিয়ন
- Union
- Andulbaria Union
- Country: Bangladesh
- Division: Khulna
- District: Chuadanga
- Upazila: Jibannagar

Area
  - Total: 44.94 km^{2} (17.35 sq mi)

Population (2011)
  - Total: 16,090
  - Density: 358.0/km^{2} (927.3/sq mi)
- Time zone: UTC+6 (BST)
- Website: kdkup.chuadanga.gov.bd

KDK Union (Bengali: কেডিকে ইউনিয়ন) is a union parishad situated at Jibannagar Upazila, in Chuadanga District, Khulna Division of Bangladesh. The union has an area of 44.94 square kilometres (17.35 sq mi) and as of 2001 had a population of 16,090. There are 3 villages and 3 mouzas in the union.
