= Baradi Union, Alamdanga =

Baradi Union বাড়াদী ইউনিয়ন
- Union
- Baradi Union
- Location within Bangladesh
- Coordinates: 23.7533°N 88.8634°E
- Country: Bangladesh
- Division: Khulna
- District: Chuadanga
- Upazila: Alamdanga

Area
  - Total: 21.83 km^{2} (8.43 sq mi)

Population (2011)
  - Total: 21,370
  - Density: 978.9/km^{2} (2,535/sq mi)
- Time zone: UTC+6 (BST)
- Website: baradiup.chuadanga.gov.bd

Baradi Union (Bengali: বাড়াদী ইউনিয়ন) is a union parishad of Alamdanga Upazila, in Chuadanga District, Khulna Division of Bangladesh. The union has an area of 21.83 square kilometres (8.43 sq mi) and as of 2001 had a population of 21,370. There are 10 villages and 10 mouzas in the union.
