= Bhangbaria Union =

Bhangbaria Union ভাংবাড়ীয়া ইউনিয়ন
- Union
- Bhangbaria Union
- Location within Bangladesh
- Coordinates: 23.8075°N 88.8566°E
- Country: Bangladesh
- Division: Khulna
- District: Chuadanga
- Upazila: Alamdanga

Area
  - Total: 194.24 km^{2} (75.00 sq mi)

Population (2011)
  - Total: 14,426
  - Density: 74.269/km^{2} (192.36/sq mi)
- Time zone: UTC+6 (BST)
- Website: bhangbaria.chuadanga.gov.bd

Bhangbaria Union (Bengali: ভাংবাড়ীয়া ইউনিয়ন) is a union parishad of Alamdanga Upazila, in Chuadanga District, Khulna Division of Bangladesh. The union has an area of 194.25 square kilometres (75.00 sq mi) and as of 2001 had a population of 14,426. There are 6 villages and 3 mouzas in the union.
