= Mozammel Haque (politician, born 1928) =

Bangladeshi politician

Md. Mozammel Haque

Member of Parliament
- In office 1996–2006
- Preceded by: Habibur Rahman (Jamaat-e-Islami politician)
- Succeeded by: Md.Ali Asgar

Personal details
- Born: 1928 Chuadanga
- Died: 4 September 2017 (aged 88–89) United Hospital, Dhaka, Bangladesh.
- Party: Bangladesh Nationalist Party

Md. Mozammel Haque (1928–2017) was a Bangladesh Nationalist Party politician, industrialist, and member of parliament for Chuadanga-2. He is credited to have founded one of Bangladesh's first automated spinning mills, Tallu Spinning Mills. He was the chairman of Bangas-Tallu Group, one of Bangladesh's largest conglomerates and founded Bangladesh's first privately held radio station, Radio Today. Haque held considerable influence in the Bangladeshi Private Sector during the administration of Khaleda Zia.

== Career ==
Haque was elected to parliament from Chuadanga-2 twice, in 1996 and 2001 as a candidate of Bangladesh Nationalist Party. From 1990 to 2014, he was the president of Chuadanga District unit of Bangladesh Nationalist Party. He was the chairman of Mithun Knitting and Dying, Radio Today, and Tallu Spinning Mills. He remained in Bangas Ltd as its managing director. He was considered to be one of the closest advisors to Khaleda Zia.

== Death ==
Haque died on 4 September 2017 in United Hospital, Dhaka, Bangladesh. His funeral was held at the Jatiya Sangsad.
