= Bangladesh Jatiotabadi Krishak Dal =

Farmers wing of Bangladesh Nationalist Party

- বাংলাদেশ জাতীয়তাবাদী কৃষক দল
- Logo of Krishak Dal
- Formation: 30 December 1980 (45 years ago)
- Headquarters: 28/1, Naya Paltan, VIP Road, Dhaka
- Region served: Bangladesh
- Official language: Bengali
- President: Hasan Zafir Tuhin
- General Secretary: Shahidul Islam Babu
- Parent organization: Bangladesh Nationalist Party

Bangladesh Jatiotabadi Krishak Dal (Bengali: বাংলাদেশ জাতীয়তাবাদী কৃষক দল, lit. 'Bangladesh Nationalist Peasants Party') is the farmers wing of the Bangladesh Nationalist Party (BNP).

== History ==
Former Bangladeshi president and founding chairman of the BNP, Ziaur Rahman, established the Bangladesh Jatiotabadi Krishak Dal on 30 December 1980. The first convening committee was led by Justice Abdus Sattar.

In 1992, Abdul Mannan Bhuiyan and Shamsuzzaman Dudu were appointed the president and general secretary of Bangladesh Jatiyatabadi Krishak Dal.

On 16 May 1998, Krishak Dal committee was formed with Mahbubul Alam Tara as president and Shamsuzzaman Dudu as general secretary. But they joined the Awami League, and Mojibur Rahman was appointed the president. After Rahman's death, Mirza Fakhrul Islam Alamgir was appointed president, and is currently serving as the general secretary of the party.

Krishak Dal held its biennial conference in October 2003 in Nilphamari District. The conference was attended by the president of Krishak Dal, Mojibur Rahman, Asadul Habib Dulu, Mirza Fakhrul Islam Alamgir, and Shahrin Islam Tuhin. They criticised the Awami League and called former president Hussain Muhammad Ershad an emigrant from India and not a "son of the soil".

During the 1/11 crisis, in 2007, the president and organizing secretary of the Khulna District unit of Krishak Dal was arrested by the army.

Mokhlesur Rahman Bacchu, a Krishak Dal politician, joined the Awami League with 200 followers in 2015; he was facing charges of burning a police station in January 2014. The secretary of Krishak Dal, Shamsuzzaman Dudu, was arrested in April 2015. The vice president of the Krishak Dal Khagrachhari District unit, Nazrul Islam, was killed in December.

In 2016, Krishak Dal convener from Jessore District, Kamrul Hasan Nasim, tried to create a splinter faction of BNP called Ashol BNP (lit. 'Real BNP'). In January, Krishak Dal organized an event protesting the filing of a sedition case against former prime minister Khaleda Zia.

The Bangladesh Nationalist Party formed the new convening committee, which has 153 members, of Krishak Dal after a pause of 21 years with Shamsuzzaman Dudu as convener in February 2019. It organized protests demanding the release of chairperson Khaleda Zia. It dissolved the national committee and created a new one for Krishak Dal in 2021. There was some tension over Hasan Jafir Tuhin bringing in supporters from Pabna during the conference using four buses. Hasan Jafir Tuhin was made the president, and Shahidul Islam Babul was appointed the general secretary of Krishak Dal. A 231-member committee was created for Krishak Dal.

Krishak Dal leader Salah Uddin Khan filed a case against police officers and Awami League activists over the death of a Jubodal activist, Shahidul Islam, in September 2022.

== See also ==
- Bangladesh Jatiotabadi Matsyajeebi Dal
- Bangladesh Jatiotabadi Tati Dal
- Bangladesh Jatiotabadi Sramik Dal
- Agriculturists Association of Bangladesh
