= Dauki Union =

- Union
- Location within Bangladesh
- Coordinates: 23.7886°N 88.9598°E
- Country: Bangladesh
- Division: Khulna Division
- District: Chuadanga District
- Upazila: Alamdanga Upazila

Area
  - Total: 10.87 km^{2} (4.20 sq mi)

Population (2011)
  - Total: 17,319
  - Density: 1,593/km^{2} (4,127/sq mi)
- Time zone: UTC+6 (BST)

Dauki Union is a rural union under the Alamdanga Upazila of Chuadanga District in Bangladesh. The union is located about 30 kilometers east of Chuadanga town.

== Geography ==
Dauki Union is bordered by the Alamdanga Municipality to the north, the Hatboalia Union to the south, the Dohakula and Paschim Dighaldi Unions to the east, and the Jibannagar Upazila of Chuadanga District to the west. The union is situated at an average elevation of 14 meters above sea level and covers an area of approximately 10.87 square kilometers.

== Demographics ==
According to the 2011 Bangladesh census, Dauki Union had a population of 17,319, with a male-to-female ratio of 51.48:48.52. The literacy rate in the union is approximately 50.2%.

== Economy ==
Agriculture is the primary source of income in Dauki Union. The union is known for the production of various crops such as paddy, wheat, jute, and vegetables. Besides, the village produces many handicrafts like hand-loom sarees, Nakshi kantha, and bamboo products. There are also several small and medium-sized enterprises in the union.

== Transportation ==
Dauki Union is connected by roads to nearby towns and cities. The Alamdanga-Dohakula road passes through the union. Several local bus services operate in the area.

== Education ==
Dauki Union has several primary schools, one high school, and a madrasa.

== Healthcare ==
Dauki Union has one union health center and several private clinics. The union health center provides basic health services to the people of the union.

== Tourism ==
Dauki Union is home to a number of natural attractions. The most famous among them is the Dauki River, which attracts tourists throughout the year. Besides, the union has several historical mosques, including the Dauki Mosque, which is a popular pilgrimage site for Muslims.
