= Ailhash Union =

Ailhash Union আইলহাঁস ইউনিয়ন
- Union
- Ailhash Union
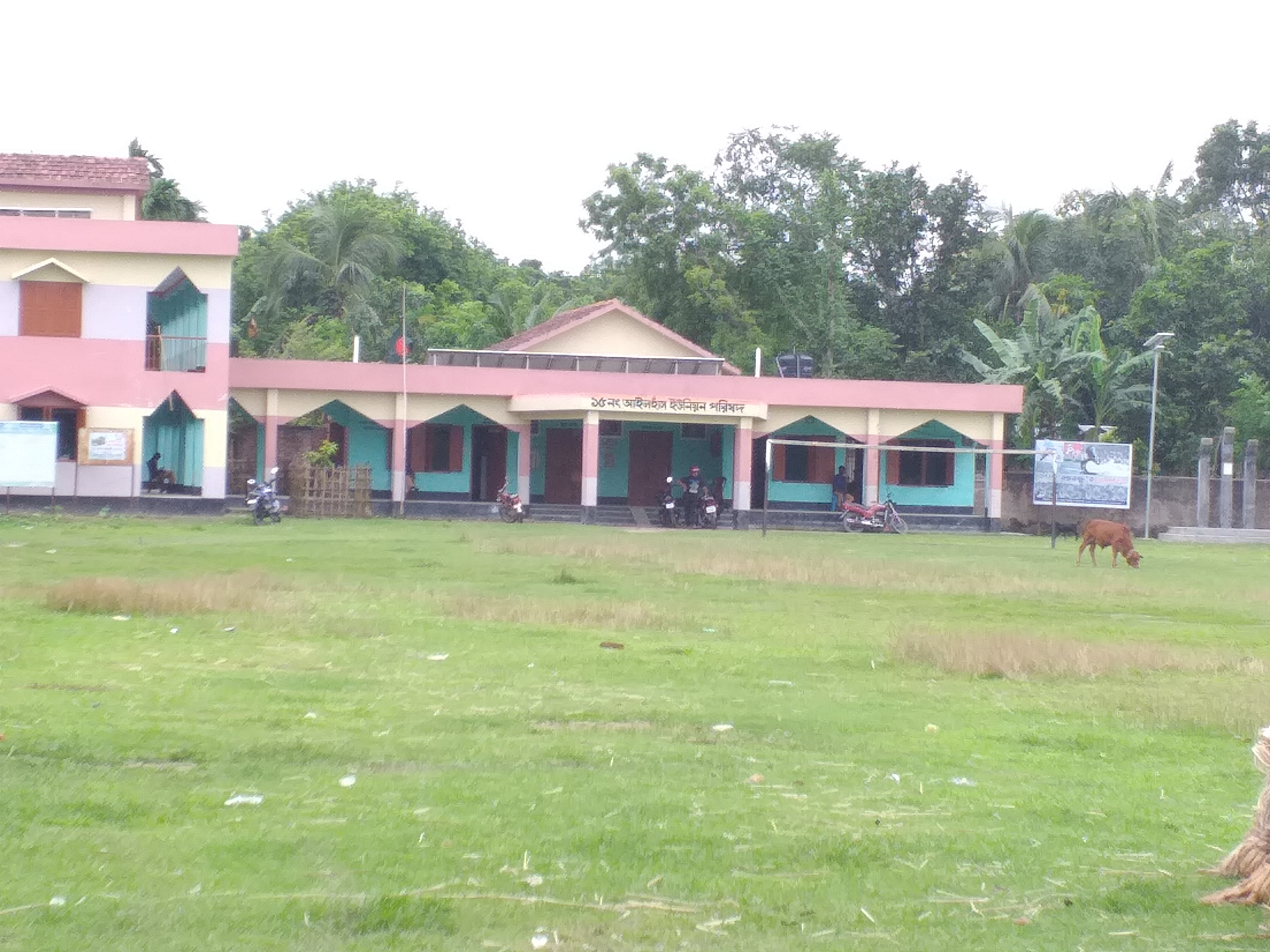
- Skyline of Mirpur upazila

- Location within Bangladesh
- Coordinates: 23.6753°N 88.9410°E
- Country: Bangladesh
- Division: Khulna
- District: Chuadanga
- Upazila: Alamdanga

Area
  - Total: 25.05 km^{2} (9.67 sq mi)

Population (2011)
  - Total: 15,766
  - Density: 629.4/km^{2} (1,630/sq mi)
- Time zone: UTC+6 (BST)
- Website: ailhashup.chuadanga.gov.bd

Ailhash Union (Bengali: আইলহাঁস ইউনিয়ন) is a union parishad of Alamdanga Upazila, in Chuadanga District, Khulna Division of Bangladesh. The union has an area of 25.05 square kilometres (9.67 sq mi) and as of 2001 had a population of 15,766. There are 17 villages and 11 mouzas in the union.
