= Ashab-ul-Haq =

Bangladeshi politician

Member of Bangladesh Parliament
- In office 1973–1976

Personal details
- Party: Awami League

Ashab-ul-Haq (Bengali: আসহাব-উল-হক) was an Awami League politician and a member of parliament for Kushtia-7.

== Early life ==
Haq was born on 4 December 1921 in Chuadanga District, Bengal Presidency, British India.

== Career ==
In 1970, Huq was elected to the East Pakistan Provincial Assembly. During the Bangladesh Liberation War, Haq served as the leader of the free Bengali administration in Kushtia District. He was the chief advisor to the Bangladesh Liberation Forces in the south-west region of Bangladesh. He carried a revolver made by Webley & Scott.

Ashab-ul-Haq was elected to parliament from Kushtia-7 as an Awami League candidate in 1973.

Haq was arrested on 17 August 1975, after the 15 August 1975 Bangladeshi coup d'état in which President Sheikh Mujibur Rahman was killed. In 1977, he was sentenced to five years in prison by a martial law court. He was released from prison in 1979, after which he left politics and resumed his medical career. He was one of the witnesses of the Jail Killing that took place in Dhaka Central Jail on 3 November 1975.

== Death ==
Ashab-ul-Haq died on 7 October 2010.
