= Jamjami Union =

Jamjami Union জামজামি ইউনিয়ন
- Union
- Jamjami Union
- Location within Bangladesh
- Coordinates: 23.7248°N 89.0059°E
- Country: Bangladesh
- Division: Khulna
- District: Chuadanga
- Upazila: Alamdanga

Area
  - Total: 58.38 km^{2} (22.54 sq mi)

Population (2011)
  - Total: 19,352
  - Density: 331.5/km^{2} (858.5/sq mi)
- Time zone: UTC+6 (BST)
- Website: jamjamiup.chuadanga.gov.bd

Jamjami Union (Bengali: জামজামি ইউনিয়ন) is a union parishad of Alamdanga Upazila, in Chuadanga District, Khulna Division of Bangladesh. The union has an area of 58.38 square kilometres (22.54 sq mi) and as of 2001 had a population of 19,352. There are 19 villages and 9 mouzas in the union.
