= Miah Mohammed Monsur Ali =

Bangladeshi politician

Mia Mohammad Mansur Ali

Member of the National Assembly of Pakistan
- In office 1965–1969

Member of Parliament for Kushtia-7
- In office 1979–1982

Member of Parliament for Chuadanga-1
- In office 27 February 1991 – 15 February 1996
- Preceded by: Mohammad Shahjahan
- Succeeded by: Shamsuzzaman Dudu

Personal details
- Born: 1 January 1930 Chuadanga
- Died: 3 October 2015 (aged 85) United Hospital, Dhaka
- Party: Bangladesh Nationalist Party
- Spouse: Nurun Nahar Begum
- Children: 3 sons and 2 daughters

Miah Mohammed Mansur Ali (1 January 1930 – 3 October 2015) was a Bangladesh Nationalist Party politician and member of parliament for Kushtia-7 and Chuadanga-1.

== Birth and early life ==
Miah Mohammed Mansur Ali was born on 1 January 1930 in Chuadanga. His father was Jasim Uddin Ahmed and his mother was Rahela Khatun.

== Career ==
Mansur Ali was elected MNA (Member of the National Assembly) from the present Chuadanga-Meherpur and part of Jhenaidah districts in the 1965–1969 term. In the second parliamentary elections of 1979, he was elected as a Member of Parliament from the Kushtia-7 constituency comprising the then Chuadanga subdivision as a candidate of the Bangladesh Nationalist Party. He was elected to parliament from Chuadanga-1 as a Bangladesh Nationalist Party candidate in 1991.

== Death ==
Miah Mohammed Mansur Ali died at United Hospital in Dhaka on 3 October 2015.
