= Kumari Union =

Kumari Union কুমারী ইউনিয়ন
- Union
- Belgachi Union
- Country: Bangladesh
- Division: Khulna
- District: Chuadanga
- Upazila: Alamdanga

Area
  - Total: 52.55 km^{2} (20.29 sq mi)

Population (2011)
  - Total: 17,131
  - Density: 326.0/km^{2} (844.3/sq mi)
- Time zone: UTC+6 (BST)
- Website: kumariup.chuadanga.gov.bd

Kumari Union (Bengali: কুমারী ইউনিয়ন) is a union parishad situated at Alamdanga Upazila, in Chuadanga District, Khulna Division of Bangladesh. The union has an area of 52.55 square kilometres (20.29 sq mi) and as of 2001 had a population of 17,131. There are 14 villages and 8 mouzas in the union.
