= Khadimpur Union =

Khadimpur Union খাদিমপুর ইউনিয়ন
- Union
- Khadimpur Union
- Location within Bangladesh
- Coordinates: 23.6906°N 88.8555°E
- Country: Bangladesh
- Division: Khulna
- District: Chuadanga
- Upazila: Alamdanga

Area
  - Total: 60.83 km^{2} (23.49 sq mi)

Population (2011)
  - Total: 14,426
  - Density: 237.2/km^{2} (614.2/sq mi)
- Time zone: UTC+6 (BST)
- Website: khadimpurup.chuadanga.gov.bd

Khadimpur Union (Bengali: খাদিমপুর ইউনিয়ন) is a union parishad of Alamdanga Upazila, in Chuadanga District, Khulna Division of Bangladesh. The union has an area of 60.83 square kilometres (23.49 sq mi) and as of 2001 had a population of 19,855. There are 15 villages and 12 mouzas in the union.
