= Saju Ahammed =

Bangladeshi dancer (born 1960)

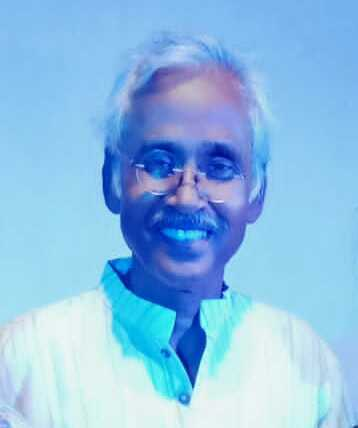
- Saju Ahammed
- Born: 1960 (age 65–66); Chuadanga District, East Pakistan
- Occupations: Dancer, teacher
- Known for: Kathak dancer
- Awards: Shilpakala Padak

Saju Ahmed (born 1960) is a Bangladeshi Kathak dancer. He received the Shilpakala Padak award from the Bangladesh Shilpakala Academy in 2022 for his contributions to dance.

== Early life ==
Ahmed was born in 1960 in Darshana, Chuadanga District, East Pakistan, to the family of Baharam Uddin Ahmed, a deputy superintendent of customs, and Anwara Khatun.

== Academic life ==
Ahmed passed from Customs Colony Government Primary School and joined Memnagar Bipradas (BD) Secondary School. From there, he completed secondary education and studied at Darshana Degree College. He studied at Bulbul Lalitkala Academy from 1984 to 1986. He studied Kathak dance in 1987 at the Delhi Kathak Centre. He was a disciple of Pandit Birju Maharaj.

Ahmed is currently the elected general secretary of the Bangladesh Dance Artist Association. Bulbul is the Kathak dance guru of Lalit Academy. He has been a resource person at Rabindra Srijanakala University since 2023.

== Dance ==
Saju Ahmed's notable works include Jenner's Karl, a dance drama based on the personal life of Karl Marx, and a dance drama based on Desh Bhag.

Ahmed and his dance troupe, Kathak Dance Community, have performed Kathak dance in various countries, including Japan, Malaysia, and Qatar. Ahmed has played a role in the inclusion of dance in the mainstream education program of Bangladesh. He holds dance festivals in the divisions of Bangladesh every year from 24 to 28 December.
