= Khashkorara Union =

Khashkarara Union খাসকররা ইউনিয়ন
- Union
- Khashkarara Union
- Location within Bangladesh
- Coordinates: 23.6515°N 88.9737°E
- Country: Bangladesh
- Division: Khulna
- District: Chuadanga
- Upazila: Alamdanga

Area
  - Total: 74.61 km^{2} (28.81 sq mi)

Population (2011)
  - Total: 28,508
  - Density: 382.1/km^{2} (989.6/sq mi)
- Time zone: UTC+6 (BST)
- Website: kashkoraraup.chuadanga.gov.bd

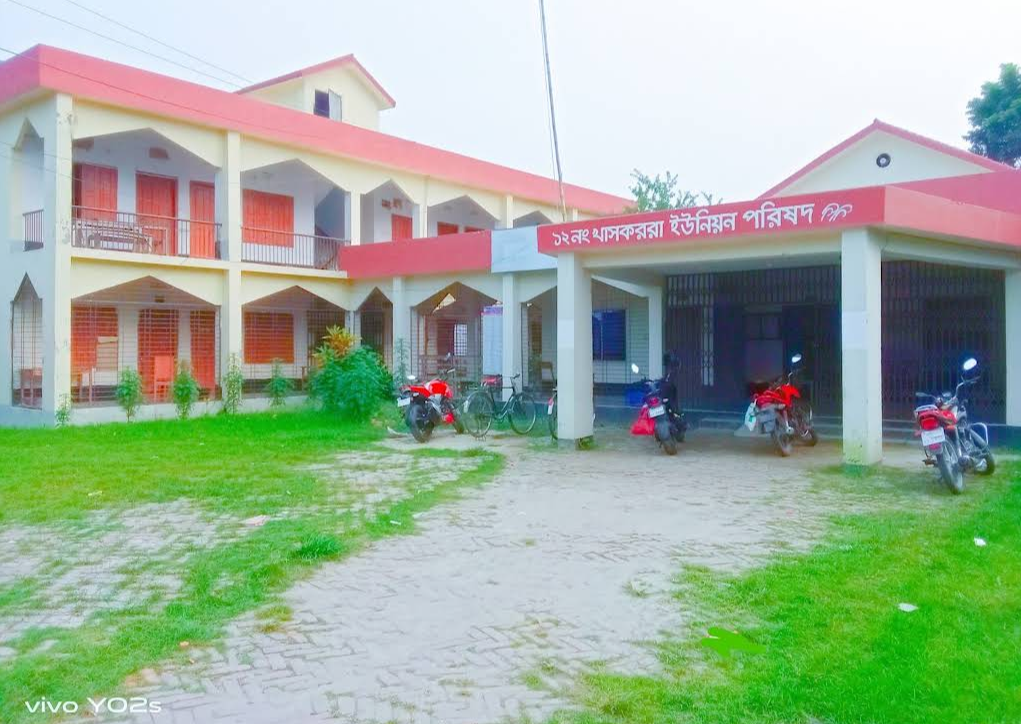
Khaskarra Union Parishad Building

Khashkarara Union (Bengali: খাসকররা ইউনিয়ন) is a union parishad situated at Alamdanga Upazila, in Chuadanga District, Khulna Division of Bangladesh. The union has an area of 74.61 square kilometres (28.81 sq mi) and as of 2001 had a population of 28,508. There are 13 villages and 9 mouzas in the union.
