= Belgachi Union =

Belgachi Union বেলগাছি ইউনিয়ন
- Union
- Belgachi Union
- Location within Bangladesh
- Coordinates: 23.7213°N 88.9525°E
- Country: Bangladesh
- Division: Khulna
- District: Chuadanga
- Upazila: Alamdanga

Area
  - Total: 52.68 km^{2} (20.34 sq mi)

Population (2011)
  - Total: 14,426
  - Density: 273.8/km^{2} (709.2/sq mi)
- Time zone: UTC+6 (BST)
- Website: belgachiup.chuadanga.gov.bd

Belgachi Union (Bengali: বেলগাছি ইউনিয়ন) is a union parishad of Alamdanga Upazila, in Chuadanga District, Khulna Division of Bangladesh. The union has an area of 52.68 square kilometres (20.34 sq mi) and as of 2001 had a population of 14,426. There are 6 villages and 3 mouzas in the union.
