= Shahidul Islam Biswas =

Bangladeshi politician

- সহিদুল ইসলাম বিশ্বাস

Member of Parliament, Chuadanga-1
- In office 1st
- In office 2001–2006
- Preceded by: Shamsuzzaman Dudu
- Succeeded by: Solaiman Haque Joarder

Personal details
- Born: 1948 Chuadanga
- Died: 11 November 2006 (aged 57–58) Ibn Sina Clinic, Dhaka, Bangladesh
- Party: Bangladesh Nationalist Party

Shahidul Islam Biswas (1948 – 11 November 2006) is a Bangladesh Nationalist Party politician and the former Member of Parliament from Chuadanga-1.

== Birth and family life ==
Shahidul Islam Biswas was born on 1948.

== Career ==
Biswas was a founding member of Bangladesh Jubo Dal. He was the General Secretary of Bangladesh Nationalist Party. He was elected to Parliament in 2001 from Chuadanga-1 as a candidate of Bangladesh Nationalist Party.

== Death ==
Biswas died on 11 November 2006 in Ibn Sina Clinic, Dhaka, Bangladesh.
