= Nagdah Union =

Nagdah Union নাগদাহ ইউনিয়ন
- Union
- Nagdah Union
- Location within Bangladesh
- Coordinates: 23.6803°N 88.9407°E
- Country: Bangladesh
- Division: Khulna
- District: Chuadanga
- Upazila: Alamdanga

Area
  - Total: 124.58 km^{2} (48.10 sq mi)

Population (2011)
  - Total: 43,201
  - Density: 346.77/km^{2} (898.14/sq mi)
- Time zone: UTC+6 (BST)
- Website: nagdahup.chuadanga.gov.bd

Nagdah Union (Bengali: নাগদাহ ইউনিয়ন) is a union parishad of Alamdanga Upazila, in Chuadanga District, Khulna Division of Bangladesh. The union has an area of 124.58 square kilometres (48.10 sq mi) and as of 2001 had a population of 43,201. There are 30 villages and 15 mouzas in the union.
