= Chitla Union =

Chitla Union চিৎলা ইউনিয়ন
- Union
- Chitla Union
- Location within Bangladesh
- Coordinates: 23.6936°N 88.8025°E
- Country: Bangladesh
- Division: Khulna
- District: Chuadanga
- Upazila: Alamdanga

Area
  - Total: 53.03 km^{2} (20.47 sq mi)

Population (2011)
  - Total: 22,613
  - Density: 426.4/km^{2} (1,104/sq mi)
- Time zone: UTC+6 (BST)
- Website: chitlaup.chuadanga.gov.bd

Chitla Union (Bengali: চিৎলা ইউনিয়ন) is a union parishad of Alamdanga Upazila, in Chuadanga District, Khulna Division of Bangladesh. The union has an area of 53.03 square kilometres (20.47 sq mi) and as of 2001 had a population of 22,613. There are 12 villages and 6 mouzas in the union.
