= Hardi Union =

Hardi Union হারদী ইউনিয়ন
- Union
- Hardi Union
- Location within Bangladesh
- Coordinates: 23.8010°N 88.9050°E
- Country: Bangladesh
- Division: Khulna
- District: Chuadanga
- Upazila: Alamdanga

Area
  - Total: 67.34 km^{2} (26.00 sq mi)

Population (2011)
  - Total: 29,554
  - Density: 438.9/km^{2} (1,137/sq mi)
- Time zone: UTC+6 (BST)
- Website: hardiup.chuadanga.gov.bd

Hardi Union (Bengali: হারদী ইউনিয়ন) is a union parishad of Alamdanga Upazila, in Chuadanga District, Khulna Division of Bangladesh. The union has an area of 67.34 square kilometres (26.00 sq mi) and as of 2001 had a population of 29,554. There are 16 villages and 9 mouzas in the union.
