= Md. Ali Azgar =

Bangladeshi politician

- মোঃ আলী আজগার

Member of the Bangladesh Parliament for Chuadanga-2
- In office 25 January 2009 – 6 August 2024
- Preceded by: Mozammel Haque
- Succeeded by: Md. Ruhul Amin

Personal details
- Born: September 15, 1964 (age 61)
- Party: Bangladesh Awami League

Md. Ali Azgar is a Bangladesh Awami League politician and a former member of Jatiya Sangsad representing the Chuadanga-2 constituency.

== Early life ==
Azgar was born on 15 September 1964. He completed his undergraduate in commerce.

== Career ==
Azgar was nominated to contest the Chudanga-2 seat by Bangladesh Awami League in 2008.
