= Habibur Rahman (poet) =

Bangladeshi poet and journalist

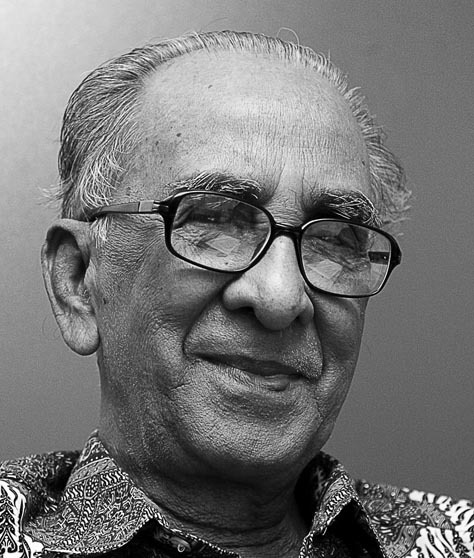
- Born: July 1, 1923; Bardhaman, West Bengal, British India
- Died: June 17, 1976 (aged 52); Dhaka, Bangladesh
- Education: Presidency College
- Occupations: Teacher, journalist, poet
- Writing career
- Language: Bengali
- Years active: 1943–1976
- Genres: Poetry, children's literature
- Notable works: *Agdum Bagdum* *Lej Diye Chena Jai*
- Notable awards: Bangla Academy Literary Award

Habibur Rahman (1923-1976) was a Bangladeshi journalist, poet and writer.

== Early life ==
Rahman was born on 1 July 1923 in Palishgram under Mongalkote Subdivision, Burdwan district, West Bengal. He graduated from Calcutta Hare School in 1940. He studied at Presidency College in Kolkata for a while before dropping out for financial reasons.

== Career ==
Rahman worked at a coal factory in 1943 in Asansol, after which he taught at the Calcutta Model High School. He joined The Azad in Dhaka in 1947 and moved to Dhaka after the Partition of India. In 1948, he became the assistant editor of The Azad. In 1951, he worked at The Daily Sangbad. He also worked for while at the weekly Kafela and Begum. He worked at the Saogat. From 1955 to 1956, he worked as a translator at Silver Burdett. He was awarded the Bangla Academy Literary Award in 1964. From 1959 to 1972, he worked at the United States Information Service. From 1973 to 1974, he worked at the Franklin Book Programs. From 1974 to 1976, he was the assistant director of the National Book Centre. He was the founding editor of the children's page of The Daily Sangbad. He wrote children's stories and young adult novels.

== Death ==
Rahman died on 17 June 1976 in Dhaka, Bangladesh.
