= Gangni Union =

Gangni Union may refer to:

- Gangni Union, Mollahat, a union in Mollahat Upazila
- Gangni Union, Alamdanga, a union in Alamdanga Upazila
