= Mrityukshuda (novel) =

Novel by Kazi Nazrul Islam

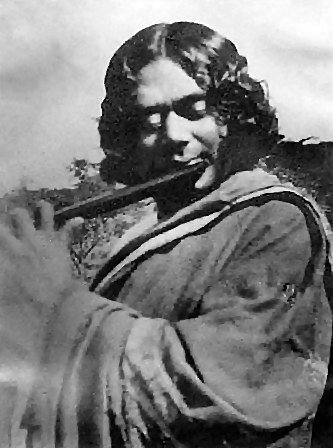
Kazi Nazrul Islam

Mrityukshuda (Hunger for Death) (1930) is a Bengali novel by Kazi Nazrul Islam. It is one of only three novels written by him. The author saw the Bolshevik Revolution in Russia, with its unapologetic enthusiasm for science and rationalism, as well as the possibilities it seemed to open up for normal, everyday people to create social justice and development for themselves, as profoundly attractive; the depiction of Ansar, a character in the novel, is a reflection of that. The novel has 28 parts. Ansar and Pakale are the main characters.
