= Shamsuzzaman Dudu =

Bangladeshi politician

- শামসুজ্জামান দুদু
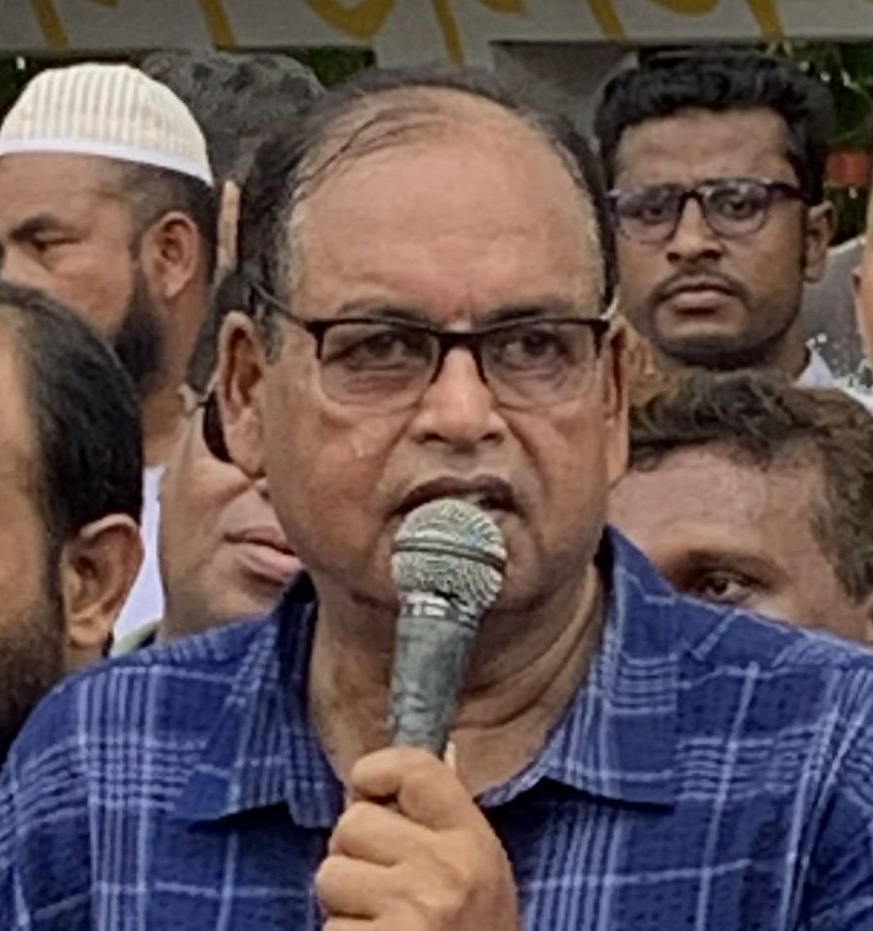
- Dudu in 2024

Member of Parliament
- In office 30 March 1996 – 15 July 2001
- Preceded by: Miah Mohammed Monsur Ali
- Succeeded by: Shahidul Islam Biswas
- Constituency: Chuadanga-1

Vice Chairman of Bangladesh Nationalist Party

Personal details
- Born: Chuadanga, East Pakistan
- Party: Bangladesh Nationalist Party
- Education: University of Dhaka

Shamsuzzaman Dudu is a Bangladesh Nationalist Party politician and a former member of parliament from Chuadanga-1. He is the vice-chairman of the Bangladesh Nationalist Party. He studied at Dhaka University and now is a member of the alumni association.

== Career ==
Dudu serves as the secretary of Jatiyatabadi Krishak Dal and as an adviser to Bangladesh Nationalist Party Chairperson Khaleda Zia. He was elected as an MP from the Chuadanga-1 constituency in 1996.
