= Alamdanga Upazila =

Alamdanga আলমডাঙ্গা
- Upazila
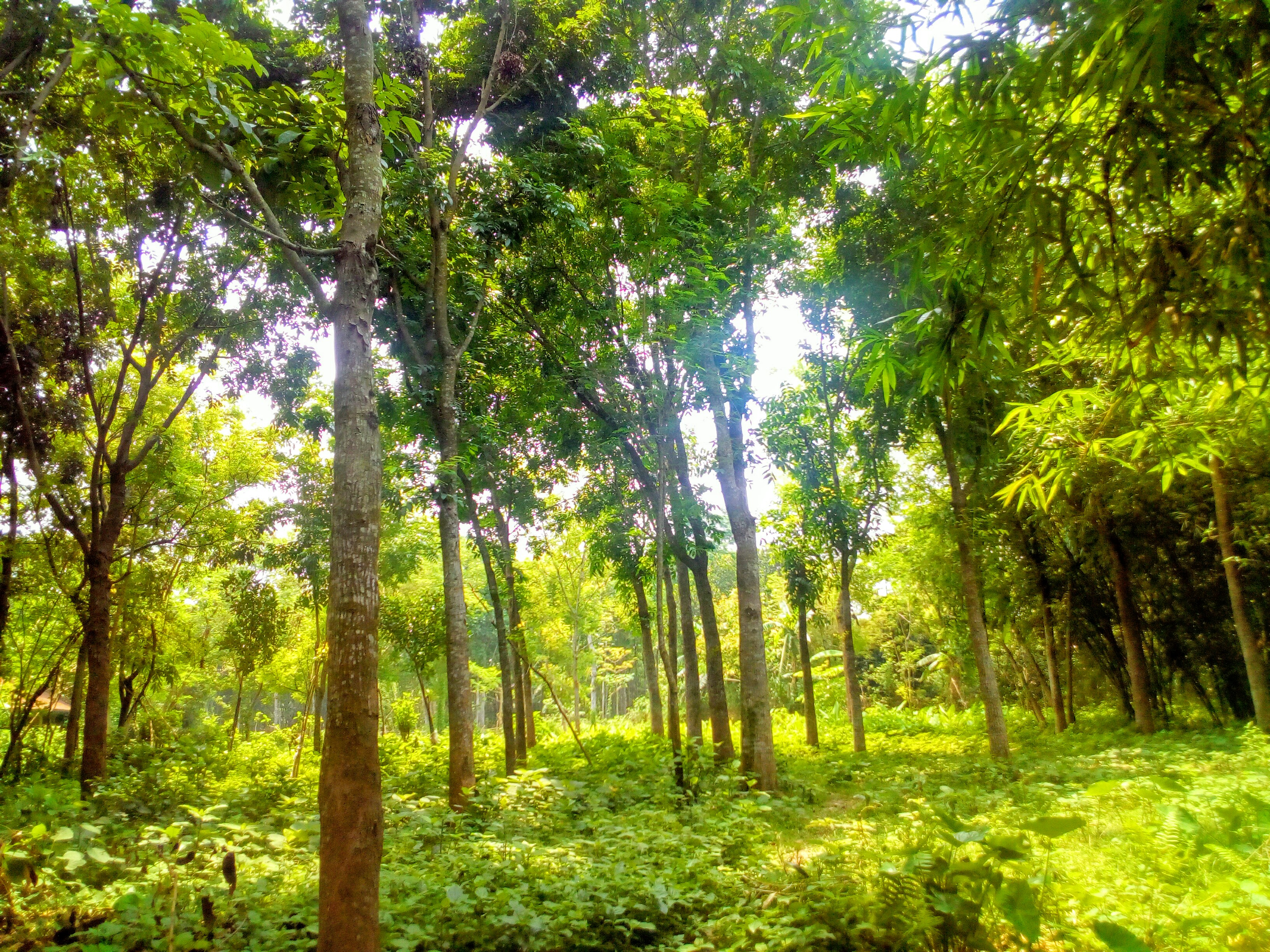
- Bhangbaria, Notun Para

- Coordinates: 23°45.5′N 88°57′E
- Country: Bangladesh
- Division: Khulna
- District: Chuadanga

Area
  - Total: 364.66 km^{2} (140.80 sq mi)

Population (2022)
  - Total: 368,189
  - Density: 1,009.7/km^{2} (2,615.1/sq mi)
- Time zone: UTC+6 (BST)
- Postal code: 7210
- Area code: 07622
- Website: Official Map of Alamdanga

Alamdanga Upazila mauza geocode map

Alamdanga (Bengali: আলমডাঙ্গা) is an upazila of Chuadanga District in Khulna, Bangladesh. It covers an area of 364.66 square kilometres (140.80 sq mi).

== Geography ==
Alamdanga is located at 23.7583°N 88.9500°E. It has 86,299 households and an area 364.66 km^{2}.

== Demographics ==
Historical population
Year	Pop.	±%
1981	202,489	—
1991	245,524	+21.3%
2001	308,917	+25.8%
2011	349,522	+13.1%
2022	368,160	+5.3%
Source: Bangladesh Bureau of Statistics

Religions in Alamdanga Upazila (2022)
Religion	Percent
Islam	97.52%
Hinduism	2.48%
Other or not stated	0.00%

According to the 2022 Bangladeshi census, Alamdanga Upazila had 99,903 households and a population of 368,189. 7.71% of the population were under 5 years of age. Alamdanga had a literacy rate (age 7 and over) of 68.70%: 69.66% for males and 67.79% for females, and a sex ratio of 95.23 males for every 100 females. 60,077 (16.32%) lived in urban areas.

== Administration ==
Alamdanga Thana was turned into an upazila in 1982 under Hussain Muhammad Ershad's decentralization programme.

Alamdanga Upazila is divided into Alamdanga Municipality and 15 union parishads: Ailhash, Belgachi, Baradi, Bhangbaria, Chitla, Dauki, Gagni, Hardi, Jamjami, Jehala, Kalidashpur, Khadimpur, Khashkorara, Kumari, and Nagdah. The union parishads are subdivided into 126 mauzas and 211 villages.

Alamdanga Municipality is subdivided into 9 wards and 18 mahallas.

=== Public Library ===
- Swayamvar Public Library

== Notable Person ==
- Mawlana Imdadul Haque, Islamic Scholar and Author

== See also ==
- Nowlamary
- Upazilas of Bangladesh
- Districts of Bangladesh
- Divisions of Bangladesh
