= Jibannagar Upazila =

Jibannagar জীবননগর
- Upazila
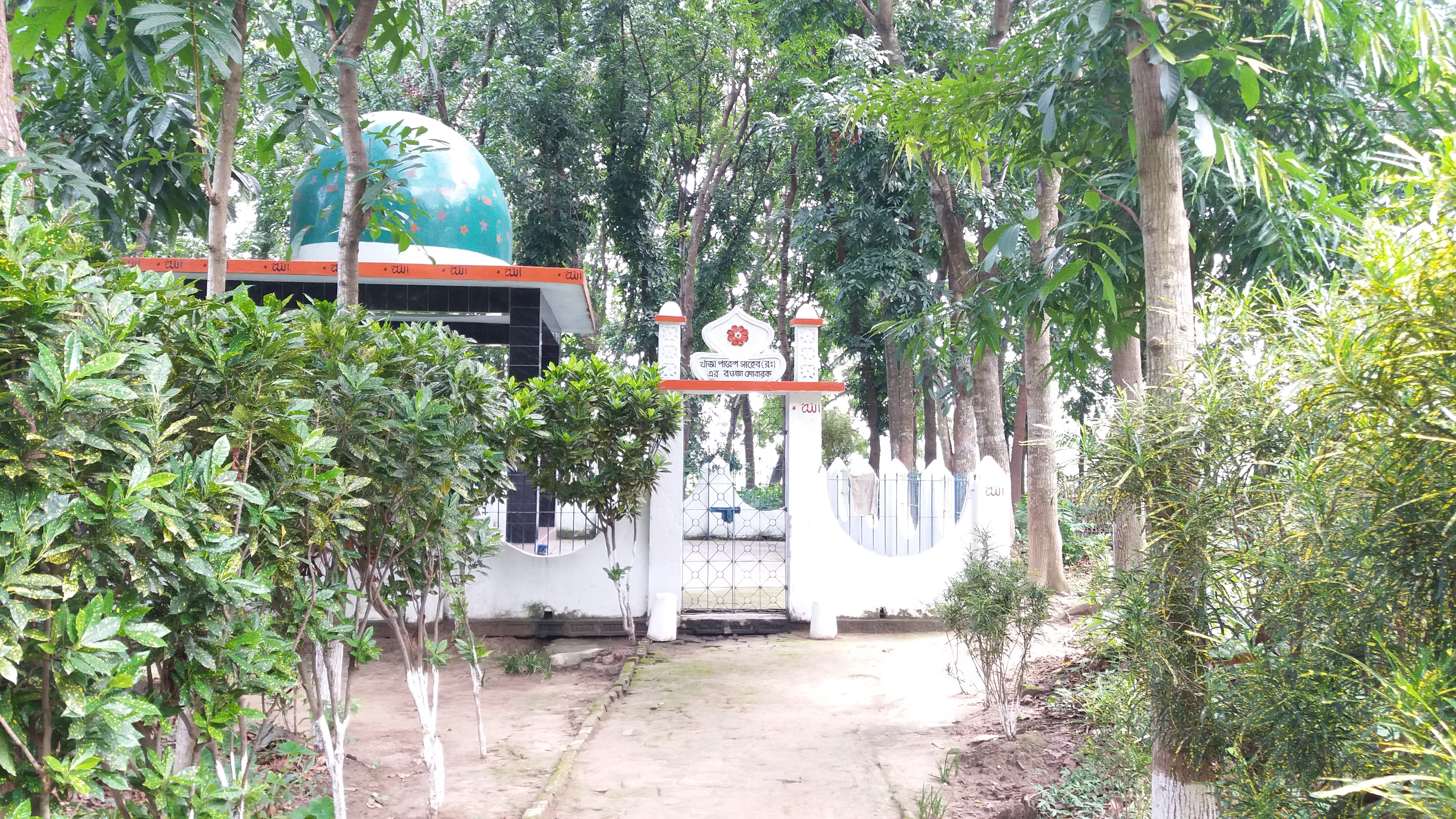
- Khaza Paresh Dargah

- Coordinates: 23°25′N 88°49.2′E
- Country: Bangladesh
- Division: Khulna
- District: Chuadanga

Area
  - Total: 199.25 km^{2} (76.93 sq mi)

Population (2022)
  - Total: 197,785
  - Density: 992.65/km^{2} (2,570.9/sq mi)
- Time zone: UTC+6 (BST)
- Postal code: 7230
- Website: Official Map of Jibannagar

Jibannagar (Bengali: জীবননগর) is an upazila of Chuadanga District in Khulna, Bangladesh.

== Geography ==
Jibannagar is located at 23.4167°N 88.8208°E. It has 44,185 households and total area 199.25 km^{2}. Jibannagar Upazila has an area of 199.32 km^{2}. The main rivers located in Jibannagar are Bhairab River and Kobadak River.

Jibannagar Upazila is bounded by Chuadanga Sadar Upazila on the north, Kotchandpur Upazila in Jhenaidah District, on the east, Maheshpur Upazila in Jhenaidah District, on the south, and Hanskhali CD Block in Nadia District, West Bengal, India, on the west.

== Demographics ==
Historical population
Year	Pop.	±%
1981	97,972	—
1991	125,102	+27.7%
2001	164,208	+31.3%
2011	179,581	+9.4%
2022	197,775	+10.1%
Source: Bangladesh Bureau of Statistics

Religions in Jibannagar Upazila (2022)
Religion	Percent
Islam	97.72%
Hinduism	2.28%

According to the 2022 Bangladeshi census, Jibannagar Upazila had 52,589 households and a population of 197,785. 8.54% of the population were under 5 years of age. Jibannagar had a literacy rate (age 7 and over) of 73.40%: 74.29% for males and 72.51% for females, and a sex ratio of 99.50 males for every 100 females. 33,455 (16.91%) lived in urban areas.

== Administration ==
Jibannagar, originally a Thana, was turned into an upazila in 1983.

Jibannagar Upazila is divided into Jibannagar Municipality and seven union parishads: Andulbaria, Banka, Hasadah, KDK, Raypur, Shimanto, and Uthali. The union parishads are subdivided into 76 mauzas and 82 villages.

Jibannagar Municipality is subdivided into 9 wards and 9 mahallas.

== Schools ==
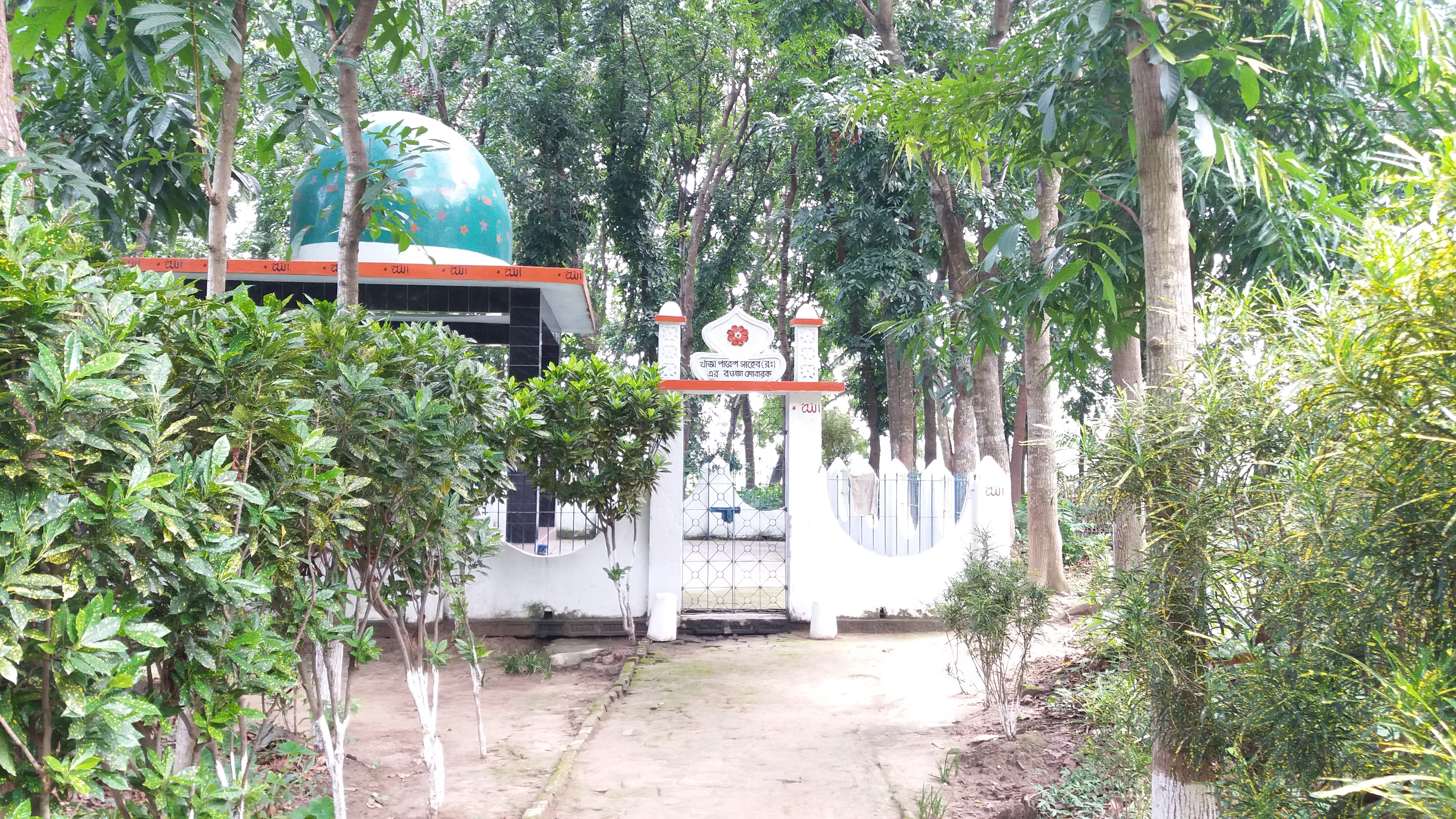
Dargah of Khwajah Paresh in Andulbaria Union

- Kashipur Secondary School
- Jibonnagar Thana Pilot Girls School
- Monohorpur secondary School
- B C K M P Secondary School
- Roypur Secondary School
- Hasadah Secondary School
- Uthali Secondary School
- Shaplakali Ideal School
- Jibannagar Degree College
- Jibannagar Girls' Degree College
- Dhopakhali High School
- Jibonnagar Thana Modal High School
- Karatoa High School
- Shahapur High school
- Minajpur Secondary school
- Rainbow Grammar School

== See also ==
- Upazilas of Bangladesh
- Districts of Bangladesh
- Divisions of Bangladesh
- Administrative geography of Bangladesh
