= Damurhuda Upazila =

Damurhuda দামুড়হুদা
- Upazila
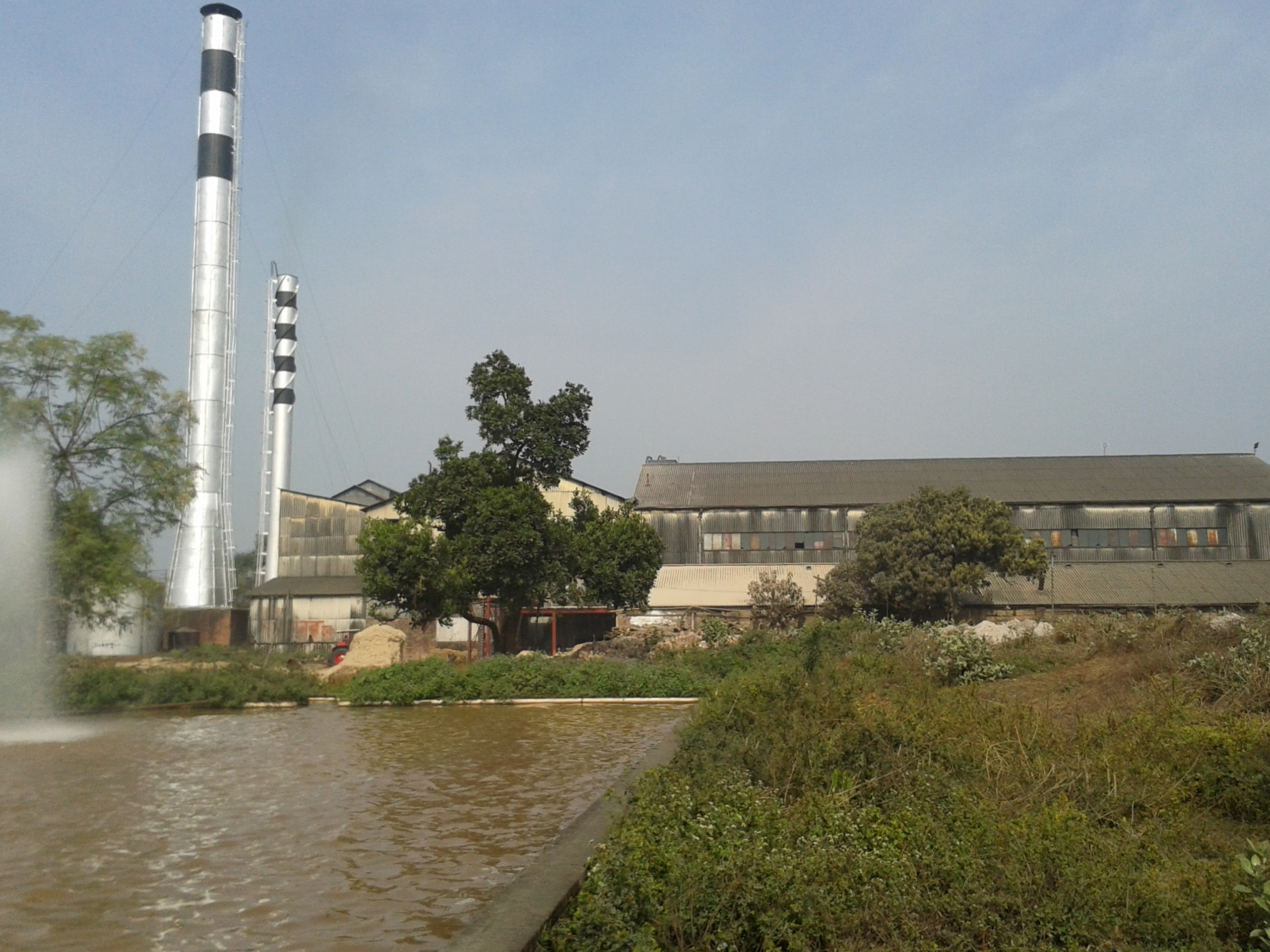
- Carew and Co. Distillery, Darshana

- Coordinates: 23°37′N 88°47′E
- Country: Bangladesh
- Division: Khulna
- District: Chuadanga

Area
  - Total: 311.92 km^{2} (120.43 sq mi)

Population (2022)
  - Total: 317,552
  - Density: 1,018.1/km^{2} (2,636.8/sq mi)
- Time zone: UTC+6 (BST)
- Postal code: 7220
- Website: damurhuda.chuadanga.gov.bd

Damurhuda Upazila mauza geocode map

Damurhuda (Bengali: দামুড়হুদা) is an upazila of Chuadanga District in the Division of Khulna, Bangladesh. Damurhuda Thana was turned into an upazila in 1983.

== Geography ==
Damurhuda is located at 23.6167°N 88.7833°E. It has 69,836 households and a total area of 311.92 km^{2} (120.43 sq mi).

Dumurhuda Upazila is bounded by Meherpur Sadar Upazila of Meherpur District and Alamdanga Upazila under Chuadanga District, on the north; Chuadanga Sadar Upazila on the east; Krishnaganj CD Block of Nadia District, West Bengal, India, on the south; and Chapra CD Block under Nadia district on the west.

== Demographics ==
Historical population
Year	Pop.	±%
1981	172,057	—
1991	213,291	+24.0%
2001	255,279	+19.7%
2011	289,577	+13.4%
2022	317,552	+9.7%
Source: Bangladesh Bureau of Statistics

Religions in Damurhuda Upazila (2022)
Religion	Percent
Islam	97.85%
Hinduism	1.70%
Christianity	0.44%
Other or not stated	0.01%

According to the 2022 Bangladeshi census, Damurhuda Upazila had 81,953 households and a population of 317,552. 8.51% of the population were under 5 years of age. Damurhuda had a literacy rate (age 7 and over) of 71.34%: 71.38% for males and 71.30% for females, and a sex ratio of 97.21 males for every 100 females. 91,845 (28.92%) lived in urban areas.

== Administration ==
Damurhuda Upazila is divided into Darshana Municipality and seven union parishads: Damurhuda, Hawli, Juranpur, Karpashdanga, Kurulgachhi, Natipota, and Perkrishnopur Madna. The union parishads are subdivided into 78 mauzas and 102 villages.

Darshana Municipality is subdivided into 9 wards and 21 mahallas.

== See also ==
- Upazilas of Bangladesh
- Districts of Bangladesh
- Divisions of Bangladesh
