= Chuadanga District =

Chuadanga District চুয়াডাঙ্গা জেলা
- District of Bangladesh
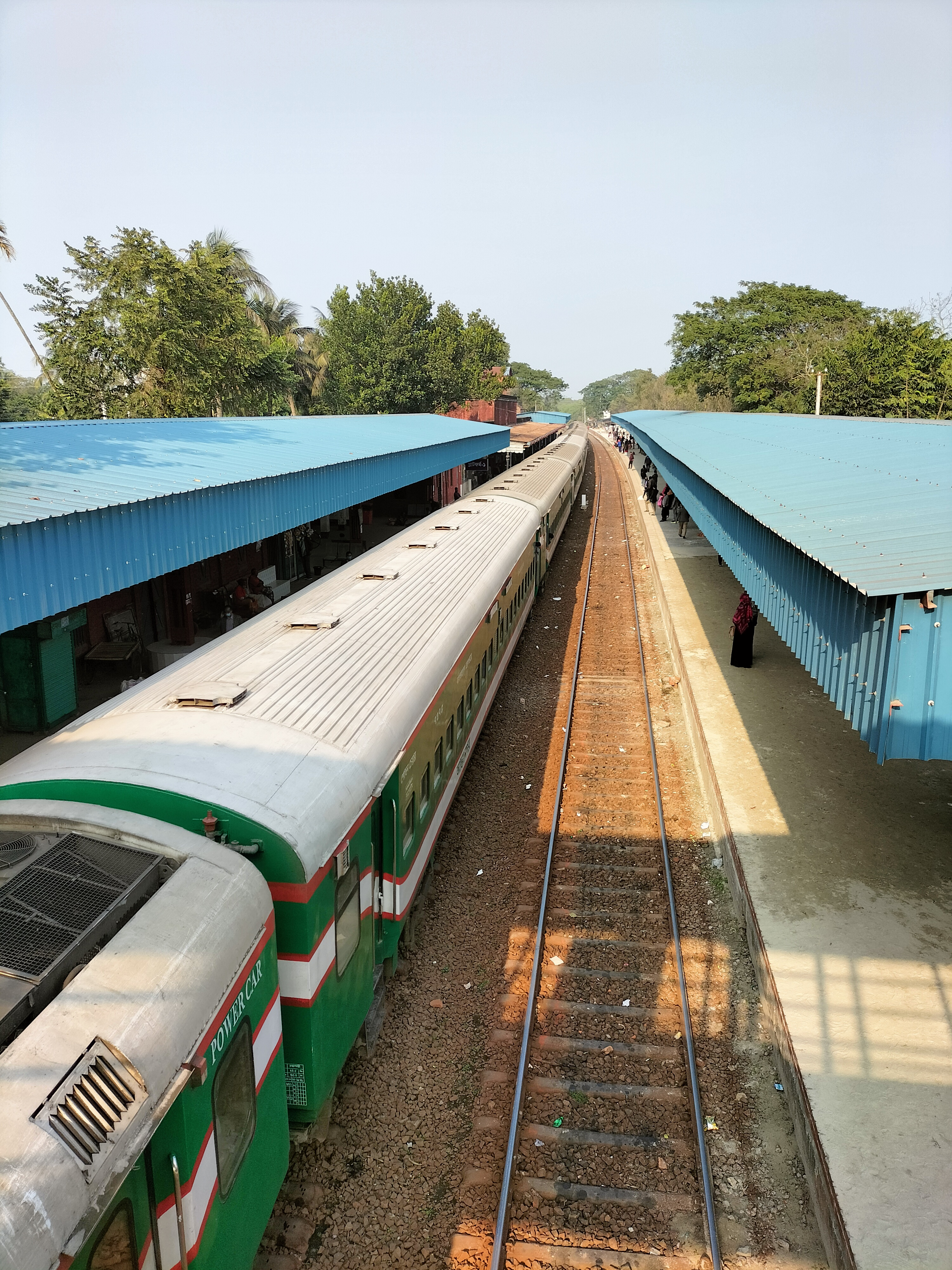
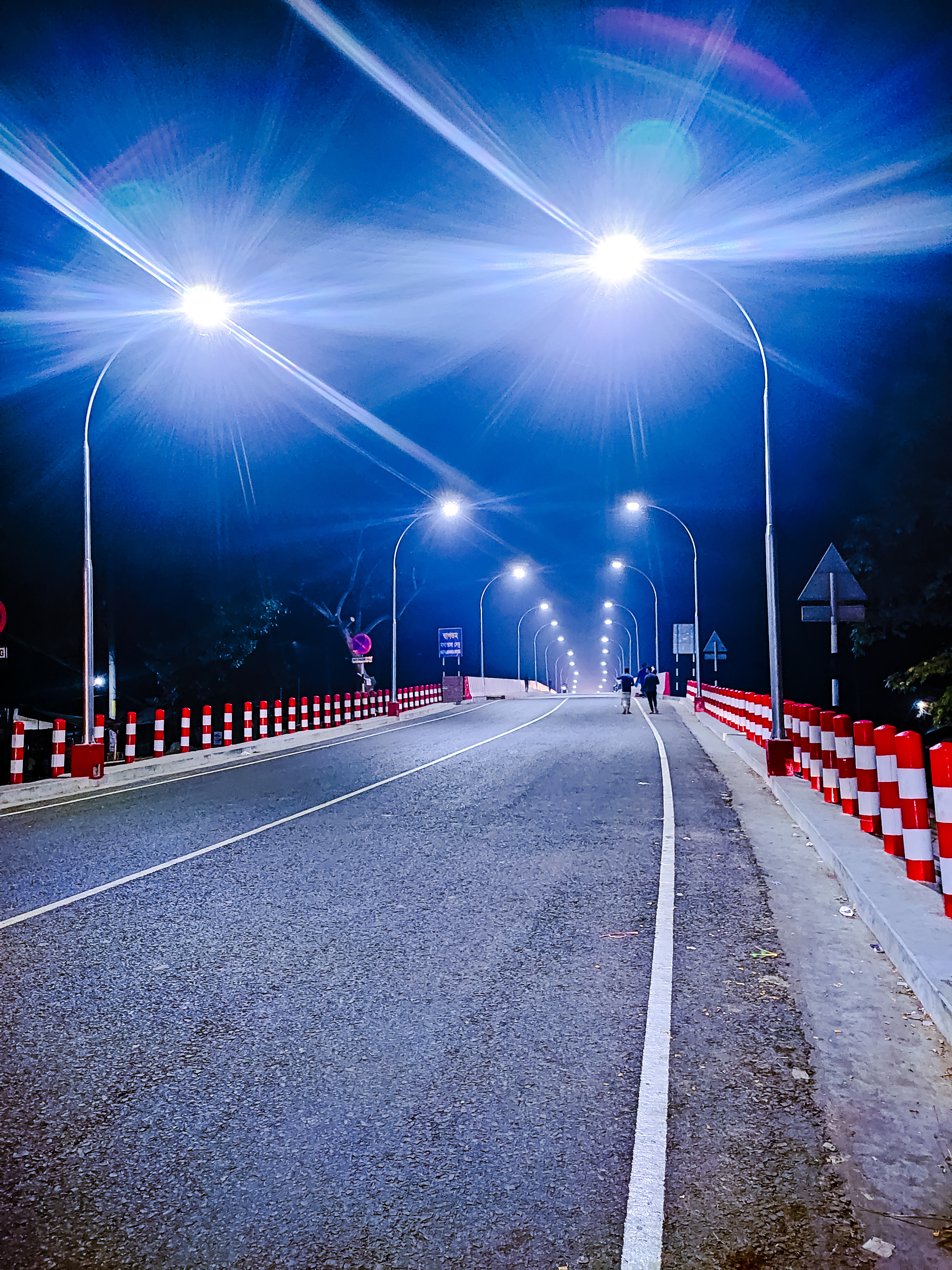
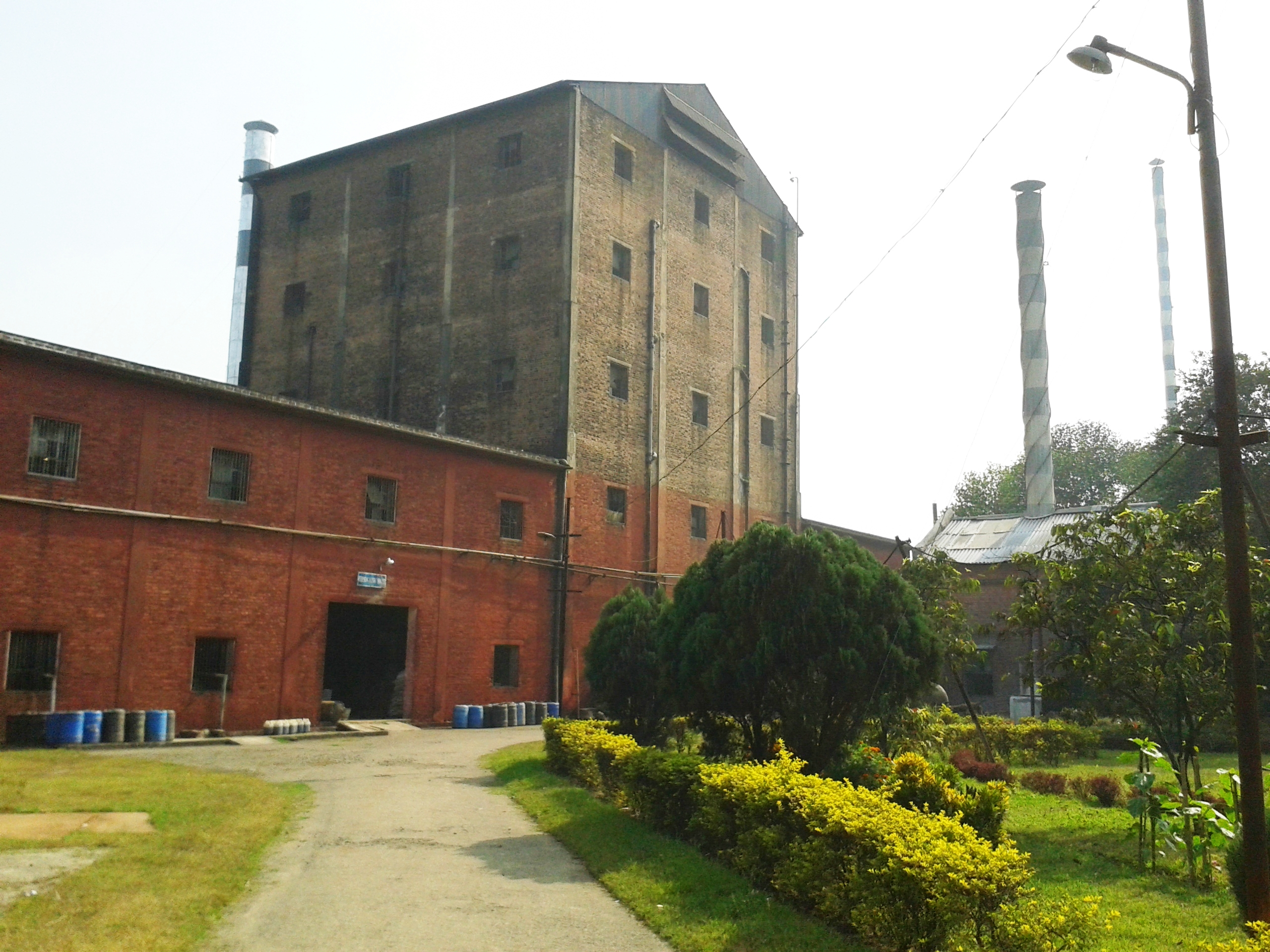
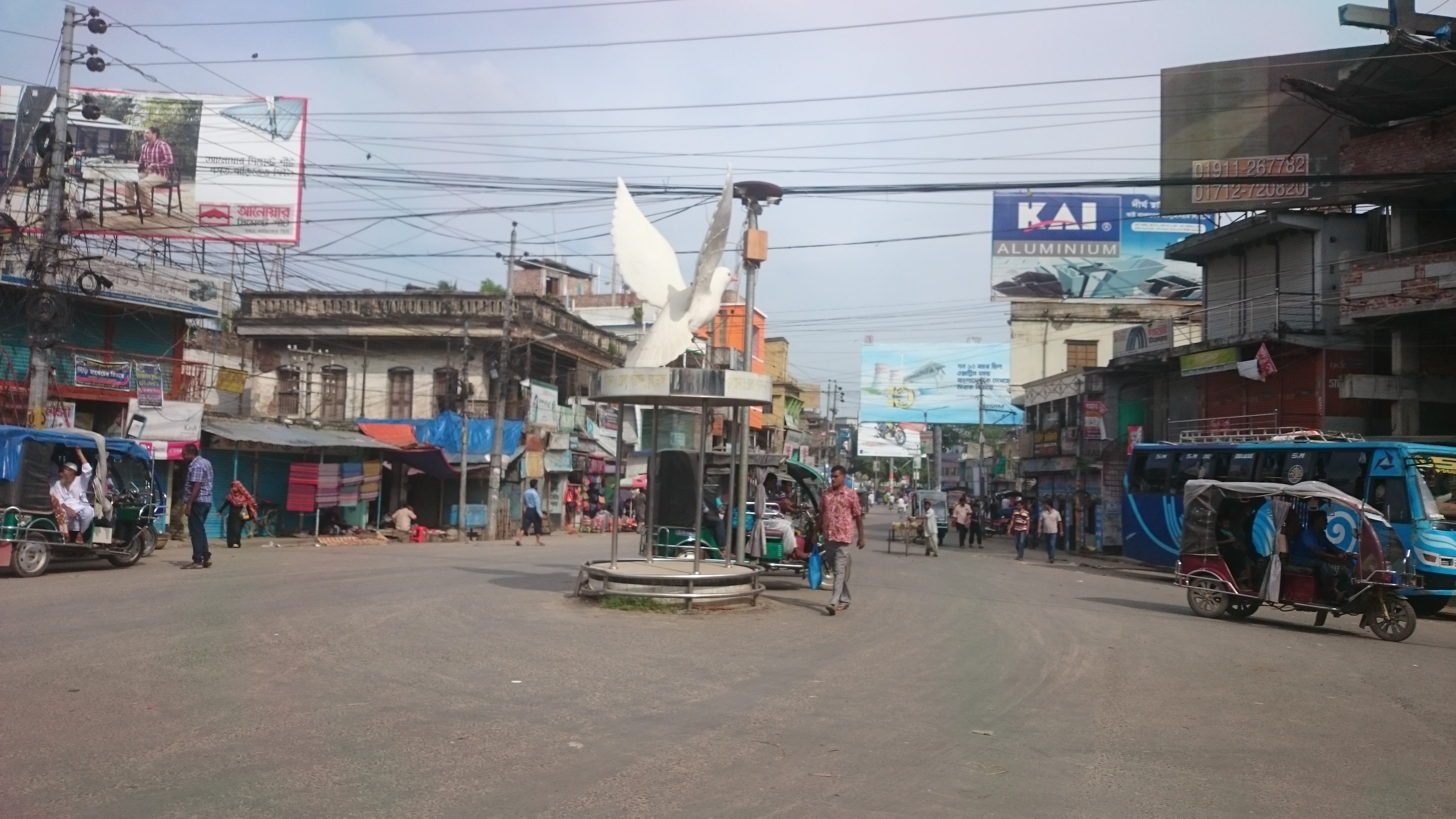
- From top, left to right: Chuadanga Railway Station, Mathabhanga Bridge over the Mathabhanga, Carew & Co, Courastar Mor .

- Location of Chuadanga District in Bangladesh
- Interactive map of Chuadanga District
- Coordinates: 23.60°N 88.70°E
- Country: Bangladesh
- Division: Khulna
- Headquarters: Chuadanga

Government
  - Deputy Commissioner: Kissinger Chakma

Area
  - Total: 1,174.10 km^{2} (453.32 sq mi)

Population (2022)
  - Total: 1,234,054
  - Density: 1,051.06/km^{2} (2,722.24/sq mi)
- Time zone: UTC+06:00 (BST)
- Postal code: 7200
- Area code: 0761
- ISO 3166 code: BD-12
- HDI (2019): 0.644 medium · 5th of 20
- Website: www.chuadanga.gov.bd

Chuadanga District (Bengali: চুয়াডাঙ্গা জেলা) is a district in south western Bangladesh, specifically Khulna Division, Bangladesh. It is bordered by the Indian state of West Bengal to the west, Meherpur District to the northwest, Jessore District to the south, Jhenaidah District to the east, and Kushtia District to the north. Before partition Chuadanga was one of the five subdivisions of Nadia district.

== History ==
According to the accounts of Greek historians and geographers and Ptolemy's map, the present-day Chuadanga district was in the immediate eastern part of the westernmost stream (Note: সম্ভবত ভাগীরথী). In this region, there existed a powerful kingdom called Gangariddhi and a notable city called Gange .

Some archaeological remains have been discovered by excavations in Chandraketugarh and its surrounding areas in the 24 Parganas district of the Indian state of West Bengal. Based on these archaeological remains, researchers believe that the present-day Bi-Ganga was the capital of the Gangariddhi kingdom mentioned in Greek history. Again, some archaeological remains from the 4th century have been discovered in Jessore and Gopalganj districts, and it has been possible to prove that Chuadanga district was a part of that ancient territory. Before the arrival of the Guptas, this region was probably ruled by the ruler of Pushkaranadhipati. In the 6th century, this region belonged to a different kingdom. The extent of this kingdom was from Comilla to the present-day state of Orissa in India. (Note: ষষ্ঠ শতকে লিখিত এক তাম্রলিপি গবেষণা করে এই তথ্য পাওয়া গেছে) This region was then known as Samatata or Banga.

Chuadanga was part of the kingdom of Shashanka from the first decade of the 7th century to the middle of the second century. The capital of this kingdom was Kansona in Murshidabad district. (Note: এই সম্পর্কে তেমন কোনো নির্ভরযোগ্য প্রমাণ পাওয়া যায় নি এখন পর্যন্ত)

During the reign of Ballal Sen (1160 - 1178), Chuadanga was under the Sena kingdom. After his death, his son Lakshman Sen became king. After that, the kings of the Sena dynasty ruled for a short time. During the reign of Lakshman Sen, Ikhtiyar Uddin attacked the then summer capital of the Sena kingdom, "Naudih" (Note: অনেকে এটিকে বর্তমান নদিয়া বলে মনে করেন। তবে ইতিহাসবিদগণ এতে একমত হতে পারেননি।) , and occupied this region. But he could not establish Muslim rule. Chuadanga was not under Muslim rule during the subsequent reigns either.

In 1281 AD, the Sultan of Delhi, Ghiyasuddin Balban, defeated and killed Mughisuddin Toghari, the ruler of Bengal, and annexed the entire Bangladesh, including present-day Chuadanga, to his empire. Chuadanga district was under Sultanate rule until 1414. Later, during the reign of the Shah and the Habshi Sultans, Chuadanga was under their rule. In 1576, when Dawood Karrani was defeated and killed by the Mughal army, Bengal came under Mughal rule. In 1695, Shobha Singh, the landlord of Medinipur, and an Afghan chieftain, Rahim Khan, took up arms against the Mughal power in southwestern Bengal. They were able to drive the Mughal army from southwestern Bengal, including Chuadanga.

During the reign of King Laxman Sen, Ikhtiyar Uddin Mohammad Bakhtiyar Khilji attacked Nabadwip and occupied most of Nadia. After the occupation of Nabadwip by Bangladesh, many missionaries arrived in this country. During this time, many dervishes arrived around Chuadanga. They came and started preaching Islam. Their graves still exist in various places.

Later, it came under the rule of Pratap Aditya, one of the Bar Bhuiyan kings of Bengal. Some time later, it came under the rule of the Mughal Empire. The Mughals leased this area to Bhavananda Majumdar, the founder of the Nadia dynasty. Bhavananda's descendant Krishnachandra Roy became the king of Nadia in 1728. At that time, many places in Chuadanga were part of the zamindari of Rani Bhabani.

Meanwhile, taking advantage of the weakness of the Mughals, Subadar Murshid Quli ruled Bengal almost independently. Then Shuja Uddin and Sarfaraz Khan became the Subadars of Bengal. At this time, chaos prevailed in the state, and Alivardi Khan seized the throne of Bengal. During Alivardi Khan's reign, many people, tired of the bargi attacks, left Murshidabad and settled around Chuadanga. When peace returned to the country, many stayed here permanently.

After the fall of Siraj-ud-Daula in 1757, more people came here in fear of their lives and started living in different places. The population of the area gradually increased. In 1765, the East India Company obtained the Diwan of Bengal, Bihar, Odissa. Later, on the proposal of Sir John Shoaib, the Collector system was introduced to facilitate the collection of revenue. At this time, Nadia district was first formed. It was in 1787.

After the conquest of Nabadwip by Ikhtiyar Uddin Mohammad Bakhtiyar Khalji, numerous saints, dervishes and common people started coming to Chuadanga. During the reign of Alivardi Khair, many people, who were disturbed by the bargi attacks, came to Chuadanga by river and started living locally. In 1730, Marwaris from Madras settled in Chuadanga to run businesses. In 1740, during the reign of Nawab Alivardi Khar, Chungo Mallik settled with his family along the Mathabhanga river from Itebari Maharajpur on the border of Murshidabad district. After he settled, the population of this city started to increase gradually. At that time, more people used to travel by water.

Nadia district was formed on 21 March 1787. During the rule of the East India Company, the Kushtia region including Chuadanga, was part of Rajshahi district. The Sepoy Mutiny occurred in 1857 and the Indigo Rebellion in 1860/61. At this time, Nadia district was divided into four subdivisions for the suppression of the Indigo Rebellion and for administrative purposes. These were Krishnanagar, Ranaghat, Chuadanga and Meherpur. When the railway was opened in Kushtia in 1864, Kushtia subdivision was added to Nadia district from Pabna district as the 5th subdivision. After the establishment of Chuadanga subdivision in 1861, H.J.S. Cotton became the first subdivision administrator. The headquarters of the first subdivision was Damurhuda.

In 1859, the Eastern Bengal Railway Company started the construction of the Kolkata-Kushtia railway line. In order to establish communication between Kolkata and the then Meherpur subdivision of Nadia district and the Jhenaidah subdivision of Jessore district, the first railway station of Bangladesh, Chuadanga Railway Station, was established in 1859 at Chuadanga, in the middle of the two subdivisions. Chuadanga Railway Station was opened on 15 November 1862. When Chuadanga Railway Station was opened, the subdivision headquarters was shifted from Damurhuda to Chuadanga in 1862. As a result, Chuadanga emerged as an important subdivision and major business centre of Nadia district.

During the British rule, this area became the center of several movements; such as: Wahhabi Movement (1831), Faraiji Movement (1838-47), Sepoy Mutiny (1857), Indigo Mutiny (1859-60), Khilafat Movement (1920), Swadeshi Movement (1906), Non-Cooperation Movement, Satyagraha Movement (1920-40), Quit India Movement and August Revolt(1942), etc.

When the country was partitioned in 1947, Nadia district was also divided. At the time of partition, except for Krishnanagar police station (now part of Nadia district), the two police stations of Chuadanga, Kushtia and Meherpur subdivisions fell into East Pakistan. Kushtia was formed by combining the three subdivisions.

During the Liberation War, there were several frontal battles and partial battles between the Pakistani forces and the Mukti Pagal soldiers. More than a hundred battles were fought here. On March 26, 1971, the first command of the Liberation War, the South Western Command, was formed in this district. The headquarters of Sector No. 8 of the Liberation War was the 4th EPR Headquarters in Chuadanga Sadar. The 4th EPR was led by Major Abu Osman Chowdhury and Dr. Ashab-ul-Haq Joarddar. On the same day, at 09:30 in the morning, Dr Ashab-ul-Haq Joarddar first declared rebellion and all-out war against the Pakistani forces at the Barabazar intersection. On August 5, 1971, 8 Muktis were killed in a frontal battle with Pakistani forces in Jagannathpur village of Damurhuda upazila of the district. Later, a memorial was built in Janagannathpur village in honour of the 8 deceased. Which is currently known as 8 graves.

During the Liberation War, on 10 April, the Bangladesh government in exile declared Chuadanga the temporary capital of the People's Republic of Bangladesh. On 14 April, the Mujibnagar government was scheduled to be sworn in at Chuadanga, but the Pakistani military, upon learning of the swearing-in ceremony, bombed Chuadanga from warplanes. Later, considering security concerns, the Mujibnagar government's swearing-in ceremony was held at Baiddanath Tola in the then Meherpur subdivision, now Mujibnagar. To prevent the swearing-in of the first President and Prime Minister of Bengal, the Mathabhanga Bridge connecting the two districts was blown up by bombs. During the Liberation War, there are records of more than a hundred frontal battles between the Pakistani army and the Mukti Bahini in Chuadanga. According to records, Chuadanga was liberated from the Pakistanis on 7 December 1971, nine days before the invading army surrendered to the Allies.

After the country's independence, the first temporary capital was also established in Chuadanga district. The Bangladesh Red Cross Society was also established here, and the first postal department and telecommunication system of independent Bangladesh were also established in this district. The only two-story railway station in Bangladesh is also located in Alamdanga, Chuadanga. In addition, the birth of NN Saha, the author of the national monogram of Bangladesh, has enriched this district several times. The birthplace of the Ekushey Padak-winning Baul saint, the late Khodabox Shah, is also in Chuadanga.

There are reminders of the wartime massacres and destruction - three mass graves behind Chuadanga Sadar Hospital, behind Natudah High School, in the border village of Dhopakhali in Jibannagar, and on the banks of the Ganga-Kapotaksha Canal near Alamdanga Railway Station. Two memorial pillars stand commemorating the war.

On 1 February 1984, the Chuadanga subdivision was abolished. On 26 February of that year, Chuadanga was elevated to the status of a district. Azizul Haque Bhuiyan was appointed as the first Deputy Commissioner. At this time, four police stations of Chuadanga subdivision were upgraded to upazilas. The police stations were Alamdanga, Jibannagar, Damurhuda and Chuadanga.

== Naming ==
According to Greek historians, the famous Gangaridai (Gangariddhi) kingdom was located in this area. It is also rumoured that a city named Gangeya was located in Chuadanga. Regarding the naming of Chuadanga, it is said that the place was named after Chungo Mallik, the ancestor of the local Mallik family. Around 1740 AD, Chungo Mallik first settled here with his wife, three sons, and one daughter, coming from the village of Itabari-Maharajpur on the border of Nadia and Murshidabad districts of India via the Mathabhanga river route. In a 1797 record, the name of the place is mentioned as Chungodanga. The current name, Chuadanga, came about due to the distortion of pronunciation during translation from Persian to English. Two more possible reasons for the naming of Chuadanga are prevalent. The word Chua<Chaya<Chasha means clean. The naming could also be in the sense of a clean high ground (danga). Again, many believe that there were many rats in this region. Rats are called "chuha" in Hindi. Perhaps the word Chuhadanga was slightly changed to become the name Chuadanga.

== Geography ==
Chuadanga district has an area of 1,157.42 km^{2}. It shares domestic borders with the Kushtia District on the northeast, Meherpur on the northwest, and Jhenaidah on the south and southeast. On its southwest lies the Nadia District (in the state of West Bengal in India). In January 2018, the district had the lowest temperature in Bangladesh.

== Administration ==
Chuadanga District upazila geocode map

Until the Partition of India in 1947, Chuadanga sub-division was within Nadia district.

Deputy Commissioner (DC): Mohammad Aminul Islam Khan

=== Subdistricts ===
Chuadanga district is divided into four Upazilas, which run cities of the same name.

- Chuadanga Sadar Upazila
- Alamdanga Upazila
- Jibannagar Upazila
- Damurhuda Upazila

== Demographics ==
Historical population
Year	Pop.	±% p.a.
1981	654,135	—
1991	807,164	+2.12%
2001	1,007,130	+2.24%
2011	1,129,015	+1.15%
2022	1,234,054	+0.81%

According to the 2022 Census of Bangladesh, Chuadanga District had 326,714 households and a population of 1,234,054 with an average of 3.75 people per household. Among the population, 198,693 (16.10%) inhabitants were under 10 years of age. The population density was 1051 people per km^{2}. Chuadanga District had a literacy rate (age 7 and over) of 71.20%, compared to the national average of 74.80%, and a sex ratio of 1031 females per 1000 males. Approximately, 24.37% of the population lived in urban areas. The ethnic population was 707.

Religions in Chuadanga District (2022)
Religion	Percent
Islam	97.61%
Hinduism	2.25%
Christianity	0.14%

Religion in present-day Chuadanga District
Religion	1941 (Note: 1941 figures correspond to Chuadanga subdivision of estwhile Nadia district excluding Krishnaganj thana (which went to India). District and thana borders have shifted slightly since 1941.)		1981		1991		2001		2011		2022	
Religion	Pop.	%	Pop.	%	Pop.	%	Pop.	%	Pop.	%	Pop.	%
Islam	156,599	63.55%	626,376	95.76%	780,741	96.73%	979,612	97.27%	1,100,330	97.46%	1,204,617	97.61%
Hinduism	86,734	35.20%	25,511	3.90%	23,878	2.96%	25,500	2.53%	26,514	2.35%	27,804	2.25%
Tribal religion	2,009	0.82%	—N/a	—N/a	—N/a	—N/a	—N/a	—N/a	—N/a	—N/a	—N/a	—N/a
Christianity	989	0.40%	1,649	0.25%	1,752	0.22%	1,701	0.17%	1,593	0.14%	1605	0.13%
Others (Note: Including Jainism, Christianity, Buddhism, Zoroastrianism, Judaism, Ad-Dharmis, or not stated)	77	0.03%	599	0.09%	793	0.09%	317	0.03%	578	0.05%	28	~0%
Total Population	246,408	100%	654,135	100%	807,164	100%	1,007,130	100%	1,129,015	100%	1,234,054	100%

In 2011, Muslims formed 97.46% of the population, Hindus 2.35%, and others 0.19%. There is a small population of 1,600 Christians, mainly in Damurhuda Upazila. Many people from Nadia of India, Munshiganj and Chandpur, Bangladesh, Comilla settled in Chuadanga after 1947.

The population of the district was 987,382 during the 2001 national survey with 50.82% male and female 49.18% compositions.

== Economy ==
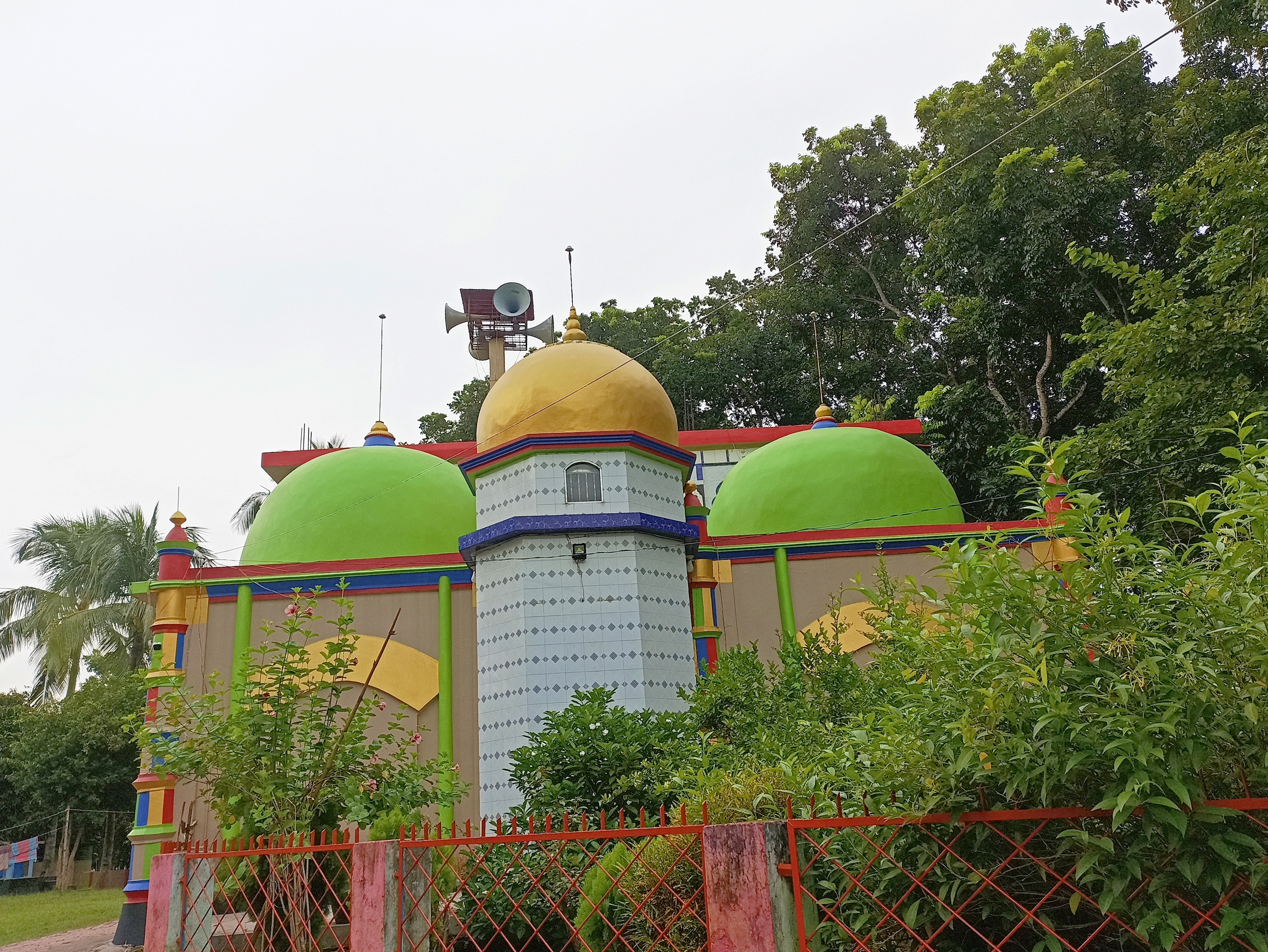
Thakurpur Pirganj Jame Mosque

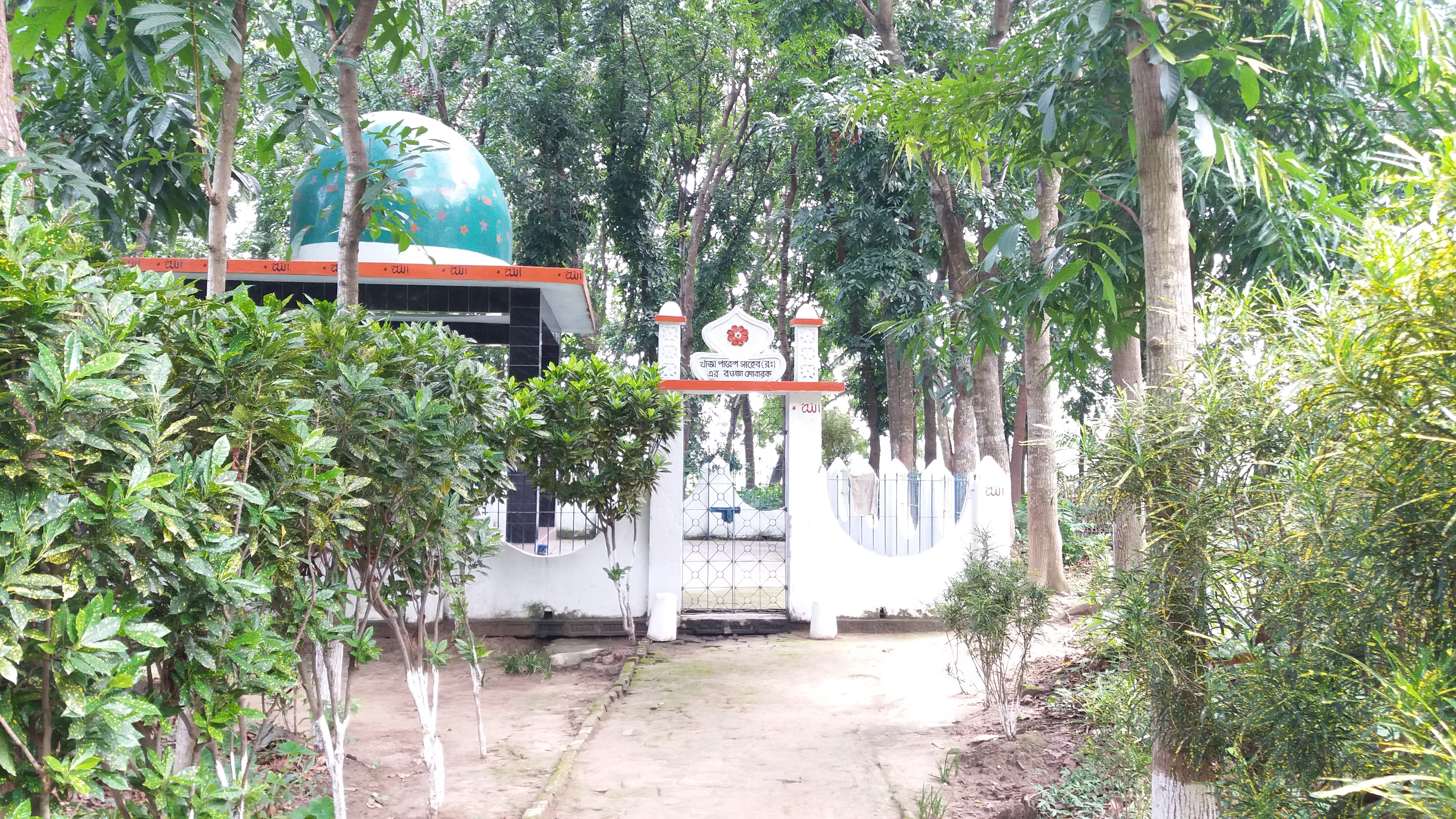
Dargah of Khwajah Paresh in Jibannagar

Most of this small district is dedicated to agriculture. Occupational distributions clearly show this, with agriculture employing 68% of the labour force, while only 12% are involved in commerce. Total cultivable land amounts to 894.20 km^{2}, of which 57% is under some sort of irrigation. Cotton is a cash crop grown in the district, and in 2013, cotton was cultivated in 4,149 hectares.

Besides agriculture, the district is now experiencing industrial growth. Major industries include Zaman Group of Industries, Bangas bread and biscuit, Tallu Spinning Mills Ltd, Khatun Plastic Limited, and Carew & Company Bangladesh Limited. Carew & Co (Bangladesh) Ltd (1933), which is situated at Darshana of Damurhuda Upazila of Chuadanga district. Sugar cane is cultivated in Darshana. Carew & Company has a distillery also which is the lone spirit producing plant of Bangladesh, Carew & Company Bangladesh Limited is an enterprise of Bangladesh Sugar & Food Industries Corporation (BSFIC). BSFIC is an autonomous body of Ministry of Industries.

== Transportation ==
Chuadanga is connected to four of its neighbouring districts (Kushtia, Jessore, Jhenidah and Meherpur) through inter-district highways and connected to Jessore, Jhenaidah and Kushtia by railway. The district is connected to the rest of the country by five highways and a railway. There are 203 km of finished road, 211 km of herring-bone and 132 km of mud road. A total length of railway tracks of just over 50 km connects the three railway stations inside the district with the country's railway network. By 2013, five out of the ten stations in the district were shut down due to a lack of manpower.

== Notable people ==
- Solaiman Haque Joarder, Former Awami League MP
- Ashab-ul-Haq, Politician, Physician and Organiser of the Liberation War, who was a member of the then East Pakistan Provincial Council and a member of parliament from the then Kushtia-7 constituency.
- Shamsuzzaman Dudu, Former Bangladesh Nationalist Party MP and the vice-chairman of the Bangladesh Nationalist Party.
- Mia Mohammad Mansur Ali, Former Bangladesh Nationalist Party politician and member of parliament for Kushtia-7 and Chuadanga-1.
- Md. Ali Azgar, Bangladesh Awami League politician and a former member of Jatiya Sangsad representing the Chuadanga-2 constituency.
- Akram Ahmed (Bir Uttam) - Titled Bir Uttam.
- Harunur Rashid (Bir Pratik) - A martyred hero who received the title of Bir Pratik.
- Khoda Box Sai - ( Lyricist ) Musician and Singer - Ekushey Padak recipient in 1991.
- Surendramohan Bhattacharya - Renowned writer, author of Purohit Darpan.
- Anantahari Mitra (1906 – 28 September 1926) - One of the leading figures of the anti-British independence movement of the Indian subcontinent and a martyred revolutionary of the Age of Fire.
- Baby Islam - Renowned photographer, cinematographer and film director ( won the National Film Award for Best Cinematographer three times).
- Shafiq Tuhin - A popular lyricist, composer and music artist of Bangladesh. He won the National Film Award for Best Lyricist in 2011.
- Kazi Rakibuddin Ahmed - Bangladeshi retired civil servant and former Chief Election Commissioner of Bangladesh. Former Chief Election Commissioner of Bangladesh.
- Firoza Bari Malik, a renowned women leader and social worker.
- Tina Khan, actress and producer.
- Nazneen Hasan Chumki, actress and director.
- Shafiqul Islam, Former Commissioner of Dhaka Metropolitan Police.
- Abu Saeed Muhammad Omar Ali is a Bangladeshi Islamic scholar, writer, translator, editor, organiser and cultural figure.
- Habibur Rahman, Islamic speaker and former MP.
- Saju Ahammed, Kathak dancer and Shilpakala Padak recipient.
- Mamun Joarder, retired Bangladeshi national team Footballer. Member of the Bangladesh National team that won its first international trophy.

== See also ==
- Districts of Bangladesh
- Divisions of Bangladesh
- Upazilas of Bangladesh
- Administrative geography of Bangladesh
