= Kalupole Rajar Vita =

Archaeological Site in Bangladesh

- Coordinates: 23°33′30.29″N 88°54′55.05″E
- Built: 15th century
- Owner: Government of the People's Republic of Bangladesh

Kalupole Rajar Vita is an archeological mound or archaeological site. It is situated on 1.08 acres of land in Kalupole village of Titudah Union of Sadar Upazila of Chuadanga District. The place was the palace or Vita of a king named Raja Gandharva Raya. It is popularly known as Rajar Vita among locals.

== History of discovery and excavation ==
In 2015–16, archaeological survey and research activities were conducted in the Chuadanga District in the Khulna Division of Bangladesh. During this time, an ancient mound named Rajar Vita was discovered near the village Kalupole. Early excavations found archaeological remains under the mound; the remains bore resemblance to structures of the Sultanate period. During the survey, a few square red burnt tile bricks similar to those used in the architectural construction of Khan Jahan Ali were found at the top of the mound. From the measurements of the bricks and the analysis of the construction materials, it is believed that there are several archaeological remains located at the foot of the mound. These are suspected to be dated similarly to Khan Jahan Ali, i.e. to the Sultanate period.

Considering its archaeological importance, a decision was taken to conduct archaeological excavation of this site located on the banks of Chitra River and an excavation team comprising twelve employees of the Khulna divisional office of the Directorate of Archaeology was formed. The team conducted an initial excavation in April 2017 at Kalupole King's residence in Chuadanga. Several important objects, including the ruins of these historically important architectural structures, have been found in this excavation. Later excavations were conducted in 2017–18 and in 2018–19. In these excavations, architectural sites from two distinct periods of construction were discovered. These artefacts and architectures have similarities with the artefacts of Khalifatabad and Muhammadabad.

== Archaeological finds ==
Several important artefacts have been found at Kalupole Rajar Vita. The artefacts found include terracotta bricks decorated with flower vines, semi-precious stone beads, iron objects, terracotta balls, broken parts of terracotta bangles, terracotta toys, terracotta beads, and deer horns, among others. Various types of pottery have also been discovered. These include red colored vessel tubes, blue glazed ware, red colored oil lamps, ordinary pots, drinking vessels, plates, bowls, bone pots, lids, pitchers etc. Several archaeological remains have also been found. These may be archeological remains of the pre-Muslim era.

== Management ==
It is managed by the Directorate of Archeology as it is a listed archaeological site of Bangladesh Directorate of Archaeology.
