= Chuadanga Sadar Upazila =

Chuadanga Sadar চুয়াডাঙ্গা সদর
- Upazila
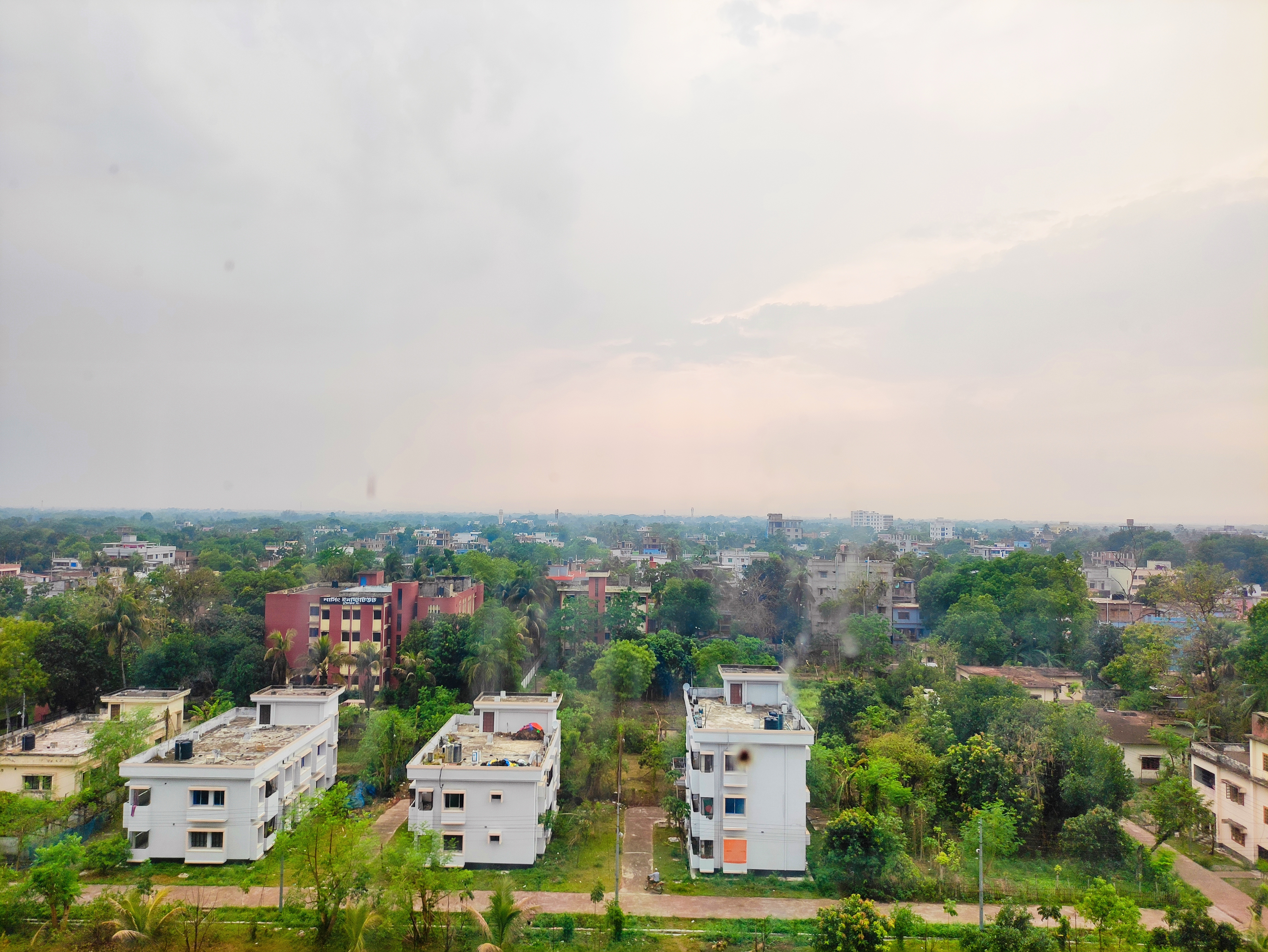
- Skyline of Chuadanga

- Coordinates: 23°38.5′N 88°51.5′E
- Country: Bangladesh
- Division: Khulna
- District: Chuadanga
- Headquarters: Chuadanga

Area
  - Total: 298.27 km^{2} (115.16 sq mi)

Population (2022)
  - Total: 350,528
  - Density: 1,175.2/km^{2} (3,043.8/sq mi)
- Time zone: UTC+6 (BST)
- Postal code: 7200
- Area code: 0761
- Website: chuadangasadar.chuadanga.gov.bd

Chuadanga Sadar Upazila mauza geocode map

Chuadanga Sadar (Bengali: চুয়াডাঙ্গা সদর) is an upazila of Chuadanga District in Khulna, Bangladesh. It was designated as the provisional capital of Bangladesh during the Independence War in 1971.

== Geography ==
Chuadanga Sadar is located at 23.6417°N 88.8583°E. It has 77,144 households and an area of 298.27 km2. Chuadanga Sadar Upazila is part of the Chuadanga district of the Khulna division. This upazila, with an area of 299 square kilometres, is bordered by Alamdanga Upazila to the north, Jibannagar Upazila to the south, Jhenaidah Sadar Upazila, Kotchandpur Upazila and Harinakundu Upazila of Jhenaidah district to the east, and Damurhuda Upazila and West Bengal, India to the west.

== Background ==
Until 1947, Chuadanga Sadar Upazila was a Thana of Chuadanga Subdistrict in Nadia District. After the Partition of India in 1947, it was included in the greater Kushtia District as a Thana of Chuadanga Subdistrict. On 26 February 1984, Chuadanga Subdistrict was converted into a district and in 1982, Chuadanga Sadar Thana was converted into a designated Thana, which is currently known as Chuadanga Sadar Upazila. On 1 February 1984, the designated Chuadanga Thana was upgraded to an Upazila through a proclamation. Among the information available about the name "Chuadanga", the most common and reliable idea is that a trader named Chungo Mallik first settled on the eastern bank of the Mathabhanga River. The name Chuadanga is probably derived from Chungodanga due to the pronunciation distortion or corruption during the translation of the Persian part of his name from Chungo to English. When Mushird Quli Khan divided Bengal into 93 chaklas, Chuadanga was included in the Jessore chakla. According to the records of 1855, Chuadanga, with an area of 289.20 square kilometres, was included in 6 parganas. These were Fatejangpur, Shahujial, Rajpur, Mahmudshahi, Ughra and Matiari. Many people believe that the word Meteri may be a corruption of the word Matiari. When the subdivision was established in 1859, its headquarters were established at Damurhuda. In 1869, the subdivision headquarters were shifted to Chuadanga. In 1892, this subdivision was abolished and merged with Meherpur. Later, Chuadanga subdivision was re-established on 15 March 1897. After the partition of India in 1947, Chuadanga Sadar Thana was under the Rajshahi division. After the formation of Khulna Division in 1952, Chuadanga was included in Khulna Division.

== 1971 war ==
The Bir Protik award for gallantry was awarded to Harunur Rashed of Chuadanga District. He was killed on November 27 at Jadupur, under Chuadanga Sadar Upazila. He is buried at Jadupur in the tomb on the day after the elimination of Johor. He fought in many parts of Chuadanga. Every 16 December and 26 March, Chuadanga honours its family. He has a son who was born six months after his father's death. His wife's name was Mst. Suraton Nesa. She died in 2004.

== Demographics ==
Historical population
Year	Pop.	±%
1981	181,617	—
1991	223,247	+22.9%
2001	278,726	+24.9%
2011	313,935	+12.6%
2022	350,504	+11.6%
Source: Bangladesh Bureau of Statistics

Religions in Chuadanga Sadar Upazila (2022)
Religion	Percent
Islam	97.44%
Hinduism	2.51%
Other or not stated	0.05%

According to the 2022 Bangladeshi census, Chuadanga Sadar Upazila had 92,269 households and a population of 350,528. 8.24% of the population was under 5 years of age. Chuadanga Sadar had a literacy rate (age 7 and over) of 72.48%: 73.87% for males and 71.14% for females, and a sex ratio of 97.33 males for every 100 females. 115,414 (32.93%) lived in urban areas.

== Administrative area ==
Chuadanga Sadar Upazila was established in 1984.

Chuadanga Sadar Upazila is divided into Chuadanga Municipality, with a total area of 38 square kilometres.Chaudanga municipality was formed in 1960. However, it began functioning in 1965. The municipality is subdivided into 9 wards and 41 mahallas.

There are nine union parishads: Alukdia, Begumpur, Kutubpur, Mominpur, Padmabila, Shankar Chandra, Titudah, Garaitupi, and Nehalpur Union. There are 101 mouzas, and 170 villages in Chuadanga Sadar Upazila.

== Education ==
According to Banglapedia, Chuadanga Sadar Upazila has 4 colleges, 27 secondary schools, 1 technical school 1, and 8 madrasas. The notable educational institutes include:

- Victoria Jubilee Government High School
- Chuadanga Adarsha High School
- Adarsha Girls High School
- Collectorate school and college, Chuadanga
- Chuadanga Government Girls High School
- Chuadanga Academy School
- Chuadanga Police Line School
- Rail Bazar Govt. Primary School
- 105 No Matiar Rahman Malik Government Primary School
- Jhinuk High School
- Taltola Government Primary School
- Bujruk Gorgori Government Primary School
- Chuadanga Technical School and College
- Chuadanga Government College
- Chuadanga Pouro Degree College
- Chuadanga Adarsha Mohila College
- Badarganj Degree College
- Boro Salua New Model College
- Tatul Sheikh College
- Badarganj Alia Madrasa
- Chuadanga Fazil Madrasa
- Chuadanga Mohila Dakhil Madrasa

== Transport ==
Chuadanga is well connected with the capital city, Dhaka, by Road & Train and also with another major city of the country. CD Explorer, Royal Express, Purbasha Paribahan, JR Paribahan, Darshana Deluxe, GoldenLine and Sonartori, etc. are the main bus operators. Buses use basically two routes for travelling to Dhaka by road. One is via Jhenaidah-Magura-Faridpur-Rajbari, then the ferry service over the Padma River at Doulotdia Ghat to Paturia ghat, then Manikaganj-Dhaka Gabtoli bus stand, and the other route is Jhenaidah-Magura-Faridpur-Mawa-Padma Bridge-Munshiganj-Dhaka. There are 3 Inter-city Trains and One Commuter train(Nakshikatha Commuter) that run to connect to the capital city. The Benapole Express and Sundarban Express are using the Padma Bridge, also the commuter train, and the Chitra Express is using the Jamuna Railway Bridge to reach Dhaka Kamlapur station.

== Notable people ==
- Solaiman Haque Joarder, Former Awami League MP
- Ashab-ul-Haq, Politician, Physician and Organizer of the Liberation War who was a member of the then East Pakistan Provincial Council and a member of parliament from the then Kushtia-7 constituency.
- Shamsuzzaman Dudu, Former Bangladesh Nationalist Party MP and the vice-chairman of the Bangladesh Nationalist Party.

== Sightseeing ==
- Police Park
- Shishu Sargo Park
- Mathabhanga Bridge
- Chuadanga Boro Mosque
- Hazrat Malek-ul-Ghaus (RA) Shrine
- Thakurpur Jame Mosque
- Shrine of Shiel Pir
- Garaitupi Amaravati Fair

== See also ==
- Upazilas of Bangladesh
- Districts of Bangladesh
- Divisions of Bangladesh
- Administrative geography of Bangladesh
