= Satgachia Mosque =

Mosque in Jhenaidah, Bangladesh

Satgachia Gaibana Mosque
- সাতগাছিয়া গায়েবানা মসজিদ
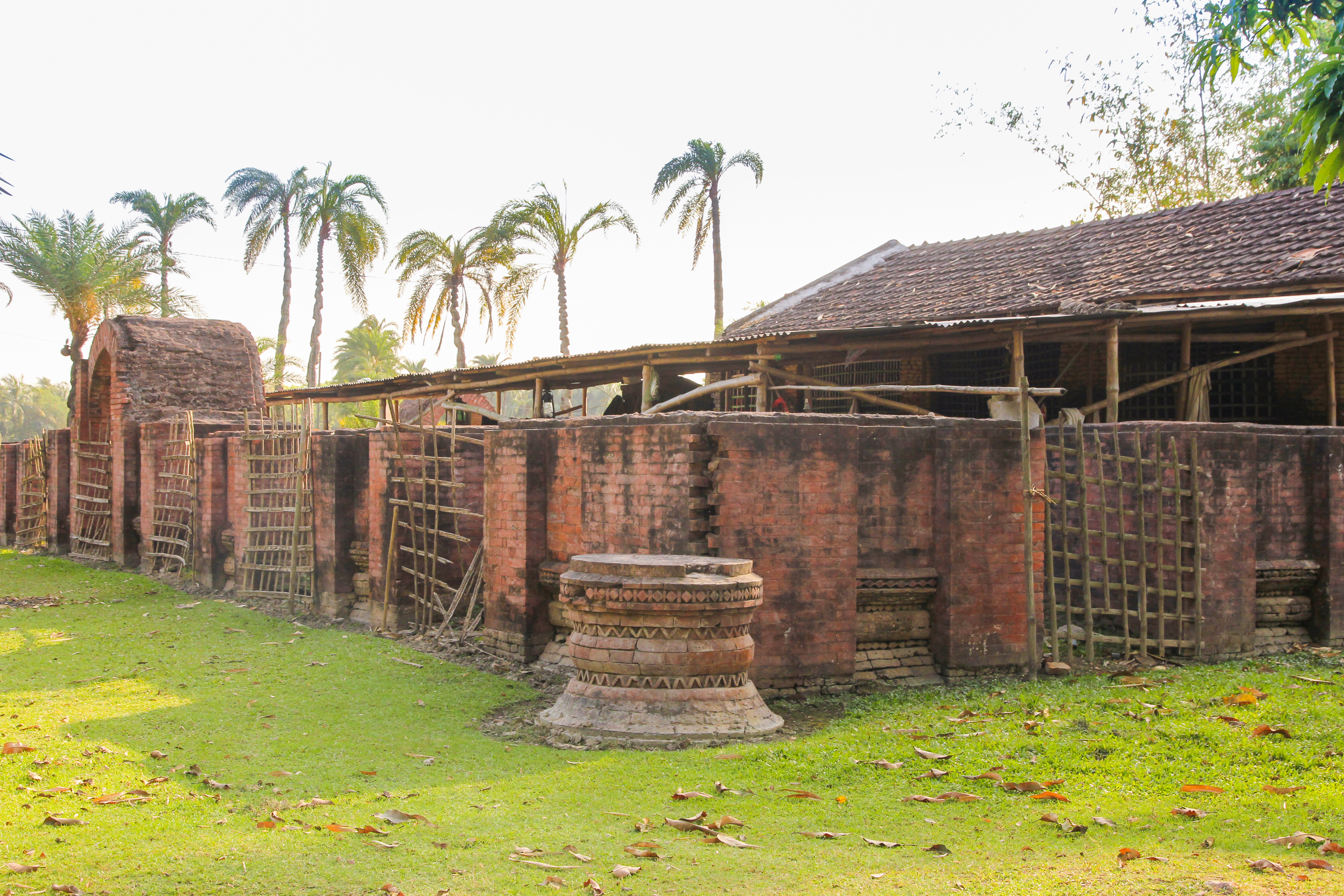

Religion
- Affiliation: Islam
- District: Jhenaidah District
- Festivals: Eid ul-Fitr, Eid ul-Adha
- Ecclesiastical or organisational status: Mosque
- Ownership: Department of Archaeology (Bangladesh)
- Status: Preserved

Location
- Location: Satgachia, Kaliganj Upazila, Jhenaidah District
- Municipality: Barobazar
- Country: Bangladesh
- Interactive map of Satgachia Gaibana Mosque
- Coordinates: 23°18′58″N 89°07′06″E

Architecture
- Type: Mosque
- Style: Tughlaq architectural style

Specifications
- Direction of façade: East
- Length: 24.25 meters
- Width: 18.55 meters
- Height (max): 1.85 meters
- Dome: 35

Satgachia Gaibana Mosque is an ancient mosque and archaeological site located in Jhenaidah District, Bangladesh. It is situated in the historic mosque city of Mohammadabad at Baro Bazar Union in Satgachia village of Kaliganj Upazila.

== History ==
In 1983, local residents excavated part of a large mound. The excavation revealed a mosque with 16 pillars and terracotta decorations, including five mihrabs. Later, in 1990, the Department of Archaeology (Bangladesh) excavated the remains of a mosque with 35 domes. The mosque is similar in style to the Sixty Dome Mosque built by Khan Jahan Ali and features Tughlaq architecture. Archaeologists believe that in the 15th century, Khan Jahan Ali came to propagate Islam in Bengal with his followers. During this period, one of his disciples built this mosque, which later became buried under earth.

== Structure ==
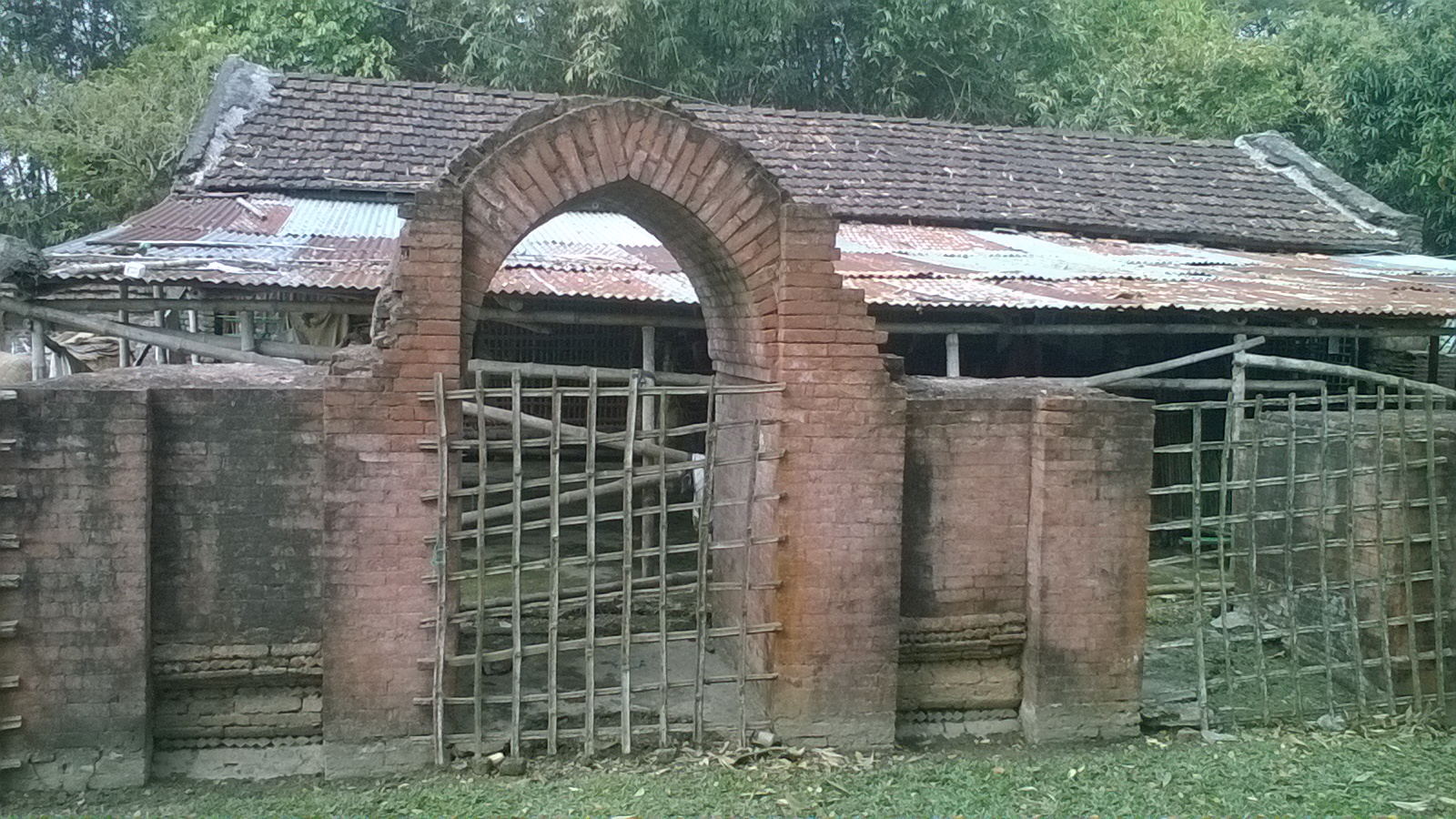
Satgachia 35-Dome Adina Mosque

The Satgachia Gaibana Adina Mosque is rectangular, measuring 24.25 meters north–south and 18.55 meters east–west. The walls are 1.60 meters thick and have been excavated to a height of 1.85 meters from the ground. There are 3 doors on the north, 5 on the south, 7 on the east, and 1 on the west. The western door has been closed by locals. Because the east has the maximum number of 7 doors, it is considered the mosque's front. The doors are 1.30 meters wide with narrow arches above. The arches are damaged. Between two doors, vertical grooves are carved into the walls from the floor. The grooves are 0.65 meters wide and 0.13 meters deep. Above these grooves are rows of boteh designs. On the qibla wall on the west side, there are six decorated mihrabs. The mihrabs include motifs of flowers, buds, leaves, trees, bells, and chains. Above the central mihrab is a sealed door. The floor is divided into three platforms, with a pitano concrete platform attached to the south side of the qibla wall. Inside the mosque, there are 48 pillars.

== Gallery ==
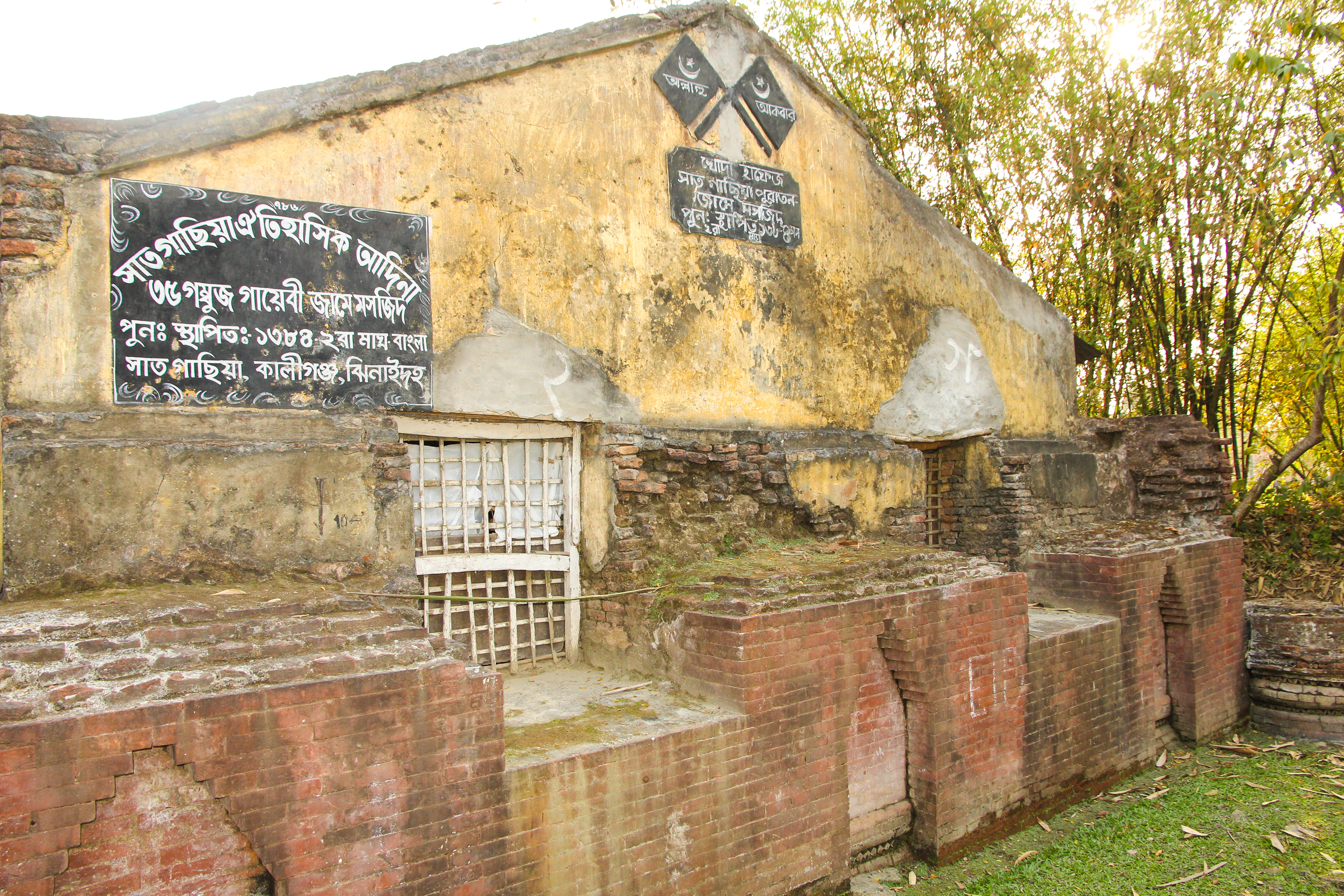
Satgachia Gaibana Mosque 1

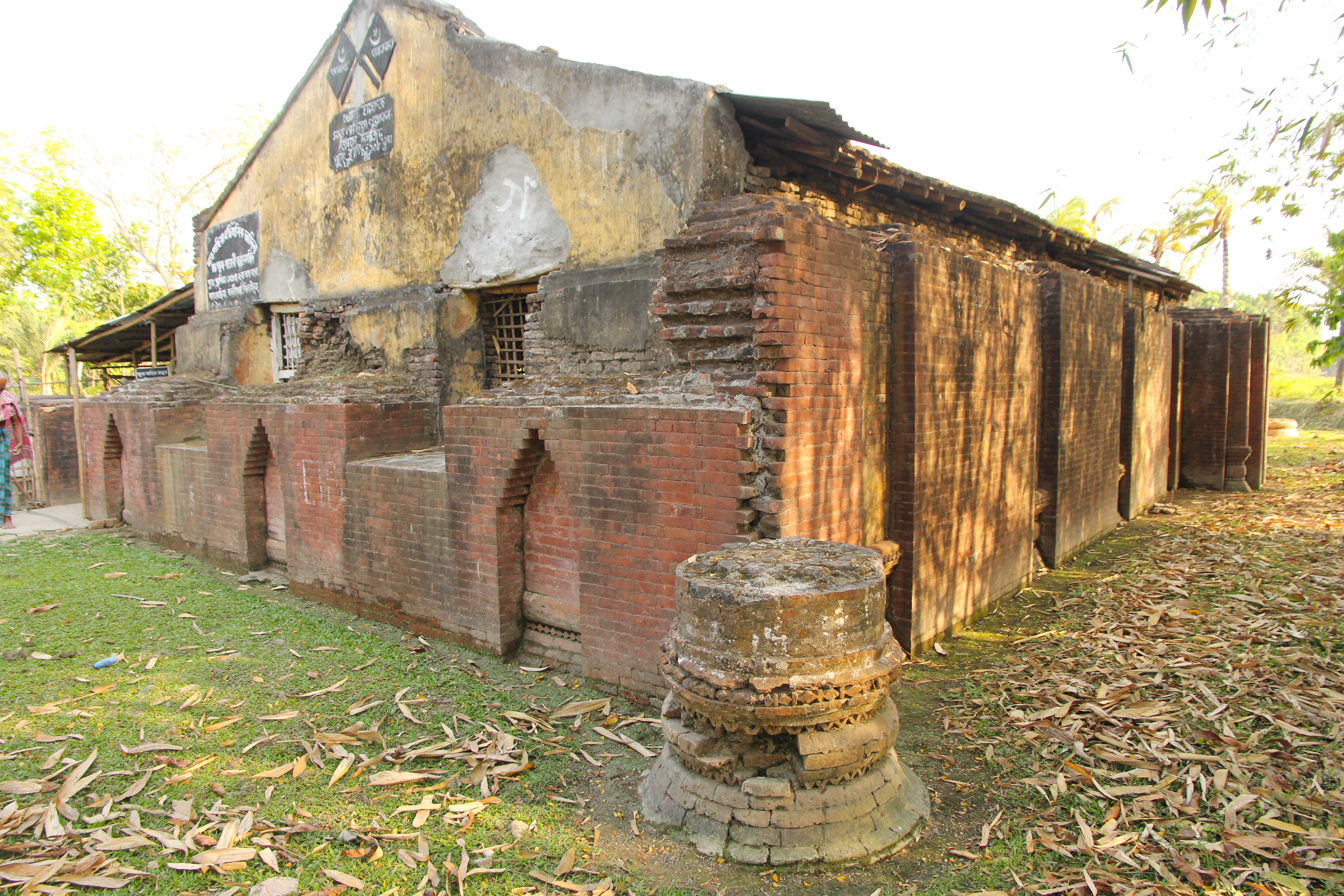
Satgachia Gaibana Mosque 2

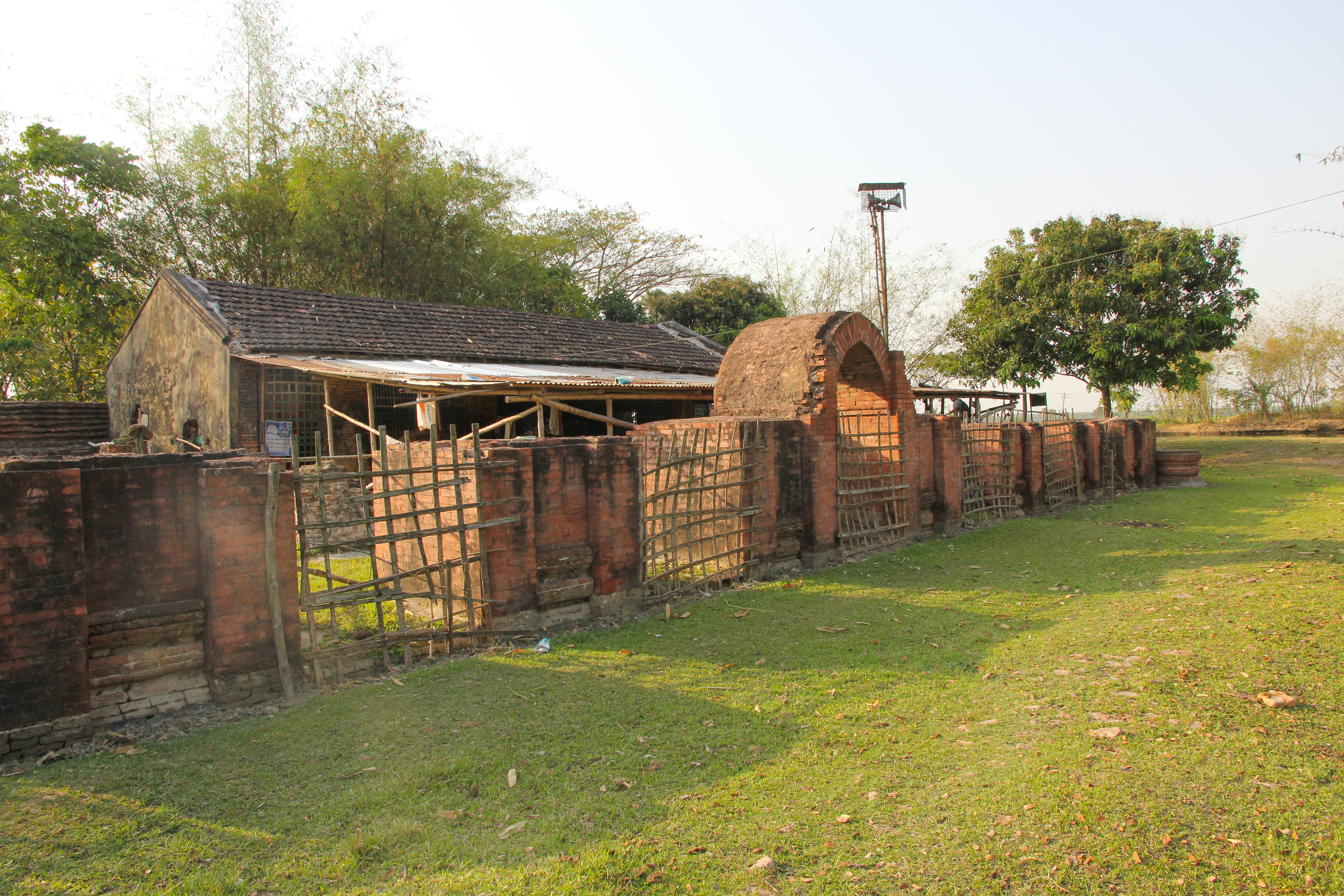
Satgachia Gaibana Mosque 3

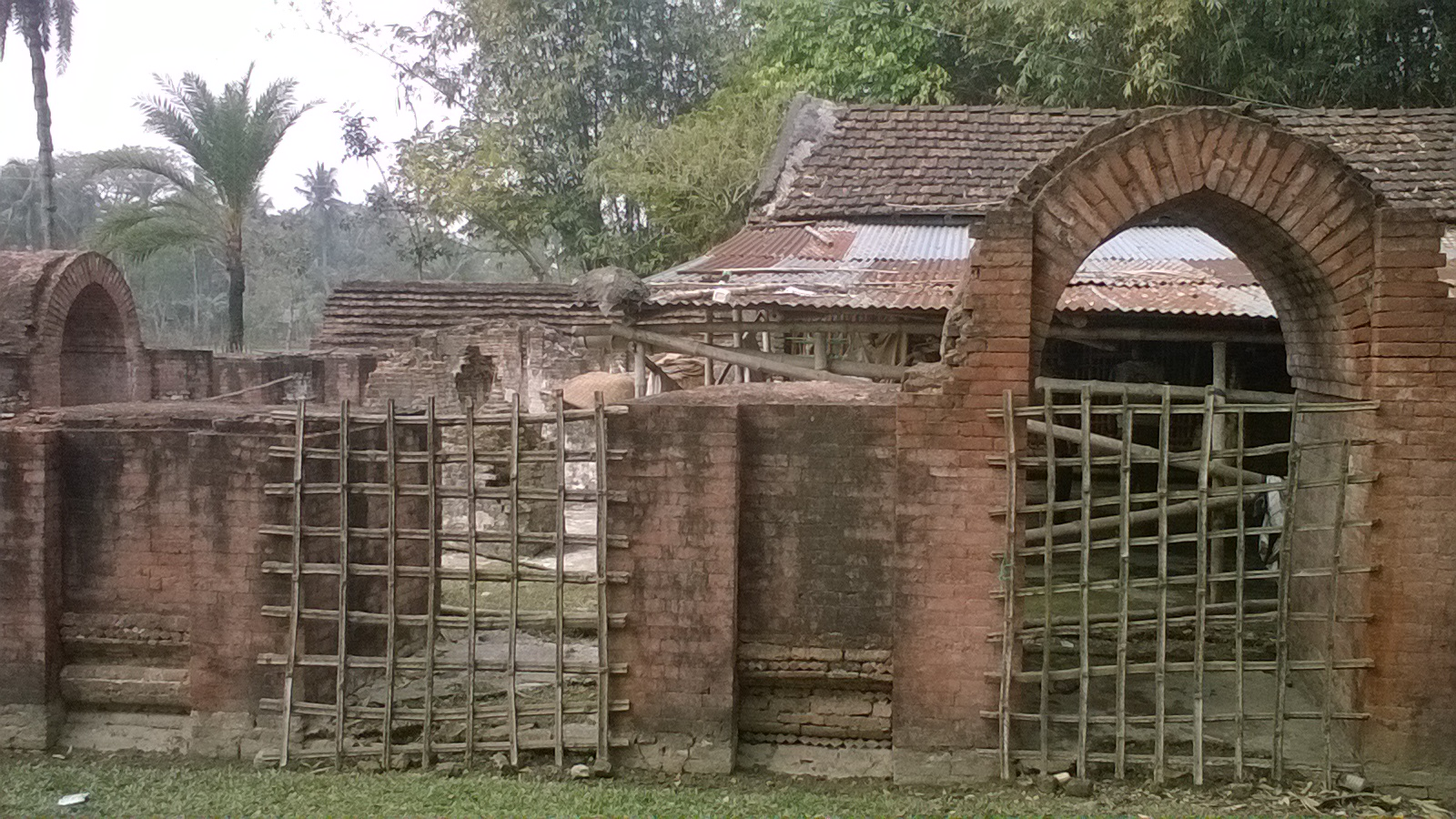
Satgachia 35-Dome Adina Mosque 2

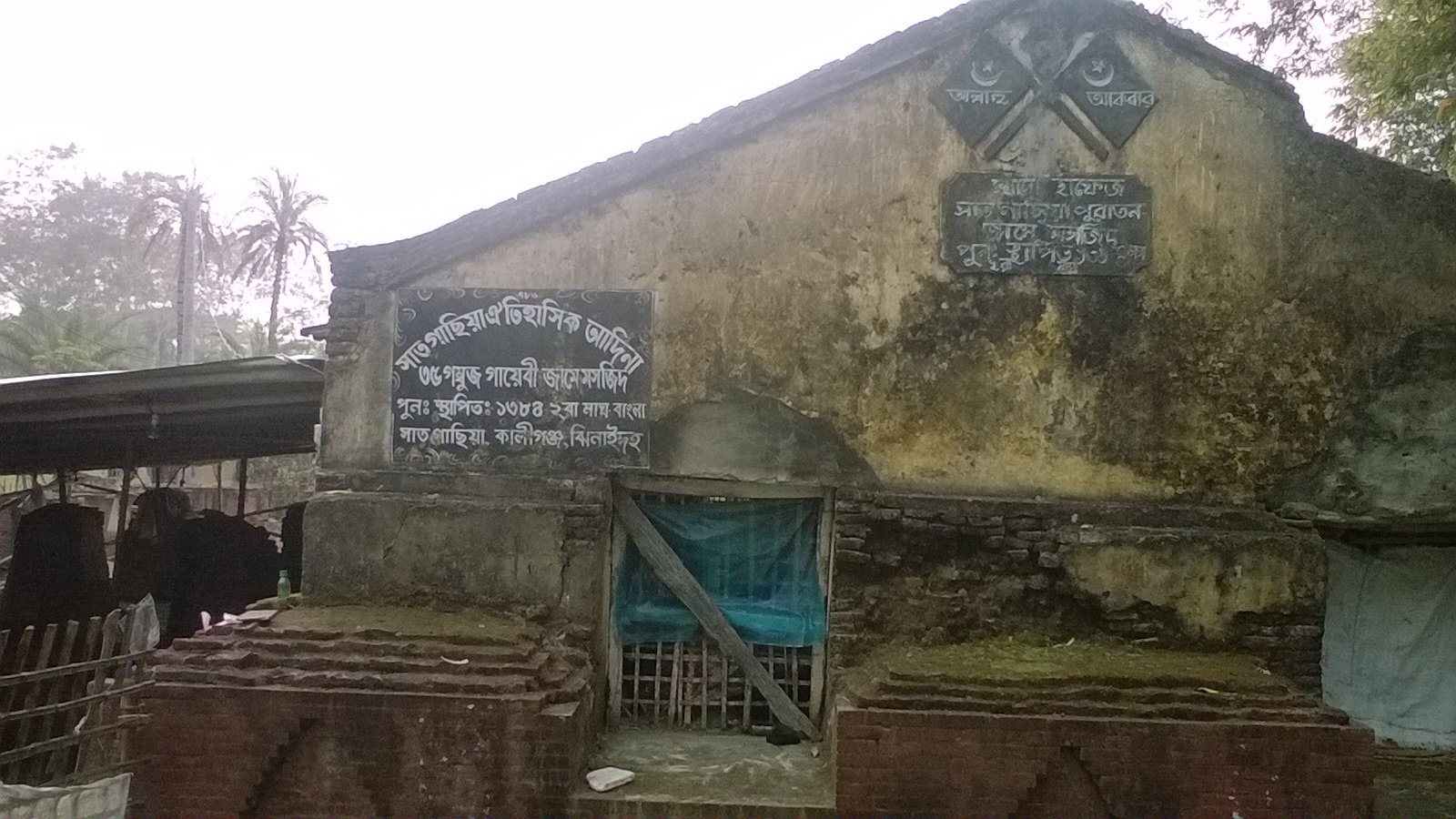
Satgachia 35-Dome Adina Mosque 3

== See also ==
- List of mosques in Bangladesh
