= Gorar Mosque =

Mosque in Jhenaidah, Bangladesh

- গোরার মসজিদ
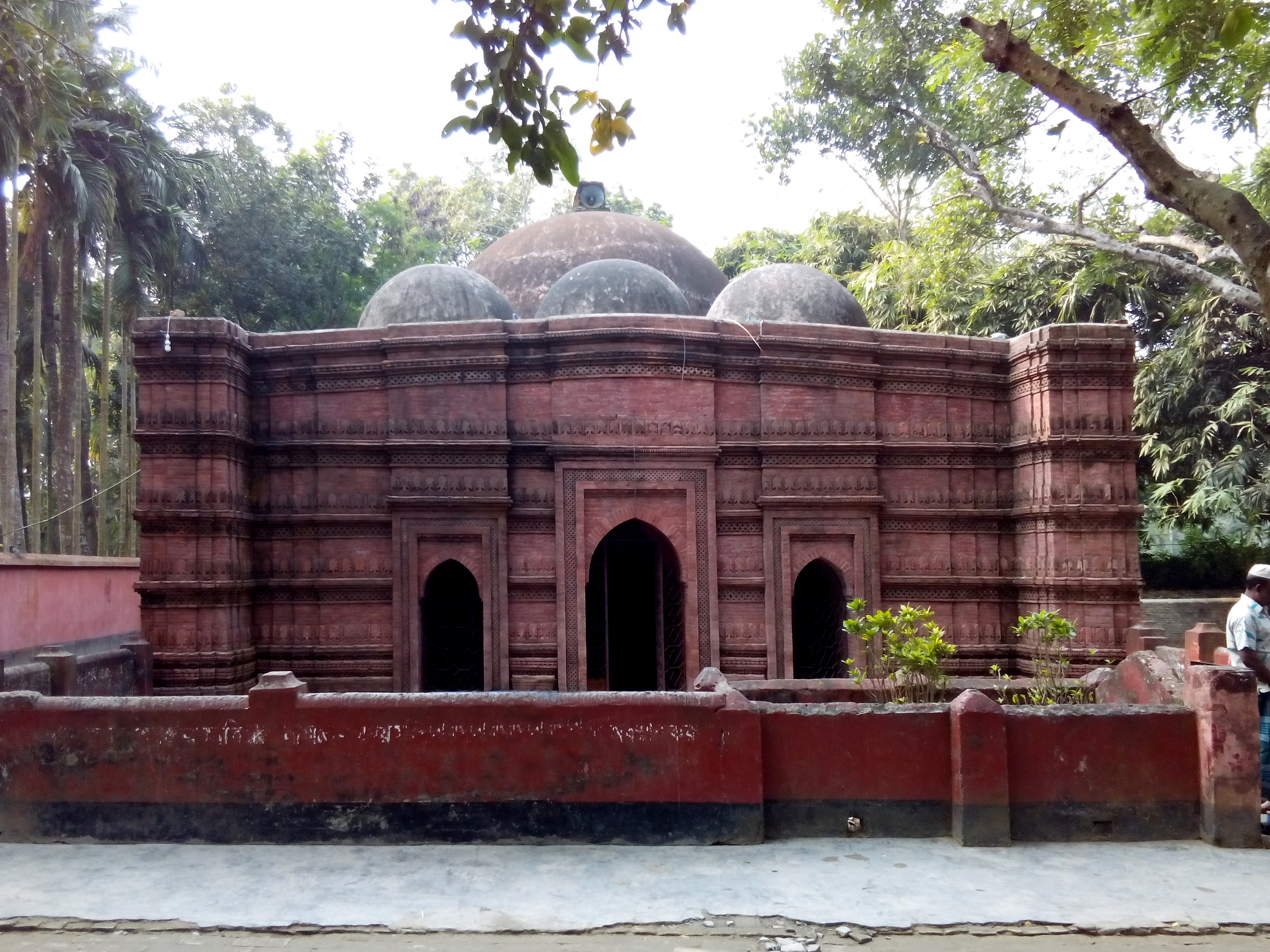

- Location within Bangladesh

Religion
- Affiliation: Islam
- Status: Active

Location
- Location: Kaliganj Upazila, Jhenaidah District, Bangladesh
- Administration: Department of Archeology
- Coordinates: 23.303145°N 89.142077°E

Architecture
- Type: Mosque architecture
- Style: Bengal Sultanate
- Established: 15th century/16th century

Specifications
- Interior area: 6.15 m²
- Dome: 1
- Materials: Brick

Gorar Mosque (Bengali: গোরার মসজিদ) is a well-preserved medieval Bengal Sultanate-era mosque located in Barobazar village, Kaliganj Upazila, Jhenidah District, Bangladesh. Situated approximately one kilometer west of the Jessore–Jhenidah highway, it stands as one of the best-conserved monuments at the Mosque city of Mohammadabad and protected by the Department of Archaeology.

== History ==
Barobazar, located in Jhenidah district, is believed to derive its name from twelve (baro) Muslim saints who settled there before the arrival of Khan Jahan Ali. The architecture of its monuments shows closer resemblance to the Ilyas Shahi style than to the later Khan Jahan style seen in nearby Bagerhat. Lacking inscriptions, the structures are dated stylistically to the Ilyas Shahi period either late 14th or early 15th century C.E. based on common mosque attributes. Perween Hasan suggests the mosque can be dated to the early 16th century due to stylistic similarities with the Bagha Mosque which was built by Sultan Nusrat Shah of the Hussain Shahi dynasty in 1523 and Majlis Awlia's Mosque at Faridpur. There is a large pond in front of the mosque. The mosque was originally in ruins. The name literally means "first mosque" or "oldest mosque". According to historians and local folklore, Sufi saint Gorai Shah, a disciple of Khan Jahan Ali, arrived in the Barobazar area of Jhenidah during the Sultanate period under Sultan Alauddin Husain Shah. It is said that he constructed the single-domed mosque in nearby Belat Daulatpur village, which was later named Gorar Mosque after him. An ancient grave next to the mosque is believed to be that of Sufi Gorai Shah himself. In 1983 the Department of Archaeology now Directorate of Archaeology, began excavations in Barobazar, uncovering Gorar Mosque and several nearby mosques. The structure was completely rebuilt and restored, making it one of the best-preserved monuments at Barobazar. It is now a protected site.

== Architecture ==
The mosque has a square prayer chamber with three entrances on the east—the central doorway 1.24 metres (4.1 ft) wide and the flanking doorways 81 cm each—and one entrance each on the north and south walls, 1.32 metres (4.3 ft) wide. The front verandah mirrors this arrangement, featuring three eastern openings and one opening each on the north and south sides. Six engaged octagonal towers accent the building: four at the corners of the prayer chamber and two at the points where the verandah joins the main hall. The main prayer hall is square, measuring 6.01 metres (19.7 ft) internally on each side. The front verandah is 2.08 metres (6.8 ft) wide internally, with 1.45 metres (4.8 ft) thick walls. The verandah has three pointed-arch entrances on the east and one on each north and south side. Three arched openings lead from the verandah into the prayer chamber, while the north and south walls of the prayer hall each contain one arched opening. All external entrances feature projected shallow panels, producing vertical offsets typical of early Ilyas Shahi architecture in Gaur and Hazrat Pandua. The qibla wall has three mihrab niches aligned with the eastern entrances, adorned with abstract geometrical terracotta ornamentation.

=== Decoration ===
The three semi-circular mihrabs has half-domes, cusped pointed arches, and spandrel rosettes sit in rectangular panels topped by merlons. The central mihrab has stemmed leaf motifs, a lively lotus vine frame, and hanging motifs on chains in rectangular panels. Merlons ring the dome base; dome arches bear four-petalled flower bands. Thin lime plaster remnants remain on the exterior west/north sides and parts of the wall base.

== Gallery ==
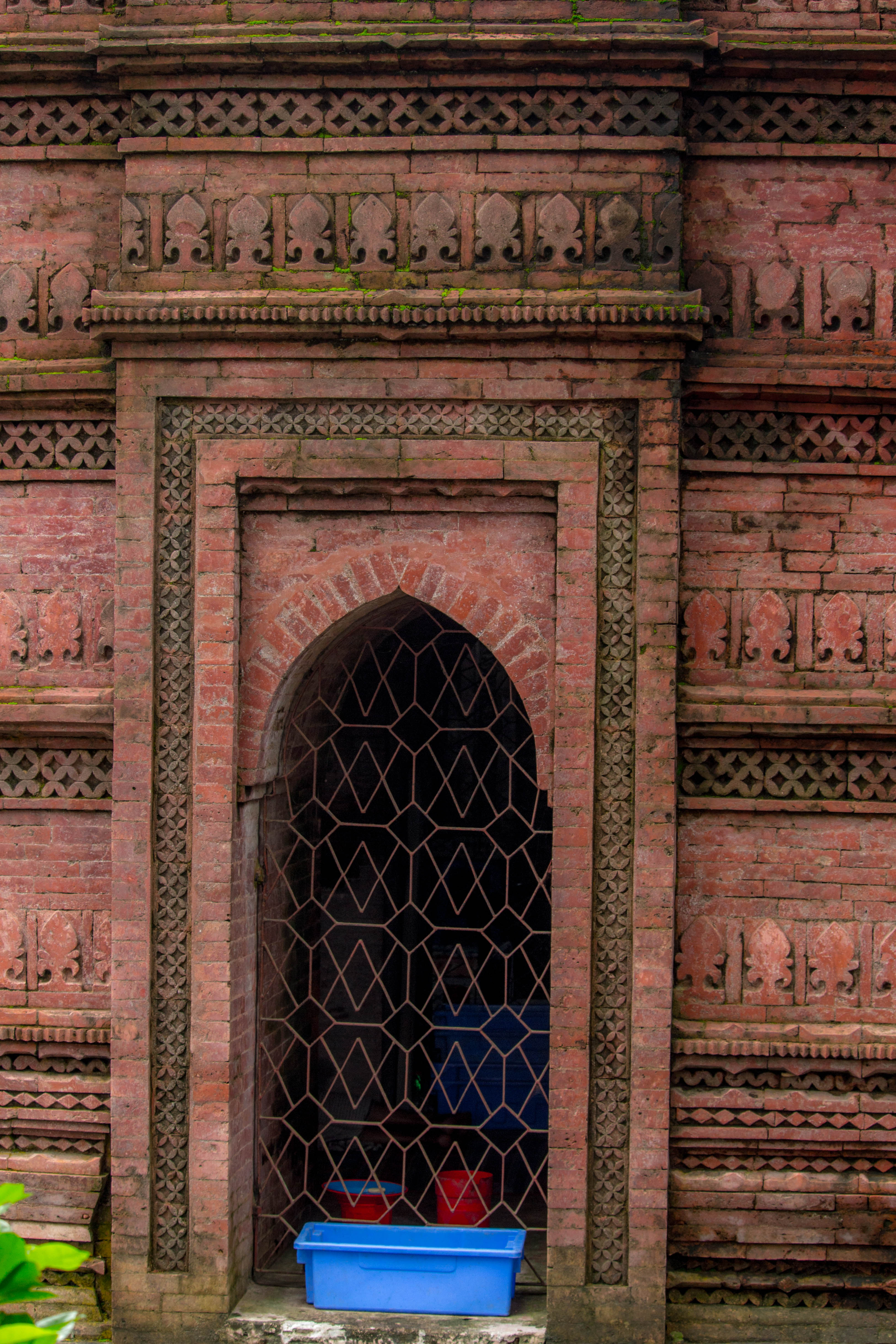
Mosque entrance

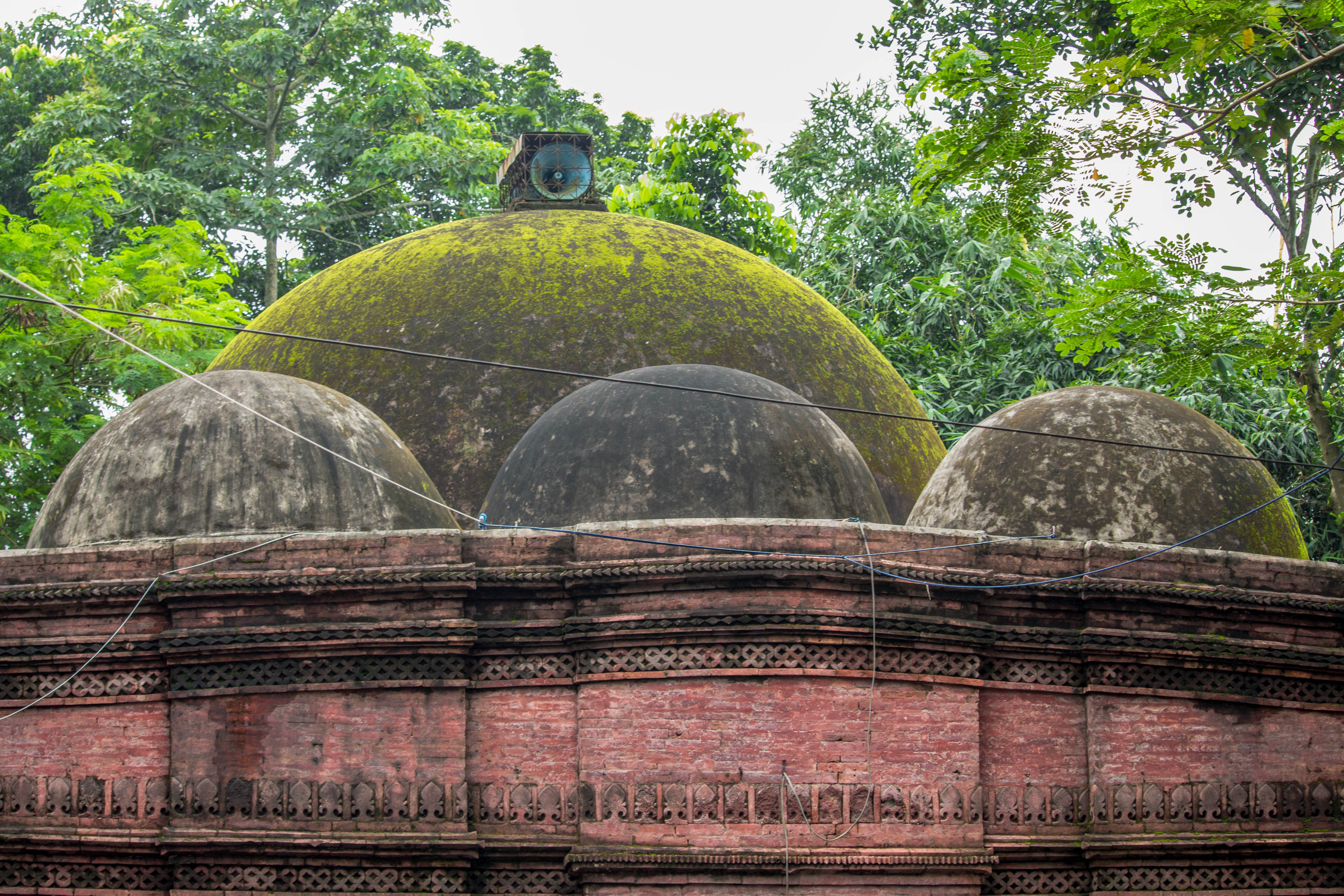
Domes of the Mosque

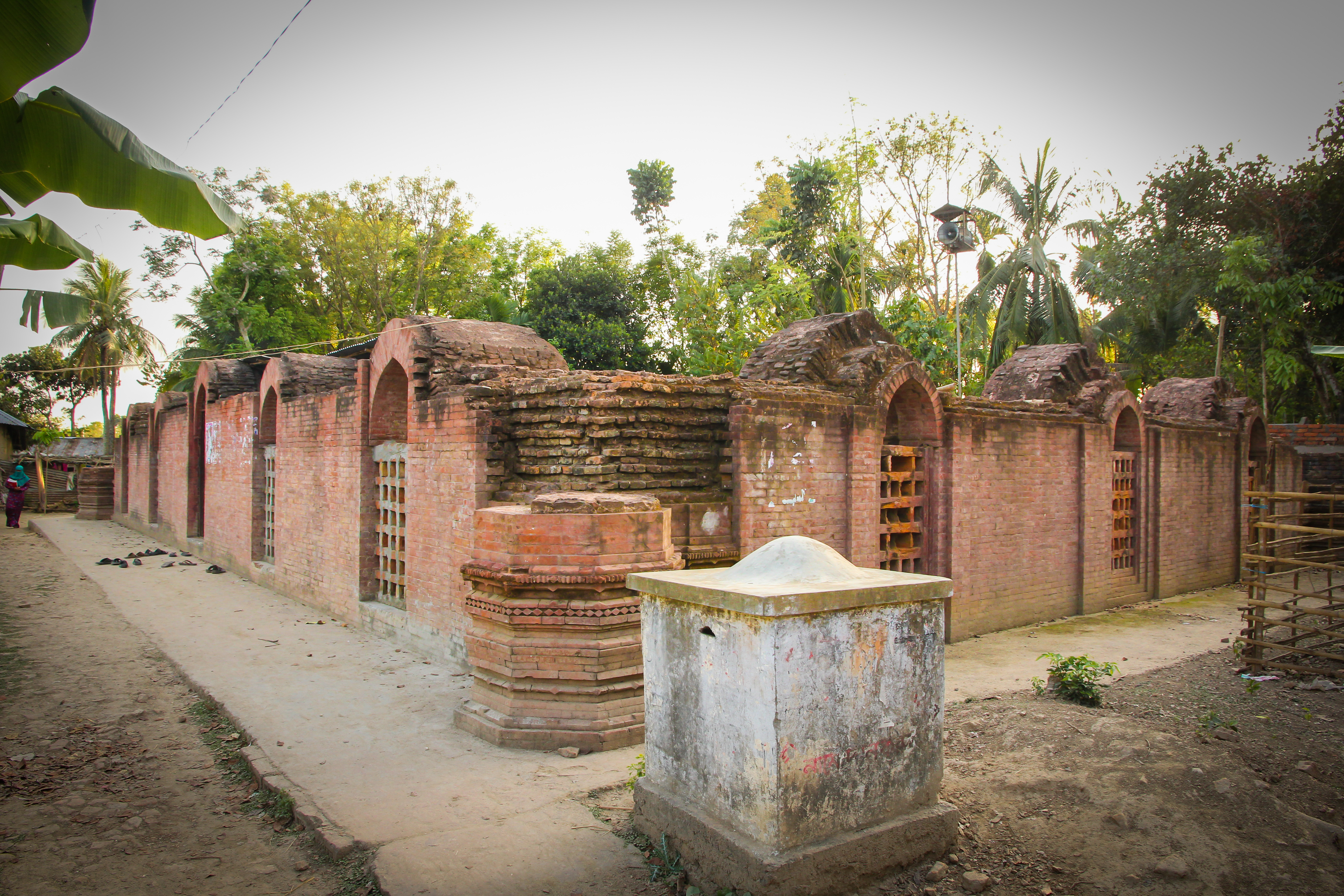
The mosque in ruins before reconstruction

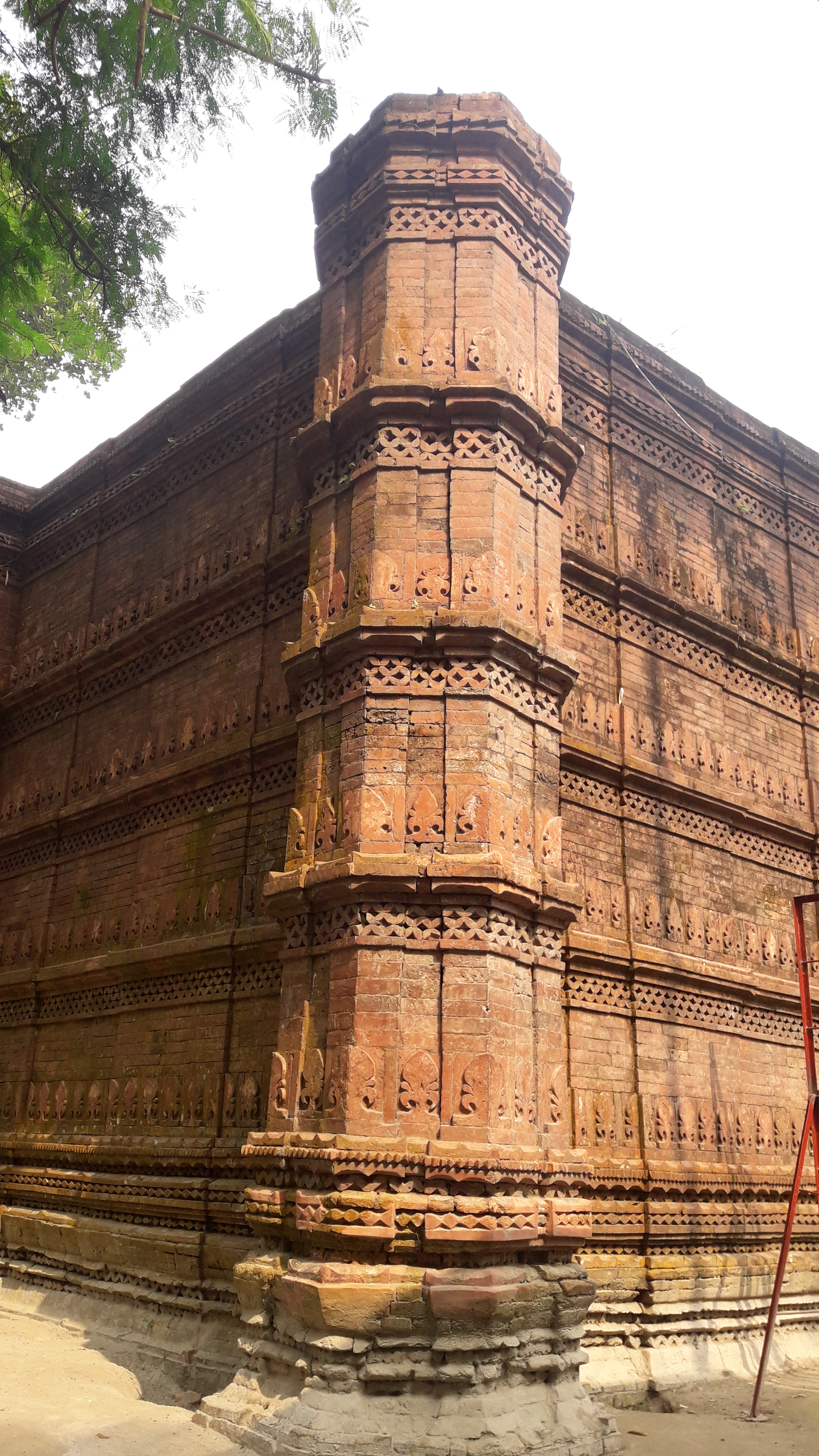
Side towers

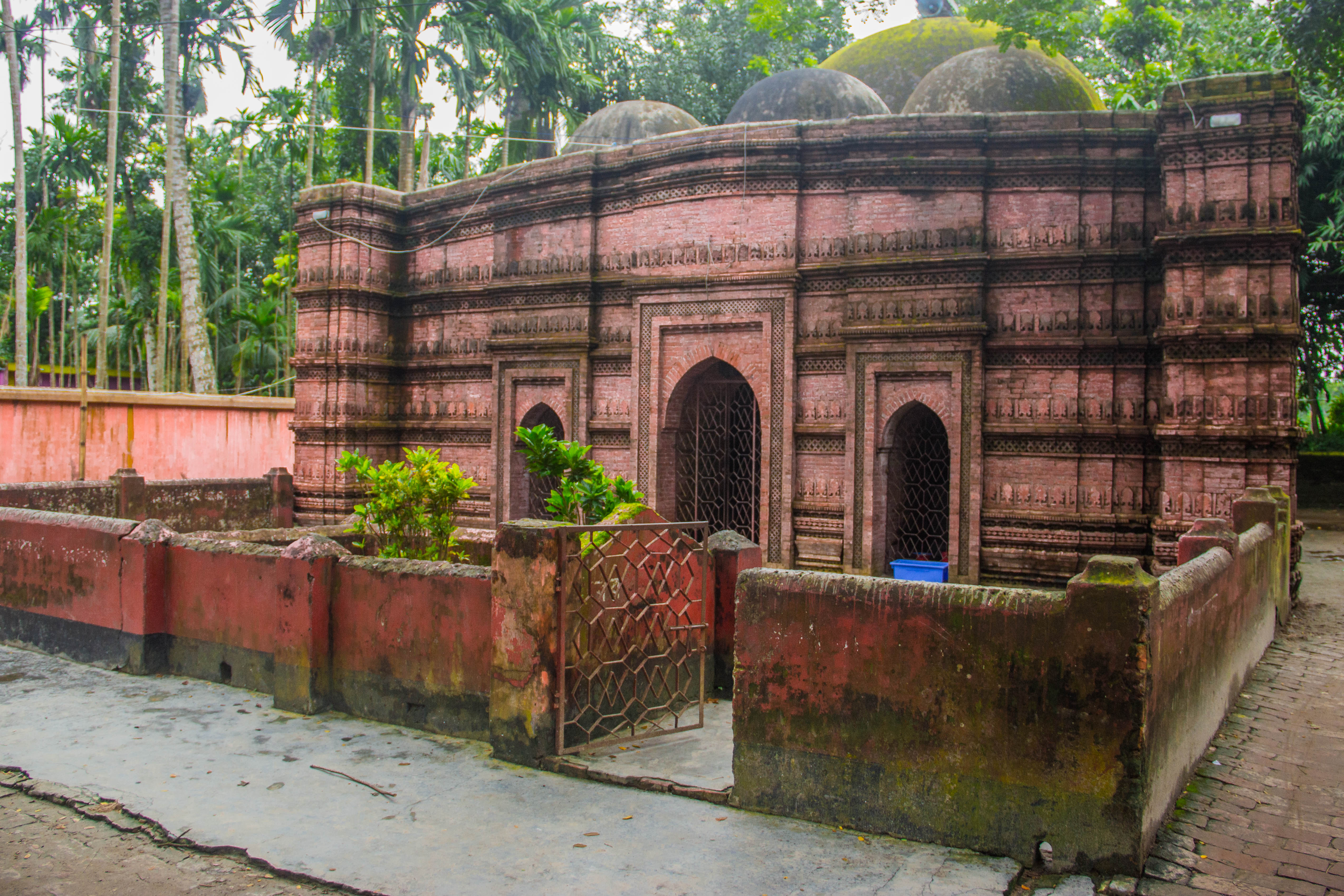
Side view

== See also ==
- List of mosques in Bangladesh
- List of archaeological sites in Bangladesh

== Bibliography ==
- Ahmed, Abu Sayeed M. (2006). Mosque Architecture in Bangladesh. UNESCO Dhaka. ISBN 978-984-32-3469-8.
- Hasan, Perween (2007-06-29). Sultans and Mosques: The Early Muslim Architecture of Bangladesh. Bloomsbury Academic. ISBN 978-1-84511-381-0.
