= Noongola Mosque =

Mosque in Jhenaidah, Bangladesh

- নুনগোলা মসজিদ
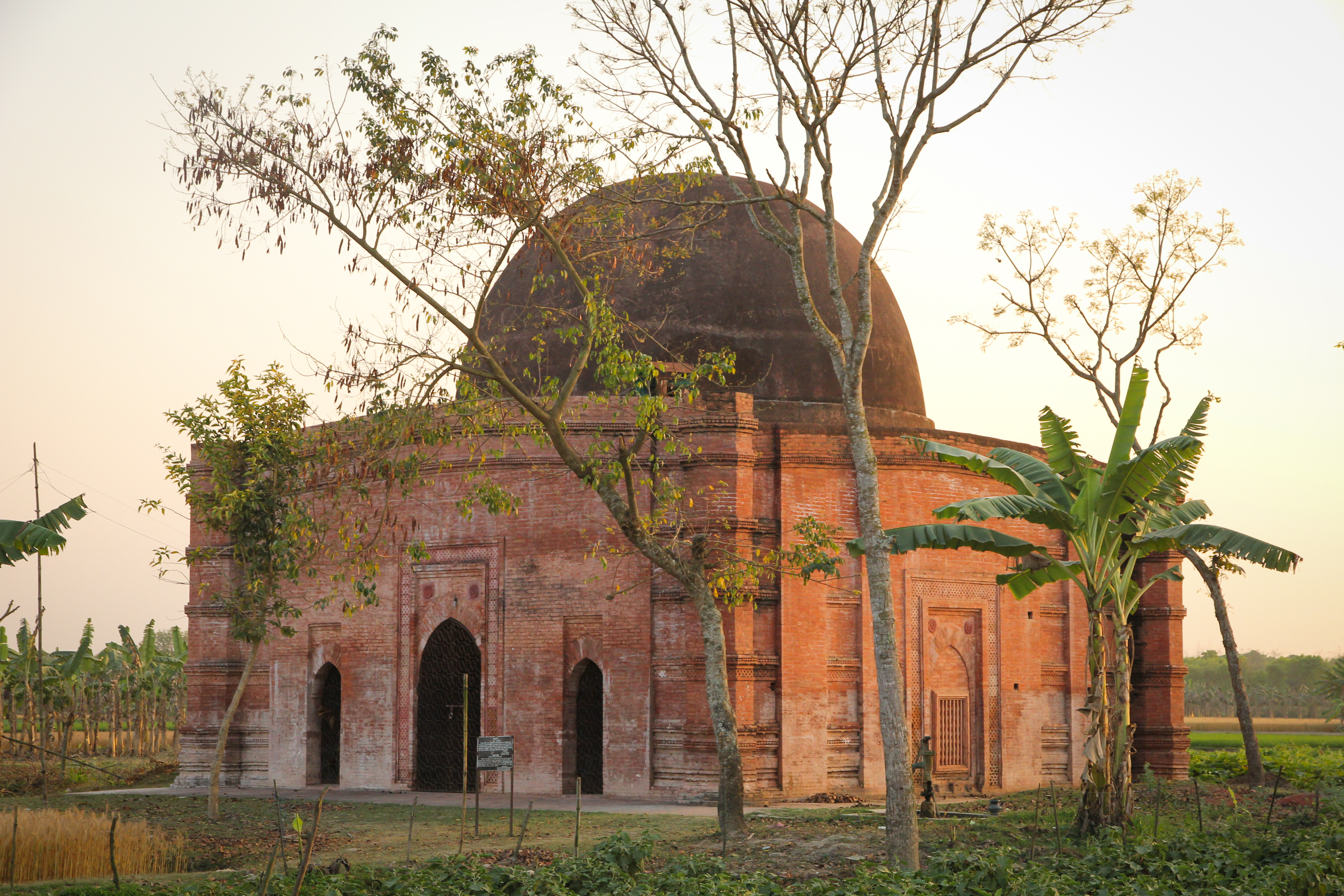
- Noongola Mosque

- Location within Bangladesh

Religion
- Affiliation: Islam
- Status: Active

Location
- Location: Kaliganj Upazila, Jhenaidah District, Bangladesh
- Interactive map of Noongola Mosque
- Administration: Department of Archeology
- Coordinates: 23.298106°N 89.147166°E

Architecture
- Type: Mosque architecture
- Style: Bengal Sultanate
- Established: Early 16th century

Specifications
- Length: 6.78 m (22.2 ft)
- Width: 6.69 m (21.9 ft)
- Interior area: 45.36 m²
- Dome: 1
- Materials: Brick

Noongola Mosque (Bengali: নুনগোলা মসজিদ) or Noongola Dhibi Mosque (Bengali: নুনগোলা ঢিবি মসজিদ) is an early 16th century Bengal Sultanate mosque located in Mithapukur village, Barobazar of Kaliganj Upazila of Jhenaidah District, and is a part of the historic mosque city of Mohammadabad. The name of the mosque indicates that the area was at some point a depot for salt collection.

== History ==
The structure, originally found in a severely dilapidated condition, was excavated by the Department of Archaeology and Museums in 1994. The original building was in ruins. Only the lower portions of the walls, including sections of the mihrab wall and the lower half of the northern mihrab, remain original. Subsequent reconstruction efforts restored the building.

== Architecture ==
It is constructed from brick, measures 6.78 by 6.69 m (22.2 by 21.9 ft) internally, with walls 1.70 m (5.6 ft) thick. The dome and upper wall sections had collapsed prior to excavation. The building features octagonal corner towers set on circular bases. The west wall contains three semicircular mihrabs, with the central mihrab being the largest, corresponding to the three entrances on the eastern facade. The northern and southern entrances are sealed with brick screens, each flanked by niches. Internally, each wall is articulated with two engaged brick pilasters, which feature merlon bases. The exterior walls are decorated with vertical offsets and recesses, the latter adorned with horizontal mouldings. The mihrabs are framed within rectangular panels displaying a mesh pattern, with the northern mihrab retaining traces of a bell and chain motif. Remnants of lime plaster are visible on the exterior southwest corner.

== Gallery ==
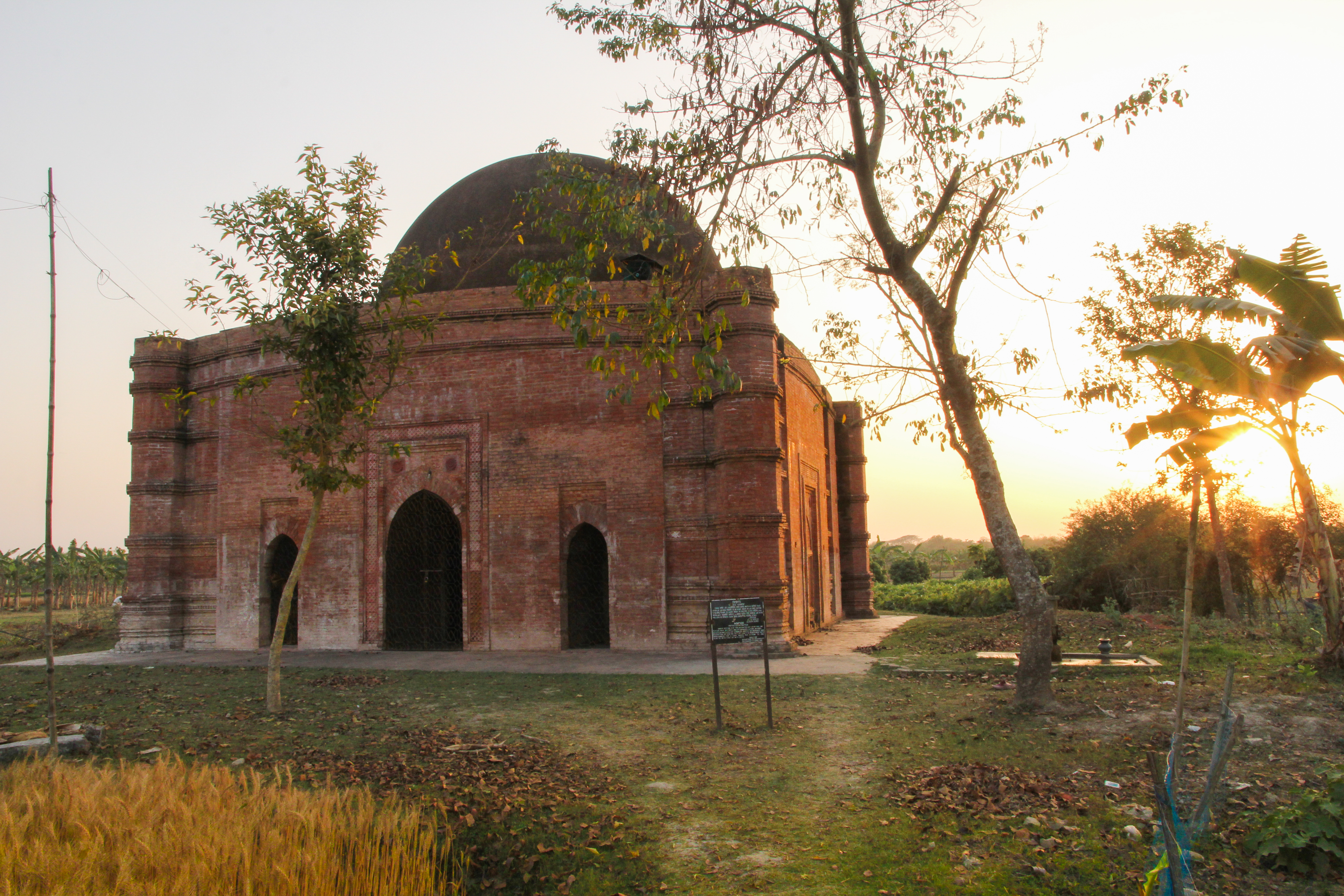
Noongola Mosque in 2014

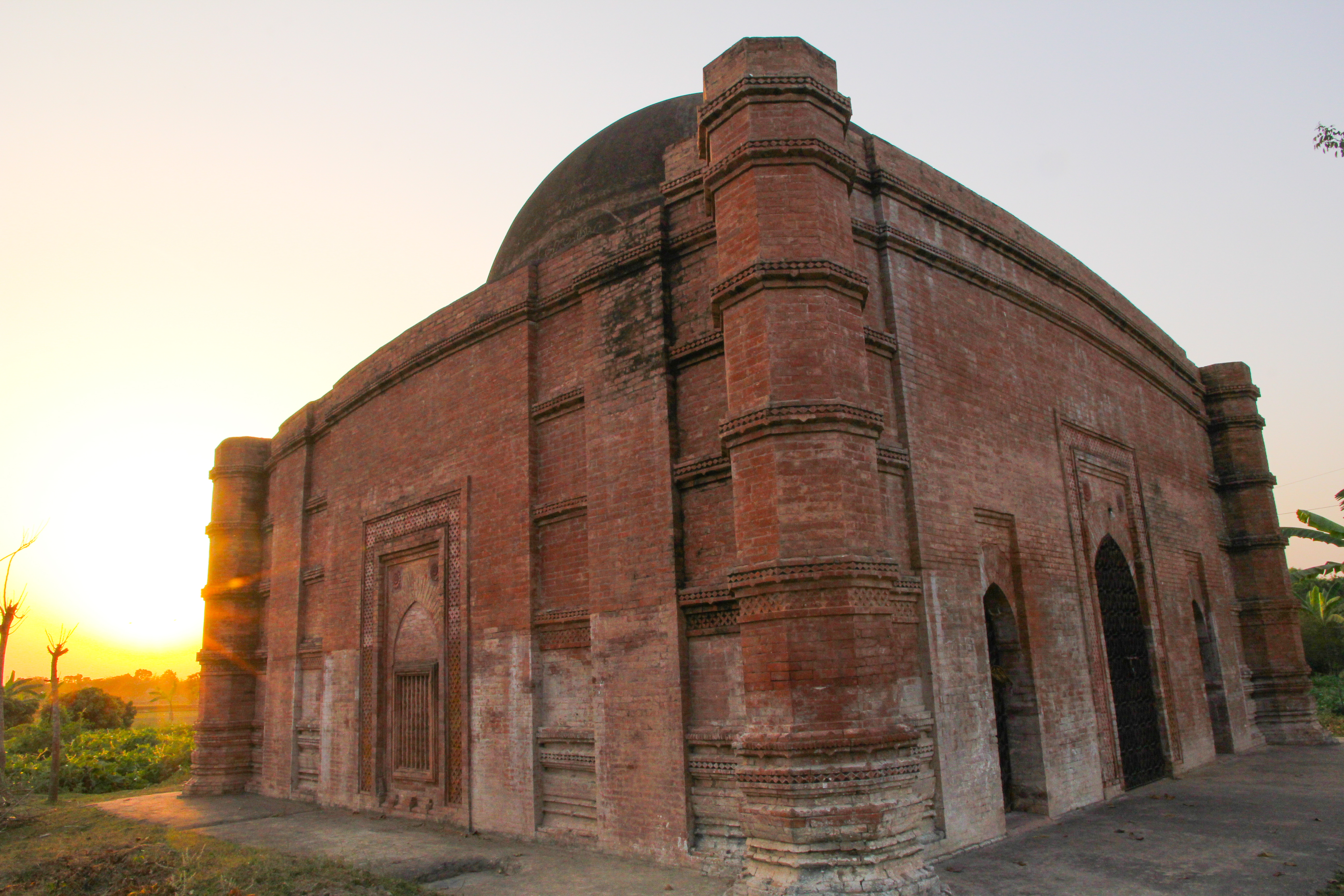
Side view of the mosque

== See also ==
- List of mosques in Bangladesh
- List of archaeological sites in Bangladesh

== Bibliography ==
- Hasan, Perween (2024). "Noongola Mosque". Sultans and Mosques: The Early Muslim Architecture of Bangladesh. Bloomsbury Academic. pp. 180–181. ISBN 978-0-7556-5360-7.
