= Chuadanga =

Town in western Bangladesh

Chuadanga চুয়াডাঙ্গা
- Town
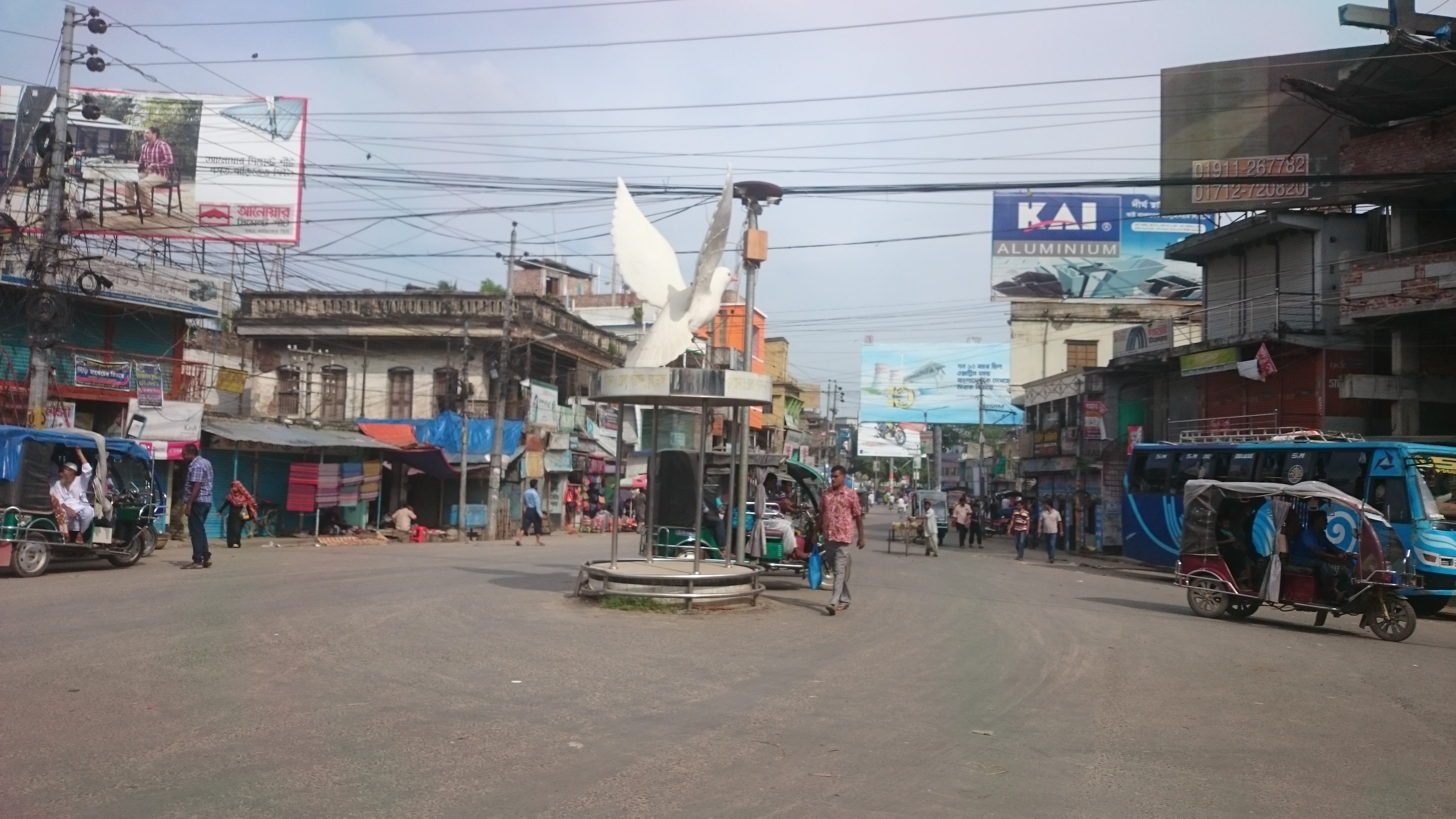
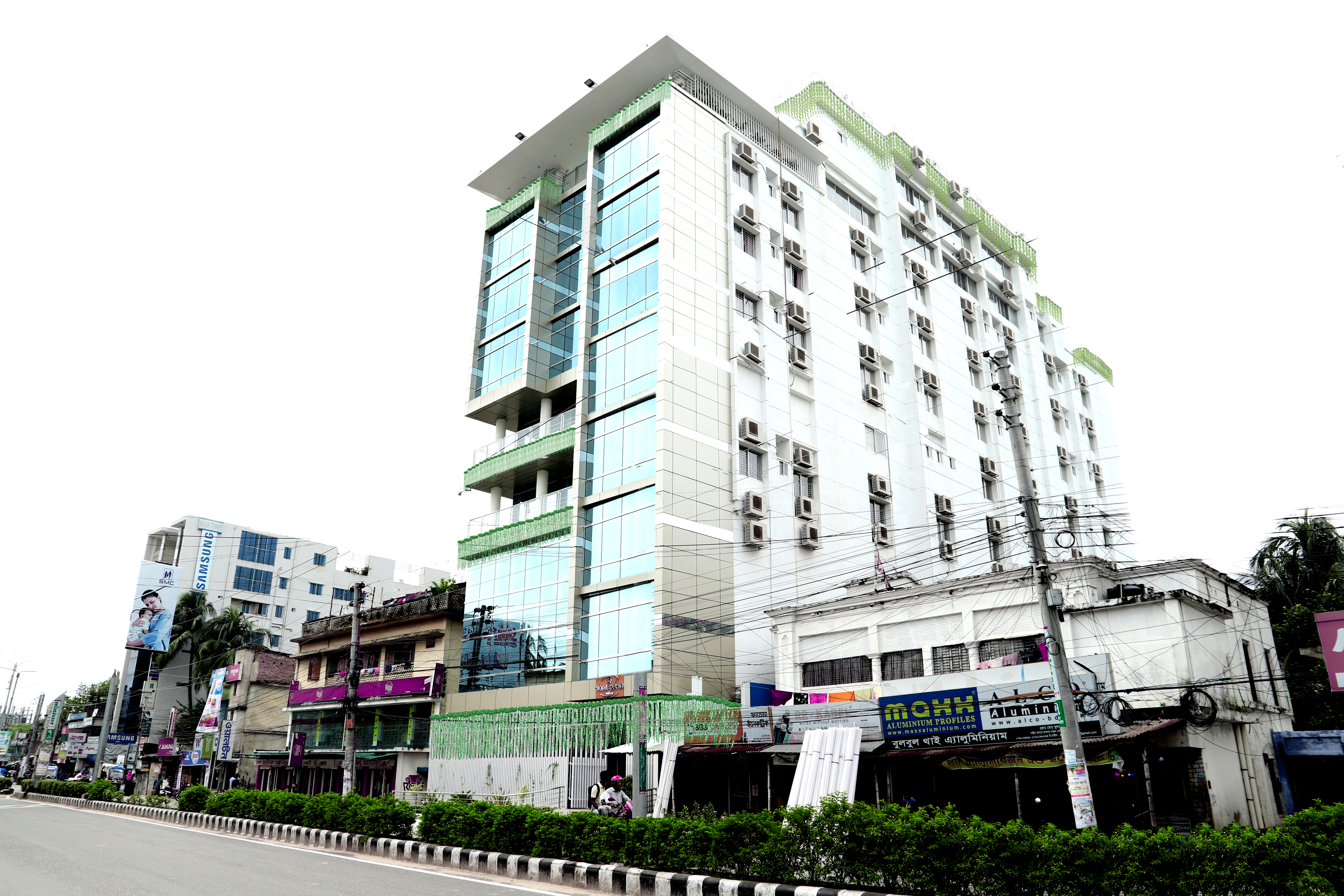
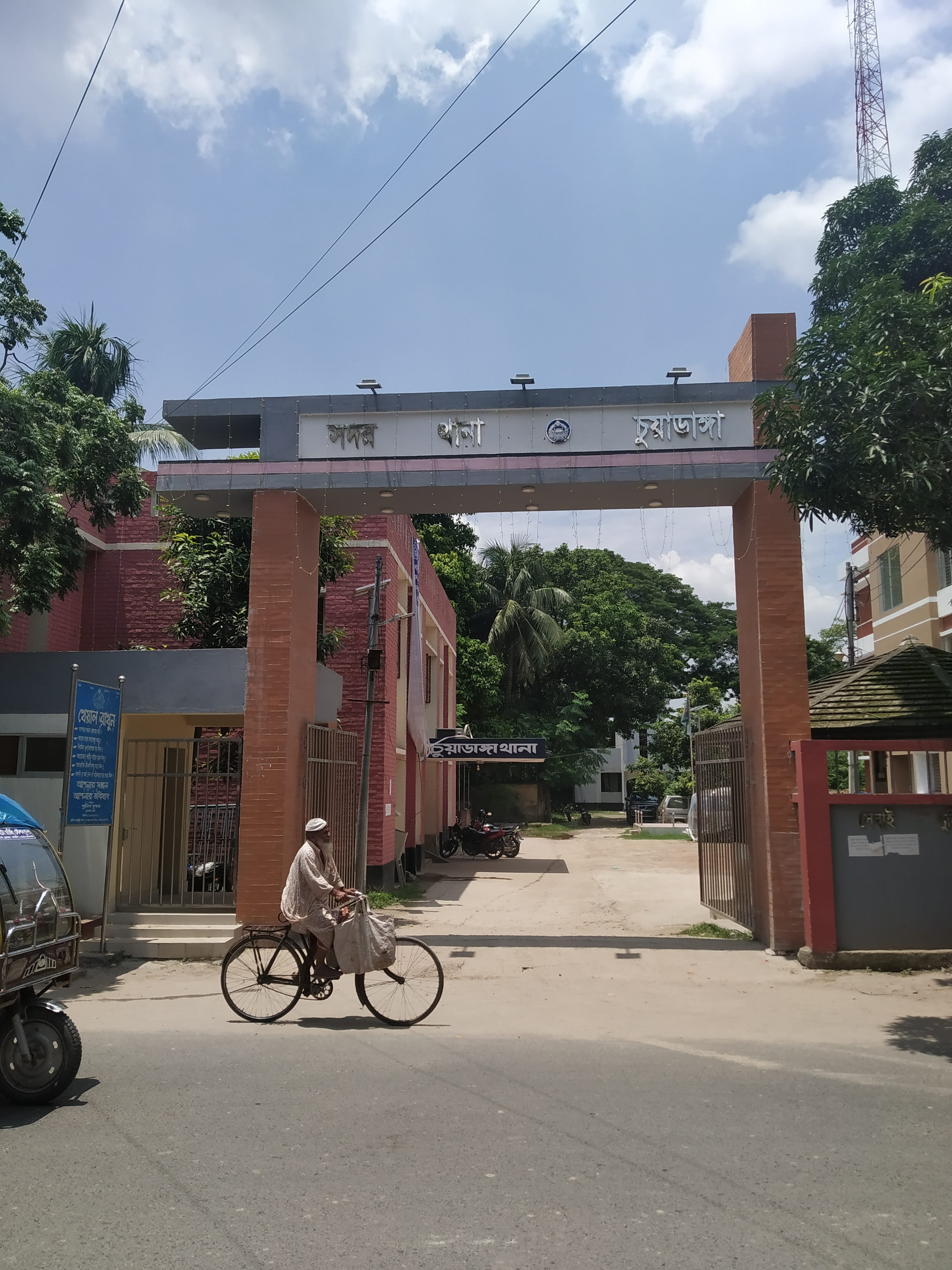
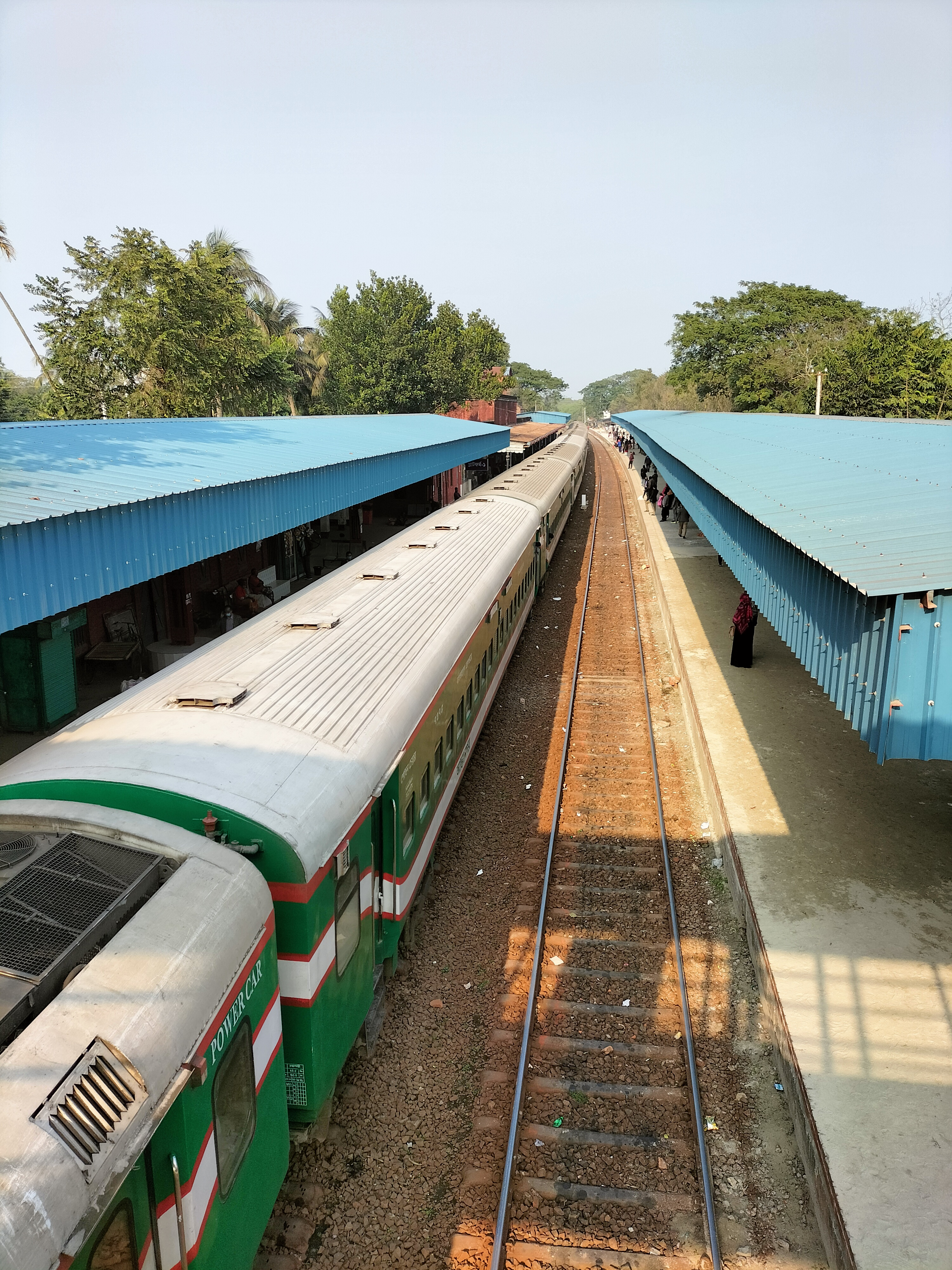
- Clockwise for top: Courastar Mor, Hotel Shahid Palace, Chuadanga Sadar Police Station, Chuadanga Railway Station

- Location in Bangladesh Chuadanga (Bangladesh)
- Coordinates: 23.643999°N 88.855637°E
- Country: Bangladesh
- Division: Khulna
- District: Chuadanga
- Upazila: Chuadanga Sadar
- Municipality: 1960

Government
  - Type: Mayor-Council
  - Body: Chuadanga Municipality
  - Mayor: Jahangir Alam Malik Khokon

Area
  - Town: 38 km^{2} (15 sq mi)
  - Metro: 67 km^{2} (26 sq mi)

Population (2022)
  - Town: 97,532
  - Density: 2,600/km^{2} (6,600/sq mi)
- Time zone: UTC+6 (Bangladesh Time)
- Postal code: 7200
- National Dialing Code: +880
- Local Dialing Code: 0761

Chuadanga Municipality mahallah geocode map

Chuadanga (Bengali: চুয়াডাঙ্গা) is a Town in western Bangladesh. It is the headquarters of Chuadanga Sadar Upazila and Chuadanga District. Located on the Mathabhanga river, Chuadanga was the first capital of Bangladesh. It was the sub-district of Kushtia district & turned into a district in 1984. In 1862, the first railway station in Bangladesh was established in Chuadanga Town. Chuadanga Town is connected by rail and road across the country.

== Demographics ==
Religions in Chuadanga Town (2011)
Religion	Percent
Islam	96.38%
Hinduism	3.58%
Other or not stated	0.04%

According to the 2022 Bangladesh census, Chuadanga Town had a population of 97,532.

According to the 2011 Bangladesh census, Chuadanga Town had 20,472 households and a population of 85,786. 15,303 (17.84%) were under 10 years of age. Chuadanga had a literacy rate (age 7 and over) of 61.72%, compared to the national average of 51.8%, and a sex ratio of 998 females per 1000 males.

== Education ==
Victoria Jubilee Government High School, founded in 1880, and Chuadanga Government Girls' High School (1914) are notable secondary schools in Chuadanga. There are many secondary schools in Chuadanga like Chuadanga Academy, Rahela khatun Girls Academy. Chuadanga Govt. College is a higher educational institute in the district. Which was founded in 1962.

== Climate ==
Climate data for Chuadanga (1991–2020, extremes 1986-present)
Month	Jan	Feb	Mar	Apr	May	Jun	Jul	Aug	Sep	Oct	Nov	Dec	Year
Record high °C (°F)	31.2 (88.2)	38.1 (100.6)	40.7 (105.3)	43.0 (109.4)	43.5 (110.3)	43.0 (109.4)	38.0 (100.4)	38.2 (100.8)	37.5 (99.5)	36.9 (98.4)	35.0 (95.0)	30.5 (86.9)	43.5 (110.3)
Mean daily maximum °C (°F)	24.2 (75.6)	28.4 (83.1)	33.4 (92.1)	35.8 (96.4)	35.6 (96.1)	34.3 (93.7)	32.9 (91.2)	33.1 (91.6)	33.1 (91.6)	32.4 (90.3)	29.8 (85.6)	25.8 (78.4)	31.6 (88.9)
Daily mean °C (°F)	16.0 (60.8)	20.2 (68.4)	25.2 (77.4)	28.7 (83.7)	29.3 (84.7)	29.2 (84.6)	28.5 (83.3)	28.6 (83.5)	28.2 (82.8)	26.5 (79.7)	22.2 (72.0)	17.7 (63.9)	25.0 (77.0)
Mean daily minimum °C (°F)	10.5 (50.9)	14.0 (57.2)	18.9 (66.0)	23.5 (74.3)	25.0 (77.0)	26.1 (79.0)	26.2 (79.2)	26.2 (79.2)	25.7 (78.3)	23.3 (73.9)	17.6 (63.7)	12.6 (54.7)	20.8 (69.4)
Record low °C (°F)	3.9 (39.0)	6.8 (44.2)	9.5 (49.1)	17.0 (62.6)	19.3 (66.7)	21.6 (70.9)	21.2 (70.2)	20.0 (68.0)	21.2 (70.2)	16.5 (61.7)	10.4 (50.7)	5.6 (42.1)	3.9 (39.0)
Average precipitation mm (inches)	10 (0.4)	24 (0.9)	27 (1.1)	55 (2.2)	157 (6.2)	226 (8.9)	329 (13.0)	227 (8.9)	271 (10.7)	129 (5.1)	15 (0.6)	10 (0.4)	1,480 (58.3)
Average precipitation days (≥ 1 mm)	2	2	3	5	10	15	21	19	16	8	2	1	104
Average relative humidity (%)	78	72	65	68	74	83	86	86	86	83	78	78	78
Mean monthly sunshine hours	200.3	216.5	240.2	237.7	227.2	167.3	136.9	150.4	161.4	212.7	216.6	200.6	2,367.8
Source 1: NOAA
Source 2: Bangladesh Meteorological Department (humidity 1981–2010)
