= Victoria Jubilee Government High School =

Public school in Chuadanga, Bangladesh

Victoria Jubilee (V.J) Government High School
- ভিক্টোরিয়া জুবিলি সরকারি উচ্চ বিদ্যালয়

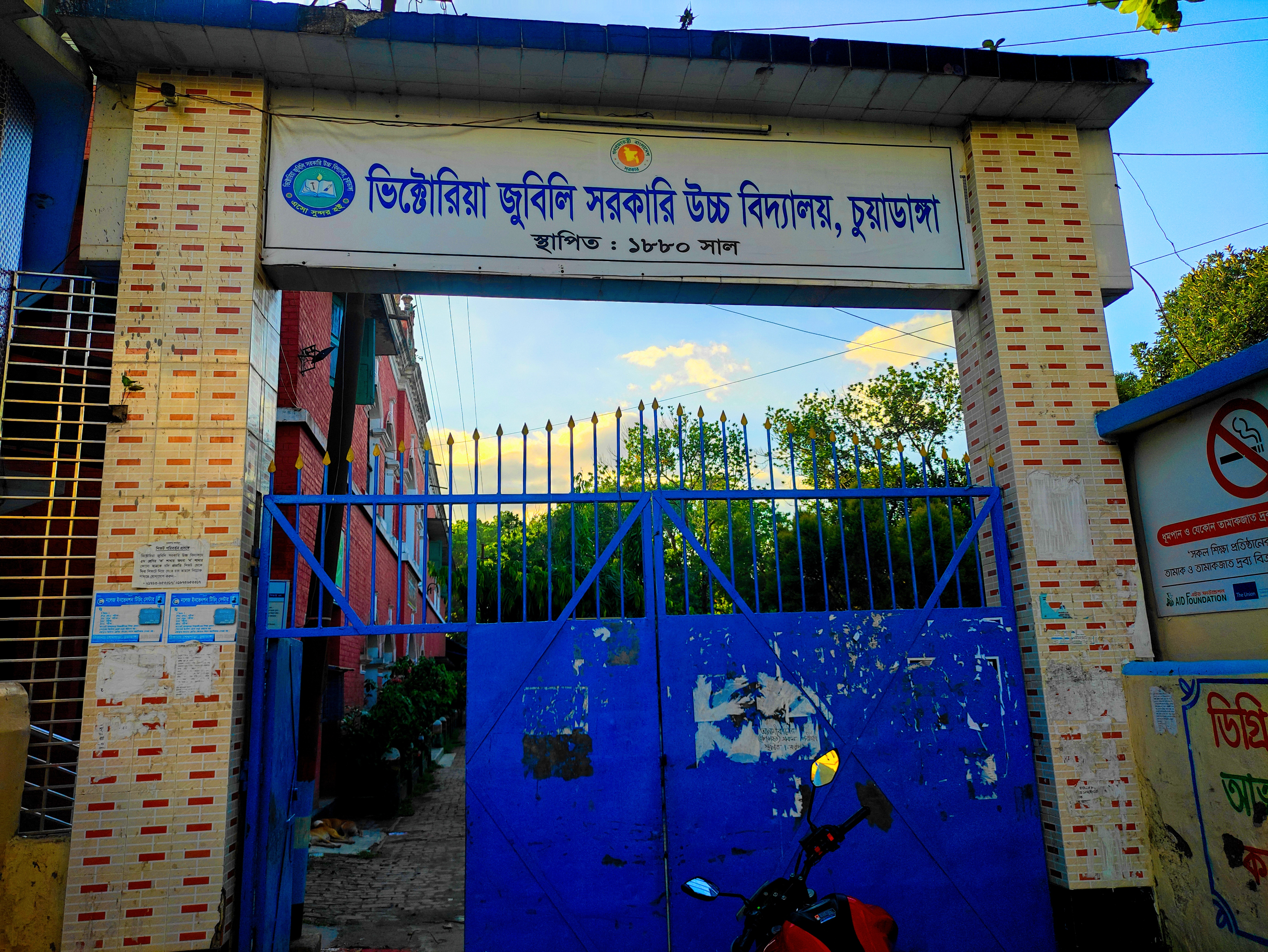

Location
- V.J. School Road, Chuadanga, Bangladesh; 23°38′41″N 88°50′37″E

Information
- Other name: V.J. Government High school (Bengali: ভি,জে, সরকারি উচ্চ বিদ্যালয় )
- School type: Public
- Mottoes: এসো সুন্দর হই (Let's be beautiful)
- Established: 1880
- Founder: Abul Hossain Joarder
- School board: Board of Intermediate and Secondary Education, Jashore
- School district: Chuadanga
- Administrator: Md. Jahidul Islam
- Headmaster: Mst. Jesmin Ara Khatun
- Faculty: 60 (4 per class)
- Teaching staff: 53
- Gender: Male
- Enrollment: 2300+
- Classes: 3-10
- Language: Bengali
- Slogan: 'এসো সুন্দর হই'
- Nickname: VJ School
- Website: vjghs.edu.bd

Victoria Jubilee Government High School (V.J. Government High School for short) is the oldest high school in the Chuadanga district and one of the oldest schools in Bangladesh. The school was established at Chuadanga Sadar in 1880. Victoria Jubilee Government High School has had a unique contribution and identity since pre-independence times. During the war of liberation, freedom fighters were trained in the school. The school is located on the banks of the Mathabhanga River in Chuadanga district. The school is divided into two shifts, morning and day. The school offers classes from third to tenth.

Although it is a boys' school only, it has both male and female teachers. The school has a head teacher and separate assistant head teachers and teachers for day and morning branches.

== History ==
The school was established in 1880 with the efforts of the late Abul Hossain Joarddar, a local zamindar. At the time of establishment, this school was named S. E. School. Later, this school was promoted to H.E. School. He donated seven acres of land. He is the founding headmaster of the school. There is a common saying in this regard: "Abul Hossain Joarddar built a school in Chuadanga town from house to house to light the light of knowledge. Mr. Manmathanath Gui became the headmaster of the school and played an important role in its development. The school was named Victoria Jubilee High School on the occasion of the Silver Jubilee of the reign of the then Queen Victoria of England on 16 February 1887.

Initially, the school started in a tin house, but in 1928, a tin house was replaced by a pucca building. The school was made official on February 1, 1980. Since then, the name of the school has been associated with the Government, meaning V.J. Government High School (full: Victoria Jubilee Government High School). The active participation of the students of this school in the language movement of 1952 and the war of independence of 1971 has further enriched the history of Chuadanga district. The school has been recognised as the best school by the people of the district by achieving good results in all types of examinations by the Board of Education. The number of students is increasing. Therefore, the school was transformed into a double shift in 2011 to maintain the quality of education and provide opportunities for more students to study. Since the establishment of the school, the abbreviated form of the name of the school has become popular and has been used in all cases. However, on March 30, 2022, in a letter signed by the Director General of DSHE, Nehal Ahmed, in a brief signed by the Directorate of Secondary and Higher Education, Ministry of Education, Bangladesh. The former headmaster of the school, Md. Bilal Hossain completed the work of writing the full name and founding time.

== Infrastructure ==
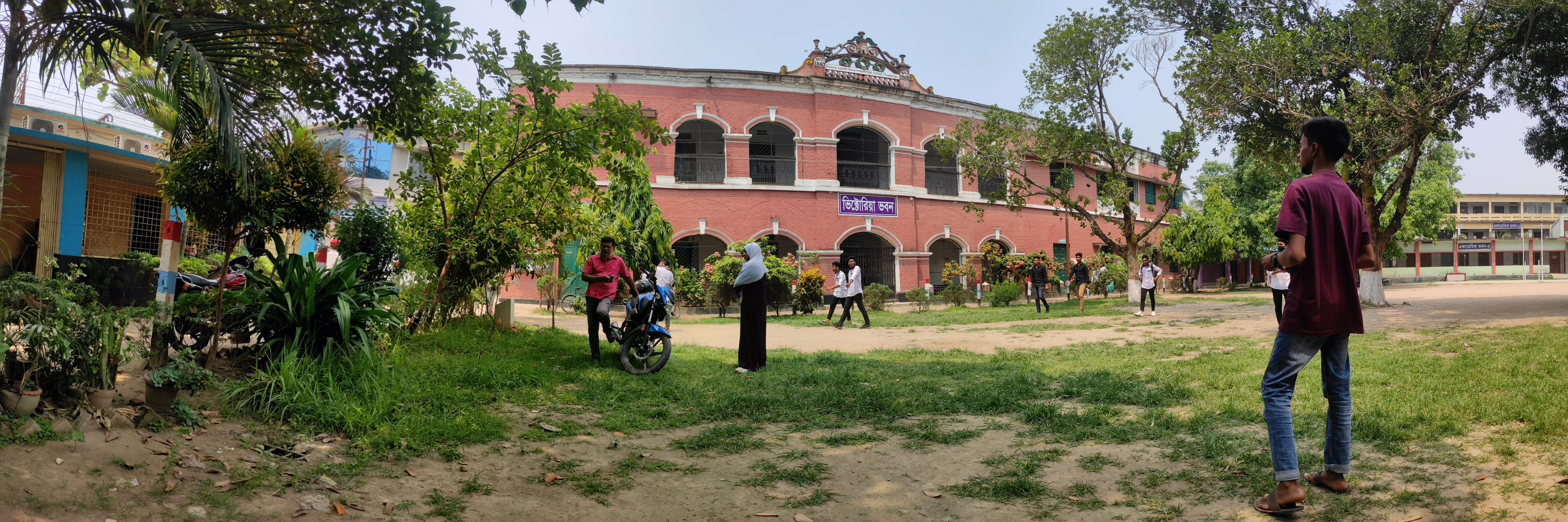
Panorama view of Victoria Jubilee Government High School

Victoria Jubilee Government High School has two grounds, one inside the school and the other outside the school. The school has a four-storey, three-storey, and five-storey building with two dormitories and several one-storey buildings. The school also has an auditorium with a bicycle garage, a motorcycle garage, a two-storey mosque, a clean water plant, and a permanent stage. In addition to a computer lab, there are two permanent multimedia classrooms and four separate labs for teaching physics, chemistry, biology and agriculture. There is a library here. There is also a Shaheed Minar on one side of the school grounds.

== Admission ==
In the school, students mainly get the opportunity to get admission in the third and sixth class. Eligible students are selected through a highly competitive admission test. Thousands of students participated in the admission test. In the third class, 60 students are admitted to each branch. A total of 240 people can be admitted, including 120 in the morning shift and 120 in the day shift. In addition, a total of 24 students can be admitted in the sixth class, including 12 in the morning shift and 12 in the day shift. The admissions process ends in December.

== Class activities ==
School activities are divided into two shifts: morning and day. Class activities are completed in both shifts by dividing the school into Six Periods. Morning shift class activities start at 7:30 am and end at 12 pm. The day shift class activities start at 12:30 pm and end at 4.50 pm. However, this period is only for the sixth to tenth class; third to fifth class activities are a bit less. Both shifts have a break of 30 minutes after the third period. During this time, students are given tiffins. Every day homework at school has to be written in the diary provided by the school.

== Former students ==
- Solaiman Haque Joarder, MP, Bangladesh

== Gallery ==
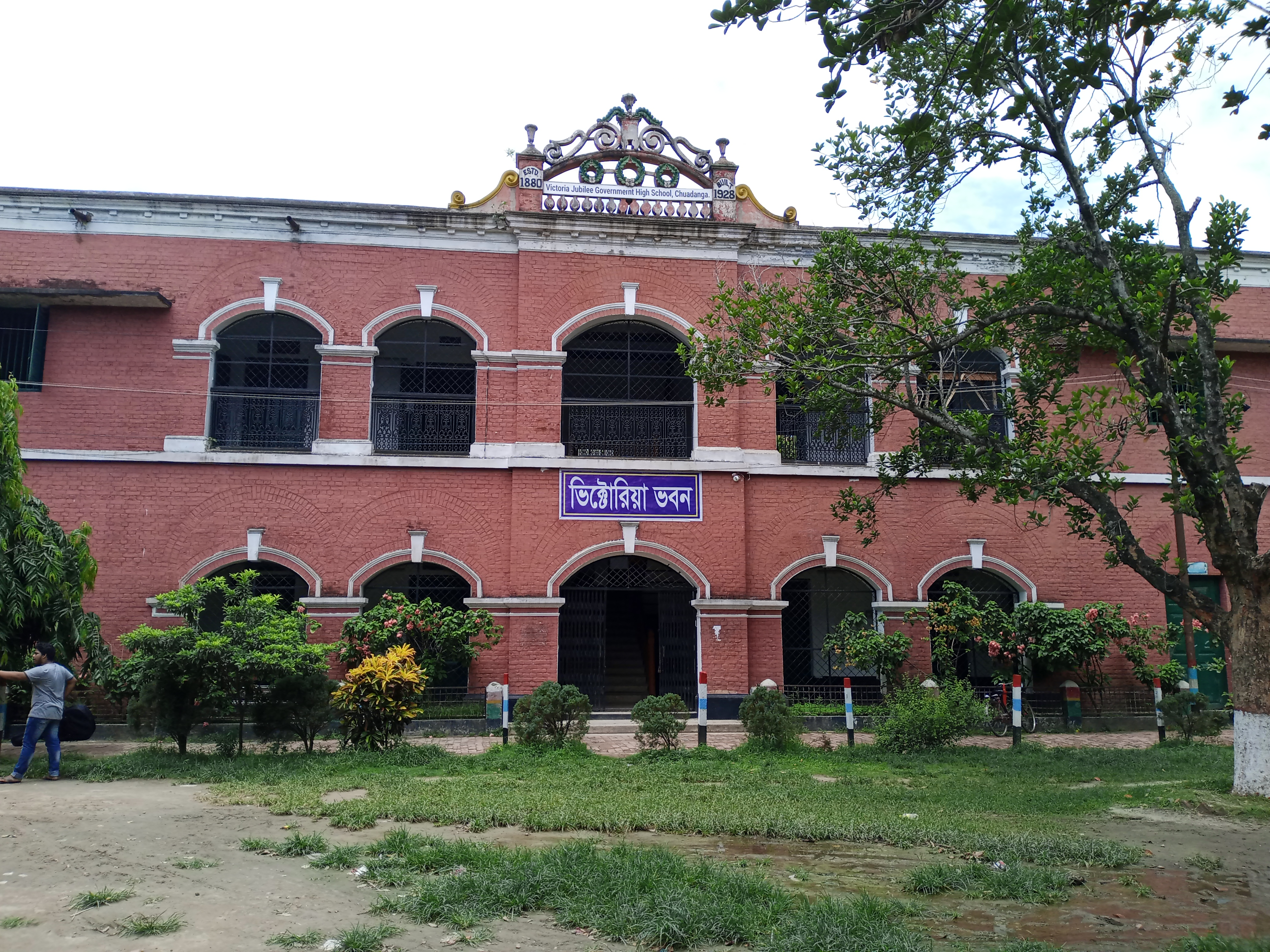
Victoria Building

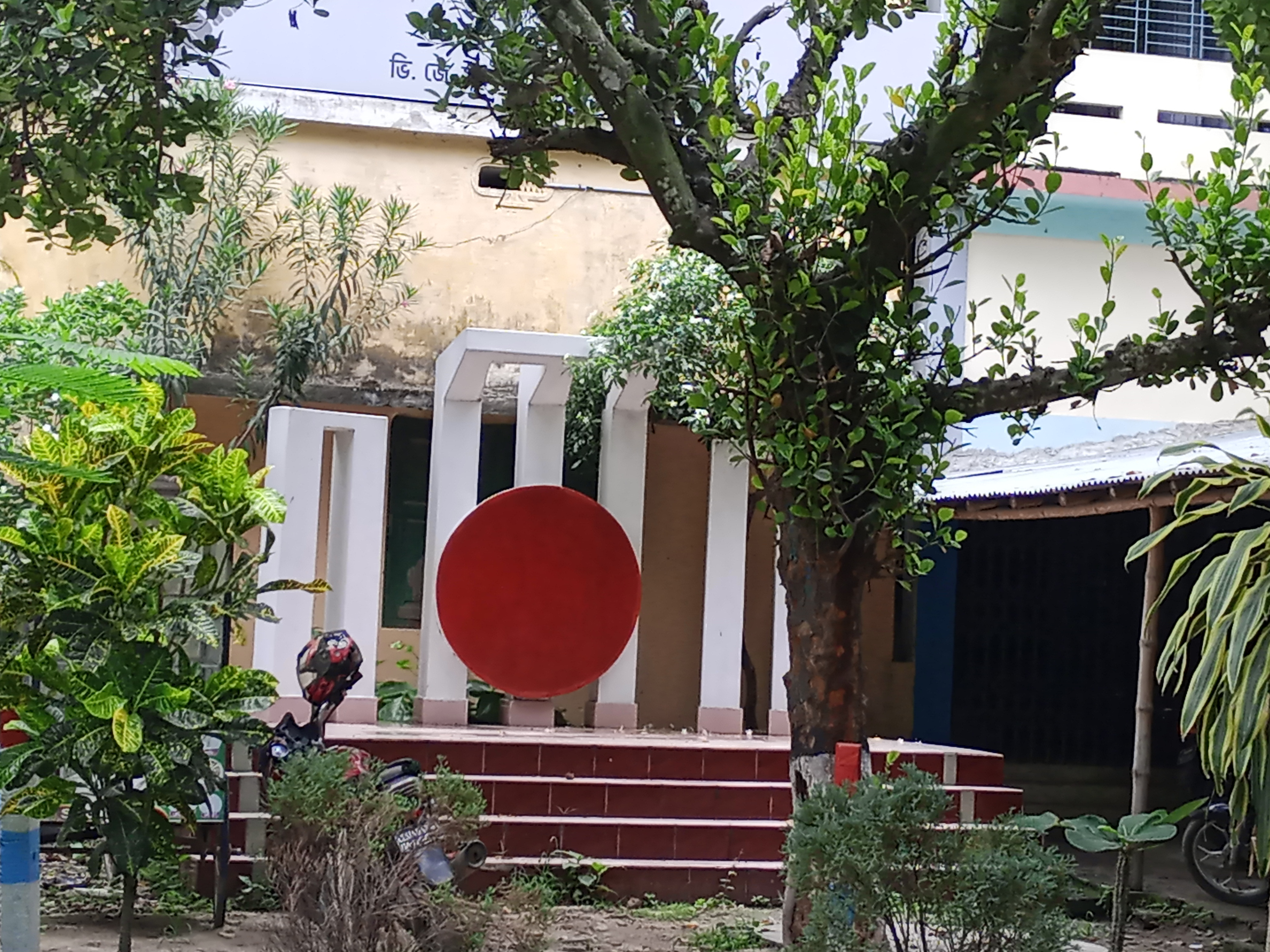
Shaheed Minar
