= Begumpur Union =

Begumpur Union বেগমপুর ইউনিয়ন
- Union
- Begumpur Union
- Location within Bangladesh
- Coordinates: 23.5265°N 88.8707°E
- Country: Bangladesh
- Division: Khulna
- District: Chuadanga
- Upazila: Chuadanga Sadar

Area
  - Total: 145.03 km^{2} (56.00 sq mi)

Population (2011)
  - Total: 30,061
  - Density: 207.27/km^{2} (536.84/sq mi)
- Time zone: UTC+6 (BST)
- Website: begumpur.chuadanga.gov.bd

Begumpur Union (Bengali: বেগমপুর ইউনিয়ন) is a union parishad of Chuadanga Sadar Upazila, in Chuadanga District, Khulna Division of Bangladesh. The union has an area of 145.03 square kilometres (56.00 sq mi) and as of 2001 had a population of 43,527. There are 20 villages and 19 mouzas in the union.
