= Kutubpur Union, Chuadanga Sadar =

Kutubpur Union কুতুবপুর ইউনিয়ন
- Union
- Kutubpur Union
- Location within Bangladesh
- Coordinates: 23.8168°N 88.6274°E
- Country: Bangladesh
- Division: Khulna
- District: Chuadanga
- Upazila: Chuadanga Sadar

Area
  - Total: 51.80 km^{2} (20.00 sq mi)

Population (2011)
  - Total: 28,361
  - Density: 547.5/km^{2} (1,418/sq mi)
- Time zone: UTC+6 (BST)
- Website: kutubpur.chuadanga.gov.bd

Kutubpur Union (Bengali: কুতুবপুর ইউনিয়ন) is a union parishad of Chuadanga Sadar Upazila, in Chuadanga District, Khulna Division of Bangladesh. The union has an area of 51.80 square kilometres (20.00 sq mi) and as of 2001 had a population of 28,361. There are 19 villages and 9 mouzas in the union.
