= Shankarchandra Union =

Shankarchandra Union শংকরচন্দ্র ইউনিয়ন
- Union
- Shankarchandra Union
- Location within Bangladesh
- Coordinates: 23.6062°N 88.8868°E
- Country: Bangladesh
- Division: Khulna
- District: Chuadanga
- Upazila: Chuadanga Sadar

Area
  - Total: 128.20 km^{2} (49.50 sq mi)

Population (2011)
  - Total: 49,319
  - Density: 384.70/km^{2} (996.38/sq mi)
- Time zone: UTC+6 (BST)
- Website: shankarchandra.chuadanga.gov.bd

Shankarchandra Union (Bengali: শংকরচন্দ্র ইউনিয়ন) is a union parishad of Chuadanga Sadar Upazila, in Chuadanga District, Khulna Division of Bangladesh. The union has an area of 128.20 square kilometres (49.50 sq mi) and as of 2001 had a population of 49,319. There are 22 villages and 18 mouzas in the union.
