= Mominpur Union =

Mominpur Union মোমিনপুর ইউনিয়ন
- Union
- Mominpur Union
- Location within Bangladesh
- Coordinates: 23.6784°N 88.8900°E
- Country: Bangladesh
- Division: Khulna
- District: Chuadanga
- Upazila: Chuadanga Sadar

Area
  - Total: 47.83 km^{2} (18.47 sq mi)

Population (2011)
  - Total: 13,164
  - Density: 275.2/km^{2} (712.8/sq mi)
- Time zone: UTC+6 (BST)
- Website: mominpur.chuadanga.gov.bd

Mominpur Union (Bengali: মোমিনপুর ইউনিয়ন) is a union parishad situated at Chuadanga Sadar Upazila, in Chuadanga District, Khulna Division of Bangladesh. The union has an area of 47.83 square kilometres (18.47 sq mi) and as of 2001 had a population of 13,164. There are 12 villages and 5 mouzas in the union.

== Villages ==
1. Boalmari
2. Mominpur
3. Nilmoniganj
4. Amirpur
5. Sharishadanga
6. Palm tree
7. Thengramaari
8. Sholagari
9. Chandpur
10. Kabikhali
11. Fishpond
12. Kathuli
