= Padmabila Union =

Padmabila Union পদ্মবিলা ইউনিয়ন
- Union
- Padmabila Union
- Location within Bangladesh
- Coordinates: 23.6134°N 88.8862°E
- Country: Bangladesh
- Division: Khulna
- District: Chuadanga
- Upazila: Chuadanga Sadar

Area
  - Total: 12.95 km^{2} (5.00 sq mi)

Population (2011)
  - Total: 31,000
  - Density: 2,400/km^{2} (6,200/sq mi)
- Time zone: UTC+6 (BST)
- Website: padmabila.chuadanga.gov.bd

Padmabila Union (Bengali: পদ্মবিলা ইউনিয়ন) is a union parishad of Chuadanga Sadar Upazila, in Chuadanga District, Khulna Division of Bangladesh. The union has an area of 12.95 square kilometres (5.00 sq mi) and as of 2001 had a population of 31,000. There are 15 villages and 9 mouzas in the union.
