= Alukdia Union =

Alukdia Union আলুকদিয়া ইউনিয়ন
- Union
- Location within Bangladesh
- Coordinates: 23.6627°N 88.8244°E
- Country: Bangladesh
- Division: Khulna
- District: Chuadanga
- Upazila: Chuadanga Sadar

Area
  - Total: 51.80 km^{2} (20.00 sq mi)

Population (2011)
  - Total: 30,061
  - Density: 580.3/km^{2} (1,503/sq mi)
- Time zone: UTC+6 (BST)
- Website: alukdia.chuadanga.gov.bd

Alukdia Union (Bengali: আলুকদিয়া ইউনিয়ন) is a union parishad situated at Chuadanga Sadar Upazila, in Chuadanga District, Khulna Division of Bangladesh. The union has an area of 51.80 square kilometres (20.00 sq mi) and as of 2001 had a population of 30,061. There are 10 villages and 3 mouzas in the union.
