= Mosque city of Mohammadabad =

Mohammadabad
- Location: Baro Bazar Union, Kaliganj Upazila, Jhenaidah District, Bangladesh
- Nearest city: Jhenaidah

History
- Founded: 15th century

Site notes
- Architectural style: Bengal Sultanate
- Owner: Department of Archaeology, Bangladesh

The Mosque city of Mohammadabad is an archaeological and historical site located in Barobazar Union of Kaliganj Upazila, in Jhenaidah District. The site is associated with the Bengal Sultanate period and is notable for its concentration of medieval mosques and Islamic architectural remains. Mohammadabad is considered one of the important historic urban centres of southwestern Bengal and is sometimes referred to as an ancient “city of mosques”.

== History ==
Mohammadabad emerged during the period of the Bengal Sultanate in the 15th century. Historians and archaeologists believe the city developed as a regional administrative and religious centre linked to trade and settlement networks in southern Bengal.

The site is spread over approximately three square kilometres around present-day Barobazar Union. Archaeological surveys have identified more than fifteen historic sites in the area, including numerous mosques dating from the Sultanate era.

== Archaeological significance ==
Mohammadabad is regarded as one of the major medieval Islamic archaeological zones in Bangladesh. Researchers have compared its significance with other Sultanate-era urban centres due to the density of religious structures and surviving ruins.

The area has 15 archeological sites, covering a total area of 3 km with nine mosques, and cemetries at Baro Bazar Union.

== Architecture ==
The mosques of Mohammadabad display architectural features characteristic of the Bengal Sultanate style. The structures were primarily built with baked brick, reflecting the scarcity of stone in Bengal. Architectural historians have noted similarities between the mosques of Mohammadabad and those of the historic Bagerhat mosque city established by Khan Jahan Ali.

== Notable mosques ==
=== Galakata Mosque ===
The Galakata Mosque is the best-preserved mosque, stylistically this identical to the Khan Jahan Ali architecture, found in the Mosque City of Bagerhat and the mosque of Baba Adam Shahid in Munshiganj District.

=== Gorar Mosque ===
The Gorar Mosque is one of the more prominent mosques at Mohammadabad. The mosque is believed to date from the 15th century and is considered contemporary with the Khan Jahan Ali architectural tradition.

The structure consists of a square prayer chamber covered by a large dome and an eastern porch topped by three smaller domes. The mosque contains three mihrabs aligned with the eastern entrances.

=== Jorbangla Mosque ===
The Jorbangla Mosque reportedly had twin huts near the mosque. An inscription on the mosque states that it had been constructed during the reign of Sultan Ghiyasuddin Mahmud Shah Sultan.

=== Noongola Mosque ===
The Noongola Mosque is a square shaped mosque.

=== Satgachia Mosque ===
The Satgachia Mosque is a ruined multi-domed mosque discovered in 1978. Archaeologists estimate that it originally contained thirty-five domes supported by rows of stone and brick pillars.

The mosque is regarded as one of the larger Sultanate-period mosques in the region and has been partially restored by the Department of Archaeology.

=== Shukur Mallik Mosque ===
It is a square-shaped mosque that looks like Binat Bibi Mosque in Dhaka.

== See also ==
- Architecture of Bangladesh
- Mosque City of Bagerhat
- Gaur
- Panam City
- Bengal Sultanate
