= Chuadanga Government College =

Government college of Bangladesh

Coordinates: 23.6402°N 88.8486°E

- চুয়াডাঙ্গা সরকারি কলেজ
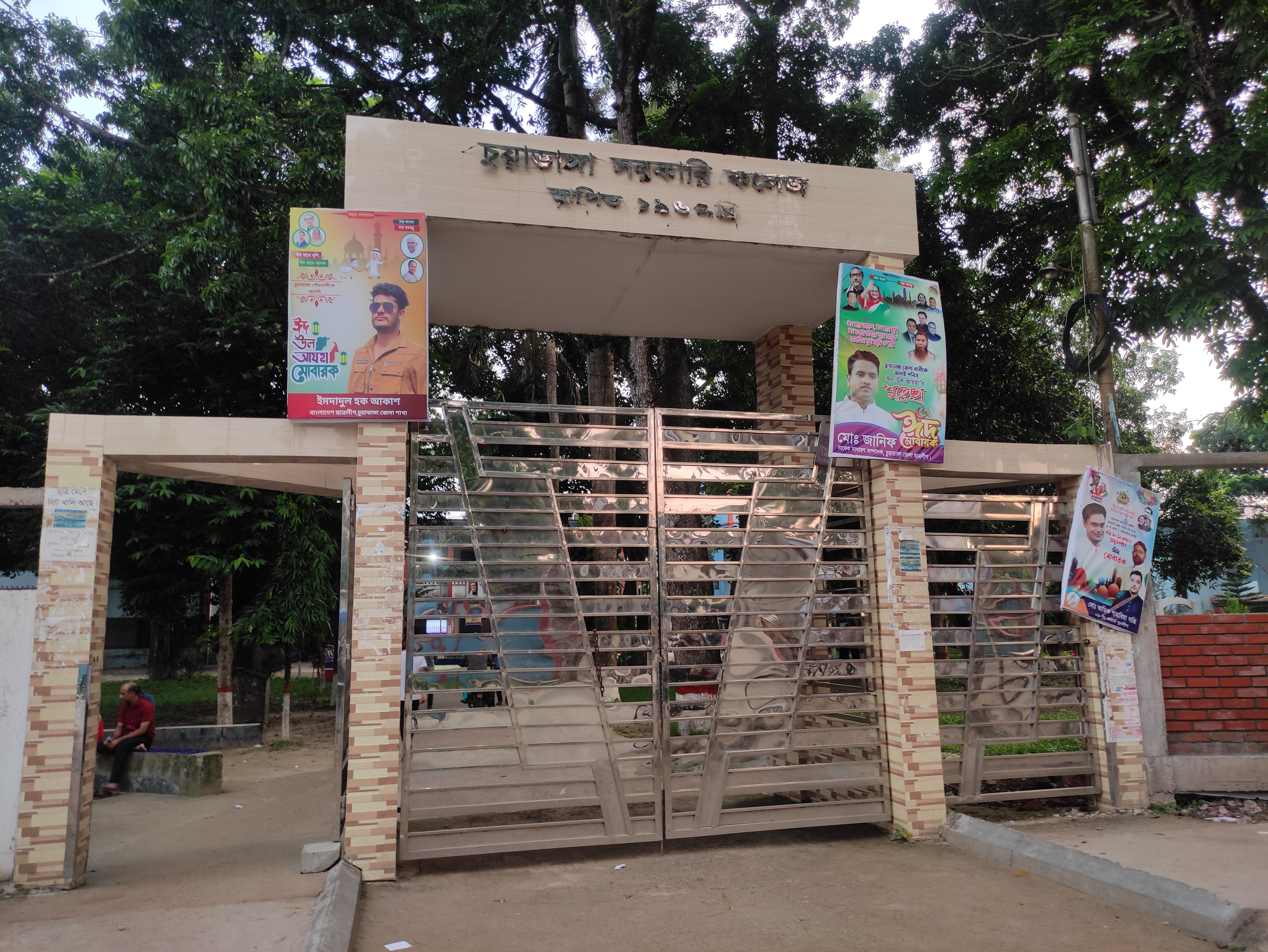
- Main gate of Chuadanga Government College
- Type: Government college
- Established: 1962
- Affiliations: National University
- Students: 12,586
- Location: Chuadanga, Chuadanga District, Bangladesh
- Campus: City, 18 acre (0.0728434km^{2})
- Website: Official Website

Chuadanga Government College (Bengali: চুয়াডাঙ্গা সরকারি কলেজ) is an educational institution in the municipality of Chuadanga, headquarters of Chuadanga District, in western Bangladesh. Founded in 1962, it is the oldest college in the district. It was nationalized on 7 May 1979. It is affiliated to National University.

== Campus ==
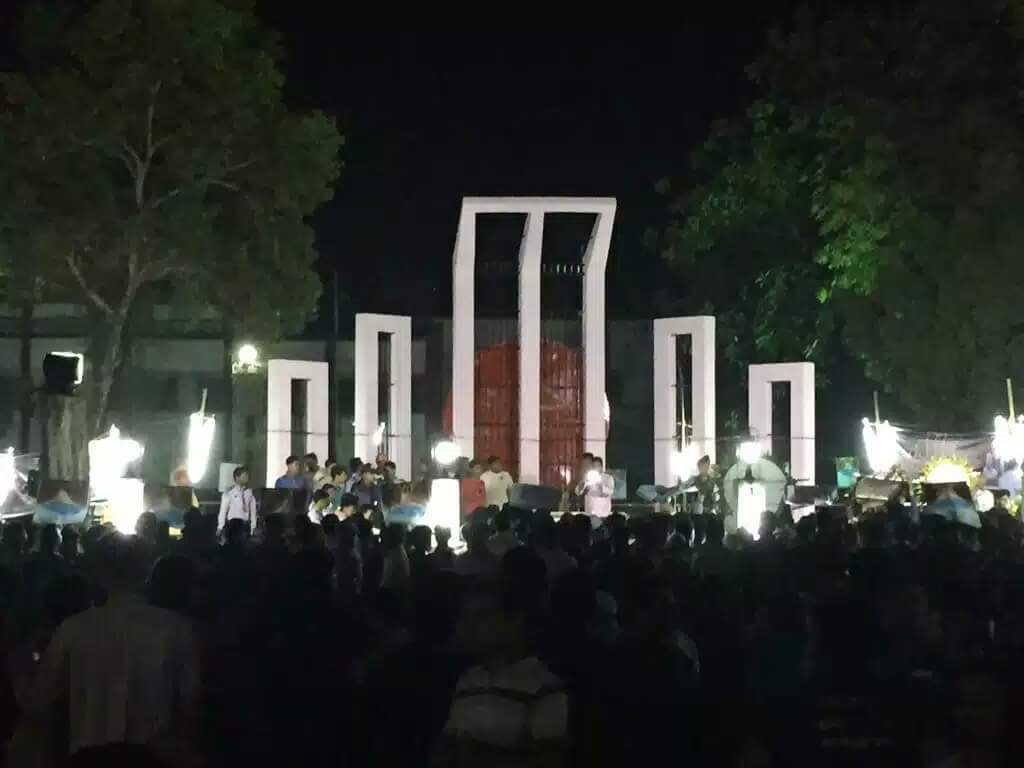
The college's Shaheed Minar (martyr's monument) on Language Movement Day in 2016

The students are on an 18-acre campus with eight college buildings.

== Amount of land ==
The total land area of Chuadanga Government College is 18 acres.

== Students ==
Today, the college has more than 12,586 students.

== Teaching staffs ==
Agricultural education, computer education, botany, zoology, chemistry, Bengali, English, economics, political science, philosophy, history and culture of Islam, history, management and accounting, Bengali, economics, political science, history and accountancy classes of Islam are conducted by 74 teachers.

== Voluntary organizations ==
BNCC, Rover Scout, Red Crescent, TTH etc.
