= Titudah Union =

Titudah Union তিতুদহ ইউনিয়ন
- Union
- Location within Bangladesh
- Coordinates: 23.5445°N 88.9084°E
- Country: Bangladesh
- Division: Khulna
- District: Chuadanga
- Upazila: Chuadanga Sadar

Area
  - Total: 121.73 km^{2} (47.00 sq mi)

Population (2011)
  - Total: 40,123
  - Density: 329.61/km^{2} (853.68/sq mi)
- Time zone: UTC+6 (BST)
- Website: titudah.chuadanga.gov.bd

Titudah Union (Bengali: তিতুদহ ইউনিয়ন) is a union parishad of Chuadanga Sadar Upazila, Chuadanga District, Khulna Division, Bangladesh. The union has an area of 121.73 square kilometres (47.00 sq mi) and as of 2001 had a population of 40,123. There are 26 villages and 21 mouzas in the union.
