= Baro Bazar Union =

Baro Bazar Union বারবাজার ইউনিয়ন
- Union
- Location within Bangladesh
- Coordinates: 23.3060°N 89.1593°E
- Country: Bangladesh
- Division: Khulna
- District: Jhenaidah
- Upazila: Kaliganj

Area
  - Total: 36.26 km^{2} (14.00 sq mi)

Population (2011)
  - Total: 24,483
  - Density: 675.2/km^{2} (1,749/sq mi)
- Time zone: UTC+6 (BST)
- Website: barabazarup.jhenaidah.gov.bd

Baro Bazar Union (Bengali: বারবাজার ইউনিয়ন) is a union parishad of Kaliganj Upazila, in Jhenaidah District, Khulna Division of Bangladesh. The union has an area of 36.26 square kilometres (14.00 sq mi) and as of 2001 had a population of 24,483. There are 11 villages and 6 mouzas in the union.

== Mohammadabad ==
See also Mosque city of Mohammadabad

Mohammadabad, an ancient city established in the 14th century Bengal Sultanate period, is located within this union. Around 15 archaeological sites are discovered in this three square kilometer area.
