= Union councils of Jhenaidah District =

Union councils of Jhenaidah District (Bengali: ঝিনাইদহ জেলার ইউনিয়ন পরিষদসমূহ) are the smallest rural administrative and local government units in Jhenaidah District of Bangladesh. The district consists of 6 municipalities, 6 upazilas, 5 thana, 55 ward, 136 mahalla, 67 union porishods, mouza 945 and 1144 villages.

== Harinakunda Upazila ==
Harinakunda Upazila is divided into Harinakunda Municipality and eight union parishads. The union parishads are subdivided into 77 mauzas and 122 villages. Harinakunda Municipality is subdivided into 9 wards and 17 mahallas.

- Bhayna Union
- Chandpur Union
- Daulatpur Union
- Falsi Union
- Joradah Union
- Kapashatia Union
- Raghunathpur Union
- Taherhuda Union

== Jhenaidah Sadar Upazila ==
Jhenaidah Sadar Upazila is divided into Jhenaidah Municipality and 17 union parishads. The union parishads are subdivided into 268 mauzas and 284 villages. Jhenaidah Municipality is subdivided into 9 wards and 34 mahallas.

- Dogachi Union
- Fursondi Union
- Ganna Union
- Ghorshal Union
- Halidhani Union
- Harishongkorpur Union
- Kalicharanpur Union
- Kumrabaria Union
- Maharazpur Union
- Modhuhati Union
- Naldanga Union
- Padmakar Union
- Paglakanai Union
- Porahati Union
- Sadhuhati Union
- Saganna Union
- Surat Union

== Kaliganj Upazila ==
Kaliganj Upazila is divided into Kaliganj Municipality and 11 union parishads. The union parishads are subdivided into 188 mauzas and 198 villages. Kaliganj Municipality is subdivided into 9 wards and 20 mahallas.

- Baro Bazar Union
- Jamal Union
- Kashtabhanga Union
- Kola Union
- Maliat Union
- Niamatpur Union
- Raygram Union
- Rakhalgachi Union
- Shimla-Rokonpur Union
- Sundarpur-Durgapur Union
- Trilochanpur Union

== Kotchandpur Upazila ==
Kotchandpur Upazila is divided into Kotchandpur Municipality and five union parishads. The union parishads are subdivided into 81 mauzas and 79 villages. Kotchandpur Municipality is subdivided into 9 wards and 25 mahallas.

- Baluhar Union
- Dora Union
- Elangi Union
- Kushna Union
- Sabdalpur Union

== Maheshpur Upazila ==
Maheshpur Upazila is divided into Maheshpur Municipality and 12 union parishads. The union parishads are subdivided into 150 mauzas and 196 villages. Maheshpur Municipality is subdivided into 9 wards and 16 mahallas.

- Azampur Union
- Banshbaria Union
- Fatepur Union
- Jadabpur Union
- Kazirber Union
- Mandarbaria Union
- Natima Union
- Nepa Union
- S.B.K Union
- Panthapara Union
- Shyamkur Union
- Swaruppur Union

== Shailkupa Upazila ==
Shailkupa Upazila is divided into Shailkupa Municipality and 14 union parishads. The union parishads are subdivided into 181 mauzas and 264 villages. Shailkupa Municipality is subdivided into 9 wards and 24 mahallas.

- Abaipur Union
- Bogura Union
- Dignagore Union
- Dhaloharachandra Union
- Dudshar Union
- Fulhari Union
- Hakimpur Union
- Kancherkol Union
- Manoharpur Union
- Mirzapur Union
- Nityanandapur Union
- Sarutia Union
- Tribeni Union
- Umedpur Union
