= Bancorp (disambiguation) =

Bancorp is a word used in the names of bank holding companies which are not themselves licensed banks.

Instances of this usage, and other unrelated uses of Bancorp are:

== Companies ==
- 1st Constitution Bancorp
- Carver Bancorp
- Clifton Bancorp, Inc.
- Eagle Bancorp
- East West Bancorp
- First BanCorp
- First Bancorp
- First Midwest Bancorp
- Hudson City Bancorp
- U.S. Bancorp
- Zions Bancorporation

=== Former companies ===
- Citizens Republic Bancorp
- Commerce Bancorp
- First Interstate Bancorp
- First Maryland Bancorp
- Greater Community Bancorp
- Pacific Capital Bancorp
- Rainier Bancorp
- Summit Bancorp
- Superior Bancorp
- West Coast Bancorp

== Geographical locations ==
- US Bancorp Center
- U.S. Bancorp Tower
