= KSBK =

KSBK may refer to:

- KSBK (FM), a radio station (100.3 MHz) licensed to serve Alamosa, Colorado, United States
- KSBK-LD, a low-power television station (channel 11, virtual 28) licensed to serve Colorado Springs, Colorado
- KSBK (AM) (later JORO), a radio station in Naha, Okinawa, Japan
- KSBK (later ProFauna Indonesia), the local partner of International Primate Protection League
- Karl-Schiller Berufskolleg, a vocational school in Dortmund, Germany named for Karl Schiller

== See also ==
- SBK (disambiguation)
- WSBK (disambiguation)
- CSBK (disambiguation)
