= Adarsha Andulia =

Coordinates: 23.6751°N 89.0536°E

Adarsha Andulia (Bengali: আদর্শ আন্দুলিয়া) is a village in Harinakunda Upazila of Jhenaidah District. A khal (canal) flows through the village. The western part of the village consists of green paddy fields. There is a primary school and a high school. There is a mosque where people pray five times a day. On every Friday, they gather in the mosque for the 'Jumma Prayer' (weekly gathering of the Muslims).
