= Durgapur Union =

Durgapur Union may refer to:

- Durgapur Union, Kalihati, a union in Kalihati Upazila
- Durgapur Union (Mirsharai), a union in Mirsarai Upazila
- Goswami Durgapur Union, a union in Kusthia Sadar Upazila
- Sundarpur-Durgapur Union, a union in Kaliganj Upazila
