= Panthapara Union =

Panthapara Union পান্থপাড়া ইউনিয়ন
- Union
- Location within Bangladesh
- Coordinates: 23.3663°N 88.8544°E
- Country: Bangladesh
- Division: Khulna
- District: Jhenaidah
- Upazila: Maheshpur

Area
  - Total: 88.86 km^{2} (34.31 sq mi)

Population (2011)
  - Total: 19,315
  - Density: 217.4/km^{2} (563.0/sq mi)
- Time zone: UTC+6 (BST)
- Website: panthaparaup.jhenaidah.gov.bd

Panthapara Union (Bengali: পান্থপাড়া ইউনিয়ন) is a union parishad of Maheshpur Upazila, in Jhenaidah District, Khulna Division of Bangladesh. The union has an area of 88.86 square kilometres (34.31 sq mi) and as of 2001 had a population of 19,315. There are 12 villages and 13 mouzas in the union.
