= Natima Union =

Natima Union নাটিমা ইউনিয়ন
- Union
- Natima Union
- Country: Bangladesh
- Division: Khulna
- District: Jhenaidah
- Upazila: Maheshpur

Area
  - Total: 23.30 km^{2} (9.00 sq mi)

Population (2011)
  - Total: 20,069
  - Density: 861.3/km^{2} (2,231/sq mi)
- Time zone: UTC+6 (BST)
- Website: natimaup.jhenaidah.gov.bd

Natima Union (Bengali: নাটিমা ইউনিয়ন) is a union parishad situated at Maheshpur Upazila, in Jhenaidah District, Khulna Division of Bangladesh. The union has an area of 23.30 square kilometres (9.00 sq mi) and as of 2001 had a population of 20,069. There are 18 villages and 12 mouzas in the union.
