= Sabdalpur Union =

Sabdalpur Union সাবদালপুর ইউনিয়ন
- Union
- Sabdalpur Union
- Location within Bangladesh
- Coordinates: 23.4592°N 88.9587°E
- Country: Bangladesh
- Division: Khulna
- District: Jhenaidah
- Upazila: Kotchandpur

Area
  - Total: 69.05 km^{2} (26.66 sq mi)

Population (2011)
  - Total: 22,322
  - Density: 323.3/km^{2} (837.3/sq mi)
- Time zone: UTC+6 (BST)
- Website: sabdalpurup.jhenaidah.gov.bd

Sabdalpur Union (Bengali: সাবদালপুর ইউনিয়ন) is a union parishad of Kotchandpur Upazila, in Jhenaidah District, Khulna Division of Bangladesh. The union has an area of 69.05 square kilometres (26.66 sq mi) and as of 2001 had a population of 22,322. There are 16 villages and 13 mouzas in the union.
