= Azampur Union =

Azampur Union আজমপুর ইউনিয়ন
- Union
- Azampur Union
- Location within Bangladesh
- Coordinates: 23.3603°N 89.0023°E
- Country: Bangladesh
- Division: Khulna
- District: Jhenaidah
- Upazila: Maheshpur

Area
  - Total: 20.72 km^{2} (8.00 sq mi)

Population (2011)
  - Total: 19,847
  - Density: 957.9/km^{2} (2,481/sq mi)
- Time zone: UTC+6 (BST)
- Website: azampurup.jhenaidah.gov.bd

Azampur Union (Bengali: আজমপুর ইউনিয়ন) is a union parishad of Maheshpur Upazila, in Jhenaidah District, Khulna Division of Bangladesh. The union has an area of 20.72 square kilometres (8.00 sq mi) and as of 2001 had a population of 19,847. There are 19 villages and 14 mouzas in the union.
