= Elangi Union =

Elangi Union এলাঙ্গী ইউনিয়ন
- Union
- Elangi Union
- Location within Bangladesh
- Coordinates: 23.4015°N 89.0469°E
- Country: Bangladesh
- Division: Khulna
- District: Jhenaidah
- Upazila: Kotchandpur

Area
  - Total: 65.40 km^{2} (25.25 sq mi)

Population (2011)
  - Total: 18,998
  - Density: 290.5/km^{2} (752.4/sq mi)
- Time zone: UTC+6 (BST)
- Website: elangiup.jhenaidah.gov.bd

Elangi Union (Bengali: এলাঙ্গী ইউনিয়ন) is a union parishad of Kotchandpur Upazila, in Jhenaidah District, Khulna Division of Bangladesh. The union has an area of 65.40 square kilometres (25.25 sq mi) and as of 2001 had a population of 18,998. There are 15 villages and 15 mouzas in the union.
