= Nepa Union =

Nepa Union নেপা ইউনিয়ন
- Union
- Nepa Union
- Location within Bangladesh
- Coordinates: 23.2942°N 88.7530°E
- Country: Bangladesh
- Division: Khulna
- District: Jhenaidah
- Upazila: Maheshpur

Area
  - Total: 34.34 km^{2} (13.26 sq mi)

Population (2011)
  - Total: 21,913
  - Density: 638.1/km^{2} (1,653/sq mi)
- Time zone: UTC+6 (BST)
- Website: nepaup.jhenaidah.gov.bd

Nepa Union (Bengali: নেপা ইউনিয়ন) is a union parishad situated at Maheshpur Upazila, in Jhenaidah District, Khulna Division of Bangladesh. The union has an area of 34.34 square kilometres (13.26 sq mi) and as of 2001 had a population of 21,913. There are 16 villages and 13 mouzas in the union.
