= Baluhar Union =

Baluhar Union বলুহর ইউনিয়ন
- Union
- Baluhar Union
- Location within Bangladesh
- Coordinates: 23.4315°N 88.9895°E
- Country: Bangladesh
- Division: Khulna
- District: Jhenaidah
- Upazila: Kotchandpur

Area
  - Total: 69.96 km^{2} (27.01 sq mi)

Population (2011)
  - Total: 20,642
  - Density: 295.1/km^{2} (764.2/sq mi)
- Time zone: UTC+6 (BST)
- Website: baluharup.jhenaidah.gov.bd

Baluhar Union (Bengali: বলুহর ইউনিয়ন) is a union parishad of Kotchandpur Upazila, in Jhenaidah District, Khulna Division of Bangladesh. The union has an area of 69.96 square kilometres (27.01 sq mi) and as of 2001 had a population of 20,642. There are 11 villages and 11 mouzas in the union.
