= Shyamkur Union, Maheshpur =

Shyamkur Union শ্যামকুড় ইউনিয়ন
- Union
- Shyamkur Union
- Location within Bangladesh
- Coordinates: 23.3464°N 88.7865°E
- Country: Bangladesh
- Division: Khulna
- District: Jhenaidah
- Upazila: Maheshpur

Area
  - Total: 87.12 km^{2} (33.64 sq mi)

Population (2011)
  - Total: 19,793
  - Density: 227.2/km^{2} (588.4/sq mi)
- Time zone: UTC+6 (BST)
- Website: shyamkurup.jhenaidah.gov.bd

Shyamkur Union (Bengali: শ্যামকুড় ইউনিয়ন) is a union parishad of Maheshpur Upazila, in Jhenaidah District, Khulna Division of Bangladesh. The union has an area of 87.12 square kilometres (33.64 sq mi) and as of 2001 had a population of 19,793. There are 22 villages and 11 mouzas in the union.
