= Kazirber Union =

Kazirber Union কাজীরবেড় ইউনিয়ন
- Union
- Kazirber Union
- Location within Bangladesh
- Coordinates: 23.2473°N 88.7839°E
- Country: Bangladesh
- Division: Khulna
- District: Jhenaidah
- Upazila: Maheshpur

Area
  - Total: 91.87 km^{2} (35.47 sq mi)

Population (2011)
  - Total: 25,136
  - Density: 273.6/km^{2} (708.6/sq mi)
- Time zone: UTC+6 (BST)
- Website: kazirberup.jhenaidah.gov.bd

Kazirber Union (Bengali: কাজীরবেড় ইউনিয়ন) is a union parishad of Maheshpur Upazila, in Jhenaidah District, Khulna Division of Bangladesh. The union has an area of 91.87 square kilometres (35.47 sq mi) and as of 2001 had a population of 25,136. There are 28 villages and 12 mouzas in the union.
