= Goswami Durgapur Bahumukhi Secondary School =

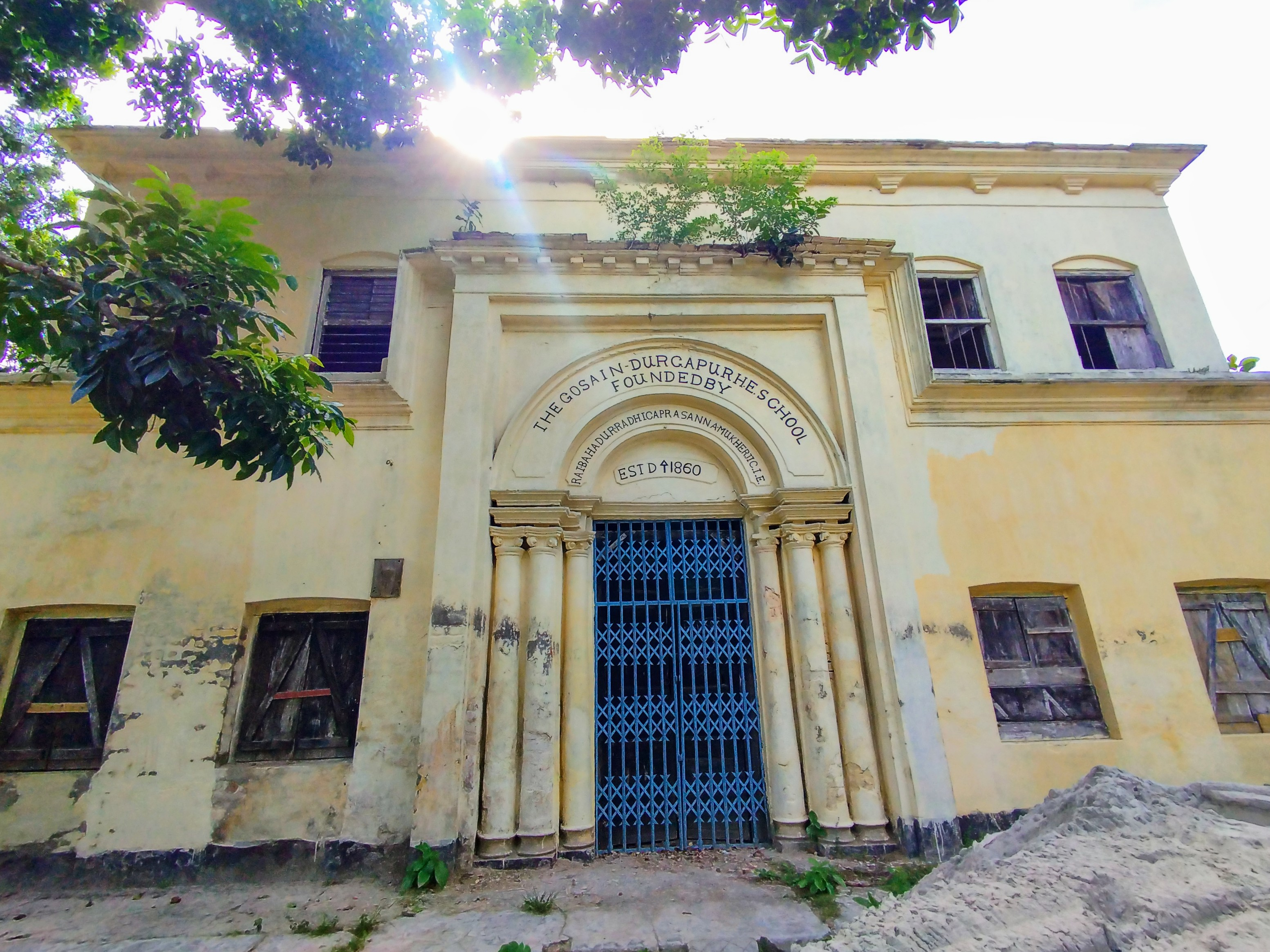
- Front of the old building

Location
- Goswami Durgapur, Goswami Durgapur Union, Kushtia Sadar Upazila; Bangladesh
- Coordinates: 23.7707002°N 89.0031191°E

Information
- Former names: Goswami Durgapur H.E. School; Goswami Durgapur Bahumukhi High School
- School type: MPO Secondary school
- Established: 1869; 157 years ago
- Founder: Rai Bahadur Radhika Prasanna Mukherjee
- School board: Board of Intermediate and Secondary Education, Jashore
- School district: Kushtia District
- School number: 117758 (EIIN)
- Teaching staff: 28
- Enrollment: 700
- Classes: 6th-10th
- Language: Bengali
- Campus type: Rural
- Website: goswamidurgapursecondaryschool.jessoreboard.gov.bd
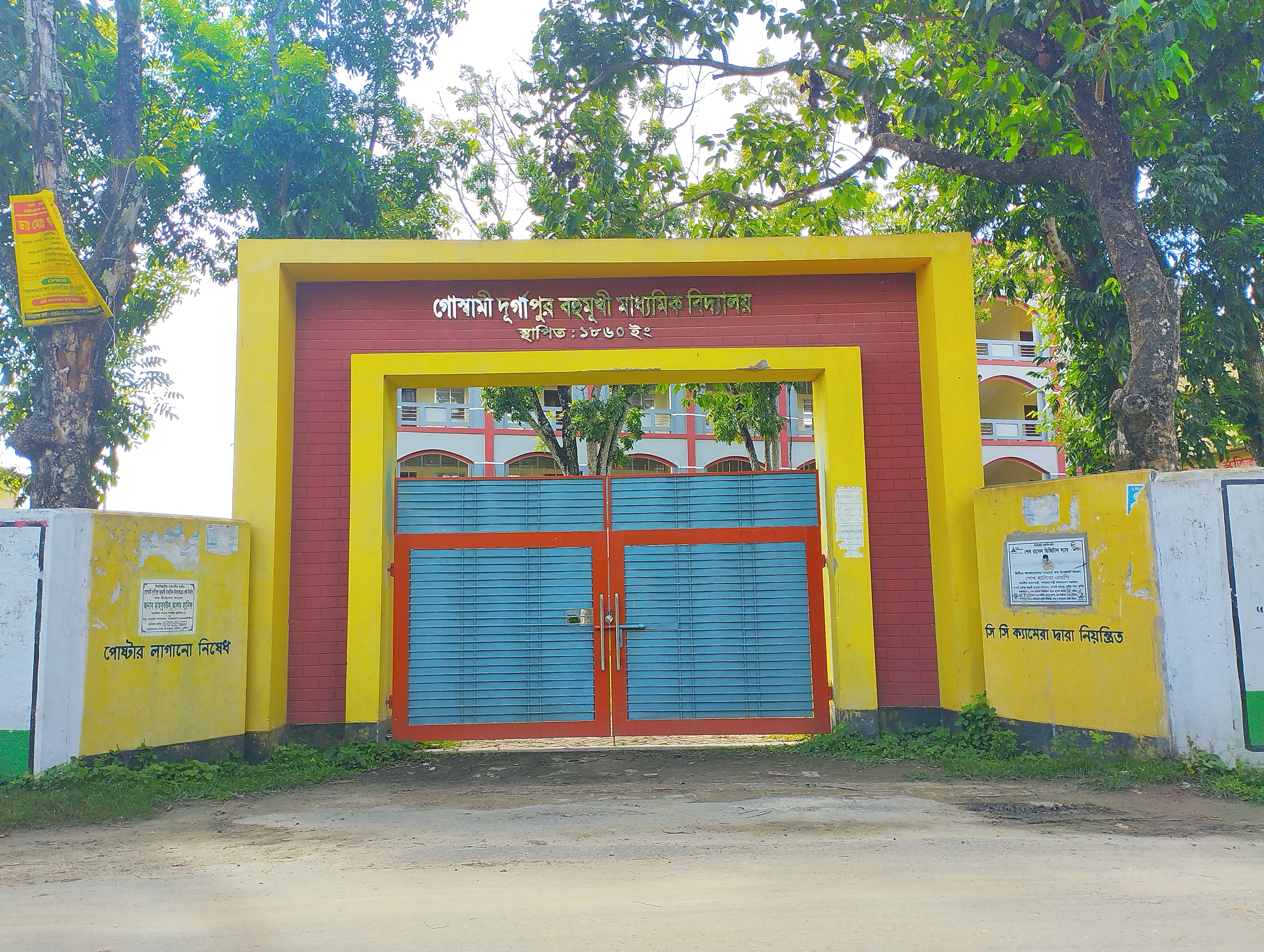
- The main gate of school

Goswami Durgapur Bahumukhi Secondary School (Bengali: গোস্বামী দুর্গাপুর বহুমুখী মাধ্যমিক বিদ্যালয়) is an old secondary school in Goswami Durgapur of Goswami Durgapur Union of Kushtia Sadar Upazila of Kushtia District . The school was established by the British in 1860.

== Educational activities ==
The school is running secondary class teaching program under Jessore Board.

== Bibliography ==
- Md. Rezaul Karim (December 2022). কুষ্টিয়ার প্রত্ননিদর্শন (in Bengali) (1st ed.). Banglabazar, Dhaka: গতিধারা [Gatidhara]. pp. 184–186. ISBN 978-984-8950-41-8.
