= Chandpur Union =

Chandpur Union may refer to

- Chandpur Union, Kumarkhali
- Chandpur Union, Harinakunda
- Chandpur Union, Raipura
