= Falsi Union =

Falsi Union ফলশী ইউনিয়ন
- Union
- Falsi Union
- Location within Bangladesh
- Coordinates: 23.6470°N 89.0750°E
- Country: Bangladesh
- Division: Khulna
- District: Jhenaidah
- Upazila: Harinakunda

Area
  - Total: 21.16 km^{2} (8.17 sq mi)

Population (2011)
  - Total: 13,000
  - Density: 610/km^{2} (1,600/sq mi)
- Time zone: UTC+6 (BST)
- Website: falsiup.jhenaidah.gov.bd

Falsi Union (Bengali: ফলশী ইউনিয়ন) is a union parishad of Harinakunda Upazila, in Jhenaidah District, Khulna Division of Bangladesh. The union has an area of 21.16 square kilometres (8.17 sq mi) and as of 2001 had a population of 13,000. There are 7 villages and 5 mouzas in the union.
