= Kushna Union =

Kushna Union কুশনা ইউনিয়ন
- Union
- Location within Bangladesh
- Coordinates: 23.4612°N 89.0129°E
- Country: Bangladesh
- Division: Khulna
- District: Jhenaidah
- Upazila: Kotchandpur

Area
  - Total: 81.35 km^{2} (31.41 sq mi)

Population (2011)
  - Total: 19,363
  - Density: 238.0/km^{2} (616.5/sq mi)
- Time zone: UTC+6 (BST)
- Website: kushnaup.jhenaidah.gov.bd

Kushna Union (Bengali: কুশনা ইউনিয়ন) is a union parishad situated at Kotchandpur Upazila, in Jhenaidah District, Khulna Division of Bangladesh. The union has an area of 81.35 square kilometres (31.41 sq mi) and as of 2001 had a population of 19,363. There are 17 villages and 19 mouzas in the union.
