= Banshbaria Union =

Banshbaria Union বাঁশবাড়ীয়া ইউনিয়ন
- Union
- Banshbaria Union
- Location within Bangladesh
- Coordinates: 23.2817°N 88.8180°E
- Country: Bangladesh
- Division: Khulna
- District: Jhenaidah
- Upazila: Maheshpur

Area
  - Total: 64.75 km^{2} (25.00 sq mi)

Population (2011)
  - Total: 22,001
  - Density: 339.8/km^{2} (880.0/sq mi)
- Time zone: UTC+6 (BST)
- Website: banshbariaup.jhenaidah.gov.bd

Banshbaria Union (Bengali: বাঁশবাড়ীয়া ইউনিয়ন) is a union parishad of Maheshpur Upazila, in Jhenaidah District, Khulna Division of Bangladesh. The union has an area of 64.75 square kilometres (25.00 sq mi) and as of 2001 had a population of 22,001. There are 19 villages and 14 mouzas in the union.
