= Joradah Union =

Union in Khulna

Joradah Union জোড়াদহ ইউনিয়ন
- Union
- Joradah Union
- Location within Bangladesh
- Coordinates: 23.7070°N 89.0735°E
- Country: Bangladesh
- Division: Khulna
- District: Jhenaidah
- Upazila: Harinakunda

Area
  - Total: 36.73 km^{2} (14.18 sq mi)

Population (2011)
  - Total: 10,728
  - Density: 292.1/km^{2} (756.5/sq mi)
- Time zone: UTC+6 (BST)
- Website: joradahup.jhenaidah.gov.bd

Joradah Union (Bengali: জোড়াদহ ইউনিয়ন) is a union parishad of Harinakunda Upazila, in Jhenaidah District, Khulna Division of Bangladesh. The union has an area of 36.73 square kilometres (14.18 sq mi) and as of 2001 had a population of 10,728. There are 6 villages and 4 mouzas in the union.
