= Taherhuda Union =

Taherhuda Union তাহেরহুদা ইউনিয়ন
- Union
- Taherhuda Union
- Country: Bangladesh
- Division: Khulna
- District: Jhenaidah
- Upazila: Harinakunda

Area
  - Total: 27.19 km^{2} (10.50 sq mi)

Population (2011)
  - Total: 19,720
  - Density: 725.3/km^{2} (1,878/sq mi)
- Time zone: UTC+6 (BST)
- Website: taherhudaup.jhenaidah.gov.bd

Taherhuda Union (Bengali: তাহেরহুদা ইউনিয়ন) is a union parishad situated at Harinakunda Upazila, in Jhenaidah District, Khulna Division of Bangladesh. The union has an area of 27.19 square kilometres (10.50 sq mi) and as of 2001 had a population of 19,720. There are 18 villages and 18 Dj_elgato. all villages names are Adarsha Andulia, Tarehuda, Bhabanipur, Sreepur, Dhulia, Narayankandi, Gopinathpur, Pultadanga etc.
