= Bhayna Union =

Bhayna Union ভায়না ইউনিয়ন
- Union
- Bhayna Union
- Country: Bangladesh
- Division: Khulna
- District: Jhenaidah
- Upazila: Harinakunda

Area
  - Total: 38.07 km^{2} (14.70 sq mi)

Population (2011)
  - Total: 25,813
  - Density: 678.0/km^{2} (1,756/sq mi)
- Time zone: UTC+6 (BST)
- Website: bhaynaup.jhenaidah.gov.bd

Bhayna Union (Bengali: ভায়না ইউনিয়ন) is a union parishad situated at Harinakunda Upazila, in Jhenaidah District, Khulna Division of Bangladesh. The union has an area of 38.07 square kilometres (14.70 sq mi) and as of 2001 had a population of 25,813. There are 11 villages and 6 mouzas in the union.
