= Government K. M. H. College =

Academic institution in Jhenaidah, Bangladesh

Govt. K.M.H. College
- সরকারি কে,এম,এইচ, কলেজ
- Motto: Knowledge is power
- Type: Public
- Established: 16 July 1969; 57 years ago
- Affiliations: National University
- Principal: Professor Anutosh Kumar
- Academic staff: 36+
- Administrative staff: 26+
- Students: 3187+
- Location: Jhenaidah, Bangladesh; 23.4149°N 89.0196°E
- Campus: Urban
- Website: kmhc.gov.bd

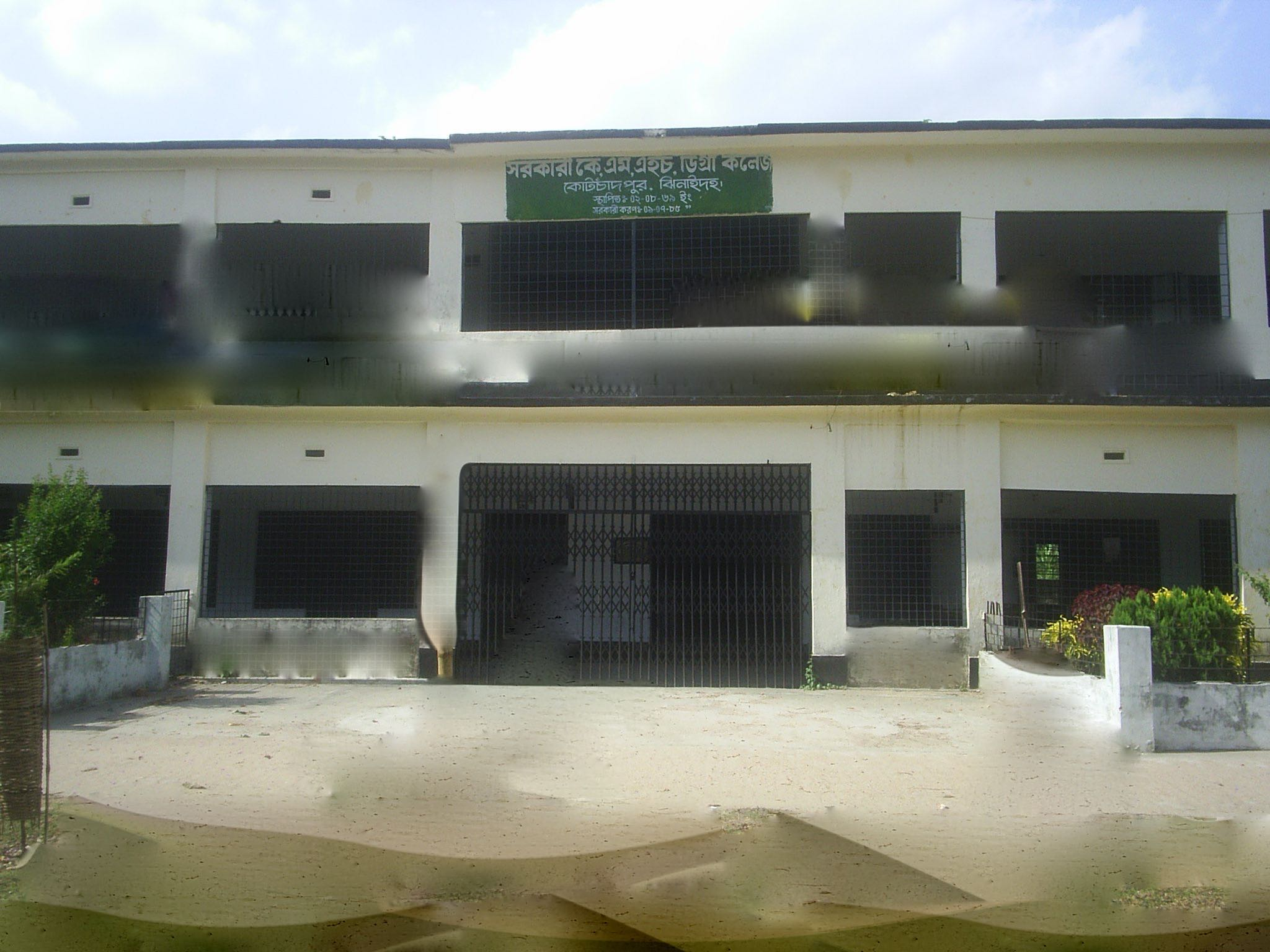
Govt. K.M.H. College Building

Govt. K.M.H. College (Bengali: সরকারি কে,এম,এইচ, কলেজ) is a pass-level degree college located in Kotchandpur Upazila of Jhenaidah District, Bangladesh. It was founded in 1969, and nationalized in 1985. The college is situated by college stand road, Jhenaidah. There are two buildings, one is Science building and another one is Main building.

== History ==
The college was established on 18 July 1969 and on 2 August with the approval of Jessore Board. First the old high school premises i.e. the present women's degree college and later the assembly hall of the present high school. Mr. Rafiuddin Sardar, Haji Maqbool Hossain, Nur Mohammad Sardar and Masudunnabi Chowdhury alias Pannu Mia, Shamsur Rahman, Asaduzzaman Katu Mia and some other enthusiastic workers have worked hard and sacrificed a lot for the establishment of the college. Local businessman Mr. Khandaker Mosharraf Hossain contributed a lot for the college. That is why the college was named after him as ‘Khondakar Mosharraf Hossain College’ and at the present place the college was shifted along the railway line in the south east corner of Kotchandpur railway station and is being run in its own college building on 8 acres of land. The first principal was Mr. SM Tajul Islam and Mr. Abdul Matleb was the principal from 1970 to 1994 and Mr. Abdul Matleb's contribution to the progress of the college was immense. In 1965, the college got approval from Rajshahi University at the undergraduate level. In 1983, the then Municipal Chairman Mr. MA Wadud Hula Mia requested His Excellency the President General Hussain Mohammad Ershad to make the college official and later the college was made official. At present the college has started honors course.

== Educational activities ==
At present there are higher education activities and honors courses. The pass rate in the college is 8.11 percent.

=== Honors course ===
- Bengali
- History
- Political Science
- Economy
- Accounting
- Management

== Current student and infrastructure ==
At present the number of students in the college is about 316 students. The total land area of the college is 06 acres. Government Khandaker Mosharraf Hossain College has a two-storied building on the north side with office room, library, common room and humanities and commerce branch. And in the two-storey building on the west side of the college, all science classes and examinations are taken, including the science laboratory and computer lab. A one-storey mosque to the southwest of the college grounds. Spacious playground in front of the two buildings of the college. To the east of the college there is an open space for hostel construction and a ladder barrier pond has been dug.

== Number of current teachers and staff ==
At present the number of teachers in the college is about 36. And the number of office officers is 26.

== Collaboration ==
BNCC
