= Government Birshestha Shahid Hamidur Rahman Degree College =

- Motto: এসো জ্ঞানের সন্ধানে ফিরে যাও দেশের কল্যাণে
- Type: Government college
- Established: 1 December 1999, nationalized 2013
- Principal: Md. Rafi Uddin
- Location: Khalishpur Bazar, Khulna Division, 8340, Bangladesh; 23.3922°N 88.9396°E
- Campus: rural
- Website: www.gbshrdc.edu.bd

Government Birshestha Shahid Hamidur Rahman Degree College is an educational institution in Jhenaidah district in the Khulna Division of Bangladesh. The college currently offers courses in a variety of subjects in higher secondary, undergraduate, honors, and postgraduate classes.

== History ==
The college was established on 1 December 1999 at Khalishpur Bazar in Maheshpur Upazila of Jhenaidah district, Khulna division of Bangladesh. The college was made government in 2013. There is Bir Shrestha Hamidur Rahman Library and Memorial Museum. In 2006, the government built the Hamidur Rahman Library and Memorial Museum in Khalishpur. The Kopotaksh River flows past the college. There are 36 bighas of khas land on the river bank and in front of the college. There is a factory here which is known as Nilkuthi. There are big mango trees of 100 years around the house. Here was a place to park a car and spend the afternoon. These were built in the eighteenth century.

== Educational activities ==
At present higher education activities are also running. Honors course was introduced from 2016 to 2017 academic year.

Faculty of Social Sciences:

- Political Science

Faculty of Arts:

- Bengali

Faculty of Business Education:

- Management
