= Kotchandpur Govt. Model Pilot Secondary School =

Kotchandpur Government Model Pilot Secondary School
- কোটচাঁদপুর সরকারি মডেল পাইলট মাধ্যমিক বিদ্যালয়

Location
- Kotchandpur Upazila; Jhenaidah, 7330; Bangladesh; 23.4046°N 89.0106°E

Information
- Type: Public
- Established: 1899
- Headmaster: Md. Mofizur Rahman
- Teaching staff: 16
- Grades: 6–10
- Gender: Co-educational
- Age range: 10-17
- Enrollment: Approx. 1,500
- Language: Bengali
- Hours in school day: 6 hours
- Campus: Suburban
- Campus size: 11.78 acre
- Colors: White and Navy blue
- Sports: Football, Cricket, Volleyball, Badminton, Handball
- Accreditation: Board of Intermediate and Secondary Education, Jessore
- Alumni: KExPA
- Website: kmpss.edu.bd

Kotchandpur Government Model Pilot Secondary School (Bengali: কোটচাঁদপুর সরকারি মডেল পাইলট মাধ্যমিক বিদ্যালয়) is a secondary school located in Kotchandpur Upazila. It is one of the oldest secondary schools of Bangladesh and the most renowned school of Kotchandpur Upazila.

== History ==
The school was first established as a primary school and later turned into a secondary school in 1889. Later in 1899, the school was named Kotchandpur English High School at the initiative of Edward George MacLeod, Mr. B. Allen, Mr. JJ Platel and Mr. Masudul Haq. After shifting it to the house of Clive MacLeod, (later owned By Gostha Behari Das and Usha Rani Das), the school was named Kotchandpur High School. Later, it was again renamed Kotchandpur Pilot High School. After nationalization in 2018, the school took the shape of Kotchandpur Government Model Pilot Secondary School.

== Campus ==
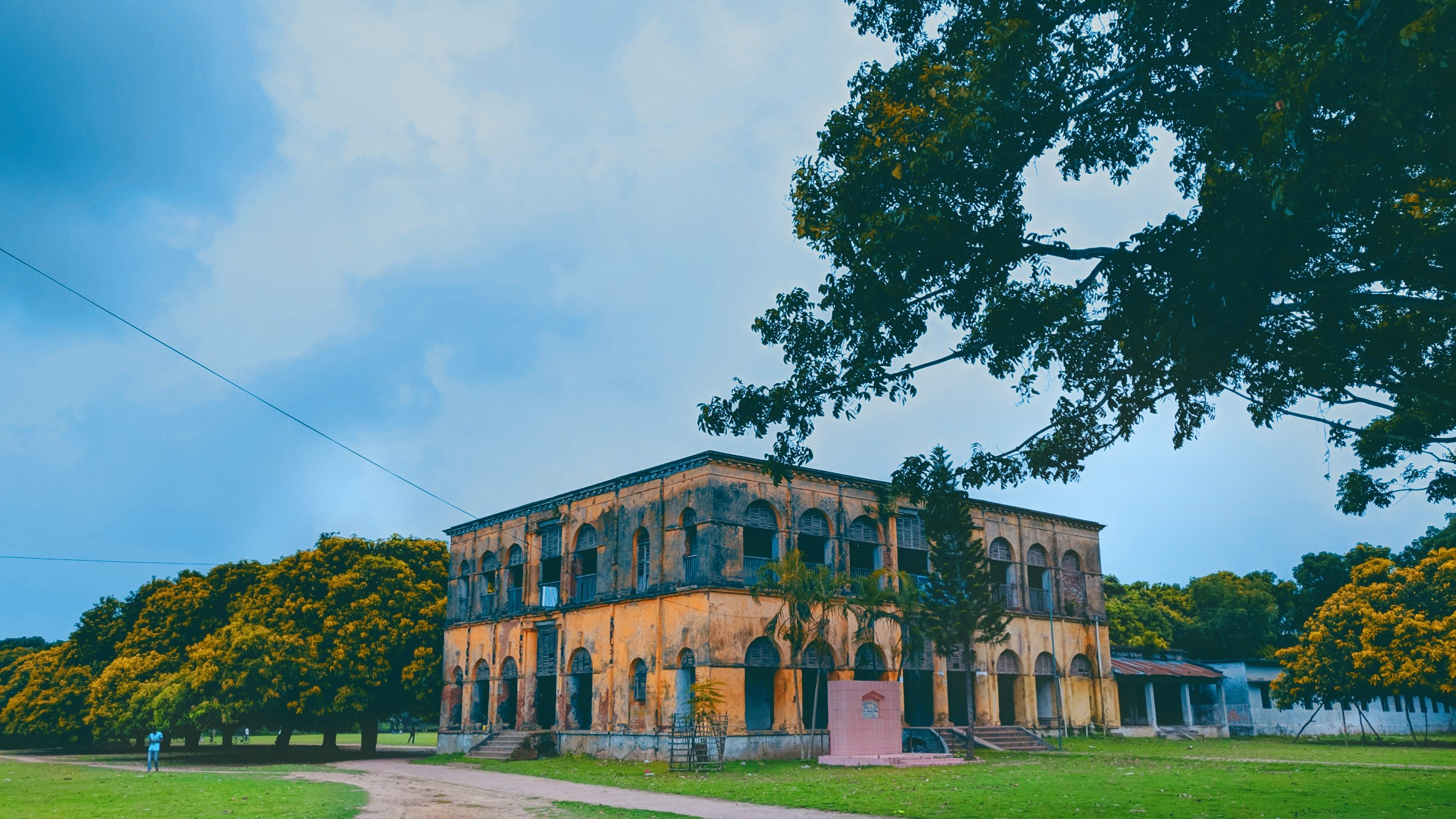
Front View of Main Building

The school has a 11.78-acre campus with a large playground and a lot of trees. It is situated beside the Kapotaksha River. It has 3 two-storied buildings, 4 one-storied buildings(2 abandoned), 1 mosque and 16 rooms for educational purposes.

== Curriculum ==
Kotchandpur Government Model Pilot Secondary School provides education to its students in the Secondary level in Bengali medium under the national curriculum. The school is affiliated with Jashore Education Board. This is a combined school, both boys and girls can admit here. There is no admission process for admitting into the school(Removed during the Lockdown during Covid-19 pandemic). Students are selected via lottery. The school offers its education in Bengali language. As of 2026, the school has approximately 1500 students and 16 teachers.
