= Kapashatia Union =

Kapashatia Union কাপাশহাটিয়া ইউনিয়ন
- Union
- Kapashatia Union
- Location within Bangladesh
- Coordinates: 23.6065°N 89.0719°E
- Country: Bangladesh
- Division: Khulna
- District: Jhenaidah
- Upazila: Harinakunda

Area
  - Total: 82.91 km^{2} (32.01 sq mi)

Population (2011)
  - Total: 35,400
  - Density: 427/km^{2} (1,110/sq mi)
- Time zone: UTC+6 (BST)
- Website: kapashatiaup.jhenaidah.gov.bd

Kapashatia Union (Bengali: কাপাশহাটিয়া ইউনিয়ন) is a union parishad of Harinakunda Upazila, in Jhenaidah District, Khulna Division of Bangladesh. The union has an area of 82.91 square kilometres (32.01 sq mi) and as of 2001 had a population of 35,400. There are 21 villages and 10 mouzas in the union.
