= Mandarbaria Union =

Mandarbaria Union মান্দারবাড়ীয়া ইউনিয়ন
- Union
- Mandarbaria Union
- Country: Bangladesh
- Division: Khulna
- District: Jhenaidah
- Upazila: Maheshpur

Area
  - Total: 101.01 km^{2} (39.00 sq mi)

Population (2011)
  - Total: 17,606
  - Density: 174.30/km^{2} (451.43/sq mi)
- Time zone: UTC+6 (BST)
- Website: manderbariaup.jhenaidah.gov.bd

Mandarbaria Union (Bengali: মান্দারবাড়ীয়া ইউনিয়ন) is a union parishad situated at Maheshpur Upazila, in Jhenaidah District, Khulna Division of Bangladesh. The union has an area of 101.01 square kilometres (39.00 sq mi) and as of 2001 had a population of 19,847. There are 22 villages and 18 mouzas in the union.
