= Raghunathpur Union =

Raghunathpur Union may refer to:

- Raghunathpur Union, Dumuria, a union in Dumuria Upazila
- Raghunathpur Union, Harinakunda, a union in Harinakunda Upazila
