= Dora Union =

Dora Union দোড়া ইউনিয়ন
- Union
- Dora Union
- Location within Bangladesh
- Coordinates: 23.4878°N 88.9882°E
- Country: Bangladesh
- Division: Khulna
- District: Jhenaidah
- Upazila: Kotchandpur

Area
  - Total: 95.93 km^{2} (37.04 sq mi)

Population (2011)
  - Total: 21,158
  - Density: 220.6/km^{2} (571.2/sq mi)
- Time zone: UTC+6 (BST)
- Website: doraup.jhenaidah.gov.bd

Dora Union (Bengali: দোড়া ইউনিয়ন) is a union parishad of Kotchandpur Upazila, in Jhenaidah District, Khulna Division of Bangladesh. The union has an area of 95.93 square kilometres (37.04 sq mi) and as of 2001 had a population of 21,158. There are 18 villages and 16 mouzas in the union.
