= Fatepur Union, Maheshpur =

Fatepur Union ফতেপুর ইউনিয়ন
- Union
- Fatepur Union
- Location within Bangladesh
- Country: Bangladesh
- Division: Khulna
- District: Jhenaidah
- Upazila: Maheshpur

Area
  - Total: 30.00 km^{2} (11.58 sq mi)

Population (2011)
  - Total: 32,137
  - Density: 1,071/km^{2} (2,774/sq mi)
- Time zone: UTC+6 (BST)
- Website: fatepurup.jhenaidah.gov.bd

Fatepur Union (Bengali: ফতেপুর ইউনিয়ন) is a union parishad situated at Maheshpur Upazila, in Jhenaidah District, Khulna Division of Bangladesh. The union has an area of 30.00 square kilometres (11.58 sq mi) and as of 2001 had a population of 32,137. There are 13 villages and 8 mouzas in the union.
