= Swaruppur Union =

Swaruppur Union স্বরুপপুর ইউনিয়ন
- Union
- Swaruppur Union
- Location within Bangladesh
- Coordinates: 23.3708°N 88.8048°E
- Country: Bangladesh
- Division: Khulna
- District: Jhenaidah
- Upazila: Maheshpur

Area
  - Total: 25.99 km^{2} (10.03 sq mi)

Population (2011)
  - Total: 16,421
  - Density: 631.8/km^{2} (1,636/sq mi)
- Time zone: UTC+6 (BST)
- Website: swaruppurup.jhenaidah.gov.bd

Swaruppur Union (Bengali: স্বরুপপুর ইউনিয়ন) is a union parishad of Maheshpur Upazila, in Jhenaidah District, Khulna Division of Bangladesh. The union has an area of 25.90 square kilometres (10.00 sq mi) and as of 2001 had a population of 16,421. There are 13 villages and 13 mouzas in the union.
