= Jadabpur Union, Maheshpur =

Jadabpur Union যাদবপুর ইউনিয়ন
- Union
- Azampur Union
- Location within Bangladesh
- Coordinates: 23.2515°N 88.8790°E
- Country: Bangladesh
- Division: Khulna
- District: Jhenaidah
- Upazila: Maheshpur

Area
  - Total: 39.19 km^{2} (15.13 sq mi)

Population (2011)
  - Total: 21,648
  - Density: 552.4/km^{2} (1,431/sq mi)
- Time zone: UTC+6 (BST)
- Website: jadabpurup.jhenaidah.gov.bd

Jadabpur Union (Bengali: যাদবপুর ইউনিয়ন) is a union parishad of Maheshpur Upazila, in Jhenaidah District, Khulna Division of Bangladesh. The union has an area of 39.19 square kilometres (15.13 sq mi) and as of 2001 had a population of 21,648. There are 14 villages and 12 mouzas in the union.
