= Daulatpur Union, Harinakunda =

Daulatpur Union ভায়না ইউনিয়ন
- Union
- Daulatpur Union
- Location within Bangladesh
- Coordinates: 23.6177°N 89.0214°E
- Country: Bangladesh
- Division: Khulna
- District: Jhenaidah
- Upazila: Harinakunda

Area
  - Total: 18.13 km^{2} (7.00 sq mi)

Population (2011)
  - Total: 30,244
  - Density: 1,668/km^{2} (4,321/sq mi)
- Time zone: UTC+6 (BST)
- Website: daulatpurup.jhenaidah.gov.bd

Daulatpur Union (Bengali: ভায়না ইউনিয়ন) is a union parishad of Harinakunda Upazila, in Jhenaidah District, Khulna Division of Bangladesh. The union has an area of 18.13 square kilometres (7.00 sq mi) and as of 2001 had a population of 30,244. There are 18 villages and 8 mouzas in the union.
