= Niamatpur Union, Kaliganj =

Niamatpur Union নিয়ামতপুর ইউনিয়ন
- Union
- Niamatpur Union
- Location within Bangladesh
- Coordinates: 23.3838°N 89.1595°E
- Country: Bangladesh
- Division: Khulna
- District: Jhenaidah
- Upazila: Kaliganj

Area
  - Total: 63.23 km^{2} (24.41 sq mi)

Population (2011)
  - Total: 14,662
  - Density: 231.9/km^{2} (600.6/sq mi)
- Time zone: UTC+6 (BST)
- Website: niamatpurup.jhenaidah.gov.bd

Niamatpur Union (Bengali: নিয়ামতপুর ইউনিয়ন) is a union parishad situated at Kaliganj Upazila, in Jhenaidah District, Khulna Division of Bangladesh. The union has an area of 63.23 square kilometres (24.41 sq mi) and as of 2001 had a population of 14,662. There are 14 villages and 10 mouzas in the union.
