= Abul Hasan Jashori =

Bangladeshi Islamic scholar (1918–1993)

Mawlana Abul Hasan Jashori

Personal life
- Born: 1918 Bhabanipur, Jhenaidah subdivision, Jessore District, Bengal Province
- Died: 8 July 1993 (aged 74–75) Jessore, Bangladesh
- Resting place: Jessore Rail Station Madrasah cemetery
- Parent: Janab Ali Bishwas (father)
- Education: Darul Uloom Deoband

Religious life
- Religion: Islam
- Denomination: Sunni
- Jurisprudence: Hanafi
- Tariqa: Chishti (Sabiri-Imdadi); Naqshbandi; Qadri; Suhrawardy
- Movement: Deobandi

Muslim leader
- Teacher: Hussain Ahmad Madani; Ibrahim Balyawi; Izaz Ali Amrohi; Muhammad Shafi
- Disciple of: Hussain Ahmad Madani; Azizul Haq

Vice-President, Jamiat Ulema-e-Islam
- In office 1967 – 8 July 1993

Principal of Jamia Ezazia Darul Uloom Jessore
- In office 1959 – 8 July 1993
- Succeeded by: Anwarul Karim Jashori

Personal details
- Party: All-India Muslim League; Jamiat Ulema-e-Islam (1945–1993)

Abul Hasan Jashori (Bengali: আবুল হাসান যশোরী; 1918 – 8 July 1993) (Note: Also spelt as Abul Hasan Jessori.) was a Bangladeshi Islamic scholar, politician, author, teacher and freedom fighter. He was the founding principal and Shaykh al-Hadith of the Jamia Ezazia Darul Uloom Jessore institution.

== Early life and education ==
Abul Hasan was born in 1918, to a Bengali Muslim family in the village of Bhabanipur in Harinakunda, Jhenaidah, then located under the Jessore District of the Bengal Province. His father's name was Janab Ali Bishwas. His early education began at the local village primary school, before joining the Magura High School where he completed his matriculation and enrolled at the Magura College. In 1937, he moved to Delhi to obtain further Islamic studies at the Fatehpur Madrasah and Madrasah-e-Rahmatiyyah. After spending six years in Delhi, he was then admitted to Darul Uloom Deoband where he studied under the likes of Hussain Ahmad Madani, Ibrahim Bailyavi, Izaz Ali Amrohi and Muhammad Shafi and specialised in Hadith studies. He was also a murid of Madani, and then Azizul Haq after the partition.

== Career ==
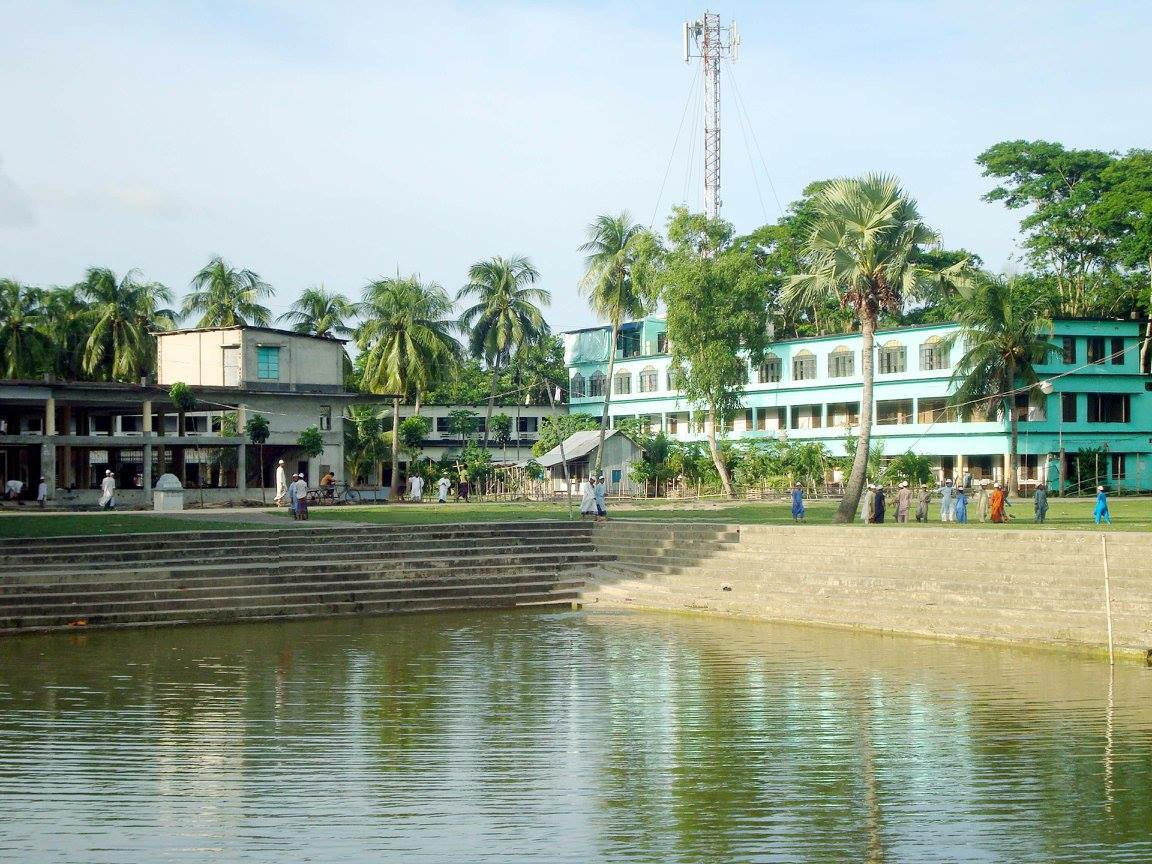
Gawhardanga Madrasa in Tungipara where Jashori served as Shaykh al-Hadith.

He returned to Bengal after completing his studies, and was appointed in 1948 as the Shaykh al-Hadith (Professor of Hadith studies) of the Jamia Islamia Darul Uloom Khademul Islam madrasa of Shamsul Haque Faridpuri in Gawhardanga. In 1959, philanthropist Chowdhury Altaf Husayn donated some land for the establishment of a madrasa in Jessore with the assistance of Mawla Faruq, son of Habibullah Qurayshi. Abul Hasan was appointed as this madrasa's first principal and Shaykh al-Hadith, and was committed to this role until his death. The madrasa was named Jamia Ezazia Darul Uloom Jessore after his teacher Izaz Ali Amrohi. Taking Jessore as his residence, it was from then on that Abul Hasan became known as Abul Hasan Jashori.

In politics, Jashori was initially aligned with the All-India Muslim League. However, he joined the Jamiat Ulema-e-Islam when it was founded in 1945. In 1967, he was appointed as the vice-president of the party and remained so until his death. During the Bangladesh Liberation War, he gave public speeches to motivate people to support the cause. Jashori also provided refuge to Bengali freedom fighters and Hindu civilians at his madrasa in Jessore.

1n 1975, Jashori founded the Ehsania Madrasah in Narail. He also founded the Shamsul Uloom Madrasah in Lakshmipasha in 1982, and the Zakariyya Madrasah in Senhati, Khulna in 1980.

== Works ==
Jashori has written several works pertaining to Islam. Some of these include:

1. রাসূল (স.)-এর সুষ্টির সাক্ষ্য, Rasool (S.)-er Shushtir Shakkho
2. কাদিয়ানীদের মোকাবেলায় চ্যালেঞ্জ, Qadiyanider Moqabelay Challenge
3. মুসলমানদের শেষ রাত, Musolmander Shesh Raat

== Death and legacy ==
Jashori died after Fajr prayers on 8 July 1993 in Jessore. He was buried in the graveyard of the Darul Uloom Jessore madrasa.

== See more ==
- List of Deobandis
