= Raygram Union =

Raygram Union রায়গ্রাম ইউনিয়ন
- Union
- Raygram Union
- Location within Bangladesh
- Coordinates: 23.3815°N 89.1574°E
- Country: Bangladesh
- Division: Khulna
- District: Jhenaidah
- Upazila: Kaliganj

Area
  - Total: 73.04 km^{2} (28.20 sq mi)

Population (2011)
  - Total: 20,246
  - Density: 277.2/km^{2} (717.9/sq mi)
- Time zone: UTC+6 (BST)
- Website: raygramup.jhenaidah.gov.bd

Raygram Union (Bengali: রায়গ্রাম ইউনিয়ন) is a union parishad situated at Kaliganj Upazila, in Jhenaidah District, Khulna Division of Bangladesh. The union has an area of 73.04 square kilometres (28.20 sq mi) and as of 2001 had a population of 20,246. There are 21 villages and 17 mouzas in the union.
