= Kola Union, Kaliganj =

Kola Union কোলা ইউনিয়ন
- Union
- Kola Union
- Location within Bangladesh
- Coordinates: 23.3981°N 89.2158°E
- Country: Bangladesh
- Division: Khulna
- District: Jhenaidah
- Upazila: Kaliganj

Area
  - Total: 73.27 km^{2} (28.29 sq mi)

Population (2011)
  - Total: 18,662
  - Density: 254.7/km^{2} (659.7/sq mi)
- Time zone: UTC+6 (BST)
- Website: kolaup.jhenaidah.gov.bd

Kola Union (Bengali: কোলা ইউনিয়ন) is a union parishad of Kaliganj Upazila, in Jhenaidah District, Khulna Division of Bangladesh. The union has an area of 73.27 square kilometres (28.29 sq mi) and as of 2001 had a population of 18,662. There are 22 villages and 22 mouzas in the union.
