= Shimla-Rokonpur Union =

Shimla-Rokonpur Union শিমলা-রোকনপুর ইউনিয়ন
- Union
- Shimla-Rokonpur Union
- Location within Bangladesh
- Coordinates: 23.3937°N 89.1132°E
- Country: Bangladesh
- Division: Khulna
- District: Jhenaidah
- Upazila: Kaliganj

Area
  - Total: 54.13 km^{2} (20.90 sq mi)

Population (2011)
  - Total: 13,377
  - Density: 247.1/km^{2} (640.1/sq mi)
- Time zone: UTC+6 (BST)
- Website: simlarokonpurup.jhenaidah.gov.bd

Shimla-Rokonpur Union (Bengali: শিমলা-রোকনপুর ইউনিয়ন) is a union parishad of Kaliganj Upazila, in Jhenaidah District, Khulna Division of Bangladesh. The union has an area of 54.13 square kilometres (20.90 sq mi) and as of 2001 had a population of 13,377. There are 10 villages and 9 mouzas in the union.
