= Jamal Union =

Jamal Union জামাল ইউনিয়ন
- Union
- Jamal Union
- Location within Bangladesh
- Coordinates: 23.4088°N 89.2177°E
- Country: Bangladesh
- Division: Khulna
- District: Jhenaidah
- Upazila: Kaliganj

Area
  - Total: 32.89 km^{2} (12.70 sq mi)

Population (2011)
  - Total: 17,422
  - Density: 529.7/km^{2} (1,372/sq mi)
- Time zone: UTC+6 (BST)
- Website: jamalup.jhenaidah.gov.bd

Jamal Union (Bengali: জামাল ইউনিয়ন) is a union parishad of Kaliganj Upazila, in Jhenaidah District, Khulna Division of Bangladesh. The union has an area of 32.89 square kilometres (12.70 sq mi) and as of 2001 had a population of 17,422. There are 20 villages and 18 mouzas in the union.
