= Kashtabhanga Union =

Kashtabhanga Union কাষ্টভাঙ্গা ইউনিয়ন
- Union
- Kashtabhanga Union
- Country: Bangladesh
- Division: Khulna
- District: Jhenaidah
- Upazila: Kaliganj

Area
  - Total: 15.93 km^{2} (6.15 sq mi)

Population (2011)
  - Total: 16,494
  - Density: 1,035/km^{2} (2,682/sq mi)
- Time zone: UTC+6 (BST)
- Website: kashtabhangaup.jhenaidah.gov.bd

Kashtabhanga Union (Bengali: কাষ্টভাঙ্গা ইউনিয়ন) is a union parishad situated at Kaliganj Upazila, in Jhenaidah District, Khulna Division of Bangladesh. The union has an area of 15.93 square kilometres (6.15 sq mi) and as of 2001 had a population of 16,494. There are 17 villages and 14 mouzas in the union.
