= Raghunathpur Union, Harinakunda =

Raghunathpur Union রঘুনাথপুর ইউনিয়ন
- Union
- Raghunathpur Union
- Location within Bangladesh
- Coordinates: 22.8671°N 89.4039°E
- Country: Bangladesh
- Division: Khulna
- District: Jhenaidah
- Upazila: Harinakunda

Area
  - Total: 60.27 km^{2} (23.27 sq mi)

Population (2011)
  - Total: 25,818
  - Density: 428.4/km^{2} (1,109/sq mi)
- Time zone: UTC+6 (BST)
- Website: raghunathpurup.jhenaidah.gov.bd

Raghunathpur Union (Bengali: রঘুনাথপুর ইউনিয়ন) is a union parishad of Harinakunda Upazila, in Jhenaidah District, Khulna Division of Bangladesh. The union has an area of 60.27 square kilometres (23.27 sq mi) and as of 2001 had a population of 25,818. There are 21 villages and 6 mouzas in the union.
