= SBK =

SBK may refer to:

== Places ==
- Saint-Brieuc–Armor Airport (IATA airport code SBK), Saint-Brieuc, Côtes-d'Armor, Brittany, France
- Societe des Bauxites de Kindia, Guinea; a rail line and company
- South Brooklyn Railway (reporting mark SBK), Brooklyn, New York City, New York State, USA
- Kajang line, Klang Valley, Malaysia; a metro line
- S.B.K Union, Maheshpur Upazila, Jhenaidah District, Khulna Division, Bangladesh; a rural council

== People and characters ==
- Soul Brother Kevin, host of the Orlando, Florida, USA radio show SBK Live

=== Fictional characters ===
- Silver Bells Killer, a fictional character from the TV show American Gothic

== Sports ==
- superbike racing, a form of motorcycle racing
  - Superbike World Championship (SBK, WSBK)
- Svenska Kendoförbundet (SB&K), national kendo federation of Sweden, recognized internationally as the representative for Sweden by the International Kendo Federation

== Groups, organizations ==
- SBK Records (Swid, Bandier, Koppelman), former US record label
- ShoreBank insolvent US community development bank acquired by the Urban Partnership Bank
- Standard Bank (stock ticker SBK), a South African bank

=== Fictional organizations ===
- South Bronx Killas, a fictional gang from the TV show Elementary

== Other uses ==
- Safwa language (ISO 649 language code sbk), a Bantu language of the Safwa people
- SBK: Snowboard Kids, 2005 video game for the Nintendo DS
- Triclopyr herbicide, sold under the brand name SBK Brushwood Killer in UK
