= Chandpur Union, Harinakunda =

Chandpur Union চাঁদপুর ইউনিয়ন
- Union
- Bhayna Union
- Location within Bangladesh
- Coordinates: 23.5958°N 89.1455°E
- Country: Bangladesh
- Division: Khulna
- District: Jhenaidah
- Upazila: Harinakunda

Area
  - Total: 74.85 km^{2} (28.90 sq mi)

Population (2011)
  - Total: 27,547
  - Density: 368.0/km^{2} (953.2/sq mi)
- Time zone: UTC+6 (BST)
- Website: chandpurup.jhenaidah.gov.bd

Chandpur Union (Bengali: চাঁদপুর ইউনিয়ন) is a union parishad of Harinakunda Upazila, in Jhenaidah District, Khulna Division of Bangladesh. The union has an area of 74.85 square kilometres (28.90 sq mi) and as of 2001 had a population of 27,547. There are 29 villages and 9 mouzas in the union.
