= S.B.K Union =

S.B.K Union এস.বি.কে ইউনিয়ন
- Union
- S.B.K Union
- Location within Bangladesh
- Coordinates: 23.3873°N 88.9442°E
- Country: Bangladesh
- Division: Khulna
- District: Jhenaidah
- Upazila: Maheshpur

Area
  - Total: 59.57 km^{2} (23.00 sq mi)

Population (2011)
  - Total: 22,322
  - Density: 374.7/km^{2} (970.5/sq mi)
- Time zone: UTC+6 (BST)
- Website: sbkup.jhenaidah.gov.bd

S.B.K Union (Bengali: এস.বি.কে ইউনিয়ন) is a union parishad of Maheshpur Upazila, in Jhenaidah District, Khulna Division of Bangladesh. The union has an area of 59.57 square kilometres (23.00 sq mi) and as of 2001 had a population of 22,322. There are 19 villages and 14 mouzas in the union.
