= CSBK =

CSBK may refer to:

- China Superbike Championship, a motorcycle racing championship
- Canadian Superbike Championship, a motorcycle racing championship
- Clifton Savings Bancorp of Clifton, New Jersey, USA; a retail savings bank
