= Rakhalgachi Union =

Rakhalgachi Union রাখালগাছি ইউনিয়ন
- Union
- Rakhalgachi Union
- Location within Bangladesh
- Coordinates: 23.3453°N 89.1019°E
- Country: Bangladesh
- Division: Khulna
- District: Jhenaidah
- Upazila: Kaliganj

Area
  - Total: 86.19 km^{2} (33.28 sq mi)

Population (2011)
  - Total: 21,768
  - Density: 252.6/km^{2} (654.1/sq mi)
- Time zone: UTC+6 (BST)
- Website: rakhalgachhiup.jhenaidah.gov.bd

Rakhalgachi Union (Bengali: রাখালগাছি ইউনিয়ন) is a union parishad of Kaliganj Upazila, in Jhenaidah District, Khulna Division of Bangladesh. The union has an area of 86.19 square kilometres (33.28 sq mi) and as of 2001 had a population of 21,768. There are 19 villages and 17 mouzas in the union.
