= Maliat Union =

Maliat Union মালিয়াট ইউনিয়ন
- Union
- Maliat Union
- Location within Bangladesh
- Coordinates: 23.3361°N 89.2084°E
- Country: Bangladesh
- Division: Khulna
- District: Jhenaidah
- Upazila: Kaliganj

Area
  - Total: 32.37 km^{2} (12.50 sq mi)

Population (2011)
  - Total: 17,680
  - Density: 546.2/km^{2} (1,415/sq mi)
- Time zone: UTC+6 (BST)
- Website: maliatup.jhenaidah.gov.bd

Maliat Union (Bengali: মালিয়াট ইউনিয়ন) is a union parishad of Kaliganj Upazila, in Jhenaidah District, Khulna Division of Bangladesh. The union has an area of 32.37 square kilometres (12.50 sq mi) and as of 2001 had a population of 17,680. There are 15 villages and 12 mouzas in the union.
