= First Maryland Bancorp =

American bank holding company

- Industry: Banking
- Founded: 1806; 220 years ago as Mechanics Bank of Baltimore
- Defunct: 2003; 23 years ago
- Total assets: $18.3 billion (2001)
- Number of employees: 6,000

First Maryland Bancorp was a bank holding company that operated the First National Bank of Maryland. The company changed its name to Allfirst Financial in 1999 and was acquired by M&T Bank in 2003.

The company operated 250 branches and more than 575 automated teller machines in Maryland, Pennsylvania, Washington D.C., Northern Virginia, and Delaware.

== History ==
The bank was founded in 1806 as Mechanics Bank of Baltimore.

In 1864, it established First National Bank of Maryland.

In 1983, Allied Irish Banks made an investment in the company.

In 1988, Allied Irish Banks acquired the portion of the company that it did not already own.

In 1997, the company acquired Dauphin Deposit Corporation for $1.36 billion.

In 1999, the company changed its name to Allfirst Financial.

In 2003, M&T Bank acquired the company.
