= 1st Constitution Bancorp =

- Company type: Public
- Traded as: Nasdaq: FCCY; Russell 2000 Index component
- Industry: Banking
- Founded: 1989; 37 years ago
- Defunct: January 2022
- Fate: Acquired by Lakeland Bancorp, Inc.
- Headquarters: Cranbury, New Jersey
- Key people: Charles S. Crow, III (chairman); Robert F. Mangano (CEO & president); John Andreacio (CCO & EVP); Stephen J. Gilhooly (CFO & SVP)
- Total assets: ▲$1.079 billion (2017)
- Total equity: ▲$0.111 billion (2017)
- Number of employees: 183 (2017)
- Website: www.1stconstitution.com

1st Constitution Bancorp was a bank holding company based in Cranbury, New Jersey that operated 1st Constitution Bank until its acquisition by Lakeland Bancorp, Inc.

== History ==
1st Constitution Bank was founded in 1989.

In 1999, 1st Constitution Bancorp was established as a bank holding company.

In October 2010, the company repaid the $12 million that it received from the Troubled Asset Relief Program.

In 2013, the company acquired Rumson-Fair Haven Bank and Trust for $24.3 million.

In June 2016, the company expanded the size of its board of directors from 5 to 8 members.

In 2017, the company acquired New Jersey Community Bank for $7.6 million.

In June 2019, the company announced its intent to acquire Shore Community Bank in a deal valued at $53.1 million. The deal was approved and closed in November 2019.

In January 2022, Lakeland Bancorp acquired 1st Constitution Bancorp in an all-stock deal.
