= Sundarpur-Durgapur Union =

Sundarpur-Durgapur Union সুন্দরপুর-দূর্গাপুর ইউনিয়ন
- Union
- Jamal Union
- Location within Bangladesh
- Coordinates: 23.4471°N 89.1210°E
- Country: Bangladesh
- Division: Khulna
- District: Jhenaidah
- Upazila: Kaliganj

Area
  - Total: 38.89 km^{2} (15.02 sq mi)

Population (2011)
  - Total: 17,907
  - Density: 460.5/km^{2} (1,193/sq mi)
- Time zone: UTC+6 (BST)
- Website: sundarpurdurgapurup.jhenaidah.gov.bd

Sundarpur-Durgapur Union (Bengali: সুন্দরপুর-দূর্গাপুর ইউনিয়ন) is a union parishad of Kaliganj Upazila, in Jhenaidah District, Khulna Division of Bangladesh. The union has an area of 38.89 square kilometres (15.02 sq mi) and as of 2001 had a population of 17,907. There are 16 villages and 13 mouzas in the union.
