= Jhenaidah =

City and District headquarter of Jhenaidah District

Jhenaidah ঝিনাইদহ
- City & Municipality
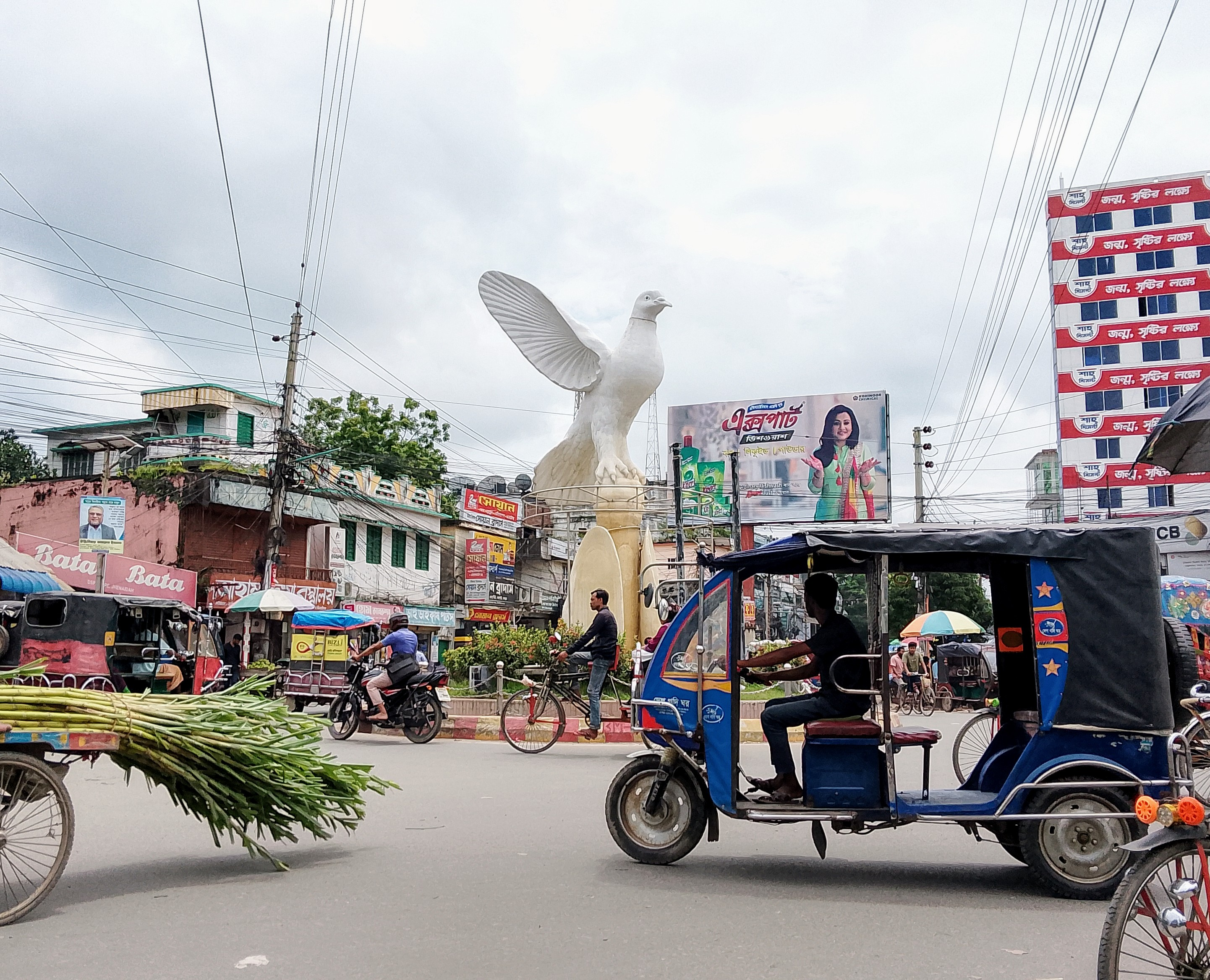
- Paira Chattar Jhenaidah

- Location in Bangladesh Jhenaidah (Bangladesh)
- Coordinates: 23.541668°N 89.183334°E
- Country: Bangladesh
- Division: Khulna
- District: Jhenaidah
- Upazila: Jhenaidah Sadar

Government
  - Type: Mayor–Council
  - Body: Jhenaidah Municipality

Area
  - Total: 32.42 km^{2} (12.52 sq mi)

Population
  - Total: 140,271
  - Density: 4,327/km^{2} (11,210/sq mi)
  - Rank: 19th
- Time zone: UTC+6 (Bangladesh Time)
- Postal code: 7300
- National Dialing Code: +880

Jhenaidah (Bengali: ঝিনাইদহ) is a city in the Khulna Division of south-western Bangladesh. Jhenaidah is the headquarters of Jhenaidah Sadar Upazila and Jhenaidah District. The city has a population of about 140,000, making it the 34th largest city in Bangladesh. It is the fourth largest city in the Khulna Division, after Khulna, Kushtia, and Jessore.

== Etymology ==
This area was once very popular for trading oysters. In the past, people of this area used to collect a huge quantity of oysters from the river bed Nabaganga and the adjacent khaals and beels. It is believed that the name of the aea might have derived from Jhinuk. In the middle ages, the mint town of Muhammadabad, named after Sultan of Bengal Jalaluddin Muhammad Shah, was situated in Kaliganj, Jhenaidah.

== History ==
Jhenaidah, the largest city of Jhenaidah District, likely came into existence in the middle of the 18th century. Previously, it was a part of Greater Kushtia, itself once a part of Greater Nadia.

== Demographics ==
Religions in Jhenaidah Paurashava (2022)
Religion	Percent
Muslims	88.63%
Hindus	11.32%
Other or not stated	0.05%

According to the 2022 Bangladesh census, Jhenaidah Paurashava had 35,712 households and a population of 140,271. Jhenaidah had a literacy rate of 85.67%: 87.94% for males and 83.34% for females, and a sex ratio of 102.60 males per 100 females. 7.98% of the population was under 5 years of age.

According to the 2011 Bangladesh census, Jhenaidah city had 25,286 households and a population of 107,834. 18,813 (17.45%) were under 10 years of age. Jhenaidah had a literacy rate (age 7 and over) of 68.09%, compared to the national average of 51.8%, and a sex ratio of 959 females per 1000 males.

== Administration ==
Jhenaidah Municipality mahallah geocode map

The city consists of a paurashava which is further divided into 9 wards and 34 Mahalla Wards & included mahallas are

Ward no.	Mahallas
1	Bhutiargati, Khudropara, Gobindopur, Pabohati, Udaypur
2	Kalikapur, Shatbaria, Municipal office area, Mahila college area, North Hamdah
3	Chhoto kamarkundu, Dari gobindopur, Shikarpur, South Hamdah
4	Hamdah, Kanchanpur
5	Beparypara
6	Jhenaidah, Kalabagan, North Kanchannagar, South Kanchannagar
7	South khordo jhenaidah, Bergram, Lokkhikhol, Mothurapur, Mahishakundu
8	North kordha jhenaidah, Arappur, Khajura
9	Muraridah, Char Muraridah, East arappur.

== Transport ==
Jhenaidah is the road transport hub of its district. It is on the Daulatdia–Mongla Highway (N7). The stretch that runs east to Magura, about 27 kilometres (17 mi) away, was the second deadliest in Bangladesh as of 2004. The length that runs south to Jessore, about 45 kilometres (28 mi) away, is the busiest segment of the highway. To the west it is connected by regional highway R745 to Chuadanga, 36 kilometres (22 mi) away. National highway N704 splits off the N7 north to Kushtia, 47 kilometres (29 mi) distant.

== Education ==
The literacy rate (age 7 years and above) is 67.2%. Jhenaidah is known as important educational city of Khulna division. Educational institutions of Jhenaidah city are

- Jhenaidah Cadet College (Almost every year, it becomes first in Jessore board)
- Government K.C. College Jhenaidah
- Jhenaidah Government High School
- Jhenaidah Government Girls High School
- Kanchannagar Model High School and College
- Shaheen Cadet School, Jhenaidah
- Institute of Health and Technology
- Jhenaidah Polytechnical Institute
- Agricultural Training Institute, Jhenaidah

Aside from these, there are Jhenaidah Government Veterinary College, Jhenaidah Textile Engineering College, and Islamic University Bangladesh outside Jhenaidah municipality.
