= Faculty of Veterinary Medicine, Jashore University of Science and Technology =

Coordinates: 23.5567°N 89.0916°E

- ভেটেরিনারি মেডিসিন অনুষদ, যশোর বিজ্ঞান ও প্রযুক্তি বিশ্ববিদ্যালয়
- Former name: Jhenaidah Government Veterinary College (JGVC)
- Motto: শিক্ষা,দক্ষতা, নেতৃত্ব (Bengali)
- Motto in English: Education, Skill, Lead
- Type: Public University
- Established: 2010
- Parent institution: Jashore University of Science and Technology
- Chancellor: Mirza Fakhrul Islam Alamgir, Honorable President of Bangladesh
- Dean: Md. Ziaul Amin
- Location: Jhenidah, Bangladesh
- Campus: 10 acres (4.0 ha); Urban
- Nickname: JGVC
- Website: www.just.edu.bd/faculties/fvm/about

Faculty of Veterinary Medicine, Jashore University of Science and Technology (previously known as Jhenaidah Government Veterinary College) is the 9th veterinary institution in Bangladesh. It provides Veterinary Science and Animal Husbandry (VSAH) degree of 5 years that includes a 4 year long academic and 1 year internship. It was established at 2010. Currently the campus known as Jashore University of Science and Technology - Jhenaidah Campus.

== History ==
Liaquit Ali is the founder principal of the college. Jhenidah Govt Veterinary College, is an institution which is administered by the Department of Livestock Services (DLS) of Government of People Republic of Bangladesh and affiliated with Jessore University Of Science and Technology that is a specialised college where only the course of Doctor of Veterinary Medicine (that is a 5-year course) is being taught. JGVC is about 10 kilometres (6.2 mi) far from the main city of Jhenidah Zilla and situated on 10 acre land (100 acre occupied) beside the Jhenidah-Chuadanga main road.

== Academic ==
Every year, only 60 students able to get chance in the Jessore University of Science and Technology in DVM course after passing admission test.

== Campus ==
In JGVC, there are facilities such as halls for male and female students, mosque, auditorium, gymnasium, veterinary teaching hospital, medical center, rainwater plant for collecting rainwater safely, pond, playground, large-animal shed, lab-animal shed, guest house, medicinal garden, academic building, 14 laboratories, a modern 3rd generation central laboratory for biotechnological-genetical and vaccine thesis, and many other criteria.
