= WSBK =

WSBK may refer to:

- WSBK-TV, a television station (channel 21, virtual 38) licensed to Boston, Massachusetts, United States
- Superbike World Championship
