= Clifton Bancorp, Inc. =

American retail savings bank

Clifton Bancorp, Inc., d/b/a Clifton Savings Bank (abbreviated CSBK) and formerly known as Clifton Savings Bancorp, was a publicly traded American retail savings bank headquartered in Clifton, New Jersey, United States. The bank's base of operations was northern New Jersey with the majority of its branches operating out of its hometown.

== History ==
Clifton Savings Bancorp was founded as Botany Building and Loan Association in 1928 in Clifton's Botany Village section of town. The bank became known as East Clifton Building and Loan two years later and assumed the name Clifton Savings and Loan Association in 1954, all while remaining in the Botany section of Clifton; the bank served as the company's headquarters until 1998.

The bank's first branch office was opened in the Richfield section of Clifton in 1954, is located on the portion of Clifton Avenue designated NJ 161, and was the first to offer a drive-up window for banking. Fourteen years later Clifton Savings added a third branch in Clifton's Athenia section, in a storefront located on Van Houten Avenue. Two more branches opened in 1970 and 1971, on Lakeview Avenue and Valley Road in the Lakeview and Albion sections of town.

In 1975, Clifton Savings expanded their operations to outside of their base, opening a branch on Palisade Avenue in neighboring Garfield. Two years later, a second Garfield branch opened on Lanza Avenue.

In 1981, Clifton Savings opened two new locations. Both were located on Van Houten Avenue; one was a replacement for the old Athenia storefront branch and the other was a large branch in the Maple Valley section of the city which served as both a bank and the headquarters for Clifton Savings' mortgage lending department (which the bank has since moved to a separate office space in the Allwood section of Clifton). In 1998, during a massive remodeling, the Maple Valley branch became the bank's base of operations, as well as becoming the first branch to install an automated teller machine; an ATM has since been installed at all but three branches. The Maple Valley branch was also the last new, non-replacement branch to be built for over twenty years.

In 1989, Clifton Savings changed its name from Clifton Savings and Loan Association to Clifton Savings Bank, SLA.

Clifton Savings opened six new branches in the 2000s. Of the six, three were built to replace existing banks; those locations were in the Athenia section of Clifton and Garfield (as both of the bank's branches were replaced). The other three branches were located in Wallington, Wayne, and Fair Lawn, New Jersey; the former two branches opened in 2003 and the latter in 2009. Clifton Savings later opened in Lyndhurst, New Jersey, at the site of a former TD Banknorth branch, and in Woodland Park, New Jersey, at the site of a former Capital One Bank branch. Both of these branches were opened in 2010. Also in 2010, Clifton Savings' Botany branch, after operating for eighty-two years in the neighborhood at three different locations, was shut down by the bank and its accounts were transferred to the Lakeview branch.

In 2015, Clifton Savings announced it would be expanding to Hudson County and opening a branch in Hoboken. The bank also announced it would be shutting down its Albion branch and moving its accounts to the Maple Valley headquarters branch which the bank is now referring to as Montclair Heights. In 2016, Clifton Savings rebranded itself as CSBK and opened a branch in Montclair, New Jersey.

As of March 4, 2017, the Woodland Park branch closed, leaving the bank with twelve branches.

== Going public ==
In 2004, as part of a reorganization, Clifton Savings Bank was reincorporated as a federal mutual holding company and took its current name. Later that year, using the ticker symbol CSBK, the company became a publicly traded company on the NASDAQ stock market. The bank became a federal savings bank in 2007.

== Merger ==
On April 2, 2018, CSBK and Fairfield, New Jersey–based Kearny Bank announced the two banks had merged. The twelve CSBK branches were rebranded as Kearny Bank beginning in the fall of 2018 and the expansion brought Kearny's total branch count to fifty-four.

Since the merger, Kearny has closed all of the remaining Clifton branches it acquired save for the Richfield branch and the former headquarters branch. It has also closed one of the two Garfield branches and the Montclair branch, as well as building a replacement for the Wallington branch.
