= Goswami Durgapur Union =

Goswami Durgapur Union গোস্বামী দুর্গাপুর ইউনিয়ন
- Union
- Ailchara Union
- Country: Bangladesh
- Division: Khulna
- District: Kushtia
- Upazila: Kushtia Sadar

Area
  - Total: 62.81 km^{2} (24.25 sq mi)

Population (2011)
  - Total: 15,900
  - Density: 253/km^{2} (656/sq mi)
- Time zone: UTC+6 (BST)
- Website: 14nogoswamidurgapurup.kushtia.gov.bd

Goswami Durgapur Union (Bengali: গোস্বামী দুর্গাপুর ইউনিয়ন) is a union parishad situated at Kushtia Sadar Upazila, in Kushtia District, Khulna Division of Bangladesh. The union has an area of 62.81 square kilometres (24.25 sq mi) and as of 2001 had a population of 15,900. There are 11 villages and 2 mouzas in the union.
