= Kotchandpur Upazila =

Kotchandpur কোটচাঁদপুর
- Upazila
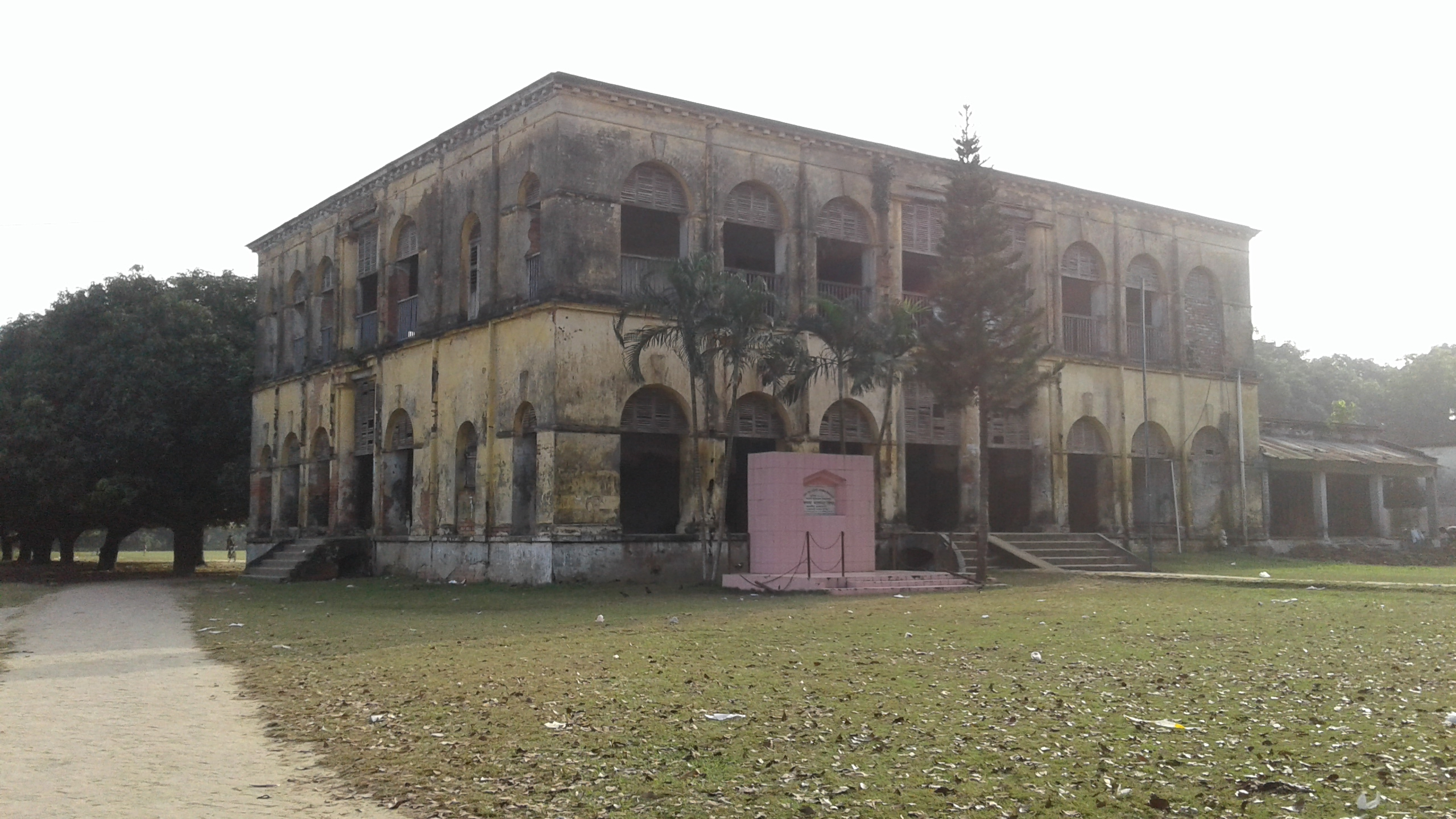
- British-raj era building in Kotchandpur

- Coordinates: 23°24′N 89°1′E
- Country: Bangladesh
- Division: Khulna
- District: Jhenaidah

Area
  - Total: 165.63 km^{2} (63.95 sq mi)

Population (2022)
  - Total: 156,545
  - Density: 945.15/km^{2} (2,447.9/sq mi)
- Time zone: UTC+6 (BST)
- Postal code: 7330
- Website: Official Map of Kotchandpur

Kotchandpur Upazila mauza geocode map

Kotchandpur (Bengali: কোটচাঁদপুর) is an upazila of Jhenaidah District in Khulna Division, in south-west Bangladesh.

== Geography ==
Kotchandpur is located at 23.4000°N 89.0167°E. It has a total area of 165.63 km^{2}. It is under Jhenaidah district. Kotchandpur is surrounded by three upzilla, in the east Kaliganj, in the south-west Moheshpur and in the north Jhenaidah Sadar. There are two rivers cross Kotchandpur. One is the Kopothakho River (also called Kobadak, Kabadak, and Kapotaksma), which crosses the town and another is the Chitra, which forms the northern border of Kotchandpur. This town is very close to India. Once it was famous for sugar. It is also famous for Boluhor Fish Project.

== Demographics ==
Historical population
Year	Pop. (000)	±%
1981	92	—
1991	112	+21.7%
2001	133	+18.8%
2011	141	+6.0%
2022	156	+10.6%
Source: Bangladesh Bureau of Statistics

Religions in Kotchandpur Upazila (2022)
Religion	Percent
Islam	90.38%
Hinduism	9.60%
Other or not stated	0.02%

According to the 2022 Bangladeshi census, Kotchandpur Upazila had 40,830 households and a population of 156,545. 8.41% of the population were under 5 years of age. Kotchandpur had a literacy rate (age 7 and over) of 74.81%: 76.91% for males and 72.79% for females, and a sex ratio of 97.22 males for every 100 females. 47,364 (30.26%) lived in urban areas.

As of the 2011 Census of Bangladesh, Kotchandpur upazila had 34,249 households and a population of 141,121. 27,796 (19.70%) were under 10 years of age. Kotchandpur had an average literacy rate of 50.4%, compared to the national average of 51.8%, and a sex ratio of 999 females per 1000 males. 33,094 (23.45%) of the population lived in urban areas.

== Administration ==
Kotchandpur Upazila is divided into Kotchandpur Municipality and five union parishads: Baluhar, Dora, Elangi, Kushna, and Sabdalpur. The union parishads are subdivided into 81 mauzas and 79 villages.

Kotchandpur Municipality is subdivided into 9 wards and 25 mahallas.

=== Politics ===
Municipality mayor: Md. Zahidul Islam (ZIRA) is the current mayor of the municipality (Pourasava). He was elected in 2016 and serving his third term.

Upazila chairman: Md. Tazul Islam. He was in politics for 20 years, under the banner of the opposition party Bangladesh Jamaat-e-Islami (2014–present).

Upazila vice chairman: Md. Muabia Hossain. He was in politics for 25 years, under the banner of the opposition party Bangladesh Jamaat-e-Islami (2014–present).

Upazila Mohila vice chairman: Mst. Nazma Khatun. She was in politics for 10 years, under the banner of the opposition party Bangladesh Jamaat-e-Islami (2014–present).

Member of the Parliament (MP): Shafiqul Azam Khan

== Education ==
There are six colleges in the upazila. They include Government K. M. H. College, founded in 1969, Kotchandpur Poura Mohila College, G. T. College Talsar, and S. D. Degree College.

The madrasa education system includes one kamil madrasa.
