= Harinakunda Upazila =

Harinakundu হরিণাকুন্ডু
- Upazila
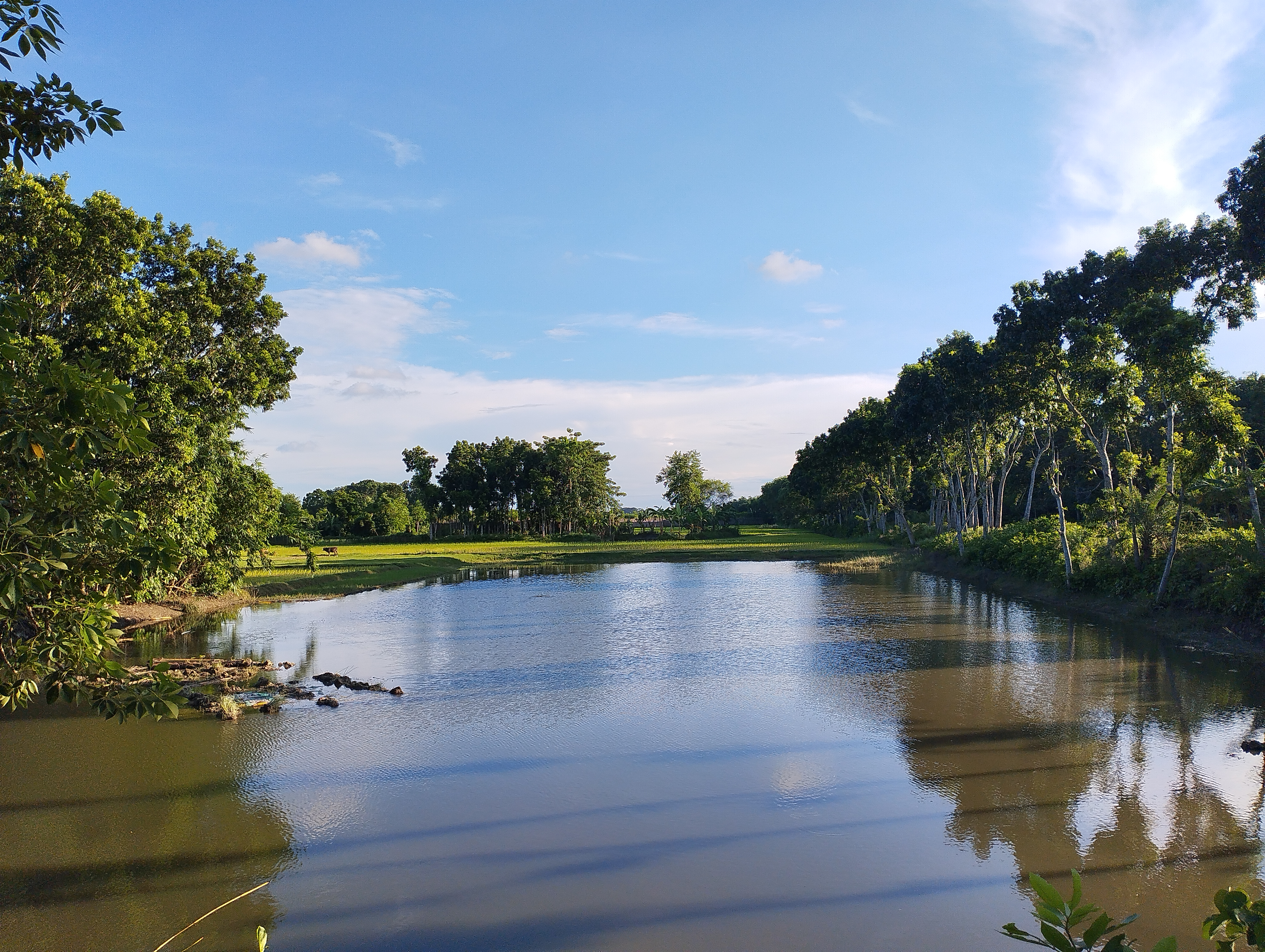
- A pond in Harinakunda upazila

- Coordinates: 23.6568°N 89.0424°E
- Country: Bangladesh
- Division: Khulna
- District: Jhenaidah

Area
  - Total: 227.54 km^{2} (87.85 sq mi)

Population (2022)
  - Total: 218,857
  - Density: 961.84/km^{2} (2,491.2/sq mi)
- Time zone: UTC+6 (BST)
- Postal code: 7310
- Area code: 0451
- Website: Official Map of Harinakunda

Harinakunda Upazila mauza geocode map

Harinakundu (Bengali: হরিণাকুন্ডু) is an upazila of Jhenaidah District in the Division of Khulna, Bangladesh.

== Geography ==
Harinakunda is located at 23.6568°N 89.0424°E. It has a total area of 227.54 km^{2}.

== Demographics ==
Religions in Harinakunda Upazila (2022)
Religion	Percent
Islam	96.04%
Hinduism	3.94%
Other or not stated	0.02%

According to the 2022 Bangladeshi census, Harinakunda Upazila had 57,027 households and a population of 218,857. 8.30% of the population were under 5 years of age. Harinakunda had a literacy rate (age 7 and over) of 68.33%: 69.67% for males and 67.02% for females, and a sex ratio of 99.11 males for every 100 females. 43,656 (19.95%) lived in urban areas.

As of the 2011 Census of Bangladesh, Harinakunda upazila had 48,209 households and a population of 197,723. 39,771 (20.11%) were under 10 years of age. Harinakunda had an average literacy rate of 42.31%, compared to the national average of 51.8%, and a sex ratio of 991 females per 1000 males. 28,274 (14.30%) of the population lived in urban areas.

As of the 1991 Bangladesh census, Harinakunda has a population of 162,078. Males constitute 51.57% of the population, and females 48.43%. This Upazila's eighteen up population is 79,363. Harinakunda has an average literacy rate of 20.8% (7+ years), and the national average of 32.4% literate.

== Administration ==
Harinakunda Upazila is divided into 1 municipality (Harinakunda) and eight union parishads namely: Bhayna, Chandpur, Daulatpur, Falsi, Joradah, Kapashatia, Raghunathpur, and Taherhuda. The union parishads are subdivided into 77 mauzas and 122 villages.

Harinakunda Municipality is subdivided into 9 wards and 17 mahallas.

== Notable people ==
- Abul Hasan Jashori, Islamic scholar and freedom fighter

== See also ==
- Upazilas of Bangladesh
- Districts of Bangladesh
- Divisions of Bangladesh
