= Maheshpur Upazila =

Maheshpur মহেশপুর
- Upazila
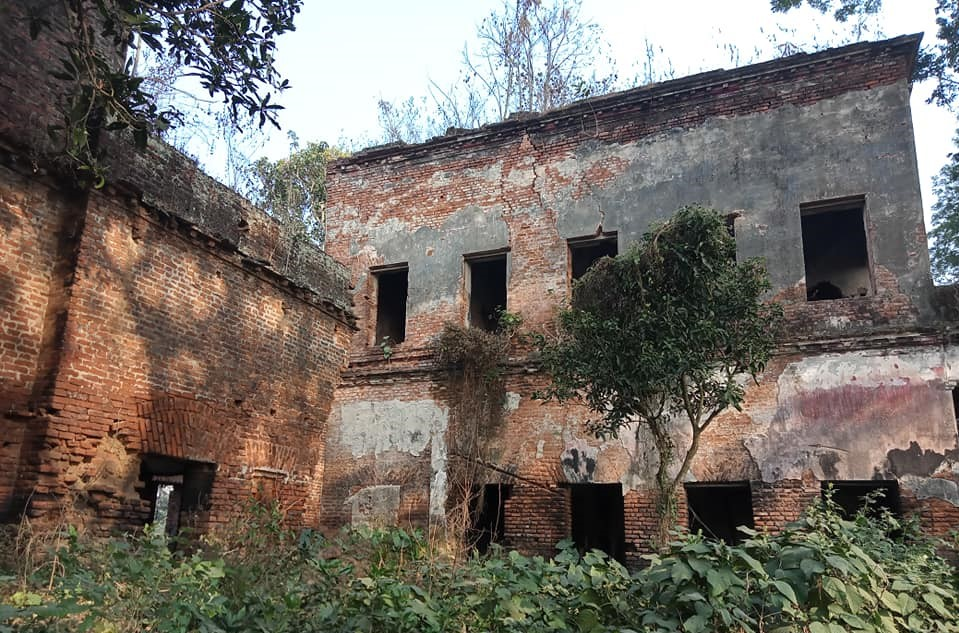
- Khalishpur Indigo Factory, Maheshpur

- Coordinates: 23°21′N 88°54.8′E
- Country: Bangladesh
- Division: Khulna
- District: Jhenaidah

Government
  - Type: Upazilas of Bangladesh
  - Body: Municipal corporation

Area
  - Total: 417.85 km^{2} (161.33 sq mi)

Population (2022)
  - Total: 371,293
  - Density: 888.58/km^{2} (2,301.4/sq mi)
- Time zone: UTC+6 (BST)
- Postal code: 7340
- Area code: 04525
- Website: Official Maps

Maheshpur Upazila mauza geocode map

Maheshpur Upazila (Bengali: মহেশপুর উপজেলা) is a part of Jhenaidah District in Khulna Division, Bangladesh.

== History ==
The original name of Maheshpur Upazila, located on the banks of the Kapotaksha River, was Yogi Daha. Later, in 1701 (according to the Gregorian calendar), when a temple was established in the name of the Hindu god Maheshwar, the original name was changed to Maheshpur. Some say that the area was named Maheshpur after Mahishya King Mahesh Chandra. Another legend is that when the kingdom of that region came into the hands of a Kaivarta king "Mahesh", it was named Maheshpur after him. Maheshpur was a part of the Bangaon subdivision of India. In 1947, Maheshpur came under the Jhenaidah subdivision. Maheshpur was also called Khadya Bhandar or Ratna Bhandar for its abundance of agricultural wealth.

== Geography ==
Maheshpur Upazila has 12 unions, namely: SBK, Fotepur, Pantapara, Shoruppur, Shamkur, Nepa, Kajirber, Bashbaria, Jadoppur, Natima, Mandarbaria and Ajompur. Maheshpur (Town) consists of 9 wards and 14 mahallas. Maheshpur thana was turned into an upazila in 1983.

Maheshpur Upazila shares borders with North 24 Parganas district in West Bengal, India and Chaugachha upazila of Jessore district to the south, Nadia district of West Bengal, India to the west, Jibannagar Upazila of Chuadanga district to the north, and Kotchandpur upazila to the east.

The main river flowing through this upazila is the Kapotakkho Nod.

Maheshpur is located at 23.3500°N 88.9125°E. It has 79,761 households and total area 417.85 km^{2}.

== Demographics ==
Religions in Maheshpur Upazila (2022)
Religion	Percent
Islam	96.51%
Hinduism	3.47%
Other or not stated	0.02%

According to the 2022 Bangladeshi census, Maheshpur Upazila had 98,345 households and a population of 371,293. 8.76% of the population were under 5 years of age. Maheshpur had a literacy rate (age 7 and over) of 70.76%: 72.13% for males and 69.42% for females, and a sex ratio of 98.52 males for every 100 females. 49,286 (13.27%) lived in urban areas.

As of the 2011 Census of Bangladesh, Maheshpur upazila had 79,761 households and a population of 332,514. 66,939 (20.13%) were under 10 years of age. Maheshpur had an average literacy rate of 44.79%, compared to the national average of 51.8%, and a sex ratio of 1,000 females per 1,000 males. 27,670 (8.32%) of the population lived in urban areas.

The area of the town is 11.47 km^{2}. The town has a population of 26,473; male 51.26% and female 48.74%;

== Administration ==
Maheshpur Upazila is divided into Maheshpur Municipality and 12 union parishads: Azampur, Banshbaria, Fatepur, Jadabpur, Kazirber, Manderbaria, Natima, Nepa, Panthapara, S.B.K., Shyamkur, and Swaruppur. The union parishads are subdivided into 150 mouzas and 196 villages.

Maheshpur Municipality is subdivided into 9 wards and 16 mahallas.

=== Upazila Nirbahi Officer (UNO) ===
Name	Official address	Contact number
Khadija Akter, Upazila Nirbahi Officer and Executive Magistrate (36th BCS)	Maheshpur	01324164811

=== Members of Parliament (MP) ===
Legislature	Member of Parliament	Constituency	Party	Profession	Address
12th Parliament	Major General. Salahuddin Miaji	Jhenaidah-3, Seat-83	Bangladesh Awami League (AL)	Bangladesh Army (Rtd)	Moheshpur
11th Parliament	Ad. Shofiqul Azam Khan	Jhenaidah-3, Seat-83	Bangladesh Awami League (AL)	Advocate	Moheshpur
10th Parliament	Mr. Md.Nobi Neowaz	Jhenaidah-3, Seat-83	Bangladesh Awami League (AL)	Business	Kadbila
8th Parliament	Mr. Md. Shahidul Islam	Jhenaidah-3, Seat-83	Bangladesh Nationalist Party (BNP)	Teaching	Bhalypur
7th Parliament	Mr. Md. Shahidul Islam	Jhenaidah-3, Seat-83	Bangladesh Nationalist Party (BNP)	Teaching	Bhalypur
6th Parliament	Mr. Md. Shahidul Islam	Jhenaidah-3, Seat-83	Bangladesh Nationalist Party (BNP)	Teaching	Bhalypur
5th Parliament	Mr. Md. Shahidul Islam	Jhenaidah-3, Seat-83	Bangladesh Nationalist Party (BNP)	Teaching	Bhalypur
4th Parliament	Mr. S.M Muzzammel Haque	Jhenaidah-3, Seat-83	Bangladesh Jamat e Islami (Jamat)	Teaching	Jadobpur
3rd Parliament	Mr. S.M Muzzammel Haque	Jhenaidah-3, Seat-83	Bangladesh Jamat e Islami (Jamat)	Teaching	Jadobpur

=== Upazila Porishad ===
Post	Person	Official address
Pouroshova Meyor	Md.Abdur Rashid Khan	Upazila Porishad, Maheshpur, Jhenaidah
Chairman	Moizuddin Hamid	Upazila Porishad, Maheshpur, Jhenaidah
Vice Chairman	M. A. Abdul Ahad	Upazila Porishad, Maheshpur, Jhenaidah
Mohila Vice Chairman	Mst.Abu sufiyan (hena)	Upazila Porishad, Maheshpur, Jhenaidah

=== Union Porishad ===
S/N	Union	Chairman	Address of Union Porishad	Population
01	S.B.K	Md. Arifan Hasan Chowdhury Nuthan	Vill+Post: Hat-Khalishpur, Thana: Maheshpur, Dist: Jhenaidah	15,495
02	Fatepur	Md. Abul Kashem Sardar (BNP)	Vill: Fatepur, Post: Kanaidanga, Thana: Maheshpur, Dist: Jhenaidah	21,574
03	Pantapara	Md. Ismail Hossain (AL)	Vill: Pantapara, Post: Ji-Pantapara, Thana: Maheshpur, Dist: Jhenaidah	17,072
04	Sharuppur	Md. Julfikar Ali (Jamat)	Vill: Kushadanga, Post: Dattonagar Bazar, Thana: Maheshpur, Dist: Jhenaidah	19,360
05	Shyamkur	Md. Amanulla haque (Awami league)	Vill: Shyamkur, Post: Gurdah Bazar, Thana: Maheshpur, Dist: Jhenaidah	23,223
06	Nepa	Samsul Alam Mridha (AL)	Vill: Sezia, Post: Sezia Bazar, Thana: Maheshpur, Dist: Jhenaidah	23223
07	Kazirber	B.M Selim Reza (AL)	Vill+Post: Shamonta, Thana: Maheshpur, Dist: Jhenaidah	29,633
08	Bashbaria	Nazmul Hoque (zintu) (Ind-AL)	Vill: Vairoba, Post: Vairoba Bazar, Thana: Maheshpur, Dist: Jhenaidah	27,122
09	Jadobpur	Md. A.B.M Shohidul Islam (AL)	Vill: Jadobpur, Post: Hat Jadobpur, Thana: Maheshpur, Dist: Jhenaidah	25,240
10	Natima	Md.Abul Kashem (AL)	Vill+Post: Sostar Bazar, Thana: Maheshpur, Dist: Jhenaidah	22,762
11	Mandarbaria	Md. Aminur Rahman (AL)	Vill: Shankorhuda, Post: Bathangasi, Thana: Maheshpur, Dist: Jhenaidah	25,225
12	Azompur	Md.Dr: Abdus Satter Khan (Jamat)	Vill+Post: Biddadharpur, Thana: Maheshpur, Dist: Jhenaidah	20,625

== Education ==
Maheshpur also has the following educational institutions:

- Mohespur Govt. Degree College
- Bir Sherstha Shahid Hamidur Rahman Govt. College, Khalish Pur Bazar
- Moheshpur Mohila College
- Shohidul Islam degree college, Voiroba, Maheshpur, Jhenaidah
- Moheshpur Gov. Pilot Model High School, Maheshpur, Jhenaidah
- Moheshpur Pouro Laboratory High School, Moheshpur, Jhenaidah
- K.B.S. Secondary School, Kanchonpur, Maheshpur, Jhenaidah
- Samonta High School, Maheshpur, Jhenaidah.
- Samonta Dhakhil Madrasa, Maheshpur, Jhenaidah
- Bhairoba Alhera Fazil (Degree) Madrasah, Voiroba, Maheshpur, Jhenaidah
- Khalishpur Secondary School, Khalishpur Bazar, Maheshpur, Jhenaidah
- Pragoti Biddiyaniketon, High School,Jadabpur, Moheshpur, Jhenaidah

== Notable residents ==
- Hamidur Rahman, recipient of Bir Sreshtho (the highest military award of Bangladesh)

== See also ==
- Upazilas of Bangladesh
- Districts of Bangladesh
- Divisions of Bangladesh
- Thanas of Bangladesh
- Administrative geography of Bangladesh
