= Jhenaidah District =

District in Khulna Division

Jhenaidah District ঝিনাইদহ জেলা
- District of Bangladesh
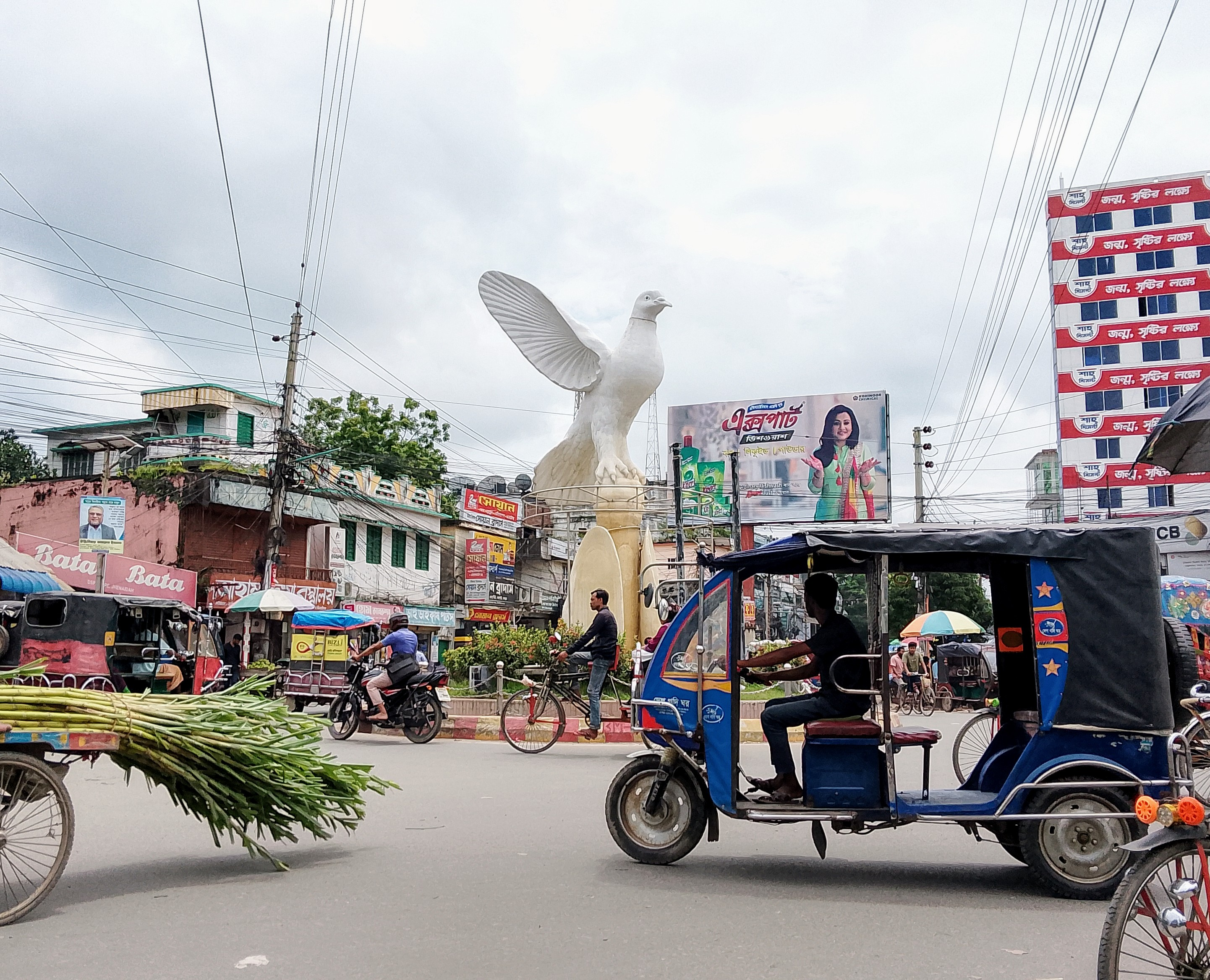
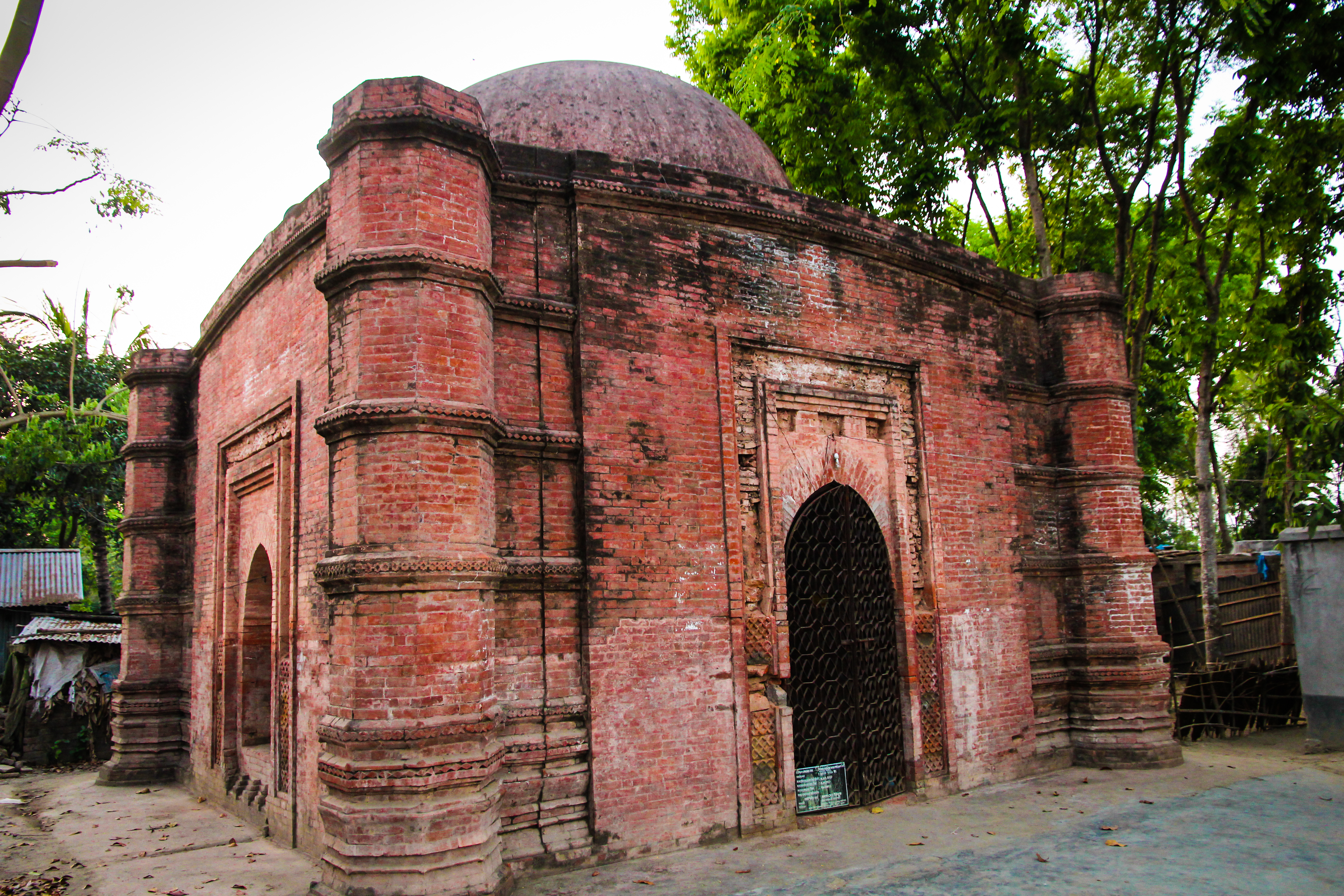
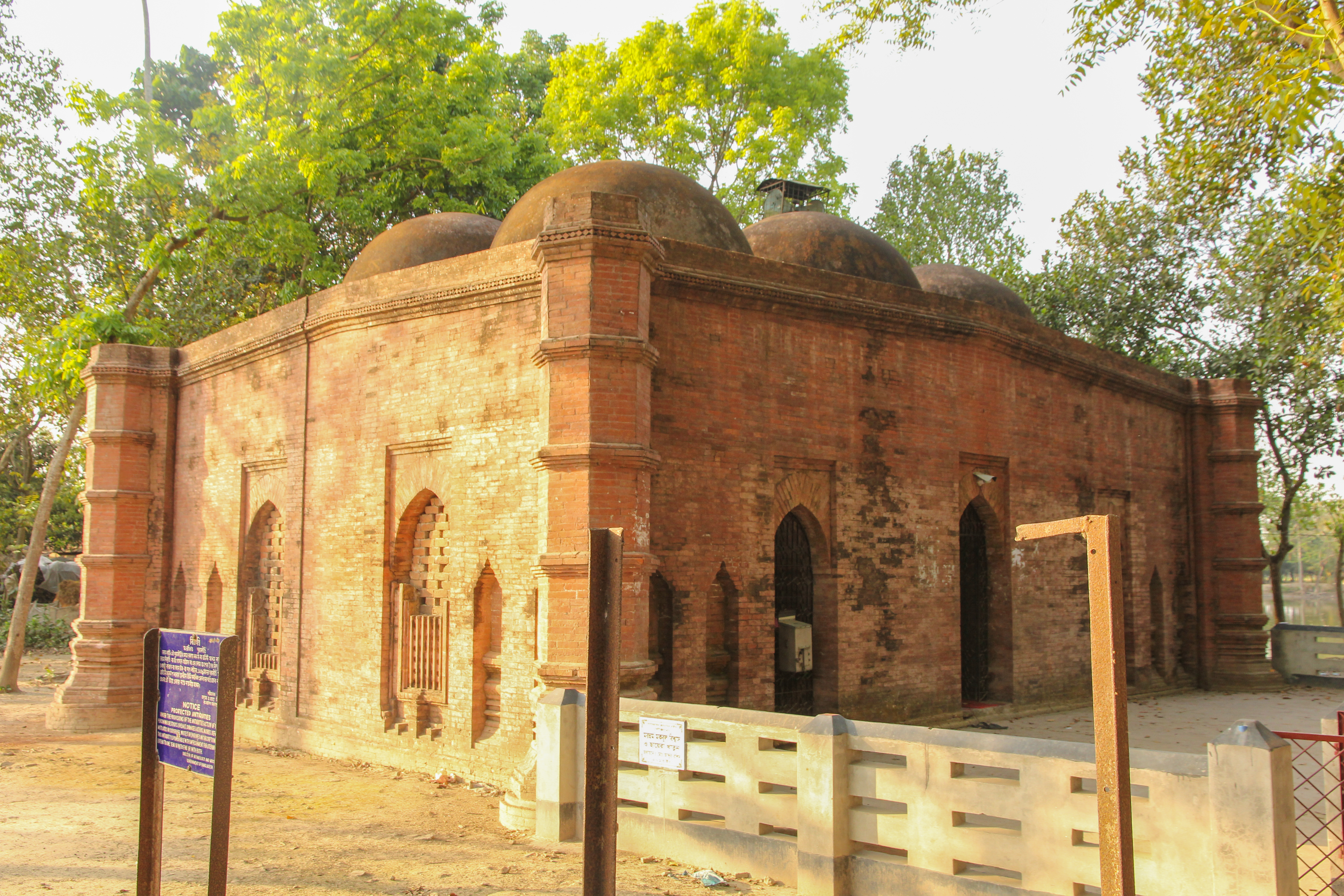
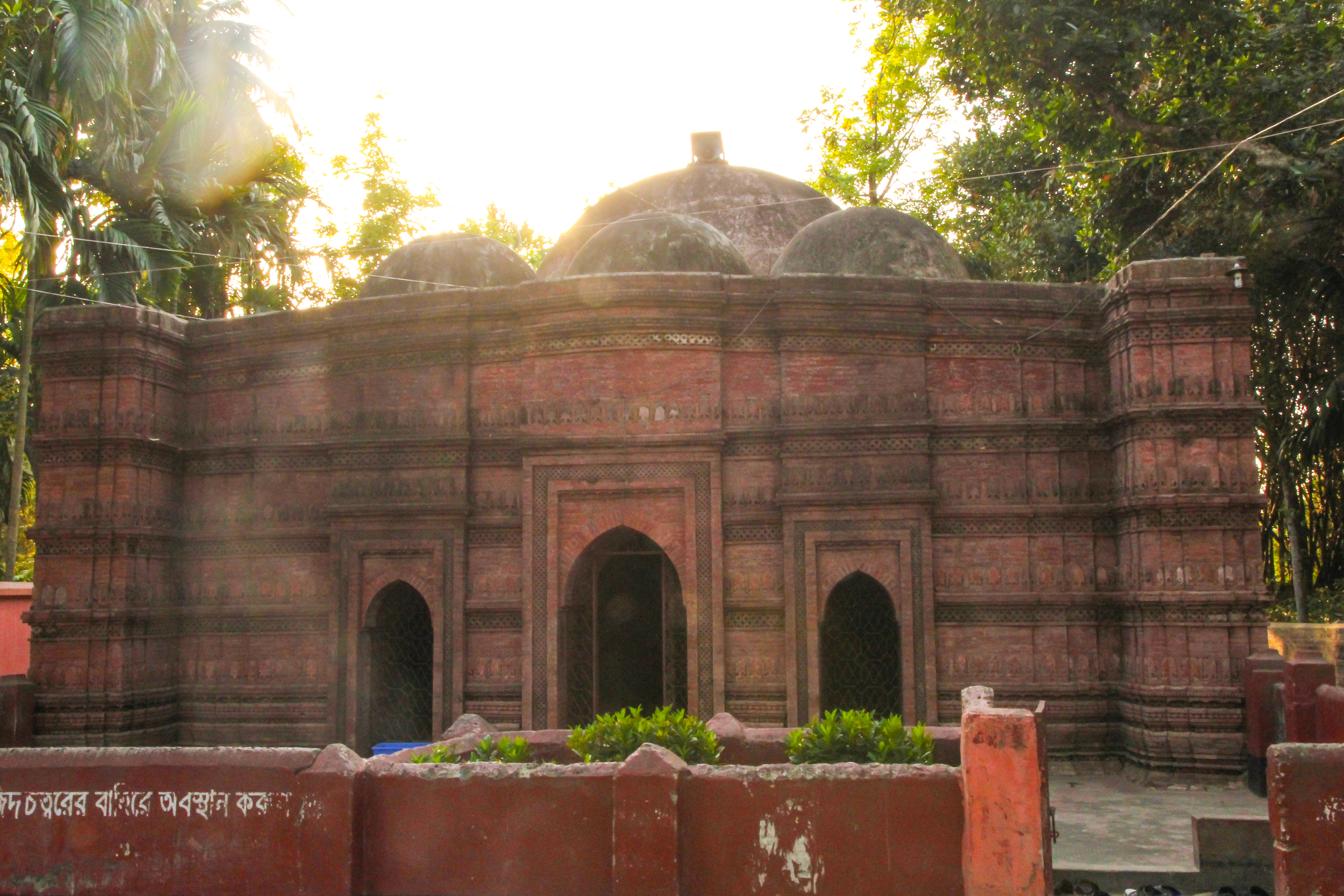
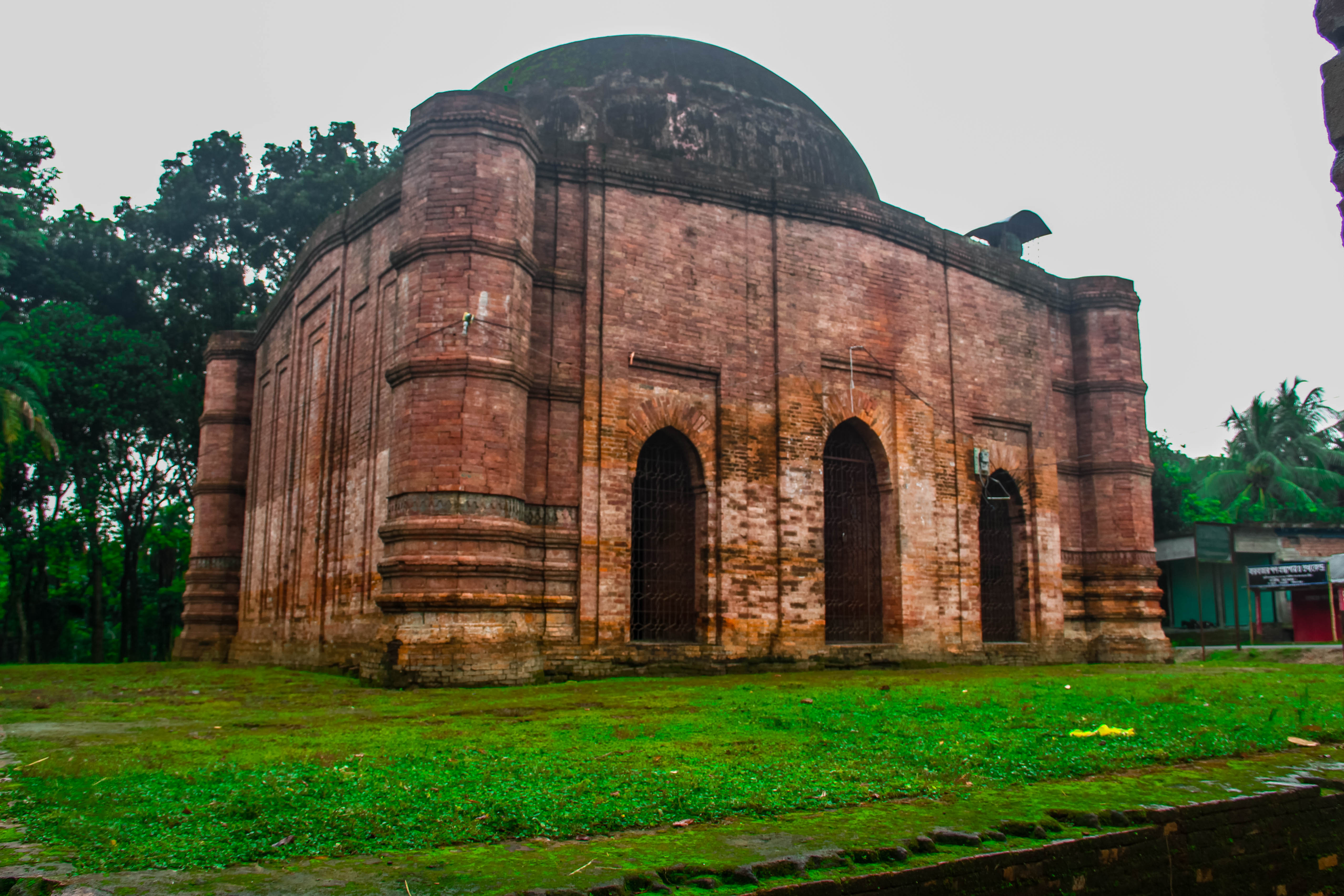
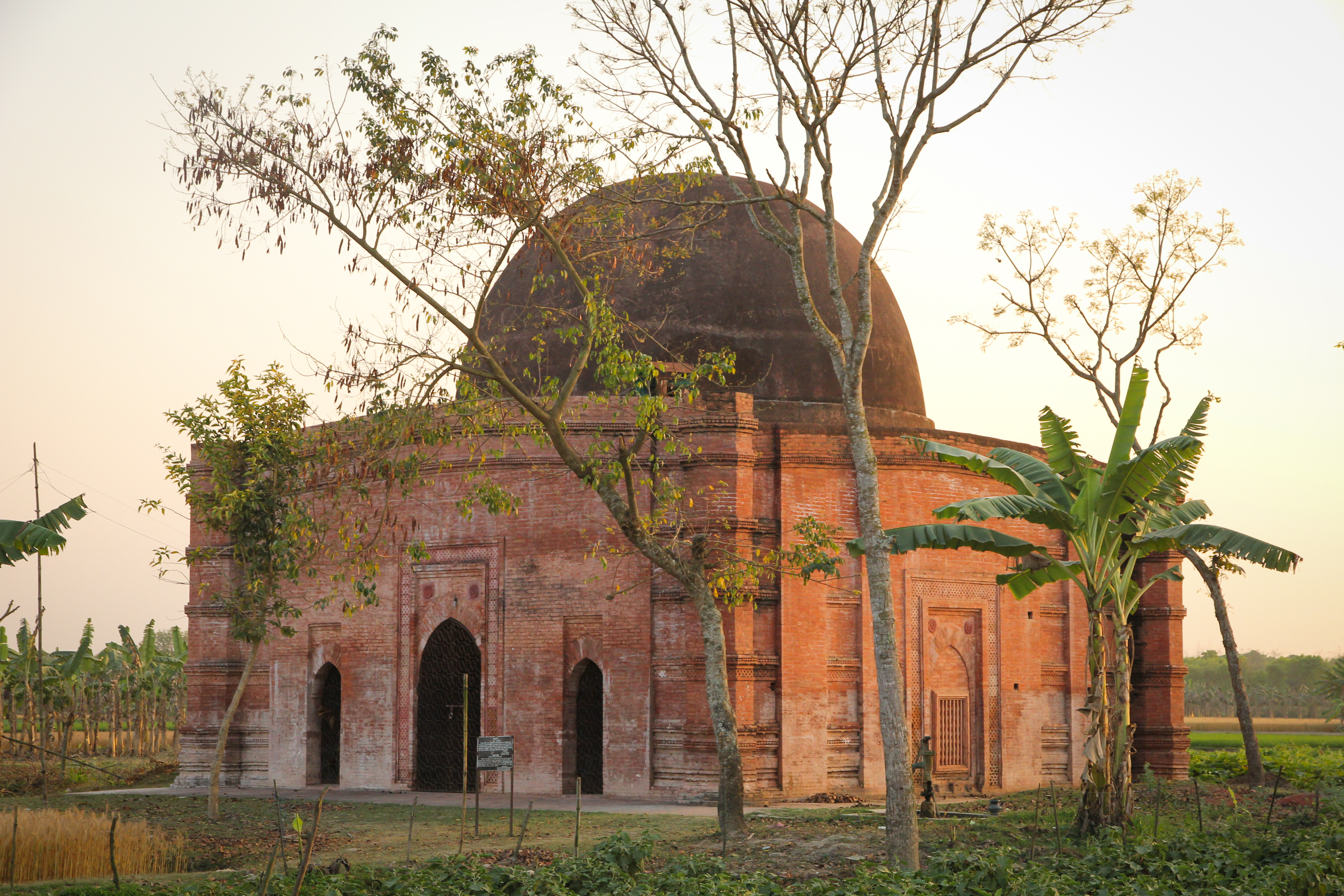
- Clockwise from top: Jhenaidah Paira Chattar, Jhenaidah Golakata Mosque, Jorbangla Mosque, Pir Pukur Masjid, Jhenaidah Pathagar Mosque, Jhenaidah Noongola Masjid,

- Location of Jhenaidah District in Bangladesh
- Interactive map of Jhenaidah District
- Coordinates: 23.54°N 89.00°E
- Country: Bangladesh
- Division: Khulna
- Headquarters: Jhenaidah

Government
  - Deputy Commissioner: Monira Begum

Area
  - Total: 1,964.77 km^{2} (758.60 sq mi)

Population (2022)
  - Total: 2,005,849
  - Density: 1,020.91/km^{2} (2,644.14/sq mi)
- Time zone: UTC+06:00 (BST)
- Postal code: 7300
- Area code: 0451
- ISO 3166 code: BD-23
- HDI (2023): 0.694 medium · 9th of 22

Jhenaidah District (Bengali: ঝিনাইদহ জেলা) is a district in southwestern Bangladesh. Part of the Khulna Division, the district has an area of 1,964.77 km^{2} (758.60 sq mi). It is bordered by Kushtia District to the north, Jessore District and West Bengal to the south, Rajbari District and Magura District to the east, and Chuadanga District and West Bengal to the west. The largest city and headquarters of this district is Jhenaidah. At the beginning of the British rule, Jhenaidah was a police outpost and was turned into a thana in 1793. The Jhenaidah sub-division was established in 1862. It became a district in 1984.

== Geography ==
Annual average temperature: maximum 37.1 °C (98.8 °F), minimum 11.2 °C (52.2 °F)

Annual rainfall: 1,467 mm (57.8 in)

== Demographics ==
Historical population
| Year | Pop. | ±% p.a. |
|---|---|---|
| 1974 | 976,192 | — |
| 1981 | 1,109,875 | +1.85% |
| 1991 | 1,361,280 | +2.06% |
| 2001 | 1,579,490 | +1.50% |
| 2011 | 1,771,304 | +1.15% |
| 2022 | 2,005,849 | +1.14% |

According to the 2022 Census of Bangladesh, Jhenaidah District had 519,295 households and a population of 2,005,849 with an average of 3.82 people per household. Among the population, 336,231 inhabitants (16.76%) were under 10 years of age. The population density was 1,021 people per km^{2}. Jhenaidah District had a literacy rate (age 7 and over) of 72.81%, compared to the national average of 74.80%, and a sex ratio of 1014 females per 1000 males. Approximately 21.09% of the population lived in urban areas. The ethnic minority population was 5,624.

Religions in Jhenaidah District (2022)
| Religion | Percent |
| Islam | 91.55% |
| Hinduism | 8.40% |
| Other or not stated | 0.05% |

Religion in present-day Jhenaidah District
| Religion | 1941 (Note: Jhenaidah subdivision and Maheshpur thana of Bongaon subdivision of Jessore district) | | 1981 | | 1991 | | 2001 | | 2011 | | 2022 | |
| Religion | Pop. | % | Pop. | % | Pop. | % | Pop. | % | Pop. | % | Pop. | % |
|---|---|---|---|---|---|---|---|---|---|---|---|---|
| Islam | 293,886 | 65.40% | 941,983 | 84.87% | 1,198,925 | 88.07% | 1,415,379 | 89.61% | 1,601,086 | 90.39% | 1,836,273 | 91.55% |
| Hinduism | 154,115 | 34.29% | 166,696 | 15.02% | 159,308 | 11.70% | 162,808 | 10.31% | 167,880 | 9.48% | 168,444 | 8.40% |
| Others (Note: Including Jainism, Christianity, Buddhism, Zoroastrianism, Judaism, Ad-Dharmis, or not stated) | 1,386 | 0.31% | 1,196 | 0.11% | 3,047 | 0.23% | 1,303 | 0.08% | 2,338 | 0.13% | 1,132 | 0.05% |
| Total Population | 449,387 | 100% | 1,109,875 | 100% | 1,361,280 | 100% | 1,579,490 | 100% | 1,771,304 | 100% | 2,005,849 | 100% |

Muslims are the majority community. Hindus are the largest minority and have been growing at a much slower pace than the Muslims. There is also a small population of 900 Christians, mainly in Kaliganj Upazila.

== Archeological heritage ==
The ruins of Muhammadabad, once a flourishing mint town of Bengal Sultanate named after Sultan of Bengal Jalaluddin Muhammad Shah, is situated in Kaliganj Upazilla of Jhenaidah district.

Some of the places of interest in Jhenaidah district are:

- Biswabat, Bethuli
- Harihar Garh, Shailkupa
- Shailkupa Jami Mosque, Shailkupa
- Ram Gopal Mandir, Shailkupa
- Kharer Dighi Mosque, Kaliganj
- Jahajghata, Kaliganj
- Sawdaghar Dighi and Mosque
- Gorai Mosque, Kaliganj
- Jorbangla Mosque, Kaliganj
- Galakata Dighi and Mosque, Kaliganj
- Cheragdani Dighi and Mosque
- Dighi of Sree Ram Raja
- Tombs of Ghazi, Kalu & Champabati, Kaliganj
- Dhol Samudra Dighi, Jhenaidah Sadar
- Naldangha Rajbari Kaliganj
- Manasa Mandir, Maheshpur
- Krishna Balaram Dev Bigraha Mandir, Kaliganj
- Neel Kuthi, Madhupur, Jhenaidah Sadar
- Miyar Dalan, Jhenaidah Sadar
- Nungola Mosque, Kaliganj
- Monahar Mosque, Kaliganj
- Pirpukur Mosque, Kaliganj
- Sukur Mallik Mosque, Kaliganj
- Satgachiya Mosque, Kaliganj
- Tombs of Pagla Kanai, Jhenaidah Sadar
- Dhannoharia Purbopara Jame Mosque (Dhannoharia, Jadabpur, Moheshpur, Jhenaidah)

== Administration ==
Deputy Commissioner: Mohammad Abdul Awal

Chairman of Zila Porishod: Md. Arifan Hasan Chowdhury

=== Subdivisions ===
Jhenaidah District upazila geocode map

There are six upazilas under this district:

1. Jhenaidah Sadar Upazila
2. Maheshpur Upazila
3. Kaliganj Upazila
4. Kotchandpur Upazila
5. Shailkupa Upazila
6. Harinakunda Upazila

== City and towns ==
Jhenaidah district includes 1 municipal city Jhenaidah and 5 towns. All are governed by municipalities.

| City/town | Area (km^{2}) | Population (2011) | Population (2022) |
|---|---|---|---|
| Jhenaidah | 32.42 | 107,834 | 140,256 |
| Kaliganj | 15.83 | 45,341 | 58,820 |
| Shailkupa | 20.92 | 35,271 | 39,694 |
| Kotchandpur | 20.16 | 33,094 | 38,213 |
| Maheshpur | 21.16 | 27,670 | 32,778 |
| Harinakunda | 22.26 | 22,011 | 26,161 |

== Education ==
=== University ===
- Islamic University, Bangladesh
- Jashore University of Science and Technology 2nd Campus(Jhenaidah Campus)- Jhenaidah Government Veterinary College

=== Colleges ===
- Government Birshestha Shahid Hamidur Rahman Degree College
- Government K.C. College Jhenaidah
- Government Lalon Shah College, Harinakundu
- Government K. M. H. College, Kotchandpur
- Kotchandpur Paura Mohila Degree College
- Maheshpur Government Degree College
- GOVT.Mahtab Uddin College, Kaliganj
- Moheshpur Poura Mohila Degree College
- Shahid Nur Ali College, Kaliganj
- Shailkupa Government Degree College
- Adil Uddin College
- Jhenaidah College
- Amena Khatun College, Narikelbaria, Jhenaidah
- shailkupa government pilot high school,shailkupa jhenaidah

=== Other tertiary institutions ===
- Institute of Health Technology, Jhenaidah
- Jhenaidah Government Veterinary College
- Jhenaidah Polytechnic Institute
- Sheikh Kamal Textile Engineering College, Jhenaidah

=== School and colleges ===
- Jhenaidah Cadet College
- Kanchannagar Model School and College, Jhenaidah
- Shishu Kunja School & College, Jhenaidah
- Jhenaidah Govt Technical School And College, Jhenidah
- Munuria ML School & College, Munuria, Jhenaidah

=== Secondary schools ===
- Baliadanga M.S Secondary School Kaligonj
- Government Naldanga Bhushan Pilot Secondary School, Kaliganj
- Harinakunda Priyanath High School
- Jhenaidah Government High School
- Jhenaidah Government Girls High School
- Joradah High School, Harinakundu
- Kola Bazar United High School, Kaliganj
- Kotchandpur Girls' High School
- Kotchandpur Govt. Model Pilot Secondary School
- Kotchandpur Secondary School (1899)
- Maheshpur High School
- Maheshpur Pilot Girls' High School
- Raigram Banikanta Secondary School
- Solimunnessa Pilot Girls High School, Kaliganj

== Notable residents ==
- Khandaker Abdullah Jahangir - Bangladeshi Islamic scholar. 1 February 1961 – 11 May 2016), or simply known as Abdullah Jahangir, was a Bangladeshi Islamic scholar, professor, author and television presenter.
- Abul Hasan Jashori – Islamic scholar and a freedom fighter
- Qazi Mu'tasim Billah – Islamic scholar and a former professor at the University of Dhaka
- Abdul Hyee – a member of parliament and a freedom fighter
- Birshrestho Hamidur Rahman – national hero, a sepoy in Bangladesh Army during the Bangladesh Liberation War
- Ila Mitra – activist, peasants movement organizer of the Indian subcontinent, elected member of Vidhan Sabha (Provincial Assembly) four times between 1962 and 1978.
- Golam Mostofa (poet) – Bengali writer and poet
- Pagla Kanai – a Bengali mystic folk singer, baul and philosopher
- Jamal Nazrul Islam – mathematical physicist and cosmologist
- Zillur Rahman- educationist, former vice-chancellor of Jahangirnagar University

== See also ==
- Mobarakganj Sugar Mills Limited
- Kaliganj Upazila, Jhenaidah
- Government Naldanga Bhushan Pilot Secondary School, Jhenaidah
