= History of Jessore =

History of a region of Bangladesh

The Greater Jessore district region predominantly includes the modern districts of Jessore, Jhenaidah, Narail, and Magura in Bangladesh, as well as the Bangaon subdivision of India. Nestled close to the Sundarbans, the region experienced human settlement early on. It served as the capital city of the Samatata realm and passed through several Buddhist and Hindu kingdoms, such as the Palas and Senas. Jessore was ruled by Khan Jahan Ali of Khalifatabad, under the Muslim Sultanate of Bengal, who is credited with establishing the Qasbah of Murali and urbanising the region through advancements in transportation and civilization. Jessore later came to be ruled by various kings, such as Pratapaditya, and became familiar to contemporary European travellers as Chandecan before being annexed to the Mughal Empire in the seventeenth century. By 1757, the British East India Company had dominated and started to establish themselves in the region. British rule lasted up until 1947, with Jessore coming under the Provisional Government of Bangladesh from 1971 onwards.

== Ancient ==
It is thought that Jessore was a sparsely populated fenland in ancient times, being situated between the Suhma kingdom and the Vanga kingdom. Ruins of an ancient temple dating back to the 2nd century have been discovered in Donar, Manirampur. By the fifth century, the Jessore region came under the control of the Vanga kingdom. Alexander Cunningham suggests that Jessore was the capital of the Buddhist Samatata kingdom, which Xuanzang of Tang China visited in the 630s and mentioned in his book, the Great Tang Records on the Western Regions. It is said that Vanga lost control of Jessore after the invasion of King Jessobarman of Kannauj. Jessore then successively came under the rule of the Palas and Senas.

== Medieval ==
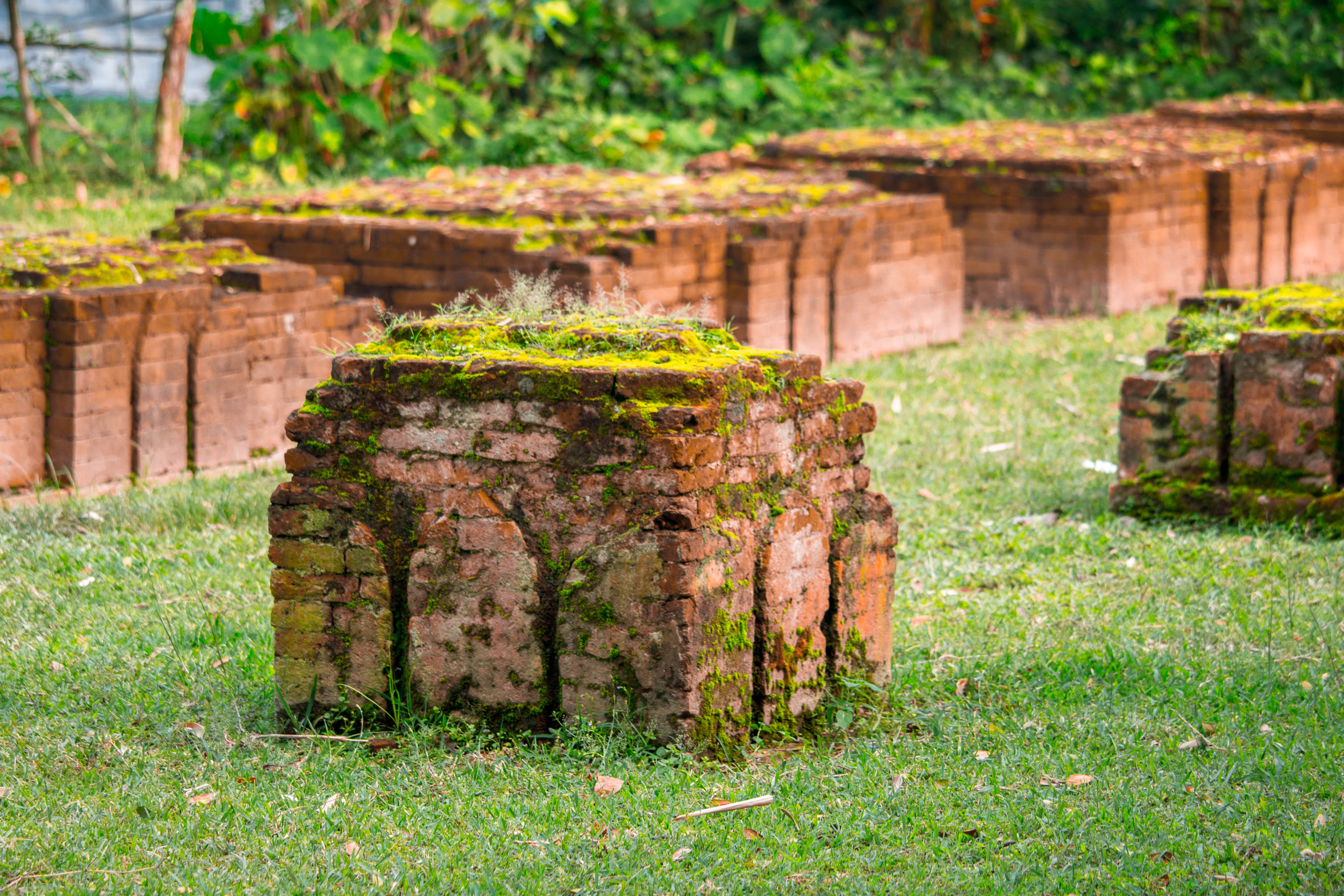
Ruins of a pillar of the Sultanate-period Manohar Mosque in Baro Bazar.

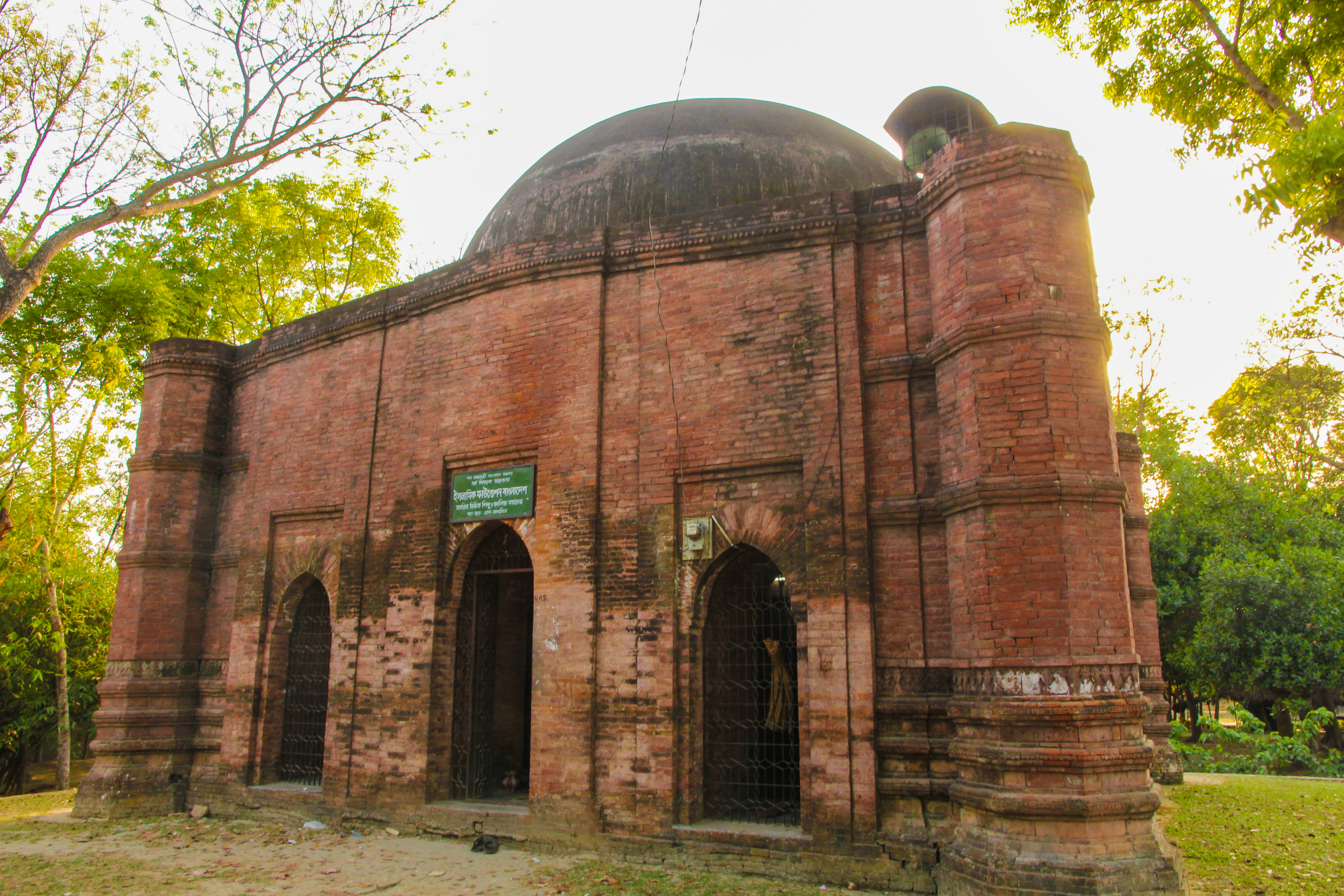
The Jor Bangla Mosque is one of the many historic mosques in the town of Baro Bazar.

A caravan of 25 Muslim preachers was said to have arrived in the greater Jessore region following the Umayyad conquest of Sindh in 711 AD, developing a small minority community in the area. In the following centuries, a further ten large caravans of ghazis, predominantly from the Arabian Peninsula, permanently settled in the regions of Jessore, Khulna, and the 24 Parganas. Notable personalities among this later group include Gazi Pir, Zayed Ghazi, Ahmad Ghazi, Hussaini Ghazi, Muhammad Ghazi, Mawdud Ghazi, Mubashar Ghazi, Momin Ghazi, Amjad Ghazi, Sahib Ghazi, Abdullah, and Sanaullah Rana-Ghazi. Four of these ghazis established the village of Dariapur in Sreepur, Magura, as their hub. The settlement of these Muslim populations influenced local Buddhists and Hindus to convert to Islam.

Muhammad Bakhtiyar Khalji's conquest of Bengal in 1202 formally established Muslim rule in the region. During the early 14th century, Bengal was divided between three small divisions: Sonargaon in the east, Lakhnauti in the west, and Satgaon in the south. Izzuddin Yahya was appointed by Muhammad bin Tughluq as the governor of southern Bengal, and he encouraged conversion to Islam among the Buddhist and Hindu populations. Yahya was succeeded by Shamsuddin Ilyas Shah, who established the independent Sultanate of Bengal. Several Sufi dervishes started to propagate Islam in Jessore after this period, including Syed Shahadat Ali. In the mid-15th century, the Sultan of Bengal appointed Khan Jahan Ali as the ruler of Khalifatabad, which included the greater Jessore region. Ali resided in Champanagar (renamed Baro Bazar after his 12 disciples), which served as a centre of medieval Bengali civilisation. 126 dighis are attributed to him in Jhenaidah, and mosques built there during his stay include Gorar Mosque, Galakata Mosque, Jorbangla Mosque, Pir Pukur Mosque, Satgachia Mosque, Manohar Mosque, Shukur Mallik, Nungola Mosque, Pathagar Mosque and Singdaha Awliya Mosque. Damdama and the dighis of Galakata and Saudagar can also be found here. He was also known to have established the Qasbah (township) of Murali and connected it with other small towns in Jessore, such as Bogchar, by completing Ghazi's long road (now known as Khanjalir Jangal) which originally went from Barobazar to Murali-Qasba (Jessore town), extending it to his capital. Ali also entrusted two of his disciples, Gharib Shah and Burhan Shah, to preach Islamic teachings in Qasba (Jessore town). The Shailkupa Shahi Mosque was built during the reign of Sultan Nasiruddin Nasrat Shah, who appointed Mawlana Sufi Muhammad Arab to propagate there. Among his disciples were Shah Abdul Qadir and Abdul Hakim Khan. Raja

After the fall of the Hussain Shahi dynasty, Bengal experienced political fragmentation. Jashore saw the establishment of a local dynasty. During the so-called twelve-lord period of Bengal, Pratapaditya was a quasi-independent ruler of Jashore who built up a significant local military force, including a large fleet. Following the invasions of Man Singh and Islam Khan Chishti, the reign of Jashore passed to new landlords sanctioned by the Mughal Empire. Pratapaditya was portrayed in various poetic, semi-legendary, or hagiographic works by authors like Bharat Chandra, Ramram Basu, and Sarala Devi Chaudhurani, among others.

== Mughal period ==
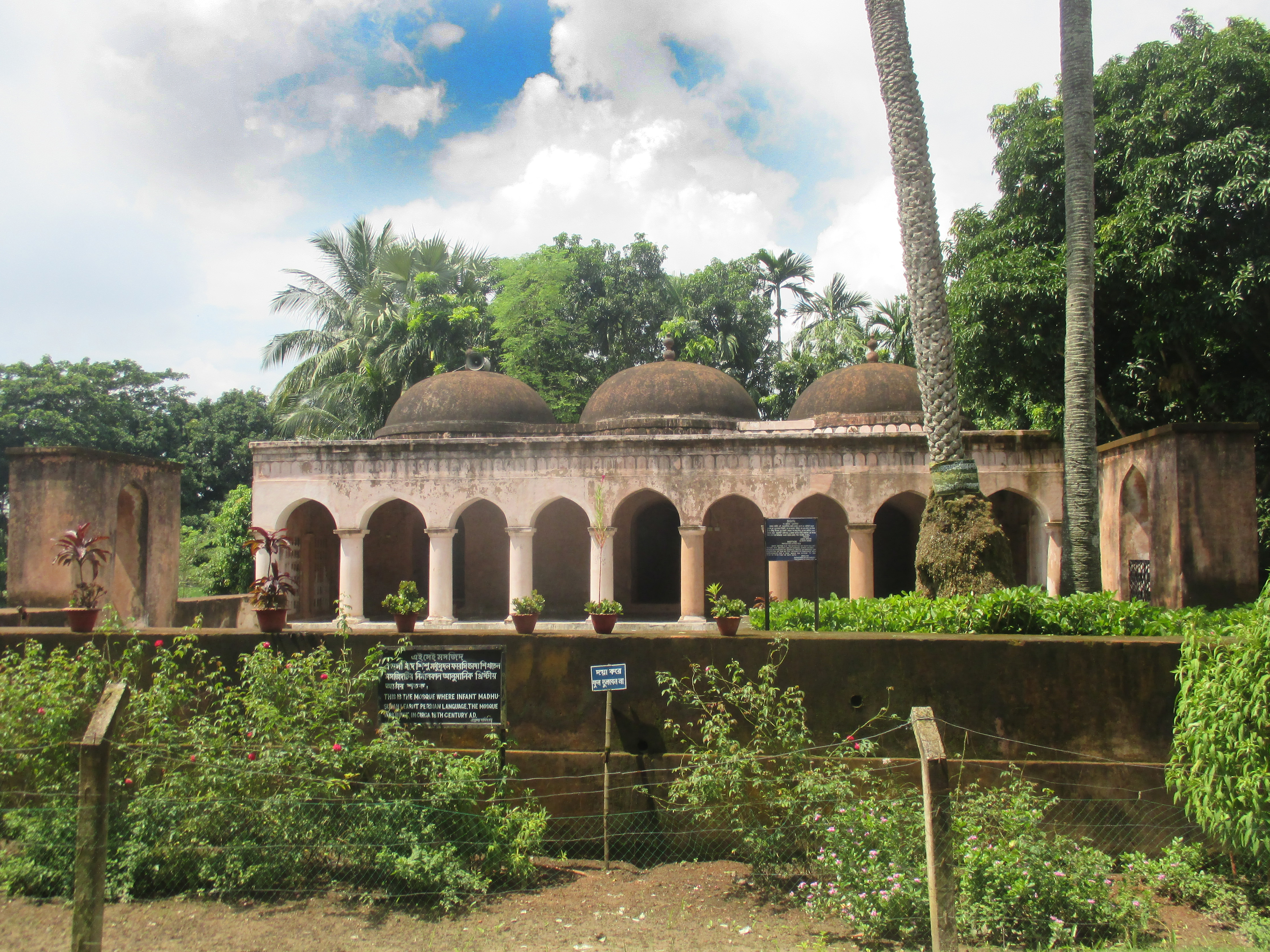
The Sheikhpur Jame Mosque dates back to the Mughal period

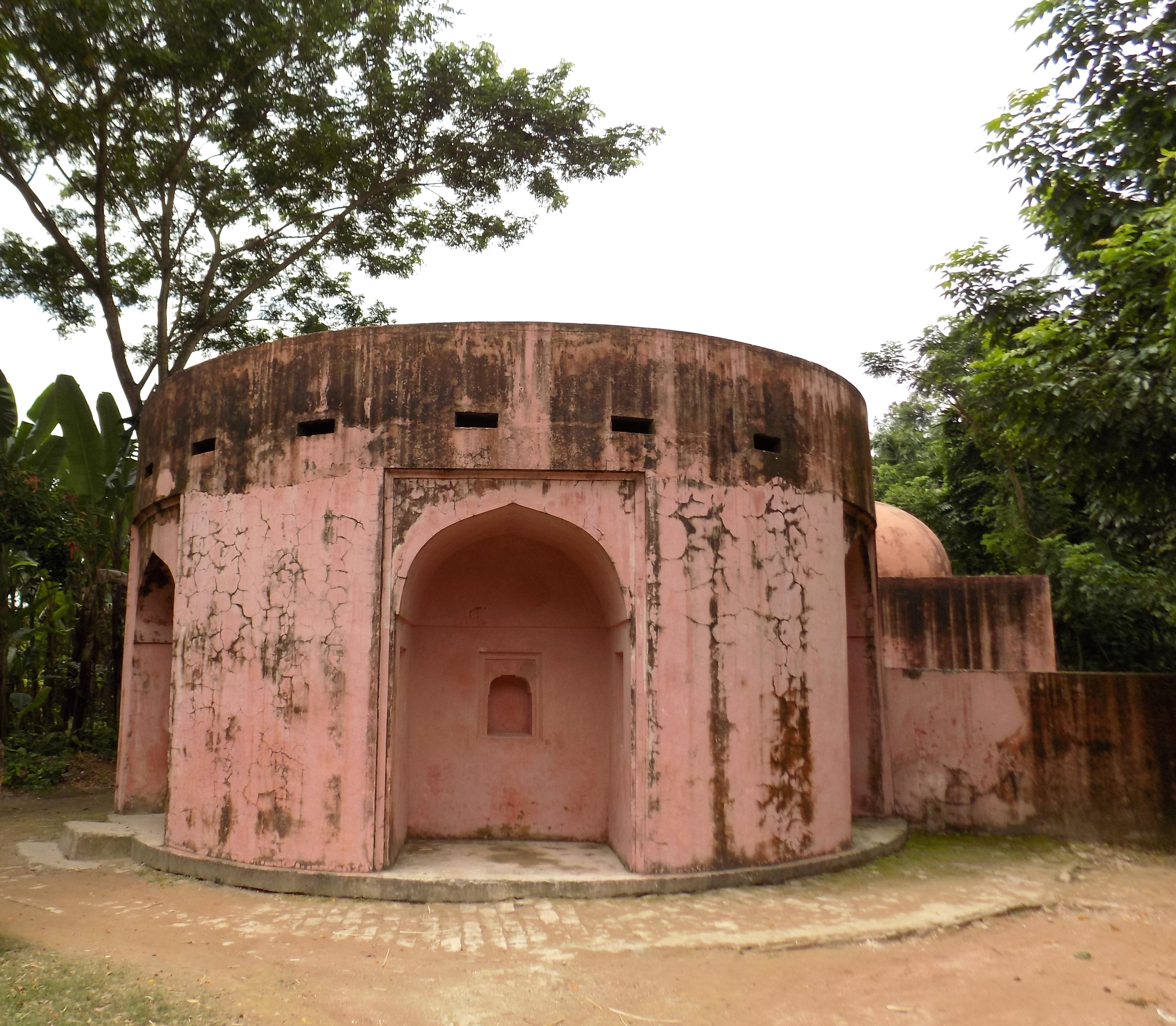
The Mughal governor of Jessore's bathing-house in his palace in Mirzanagar

The Mughal invasions and conquests in Bengal started during the reigns of Emperors Humayun and Akbar. The Battle of Rajmahal in 1576 led to the execution of Daud Khan Karrani, ending the Karrani sultanate. Jessore later came to be ruled by an independent chieftain known as Pratapaditya, though the region was conquered by the Mughal Army earlier than other parts of Bengal. Under the Mughals, northern Jessore was administered under the Mahmudabad sarkar, while southern Jessore was made a part of the Khalifatabad sarkar. In 1589, a group of Mughal soldiers based in Ghoraghat rebelliously captured Jessore. As a response, Man Singh I, the Subahdar of Bengal, dispatched an army led by his son, Jagat Singh, to defeat the rebels and reclaim Jessore as a territory of Mughal Bengal. Raja Sitaram Ray named the town of Mahmudpur in honour of Sufi Mahmud Shah of Magura. Shah Sultan Ahmad arrived in Jessore as a member of Man Singh's army and became established in the region as a prominent Sufi. Raja Shukdev of Chanchra arranged for Ahmad's tax-free land grant in Singhra (now in Jessore town). Shah Abdul Karim's Ershad-i-Khaleqia work is the oldest book on Sufism written in the region.

A church was set up by Catholic Jesuit priests in c. 1600, which was the first ever church in eastern Bengal. In the later Mughal period, a faujdar (sometimes referred to as a nawab) would be appointed by the subahdar to govern Jessore. The governor's residence, known as the Mirzanagar Nawab Bari, was built in Keshabpur in c. 1649. The complex consists of a residential building, mosque, bathing house, and fort. It was especially prominent under Mirza Shafshikan and Nurullah Khan, both of whom were Faujdars of Jessore. In the mid-1690s, Khan was ordered by the Governor of Bengal to march from Jessore and defeat the rebels in Burdwan following the murder of Raja Krishna Ram Roy.

During the reign of Nawab Murshid Quli Khan, a local zamindar in Jessore known as Sitaram Ray revolted against the Mughal rule, but was defeated by the imperial forces. The Chachra Shiv temple, for example, is an eight-eaves (at-chala) temple dedicated to the Hindu Lord Shiva that was constructed by the local landlord Manohar in 1696. The temple stands in Jessore Sadar today. A descendant of Shah Ali Baghdadi by the name of Shah Hafiz arrived in Magura from Girdah in Faridpur, where he established a khanqah in the 18th century. Hafiz was granted tax-free land in Naldanga by the Hindu zamindar. His village in Magura was later renamed to Alokdia (light-giving) in memory of his preaching.

== British rule ==
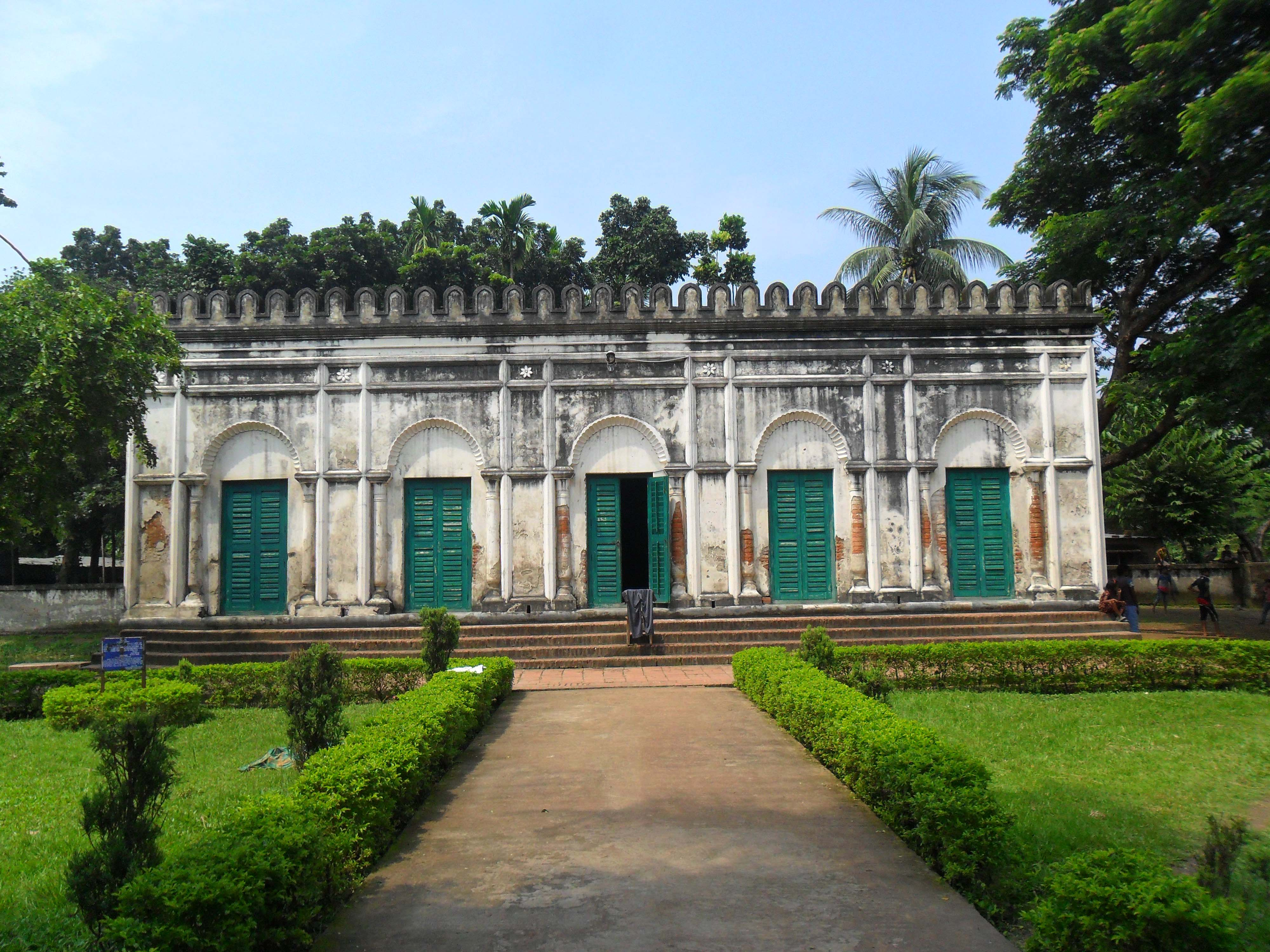
An imambara established by Haji Mohsin in Jessore

After the establishment of British colonial rule, Jashore was declared as a separate district for the British administrative system. The famous Bengali author Bankim Chandra Chattopadhyay served as the deputy collector and deputy magistrate of Jashore for some time. In 1868, the Jashore municipality (Paurasabha) was established. The district school was established in 1838, a public library in 1851, and an airport in the 1920s–1930s. A cantonment was set up in Jessore.

An indigo revolt was initiated by farmers in Jessore between 1860 and 1861.

== Post-partition ==
During the 1971 Bangladesh liberation war, the Jessore road was a key route of Bengali refugees streaming into India for shelter against the atrocities of the Pakistani military forces that occupied East Bengal. The poet Allen Ginsberg wrote his famous poem "September on Jessore Road" after visiting the refugee camps. On March 30, 1971, the Bengali soldiers in Jessore Cantonment revolted against the Pakistani regime. Bengali freedom fighters organized resistance in Jashore. In November 1971, a pitched battle was fought in Chaugachha between the Pakistani army and the Bangladeshi freedom fighters supported by the Indian allied forces, where the former was routed. On December 6, 1971, Jashore became the first district of Bangladesh to become independent.
