= Government Naldanga Bhushan Pilot Secondary School =

Government secondary school in Kaliganj, Jhenaidah, Bangladesh

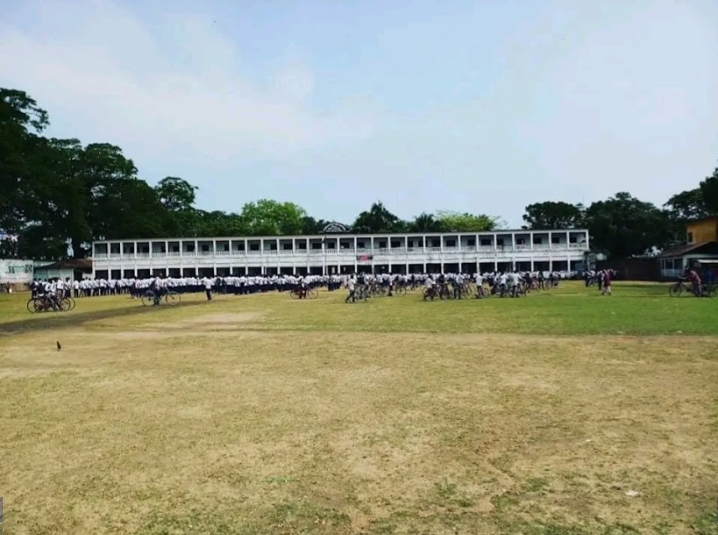
- Administrative Building

Location
- Nishchintapur, Kaliganj, Naldanga-7350, Bangladesh; 23.4070°N 89.1382°E

Information
- Type: Government secondary school
- Motto: Read in the name of your Lord who created
- Established: January 1, 1882; 144 years ago
- Founder: Raja Indu Bhushan Debray
- Status: Active
- School board: Jashore Board
- School district: Jhenaidah District
- Session: January–December
- School code: 116567
- Headmaster: Md. Maqbul Hossain
- Teaching staff: 38
- Employees: 8
- Grades: 6th–10th
- Gender: Co-ed: At present only boys are taken for admission test
- Age range: 10–16
- Enrollment: 1000+
- Language: Bengali
- Campus size: 4.25 Acres
- Campus type: Urban
- Colors: White, Navy blue and blue
- Nickname: Bhushan School
- Website: www.nbpss.edu.bd

Government Naldanga Bhushan Pilot Secondary School (Bengali: সরকারি নলডাঙ্গা ভূষণ পাইলট মাধ্যমিক বিদ্যালয়) is a secondary school located in Kaliganj Upazila, Jhenaidah District, Bangladesh. The school was established in 1882.

== History ==
This school was first established in 1869 by Raja Indu Bhushan Debray of the royal lineage in Rajbari, Naldanga, in the northern part of Kaliganj Upazila, Jhenaidah District, as "Middle English School." Subsequently, in 1882, it was upgraded to "English High School" under the patronage of Prince Raja Bahadur Pramoth Bhushan Debray.

C.K. Ganguly, the then sub-divisional officer of Jhenaidah District, inspected the school for the first time. In February 1883 Mr Beighton, District Magistrate and collector of Jessore (now Jashore), also visited. The school held its first entrance examination in 1888, and one out of two candidates passed. At that time, there were 79 students, all Hindu.

In 1909 the school received permanent approval from the University of Calcutta. In 1915 the president's divisional inspector of Dhaka Division, Khan Bahadur Ahsan Ullah, expressed regret during his visit to the school due to the absence of any Muslim students or teachers. Consequently Muslim teachers were subsequently appointed.

After Bahadur departed for Calcutta, the school temporarily fell into disuse at the Naldanga Rajbari site. In 1935, through the efforts of several education enthusiasts in Kaliganj, the school was relocated to its current location at the Kaliganj Sadar Office.

In 1936, in observance of Raja's 5th Jubilee Celebration, poet Rabindranath Tagore donated 3.41 acres of land for the extensive playground adjacent to the Balidapara School.

In 1956, based on the recommendation of the Divisional School Inspector, the school received government approval for the first time in 1957.

During 1962–1963 funds totalling Tk 56,000 were allocated for the construction of the school building under a dual development plan. In 1965–1966, the school received Tk 66,800 in funding. Since then, the school has been authorized by the government to offer branches in science, agriculture, commerce, and industrial arts, with an enrollment of 800 students.

From 1945 to 1947 Kashinath Dutt ran the secretariat of the board of governors of the government Naldanga Bhushan Pilot Secondary School. In 1947, he resigned from office until 1951. At the time, Kalipada Kanjilal acted as assistant editor. In 1952, social activist S.M.A. Karim was elected secretary. He served in this position 17 years.

In 1992 the school submitted necessary documents to the Ministry of Education for government recognition but was not nationalized. Under the efforts of Member of Parliament for Jhenaidah-4, Anwarul Azim Anar, and under the patronage of Prime Minister Sheikh Hasina, it was nationalized from 25 February 2016. The current name of the school is Government Naldanga Bhushan Pilot Secondary School.

== Educational program ==
While both boys and girls have the opportunity to study at this school, due to a smaller number of female students, currently only boys receive education from classes 6 to 10 at this institution.

== Result ==
The pass rate of students participating in public examinations at the school is consistently good each year.

Year	Name of exam	Examinee	Passed	Pass rate (%)
2019	SSC	165	161	97.58
2020	SSC	133	131	98.50
2021	SSC	118	118	100
2022	SSC	143	143	100
2023	SSC	142	137	96.5

== Infrastructure ==
The school consists of an administrative building, a model building, and another facilities building.

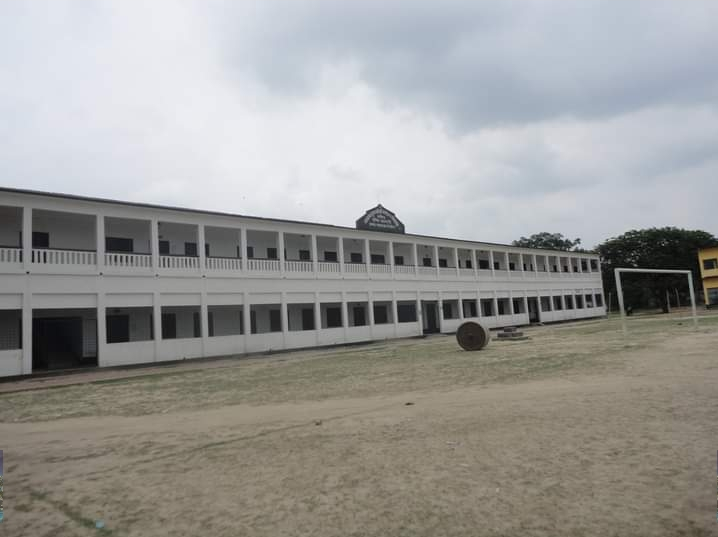
Administrative Building of Government Naldanga Bhushan Pilot Secondary School

- Administrative Building: This building houses the principal's office, assistant teachers' rooms, and a large hall. Previously used for classrooms on the upper floor, it now serves as a scout troop meeting place.

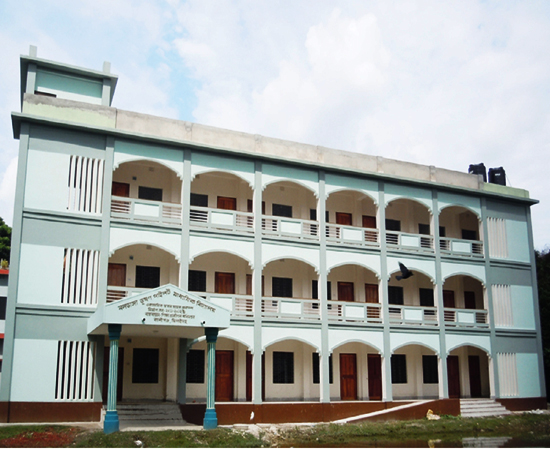
Model Building of Government Naldanga Bhushan Pilot Secondary School

- Model Building: The first and second floors of this building accommodate classes from sixth to eighth grades, while the third floor serves as a computer lab.

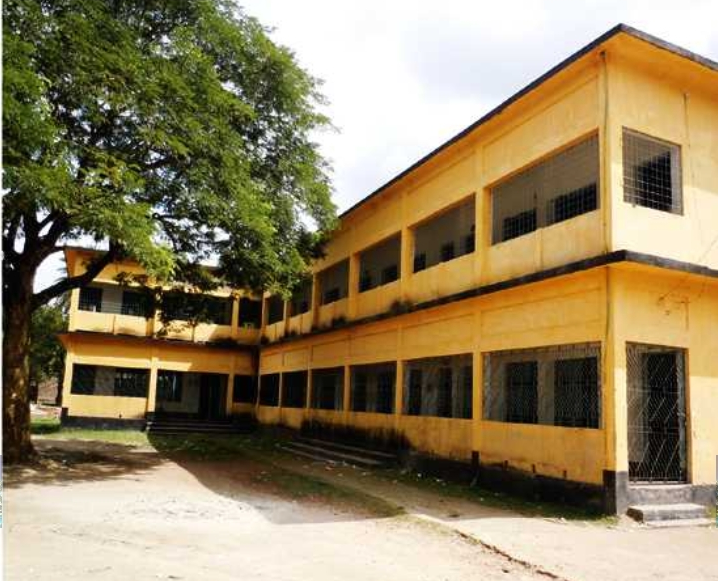
Facilities Building of Government Naldanga Bhushan Pilot Secondary School

- Facilities Building: This building houses a library, vocational education facilities, and a prayer room on the ground floor. The second floor hosts classes for ninth and tenth grades.

The school has laboratories for physics, chemistry, biology, IT, and other subjects for student research.

== Sports and cultural activities ==
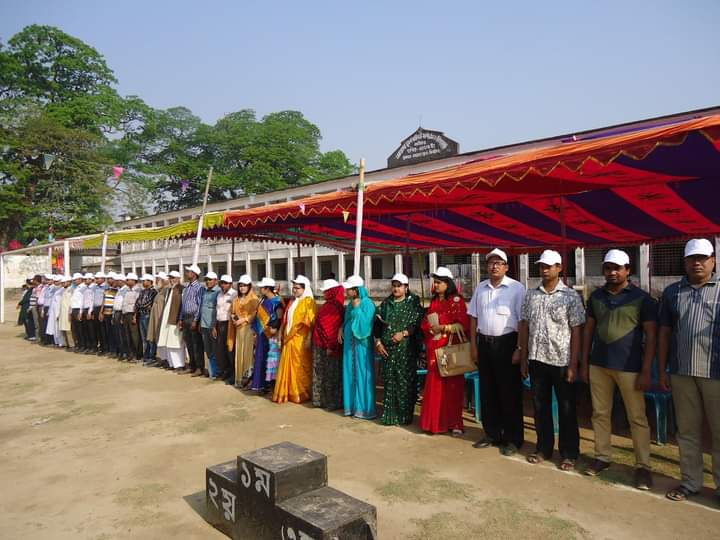
Teachers in annual sports competition

The students have a playground located in front of the main building. This field is used for the school's annual sports competition, Interschool sports tournament and intra-school sports tournament. Various cultural activities are held throughout the year at the school.

== See also ==
- Jhenaidah Sadar Upazila
- Jhenaidah District
- Kaliganj Upazila, Jhenaidah
