= Mobarakganj Sugar Mills Limited =

Sugar refining Industry

Coordinates: 23.3943°N 89.1350°E

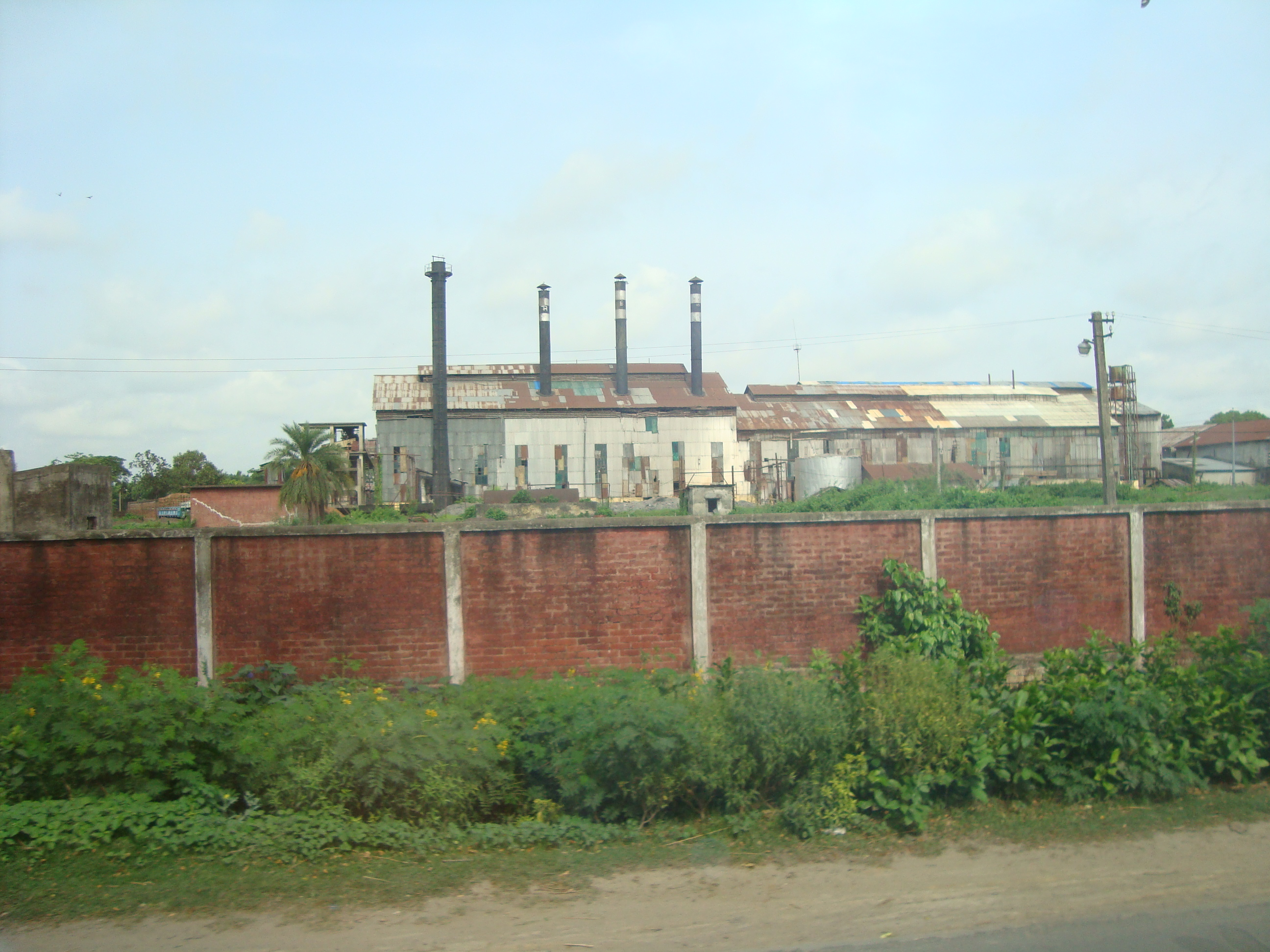
- Native name: Mobarakganj Chinikol Limited Bengali: মোবারকগঞ্জ চিনিকল লিমিটেড
- Company type: Government
- Industry: Sugar industry Fertiliser Industry
- Founded: 1965; 61 years ago
- Headquarters: Mobarakganj, Kaliganj Upazila, Jhenaidah, Bangladesh
- Area served: Worldwide
- Products: Sugar, Organic fertilizer, Molasses, Starch
- Owner: Bangladesh Sugar and Food Industries Corporation
- Website: www.bsfic.gov.bd

Mobarakganj Sugar Mill Limited is the only heavy industrial enterprise in the southern region of Jhenaidah District. It is one of the main sugar mills in Bangladesh.

== Location ==
This industrial facility is situated in Mobarakganj, Naldanga, in Kaliganj Upazila of Jhenaidah District, Khulna Division within the southwestern region of Bangladesh.

== History ==
Construction of this industrial institution began in 1965 and concluded in 1968, with sugar production starting from 1967-68. After gaining independence in the Liberation War of Bangladesh, in 1972, the Bangladesh government declared this institution a state-owned enterprise.

== Infrastructure ==
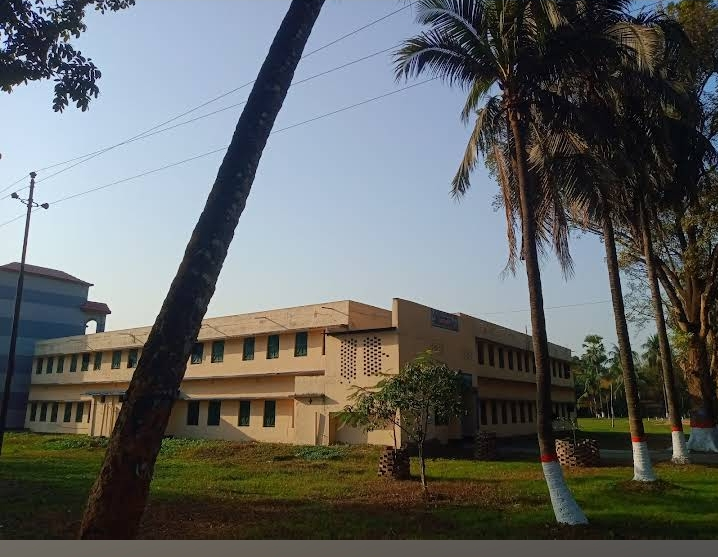

This large-scale industrial establishment is structured to include a sugar production factory, commercial farms, a bio-fertilizer plant, offices, schools, guesthouses, and residential buildings.

=== Production capacity ===
12500 metric tons

=== Manufactured goods ===
- Sugar

Additionally, molasses, bagasse, and press mud are other by-products.

== Gallery ==
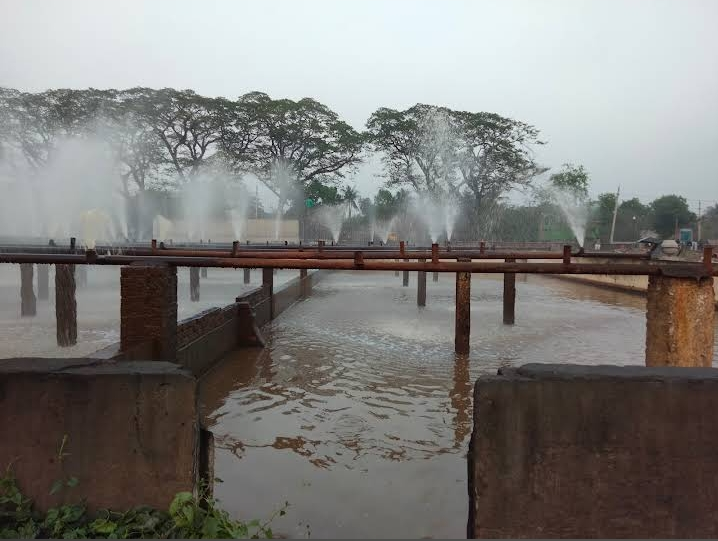
Hot Water Fountain

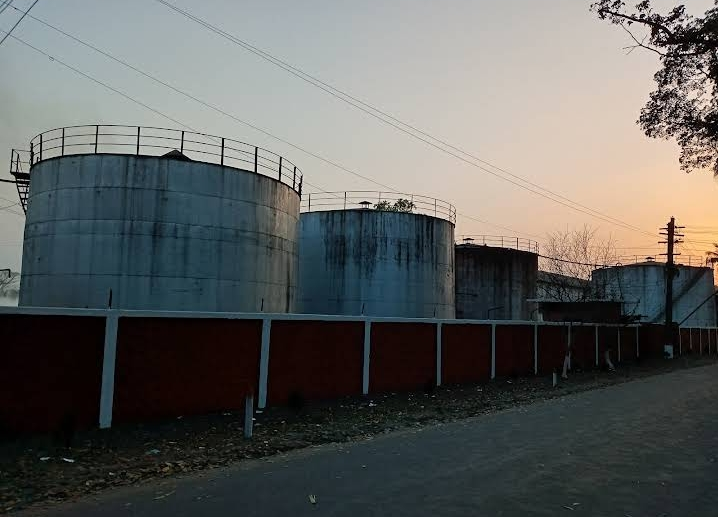

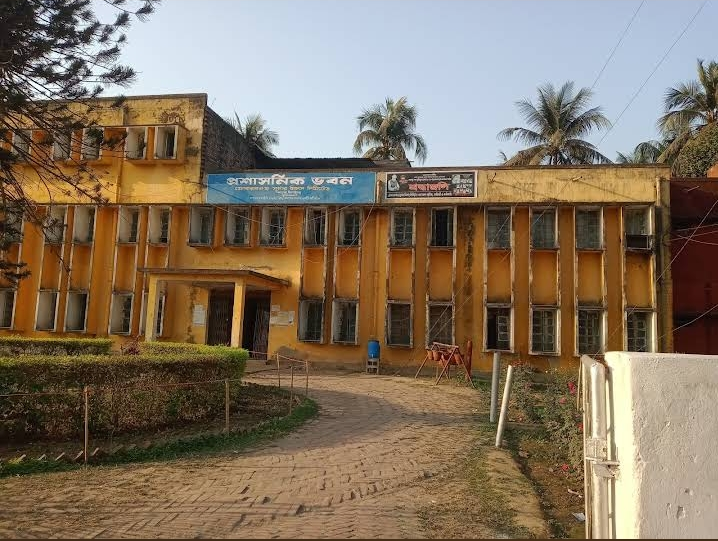
Administrative Building

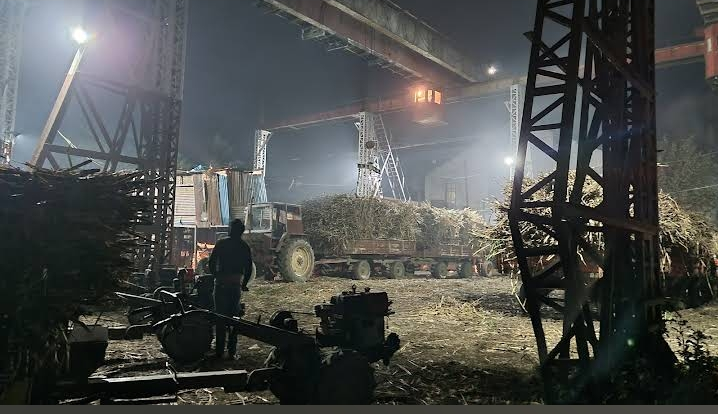

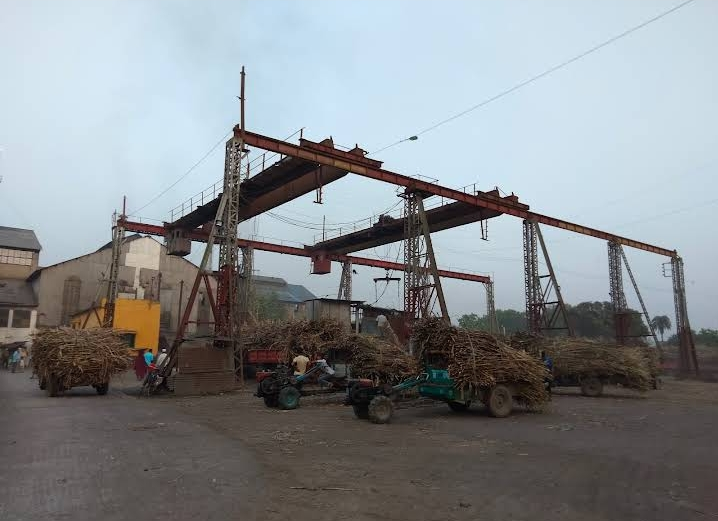

== See also ==
- Bangladesh Sugar and Food Industries Corporation
- Kaliganj Upazila, Jhenaidah
- Jhenaidah District
- Government Naldanga Bhushan Pilot Secondary School
