= Pirpukur Mosque =

Mosque in Jhenaidah, Bangladesh

- পীরপুকুর মসজিদ
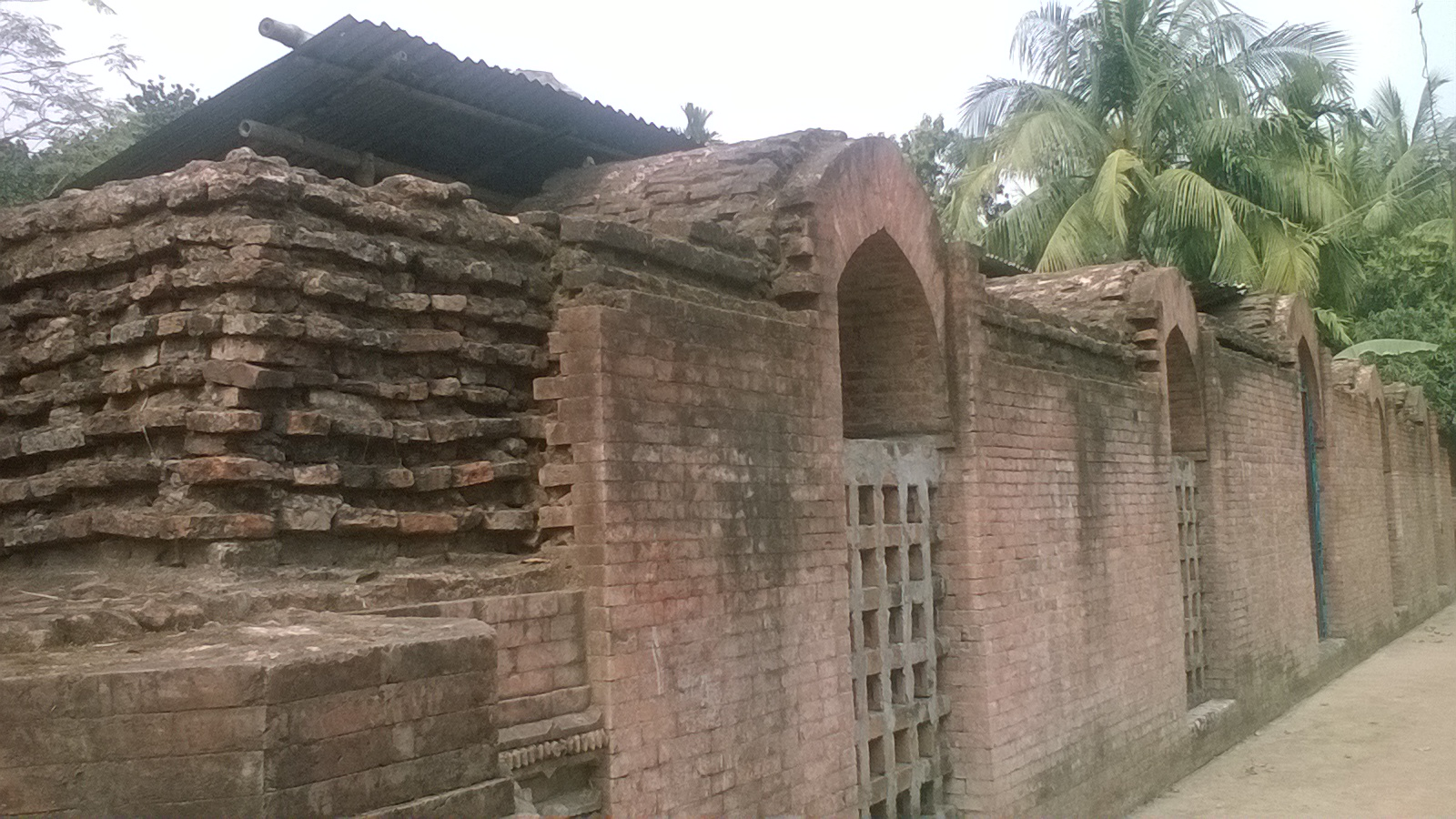

Religion
- Affiliation: Islam
- Sect: Sunni
- District: Jhenaidah District
- Festivals: Eid ul-Fitr, Eid ul-Adha
- Ecclesiastical or organisational status: Mosque
- Ownership: Department of Archaeology (Bangladesh)
- Status: Ruins/Preserved

Location
- Location: Pirpukur, Barobazar Union, Kaliganj Upazila, Jhenaidah District, Bangladesh
- Municipality: Barobazar
- Country: Bangladesh

Architecture
- Type: Mosque
- Style: Sultanate

Specifications
- Direction of façade: West
- Length: 18.40 m
- Width: 10.85 m
- Height (max): 4.3 m
- Dome: 15
- Minarets: 4 (octagonal corner towers, ruined)
- Materials: Red brick

Pirpukur Mosque is an archaeological site located in Jhenaidah District, Bangladesh. It is situated 100 meters south of Taherpur Road in Barobazar Union, Kaliganj Upazila.

== History ==
In 1993–94, the Department of Archaeology (Bangladesh) conducted excavations at this site and discovered the remains of an ancient mosque. The mosque's domes were completely destroyed, with only the surrounding walls standing a few feet high. Archaeologists estimate that the mosque was built in the 15th century.

=== Etymology ===
Next to the mound is a large pond called Pirpukur. The mound is named after this pond, and the mosque adjacent to it is known as Pirpukur Mosque.

== Description ==
The Pirpukur Mound is rectangular, measuring 30 meters north–south and 19 meters east–west. The mound reaches a maximum height of 2 meters above the surrounding ground. To the west of the mound is a rectangular mosque, 18.40 meters long north–south and 10.85 meters wide east–west, with walls 1.40 meters thick and a height of 4.3 meters from the ground. The mosque has 15 domes and is made of red bricks, with a variety of brick types. The brick pillars are square, and the corners are rounded. Inside the mosque, there are 12 columns. The central mihrab on the western wall has a stairway of 12 steps and a height of 1.83 meters. The mosque originally had octagonal towers at its four corners, with bases connected to the ground. On the north side, there were two arched entrances, one of which is now destroyed. On the south side, a triangular-shaped window remains. In front of the mosque is the Pirpukur pond, and on either side are two graveyards.

== Gallery ==
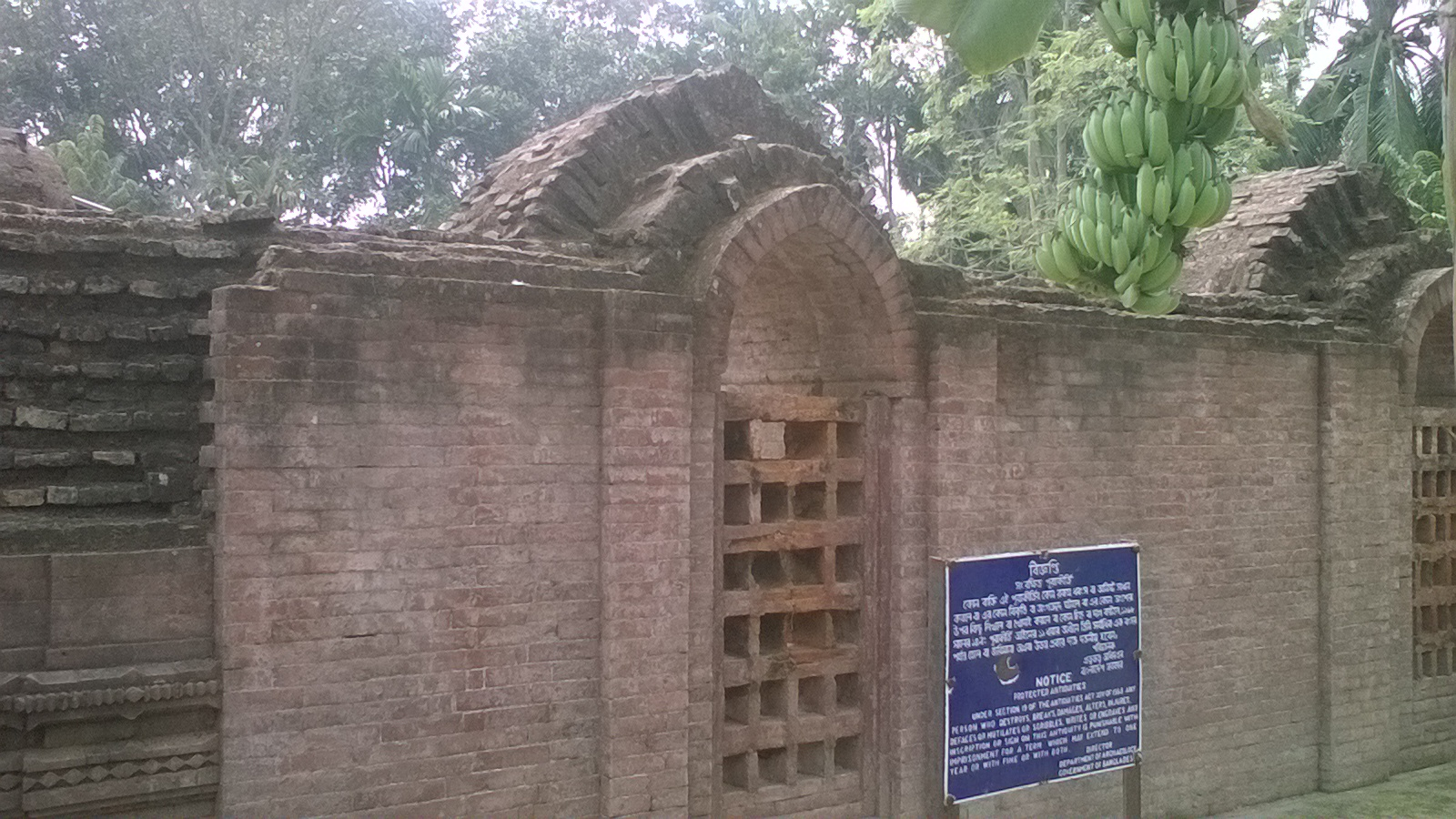
Pirpukur Jame Mosque

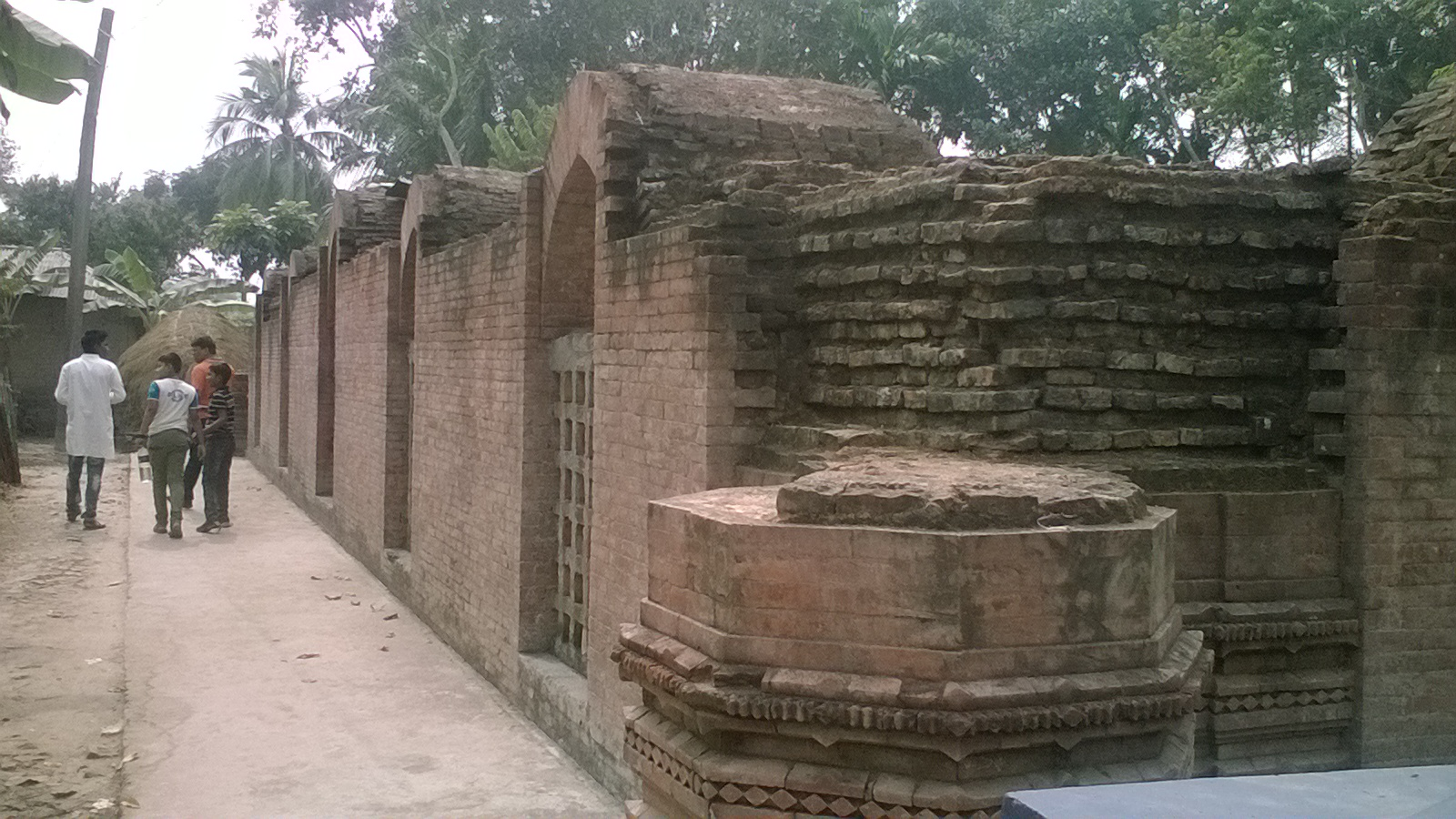
Mosque in ruins

== See also ==
- List of archaeological sites in Bangladesh
