= Md. Abu Talib =

Bangladeshi politician

Member of Parliament
- Incumbent
- Assumed office 17 February 2026
- Preceded by: Anwarul Azim
- Constituency: Jhenaidah-4

Personal details
- Born: March 1, 1969 Kaliganj, Jhenaidah, East Pakistan
- Citizenship: Bangladesh
- Party: Bangladesh Jamaat-e-Islami
- Domestic partner: Nargis

Md. Abu Talib is a politician of Bangladesh Jamaat-e-Islami and an incumbent MP from the Jhenaidah-4 constituency.
