= Shahiduzzaman Beltu =

Bangladeshi politician

- শহিদুজ্জামান বেল্টু

Member of Parliament
- In office 20 March 1991 – 29 October 2006
- Preceded by: Noor Uddin
- Succeeded by: Abdul Mannan
- Constituency: Jhenaidah-4

Personal details
- Born: Jhenaidah, British India
- Died: 28 October 2024 Jhenaidah Sadar Hospital
- Party: Bangladesh Nationalist Party (until 2008)

Shahiduzzaman Beltu is a Bangladesh Nationalist Party politician and a former member of parliament for Jhenaidah-4.

== Career ==
Beltu was elected to parliament from Jhenaidah-4 as a Bangladesh Nationalist Party candidate in 1991, 1996, and 2001. In 2005, he headed a subcommittee of the parliamentary standing committee on LGRD ministry affairs, that investigated former acting chief engineer Fariduddin Ahmed of the Department of Public Health Engineering. In 2008, he was expelled from Bangladesh Nationalist Party.
