= Abdus Sattar (Jhenaidah politician) =

Bangladeshi politician

Abdus Sawar

Member of Bangladesh Parliament
- In office 1986–1988
- Succeeded by: Noor Uddin

Personal details
- Party: Jatiya Party (Ershad)

Abdus Sawar is a Jatiya Party (Ershad) politician and a former member of parliament for Jhenaidah-4.

== Career ==
Sawar was elected to parliament from Jhenaidah-4 as a Jatiya Party candidate in 1986.
