= Noor Uddin (politician) =

Bangladeshi politician

- নুর উদ্দিন

Member of Parliament for Jhenaidah-4
- In office 1988–1990
- Preceded by: Abdus Sattar
- Succeeded by: Shahiduzzaman Beltu

Personal details
- Born: Jhenaidah District
- Party: Jatiya Party

Noor Uddin is a politician of Jhenaidah District of Bangladesh and a former member of parliament for the Jhenaidah-4 constituency in 1988.

== Career ==
Noor Uddin is the president of Jhenaidah District Jatiya Party. He was elected to parliament from Jhenaidah-4 constituency in as an independent candidate in 1988 Bangladeshi general election. He was defeated from Jhenaidah-4 constituency as an independent candidate in the fifth parliamentary elections of 1991.
