= Abdul Mannan (Bangladeshi politician, born 1952) =

Bangladeshi politician

- আব্দুল মান্নান

Member of Bangladesh Parliament
- In office 2008–2014
- Preceded by: Shahiduzzaman Beltu
- Succeeded by: Anwarul Azim Anar

Personal details
- Born: 12 March 1952 Jhenaidah District
- Died: 13 July 2021 (aged 69)
- Party: Bangladesh Awami League

Abdul Mannan (12 March 1952 – 13 July 2021) is a Bangladesh Awami League politician and a former member of parliament for Jhenaidah-4.

== Birth and early life ==
Abdul Mannan was born Jhenaidah District in 1952.

== Career ==
Mannan was elected to parliament from Jhenaidah-4 as a Bangladesh Awami League candidate in 2008. He is the president of the Kaliganj Upazila unit of the Bangladesh Awami League.
