= Galakata Mosque =

Mosque and archeological site in Jhenaidah, Bangladesh

- গলাকাটা মসজিদ
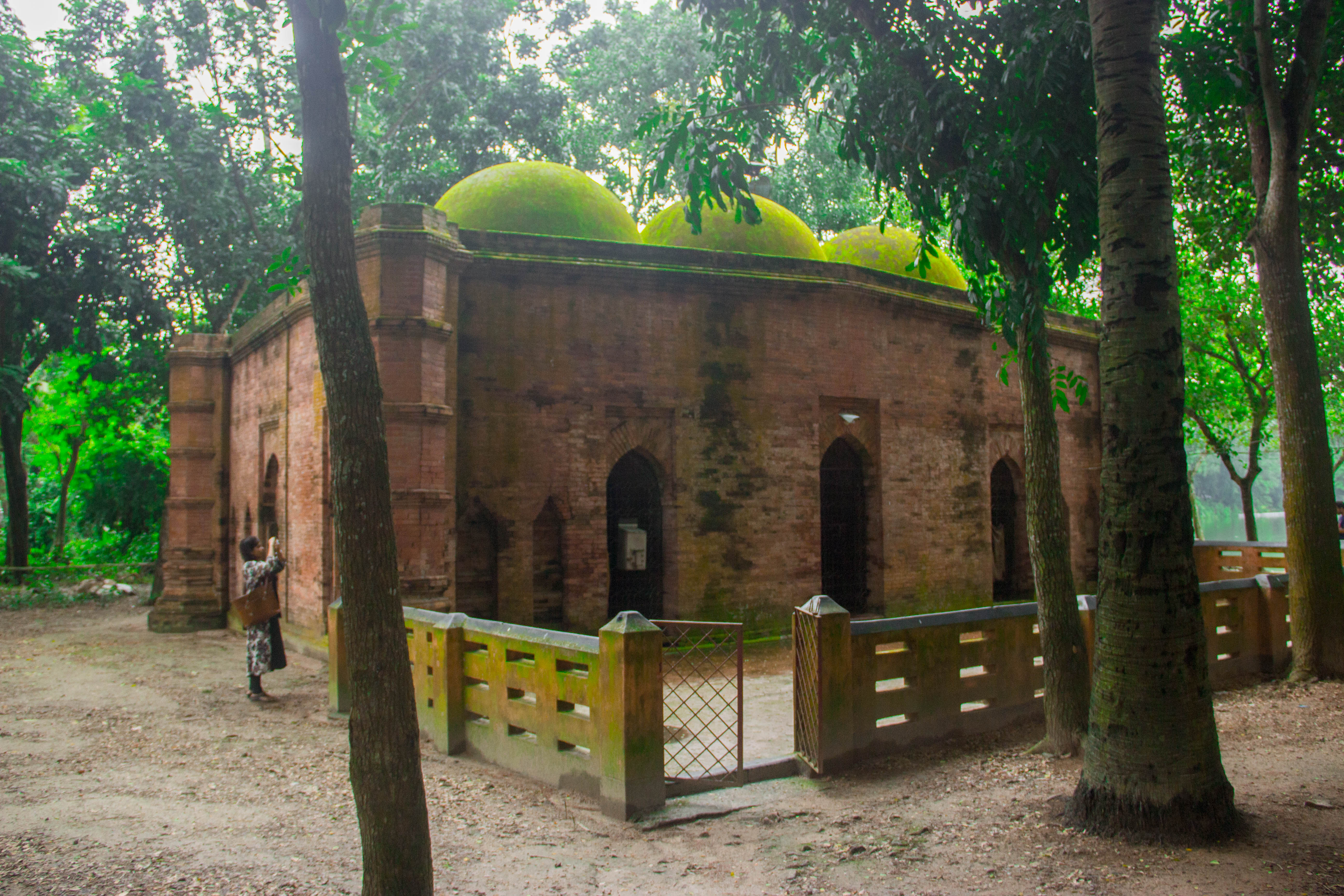

- Location within Bangladesh

Religion
- Affiliation: Islam
- Status: Active

Location
- Location: Barobazar-Tahirpara Road, Kaliganj Upazilla Jhenaidah District, Khulna Division
- Country: Bangladesh
- Administration: Department of Archeology
- Coordinates: 23.305751°N 89.138573°E

Architecture
- Type: Mosque architecture
- Style: Bengal Sultanate
- Established: Mid 15th century

Specifications
- Length: 11.83 m (38.8 ft)
- Width: 8.22 m (27.0 ft)
- Dome: 6
- Materials: Brick, Stone

The Galakata Mosque (Bengali: গলাকাটা মসজিদ) is a historical Sultanate period mosque located 100 meters east of Jorbangla Mosque at the village of Barobazar, in Jhenaidah District. It is a part of the historic site of the mosque city of Mohammadabad.

The name (Bengali: গলাকাটা, romanized: galakata, lit. 'beheaded') might have been derived from the mosque's earlier ruined state. The ruins was excavated in 1992-1993 and completely rebuilt with six domes in Khan Jahan style. Arabic and Persian remainings date the mosque to c. 800 AH, during Mahmud Shah's reign.

== Architecture ==
This mosque conforms to the typical oblong enclosed mosques in Bengal built during the early Islamic period and is assumed to be built in late-ourteenth or mid-fifteenth century, (Note: Perween Hasan dates the mosque to mid 15th century. Abu Sayeed M Ahmed dates to early 15th or late 14th century) measures 5.98 by 9.25 m (19.6 by 30.3 ft) internally with 1.34 m (4.4 ft) thick walls. It is a rectangular structure featuring engaged hexagonal corner towers on circular bases, which have been reconstructed.

The mosque has three entrances. The interior is divided by two stone columns into two bays and three aisles, forming six square bays, each covered by a dome. The east wall has three entrances, the central one being the largest at 1.13 m (3.7 ft) wide, flanked by two 97 cm wide entrances. Opposite these, three semicircular mihrabs are set in the west wall. The north and south walls each have two 1.12 m (3.7 ft) wide entrances, blocked with brick jalis.

The stone columns have square bases with carved merlons, transitioning to octagonal sections with decorative triangles, and dodecagonal main shafts adorned with chain and bell motifs. The mihrabs feature rectangular frames with merlons; the central mihrab includes terracotta lotus scroll decoration and a hanging motif in the niche. Side mihrabs have mesh frames with niches decorated by alternating four-leafed and plain bands.

== Gallery ==
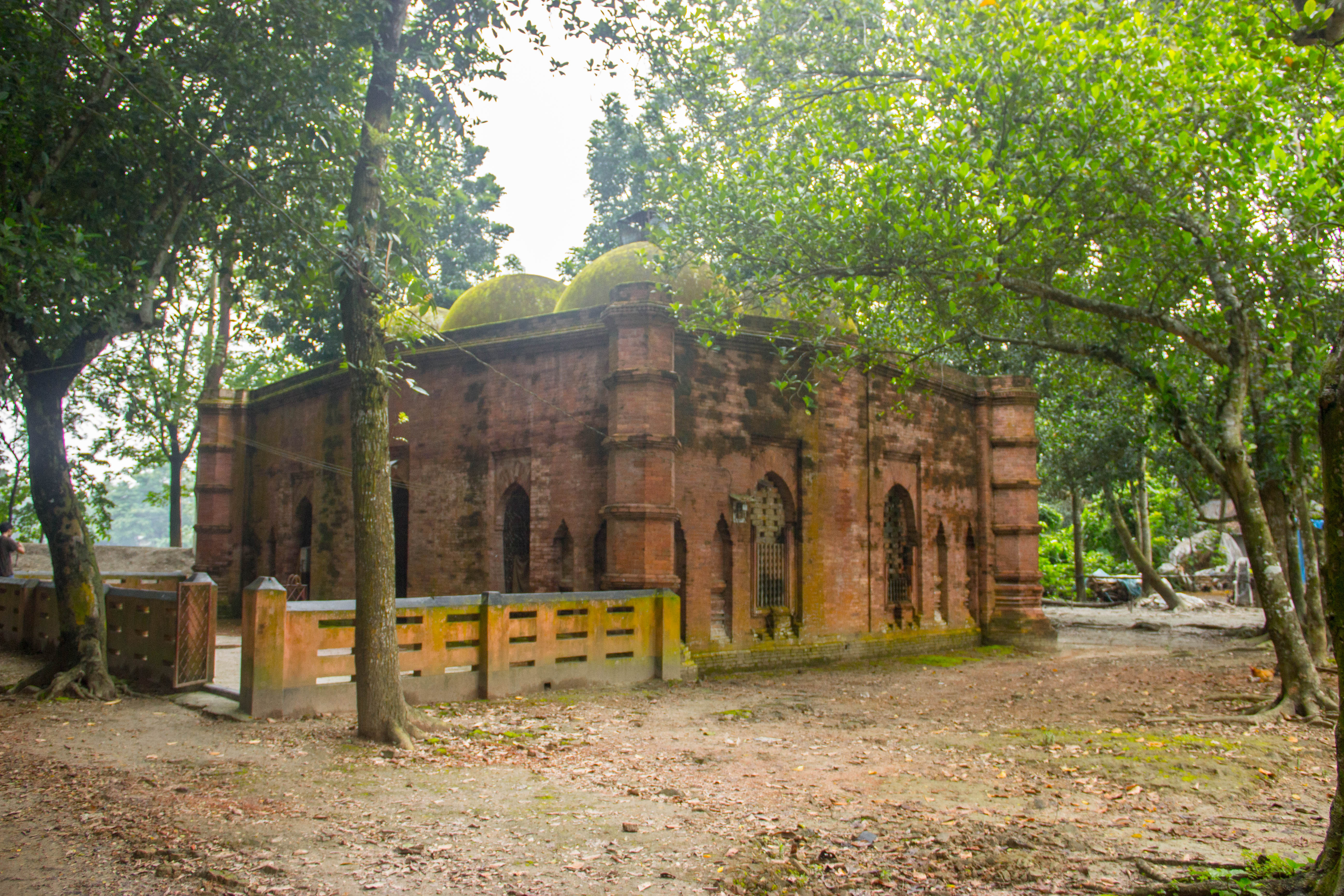
View from the eastern corner

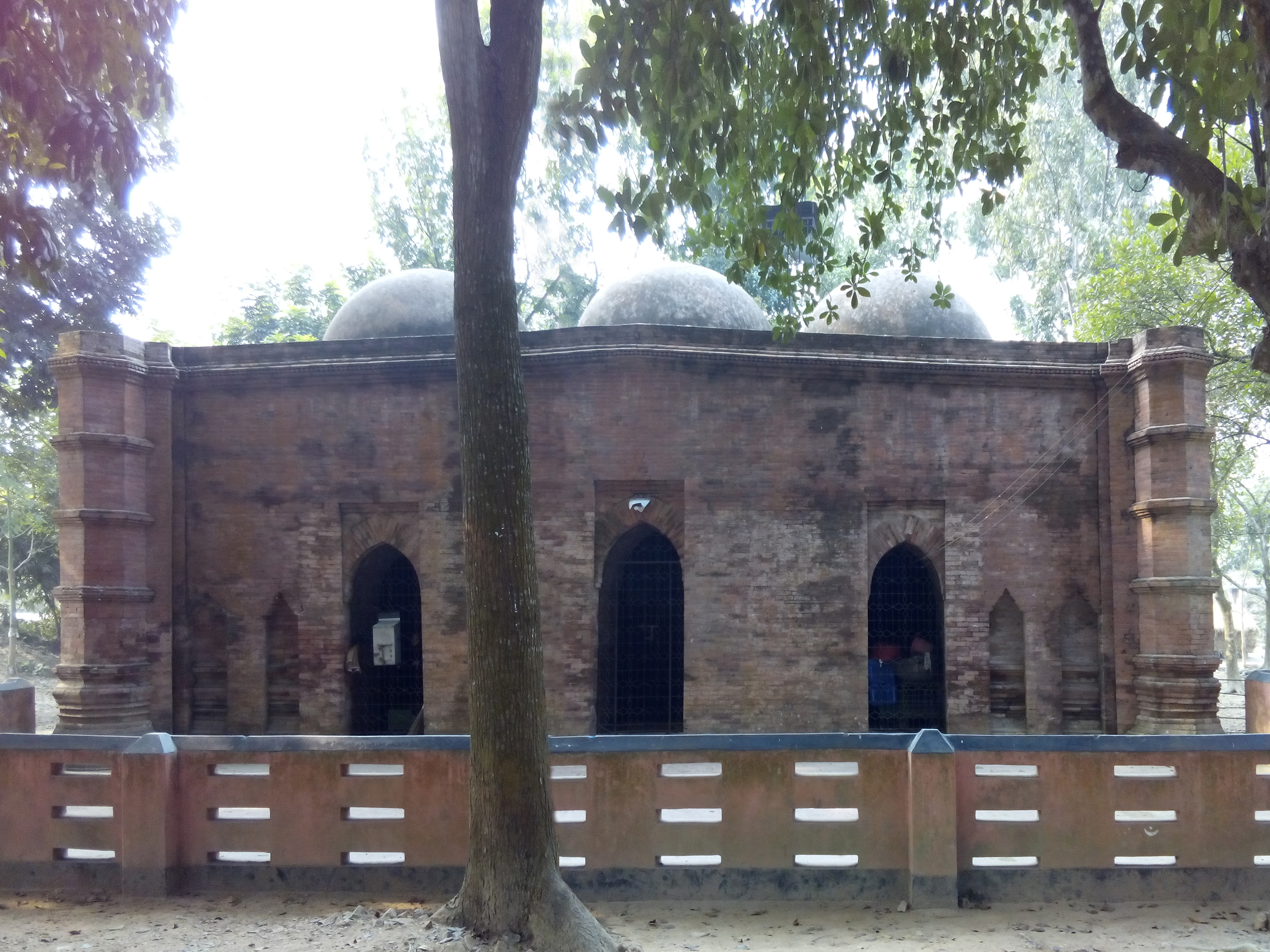
Façade of the mosque

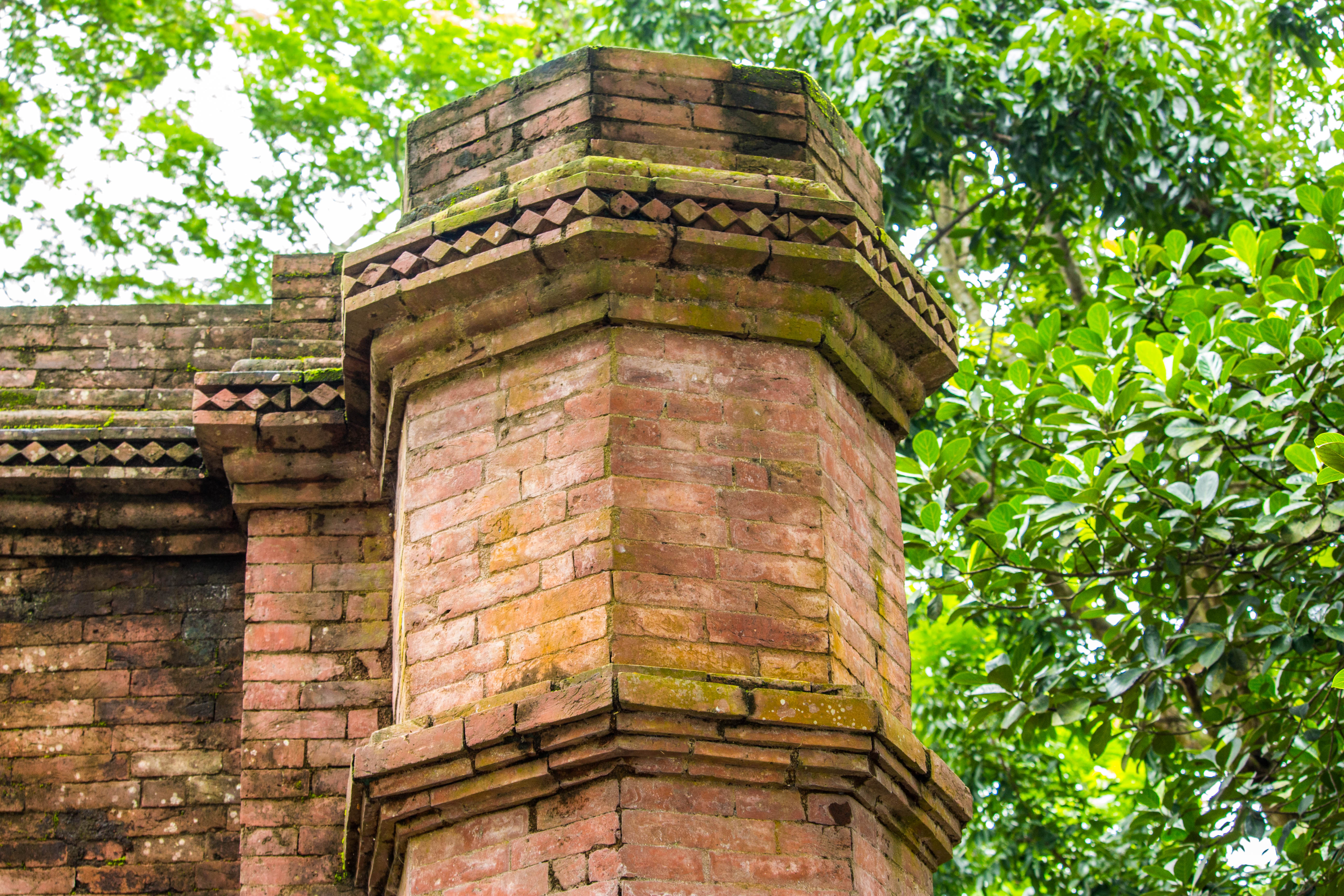
Mosque hexagonal turret of the mosque works as minaret

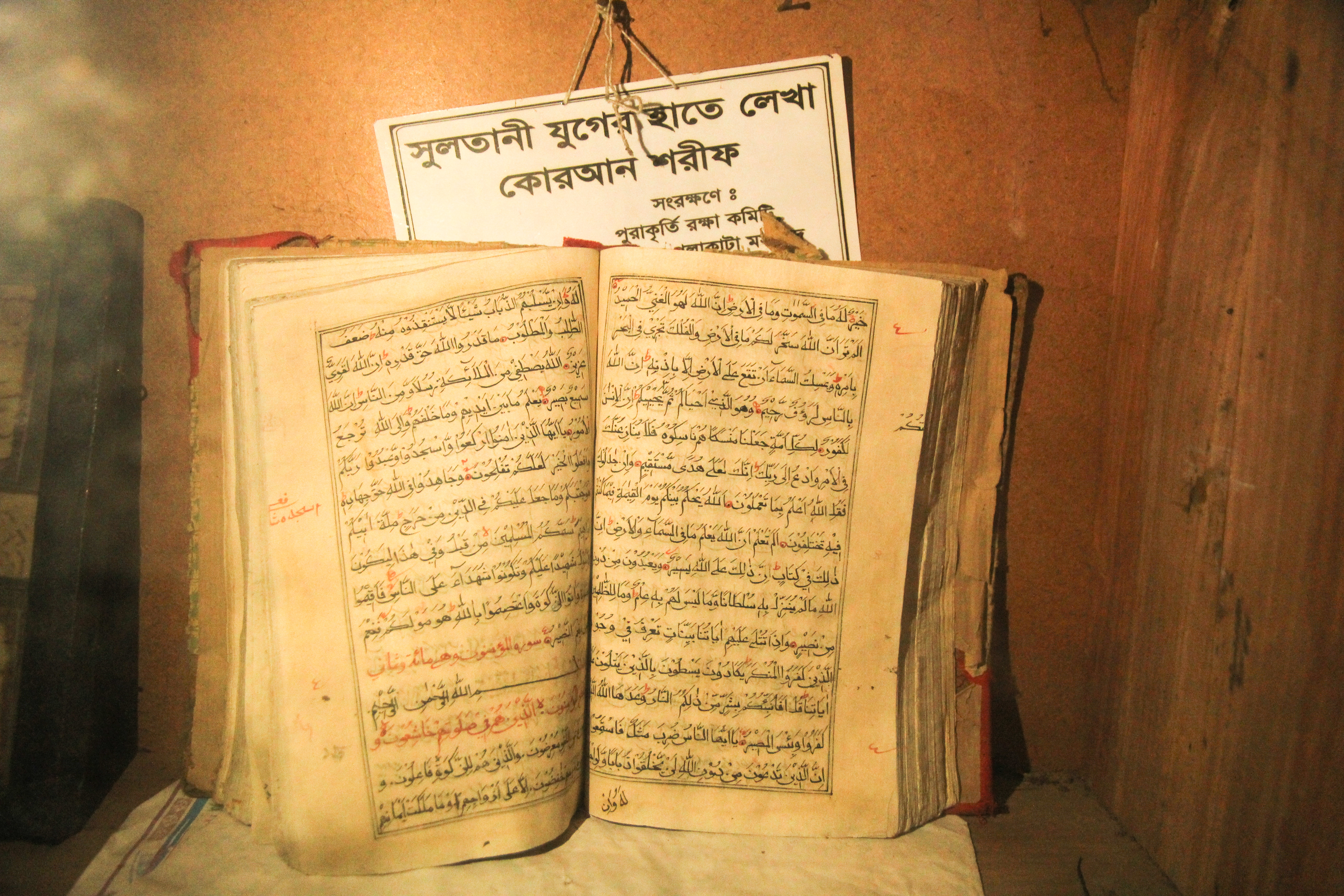
Bengal Sultanate era copy of al-Quran preserved at the mosque

== See also ==
- Noongola Mosque
- List of Mosques in Bangladesh

== Bibliography ==
- Hasan, Perween (2007). Sultans and Mosques: The Early Muslim Architecture of Bangladesh. Bloomsbury Academic. ISBN 978-1-84511-381-0.
- Ahmed, Abu Sayeed M. (2006). Mosque Architecture in Bangladesh. UNESCO Dhaka. ISBN 978-984-32-3469-8.
