= Nazrul Islam Ritu =

Bangladeshi politician

- নজরুল ইসলাম রিতু
- Born: Trilochanpur, Bangladesh
- Occupation: Politician

Nazrul Islam Ritu (Bengali: নজরুল ইসলাম রিতু) is a Bangladeshi activist and politician. She (Note: Sources state that Ritu uses "female and male pronouns", but mostly use she/her pronouns when describing her. This article uses she/her for consistency.) is the first hijra (third gender) elected union parishad chairperson in Bangladesh. She lives in Trilochanpur, Jhenaidah District.

== Life and career ==
Nazrul Islam Ritu was born in Trilochanpur, but had to flee when she was five years old and took refuge in a transgender commune located in Demra Thana, Dhaka. In her late twenties, she returned to Trilochanpur and became known for her charity and assistance, notably by donating to a number of local Hindu temples and helping with the construction of two new mosques. Ritu started her political career in 2020 from Jhenaidah district, and promised to "eradicate corruption and uproot the drug menace". She ran as an independent in the elections and won against her opponent, Nazrul Islam Sana, who was supported by the ruling Awami League, with an over 2:1 vote ratio.
