= Md. Anwarul Azim Anar =

Bangladeshi politician (1968–2024)

- মোঃ আনোয়ারুল আজীম আনার

Member of the Bangladesh Parliament for Jhenaidah-4
- In office 29 January 2014 – 13 May 2024
- Preceded by: Abdul Mannan
- Succeeded by: Md. Abu Taleb

Personal details
- Born: 3 January 1968 Jhenaidah, Khulna Division, East Pakistan, Pakistan
- Died: 13 May 2024 (aged 56) (death disclosed) Kolkata, West Bengal, India
- Party: Bangladesh Awami League

Md. Anwarul Azim Anar (3 January 1968 – 13 May 2024) was a Bangladeshi Awami League politician and a three-term Jatiya Sangsad member representing the Jhenaidah-4 constituency from 2014 until his death in 2024.

== Career ==
Anar allegedly got involved in the drug trade around 1986 when the Jatiya Party was in power. He used to smuggle goods through the Baghda border in India to the Baghavanga border in Bangladesh.

In 1991, Anar allegedly got involved in gold smuggling along with Paritosh Tagore, another smuggler from Jhenaidah. In 1996, he was involved in arms smuggling.

In 2007, Interpol had issued a Red Notice against Anar for his connection with multiple criminal cases including arms and explosives.

Anar was also accused in a murder case. A special court in Chuadanga issued a public notice in 2009 to arrest Anar. In 2012, on the recommendation of the Ministry of Home Affairs, he was acquitted from the case due to political considerations.

Anar was first elected to the parliament on 5 January 2014 representing the Jhenaidah-4 constituency as an Awami League candidate. At the time of the election he had 21 cases against him. He received 103,478 votes while his nearest competitor, Mohammad Mostafa Alamgir of the Bangladesh Workers Party, received 5,398. He was nominated instead of his predecessor, Abdul Mannan, who was also a same party member. He served as a member of the Parliamentary Standing Committee on the Ministry of Shipping.

Anar was re-elected to the parliament in 2018 Bangladeshi general election retaining the same position. He received 226,396 while his nearest competitor, Md Saiful Islam Firoz of the Bangladesh Nationalist Party, got 9,506 votes. He was elected again in 2024 Bangladeshi general election. He was the president of the Kaliganj Upazila unit of Awami League.

== Personal life ==
Anar had a daughter, Mumtarin Ferdous Doreen.

== Disappearance and death ==
Anar went missing on 13 May 2024 after he had left the house of his Indian friend, Gopal Biswas, in North 24 Parganas, West Bengal, India. The government of Bangladesh sought the support of India in finding Anar. He had entered India on 12 May through Darshana-Gede border. On 22 May, Bangladesh Minister of Home Affairs, Asaduzzaman Khan, confirmed Anar's death, caused by murder in an apartment, where he went to meet a woman named Celesty Rahman in New Town, Kolkata. According to the investigations, he had been murdered on 13 May. Later on 28 May, investigators found 4 kg of human flesh in the septic tank of the New Town housing complex suspected to be of Anar's which was then sent for a forensic test.
