= Jhenaidah-4 =

Constituency of Bangladesh's Jatiya Sangsad

Coordinates: 23.42°N 89.14°E

- Constituency for the Jatiya Sangsad
- District: Jhenaidah District
- Division: Khulna Division
- Electorate: 333,464 (2026)

Current constituency
- Created: 1984
- Party: Bangladesh Jamaat-e-Islami
- Member: Md. Abu Talib
- ← 83 Jhenaidah-3 85 Jessore-1 →

Jhenaidah-4 is a constituency represented in the Jatiya Sangsad (National Parliament) of Bangladesh since 2026 by Md. Abu Talib of the Bangladesh Jamaat-e-Islami.

== Boundaries ==
The constituency encompasses Kaliganj Upazila and four union parishads of Jhenaidah Sadar Upazila: Fursandi, Ghorshal, Moharajpur, and Naldanga.

== History ==
The constituency was created in 1984 from the Jessore-3 constituency when the former Jessore District was split into four districts: Jhenaidah, Jessore, Magura, and Narail.

== Members of Parliament ==
Election	Member	Party
1986	Abdus Sattar	Jatiya Party
1988	Noor Uddin	Independent
1991	Shahiduzzaman Beltu	Bangladesh Nationalist Party
Feb 1996	Shahiduzzaman Beltu	Bangladesh Nationalist Party
Jun 1996	Shahiduzzaman Beltu	Bangladesh Nationalist Party
2001	Shahiduzzaman Beltu	Bangladesh Nationalist Party
2008	Abdul Mannan	Awami League
2014	Anwarul Azim Anar	Awami League
2018	Anwarul Azim Anar	Awami League
2024	Anwarul Azim Anar	Awami League
2026	Md. Abu Talib	Bangladesh Jamaat-e-Islami

== Elections ==
=== Elections in the 2020s ===
General Election 2026: Jhenaidah-4
Party	Candidate	Votes	%	±%
Jamaat	Md. Abu Talib	105,999	43.4	N/A
Independent	Md. Saiful Islam Firoz	77,104	31.6	N/A
BNP	Md. Rashed Khan	56,244	23.0	N/A
IAB	Abdul Jalil	3,907	1.6	N/A
JP(E)	Emdadul Islam	613	0.3	N/A
Gano Forum	Khaniya Khanam	267	0.1	N/A
Majority		28,895	11.8	N/A
Turnout		244,134	73.2	N/A
Registered electors		333,464		
Jamaat gain from AL				

=== Elections in the 2010s ===
General Election 2014: Jhenaidah-4
Party	Candidate	Votes	%	±%
AL	Anwarul Azim Anar	103,478	95.0	+44.1
WPB	Mohammad Mostafa Alamgir	5,398	5.0	N/A
Majority		98,080	90.1	+87.9
Turnout		108,876	43.1	−48.5
AL hold				

=== Elections in the 2000s ===
General Election 2008: Jhenaidah-4
Party	Candidate	Votes	%	±%
AL	Abdul Mannan	105,852	50.9	+8.0
BNP	Shahiduzzaman Beltu	101,175	48.7	−6.6
BRWP	Abdus Salam	386	0.2	N/A
National People's Party	Md. Kamrul Hasan	269	0.1	N/A
United Citizen Movement	Noor Uddin Ahmed	235	0.1	N/A
Majority		4.677	2.2	−10.2
Turnout		207,917	91.6	+6.3
AL gain from BNP				

General Election 2001: Jhenaidah-4
Party	Candidate	Votes	%	±%
BNP	Shahiduzzaman Beltu	95,991	55.3	+9.5
AL	Md. Abdul Mannan Mia	74,458	42.9	+5.5
IJOF	Md. Shahjahan Ali	2,467	1.4	N/A
WPB	Md. A. Salam	394	0.2	−0.4
Independent	Golam Morshed	137	0.1	N/A
Majority		21,533	12.4	+4.0
Turnout		173,447	85.3	+4.5
BNP hold				

=== Elections in the 1990s ===
General Election June 1996: Jhenaidah-4
Party	Candidate	Votes	%	±%
BNP	Shahiduzzaman Beltu	60,696	45.8	+8.3
AL	Abdul Mannan	49,605	37.4	+9.2
Jamaat	Md. Abu Taleb	20,106	15.2	−2.6
JP(E)	Md. Jahidul Islam	1,311	1.0	N/A
WPB	Abdus Salam	851	0.6	−0.8
Majority		11,091	8.4	−0.9
Turnout		132,569	80.8	+11.6
BNP hold				

General Election 1991: Jhenaidah-4
Party	Candidate	Votes	%	±%
BNP	Shahiduzzaman Beltu	41,971	37.5	
AL	Shah Md. Zahangir Shikder	31,553	28.2	
Jamaat	Nazrul Islam	19,944	17.8	
Independent	Mohammad Ebadot Hossain Mondal	12,090	10.8	
IOJ	Rostam Ali	1,842	1.6	
WPB	Abdus Salam	1,536	1.4	
Independent	Noor Uddin Ahmed	1,451	1.3	
Zaker Party	Darbesh Ali Laskar	1,187	1.1	
Jatiya Samajtantrik Dal-JSD	Abdur Razzak	274	0.2	
Majority		10,418	9.3	
Turnout		111,848	69.2	
BNP gain from				
