= Trilochanpur Union =

Trilochanpur Union ত্রিলোচনপুর ইউনিয়ন
- Union
- Trilochanpur Union
- Location within Bangladesh
- Coordinates: 23.3784°N 89.0749°E
- Country: Bangladesh
- Division: Khulna
- District: Jhenaidah
- Upazila: Kaliganj

Area
  - Total: 54.13 km^{2} (20.90 sq mi)

Population (2001)
  - Total: 13,377
  - Density: 247.1/km^{2} (640.1/sq mi)
- Time zone: UTC+6 (BST)
- Website: trilochanpurup.jhenaidah.gov.bd

Trilochanpur Union (Bengali: ত্রিলোচনপুর ইউনিয়ন) is a union parishad of Kaliganj Upazila, Jhenaidah District, Khulna Division, Bangladesh. The union has an area of 54.13 square kilometres (20.90 sq mi) and as of 2001 had a population of 13,377. There are 20 villages and 18 mouzas in the union.
