= Kaliganj Upazila, Jhenaidah =

Upazila in Jhenaidah, Khulna, Bangladesh

Kaliganj কালীগঞ্জ
- Upazila
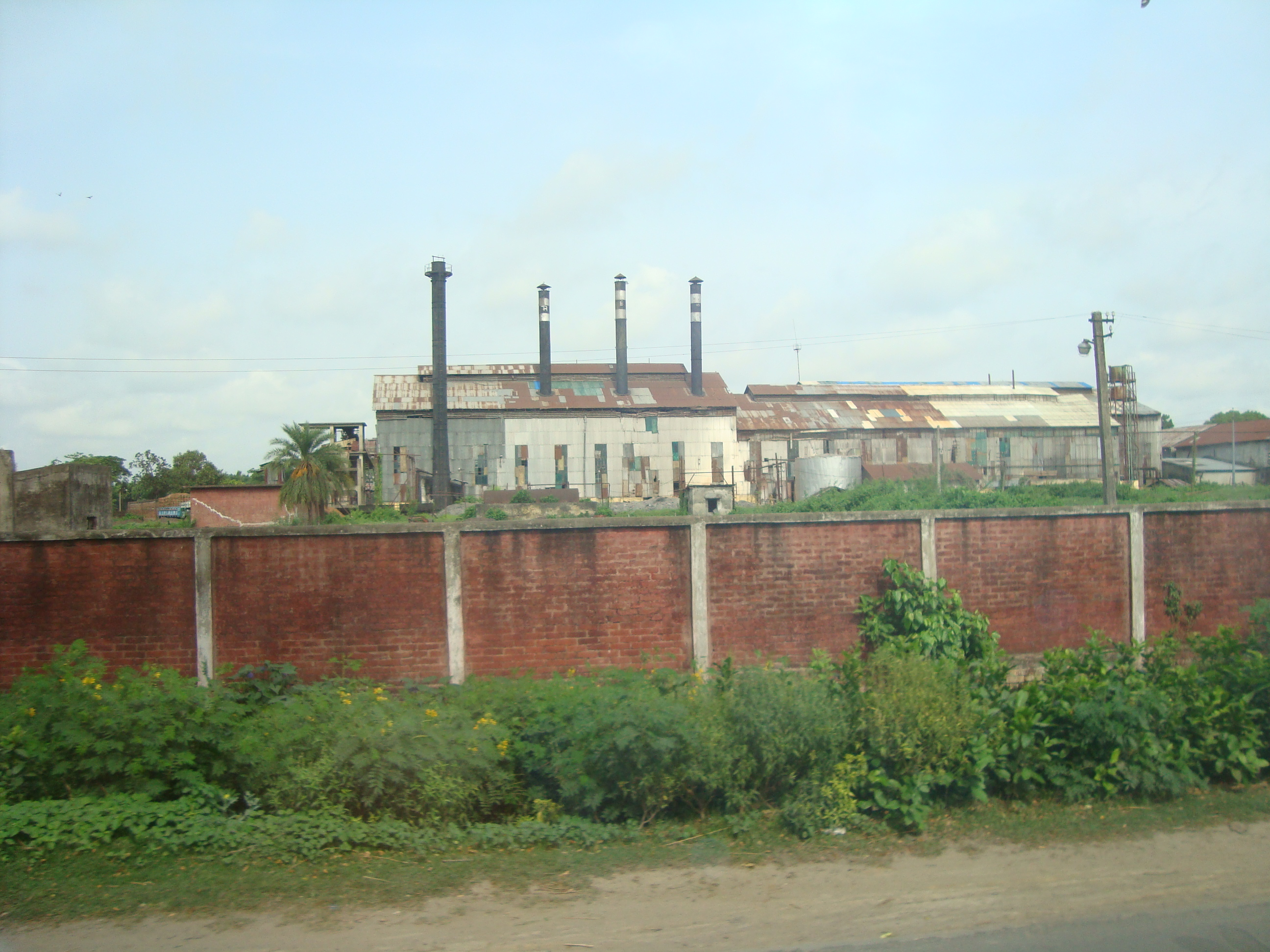
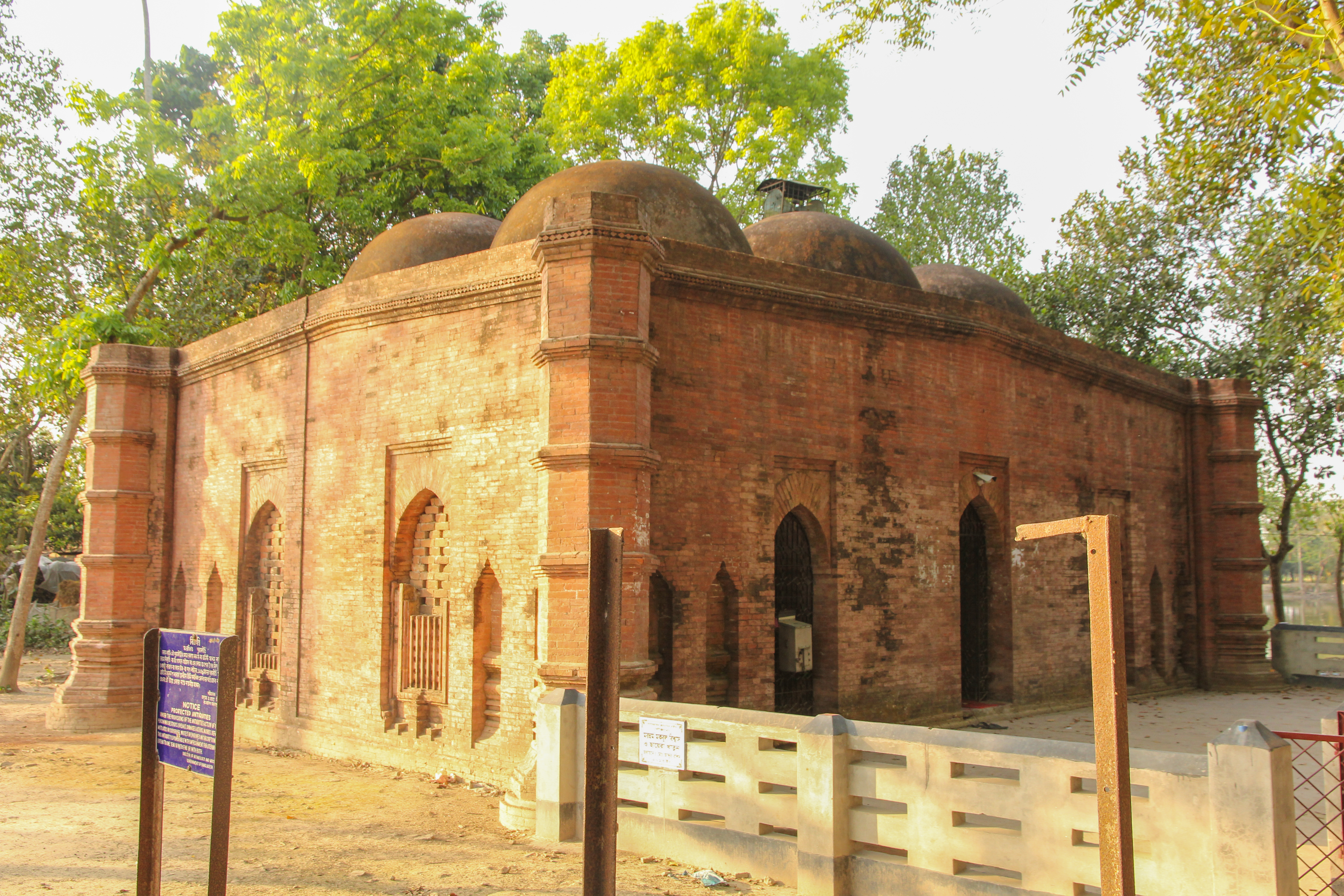
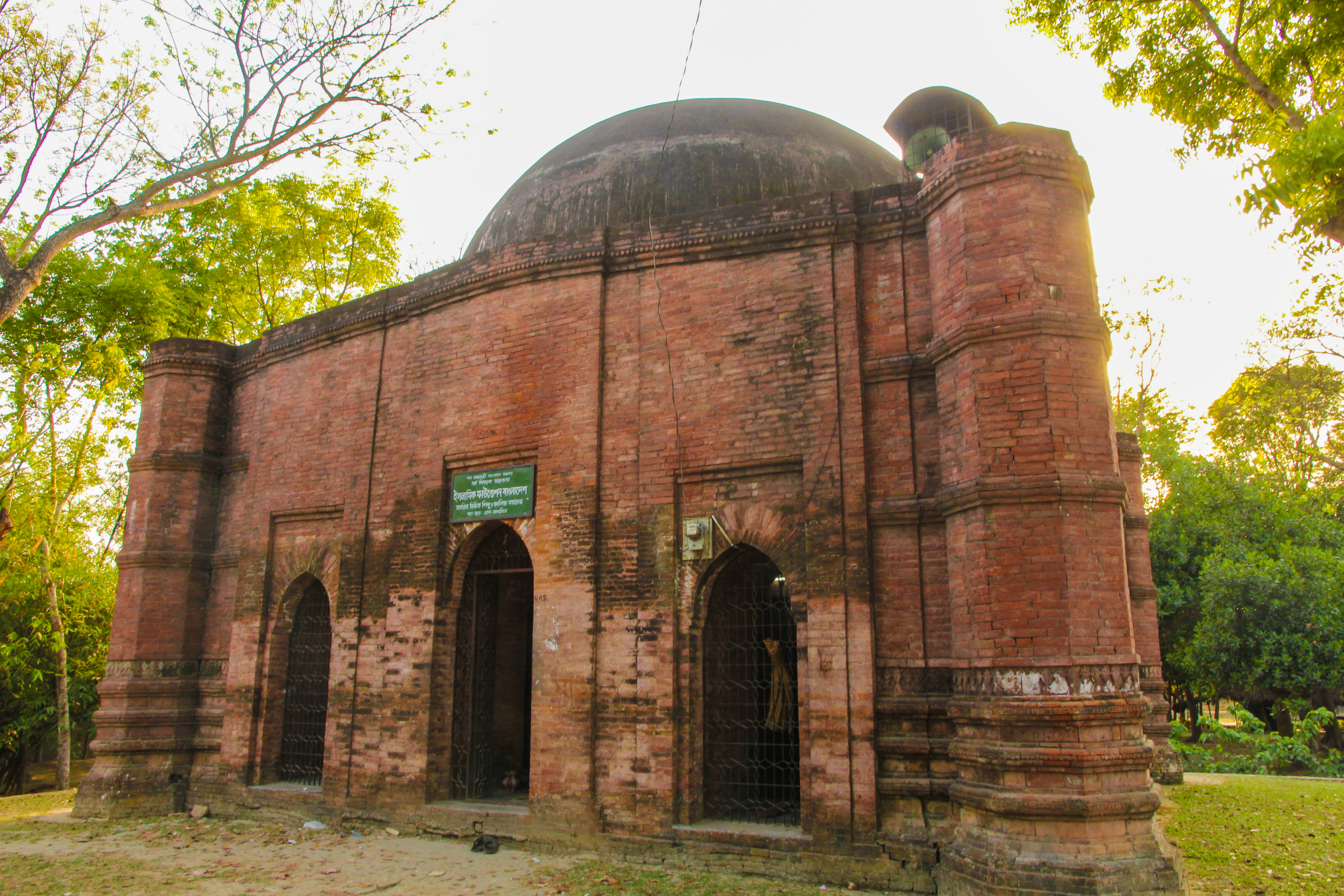
- Clockwise: Mobarakganj Sugar Mills Ltd., Galakata Masjid, Jorbangla Mosque

- Coordinates: 23°24′50″N 89°8′0″E
- Country: Bangladesh
- Division: Khulna
- District: Jhenaidah

Area
  - Total: 310.19 km^{2} (119.77 sq mi)

Population (2022)
  - Total: 308,504
  - Density: 994.56/km^{2} (2,575.9/sq mi)
- Time zone: UTC+6 (BST)
- Postal code: 7350
- Website: kaliganj.jhenaidah.gov.bd

Kaliganj (Bengali: কালীগঞ্জ) is an upazila of Jhenaidah District in the Division of the Khulna, Bangladesh.

One of the most important commercial area is Kaliganj under Khulna Division. It crosses between Dhaka-Khulna Highway. It has the myth of Gazi Kalu Champabati, The historical mosques of Barobazar, the largest banyan tree in Asia and the flow of Chitra and Begobati.

== Geography ==
Bethuli, Kaliganj is located at 23.4139°N 89.1333°E. It has 67,841 households and a total area of 310.19 km^{2}. Main rivers are Chittra, Bhairab, Begabati. It is bounded by Jhenaidah Sadar on the north, Jessore district on the south, Kotchandpur Upazilla in the west and Magura district in the east.

== Demographics ==
Religions in Kaliganj Upazila (2022)
Religion	Percent
Islam	85.47%
Hinduism	14.30%
Other or not stated	0.23%

According to the 2022 Bangladeshi census, Kaliganj Upazila had 80,721 households and a population of 308,504. 8.22% of the population were under 5 years of age. Kaliganj had a literacy rate (age 7 and over) of 74.82%: 77.34% for males and 72.37% for females, and a sex ratio of 98.34 males for every 100 females. 69,067 (22.39%) lived in urban areas.

As of the 2011 Census of Bangladesh, Kaliganj upazila had 67,841 households and a population of 282,366. 56,280 (19.93%) were under 10 years of age. Kaliganj had an average literacy rate of 51.97%, compared to the national average of 51.8%, and a sex ratio of 999 females per 1000 males. 45,341 (16.06%) of the population lived in urban areas.

As of the 1991 Bangladesh census, Kaliganj had a population of 219,126. Males constituted 51.76% of the population, and females 48.24%. The population aged 18 or older was 112,587. Kaliganj has an average literacy rate of 29.7% (7+ years), compared to the national average of 32.4%.

== Economy ==
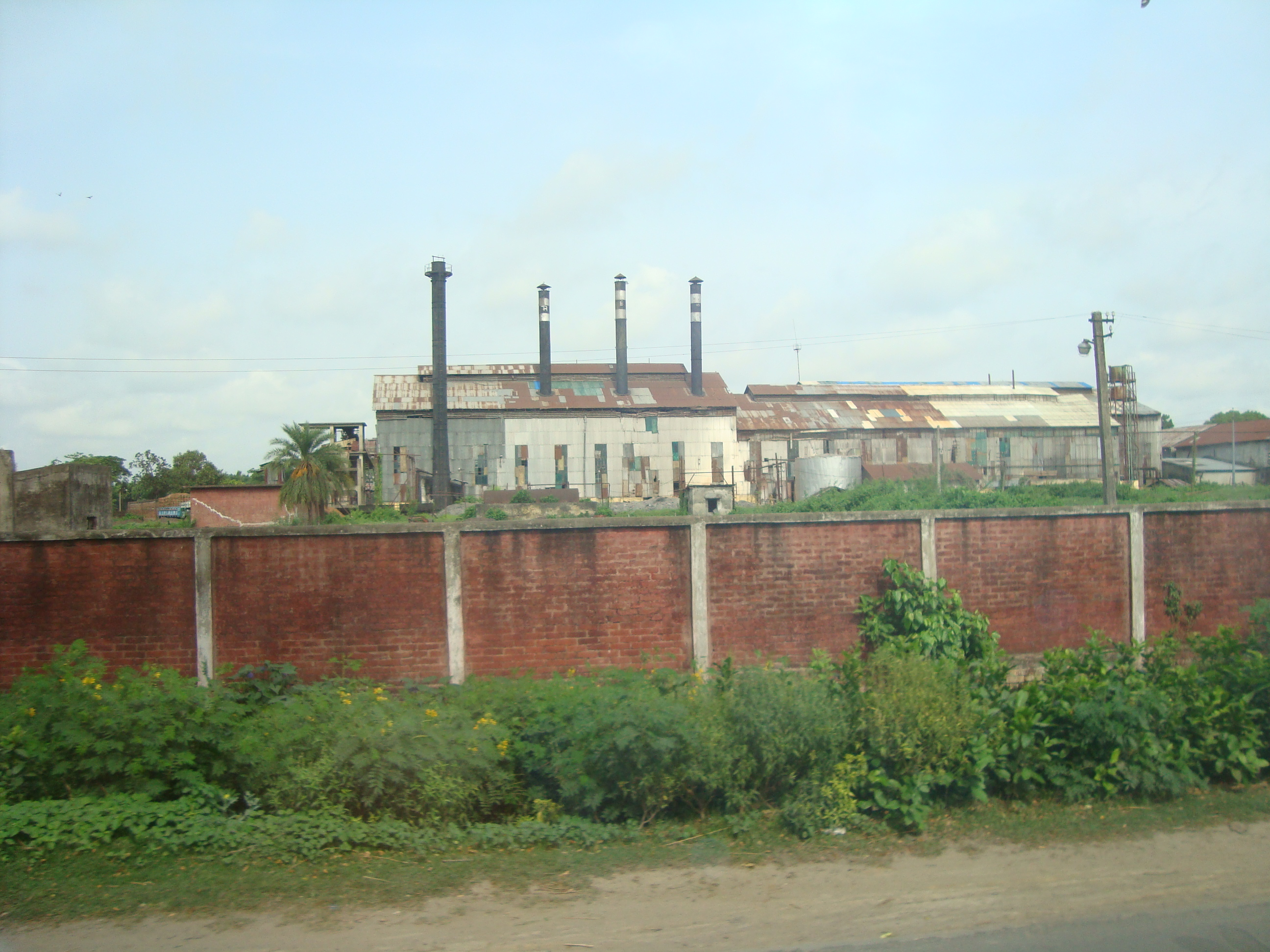
Mobarakganj Sugar Mills Ltd.

- Mobarakganj Sugar Mills Limited
- Agriculture
- Hand-loom

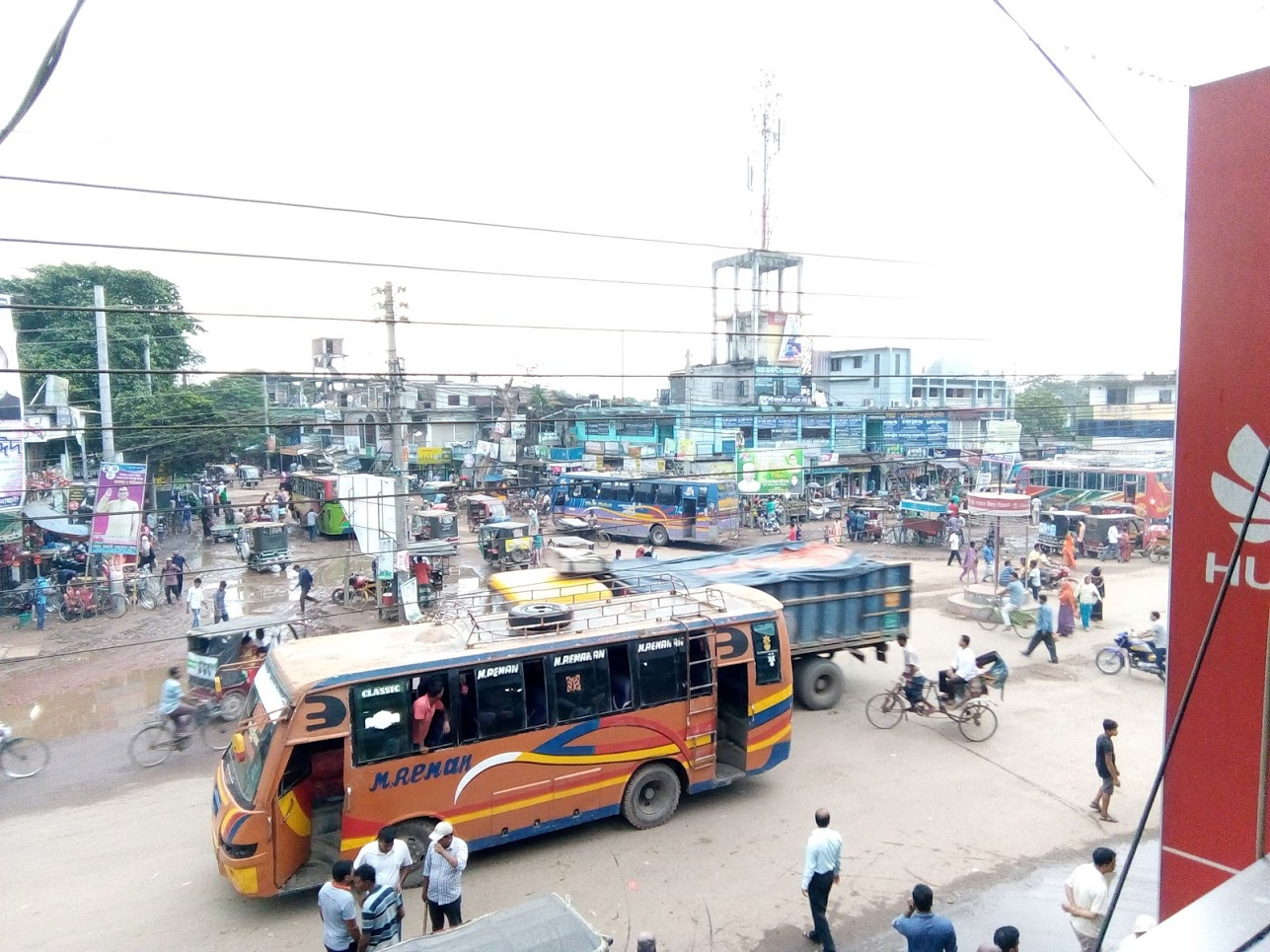
Kaliganj Main Bus Stand

- Cold storage
- Machineries
- Business

== Points of interest ==
- Naldanga Temple Complex:, in the Kaliganj Upazila, is a temple complex built in 1656 by Maharaj Indranarayan Debroy. There are a total of six temples now. The government restored all of them in 1980s but they were destroyed again during the 1992 riots and now most of them are in ruins. Renovations are still going on. The idol of goddess Kali was from Banaras, India.
- The biggest banyan tree in the world is situated at Mollikpur Village under Kaligonj Upazila.
- Baro Bazar: Gora Masjid, Sako Bazar Masjid and more than 10 other mosques notably Jorbangla and Galakata and more than 5 large dighi (reservoirs) are situated in Baro Bazar of Kaligonj.
- Bulu Deouan er Mazar is another remarkable place in Kaligonj Upazila.
- Kolika Doha is situated in Naldanga, 300 meter distance from Naldanga Temple Complex.
- The Gunjanath temple dates back to the 17th century, also in Kaliganj. It can be reached from Naldanga.
- Alaipur Mosque: A historical mosque has been discovered here in the previous decade.
- Baro bazar fish Market is one of biggest fish market in khulna division
- Sheikh russel mini stadium
- Mobarakganj Sugar Mills Limited
- Mobarakganj railway station

== Administration ==
Kaliganj Upazila is divided into Kaliganj Municipality and 11 union parishads: Bara Bazar, Jamal, Kashtabhanga, Kola, Maliat, Niamatpur, Roygram, Rakhalgachhi, Shimla Rokonpur, Sundarpur Durgapur, and Trilochanpur. The union parishads are subdivided into 188 mauzas and 198 villages.

Kaliganj Municipality is subdivided into 9 wards and 20 mahallas.

Kaliganj Upazila is encompassed by parliamentary constituency Jhenaidah-4.

Member of Parliament :

1. Md. Anwarul Azim Anar, MP (5 January 2014 –13 May 2024) in 10th General Election
2. Mr. Abdul Mannan, MP (2009–2014) in 9th General Election
3. Md.. Shahidul Islam Baltu, MP (1991–1996, February 1996 – June 1996, 1996–2001, 2001–2006) in 5th to 8th General Election

== Education ==
- Government Naldanga Bhushan Pilot Secondary School, Kaliganj was formed in 1882 by Raja Bahadur Pramatha Bhushan Deb Ray. It is one of the oldest and notable institutions of Bangladesh.
- G.K United high school.
- Pakh Sharif dakil Madrasa.
- Kastovanga girls high school.
- Gourinathpur govt.primary school.
- Baliadanga M.S Secondary School is one of the oldest high school of Kaliganj.
- Kolabazar Secondary High School, (Kolabazar, Kaliganj)
- Shaheed Noor Ali College
- Sait Baria Haqqul Huda Alim Madrasha
- Mahatab Uddin Degree College, Kaliganj
- Ramnagor College
- Rostom Ali High School, Roghunathpur.
- Solimunnesa Girls' High School, Kaliganj
- Chaprail High School, Kaliganj, Jhenaidah was formed in 1963.
- Mobarakganj Sugar Mills High School, Kaliganj, Jhenaidah
- Hat baro bazar high School, Barobazar
- BAROBAZAR COLLEGE, BAROBAZAR
- Hat Baro Bazar Girls school, Barobazar
- Gazir Hat High School (Gazir Hat, Kaliganj)
- Hasanhati Baro Dhopadi Ebadat Ali High School.
- Hasanhati Govt. Primary School.
- Gopalpur secondary high school, Gopalur
- Panchkahuni secondary High school, kaliganj
- Mongolpaita parkhidha collage, kaliganj
- Bejpara High School, Kaliganj
- Arpara sibnagar model government primary school, kaliganj
- Bhatghara-Doyapur government primary school, Bhatghara-Doyapur, kaliganj
- Naldanga Bushan shishu academy, Kaliganj
- Al-amin precadet school, Kaliganj
- Ashar Alo precadet school, Kaliganj
- Shaheen precadet school, Kaliganj
- Keyabagan hosnin adorsho college, Kaliganj
- Bhatghara high school, bhatghara, Kaliganj
- Shoiaibnagar fazil madrashah, Kaliganj
- Alhaz Amzad Ali Faizur Rahman Mohilla College, Kaliganj
- Kastovanga Government Primary School

== Notable people ==
- Qazi Mu'tasim Billah, Islamic scholar and professor
- Nazrul Islam Ritu, politician, was born in Trilochanpur.
