= Naldanga =

Naldanga নলডাঙ্গা
- Village
- Naldanga
- Location within Bangladesh
- Coordinates: 23°26′18″N 89°10′08″E
- Country: Bangladesh
- Division: Khulna
- District: Jhenaidah
- Upazila: Jhenaidah Sadar
- Time zone: UTC+6 (BST)
- Website: naldangaup.jhenaidah.gov.bd

Naldanga is a village in Jhenaidah Sadar Upazila, Jhenaidah District, Khulna Division, Bangladesh. It is known for its rural landscape and agricultural activities.

== Demographics ==
According to the 2011 Bangladesh Population Census, Naldanga falls under the Jhenaidah District's population statistics.

== Economy ==
The local economy of Naldanga is primarily based on agriculture. Farmers cultivate rice, jute, and vegetables, while small-scale businesses and local markets support the community.

== Education ==
Naldanga has several primary schools and madrasas. Secondary education is available in nearby towns within Jhenaidah Sadar Upazila.

== Transportation ==
The village is connected to Jhenaidah town through regional roads, allowing access to public transport, including buses and auto-rickshaws.
