= Jorbangla Mosque =

Mosque in Jhenaidah, Bangladesh

Jor Bangla Mosque
- জোড়বাংলা মসজিদ
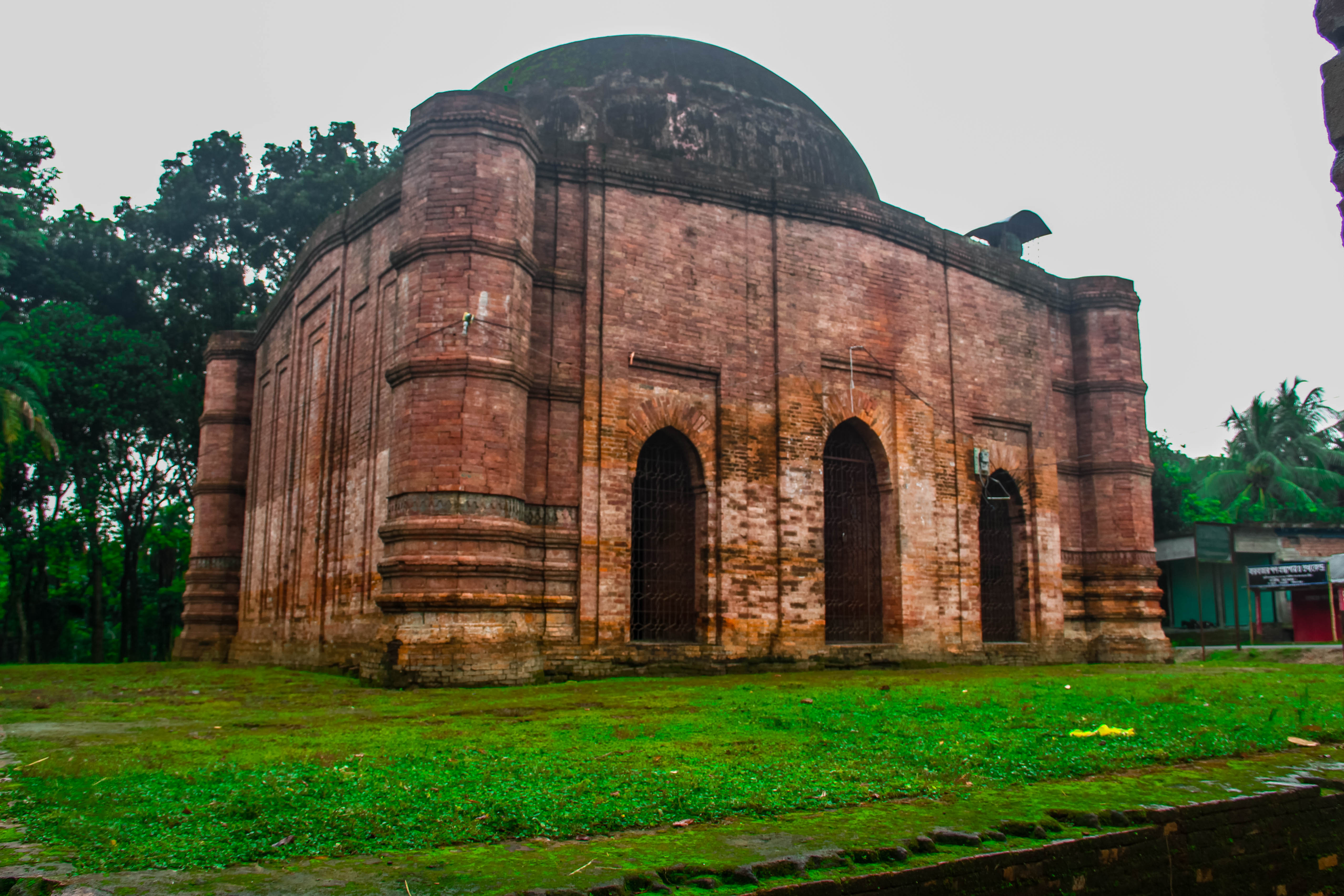

- Location within Bangladesh

Religion
- Affiliation: Islam
- Status: Active

Location
- Location: Kaliganj Upazila, Jhenaidah District, Bangladesh
- Interactive map of Jor Bangla Mosque
- Administration: Department of Archeology
- Coordinates: 23.3058°N 89.1365°E

Architecture
- Type: Mosque architecture
- Style: Bengal Sultanate
- Founder: Malik Mihkhan
- Established: c. 1532-38

Specifications
- Length: 6.44 m (21.1 ft)
- Width: 6.36 m (20.9 ft)
- Interior area: 40.9584 m²
- Dome: 1
- Inscriptions: 1
- Materials: Brick

Jorbangla Mosque (Bengali: জোড়বাংলা মসজিদ) or Jora Dhibi Mosque (Bengali: জোড়া ঢিবি মসজিদ) is a 16th century Bengal Sultanate period mosque located in Barobazar of Kaliganj Upazila of Jhenaidah District. The name Jorbangla (transl. two huts or twin huts), may be derived from twin huts that are said to have once existed on its east side. It is part of the historic site of Mohammadabad.

== History ==
The original structure dated to 1532-38 on the basis of few terracotta inscriptions discovered from the site. The inscription records the mosque was built during the reign of Sultan Ghiyasuddin Mahmud Shah (r. 1532–1538). The mosque compound was excavated in 1992-1993 by the Department of Archaeology and Museums, the structure was meticulously reconstructed from a heavily ruined state. The excavation discovered 14 structures including mosque, pond and cemetery. Only the foundations of the octagonal corner towers and portions of the interior walls, up to the height of the mihrab arches, remained intact from the original construction. A pond is situated near the mosque. It is believed that the pond was excavated for the worshippers during Mahmud Shah's reign.

== Architecture ==
The interior is 6.44 by 6.36 m (21.1 by 20.9 ft) and the wall thickness is 1.44 m (4.7 ft). The platform's sizes are 19.35 by 17.03 m (63.5 by 55.9 ft) with a height of 55 cm. The mosque is a square, single-domed structure characterized by octagonal corner towers. It features three entrances on the eastern facade: a central entrance measuring 1.07 meters in width and two side entrances, each 86 centimeters wide. These correspond to three semicircular mihrabs on the western wall, with the central mihrab being larger and projecting outward on the exterior.

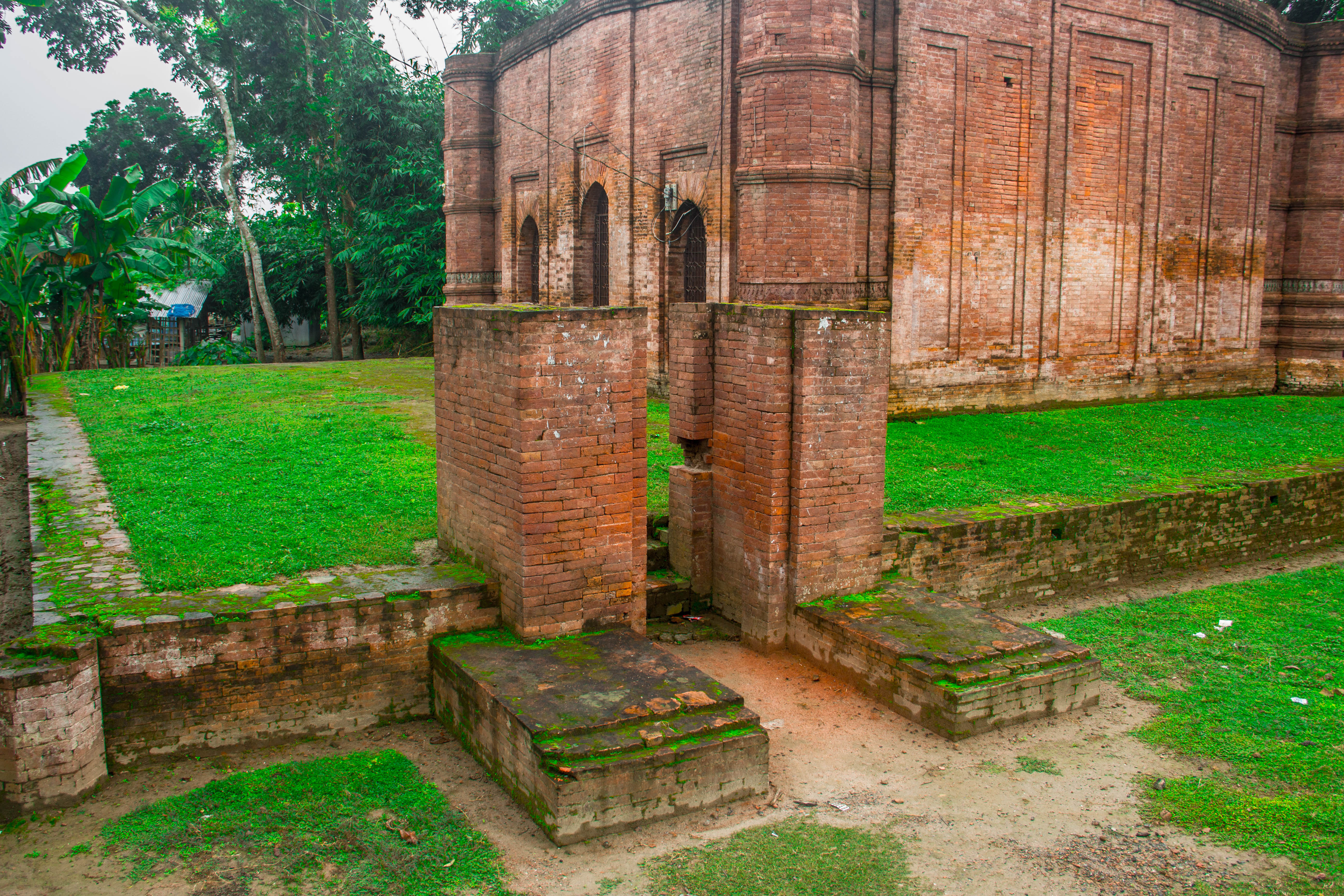
Entrances of the Jorbangla Mosque

The mihrabs are framed by engaged pilasters and rectangular borders with mesh patterns reminiscent of those found in the Bagerhat mosques. The central mihrab is distinguished by a flamboyant five-lobed arch, adorned with a stylized bell and chain-of-flowers motif, similar to that of the Bagha Mosque (1523–24), and crowned with a lotus-bud finial. The side mihrabs lack hanging motifs. The engaged pilasters feature octagonal shafts resting on square bases and are topped with pot capitals. The exterior of the mosque is further defined by bold horizontal mouldings on the corner towers.

== Inscriptions ==
Some of the terracotta fragments are missing the text is partially lost. The extracted inscription of the mosque reads:

The Prophet, may Peace and Blessings of Allah be upon him, said, 'Whoever builds a mosque, Allah will build for him a palace in the Heaven' [Hadith]. The Mosque has been constructed during the reign of Ghiyathud Din Abul Muzaffar Mahmud Shah Sultan, son of Husain Shah Sultan. May Allah make his Kingdom and Authority lasting. Its builder is the Dignified and Revered General malik Mihkhan ... the humble Kamhina, the Wazir of the city [Shahr] Muhammadabad in the year 9

== See also ==
- Islam in Bangladesh
- List of mosques in Bangladesh
