= Jhenaidah-2 =

Constituency of Bangladesh's Jatiya Sangsad

Coordinates: 23.54°N 89.18°E

- Constituency for the Jatiya Sangsad
- District: Jhenaidah District
- Division: Khulna Division
- Electorate: 506,640 (2026)

Current constituency
- Created: 1984
- Party: Bangladesh Jamaat-e-Islami
- Member: Ali Azam Md. Abu Bakr
- ← 81 Jhenaidah-1 83 Jhenaidah-3 →

Jhenaidah-2 is a constituency represented in the Jatiya Sangsad (National Parliament) of Bangladesh since 2026 by Ali Azam Md. Abu Bakr of the Bangladesh Jamaat-e-Islami.

== Boundaries ==
The constituency encompasses Harinakunda Upazila and all but four union parishads of Jhenaidah Sadar Upazila: Fursondi, Ghorshal, Maharazpur, and Naldanga.

== History ==
The constituency was created in 1984 from a Jessore constituency when the former Jessore District was split into four districts: Jhenaidah, Jessore, Magura, and Narail.

== Members of Parliament ==
Election	Member	Party
1986	Anwar Zahid	Jatiya Party
1988	Ashraful Abedin	Jatiya Party
1991	Mashiur Rahman	Bangladesh Nationalist Party
Feb 1996	Mashiur Rahman	Bangladesh Nationalist Party
Jun 1996	Mashiur Rahman	Bangladesh Nationalist Party
2001	Mashiur Rahman	Bangladesh Nationalist Party
2008	Md. Shafiqul Islam	Awami League
2014	Tahjib Alam Siddique	Independent
2018	Tahjib Alam Siddique	Awami League
2024	Nasser Shahrear Zahedee Mohul	Independent
2026	Ali Azam Md Abu Bakar	Bangladesh Jamaat-e-Islami

== Elections ==
=== Elections in the 2020s ===
General Election 2026: Jhenaidah-2
Party	Candidate	Votes	%	±%
Jamaat	Ali Azam Md Abu Bakar	195,702	51.8	N/A
BNP	Md. Abdul Majid	175,984	46.5	N/A
IAB	HM Momtajur Rahman	4,571	1.2	N/A
JP(E)	Saogat ul Islam	944	0.2	N/A
CPB	Md. Abu Towab	557	0.1	N/A
BSD	Md. Asadul Islam	340	0.1	N/A
Majority		19,718	5.2	N/A
Turnout		378,098	74.6	N/A
Registered electors		506,640		
Jamaat gain from Independent				

=== Elections in the 2010s ===
General Election 2014: Jhenaidah-2
Party	Candidate	Votes	%	±%
Independent	Tahjib Alam Siddique	67,984	56.1	N/A
AL	Md. Shafiqul Islam	51,244	42.3	−9.3
BNF	Md. Mominul Islam	1,858	1.5	N/A
Majority		16,740	13.8	+9.2
Turnout		121,086	32.0	−59.4
Independent gain from AL				

=== Elections in the 2000s ===
General Election 2008: Jhenaidah-2
Party	Candidate	Votes	%	±%
AL	Md. Shafiqul Islam	161,062	51.6	+7.4
BNP	Mashiur Rahaman	146,736	47.1	+2.9
IAB	Md. Sharafhat Hossain Joarder	3,495	1.1	N/A
PDP	Md. Mijanur Rahaman	361	0.1	N/A
Jatiya Samajtantrik Dal-JSD	Mrs. Rehena Akhter Hira	188	0.1	N/A
Majority		14,326	4.6	−5.6
Turnout		311,842	91.4	+5.7
AL gain from BNP				

General Election 2001: Jhenaidah-2
Party	Candidate	Votes	%	±%
BNP	Mashiur Rahman	144,951	54.4	+13.5
AL	Nur-e-Alam Siddiqui	117,706	44.2	+10.4
IJOF	Md. Jalal Uddin Ahmmed	3,245	1.2	N/A
Bangladesh Samajtantrik Dal (Basad-Khalekuzzaman)	Tahera Begum Jali	206	0.1	N/A
Ganatantri Party	Md. Rezaul Karim	110	0.0	N/A
Majority		27,245	10.2	+3.1
Turnout		266,218	85.7	+1.3
BNP hold				

=== Elections in the 1990s ===
General Election June 1996: Jhenaidah-2
Party	Candidate	Votes	%	±%
BNP	Mashiur Rahman	83,967	40.9	−6.4
AL	Nur-e-Alam Siddiqui	69,353	33.8	+10.2
Jamaat	Nur Mohammad	41,247	20.1	−1.0
JP(E)	Md. Mosharraf Hossain Mosa	8,411	4.1	−0.8
Jamiat Ulema-e-Islam Bangladesh	Arif Billah	1,237	0.6	N/A
Zaker Party	Md. Abu Taleb	896	0.4	−1.6
Bangladesh Samajtantrik Dal (Khalekuzzaman)	Tahera Begum Jali	130	0.1	N/A
FP	Anwarul Karim	41	0.0	−0.1
Majority		14,614	7.1	−16.6
Turnout		205,282	84.4	+18.4
BNP hold				

General Election 1991: Jhenaidah-2
Party	Candidate	Votes	%	±%
BNP	Mashiur Rahman	76,001	47.3	
AL	Motiar Rahman	37,923	23.6	
Jamaat	Md. Abul Kashem	33,975	21.1	
JP(E)	Ashraful Abedin	7,912	4.9	
Zaker Party	K. M. Zahangir Mazmadar	3,166	2.0	
BKA	Hatem Ali	1,455	0.9	
Jatiya Samajtantrik Dal-JSD	Md. Shafiur Rahman	169	0.1	
FP	Anwarul Karim	89	0.1	
UCL	Md. Abdul Matin Miah	57	0.0	
Majority		38,078	23.7	
Turnout		160,747	66.0	
BNP gain from JP(E)				
