= Nangolmora Union =

Coordinates: 22.560°N 91.842°E

Nangalmora Union is a union parishad under Hathazari Upazila, Chittagong District, Bangladesh. It has a total area of 462 acres (187 ha).

== Geography ==
Nangalmora is situated on the bank of Halda River. The union is surrounded by Gumanmardan Union in the west, Chhibatali Union on the south, Raozan and Fatikchhari Upazilas in the east.

== Economy ==
There are no big markets in this union. The villagers usually go to Hathazari for marketings. A haat takes place on the bank of Halda River twice a week which is known as "Kanno Hat".

== Education ==
- Nangalmora High School.
- Nangalmora Shamsul Ulum Fazil Madrasha.
- Nangalmora govt Primary School.
- South Nangalmora Islamia Govt. Primary School.
