= Sana Ullah =

Islamic scholar, lawyer and politician (1905 – 1963)

Muhammad Sanaullah
- মহম্মদ ছানাউল্লাহ

Member of the Bengal Legislative Assembly (MLA)
- In office 7 April 1937 – 14 May 1946
- Succeeded by: Farid Ahmad Choudhury

Personal details
- Born: 1 March 1905 North Madarsha, Hathazari, Chittagong District, Bengal Presidency
- Died: 13 February 1963 (aged 57) Dacca, East Pakistan
- Party: Krishak Praja Party
- Relatives: Anisul Islam Mahmud (grandson)
- Education: Chittagong College
- Alma mater: University of London; University of Cambridge; Presidency College Calcutta

Personal life
- Education: Darul Uloom Deoband; Mazahir Uloom; Darul Uloom Hathazari

Religious life
- Religion: Islam
- Denomination: Sunni
- Jurisprudence: Hanafi
- Movement: Deobandi

Muslim leader
- Influenced by: Maniruzzaman Islamabadi

Muhammad Sanallah (Bengali: মহম্মদ ছানাউল্লাহ; 1 March 1905 – 13 February 1963) was an Islamic scholar, lawyer and politician from what was then East Pakistan. He was a member of the Bengal Legislative Assembly (MLA) in British India.

== Birth and early life ==
Sanaullah was born on 1 March 1905 in North Madarsha village of Hathazari, Chittagong District, Bengal Presidency. He is the only child of his father Anar Ali and mother Rafeya Khatun. His father was an officer under the British in Akyab, present-day Myanmar. He studied at Darul Uloom Hathazari and obtained a degree in Dawrae Hadith (Title) from Mazahir Uloom Saharanpur, India. Graduated from Darul Uloom Deoband in 1926.

In 1927, he passed matriculation from Hathazari Parvati High School. Passed I.A from Chittagong College in 1929. He passed BA from Presidency College Calcutta in 1931. After that he passed MA from University of Cambridge. He obtained his Bar-at-Law degree from Lincoln's Inn University in 1934. He obtained his PhD degree from the University of London in 1935.

== Career ==
Sanaullah passed the Indian Civil Service Examination twice in 1932 and 1933. He started his career as a teacher at the University of Calcutta and served as the Chief Examiner in the Department of Arabic, Persian and Islamic History for 12 years. In 1942, the Indian PSC nominated him to various higher and important posts. He was last nominated as 'Professor' (equivalent to ICS) in the Senior Educational Service of West Bengal. In 1947, he also served as Federal Public Commissioner in the Indian Ministry of External Affairs. For eight years, he was the Chairman of the Chittagong District Board and President of the School Board. He worked as a Gazetted Judicial Officer, First Class, in the Calcutta High Court.

In 1958, he was appointed Additional Claims Commissioner to the Central Government of Pakistan and served as an important officer. He served as the Administrator General of the Dhaka High Court until his death.

Sanaullah joined Maniruzzaman Islamabadi and the Jamiat Ulema-e-Hind and started his political career. He played a supporting role in the anti-British movement with the All India Congress Party led by Mohandas Gandhi and Jawaharlal Nehru. He was elected MLA twice from the North Chittagong constituency of the Bengal Provincial Council of undivided India in 1937 and 1945.

== Death ==
Sanaullah died on 13 February 1963 in Dacca, East Pakistan. He was buried at his family graveyard in North Madarsha, Chittagong. MP Anisul Islam Mahmud is his grandson.
