= Dhalai Union =

Union council in Chittagong District, Bangladesh

Dhalai Union (Bengali: ধলই) is a union parishad of Hathazari Upazila in Chittagong District, Bangladesh.

== Geography ==
The council covers an area of 4,870 acres (19.7 km^{2}). It is surrounded to the north and west by the Farhadabad Union, to the east by the Halda River, and to the south by the Guman Mardan Union.

== History ==
As of 1991 Bangladesh census, Dhalai union had a population of 29,571 and 4872 housing units. Marketplaces and bazaars in the council include Katirhat bazar, Hadurkhill, Monia Pokor, Noea Hat.

== Education ==
- Katirhat High School
- Katirhat Girl's High School
- katirhat Woman's College
- West Dhalai High School
- Enayetpur High School
- Katirhat M. I. Fazil (degree) Madrasa
- Hadhurkhil Mohila Dhakil Madrasha

More than 8 primary schools and kindergartens.
