= Burirchar Union =

Burischar Union (Bengali: বুড়িশ্চর) is a union of Hathazari Upazila of Chittagong District.

== Geography ==
Area of Burischar: 946 acres (3.83 km^{2}).

== Location ==
North: Halda River

East: Chandgaon Thana

South: Chandgaon Thana

West: Shikarpur union

== Population ==
At the 1991 Bangladesh census, Burischar union had a population of 12,860 and 216 house units.
