= Nasser Shahrear Zahedee =

Bangladeshi politician

Md. Nasser Shahrear Zahedee

Member of the Bangladesh Parliament for Jhenaidah-2
- In office 10 January 2024 – 6 August 2024
- Preceded by: Tahjib Alam Siddique
- Succeeded by: Ali Azam Md Abu Bakar

Personal details
- Born: 28 December 1957 (age 68)
- Website: nassershahrearzahedee.com
- Nickname: Mohul

Md. Nasser Shahrear Zahedee (Mohul) (born 28 December 1957) is a Bangladeshi independent politician, pharmacist, entrepreneur and philanthropist. He is the former Jatiya Sangsad member representing the Jhenaidah-2 constituency. And also he is the vice-president of the Bangladesh Football Federation (BFF).

== Early life ==
Mohul was born on 28 December 1957. He completed his Higher Secondary Certificate (HSC) at Jhenaidah Cadet College in 1975. He completed his bachelor's and master's in pharmacy at the University of Dhaka in 1978 and 1979, respectively.

== Career ==
From 1988 to 1998, Mohul worked for Roche. He is the chairman of Aeromate Services Limited, Aerowing Aviation Limited, and Radiant Pharmaceuticals. He is a member of the board of trustees of East West University.

Mohul was elected to parliament from Jhenaidah-2 as an independent candidate on 7 January 2024.

He was elected vice-president of the Bangladesh Football Federation in October 2024. He is also the chairman of the development committee.
