= Ali Azam Md Abu Bakar =

Bangladeshi politician

Members of Parliament
- Incumbent
- Assumed office 17-02-2026
- Preceded by: Nasser Shahrear Zahedee
- Constituency: Jhenaidah-2

Personal details
- Born: October 27, 1969 Jhenaidah Sadar, East Pakistan
- Party: Bangladesh Jamaat-e-Islami
- Spouse: Tasmin Ara
- Occupation: Politician,

Ali Azam Md Abu Bakar (Bengali: আলি আজম মোঃ আবু বকর) is a politician of Bangladesh Jamaat-e-Islami and an incumbent MP from the Jhenaidah-2 constituency.
