= Farhadabad High School =

Coordinates: 22.508278°N 91.806368°E

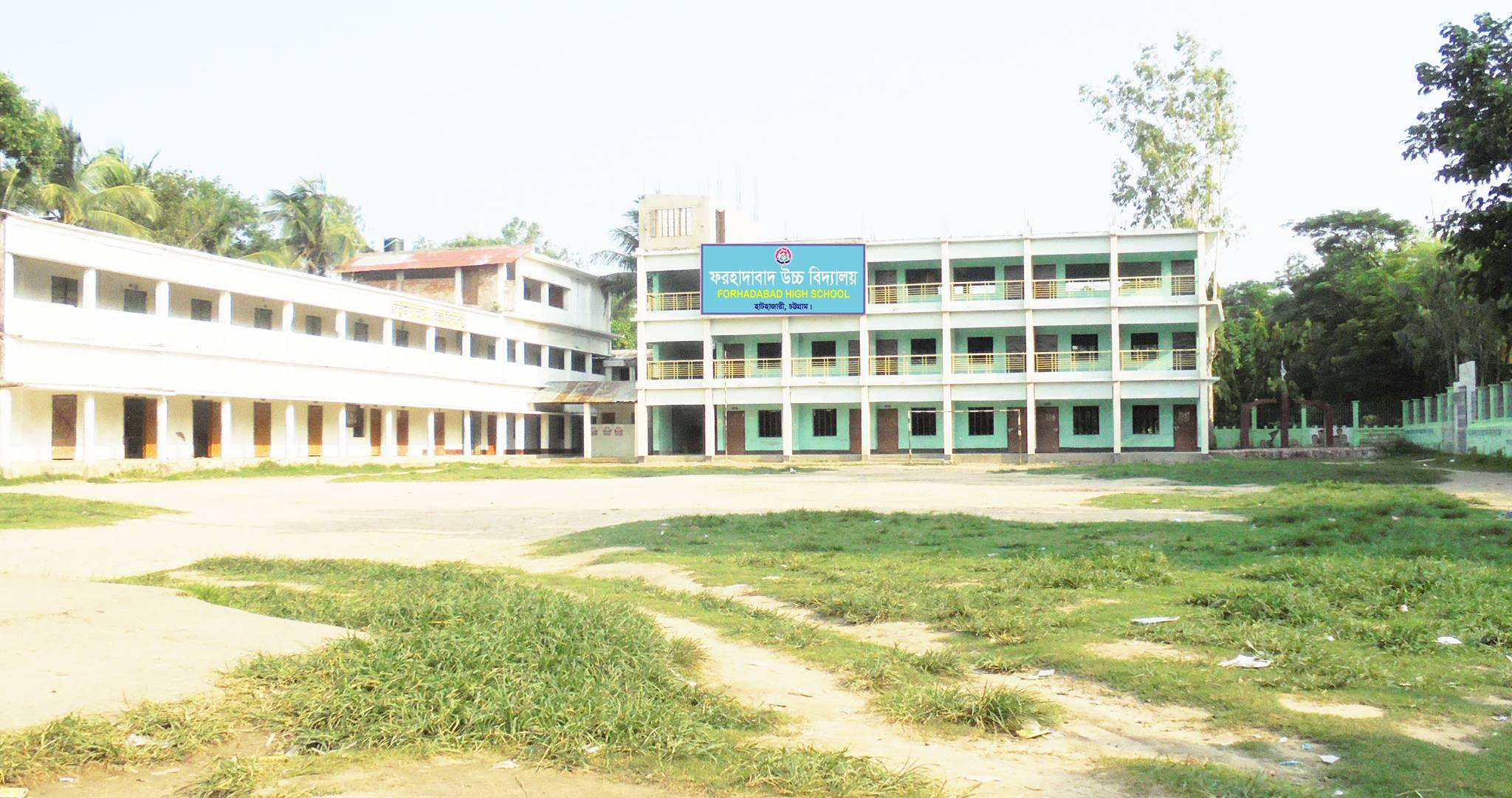

Location
- Nur Ali Miar Hat, Khagrachari Road, Hathazari; Chittagong; Bangladesh

Information
- Motto: "Come to learn, Go to serve"
- Established: 1966
- Principal: Md. Mahbubul Alam sir
- Grades: 6th to 10th Grade
- Colors: White (Boys), White & Blue (Girls)

Farhadabad High School is an educational institution of Farhadabad Union of Hathazari Upazila in Chittagong, the southern port city in Bangladesh. It provides education for about 1500 students from 6th to 10th grade. Established in 1966, it is one of the oldest educational institutes in Hathazari upazila. In 2013, it celebrated its 45th anniversary.

== Facilities ==
The school has a large campus with a substantial playground. It is accredited as study center of Regional Resource Center of Bangladesh Open University, Chittagong. It offers teaching over six days a week to its almost 1500 students. It has a library, a computer lab and a science lab. It has its own running Debating club and Quizing club.

== Administration ==
Apart from being supervised by a governing committee, there are over 20 teachers and accessory employees for academic&collateral activities with Md. Mahbubul Alam observing the duty of Head of the Institution succeeded by two of his predecessors Md. Mir Hossain who was also one of the founding members of the school and Swapan Kumar Dey.

== Celebration of 45 years ==
Farhadabad High School celebrated 45 years of establishment in 2013.
