= Mir Mohammed Helal Uddin =

Bangladeshi politician

- মীর মোহাম্মদ হেলাল উদ্দিন
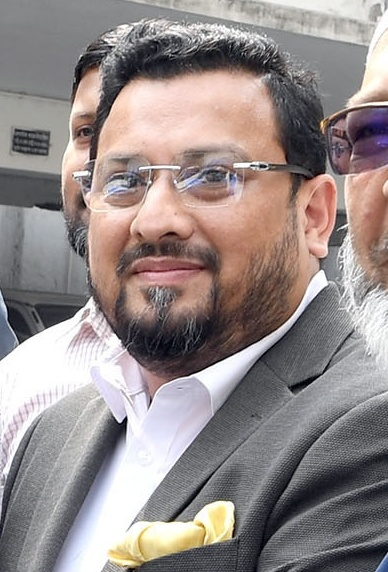
- Helal in 2026

Minister of State for Land
- Incumbent
- Assumed office 12 March 2026
- Prime Minister: Tarique Rahman
- Preceded by: Kayser Kamal

Minister of State for Chittagong Hill Tracts Affairs
- Incumbent
- Assumed office 17 February 2026
- Prime Minister: Tarique Rahman
- Preceded by: Kujendra Lal Tripura

Member of Parliament
- Incumbent
- Assumed office 17 February 2026
- Preceded by: Anisul Islam Mahmud
- Constituency: Chittagong-5

Personal details
- Born: 12 August 1982 (age 44) Hathazari, Chittagong, Bangladesh
- Party: Bangladesh Nationalist Party
- Spouse: Naushin Arjan Helal
- Parent: Mir Mohammad Nasiruddin (father)
- Education: University of Wolverhampton
- Occupation: Barrister, politician
- Website: mirhelal.com

Mir Mohammed Helal Uddin also known as Mir Helal (born 12 August 1982) is a barrister and Bangladesh Nationalist Party politician. He is the incumbent Jatiya Sangsad member representing the Chittagong-5 constituency and the incumbent Minister of State for Ministry of Chittagong Hill Tracts Affairs since February 2026. Later, he was also appointed as the Minister of State for Ministry of Land on 12 March 2026.

== Background ==
Mir Helal is the only son of Mir Mohammad Nasiruddin, a former State Minister of Civil Aviation and Tourism and Mayor of Chattogram City Corporation, and Dalia Nazneen Nasir.

== Career ==
By profession an Advocate of the Supreme Court of Bangladesh, a UK trained Barrister-at-Law, Member of the Honourable Society of Lincoln’s Inn, Uk, Barrister Mir Helal hails from a renowned family of Mir Bari, Mirer Khil Mirer Haat, Hathazari, Chittagong, Bangladesh. Mir Helal is serving as the Assistant Organising Secretary (Chittagong Division) of the National Executive Committee of Bangladesh Nationalist Party – BNP. He is also serving as Special Assistant to BNP Chairperson’s Foreign Afffairs Advisory Committee. Barrister Helal is also Member of the BNP Media Cell. He is Director of Ziaur Rahman Foundation and Convenor of Legal Research Cell, an organization found and headed by the Chairman of BNP and Prime Minister Tarique Rahman.

Uddin won the 2026 Bangladeshi general election contesting at the Chittagong-5 constituency securing 147,054 votes while his nearest opponent Bangladesh Khelafat Majlis candidate Nasiruddin Munir got 46,589 votes.

== Controversy ==
In March 2007, Anti-Corruption Commission filed a case at Gulshan Police Station against Uddin and his family, for illegally accumulating wealth worth around Tk 28 crore and concealing the information. In July, an anti-graft tribunal sentenced Nasiruddin to 13 years' imprisonment and Uddin to 3 year's for abetting his father in those cases. After a series of challenging, acquittals and rehearings by Supreme Court and High Court, in October 2020, Uddin was sent to jail after his surrender. However, In September 2025, the Appellate Division of the Supreme Court acquitted Uddin along with his father.
