= Ashraful Abedin =

Bangladeshi politician

Member of Bangladesh Parliament
- In office 1988–1991
- Preceded by: Anwar Zahid
- Succeeded by: Mashiur Rahman

Personal details
- Party: Jatiya Party (Ershad)

Ashraful Abedin is a Jatiya Party (Ershad) politician and a former member of parliament for the constituency of Jhenaidah-2 in Bangladesh.

== Career ==
Abedin was elected to parliament from Jhenaidah-2 as a Jatiya Party candidate in 1988.
