= Joy Bangla (disambiguation) =

Joy Bangla or Joi Bangla may refer to:

- Joy Bangla (slogan), a Bengali patriotic slogan and war cry used in Bangladesh and West Bengal.
- Joy Bangla (sculpture), a sculpture at University of Chittagong
- Joi Bangla (EP), a 1971 extended play record by Bengali musician Ravi Shankar.
