= Baribathan =

Village in Bangladesh

Baribathan (Bengali: বাড়িবাথান) is a village in Paglakanai Union of Jhenaidah Sadar Upazila, Jhenaidah District of southwestern Bangladesh.

== Geography ==
Baribathan is located near Jhenaidah town at 23°31'34.2"N 89°08'56.2"E. Baribathan is bounded by the villages of Rajapur, Fakirabad, Varuapara, Goyeshpur. Tropical vegetation and moist soils characterize the land. The village has two mosque, one primary school and one madrasa.

== Demographics ==
According to the 2011 Bangladesh census, Baribathan had 444 households and a population of 1,827. The village is 99.5% Muslim and 0.5% Hindu.

== Points of interest ==
- Dhol Somudur Dighi, Baribathan: A huge pond attracts many visitors. The pond with its historical past is located 4 kilometres (2.5 mi) away from main city

== Education ==
- Baribathan Govt. Primary School
- Baribathan Adarsha Dakhil Madrasa
