= Shakila Farzana =

Bangladeshi lawyer and politician

- সাকিলা ফারজানা

Member of the Bangladesh Parliament for Women's Reserved Seat-8
- Incumbent
- Assumed office 3 May 2026
- Preceded by: Kohale Quddus

Personal details
- Born: 1975 or 1976 (age 50–51)
- Children: 2
- Parent: Syed Wahidul Alam (father)
- Education: University of Chittagong; University of London

Shakila Farzana (born 1975 or 1976) is a Bangladeshi barrister and politician. She is a practicing lawyer at the High Court Division of the Supreme Court. She is the incumbent Jatiya Sangsad member from the Women's Reserved Seat-8 since May 2026.

== Background and education ==
Farzana was born to Syed Wahidul Alam who was a Bangladesh Nationalist Party (BNP) whip served during 2001–2006 and a Jatiya Sangsad member representing Chittagong-5 from 1991 until 2006.

Farzana completed her SSC from Bangladesh Mahila Samiti Girls' High School & College, and HSC from Chittagong College. She completed her LLB and LLM from University of Chittagong. She achieved another LLB degree from the University of London and completed Bar Vocational Course at the City University, London.

== Career ==
Farzana worked with jurists barrister Rafique Ul Huq for two years and barrister Rokanuddin Mahmud for more than four years. She then started her own legal chamber "Law Cornerstone" in 2008. She is a member of the Dhaka District Bar Association and the Supreme Court Bar Association. She served as the joint general secretary of the Supreme Court wing of Bangladesh Jatiyatabadi Ainjibi Forum, a pro-BNP lawyers’ body.

In August 2015, Rapid Action Battalion (RAB) arrested three lawyers, including Farzana and Hasanuzzaman Liton, from Dhanmondi area of Dhaka. They were charged of financing militant outfit Sahed Hamza Brigade (SHB) in connection with arms recovery from Latmoni hill in Banshkhali Upazila in early February. Farzana was released on bail ten months later in June 2016. In March 2025, everyone accused was acquitted due to insufficient evidence.

In April 2026, BNP nominated Farzana in one of the women's reserved seats of parliament.

== Personal life ==
Farzana is married to Md Bahauddin, a businessman based in Chittagong. Together they have two children.
