= Joy Bangla (sculpture) =

Sculpture at University of Chittagong

Joy Bangla জয় বাংলা
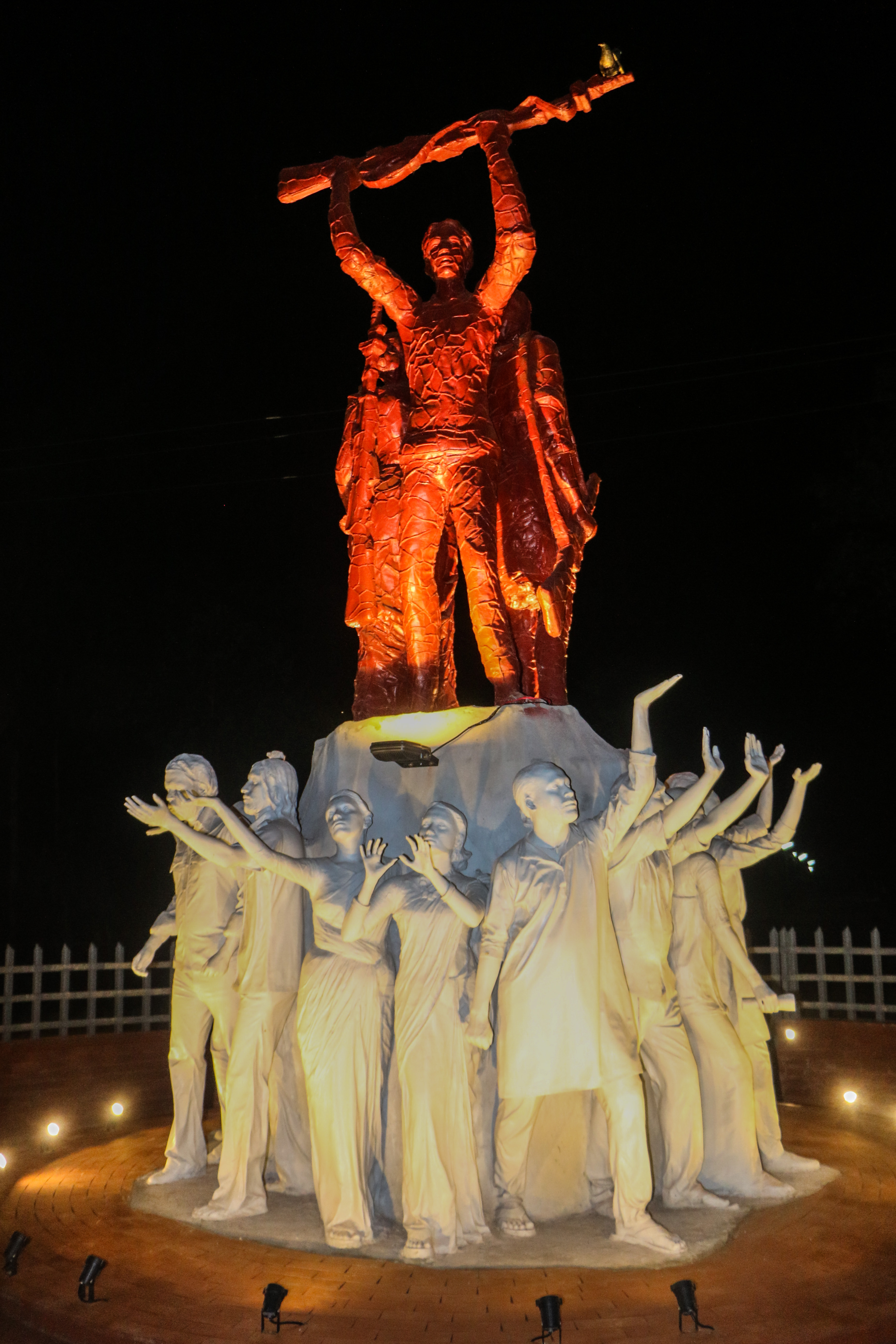
- Joy Bangla in October 2018
- Artist: Syed Mohammad Sohrab Jahan
- Year: 25 October 2018
- Medium: Iron, Cement, Marble
- Subject: Bangladesh Liberation War
- Dimensions: 5.5 m × 6.7 m (18 ft × 22 ft)
- Location: Fatepur Union, Hathazari
- 22.471308°N 91.785002°E
- Owner: University of Chittagong

Joy Bangla (Bengali: জয় বাংলা, lit. 'Victory to Bengal') is a memorial sculpture commemorating the Bangladesh Liberation War. The sculpture is located beside the central Shaheed Minar in the Intellectuals' Quarters of the University of Chittagong. The original design was created by Syed Mohammad Sohrab Jahan. The name is taken from the slogan Joy Bangla. The sculpture was officially unveiled on 25 October 2018. It is one of the Shaheed Minar and five memorial monuments at the university, and the first sculpture at the university dedicated to the Liberation War.

== Construction ==
In June 2017, students at the University of Chittagong marched to demand a sculpture commemorating the Bangladesh Liberation War, and preliminary work on the construction project began. Students from the university's Faculty of Fine Arts, Syed Mohammad Sohrab Jahan, Mujahidur Rahman Musa, Joyashish Acharya and Tapan Ghosh collaborated on the design of Joy Bangla, and the current design was selected from five initial proposals.

All human portraits are taken from "living human moulds". Iron, cement, stone, and glass fiber are the sculpture's primary materials. The forms were created by pouring concrete over an iron framework. The upper portion is painted red and the lower portion white. Leather was used as a coating for the freedom fighters' figures. The standing student figures below are finished with marble dust applied over cement casts.

Construction began in March 2018. The project received 10 lakh (1,000,000) Bangladeshi taka (BDT) in private funding, and the university allocated an additional 5 lakh (500,000) BDT to the initial budget. The total cost to complete construction was 20 lakh (2,000,000) BDT. The work took nine months to finish.

== Description ==
The sculpture is installed on two tiers. The upper tier features two male and one female freedom fighter figures, symbolizing the participation of both men and women in the Liberation War. One of the male fighters is depicted as a Bengali and the other as a member of an ethnic group from the Chittagong Hill Tracts, representing the joint participation of hill peoples and Bengalis in the struggle in Chittagong. On the ground level, twenty student figures of the present generation are depicted, representing those who preserve the achievements of the Liberation War.

The sculpture's height from the ground is approximately 18 feet, and its width is about 22 feet. The two standing freedom fighter figures on the upper tier are 11 feet tall. The student figures on the lower tier measure between 5.5 and 6 feet in height.
