= Ganna Union =

Ganna Union গান্না ইউনিয়ন
- Union
- Ganna Union
- Location within Bangladesh
- Coordinates: 23.4898°N 89.0802°E
- Country: Bangladesh
- Division: Khulna
- District: Jhenaidah
- Upazila: Jhenaidah Sadar

Area
  - Total: 89.35 km^{2} (34.50 sq mi)

Population (2011)
  - Total: 25,583
  - Density: 286.3/km^{2} (741.6/sq mi)
- Time zone: UTC+6 (BST)
- Website: gannaup.jhenaidah.gov.bd

Ganna Union (Bengali: গান্না ইউনিয়ন) is a union parishad of Jhenaidah Sadar Upazila, in Jhenaidah District, Khulna Division of Bangladesh. The union has an area of 89.35 square kilometres (34.50 sq mi) and as of 2001 had a population of 25,583. There are 26 villages and 24 mouzas in the union.
