= Sadhuhati Union =

Sadhuhati Union সাধুহাটী ইউনিয়ন
- Union
- Sadhuhati Union
- Location within Bangladesh
- Coordinates: 23.5641°N 88.9861°E
- Country: Bangladesh
- Division: Khulna
- District: Jhenaidah
- Upazila: Jhenaidah Sadar

Area
  - Total: 38.07 km^{2} (14.70 sq mi)

Population (2011)
  - Total: 30,288
  - Density: 795.6/km^{2} (2,061/sq mi)
- Time zone: UTC+6 (BST)
- Website: sadhuhatiup.jhenaidah.gov.bd

The Sadhuhati Union (Bengali: সাধুহাটী ইউনিয়ন) is a union parishad of Jhenaidah Sadar Upazila, in Jhenaidah District, Khulna Division of Bangladesh. The union has an area of 38.07 square kilometres (14.70 sq mi) and as of 2001 had a population of 30,288. There are 14 villages and 5 mouzas in the union.
