= Porahati Union =

Porahati Union পোড়াহাটী ইউনিয়ন
- Union
- Porahati Union
- Country: Bangladesh
- Division: Khulna
- District: Jhenaidah
- Upazila: Jhenaidah Sadar

Area
  - Total: 77.90 km^{2} (30.08 sq mi)

Population (2011)
  - Total: 26,408
  - Density: 339.0/km^{2} (878.0/sq mi)
- Time zone: UTC+6 (BST)
- Website: porahatiup.jhenaidah.gov.bd

Porahati Union (Bengali: পোড়াহাটী ইউনিয়ন) is a union parishad situated at Jhenaidah Sadar Upazila, in Jhenaidah District, Khulna Division of Bangladesh. The union has an area of 77.90 square kilometres (30.08 sq mi) and as of 2001 had a population of 26,408. There are 22 villages and 19 mouzas in the union.
