= Hathazari Upazila =

Upazila in Chattogram Division, Bangladesh

Hathazari হাটহাজারী
- Upazila
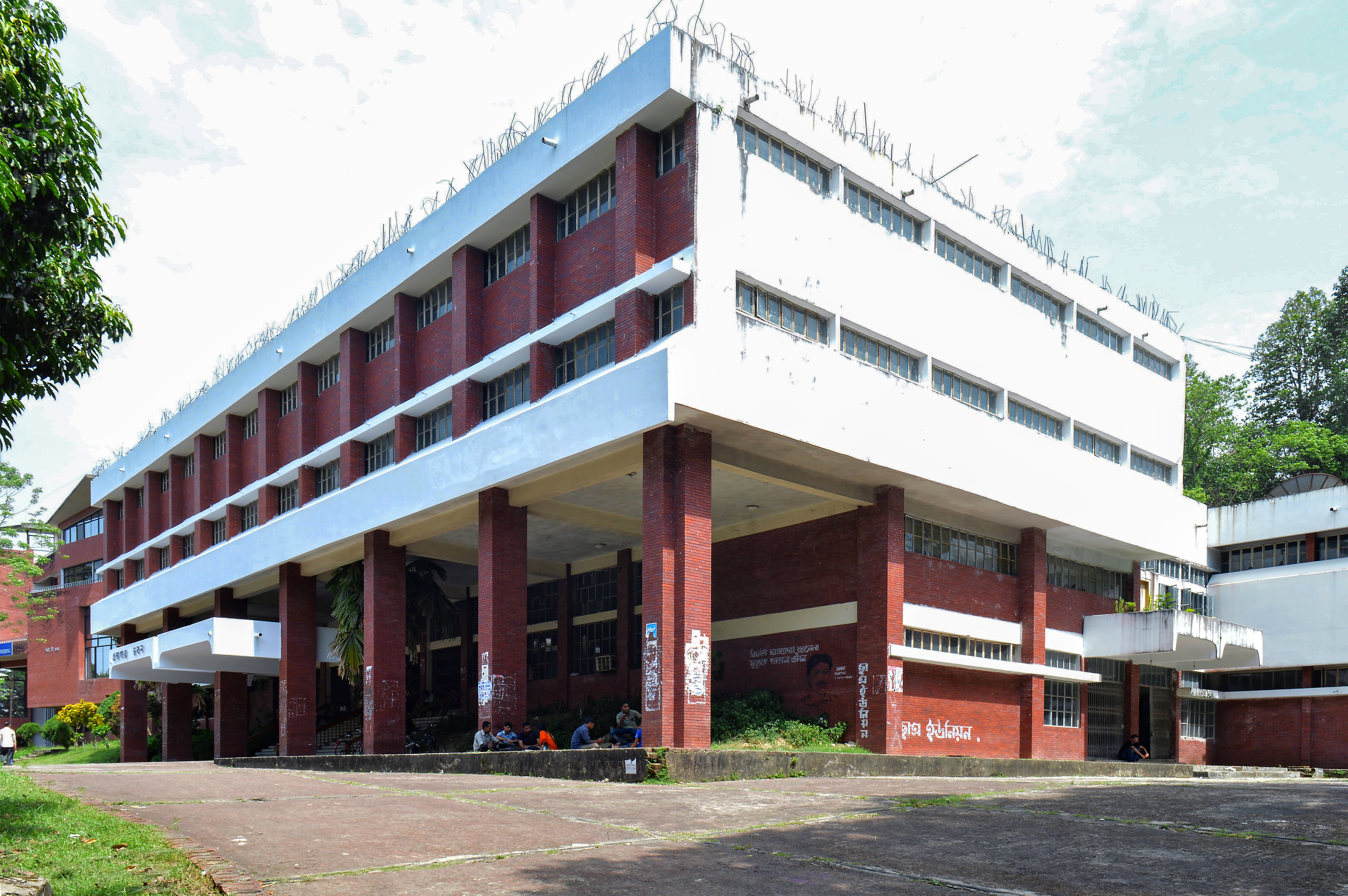
- Library of University of Chittagong

- Coordinates: 22°30′N 91°48′E
- Country: Bangladesh
- Division: Chittagong
- District: Chittagong
- Jatiya Sangsad constituency: Chittagong-5
- Headquarter: Hathazari Upazila Complex

Government
  - Body: Upazila Council
  - MP: Vacant
  - Chairman: Vacant
  - Chief Executive Officer: A.B.M. Mashiuzzaman

Area
  - Total: 246.32 km^{2} (95.10 sq mi)

Population (2022)
  - Total: 498,182
  - Density: 2,022.5/km^{2} (5,238.2/sq mi)
- Time zone: UTC+6 (BST)
- Postal code: 4330
- Area code: 03023
- Website: hathazari.chittagong.gov.bd

Hathazari Upazila mauza geocode map

Hathazari (Bengali: হাটহাজারী উপজেলা) is an upazila of Chattogram District in Chattogram Division, Bangladesh.

== Geography ==
Hathazari is located at 22.5083°N 91.8083°E. It has a total area of 246.32 km^{2}. The main river is Halda. It is surrounded by Fatikchhari Upazila on the north, Panchlaish Thana and Chandgaon Thana on the south, Raozan Upazila on the east and Sitakunda Upazila on the west.

== History ==
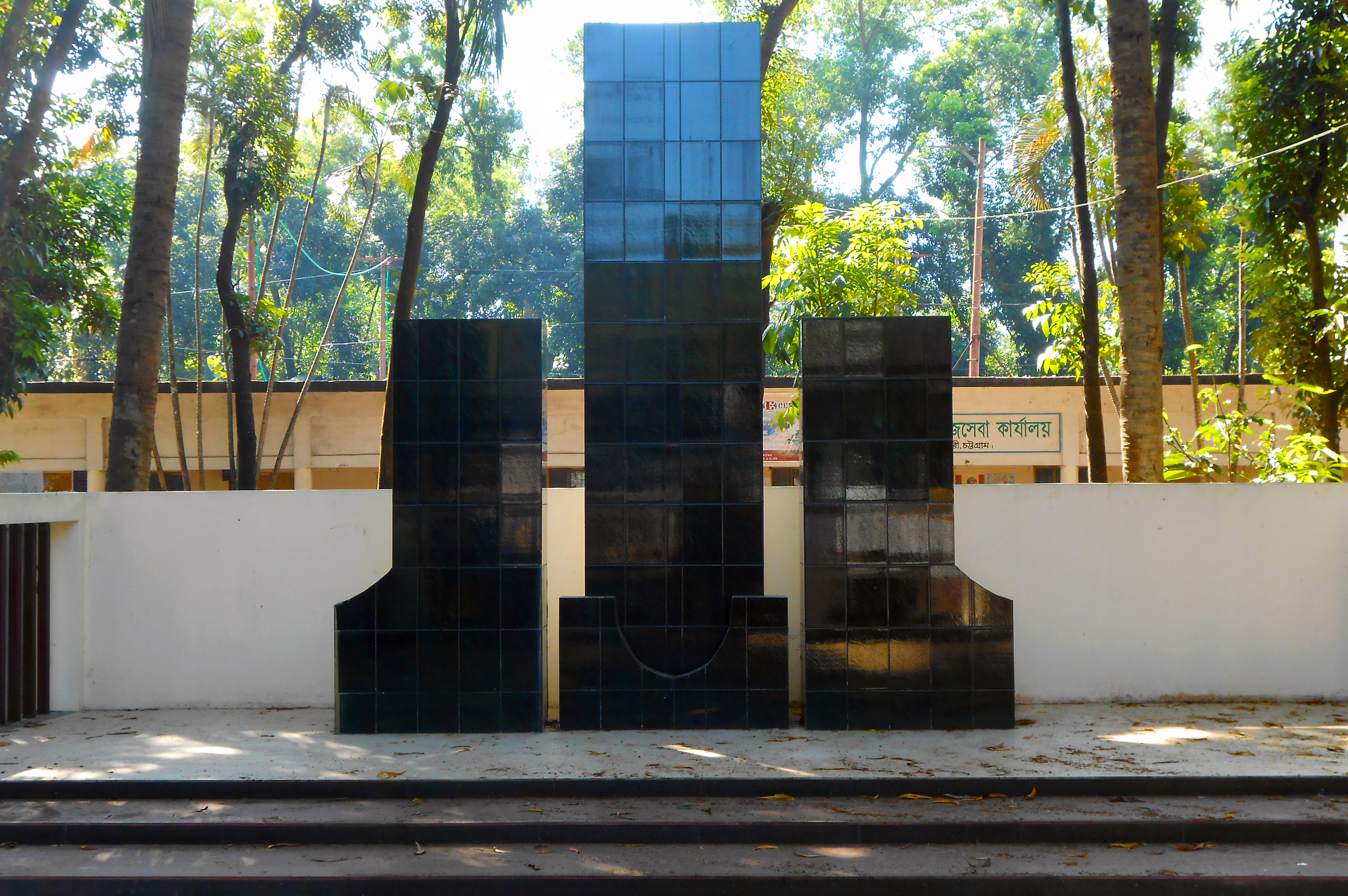
A monument commemorating the martyrs of the Bangladesh Liberation War.

Part of the ancient kingdom of Harikela, 36 thin bull-and-triglyph silver coins were discovered inside a little clay pot in Hathazari's Jobra village in July 1980. All, except one, mentioned the kingdom of Harikela. The Kingdom of Mrauk U built numerous mudforts in present-day Hathazari.

In the fifteenth century, the Sultan of Bengal Shamsuddin Yusuf Shah had a mosque constructed in Dewannagar mouza which is now known as Faqir Mosque. During an expedition against the Arakanese in the early 16th century, Prince Nasiruddin Nasrat Shah passed through the area where he dug a reservoir and built a mosque which still stands today in Chikandandi Union. During the Mughal period, present-day Hathazari was a part of the Aurangabad Pargana. 12 hazaris were appointed to keep law and order and defend the pargana of Aurangabad. Due to Aurangabad being so far away from Murshidabad, the erstwhile capital of the Nawabs of Bengal, the hazaris neglected their duties. The Nawab's representative, Mahasingh, resorted to a ruse to undermine the power of the Hazaris and took the invitation to the Nawab's Kanchari in Sitakunda by cheating with the help of a trick. He was able to betray and capture eight of the twelve Hazaris and send them to Murshidabad. Two of the ten remaining Hazaris surrendered and were excused. The Nawab of Bengal imprisoned the eight Hazaris in iron cages and ordered them to be drowned in the Ganges. One of the excused Hazaris, Bir Singh Hazari, established a haat bazaar in the area and so it came to be known as Hathazari (The haat/market of the Hazari).

Hathazari Thana (an area controlled by a police station) was formed in 1929. The following year, it was the site of a battle between Bengali revolutionaries led by Surya Sen and Ananta Singh, and British Indian Army soldiers. Four days earlier, the revolutionaries had carried out the Chittagong armoury raid. British forces caught up with them at Jalalabad Hill. In the ensuing fight over 80 soldiers and 12 revolutionaries were killed. Sen dispersed his men to neighbouring villages in small groups, allowing some to escape or delay capture.

During the Burma campaign 1944–45, the United States Army Air Forces used the Hathazari Airfield as a supply point and staging airfield for resupply airlift drops over Burma and also as a radio relay station. During the Bangladesh Liberation War of 1971, 11 Bengali freedom fighters were murdered near Nazirhat Bus Stand. The Nobel Prize-recognised Grameen Bank was established in the village of Jobra through a rural banking project there. Hathazari Thana was made an upazila in 1983.

== Demographics ==
Religions in Hathazari Upazila (2022)
Religion	Percent
Islam	90.06%
Hinduism	8.73%
Buddhism	1.13%
Other or not stated	0.08%

According to the 2022 Bangladeshi census, Hathazari Upazila had 109,952 households and a population of 498,182. 9.46% of the population were under 5 years of age. Hathazari had a literacy rate (age 7 and over) of 86.28%: 88.31% for males and 84.38% for females, and a sex ratio of 94.76 males for every 100 females. 195,077 (39.16%) lived in urban areas. Ethnic population was 2,679 (0.54%), of which Tripura were 879.

As of the 2011 Census of Bangladesh, Hathazari upazila had 81,292 households and a population of 431,748. 92,041 (21.32%) were under 10 years of age. Hathazari had an average literacy rate of 63.50%, compared to the national average of 51.8%, and a sex ratio of 1006 females per 1000 males. 60 (0.01%) of the population lived in urban areas.

== Literacy and education ==
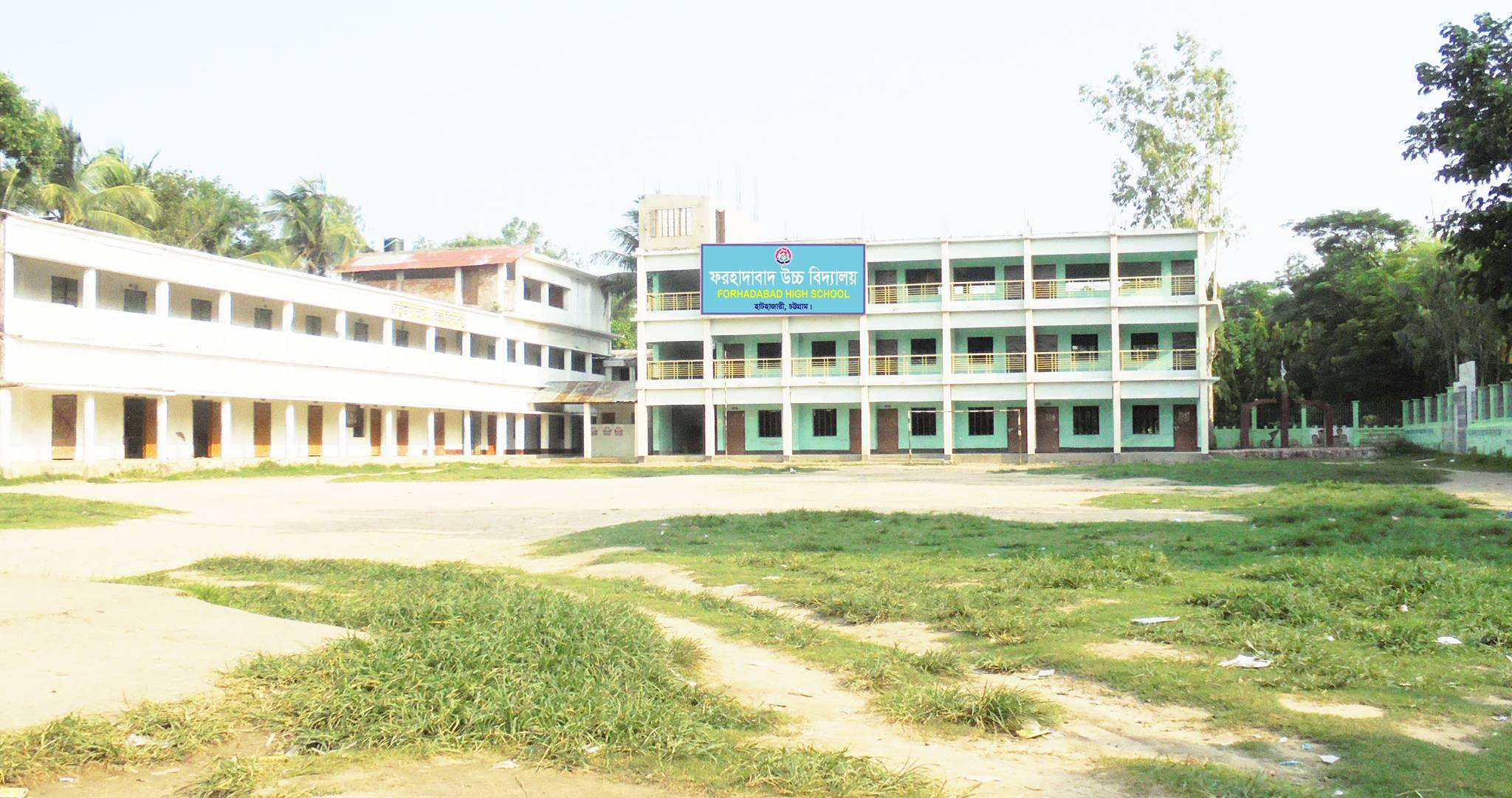
Farhadabad High School grounds.

The average literacy rate of Hathazari is 57.9%; with male percentage being 61.1% and female being 54.6%. Al-Jamiatul Ahlia Darul Ulum Moinul Islam, established in 1896, is the oldest and largest Deobandi institution in the country - ranking among the top ten madrasas in the subcontinent. The public research University of Chittagong in Fatehpur was founded in 1966 and is notable for having the largest campus among the universities of Bangladesh. Hathazari Government University College, the Hathazari research and farm-based campus of the Chittagong Veterinary and Animal Sciences University, Fatehpur Mehernega High School Fatehabad Model Multilateral High School and Farhadabad High School are also notable educational institutions of Hathazari. The Bangladesh Agricultural Research Institute has a research station in Hathazari.

== Administration ==
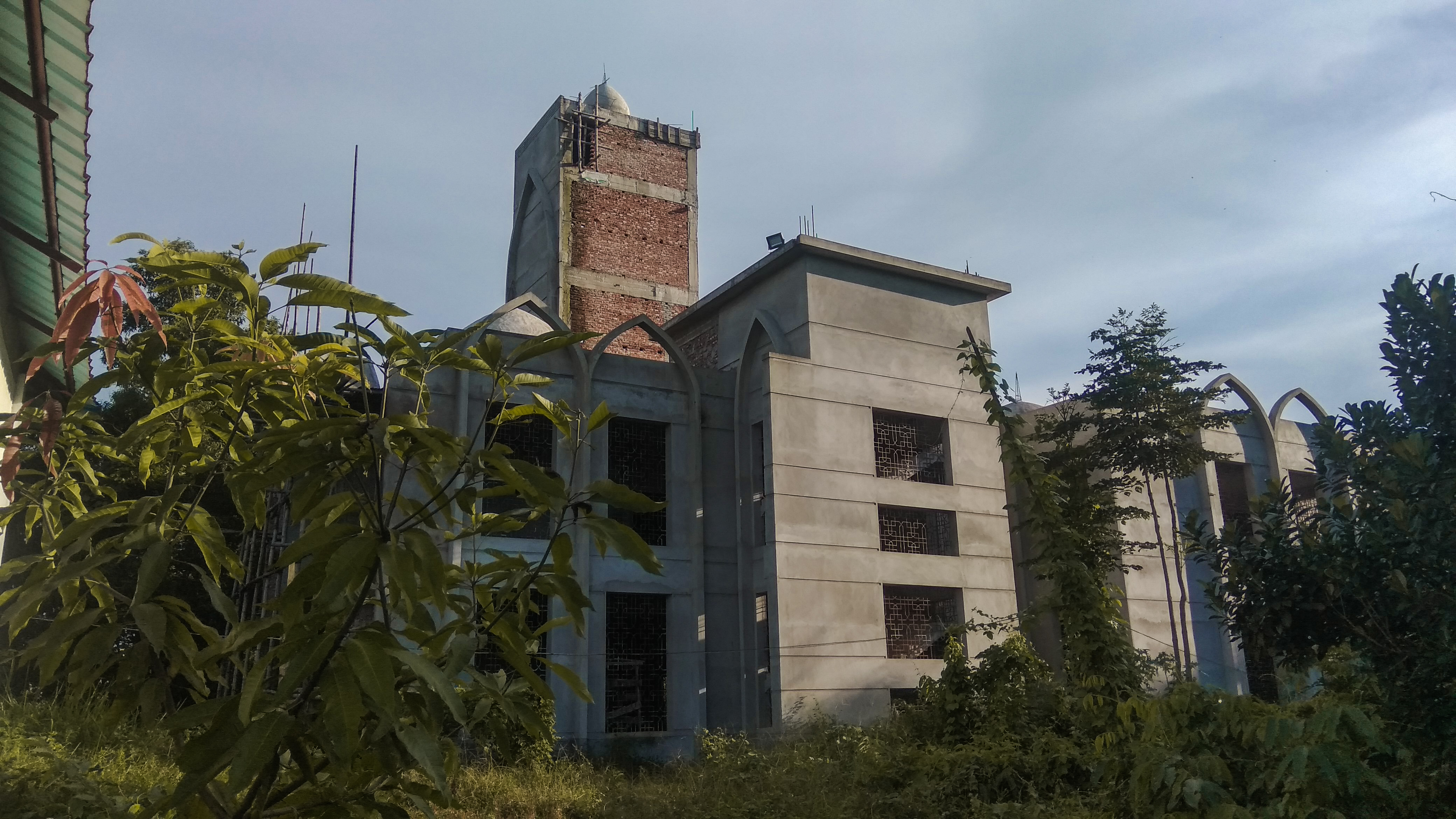
Research and farm-based campus mosque of the Chittagong Veterinary and Animal Sciences University.

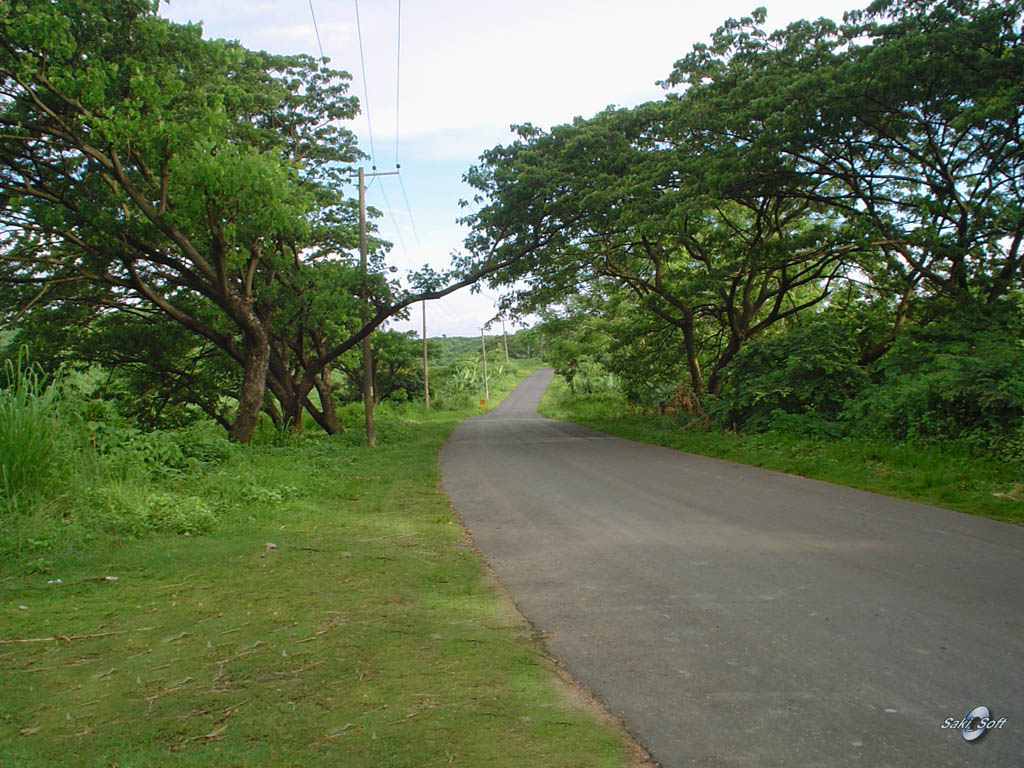
A road in Hathazari.

Hathazari Upazila is divided into 15 union parishads, further divided into 48 mouzas and 59 villages. The unions are:

1. Burirchar
2. Chhibatali
3. Chikandandi
4. South Madarsha
5. Dhalai
6. Fatehpur
7. Forhadabad
8. Garduara
9. Gumanmardan
10. Hathazari
11. Mekhal
12. Mirzapur
13. Nangalmora
14. Shikarpur
15. North Madarsha

=== Upazila chairmen ===
Name	Term
Syed Wahidul Alam	25/5/1985-24/5/1990
Muhammad Nurul Amin	25/5/1990-23/11/1991
Muhammad Ismail	2009–2014
Mahbubul Alam Chowdhury	2014–2019
SM Rashidul Alam	2019–2024
Yunus Gani Chowdhury	2024–2024

== Notable people ==
- Abdul Hamid Madarshahi, Islamic scholar, author and educationist
- Anisul Islam Mahmud, politician, former minister of environment
- Habibullah Qurayshi, Islamic scholar and educationist
- Mahbubul Alam, award-winning writer
- M Harun-Ar-Rashid, former chief of army staff, recipient of Bir Protik
- Muhammad Faizullah, Islamic speaker and scholar
- Syed Muhammad Ibrahim, former army officer and member of parliament for Cox's Bazar-1 in 2024
- Syed Wahidul Alam, politician
- Faruk-e-Azam, advisor to the Interim government of Bangladesh
- Nurjahan Begum, advisor to the Interim government of Bangladesh
- Saudagar family of Bathua
  - Muhammad Yunus (born 1940), Nobel Peace Prize laureate and former chief adviser of Bangladesh
  - Muhammad Ibrahim (born 1945), physicist and professor
- Yahya Alampuri

== See also ==
- Upazilas of Bangladesh
- Districts of Bangladesh
- Divisions of Bangladesh
