= Dogachi Union, Jhenaidah Sadar =

Dogachi Union দোগাছি ইউনিয়ন
- Union
- Dogachi Union
- Location within Bangladesh
- Coordinates: 23.5149°N 89.2372°E
- Country: Bangladesh
- Division: Khulna
- District: Jhenaidah
- Upazila: Jhenaidah Sadar

Area
  - Total: 41.19 km^{2} (15.90 sq mi)

Population (2011)
  - Total: 11,995
  - Density: 291.2/km^{2} (754.2/sq mi)
- Time zone: UTC+6 (BST)
- Website: dogachhiup.jhenaidah.gov.bd

Dogachi Union (Bengali: দোগাছি ইউনিয়ন) is a union parishad situated at Jhenaidah Sadar Upazila, in Jhenaidah District, Khulna Division of Bangladesh. The union has an area of 41.19 square kilometres (15.90 sq mi) and as of 2001 had a population of 11,995. There are 14 villages and 9 mouzas in the union.
