= Padmakar Union =

Padmakar Union পদ্মাকর ইউনিয়ন
- Union
- Maharazpur Union
- Location within Bangladesh
- Coordinates: 23.5285°N 89.2979°E
- Country: Bangladesh
- Division: Khulna
- District: Jhenaidah
- Upazila: Jhenaidah Sadar

Area
  - Total: 47.14 km^{2} (18.20 sq mi)

Population (2011)
  - Total: 23,321
  - Density: 494.7/km^{2} (1,281/sq mi)
- Time zone: UTC+6 (BST)
- Website: padmakarup.jhenaidah.gov.bd

Padmakar Union (Bengali: পদ্মাকর ইউনিয়ন) is a union parishad of Jhenaidah Sadar Upazila, in Jhenaidah District, Khulna Division of Bangladesh. The union has an area of 47.14 square kilometres (18.20 sq mi) and as of 2001 had a population of 23,321. There are 17 villages and 7 mouzas in the union.
