= Surat Union =

Union in Khulna Division, Bangladesh

Surat Union সুরাট ইউনিয়ন
- Union
- Surat Union
- Location within Bangladesh
- Coordinates: 23.4909°N 89.1984°E
- Country: Bangladesh
- Division: Khulna
- District: Jhenaidah
- Upazila: Jhenaidah Sadar

Area
  - Total: 43.43 km^{2} (16.77 sq mi)

Population (2011)
  - Total: 13,274
  - Density: 305.6/km^{2} (791.6/sq mi)
- Time zone: UTC+6 (BST)
- Website: suratup.jhenaidah.gov.bd

Surat Union (Bengali: সুরাট ইউনিয়ন) is a union parishad of Jhenaidah Sadar Upazila, in Jhenaidah District, Khulna Division of Bangladesh. The union has an area of 43.43 square kilometres (16.77 sq mi) and as of 2001 had a population of 13,274. There are 12 villages and 12 mouzas in the union.
