= Modhuhati Union =

Modhuhati Union মধুহাটী ইউনিয়ন
- Union
- Modhuhati Union
- Location within Bangladesh
- Coordinates: 23.5072°N 89.0146°E
- Country: Bangladesh
- Division: Khulna
- District: Jhenaidah
- Upazila: Jhenaidah Sadar

Area
  - Total: 95.67 km^{2} (36.94 sq mi)

Population (2011)
  - Total: 31,233
  - Density: 326.5/km^{2} (845.5/sq mi)
- Time zone: UTC+6 (BST)
- Website: modhuhatiup.jhenaidah.gov.bd

Modhuhati Union (Bengali: মধুহাটী ইউনিয়ন) is a union parishad situated at Jhenaidah Sadar Upazila, in Jhenaidah District, Khulna Division of Bangladesh. The union has an area of 95.67 square kilometres (36.94 sq mi) and as of 2001 had a population of 31,233. There are 25 villages and 23 mouzas in the union.
