= Chikandandi Union =

Chikandandi Union চিকনদন্ডী ইউনিয়ন
- Union Council
- No. 12 Chikandandi Union Council
- Location in Bangladesh
- Coordinates: 22.4320°N 91.8203°E
- Country: Bangladesh
- Division: Chittagong Division
- District: Chittagong District
- Upazila: Hathazari Upazila

Government
  - Union Chairman: Hasanuzzaman Bachchu

Area
  - Total: 11.17 km^{2} (4.31 sq mi)

Population
  - Total: 47,573
  - Density: 4,259/km^{2} (11,030/sq mi)
- Time zone: UTC+6 (BST)
- Website: chikandandiup.chittagong.gov.bd

Chikandandi Union (Bengali: চিকনদন্ডী, romanized: Chikondondi) is a union parishad of Hathazari Upazila of Chittagong District, Bangladesh.

== Geography ==
Chikandandi Union has a total area of 11.17 square kilometres (2,761 acres). It is the south-westernmost union of Hathazari Upazila. It borders Fatehpur Union to the north, Dakshin Madarsha and Shikarpur unions to the east, Chittagong to the south, and Sitakunda Upazila to the west.

== Population ==
According to the 2011 Bangladesh census, Chikandandi Union had 9,012 households and a population of 47,573, none of whom lived in urban areas.
