= Tahjib Alam Siddique =

Bangladeshi politician

Tahzeeb Alam Siddique

Member of Parliament
- In office 2014–2024
- Preceded by: Md. Shafiqul Islam
- Succeeded by: Tahzeeb Alam Siddique
- Incumbent
- Assumed office 2019
- Preceded by: Tahzeeb Alam Siddique

Personal details
- Born: 23 July 1975 (age 51)
- Party: Awami League

Tahzeeb Alam Siddique (Bengali: তাহজীব আলম সিদ্দিকী) is a Bangladesh Awami League politician and former Member of Parliament from Jhenaidah-2.

== Early life ==
Mr. Tahzeeb Alam Siddique was born on 23 July 1975. He successfully completed his master's degree in Public Administration, graduating from Cornell University in Ithaca, NewYork, USA in 2003. His father, Nur-E-Alam Siddique, was one of the four leaders (Caliph) of Bangladesh Chhatra League and he too was an Independent Member of Parliament.

== Career ==
Tahzeeb Alam Siddique was elected to Parliament on 5 January 2014 from Jhenaidah-2 as an independent candidate. Tahzeeb Alam Siddque is the Proprietor & Managing Director of Doreen Power Generations & Systems Limited, being given the contract to build a power plant in Singair Upazila named Manikganj Power Generations Limited. The company has been accused wrongly of disrupting the flow of Dhaleshwari River during construction of the power plant.
