= Kalicharanpur Union =

Kalicharanpur Union কালীচরণপুর ইউনিয়ন
- Union
- Dogachi Union
- Location within Bangladesh
- Coordinates: 23.5086°N 89.2045°E
- Country: Bangladesh
- Division: Khulna
- District: Jhenaidah
- Upazila: Jhenaidah Sadar

Area
  - Total: 16.9 km^{2} (6.5 sq mi)

Population (2011)
  - Total: 13,677
  - Density: 809/km^{2} (2,100/sq mi)
- Time zone: UTC+6 (BST)
- Website: kalicharanpurup.jhenaidah.gov.bd

Kalicharanpur Union (Bengali: কালীচরণপুর ইউনিয়ন) is a union parishad situated at Jhenaidah Sadar Upazila, in Jhenaidah District, Khulna Division of Bangladesh. The union has an area of 16.9 square kilometres (6.5 sq mi) and as of 2001 had a population of 13,677. There are 15 villages and 12 mouzas in the union.
