= Halidhani Union =

Halidhani Union হলিধানী ইউনিয়ন
- Union
- Halidhani Union
- Location within Bangladesh
- Coordinates: 23.5607°N 89.0827°E
- Country: Bangladesh
- Division: Khulna
- District: Jhenaidah
- Upazila: Jhenaidah Sadar

Area
  - Total: 52.55 km^{2} (20.29 sq mi)

Population (2011)
  - Total: 10,053
  - Density: 191.3/km^{2} (495.5/sq mi)
- Time zone: UTC+6 (BST)
- Website: dogachhiup.jhenaidah.gov.bd

Halidhani Union (Bengali: হলিধানী ইউনিয়ন) is a union parishad situated at Jhenaidah Sadar Upazila, in Jhenaidah District, Khulna Division of Bangladesh. The union has an area of 52.55 square kilometres (20.29 sq mi) and as of 2001 had a population of 10,053. There are 14 villages and 12 mouzas in the union.
