= Saganna Union =

Saganna Union সাগান্না ইউনিয়ন
- Union
- Saganna Union
- Location within Bangladesh
- Coordinates: 23.5640°N 89.0475°E
- Country: Bangladesh
- Division: Khulna
- District: Jhenaidah
- Upazila: Jhenaidah Sadar

Area
  - Total: 38.07 km^{2} (14.70 sq mi)

Population (2011)
  - Total: 20,978
  - Density: 551.0/km^{2} (1,427/sq mi)
- Time zone: UTC+6 (BST)
- Website: sagannaup.jhenaidah.gov.bd

Saganna Union (Bengali: সাগান্না ইউনিয়ন) is a union parishad of Jhenaidah Sadar Upazila, in Jhenaidah District, Khulna Division of Bangladesh. The union has an area of 38.07 square kilometres (14.70 sq mi) and as of 2001 had a population of 20,978. There are 5 villages and 5 mouzas in the union.
