= Paglakanai Union =

Paglakanai Union পাগলাকানাই ইউনিয়ন
- Union
- Paglakanai Union
- Location within Bangladesh
- Coordinates: 23.5344°N 89.1525°E
- Country: Bangladesh
- Division: Khulna
- District: Jhenaidah
- Upazila: Jhenaidah Sadar

Area
  - Total: 56.95 km^{2} (21.99 sq mi)

Population (2011)
  - Total: 15,172
  - Density: 266.4/km^{2} (690.0/sq mi)
- Time zone: UTC+6 (BST)
- Website: paglakanaiup.jhenaidah.gov.bd

Paglakanai Union (Bengali: পাগলাকানাই ইউনিয়ন) is a union parishad of Jhenaidah Sadar Upazila, in Jhenaidah District, Khulna Division of Bangladesh. The union has an area of 56.95 square kilometres (21.99 sq mi) and as of 2001 had a population of 15,172. There are 12 villages and 8 mouzas in the union.
