= Dakshin Madarsha Union =

Dakshin Madarsha Union bn:দক্ষিণ মাদার্শা ইউনিয়ন is a union of Hathazari Upazila of Chittagong District.

== Geography ==
Area of South Madarsha: 2,416 acres (9.78 km^{2}).

=== Location ===
North: North Madarsha Union

East: Raozan Upazila

South: Shikarpur Union

West: Chikandandi Union

== Demographics ==
At the 1991 census, South Madarsha union had a population of 16,722 and house units of 2587.

== Education ==
- South Madarsha S.S High School (Established 1965)
- Akboria School and college.
- South Madarsha Model Institute.
- Muzaffarabad Govt Primary School.
- Rahmania Govt Primary School.
- Akbaria Govt Primary School.
- Nobabia Govt Primary School.
- Akbar Shah Sunnia Dakhil Madrasa
