= Kumrabaria Union =

Kumrabaria Union কুমড়াবাড়ীয়া ইউনিয়ন
- Union
- Kumrabaria Union
- Location within Bangladesh
- Coordinates: 23.5366°N 89.1067°E
- Country: Bangladesh
- Division: Khulna
- District: Jhenaidah
- Upazila: Jhenaidah Sadar

Area
  - Total: 24.6 km^{2} (9.5 sq mi)

Population (2011)
  - Total: 17,767
  - Density: 722/km^{2} (1,870/sq mi)
- Time zone: UTC+6 (BST)
- Website: kumrabariaup.jhenaidah.gov.bd

Kumrabaria Union (Bengali: কুমড়াবাড়ীয়া ইউনিয়ন) is a union parishad of Jhenaidah Sadar Upazila, in Jhenaidah District, Khulna Division of Bangladesh. The union has an area of 24.6 square kilometres (9.5 sq mi) and as of 2001 had a population of 17,767. There are 13 villages and 10 mouzas in the union.
