= Farid Ahmad Choudhury =

Bengali politician

Member of the Bengal Legislative Assembly
- In office 14 May 1946 – 1947
- Preceded by: Sana Ullah
- Constituency: Chittagong North-East

Member of the East Bengal Legislative Assembly
- In office 1947–1954

Personal details
- Born: July 22, 1908 Gahira, Chittagong District, Bengal Presidency
- Died: January 7, 1975 (aged 66)
- Party: Bengal Provincial Muslim League
- Children: 0
- Occupation: Politician

Farid Ahmad Choudhury (22 July 1908 — 7 January 1975) was a Bangladeshi politician. He was a member of the Bengal Legislative Assembly.

== Early life and family ==
Chowdhury was born on 22 July 1908 to a Bengali family of Muslim zamindar in Gahira, Raozan, located in the Chittagong District of the Bengal Presidency (now Bangladesh). He was a relative of politicians Fazlul Qadir Chaudhry and AKM Fazlul Kabir Chowdhury.

== Career ==
Choudhury was a member of the Bengal Provincial Muslim League. He was elected a member of the Legislative Assembly (MLA) of Bengal for the Chittagong North-East constituency (Fatikchhari-Rauzan-Hathazari) in the 1946 elections. Choudhury renounced his title of Khan Bahadur and Companion of the Order of the Indian Empire award given to him by the British Raj to protest against the atrocities committed by the British on the people of Panchlaish and he also resigned from the MLA post.

== Death ==
Chowdhury died on 7 January 1975, with no children.
