= Harishongkorpur Union =

Harishongkorpur Union হরিশংকরপুর ইউনিয়ন
- Union
- Dogachi Union
- Location within Bangladesh
- Coordinates: 23.5593°N 89.3030°E
- Country: Bangladesh
- Division: Khulna
- District: Jhenaidah
- Upazila: Jhenaidah Sadar

Area
  - Total: 69.88 km^{2} (26.98 sq mi)

Population (2011)
  - Total: 17,417
  - Density: 249.2/km^{2} (645.5/sq mi)
- Time zone: UTC+6 (BST)
- Website: harishongkorpurup.jhenaidah.gov.bd

Harishongkorpur Union (Bengali: হরিশংকরপুর ইউনিয়ন) is a union parishad of Jhenaidah Sadar Upazila, in Jhenaidah District, Khulna Division of Bangladesh. The union has an area of 69.88 square kilometres (26.98 sq mi) and as of 2001 had a population of 17,417. There are 22 villages and 21 mouzas in the union.
