= Mashiur Rahman (Jhenaidah politician) =

Bangladeshi politician (1953–2022)

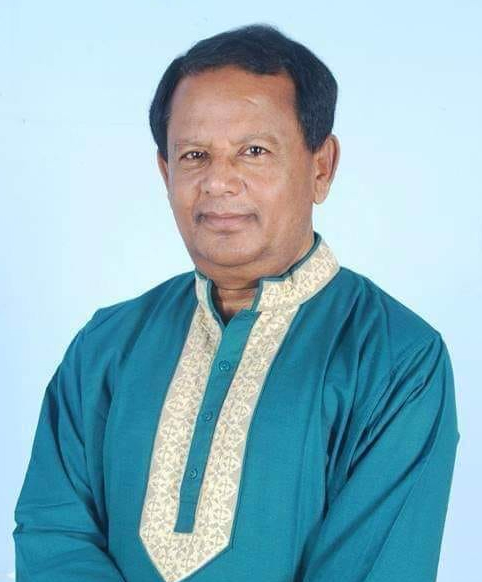

Member of Bangladesh Parliament

Personal details
- Born: 25 June 1953 Kanyadah, Harinakunda Upazila, East Bengal
- Died: 1 November 2022 (aged 69) Jhenaidah, Bangladesh
- Party: Bangladesh Nationalist Party

Mashiur Rahman (25 June 1953 – 1 November 2022) was a Bangladeshi independence activist and Bangladesh Nationalist Party politician who served as a member of parliament for Jhenaidah-2.

== Career ==
Rahman was elected to parliament from Jhenaidah-2 as a Bangladesh Nationalist Party candidate in 1991, 1996, and 2001. He was the president of the Jhenaidah District unit of Bangladesh Nationalist Party. In 2017, he was sentenced to ten years imprisonment by a Jhenaidah District court for concealing information about his wealth.

== Personal life and death ==
Rahman died from heart attack at his Jhenaidah residence, on 1 November 2022, at the age of 69.
