= Anisul Islam Mahmud =

Bangladeshi diplomat and politician (born 1947)

- আনিসুল ইসলাম মাহমুদ
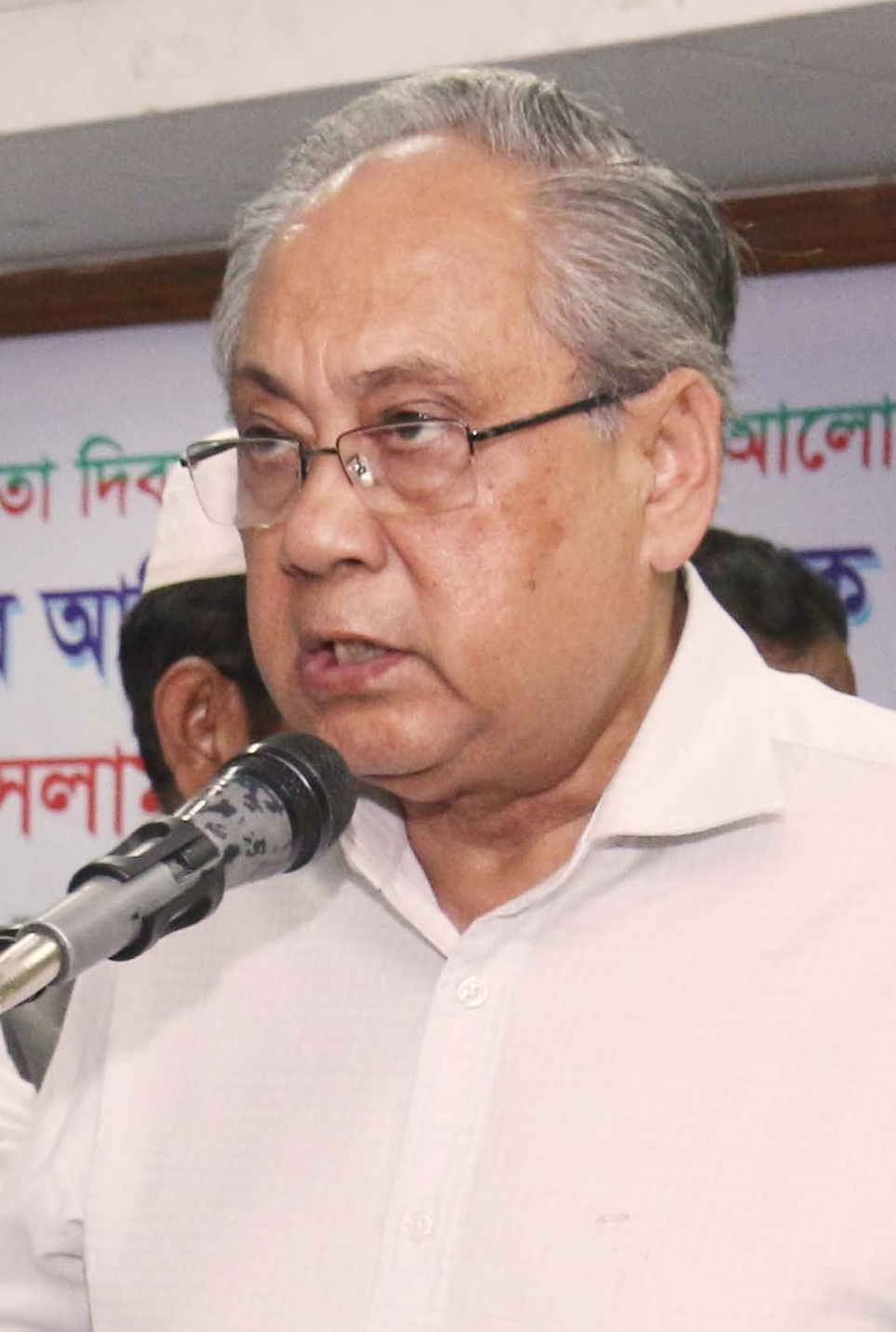
- Mahmud in 2018

Minister of Foreign Affairs
- In office July 1985 – 6 December 1990
- Prime Minister: Mizanur Rahman Chowdhury; Moudud Ahmed; Kazi Zafar Ahmed
- Preceded by: Humayun Rashid Choudhury
- Succeeded by: Fakhruddin Ahmed

Minister of Water Resources
- In office 2014–2018
- Prime Minister: Sheikh Hasina
- Preceded by: Sultan Ahmed
- Succeeded by: Mahbubur Rahman

Minister of Education
- In office 27 March 1988 – 10 December 1988
- Prime Minister: Moudud Ahmed
- Preceded by: Mahbubur Rahman
- Succeeded by: Sheikh Shahidul Islam

Minister of Information and Broadcasting
- In office 24 January 1988 – 27 March 1988
- Prime Minister: Mizanur Rahman Chowdhury
- Preceded by: Anwar Zahid
- Succeeded by: Mahbubur Rahman

Member of the Bangladesh Parliament for Chittagong-5
- In office 25 January 2009 – 6 August 2024
- Preceded by: Syed Wahidul Alam
- Succeeded by: Mir Mohammed Helal Uddin
- In office 7 May 1986 – 6 December 1990
- Preceded by: Abdul Wahab
- Succeeded by: Syed Wahidul Alam

Personal details
- Born: 20 December 1947 (age 78) Chittagong District, East Bengal, Dominion of Pakistan
- Party: Jatiya Party
- Education: Faujdarhat Cadet College; University of Dhaka; Quaid-i-Azam University; University of Essex

Anisul Islam Mahmud (born 20 December 1947) is a Bangladeshi barrister, economist, diplomat and politician. He served as the former minister of environment and forest and minister of water resources in the Cabinet of Bangladesh in the third Hasina ministry from 2014 to 2019. He previously served as minister of foreign affairs from July 1985 to December 1990 under President Hussain Muhammad Ershad.

== Early life ==
Mahmud was educated at the University of Dhaka (BA, economics, 1969), Quaide Azam University in Karachi (MSc, economics) and the University of Essex (MA, economics, 1972). He was called to the Bar at Lincoln's Inn in 1975. He was a lecturer of economics at the University of Dhaka from 1969 to 1970, a senior research associate in economics at the University of East Anglia from 1972 to 1973, and a lecturer of economics at the University of Hertfordshire from 1973 to 1977.

== Career ==
Mahmud became a Jatiya Sangsad member representing the Chittagong-5 constituency in 1979, and was re-elected in 1986 and 1988. He ran again in the June 1996 general election, but lost to the incumbent, Syed Wahidul Alam. He became the MP for Chittagong-5 in 2008, was elected unopposed to Chittagong-5 in 2014, and was re-elected in 2018 and 2024. He was the president of the Bangladesh Cricket Board. He also served as minister in the Ministry of Foreign Affairs in 1986, the Ministry of Education, the Ministry of Water Resources from 2014 to 2018, and the Ministry of Environment and Forestry from 2018 to 2019. He also served as panel speaker of the Jatiya Sangsad from 2024 to 8 August 2024 he was deputy leader of opposition in Jatiya Sangsad.

In July 2025 Mahmud was dismissed from all posts of the Jatiya Party (Ershad), where he served as senior co-chairman of the party. Currently he has floated his own faction of the Jatiya Party, where Mahmud is appointed as chairman, Kazi Firoz Rashid as a senior co-chairman, Mujibul Haque Chunnu as executive chairman and A.B.M. Ruhul Amin Howlader as secretary general of the Jatiya Party (Anis) faction.

== Personal life ==
Mahmud is married to Parveen, former Deputy Managing Director of Palli Karma Sahayak Foundation. His daughter is married to Javed Husein, son of Mainul Hosein.
