= Chittagong-5 =

Constituency of Bangladesh's Jatiya Sangsad

Coordinates: 22.41°N 91.82°E

- Constituency for the Jatiya Sangsad
- District: Chittagong District
- Division: Chittagong Division
- Electorate: 501,916 (2026)

Current constituency
- Created: 1973
- Party: Bangladesh Nationalist Party
- Member: Mir Mohammed Helal Uddin
- ← 281 Chittagong-4 283 Chittagong-6 →

Chittagong-5 is a constituency represented in the Jatiya Sangsad (National Parliament) of Bangladesh since 2026 by Mir Mohammed Helal Uddin of the Bangladesh Nationalist Party.

== Boundaries ==
The constituency encompasses Hathazari Upazila and Chittagong City Corporation wards 1 and 2.

== History ==
The constituency was created for the first general elections in newly independent Bangladesh, held in 1973.

Ahead of the 2014 general election, the Election Commission shifted the boundaries of the constituency. Previously it had encompassed Raozan Upazila and only one union parishad of Hathazari Upazila: Garduara.

== Members of Parliament ==
Election	Member	Party
1973	Abdul Wahab	Awami League
1979	Anisul Islam Mahmud	Bangladesh Nationalist Party
1986	Anisul Islam Mahmud	Jatiya Party
1988	Anisul Islam Mahmud	Jatiya Party
1991	Syed Wahidul Alam	Bangladesh Nationalist Party
Feb 1996	Syed Wahidul Alam	Bangladesh Nationalist Party
Jun 1996	Syed Wahidul Alam	Bangladesh Nationalist Party
2001	Syed Wahidul Alam	Bangladesh Nationalist Party
Major Boundary Changes
2008	A. B. M. Fazle Karim Chowdhury	Awami League
Major Boundary Changes
2014	Anisul Islam Mahmud	Jatiya Party (Ershad)
2018	Anisul Islam Mahmud	Jatiya Party (Ershad)
2024	Anisul Islam Mahmud	Jatiya Party (Ershad)
2026	Mir Mohammed Helal Uddin	Bangladesh Nationalist Party

== Elections ==
=== Elections in the 2020s ===
General Election 2026: Chittagong-5 (Note: The smallest four vote counts may have been published while ballots were still being counted, before postal ballots were received, and before official results were announced.)
Party	Candidate	Votes	%	±%
BNP	Mir Mohammed Helal Uddin	147,054	70.6	N/A
Bangladesh Khelafat Majlis	Nasiruddin Munir	46,589	22.4	N/A
Islamic Front	Muhammad Rafiqul Islam	12,225	5.9	N/A
IAB	Mati Ullah Noori	1,319	0.6	N/A
Labour	Md. Ala Uddin	857	0.4	N/A
Independent	Mohammad Imam Uddin Riyadh	207	0.1	N/A
Majority		100,465	48.2	N/A
Turnout		208,251	41.5	N/A
Registered electors		501,916		
BNP gain from JP(E)				

=== Elections in the 2010s ===
General Election 2018: Chattogram-5
Party	Symbol	Candidate	Votes	%	±pp
JP(E)	Plough	Anisul Islam Mahmud	277,909	82.85	N/A
BKP	Sheaf of paddy	Syed Muhammad Ibrahim	44,381	13.24	N/A
BIF	Candle	Md. Nayeemul Islam	8,741	2.61	N/A
IFB	Chair	Sayed Hafiz Ahmed	1,745	0.52	N/A
IAB	Hand fan	Mohammad Rafiq	1,419	0.42	N/A
Independent	Lion	Mohammad Nasir Haider Karim	537	0.16	N/A
IOJ	Minaret	Moin Uddin Ruhi	375	0.11	N/A
BKA	Banyan	Mir Idris	127	0.04	N/A
KM	Wall clock	Shihabuddin	109	0.03	N/A
JUIB	Date palm	Md. Nasir Uddin	79	0.02	N/A
Valid votes			335,422	97.92	
Invalid votes			7,114	2.08	
Total votes			342,536	100.0	
Registered voters/turnout			430,124	79.64	
Majority			233,528	69.62	
Jatiya Party (Ershad) hold					

Anisul Islam Mahmud was elected unopposed in the 2014 general election after opposition parties withdrew their candidacies in a boycott of the election.

=== Elections in the 2000s ===
General Election 2008: Chittagong-5
Party	Candidate	Votes	%	±%
AL	A. B. M. Fazle Karim Chowdhury	86,606	52.4	+7.6
BNP	Giasuddin Quader Chowdhury	78,711	47.6	−3.4
Majority		7,895	4.8	−1.3
Turnout		165,317	78.7	+6.0
AL gain from BNP				

General Election 2001: Chittagong-5
Party	Candidate	Votes	%	±%
BNP	Syed Wahidul Alam	84,063	51.0	+3.6
AL	Md. Ibrahim Hossain Chowdhury	73,938	44.8	+9.6
BIF	Abul Bashar Siddiqi	4,854	2.9	+1.3
IJOF	Nazim Uddin Chowdhury	1,895	1.2	N/A
Independent	Syed Md. Musa Kalimullah	195	0.1	N/A
Majority		10,125	6.1	−6.1
Turnout		164,945	72.7	+2.8
BNP hold				

=== Elections in the 1990s ===
General Election June 1996: Chittagong-5
Party	Candidate	Votes	%	±%
BNP	Syed Wahidul Alam	57,010	47.4	−8.1
AL	Md. Abdus Salam	42,311	35.2	−3.6
JP(E)	Anisul Islam Mahmud	12,964	10.8	+8.4
Jamaat	Mohammad Omar Faruk	5,075	4.2	N/A
BIF	Syed Md. Rafiqul Islam	1,914	1.6	−0.4
BKA	Mohammad Abdur Razzak	560	0.5	−0.3
Gano Forum	Ratan Roy	250	0.2	N/A
Zaker Party	Nowab Miah	170	0.1	−0.2
Majority		11,939	12.2	−4.5
Turnout		120,254	69.9	+17.6
BNP hold				

General Election 1991: Chittagong-5
Party	Candidate	Votes	%	±%
BNP	Syed Wahidul Alam	56,469	55.5	
AL	Md. Nazim Uddin	39,471	38.8	
JP(E)	Md. Abdulla Al Mamun	2,400	2.4	
BIF	Yunus Company	1,999	2.0	
BKA	Md. Habibullah	850	0.8	
NDP	A. K. M. Ah. Chowdhury	308	0.3	
Zaker Party	Nowab Miah	283	0.3	
Majority		16,998	16.7	
Turnout		101,780	52.3	
BNP gain from JP(E)				
