= Ghorshal Union =

Ghorshal Union ঘোড়শাল ইউনিয়ন
- Union
- Ghorshal Union
- Location within Bangladesh
- Coordinates: 23.4855°N 89.2509°E
- Country: Bangladesh
- Division: Khulna
- District: Jhenaidah
- Upazila: Jhenaidah Sadar

Area
  - Total: 56.95 km^{2} (21.99 sq mi)

Population (2011)
  - Total: 15,175
  - Density: 266.5/km^{2} (690.1/sq mi)
- Time zone: UTC+6 (BST)
- Website: ghorshalup.jhenaidah.gov.bd

Ghorshal Union (Bengali: ঘোড়শাল ইউনিয়ন) is a union parishad situated at Jhenaidah Sadar Upazila, in Jhenaidah District, Khulna Division of Bangladesh. The union has an area of 56.95 square kilometres (21.99 sq mi) and as of 2001 had a population of 15,172. There are 14 villages and 8 mouzas in the union.
