= Chhibatali Union =

Union in Chittagong District, Bangladesh

Chipatoli Union (Bengali: ছিপাতলী) is a union in Hathazari Upazila, Chittagong District, Bangladesh. It has an area of 1,092 acres (4.42 km^{2}) and, as of the 1991 census, a population of 6,959. There are two villages in the union, Chipatali and Kazirkhil, and one mouza. Chipatali Madrasha, Eidgah Multilateral High School and College, five government primary schools and a few Islamic institutions are located in the area.
