= Naldanga Union =

Naldanga Union নলডাঙ্গা ইউনিয়ন
- Union
- Naldanga Union
- Location within Bangladesh
- Coordinates: 23.4414°N 89.1664°E
- Country: Bangladesh
- Division: Khulna
- District: Jhenaidah
- Upazila: Jhenaidah Sadar

Area
  - Total: 88.03 km^{2} (33.99 sq mi)

Population (2011)
  - Total: 28,813
  - Density: 327.3/km^{2} (847.7/sq mi)
- Time zone: UTC+6 (BST)
- Website: naldangaup.jhenaidah.gov.bd

Naldanga Union (Bengali: নলডাঙ্গা ইউনিয়ন) is a union parishad of Jhenaidah Sadar Upazila, in Jhenaidah District, Khulna Division of Bangladesh. The union has an area of 88.03 square kilometres (33.99 sq mi) and as of 2001 had a population of 19,386. There are 22 villages and 18 mouzas in the union. Naldanga Union Parishad is located in the village of Naldanga.
