= Fursondi Union =

Fursondi Union ফুরসন্দি ইউনিয়ন
- Union
- Fursondi Union
- Location within Bangladesh
- Coordinates: 23.4921°N 89.2932°E
- Country: Bangladesh
- Division: Khulna
- District: Jhenaidah
- Upazila: Jhenaidah Sadar

Area
  - Total: 38.07 km^{2} (14.70 sq mi)

Population (2011)
  - Total: 17,288
  - Density: 454.1/km^{2} (1,176/sq mi)
- Time zone: UTC+6 (BST)
- Website: furshondiup.jhenaidah.gov.bd

Fursondi Union (Bengali: ফুরসন্দি ইউনিয়ন) is a union parishad of Jhenaidah Sadar Upazila, in Jhenaidah District, Khulna Division of Bangladesh. The union has an area of 38.07 square kilometres (14.70 sq mi) and as of 2001 had a population of 17,288. There are 15 villages and 12 mouzas in the union.
