= Md. Shafiqul Islam =

Bangladeshi politician

Member of Bangladesh Parliament

Personal details
- Born: 1 January 1965 (age 61)
- Party: Bangladesh Awami League
- Occupation: Businessman

Md. Shafiqul Islam is a Bangladesh Awami League politician and a former member of parliament for Jhenaidah-2.

== Biography ==
Shafiqul Islaw was born on 1 January 1965. He completed a Master of Social Science degree.

Shafiqul Islam was elected to parliament from Jhenaidah-2 as a Bangladesh Awami League candidate in 2008.
