= Maharazpur Union, Jhenaidah Sadar =

Maharazpur Union মহারাজপুর ইউনিয়ন
- Union
- Maharazpur Union
- Location within Bangladesh
- Coordinates: 23.4779°N 89.1439°E
- Country: Bangladesh
- Division: Khulna
- District: Jhenaidah
- Upazila: Jhenaidah Sadar

Area
  - Total: 38.07 km^{2} (14.70 sq mi)

Population (2011)
  - Total: 28,813
  - Density: 756.8/km^{2} (1,960/sq mi)
- Time zone: UTC+6 (BST)
- Website: maharazpurup.jhenaidah.gov.bd

Maharazpur Union (Bengali: মহারাজপুর ইউনিয়ন) is a union parishad of Jhenaidah Sadar Upazila, in Jhenaidah District, Khulna Division of Bangladesh. The union has an area of 38.07 square kilometres (14.70 sq mi) and as of 2001 had a population of 25,813. There are 22 villages and 21 mouzas in the union.
