= Fatehpur Union (Hathazari) =

Union council of Hathazari Upazila, Bangladesh

Coordinates: 22.471°N 91.815°E

Fatehpur Union (Bengali: ফতেপুর ইউনিয়ন) is a union of Hathazari Upazila of Chittagong District, Bangladesh.

== Geography ==
Total area: 5,668 acres (22.94 km^{2})

== Location ==
North: Mekhal Union

East: North Madarsha Union

South: Chikandandi Union

West: Sitakunda Upazila

== Population ==
According to the 2011 Bangladesh census, Fatehpur Union had a total population of 45,500 with 23,582 Males and 21,918 Females.

== Marketplaces and bazaars ==
Madanhat, Islamiahat, Nondirhat, 1 No. Railgate Bazaar, South Campus Bou Bazaar, and Chittagong University 2 No. Gate Bazaar

== Education ==
- Chittagong University
- Fatehpur Mehernega High School (established 1968)
