= Syed Wahidul Alam =

Bangladeshi politician

- সৈয়দ ওয়াহিদুল আলম

Member of the Bangladesh Parliament for Chittagong-5
- In office 27 February 1991 – 29 October 2006
- Preceded by: Anisul Islam Mahmud
- Succeeded by: Anisul Islam Mahmud

Personal details
- Born: 1945 or 1946 Chittagong, Bengal Province, British India
- Died: 27 May 2018 (aged 72) Chittagong, Bangladesh
- Party: Bangladesh Nationalist Party
- Children: Shakila Farzana

Syed Wahidul Alam (1945/1946 – 27 May 2018) was a Bangladesh Nationalist Party politician and a four-term Jatiya Sangsad member representing the Chittagong-5 constituency durign 1991–2006.

== Career ==
Alam was an active Liberation War activist during 1971. He was first elected to Jatiya Sangsad representing the Chittagong-5 (Hathazari) constituency on 27 February 1991. He was also the whip of the parliament.

== Personal life ==
Alam had two daughters. Elder daughter, Shakila Farzana, is a barrister and a Jatiya Sangsad member elected from the reserved women's seat in May 2026. She served as the joint general secretary of the Supreme Court wing of Bangladesh Jatiyatabadi Ainjibi Oikya Parishad, a pro-BNP lawyers’ body.
