= Farhadabad Union =

Coordinates: 22.618°N 91.794°E

Farhadabad Union (Bengali: ফরহাদাবাদ) is a union of Hathazari Upazila of Chittagong District, Bangladesh.

== Geography ==
Area of Farhadabad: 12,387 acres (5,013 ha).

Forhadabad Union is two part which is divided by Dhalai union One part is located:

North: Fatikchori Upazila

East: Fatikchori Upozila

South: Dhalai Union

West: Sitakunda Upazila

== Population ==
As of 1991 Bangladesh census, Farhadabad union has a population of 23,030 and house units 3,734.

== Marketplaces and bazars ==
Basir Hat Bazar, Zabbar Hat, Nurali Mear Hat Bazar, Nazirhat Bazar

== Education ==
High Schools and Madrashas

- Nazirhat collegiate High School
- Forhadabad High School
- Mohammadia Dhakil Madrasha

Colleges

- Nazirhat university College
