= Jhenaidah Sadar Upazila =

Jhenidah Sadar ঝিনাইদহ সদর
- Upazila
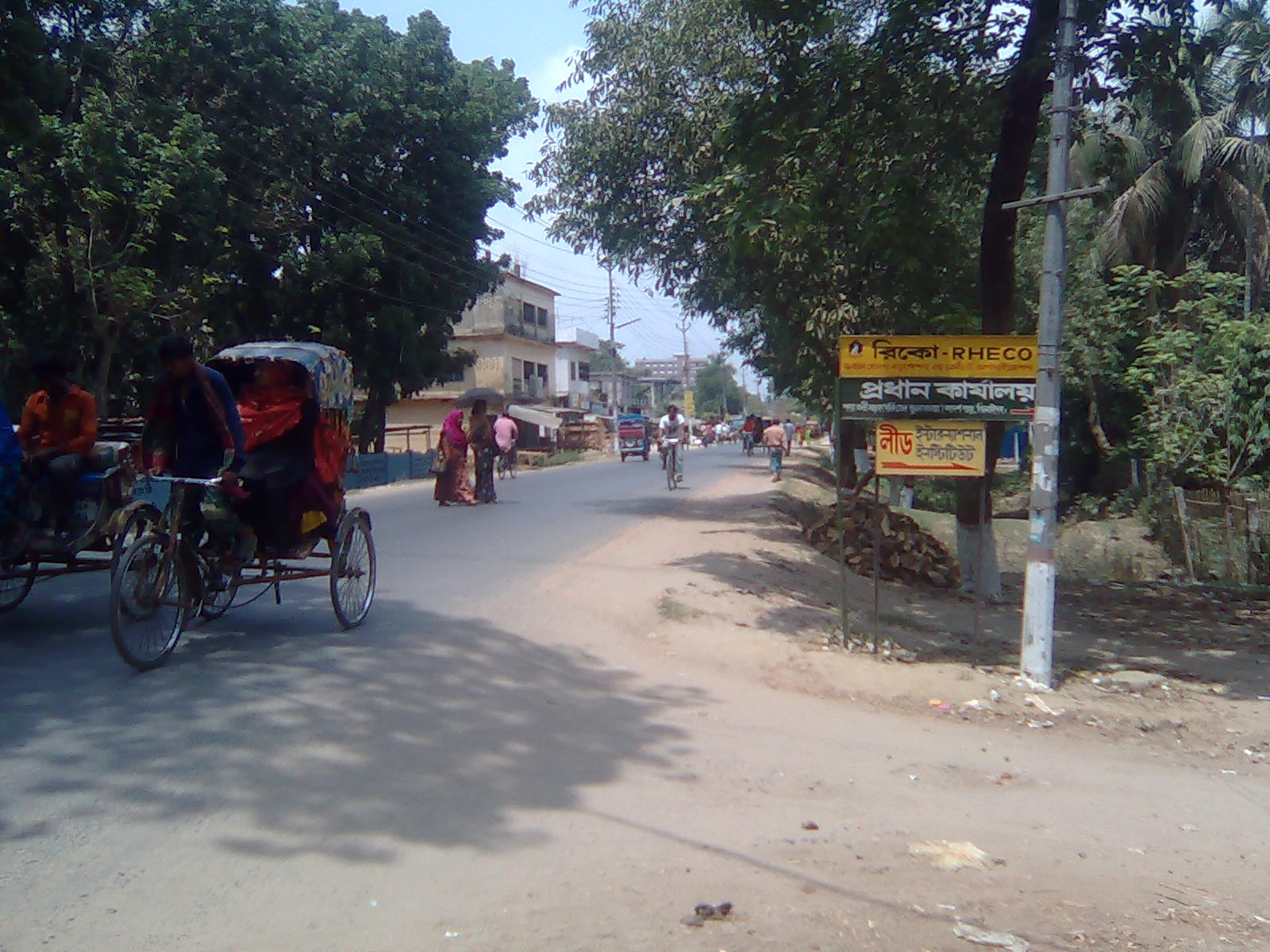
- Roads in Jhenaidah

- Coordinates: 23°32.5′N 89°11′E
- Country: Bangladesh
- Division: Khulna
- District: Jhenaidah
- Headquarters: Jhenaidah

Area
  - Total: 470.11 km^{2} (181.51 sq mi)

Population (2022)
  - Total: 543,906
  - Density: 1,157.0/km^{2} (2,996.6/sq mi)
- Time zone: UTC+6 (BST)
- Postal code: 7300
- Area code: 0451
- Website: Official Map of Jhenaidah Sadar

Jhenaidah Sadar Upazila mauza geocode map

Jhenidah Sadar (Bengali: ঝিনাইদহ সদর) is an upazila of Jhenaidah District in Khulna, Bangladesh.

== Geography ==
Jhenidah Sadar is located at 23.5417°N 89.1833°E. It has a total area of 470.11 km^{2}.

== Demographics ==
Historical population
Year	Pop. (000)	±%
1981	272	—
1991	333	+22.4%
2001	394	+18.3%
2011	456	+15.7%
2022	544	+19.3%
Source: Bangladesh Bureau of Statistics

Religions in Jhenaidah Sadar Upazila (2022)
Religion	Percent
Islam	90.85%
Hinduism	9.13%
Other or not stated	0.02%

According to the 2022 Bangladeshi census, Jhenaidah Sadar Upazila had 141,521 households and a population of 543,906. 8.52% of the population were under 5 years of age. Jhenaidah Sadar had a literacy rate (age 7 and over) of 75.18%: 77.87% for males and 72.54% for females, and a sex ratio of 98.89 males for every 100 females. 162,665 (29.91%) lived in urban areas.

As of the 2011 Census of Bangladesh, Jhenaidah Sadar upazila had 108,924 households and a population of 455,932. 89,325 (19.59%) were under 10 years of age. Jhenaidah Sadar had an average literacy rate of 51.8%, compared to the national average of 51.8%, and a sex ratio of 998 females per 1000 males. 110,541 (24.25%) of the population lived in urban areas.

== Points of interest ==
Naldanga Temple Complex, in the Jhenaidah Sadar Upazila, is a temple complex built in 1656 by Maharaj Indranarayan Debroy. There are a total of six temples now. The government restored all of them in 1980 but they were destroyed again during a riot and now most of them are in ruins. Renovations are still going on. The idol of goddess Kali was from Banaras, India.

== Administration ==
Jhenaidah Sadar Upazila is divided into Jhenaidah Municipality and 17 union parishads: Dogachi, Fursondi, Ganna, Ghorshal, Halidhani, Harishongkorpur, Kalicharanpur, Kumrabaria,Maharazpur, Modhuhati, Naldanga, padmakar, Paglakanai, Porahati, Sadhuhati, Saganna, and Surat. The union parishads are subdivided into 268 mauzas and 284 villages.

Jhenaidah Municipality is subdivided into 9 wards and 34 mahallas.

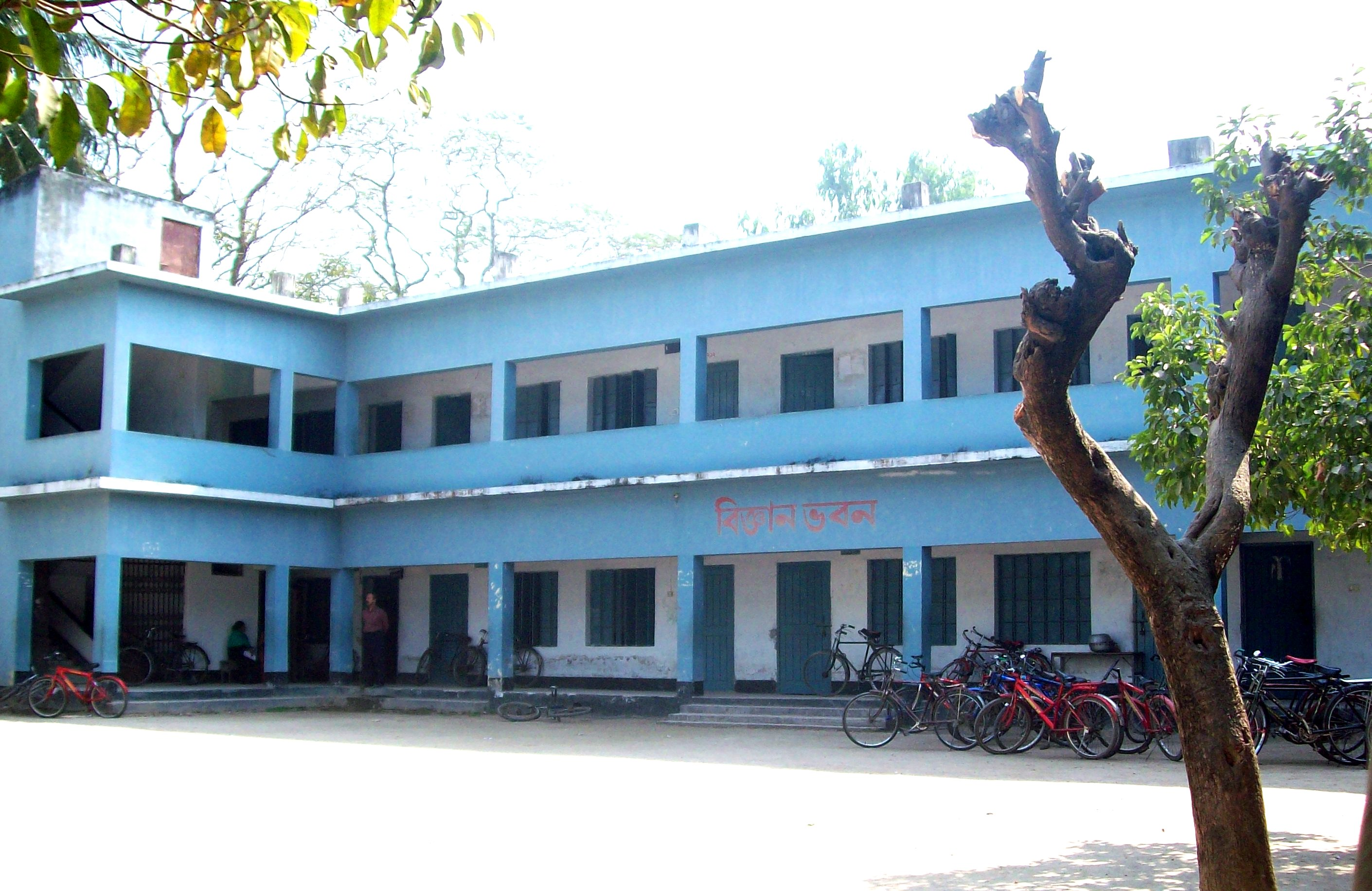
Kanchannagar Model School and College was founded in 1973.

== Education ==
There are 15 colleges in the upazila. They include Amena Khatun College, Government Nurunnahar Mohila College, founded in 1985, and Jhenaidah College. Government KC College, founded in 1960, is the only masters level one.

According to Banglapedia, Jhenaidah Government Girls' High School, founded in 1954, Jhenaidah Government High School (1877), Kanchannagar Model School and College (1973), and Wazir Ali High School (1903) are notable secondary schools.

The madrasa education system includes one kamil madrasa.

== See also ==
- Upazilas of Bangladesh
- Districts of Bangladesh
- Divisions of Bangladesh
- Administrative geography of Bangladesh
