= Halda River =

Coordinates: 22°25′N 91°53′E

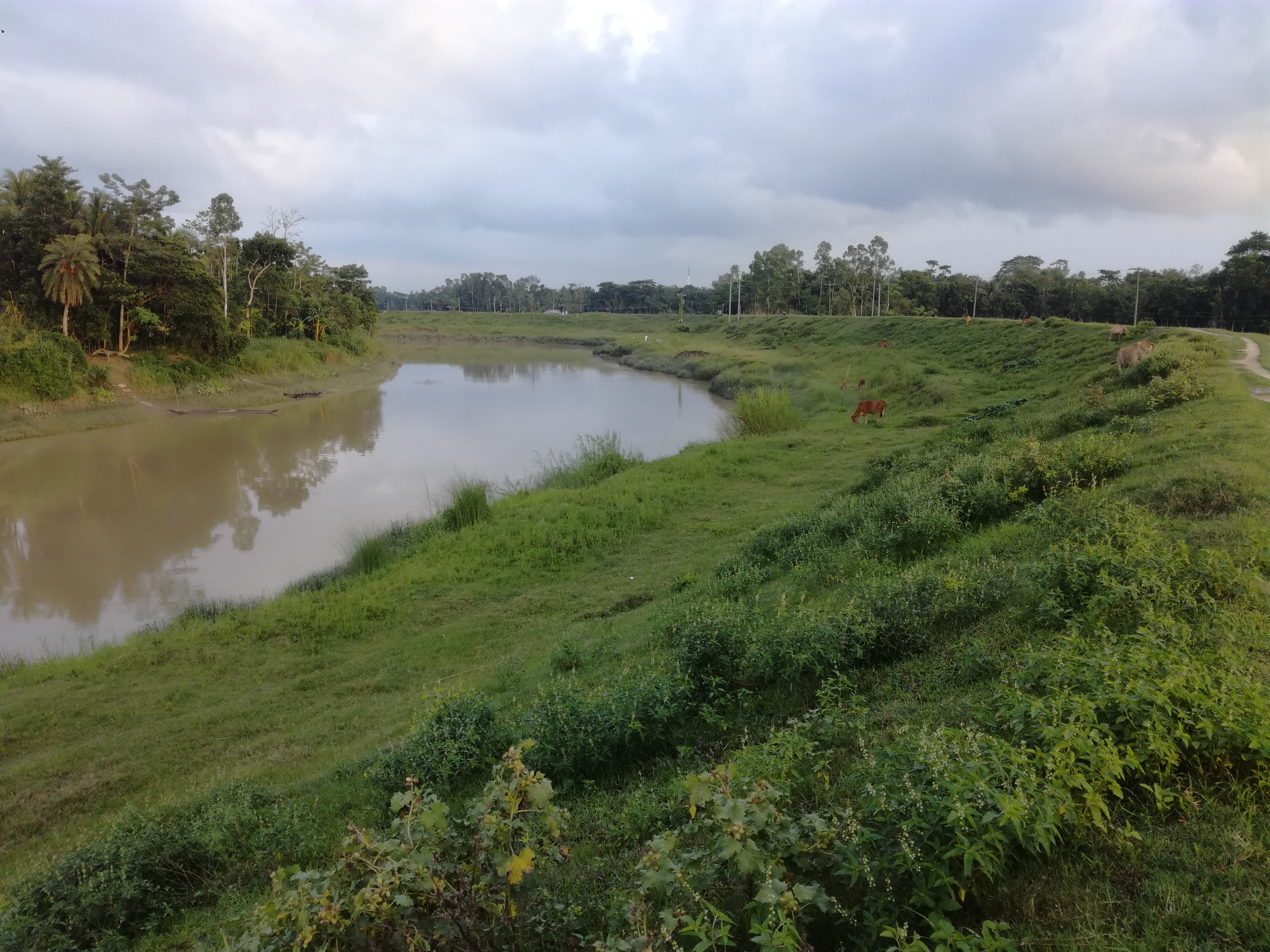

Physical characteristics
- Length: 81 km (50 mi)

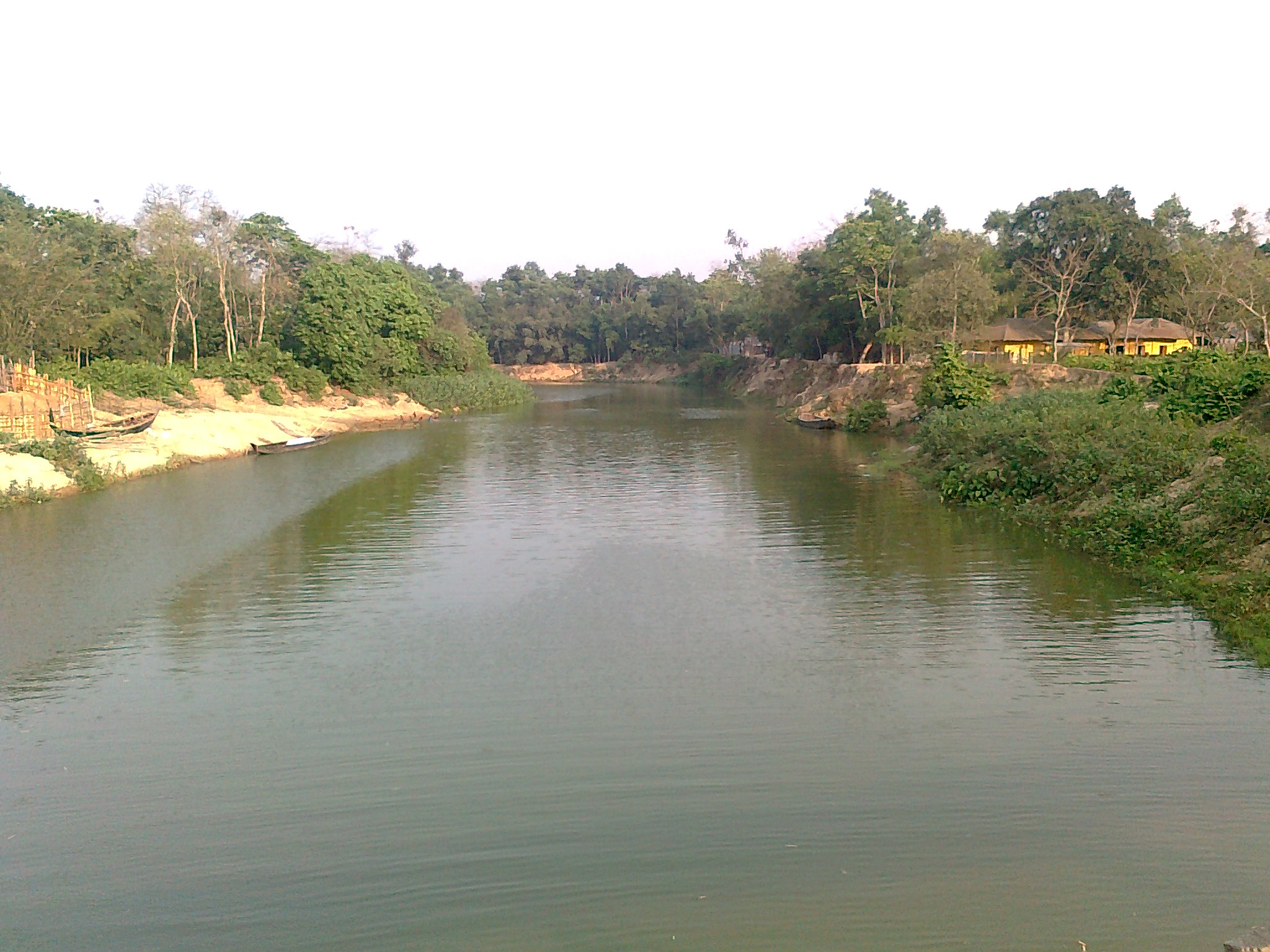
Halda River near Narayan Hat

Halda River is a river in south-eastern Bangladesh. It originates at the Badnatali Hill Ranges in Ramgarh Upazila in the Chittagong Hill Tracts, flows through Fatikchhari Upazila, Bhujpur Thana, Hathazari Upazila, Raozan Upazila and Chandgaon Thana of the Chittagong Metropolitan City, and falls into the Karnaphuli River. The 81-kilometre-long (50 mi) river has a very turbulent tributary, the Dhurung River, which joins Purba Dhalai about 48 kilometres (30 mi) downstream. The river is navigable by big boats 29 km (18 mi) from its mouth up to Nazir Hat, and by small boats 16–24 kilometres (9.9–14.9 mi) further up to Narayanhat. The Halda averages 21 feet (6.4 m) in depth and is 30 feet (9.1 m) at its deepest point.

The Halda river is also famous for breeding pure Indian carp. This is the only pure Indian carp breeding field of Bangladesh, perhaps in South Asia. On December 22, 2020, the Bangladeshi government declared the Halda River as Bangabandhu Fisheries Heritage due to the significance of the river.

== See also ==
- List of rivers in Bangladesh
