= Ashurhat =

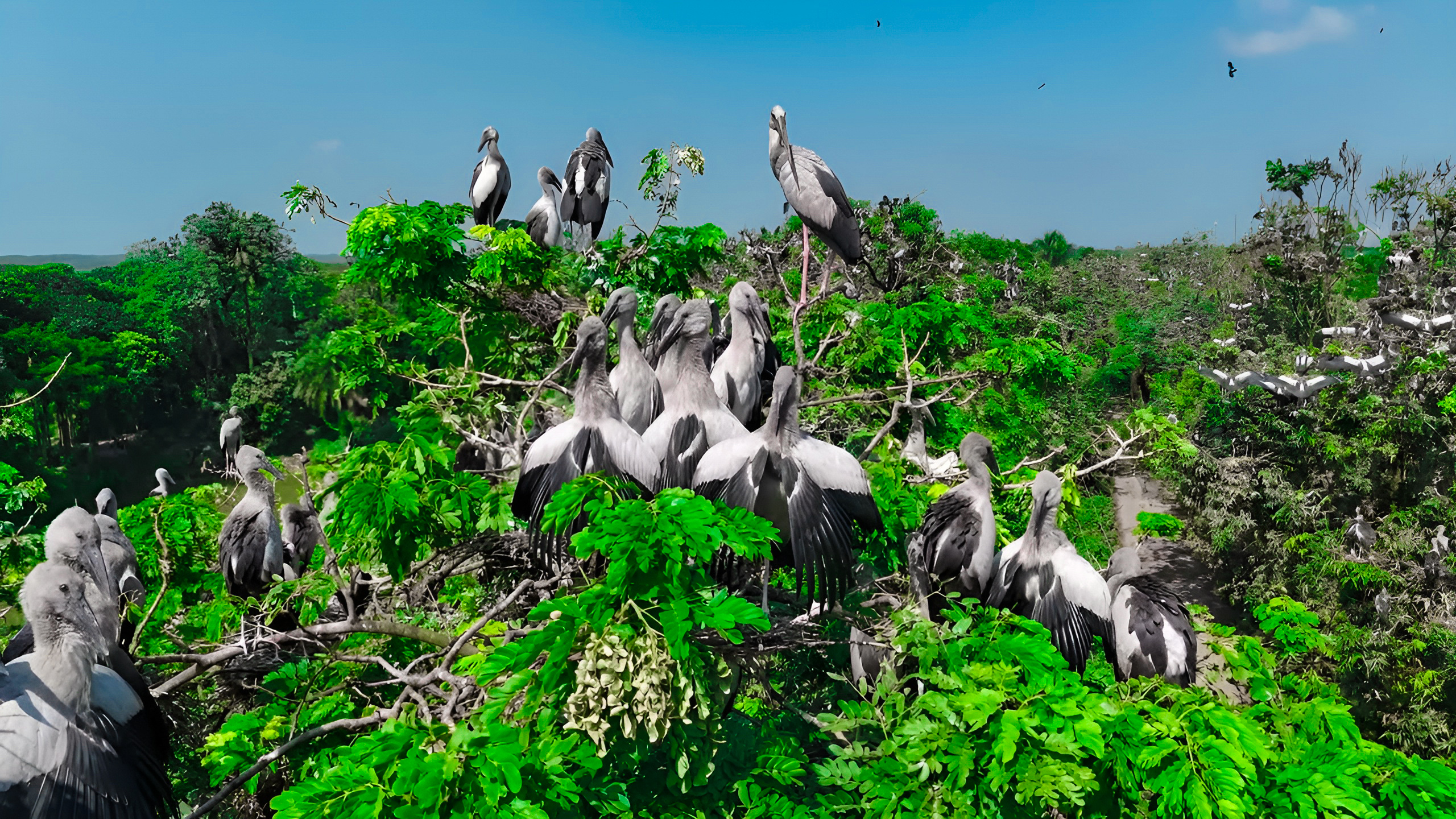
- Nickname: Bird Village
- Interactive map of Ashurhat
- Country: Bangladesh
- Division: Khulna Division
- District: Jhenaidah District
- Upazila: Shailkupa Upazila
- Union: Nityanandapur Union
- Recognition as Bird Village: December 2007; 18 years ago
- Postal code: 7320

Ashurhat is a village in Shailkupa Upazila of Jhenaidah District, Bangladesh. It is widely known as the “Bird Village” of Bangladesh due to the large number of migratory and local birds that inhabit the area.

== Known as the Bird Village ==
Ashurhat village is located in Nityanandapur Union of Shailkupa Upazila, about 14 kilometers from the upazila headquarters. Once an ordinary rural area, the village gained fame in the winter of 2007 when a flock of migratory birds, resembling storks, began nesting on a large silk-cotton tree in nearby Shamukhkhola village. Every morning the birds would fly out in search of food and return by evening to roost on the same tree. This pattern continued each winter until 2012.

However, in 2013, the birds broke their pattern — they did not migrate back. Instead, they made permanent nests on the silk-cotton tree, laid eggs, and began breeding locally. Soon, neighboring trees also became occupied, and within a few years, thousands of birds had settled across the village.

During winter, thousands of migratory birds visit Ashurhat, filling the air with their calls. The long-beaked birds, similar to herons, are locally known as “Shamukvhanga.” Although they used to migrate back after winter, in recent years many have stayed year-round — nesting, laying eggs, and raising chicks — turning Ashurhat into a true “Bird Village.”

== Bird population ==
Currently, the number of migratory birds in Ashurhat is estimated to be around 6,000–7,000. Additionally, around 4,000–5,000 native birds — including mynas, doves, and egrets — can be seen in the surrounding ponds and fields.

== Location ==
Ashurhat village is located in Nityanandapur Union of Shailkupa Upazila, in the Jhenaidah District of Khulna Division.

== Bird sanctuary ==
In 2013, under the direction of the district administration, the local authorities officially declared Ashurhat a bird sanctuary to protect its unique avian population.

== Tourism ==
Today, Ashurhat has become a popular tourist destination. Visitors from various parts of Bangladesh come here to see the thousands of birds and experience the natural harmony of the village.

== Local initiatives ==
Local residents have arranged voluntary guards to protect the birds from poaching and disturbances.
