= Shailkupa Government College =

Shailkupa Government Degree College
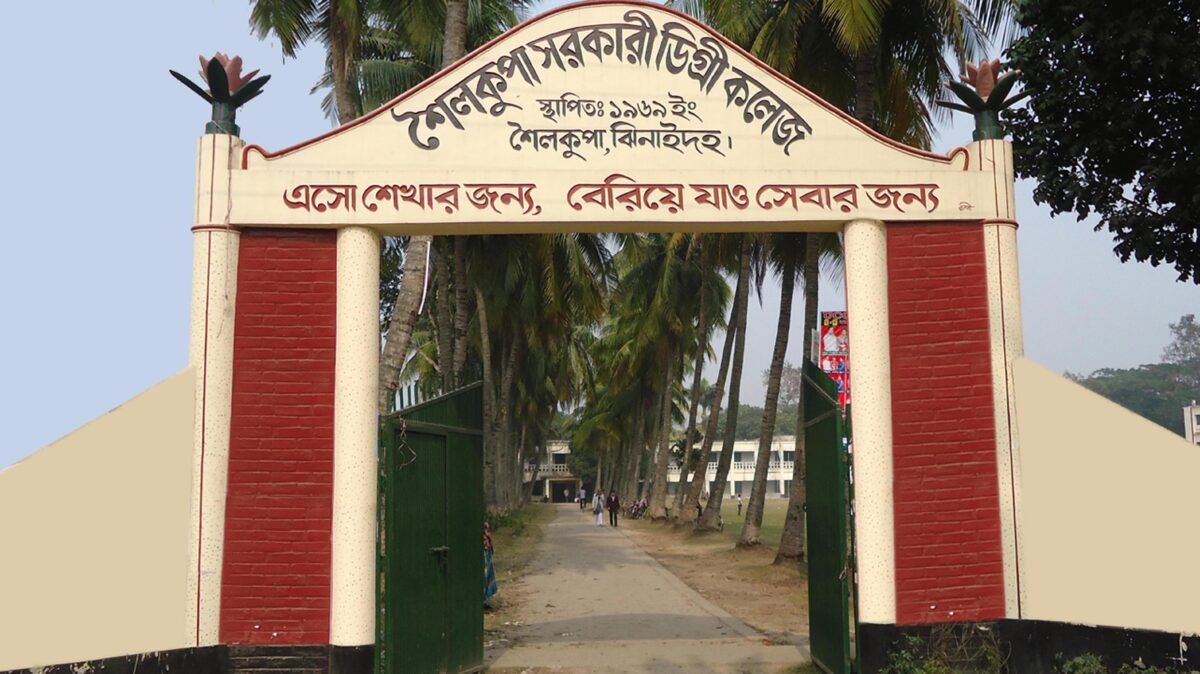
- College Gate
- Former name: Shailkupa Degree College
- Type: Government college
- Established: 1969; 57 years ago
- Affiliations: National University
- Location: Shailkupa, 7325, Bangladesh; 23.685579°N 89.249293°E
- National University Code: 0602
- Education Board: Jashore Education Board
- Website: shailkupagovtcollege.edu.bd

Shailkupa Government Degree College is a Government college in Jhenaidah District. The college was established in 1969 in Shailkupa Upazila.

== Notable alumni ==
- Shamsun Nahar Shimla - Bangladeshi film actress
- Md. Asaduzzaman - Minister of Ministry of Law, Bangladesh
