= Md Nayeb Ali Joarder =

Bangladeshi politician

- নায়েব আলী জোয়ার্দ্দার
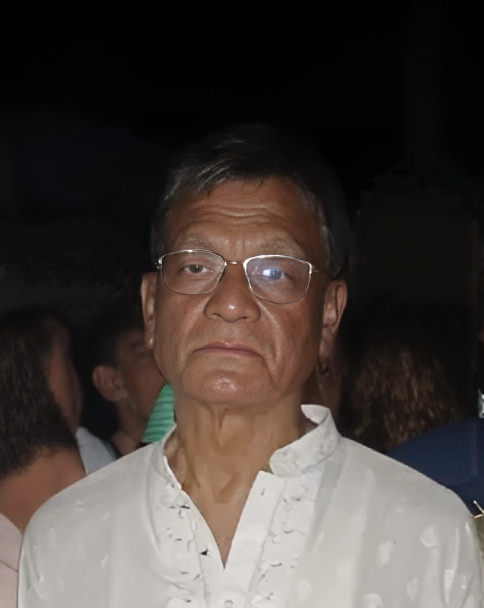
- Joarder in 2024

Member of the Bangladesh Parliament for Jhenaidah-1
- In office 26 May 2024 – 6 August 2024
- Preceded by: Abdul Hyee
- Succeeded by: Md Asaduzzaman

Personal details
- Born: January 1, 1958 (age 68) Dudshar Union

Md Nayeb Ali Joarder (Bengali: মোঃ নায়েব আলী জোয়ার্দ্দার) is a Bangladeshi Awami League politician and a former Jatiya Sangsad member representing the Jhenaidah-1 constituency for a few months in 2024. In May 2024, he was elected unopposed in the by-election after the two remaining candidates withdrew from the race.

On 12 September 2024, Joarder was arrested in Jhenaidah Sadar Upazila by a team of Rapid Action Battalion (RAB) in a case filed over attack, vandalism, and torching during the 2024 non-cooperation movement.

== Early life ==
Nayeb Ali Joaddar was born on 1st January 1958 in Dudhsar village of Jhenaidah District Shailkupa Upazila Dudshar Union His father is late Kashim Uddin Zoaddar and mother is late Noor Jahan Begum. In personal life he is a businessman.

== Political Life ==
Nayeb Ali Zoddar got involved in BSL politics from secondary level. During the 1969 mass uprising, he started his political career by joining the politics of the Chhatra League from his student life, holding the hands of his father and elder brother. Elected Member of Parliament unopposed from Jhenaidah-1 Constituency in the 12th National Assembly. and he was the former chairman of Shailkupa Upazila Dudhsar Union.

After the fall of the Awami League government in 2024 through the student-people's coup, President Mohammed Sahabuddin dissolved the National Parliament, and he lost his position as a member of Parliament.
