= Ratonpur =

Coordinates: 23°42′03″N 89°10′42″E

Ratonpur is a village of Shailkupa Upazila, Jhenaidah District, Bangladesh. It has a population of approximately 1,100.
