= Bhataibazar Government Degree College =

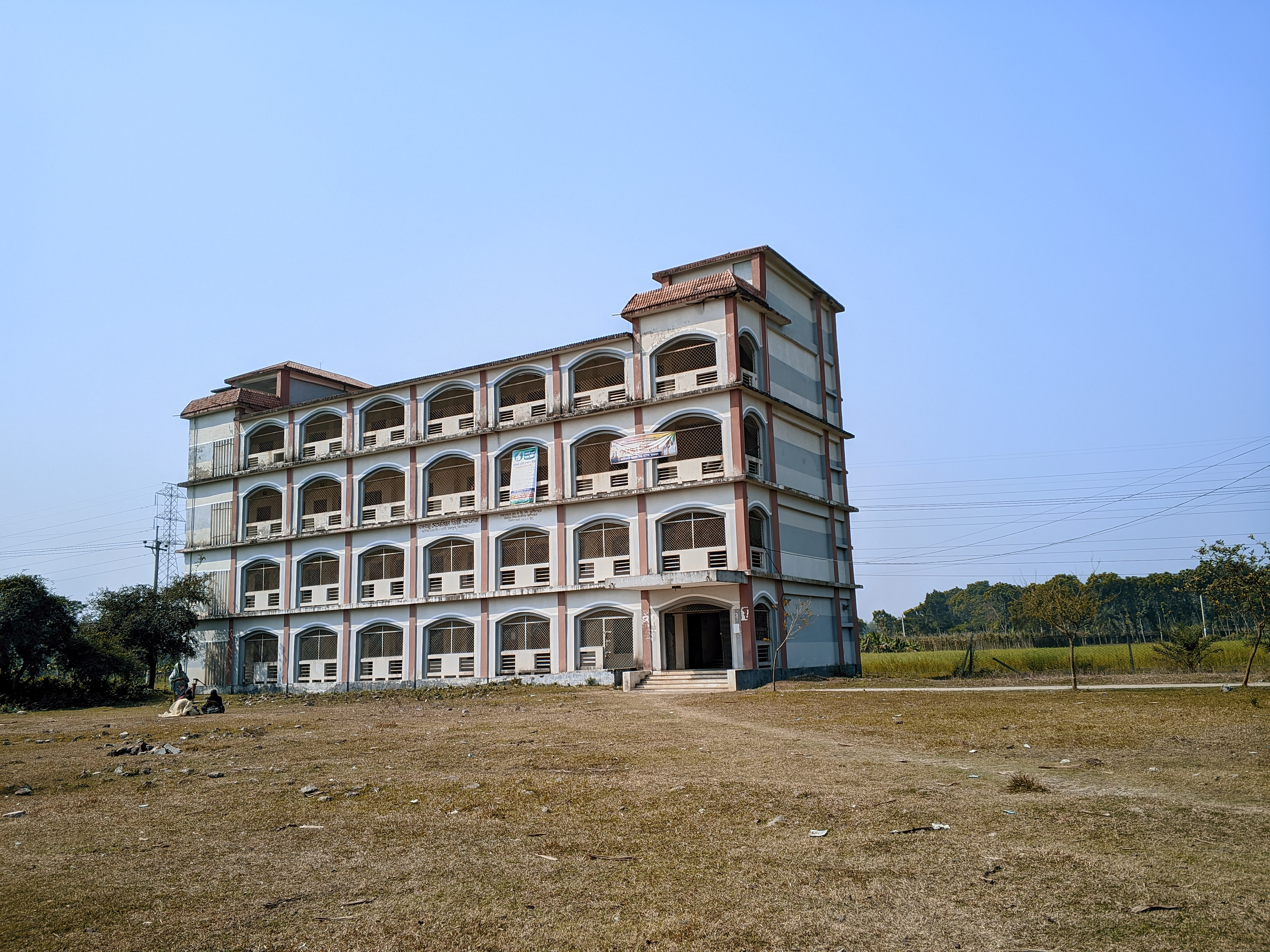
- Main building
- Other name: Government Bangabandhu Memorial Degree College
- Type: Government College
- Established: 2000; 26 years ago
- Affiliations: National University
- Principal: A.K.M. Mamunur Rahman
- Location: Bhatoi Bazar, Shailkupa, Jhenaidah, 7320, Bangladesh} 23°36′28″N 89°10′49″E
- Campus: Rural
- National University Code: 0629
- Education Board: Jashore Education Board
- Website: www.bbgdc.edu.bd

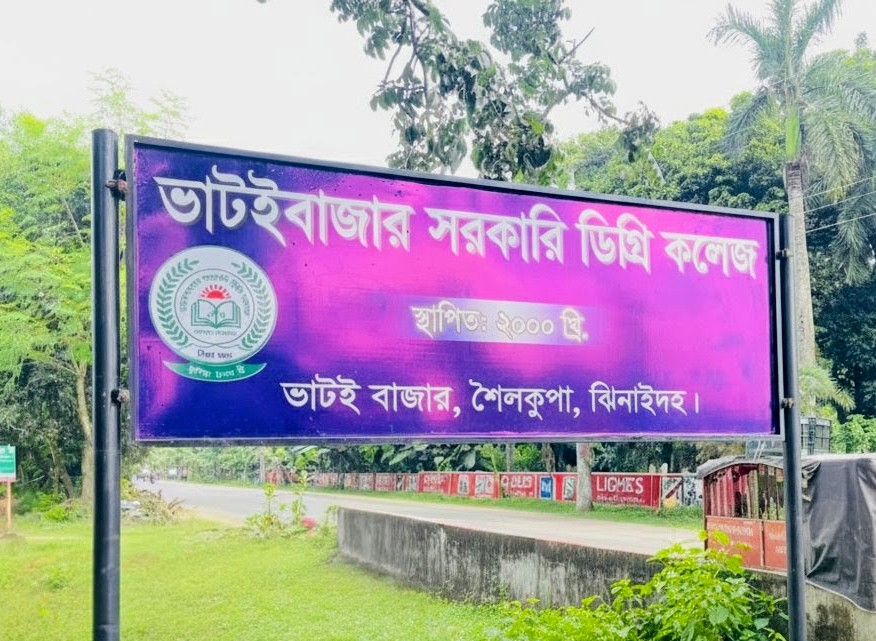
Entrance

Bhataibazar Government Degree College (formerly: Government Bangabandhu Memorial Degree College) is a government college in Jhenaidah District, Bangladesh. The college was established in 2000 in Shailkupa Upazila.

== Location ==
The college is situated on 4 acres of land on the western side of the Kushtia Highway (N704) in Bhatoi Bazar, under the Shailkupa Upazila of Jhenaidah District. The college is 8 km from the district headquarters, Jhenaidah, and 13 km from the upazila headquarters, Shailkupa.

== History ==
Bangabandhu Memorial Degree College was established in 2000 in Bhatoi Bazar of Shailkupa Upazila, Jhenaidah district, by local education enthusiasts. On January 25, 2020, the Secondary and Higher Education Division issued a memorandum to nationalize the college, instructing the Deputy Commissioner of Jhenaidah to submit a report with various information and opinions about the college. After the Deputy Commissioner prepared and sent the report to the Secondary and Higher Education Division, it was forwarded to the Prime Minister's Office on September 3, 2020. For the purpose of nationalization, the Directorate of Secondary and Higher Education issued a memorandum on March 21, 2023, imposing a ban on all expenditures of the college except for those required for daily operations. Subsequently, after the fall of the government in 2024, the name was changed to Bhatoibazar Government Degree College.

== Departments ==
At Bhatoibazar Government Degree College, there are 3 groups at the Higher Secondary level under the Jashore Board. Under the National University, there are 03 types of Degree (Pass) courses and 05 Honours subjects.

Degree	No.	Subject
Higher Secondary	01	Science
Higher Secondary	02	Humanities
Higher Secondary	03	Business Studies
Degree (Pass)	04	B.A.
Degree (Pass)	05	B.S.S.
Degree (Pass)	06	B.B.S.
Honours	07	Bengali
Honours	08	Sociology
Honours	09	Political Science
Honours	10	Accounting
Honours	11	Management
