= Md. Kamruzzaman =

Bangladeshi politician

Member of Bangladesh Parliament
- In office 1986–1988
- Preceded by: Parliament Start
- Succeeded by: Muhammad Dabiruddin Joardar

Personal details
- Born: Shailkupa, Jhenaidah District
- Party: Bangladesh Awami League

Muhammad Kamruzzaman is a Bangladesh Awami League politician and a former member of parliament for Jhenaidah-1.

== Career ==
Kamruzzaman was elected to parliament from Jhenaidah-1 as a Bangladesh Awami League candidate in 1986.
