= Abdul Hyee =

Bangladeshi politician (1952–2024)

- আব্দুল হাই
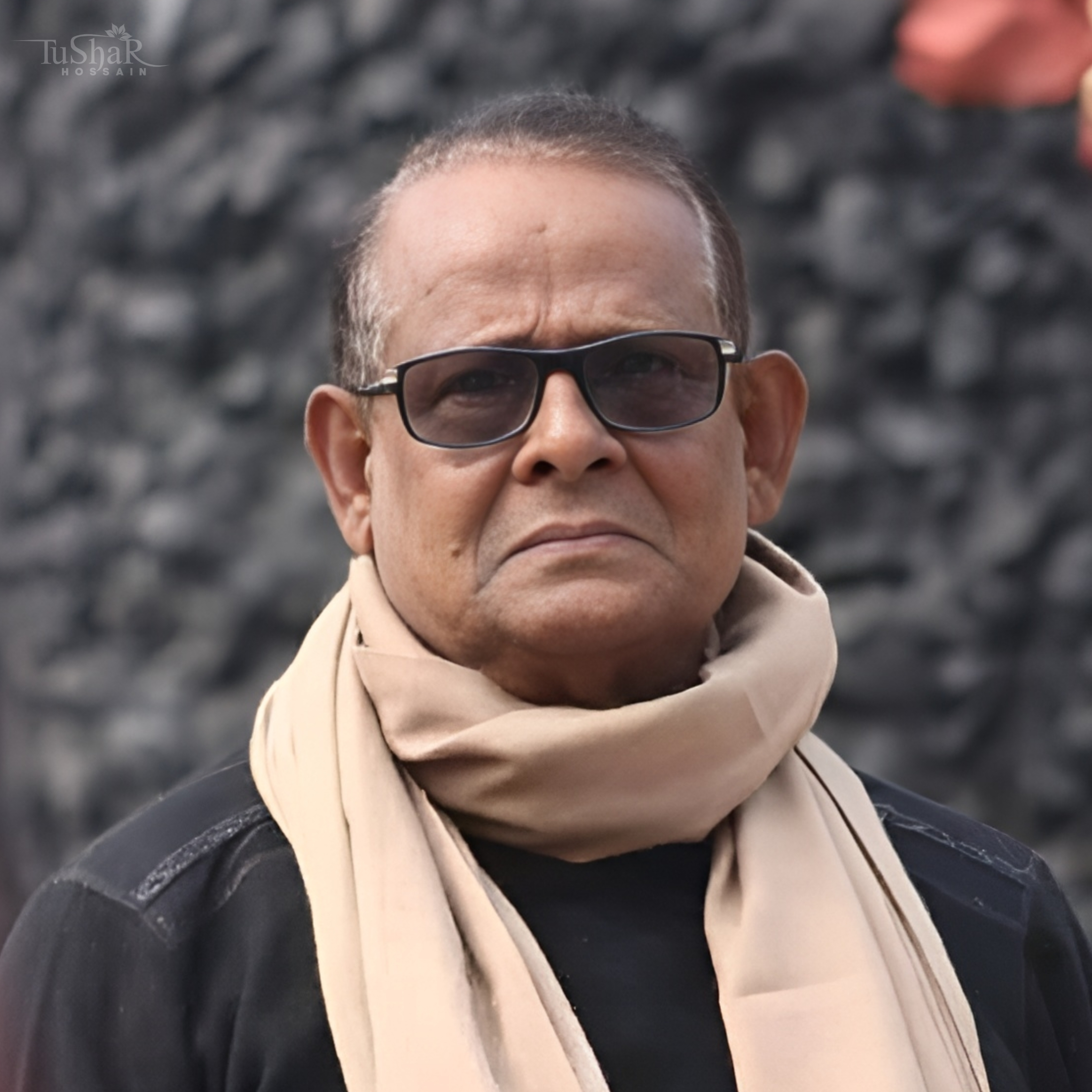
- Hyee in 2022

State Minister of Fisheries and Livestock
- In office 16 September 2012 – 24 January 2014

Member of the Bangladesh Parliament for Jhenaidah-1
- In office 28 October 2001 – 16 March 2024
- Preceded by: Abdul Wahab
- Succeeded by: Md Nayeb Ali Joarder

Personal details
- Born: 1 May 1952 Shailkupa Upazila, Jhenaidah district, East Bengal, Pakistan
- Died: 16 March 2024 (aged 71) Bangkok, Thailand
- Party: Awami League
- Education: KC College

Abdul Hyee (Bengali: আব্দুল হাই) (1 May 1952 – 16 March 2024) was a Bangladeshi Awami League politician who was a Jatiya Sangsad member, representing the Jhenaidah-1 constituency from 2001 to 2024. He served as the state minister of fisheries and livestock during 2012–2013.

== Early life and education ==
Abdul Hyee was born in Shailkupa Upazila, Jhenaidah District, on 1 May 1952. He passed the SSC exams in 1967. He attended KC College and completed a Bachelor of Arts degree.

== Career ==
Hyee joined the Bangladesh Chhatra League during his college life. In 1969, he was elected VP of KC College Chatra Sangshad (Student Union). In 1971, he joined the Liberation War of Bangladesh.

Hyee was nominated by the Bangladesh Awami League and was elected a member of parliament in 2001 from the constituency Jhenaidah-1 (Shailkupa Upazila). In 2008, he was elected member of parliament for the second term and later was appointed the state minister of the Ministry of Fisheries and Livestock. He was elected in his third term in parliament in January 2014. He was elected member of parliament in his fourth consecutive term in 2018 from Shailkupa Upazila.

=== Controversy ===
According to The Daily Star, several politicians complained that Hyee had been engaged in irregularities in sending people abroad. The police seized Hyee's passport at the Zia International Airport (now Shahjalal International Airport) when another person used the passport to travel.

== Death ==
Hyee died on 16 March 2024, at the age of 71.
