= Abdul Wahab (Jhenaidah politician) =

Bangladeshi politician

Member of Parliament for Jhenaidah-1
- In office 5 March 1991 – 13 July 2001
- Preceded by: Muhammad Dabiruddin Joardar
- Succeeded by: Abdul Hyee

Personal details
- Party: Bangladesh Nationalist Party

Abdul Wahab is a Bangladesh Nationalist Party politician. He served as the Jatiya Sangsad member representing the Jhenaidah-1 constituency.

== Career ==
Abdul Wohab was a part of Bangladesh Nationalist Party from its foundation. Abdul previously was elected Union Parishad chairman of Nityanandapur Union. During his third term, he was pushed forward to participate in the general election in 1991 as a candidate of Jhenaidah-1 of Bangladesh Nationalist Party (BNP). Later he was elected as the member of parliament. He was re-elected as MP on 15 February in 1996 with a large number of votes. The parliament was dissolved due to protest for caretaker government hosting elections. So under the caretaker government election again held in the year 1996. In the following election, he won with a great margin, his nearby opposition was Kamaruzzaman nominated by Bangladesh Awami League (BAL). Abdul Wohab lost the election in 2001 by 300 votes. In 2008 general election he lost by a good number of votes. Bangladesh Nationalist party boycotted the 2014 election. Abdul Wohab was bounded by political cases. For this reason, he was unable to participate in the general election in 2018 in spite of being nominated by BNP. After the July Revolution in 2024 he was fighting his political cases that were given by the awami regime.
