= Mirzapur Union, Shailkupa =

Mirzapur Union মির্জাপুর ইউনিয়ন
- Union
- Mirzapur Union
- Location within Bangladesh
- Coordinates: 23.6791°N 89.1560°E
- Country: Bangladesh
- Division: Khulna
- District: Jhenaidah
- Upazila: Shailkupa

Area
  - Total: 34.87 km^{2} (13.46 sq mi)

Population (2011)
  - Total: 28,425
  - Density: 815.2/km^{2} (2,111/sq mi)
- Time zone: UTC+6 (BST)
- Website: mirzapurup.jhenaidah.gov.bd

Mirzapur Union (Bengali: মির্জাপুর ইউনিয়ন) is a union parishad of Shailkupa Upazila, in Jhenaidah District, Khulna Division of Bangladesh. The union has an area of 34.87 square kilometres (13.46 sq mi) and as of 2001 had a population of 28,425. There are 27 villages and 15 mouzas in the union.
