= Sarutia Union =

Sarutia Union সারুটিয়া ইউনিয়ন
- Union
- Sarutia Union
- Location within Bangladesh
- Country: Bangladesh
- Division: Khulna
- District: Jhenaidah
- Upazila: Shailkupa

Area
  - Total: 26.91 km^{2} (10.39 sq mi)

Population (2011)
  - Total: 23,424
  - Density: 870.5/km^{2} (2,254/sq mi)
- Time zone: UTC+6 (BST)
- Website: sarutiaup.jhenaidah.gov.bd

Sarutia Union (Bengali: সারুটিয়া ইউনিয়ন) is a union parishad situated at Shailkupa Upazila, in Jhenaidah District, Khulna Division of Bangladesh. The union has an area of 26.92 square kilometres (10.39 sq mi) and as of 2001 had a population of 23,424. There are 21 villages and 11 Mouzas in the union.
