= Dignagar Union =

Dignagore Union দিগনগর ইউনিয়ন
- Union
- Dignagore Union
- Location within Bangladesh
- Coordinates: 23.6861°N 89.1946°E
- Country: Bangladesh
- Division: Khulna
- District: Jhenaidah
- Upazila: Shailkupa

Area
  - Total: 19.98 km^{2} (7.71 sq mi)

Population (2011)
  - Total: 18,169
  - Density: 909.4/km^{2} (2,355/sq mi)
- Time zone: UTC+6 (BST)
- Website: dignagoreup.jhenaidah.gov.bd

Dignagore Union (Bengali: দিগনগর ইউনিয়ন) is a union parishad situated at Shailkupa Upazila, in Jhenaidah District, Khulna Division of Bangladesh. The union has an area of 19.98 square kilometres (7.71 sq mi) and as of 2001 had a population of 18,169. There are 15 villages and 14 Mouzas in the union.
