= Bagura Union =

Bagura Union বগুড়া ইউনিয়ন
- Union
- Bagura Union
- Location within Bangladesh
- Coordinates: 23.6255°N 89.3045°E
- Country: Bangladesh
- Division: Khulna
- District: Jhenaidah
- Upazila: Shailkupa

Area
  - Total: 24.03 km^{2} (9.28 sq mi)

Population (2011)
  - Total: 18,454
  - Density: 768.0/km^{2} (1,989/sq mi)
- Time zone: UTC+6 (BST)
- Website: boguraup.jhenaidah.gov.bd

Bagura Union (Bengali: বগুড়া ইউনিয়ন) is a union parishad situated at Shailkupa Upazila, in Jhenaidah District, Khulna Division of Bangladesh. The union has an area of 24.03 square kilometres (9.28 sq mi) and as of 2001 had a population of 18,454. There are 16 villages and 8 Mouzas in the union.
