= Dhaloharachandra Union =

Dhaloharachandra Union ধলহরাচন্দ্র ইউনিয়ন
- Union
- Dhaloharachandra Union
- Location within Bangladesh
- Coordinates: 23.6598°N 89.3364°E
- Country: Bangladesh
- Division: Khulna
- District: Jhenaidah
- Upazila: Shailkupa

Area
  - Total: 28.49 km^{2} (11.00 sq mi)

Population (2011)
  - Total: 24,357
  - Density: 854.9/km^{2} (2,214/sq mi)
- Time zone: UTC+6 (BST)
- Website: dhaloharachandraup.jhenaidah.gov.bd

Dhaloharachandra Union (Bengali: ধলহরাচন্দ্র ইউনিয়ন) is a union parishad situated at Shailkupa Upazila, in Jhenaidah District, Khulna Division of Bangladesh. The union has an area of 28.49 square kilometres (11.00 sq mi) and as of 2001 had a population of 24,357. There are 27 villages and 10 Mouzas in the union.
