= Fulhari Union =

Fulhari Union ফুলহরি ইউনিয়ন
- Union
- Fulhari Union
- Location within Bangladesh
- Coordinates: 23.6513°N 89.1622°E
- Country: Bangladesh
- Division: Khulna
- District: Jhenaidah
- Upazila: Shailkupa

Area
  - Total: 21.02 km^{2} (8.12 sq mi)

Population (2011)
  - Total: 20,292
  - Density: 965.4/km^{2} (2,500/sq mi)
- Time zone: UTC+6 (BST)
- Website: fulhariup.jhenaidah.gov.bd

Fulhari Union (Bengali: ফুলহরি ইউনিয়ন) is a union parishad of Shailkupa Upazila, in Jhenaidah District, Khulna Division of Bangladesh. The union has an area of 21.02 square kilometres (8.12 sq mi) and as of 2001 had a population of 20,292. There are 15 villages and 7 Mouzas in the union.
