= Tribeni Union =

Tribeni Union ত্রিবেনী ইউনিয়ন
- Union
- Location within Bangladesh
- Coordinates: 23.7041°N 89.1572°E
- Country: Bangladesh
- Division: Khulna
- District: Jhenaidah
- Upazila: Shailkupa

Area
  - Total: 19.22 km^{2} (7.42 sq mi)

Population (2001)
  - Total: 19,557
  - Density: 1,018/km^{2} (2,635/sq mi)
- Time zone: UTC+6 (BST)
- Website: tribeniup.jhenaidah.gov.bd

Tribeni Union (Bengali: ত্রিবেনী ইউনিয়ন) is a union parishad of Shailkupa Upazila, Jhenaidah District, Khulna Division, Bangladesh. The union has an area of 19.22 square kilometres (7.42 sq mi) and as of 2001 had a population of 19,577. There are 20 villages and 8 Mouzas in the union.
