= Shailkupa Shahi Mosque =

Mosque in Shailkupa Upazilla, Jhenaidah, Bangladesh

- শৈলকুপা শাহী মসজিদ
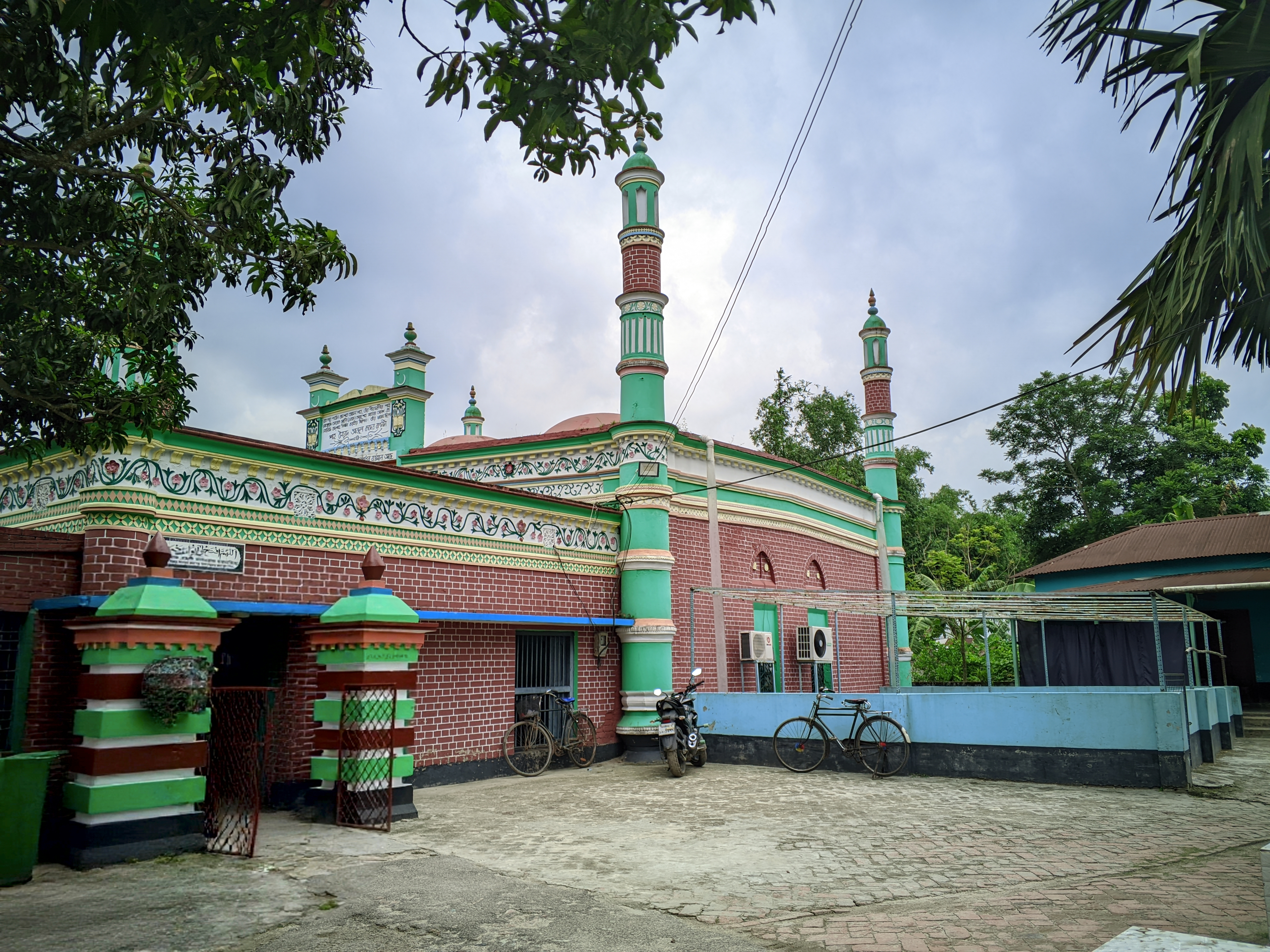

Religion
- Affiliation: Islam

Location
- Location: Shailkupa, Jhenaidah
- Country: Bangladesh
- Interactive map of Shailkupa Shahi Mosque
- Coordinates: 23.6864343°N 89.2413523°E

Architecture
- Style: Sultanate-era
- Established: 1532
- Dome: 7

Shailkupa Shahi Mosque is a historic Sultanate-era mosque situated along the banks of the Kumar River in Shailkupa Upazila of Jhenaidah District, Bangladesh. Built during the reign of Sultan Nasiruddin Nasrat Shah, it stands as a prominent architectural landmark in southern Bengal.

== History ==
Historical records suggest that Nasiruddin Nasrat Shah (popularly known as Nasir Shah), son of Sultan Alauddin Husain Shah, commissioned the construction of the mosque between 1523 and 1524, prior to the establishment of Mughal rule in the region.

The main entrance and the corner towers (minarets) seen today were added during subsequent renovations over the centuries. The compound also houses the shrine (mazar) of the revered local Sufi saint, Darvesh Arab Shah.

== Gallery ==
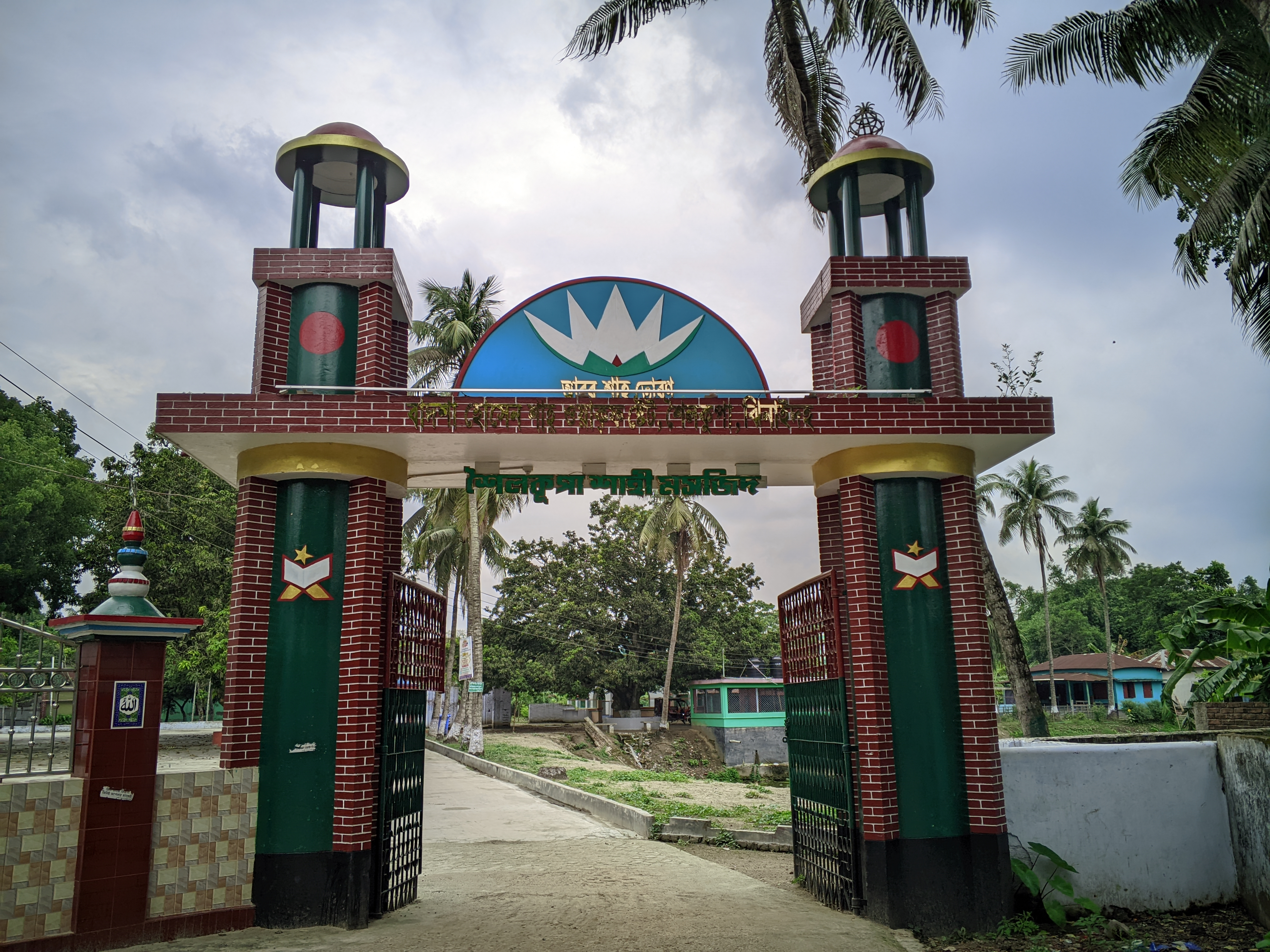
Entrance gate of the Shahi Mosque

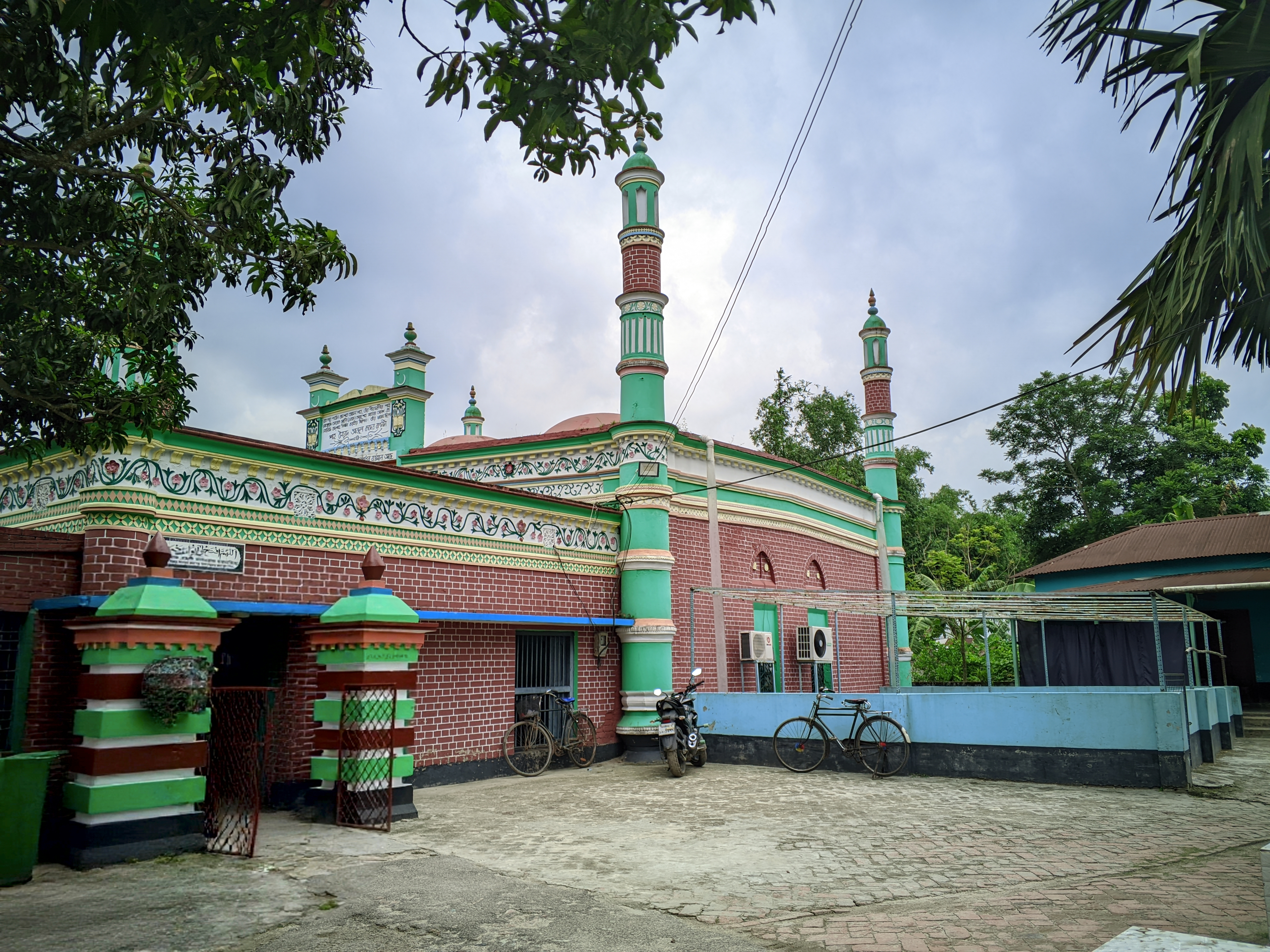
Exterior view of the mosque

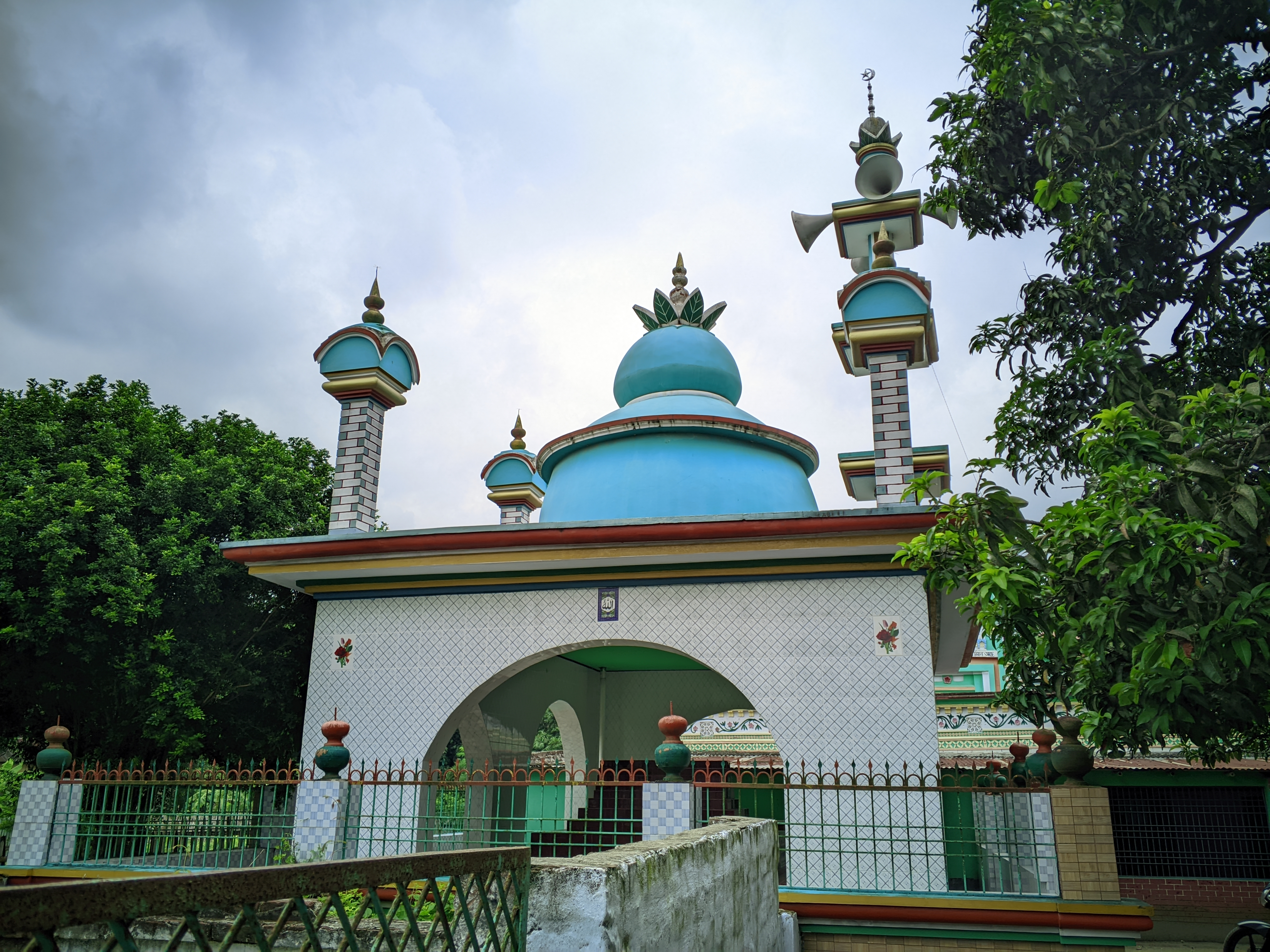
The adjacent shrine (mazar)

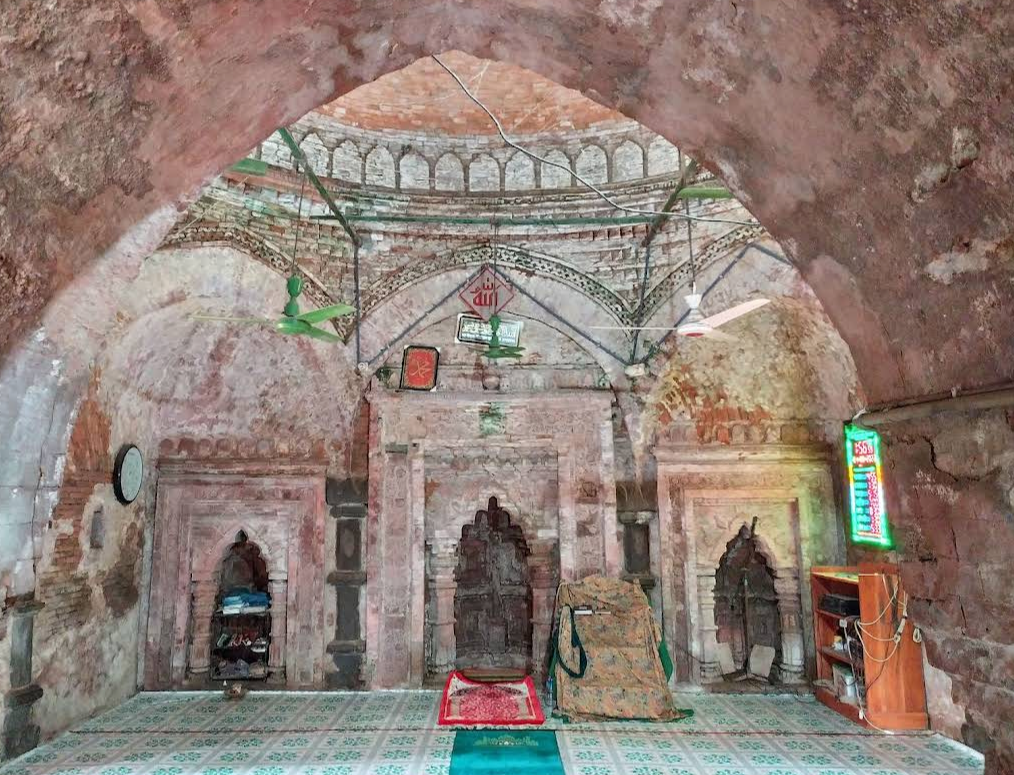
Interior view of the mosque
