= Jhenaidah-1 =

Constituency of Bangladesh's Jatiya Sangsad

Coordinates: 23.685°N 89.250°E

- Constituency for the Jatiya Sangsad
- District: Jhenaidah District
- Division: Khulna Division
- Electorate: 325,278 (2026)

Current constituency
- Created: 1984
- Party: Bangladesh Nationalist Party
- Member: Md Asaduzzaman
- ← 80 Chuadanga-2 82 Jhenaidah-2 →

Jhenaidah-1 is a constituency represented in the Jatiya Sangsad (National Parliament) of Bangladesh since 2026 by Md Asaduzzaman of the Bangladesh Nationalist Party.

== Boundaries ==
The constituency encompasses Shailkupa Upazila.

== History ==
The constituency was created in 1984 from a Jessore constituency when the former Jessore District was split into four districts: Jhenaidah, Jessore, Magura, and Narail.

== Members of Parliament ==
Election	Member	Party
1986	Md. Kamruzzaman	Awami League
1988	Muhammad Dabiruddin Joardar	Jatiya Samajtantrik Dal
1991	Abdul Wahab	Bangladesh Nationalist Party
Feb 1996	Abdul Wahab	Bangladesh Nationalist Party
Jun 1996	Abdul Wahab	Bangladesh Nationalist Party
2001	Abdul Hyee	Awami League
2024	Md. Nayeb Ali Zoarder	Awami League
2026	Md Asaduzzaman	Bangladesh Nationalist Party

== Elections ==
=== Elections in the 2020s ===
General Election 2026: Jhenaidah-1
Party	Candidate	Votes	%	±%
BNP	Md Asaduzzaman	173,381	74.6	N/A
Jamaat	Abu Saleh Md. Matiur Rahman	57,055	24.6	N/A
JP(E)	Monika Alam	969	0.4	N/A
AB Party	Md. Matiar Rahman	610	0.3	N/A
BSD (Marxist)	Shahidul Enam Pallab Mia	309	0.1	N/A
Majority		116,326	50.1	N/A
Turnout		232,324	71.4	N/A
Registered electors		325,278		
BNP gain from AL				

=== Elections in the 2010s ===
General Election 2014: Jhenaidah-1
Party	Candidate	Votes	%	±%
AL	Abdul Hyee	111,153	84.7	+31.6
Independent	Md. Nayeb Ali Zoarder	18,628	14.2	N/A
Jatiya Party (M)	Golam Mostofa	1,449	1.1	N/A
Majority		92,525	70.5	+59.2
Turnout		131,230	52.8	−39.5
AL hold				

=== Elections in the 2000s ===
General Election 2008: Jhenaidah-1
Party	Candidate	Votes	%	±%
AL	Abdul Hyee	109,050	53.1	+3.3
BNP	Abdul Wahab	85,899	41.9	−7.7
Independent	Saidur Rahman	9,243	4.5	N/A
IAB	Quazi Rejaul Karim	948	0.5	N/A
BDB	Golam Mostafa	102	0.0	N/A
Majority		23,151	11.3	+11.1
Turnout		205,242	92.3	+6.8
AL hold				

General Election 2001: Jhenaidah-1
Party	Candidate	Votes	%	±%
AL	Abdul Hyee	92,652	49.8	+5.1
BNP	Abdul Wahab	92,306	49.6	+0.6
IJOF	Md. Atiar Rahman Khan	973	0.5	N/A
CPB	Alamgir Hossain	214	0.1	0.0
Majority		346	0.2	−4.1
Turnout		186,145	85.5	−2.1
AL gain from BNP				

=== Elections in the 1990s ===
General Election June 1996: Jhenaidah-1
Party	Candidate	Votes	%	±%
BNP	Abdul Wahab	75,105	49.0	−0.1
AL	Md. Kamruzzaman	68,514	44.7	+9.2
Jamaat	Abu Tayab	5,945	3.9	+3.7
JP(E)	Golam Mostofa	2,301	1.5	+1.3
IOJ	Md. Abdul Wahab	581	0.4	N/A
Gano Forum	Md. Zahidunnabi	393	0.3	N/A
Zaker Party	Md. Akram-Ud-Daula	294	0.2	−1.3
CPB	Md. Rajibul Hasan	104	0.1	0.0
Independent	Z. M. Akhtaruzzman	103	0.1	N/A
Majority		6,591	4.3	−9.3
Turnout		153,340	87.6	+15.8
BNP hold				

General Election 1991: Jhenaidah-1
Party	Candidate	Votes	%	±%
BNP	Abdul Wahab	63,663	49.1	
AL	Md. Kamruzzaman	46,029	35.5	
Jamaat	Shiraj Ali	11,926	9.2	
Jatiya Samajtantrik Dal-JSD	Md. Golam Mustafa	4,445	3.4	
Zaker Party	Md. Sobed Ali	1,964	1.5	
FP	Miah Abdur Rashid	1,045	0.8	
JP(E)	Z. M. Akhtaruzzman	200	0.2	
CPB	Zahidunnabi	161	0.1	
Independent	Muhammad Dabiruddin Joardar	110	0.1	
Bangladesh Muslim League (Yusuf)	Md. Mokbul Hossain Seikh	73	0.1	
Independent	Tanzilur Rahman	35	0.0	
Majority		17,634	13.6	
Turnout		129,651	71.8	
BNP gain from				
