= Benipur Multilateral High School =

Coordinates: 23.7313°N 89.2051°E

Information
- School type: Secondary school
- Established: 1906; 119 years ago

Benipur Multilateral High School is a secondary school in Shailkupa Upazila, Jhenaidah District. It was established in 1906.

This school has 2 academic (2 story) buildings, 1 student hostel, 1 mosque, and a library.
