= Abaipur Union =

Abaipur Union আবাইপুর ইউনিয়ন
- Union
- Abaipur Union
- Location within Bangladesh
- Coordinates: 23°36′27″N 89°19′54″E
- Country: Bangladesh
- Division: Khulna
- District: Jhenaidah
- Upazila: Shailkupa

Area
  - Total: 22.04 km^{2} (8.51 sq mi)

Population (2011)
  - Total: 18,346
  - Density: 832.4/km^{2} (2,156/sq mi)
- Time zone: UTC+6 (BST)
- Website: abaipurup.jhenaidah.gov.bd

Abaipur Union (Bengali: আবাইপুর ইউনিয়ন) is a union parishad situated at Shailkupa Upazila, in Jhenaidah District, Khulna Division of Bangladesh. The union has an area of 22.04 square kilometres (8.51 sq mi) and as of 2001 had a population of 18,346. There are 14 villages and 12 Mouzas in the union. They want to develop their country by educating people.
