= Umedpur Union =

Umedpur Union উমেদপুর ইউনিয়ন
- Union
- Umedpur Union
- Location within Bangladesh
- Coordinates: 23.3321°N 90.2026°E
- Country: Bangladesh
- Division: Khulna
- District: Jhenaidah
- Upazila: Shailkupa

Area
  - Total: 32.38 km^{2} (12.50 sq mi)

Population (2011)
  - Total: 26,243
  - Density: 810.5/km^{2} (2,099/sq mi)
- Time zone: UTC+6 (BST)
- Website: umedpurup.jhenaidah.gov.bd

Umedpur Union (Bengali: উমেদপুর ইউনিয়ন) is a union parishad of Shailkupa Upazila, in Jhenaidah District, Khulna Division of Bangladesh. The union has an area of 32.38 square kilometres (12.50 sq mi) and as of 2001 had a population of 26,243. There are 23 villages and 8 Mouzas in the union.
