= West Bengal State Co-Operative Bank =

Indian co-operative bank

The West Bengal State Co-operative Bank Ltd.
- Formerly: Bengal Provincial Cooperative Federation Ltd. (1918-1923) The Bengal Provincial Cooperative Bank Ltd. (1923-1947) The West Bengal Provincial Cooperative Bank Ltd. (1947-1964)
- Type: Cooperative bank
- Industry: Financial services
- Founded: 1918
- Headquarters: 24A, Waterloo Street, Kolkata, West Bengal, India
- Area served: West Bengal
- Key people: Special Officer, Aveek Bhattacharya (Managing Director)
- Products: Banking
- Owner: Department of Cooperation, Government of West Bengal
- Website: www.wbstcb.bank.in

The West Bengal State Co-operative Bank (WBSTCB) is an Indian provincial co-operative bank based in Kolkata. Its primary area of operation is to provide agricultural loans, controlling the District Cooperative Banks and other cooperative societies. It also includes a range of services to the sector, including locker facilities, bank guarantee, bills, letter of credit, insurance, ancillary services, deposit schemes and loan schemes. It acts as an intermediary for the implementation and funding of different schemes for the government in the fields of Agriculture, fisheries, rural development etc. Along with all the other 33 State Co-operatives it forms the National Federation of State Co-operative Banks Ltd. (NAFSCOB).

== History ==
WSTCB was established in 1918 as the Bengal Provincial Co-op. Federation Ltd. The current name was adopted in 1967. The bank suffered a set-back in 2000, when it applied to get a NABARD licence. The bank had planned to expand in 2008. These plans met with set backs, with the Government holding back plans that allowed the bank to expand. The bank also suffered financially when the farm loan waiver scheme, a government policy, affected the earning of the bank substantially for 2008.

In 2012, the bank endured a bank scam, losing Rs 60 crore, prompting the Government to establish a strategy to deal with financial scams. The bank went through en expansion of its ATM network in 2014.

== Operations ==
The WBCCB is registered as an Apex Co-operative Society along with its counterpart The West Bengal State Agricultural and Rural Development Bank Ltd. for the state of West Bengal. Its primary area of operation is to provide short term agricultural loans, control of District Central Cooperative Banks, financing of PACS. It also includes a range of services to the sector, including locker facilities, bank guarantee, bills, letter of credit, insurance, ancillary services, deposit schemes and loan schemes. The Bank is financed by NABARD and the Department of Cooperation, West Bengal. The Bank is based in Kolkata, West Bengal.

== Elections ==
As per the West Bengal Cooperative Societies Act, 2006 the Government may initiate election for the appointment of directors. Elections are done by the Cooperative Election Commission for every five years.

== Bibliography ==
- Sougata Chakrabarti; Debdas Rakshit (June 2012). Performance Analysis of Indian Cooperative Bank: An Empirical Approach. LAP Lambert Academic Publishing. ISBN 978-3-659-14986-3.
