= Manoharpur Union, Shailkupa =

Manoharpur Union মনোহরপুর ইউনিয়ন
- Union
- Manoharpur Union
- Location within Bangladesh
- Coordinates: 23.6796°N 89.2549°E
- Country: Bangladesh
- Division: Khulna
- District: Jhenaidah
- Upazila: Shailkupa

Area
  - Total: 20.13 km^{2} (7.77 sq mi)

Population (2011)
  - Total: 14,972
  - Density: 743.8/km^{2} (1,926/sq mi)
- Time zone: UTC+6 (BST)
- Website: manoharpurup.jhenaidah.gov.bd

Manoharpur Union (Bengali: মনোহরপুর ইউনিয়ন) is a union parishad situated at Shailkupa Upazila, in Jhenaidah District, Khulna Division of Bangladesh. The union has an area of 20.13 square kilometres (7.77 sq mi) and as of 2001 had a population of 14,972. There are 14 villages and 12 Mouzas in the union.
