= Kancherkol Union =

Kancherkol Union কাঁচেরকোল ইউনিয়ন
- Union
- Kancherkol Union
- Location within Bangladesh
- Coordinates: 23.7338°N 89.2056°E
- Country: Bangladesh
- Division: Khulna
- District: Jhenaidah
- Upazila: Shailkupa

Area
  - Total: 21.43 km^{2} (8.27 sq mi)

Population (2011)
  - Total: 21,271
  - Density: 992.6/km^{2} (2,571/sq mi)
- Time zone: UTC+6 (BST)
- Website: kancherkolup.jhenaidah.gov.bd

Kancherkol Union (Bengali: কাঁচেরকোল ইউনিয়ন) is a union parishad situated at Shailkupa Upazila, in Jhenaidah District, Khulna Division of Bangladesh. The union has an area of 21.43 square kilometres (8.27 sq mi) and as of 2001 had a population of 21,271 people. There are 14 villages and 5 mouzas in the union.
