= Adil Uddin College =

College in Khulna Division, Bangladesh

Adil Uddin Degree College
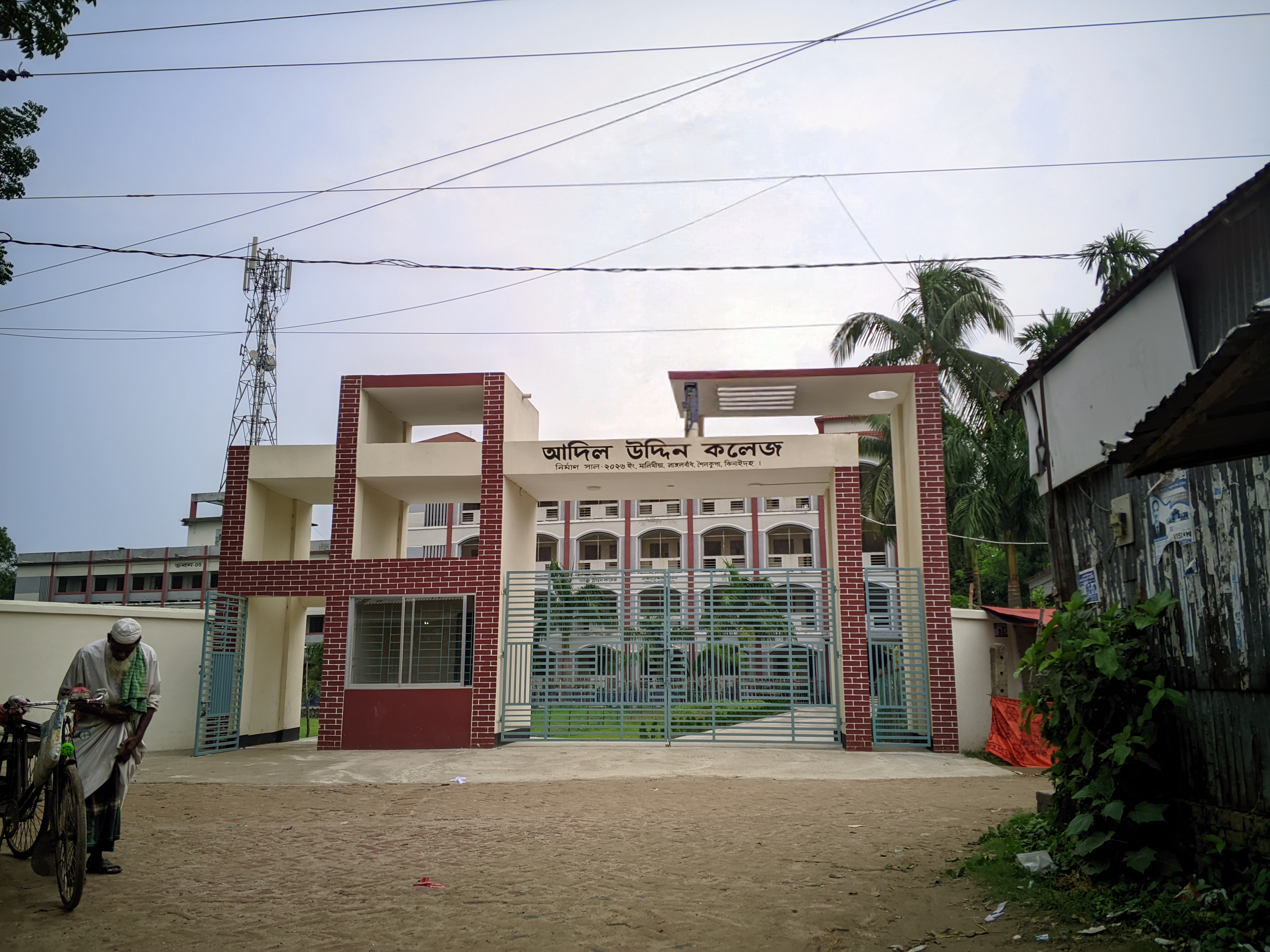
- Entrance to the college
- Other name: Adil Uddin College
- Type: MPO affiliated college
- Established: 1992
- Founders: Adil Uddin and local educationists
- Affiliations: National University
- Principal: Professor Uttam Kumar Kundu (in charge)
- Academic staff: About 110 teachers
- Location: Malithia, Langolbandh, Shailkupa, Jhenaidah, 7320, Bangladesh
- Campus: Rural
- National University Code: 0628
- Education Board: Jessore Education Board
- Website: Website

Adil Uddin Degree College is an MPO-affiliated college in Jhenaidah District of Bangladesh. The college was established in Shailkupa Upazila in 1992.

== Subjects ==
Adil Uddin College has three departments under the Jessore Board at the higher secondary level. There are three degree types (pass) courses under National University.

| Degree | No | Subject |
|---|---|---|
| Higher Secondary | 01 | Science |
| Higher Secondary | 02 | Humanities |
| Higher Secondary | 03 | Business Education |
| Degree (Pass) | 04 | B.A |
| Degree (Pass) | 05 | B.S.S |
| Degree (Pass) | 06 | B.B.S |

== Gallery ==
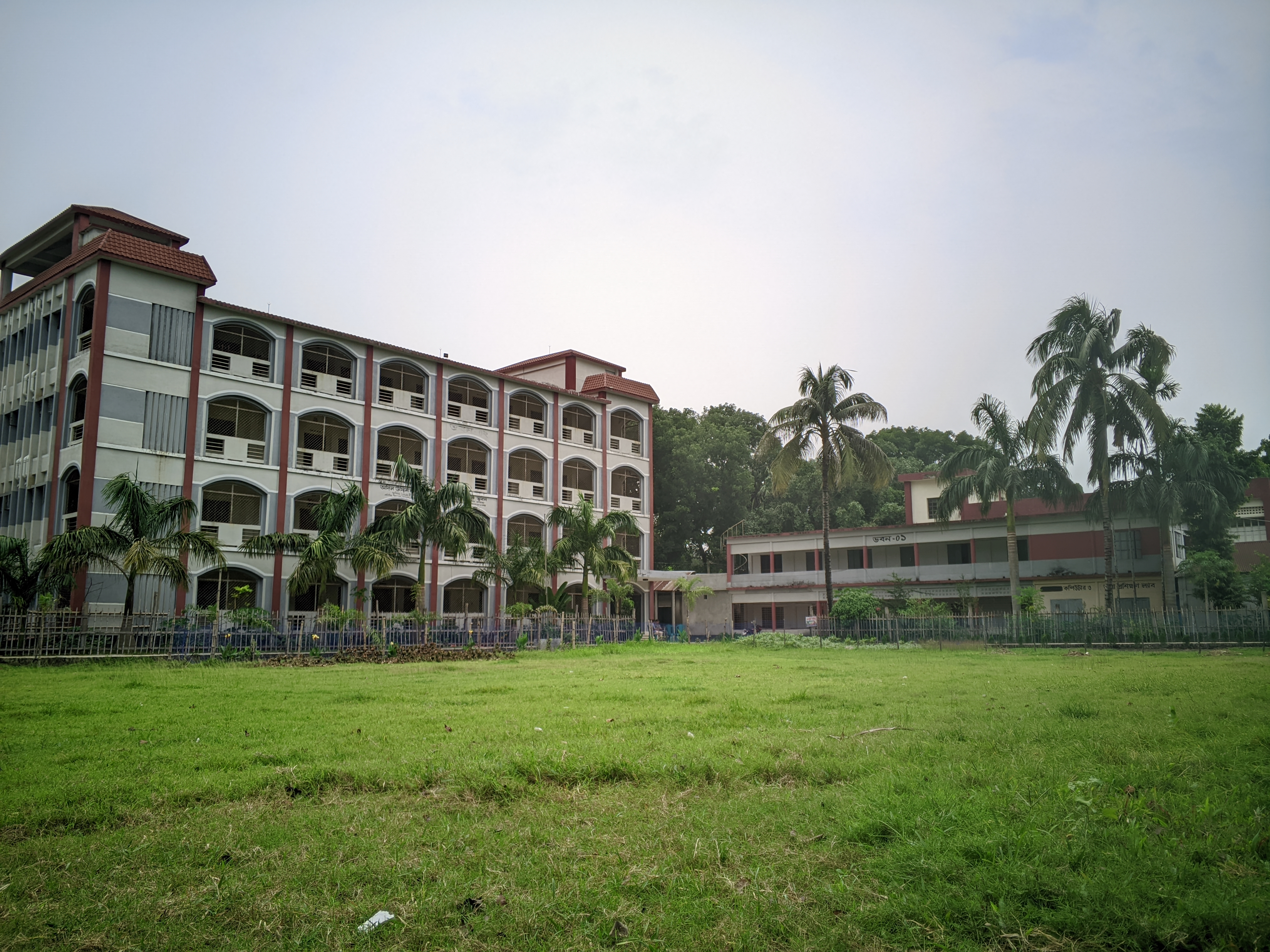
New academic building

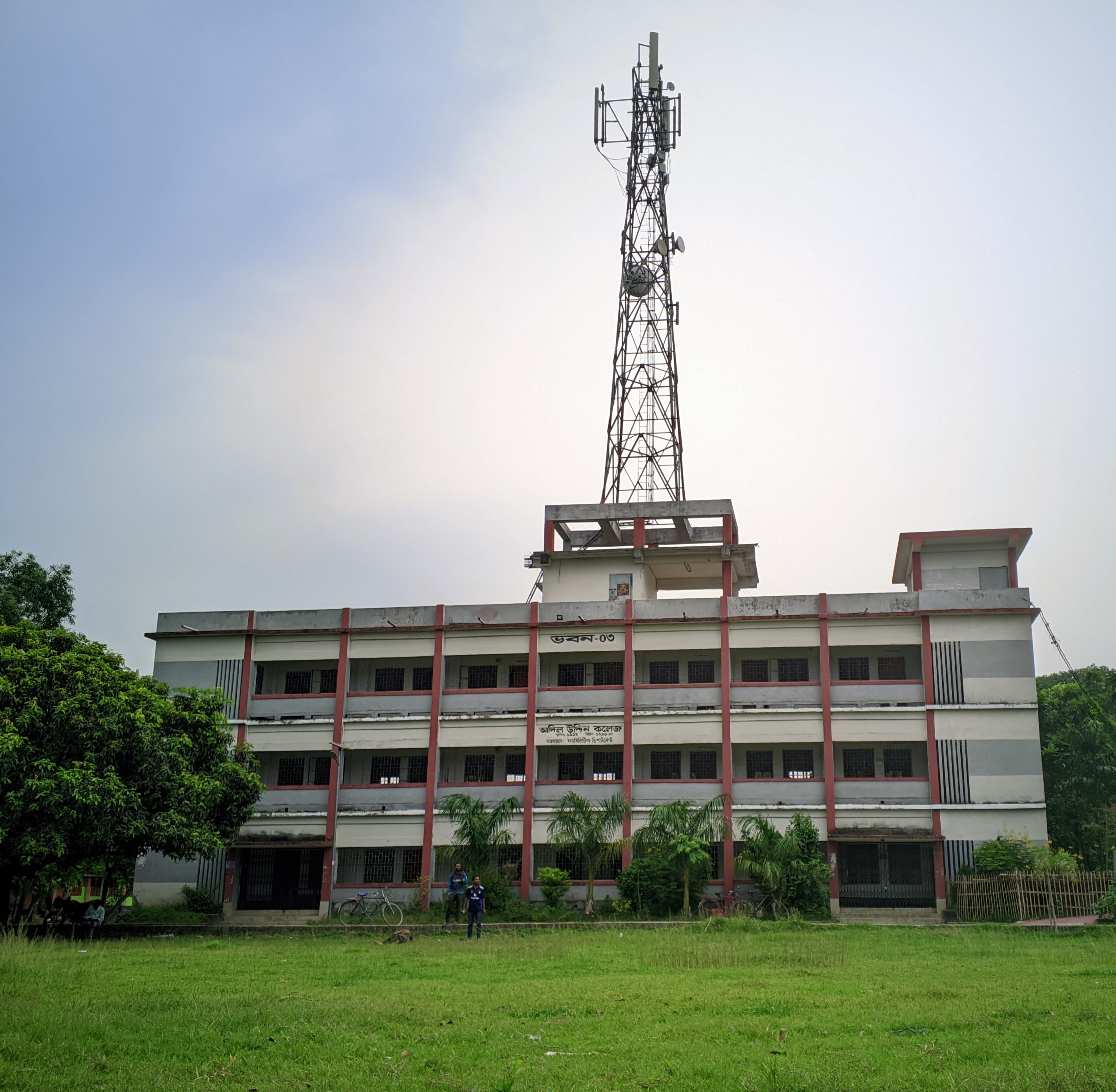
Old academic building
