= Hakimpur Union, Shailkupa =

Hakimpur Union হাকিমপুর ইউনিয়ন
- Union
- Hakimpur Union
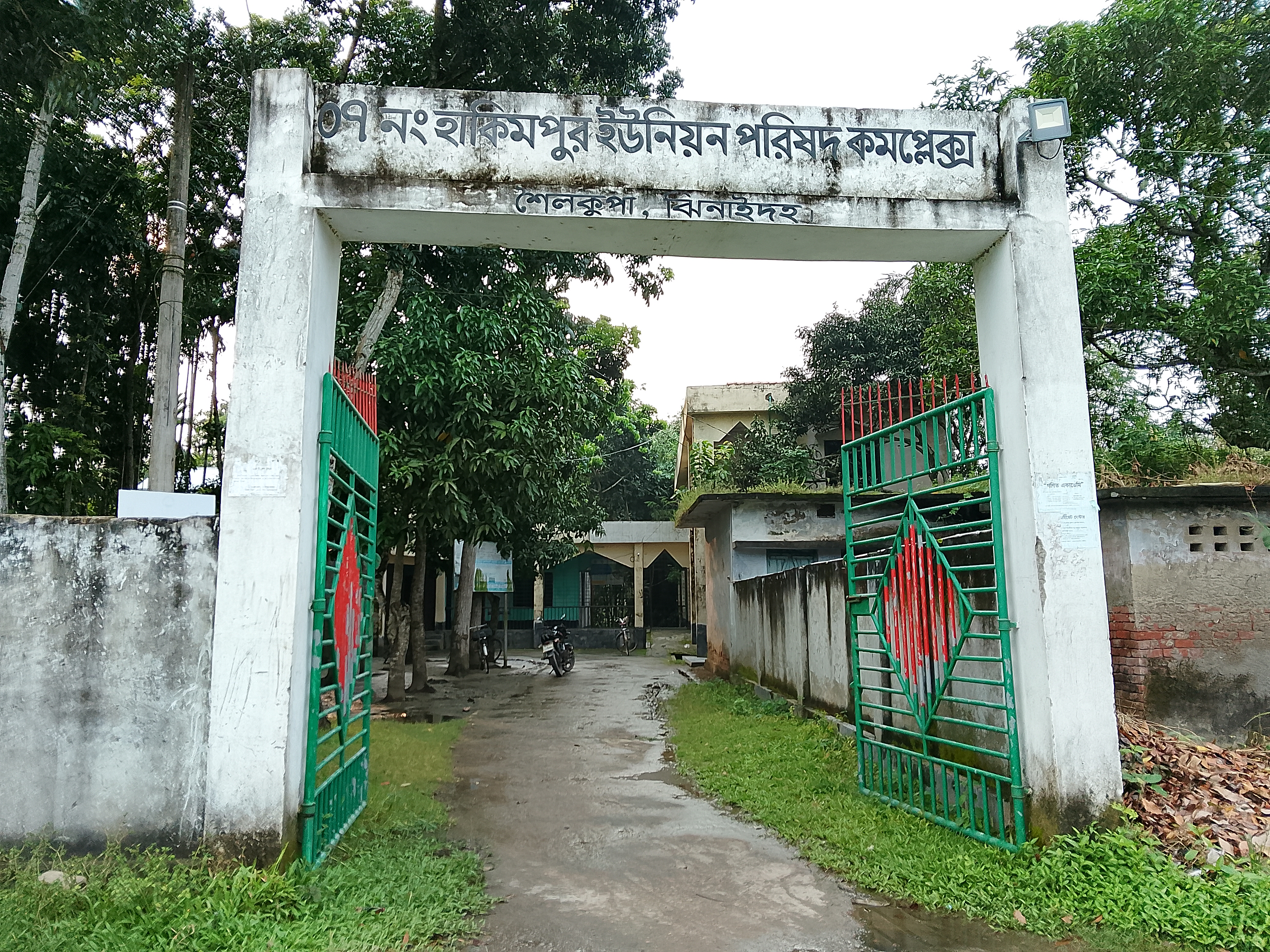
- Entrance to Hakimpur Union Parishad

- Location within Bangladesh
- Coordinates: 23.6875°N 89.2956°E
- Country: Bangladesh
- Division: Khulna
- District: Jhenaidah
- Upazila: Shailkupa

Area
  - Total: 22.95 km^{2} (8.86 sq mi)

Population (2011)
  - Total: 20,986
  - Density: 914.4/km^{2} (2,368/sq mi)
- Time zone: UTC+6 (BST)
- Website: hakimpurup.jhenaidah.gov.bd

Hakimpur Union (Bengali: হাকিমপুর ইউনিয়ন) is a union parishad of Shailkupa Upazila, in Jhenaidah District, Khulna Division of Bangladesh. The union has an area of 22.95 square kilometres (8.86 sq mi) and as of 2001 had a population of 20,986. There are 19 villages and 16 Mouzas in the union.
