= Muhammad Dabiruddin Joardar =

Bangladeshi politician

- দবিরুদ্দিন জোয়ারদার

Member of the Bangladesh Parliament for Jhenaidah-1
- In office 1988–1990
- Preceded by: Md. Kamruzzaman
- Succeeded by: Abdul Wahab

Personal details
- Born: Jhenaidah District
- Party: Jatiya Samajtantrik Dal

Muhammad Dabiruddin Joardar is a politician of Jhenaidah District of Bangladesh and former member of parliament for the Jhenaidah-1 constituency in 1988.

== Career ==
Joardar was elected to parliament from Jhenaidah-1 constituency in as an independent candidate in 1988 Bangladeshi general election. He was defeated from Jhenaidah-1 constituency as an independent candidate in the fifth parliamentary elections of 1991.
