= Jhenaidah Government High School =

School in Jhenaidah district, Bangladesh

Coordinates: 23.5379°N 89.1709°E

Jhenaidah Government High School is one of the oldest schools in the district Jhenaidah, Bangladesh. Jhenaidah Govt. High School was founded in 1877. It is the oldest and one of the most famous educational institutions in Jhenaidah. The first school functioned as a high school English on the campus of Government Girls High School. Soon, the school has been recognized as an English High School and was registered under the University of Calcutta, after which he became known as Jhenaidah Model High School. In 1961, when a new building was built for the school in a new place to house students. Then the school was moved to its present campus on land donated by wealthy people, especially Fazar Ali Dafadar and Mobarak Mondal.

In the period 1947–63 Jhenaidah Model High School was under Dhaka Board. The school was placed under Rajshahi Board in 1963 and since 1964, is under Jessore Board.
