= Md. Asaduzzaman =

Bangladeshi politician

- মোঃ আসাদুজ্জামান
- Assaduzzaman in 2025

Minister of Law, Justice and Parliamentary Affairs
- Incumbent
- Assumed office 17 February 2026
- Prime Minister: Tarique Rahman
- Preceded by: Asif Nazrul

Member of Parliament
- Incumbent
- Assumed office 17 February 2026
- Preceded by: Md Nayeb Ali Joarder
- Constituency: Jhenaidah-1

17th Attorney General for Bangladesh
- In office 8 August 2024 – 28 December 2025
- President: Mohammed Shahabuddin
- Prime Minister: Muhammad Yunus (Chief adviser)
- Preceded by: AM Amin Uddin
- Succeeded by: Ruhul Quddus Kazal

Personal details
- Born: 31 January 1971 (age 55) Baraipara, East Pakistan, Pakistan
- Party: Bangladesh Nationalist Party
- Children: 2
- Education: LLM from the University of Dhaka
- Profession: Lawyer

Md. Asaduzzaman (born 31 January 1971) is a Bangladeshi lawyer and politician. He is the incumbent minister of law, justice and parliamentary affairs and the incumbent Jatiya Sangsad member representing the Jhenaidah-1 constituency since February 2026. Earlier, he had served as the 17th Attorney General for Bangladesh during 2024–2025. He served as a senior advocate of the Supreme Court of Bangladesh.

== Early life and education ==
Asaduzzaman was born on 31 January 1971 in the village of Baraipara in Jessore District, East Pakistan, Pakistan (present-day Jhenaidah District, Bangladesh). He was a son of Sheikh Mohammad Israil Hossain Master (d. 2013) and Begum Roqeya. He passed his Secondary School Certificate from the Jessore Board in 1987, and his Higher Secondary Certificate in 1989. He then studied law at the University of Dhaka, graduating with a Bachelor of Laws followed by a Master of Laws degree. During his time in Dhaka, he became affiliated with the Jatiya Samajtantrik Dal Students' League (JSD-CL). He served as the organisational secretary for the Dhaka University Committee in 1993. In the following year, he was the publicity secretary for the JSD-CL Central Committee.

== Career ==
Asaduzzaman previously worked as a junior associate to the prominent lawyer Syed Ishtiaq Ahmed and was also the Human Rights Affairs Secretary of the BNP Central Executive Committee and an advisor to the party's Chairperson Khaleda Zia.

Former Attorney General AM Amin Uddin resigned citing personal difficulties, and subsequently, Asaduzzaman was appointed to the position.

Asaduzzaman's career includes participation in various significant cases in higher courts and solving complex legal issues.

This appointment is expected to bring new directions in the country's legal framework and aid in providing legal support to various government activities.
