= Nityanandapur Union =

Nityanandapur Union নিত্যানন্দপুর ইউনিয়ন
- Union
- Nityanandapur Union
- Location within Bangladesh
- Coordinates: 23.6159°N 89.2673°E
- Country: Bangladesh
- Division: Khulna
- District: Jhenaidah
- Upazila: Shailkupa

Area
  - Total: 32.7 km^{2} (12.6 sq mi)

Population (2011)
  - Total: 21,287
  - Density: 651/km^{2} (1,690/sq mi)
- Time zone: UTC+6 (BST)
- Website: nityanandapurup.jhenaidah.gov.bd

Nityanandapur Union (Bengali: নিত্যানন্দপুর ইউনিয়ন) is a union parishad situated at Shailkupa Upazila, in Jhenaidah District, Khulna Division of Bangladesh. The union has an area of 32.7 square kilometres (12.6 sq mi) and as of 2001 had a population of 21,287. There are 25 villages and 19 Mouzas in the union.
