= Dudshar Union =

Dudshar Union দুধসর ইউনিয়ন
- Union
- Dudshar Union
- Location within Bangladesh
- Coordinates: 23.6133°N 89.1827°E
- Country: Bangladesh
- Division: Khulna
- District: Jhenaidah
- Upazila: Shailkupa

Area
  - Total: 28.61 km^{2} (11.05 sq mi)

Population (2011)
  - Total: 23,988
  - Density: 838.4/km^{2} (2,172/sq mi)
- Time zone: UTC+6 (BST)
- Website: dudsharup.jhenaidah.gov.bd

Dudshar Union (Bengali: দুধসর ইউনিয়ন) is a union parishad of Shailkupa Upazila, in Jhenaidah District, Khulna Division of Bangladesh. The union has an area of 28.61 square kilometres (11.05 sq mi) and as of 2001 had a population of 23,988. There are 17 villages and 12 Mouzas in the union.
