= Government Keshab Chandra College =

Govt. K.C. College Jhenaidah.

Location
- Jhenaidah town Jhenaidah, 7300; Bangladesh; 23.545538°N 89.170153°E

Information
- Motto: Education for Humanization
- Established: 1960
- School board: Jessore Education Board
- Authority: Board of Governors, Govt. K.C. College Jhenaidah.
- Principal: B.M. Rezioul Karim.
- Faculty: 08
- Grades: Starting from 11
- Gender: Co-educational
- Age range: 16-30
- Enrollment: 12,000
- Language: Bengali
- Campus size: 2.5 acres (10,000 m^{2})
- Campus type: Sub-urban
- Website: www.kccollege.edu.bd

Govt. K. C. College is a co-educational Bangladeshi Government college. It was established in 1960 by the then Pakistani government. The college is situated in the heart of Jhenaidah. There are 12,000 students both male and female who study here. Local MP(Member of Parliament) is the president of the managing committee.

== History ==
Govt. K. C. College is one of the most important colleges in Bangladesh. It was established in 1960 by the then Pakistani government. The college is situated in the heart of Jhenaidah. There are about 12,000 students both male and female who study here. Local MP (Member of Parliament) is the president of the managing committee.
