= Shailkupa Upazila =

Shailkupa শৈলকুপা
- Upazila
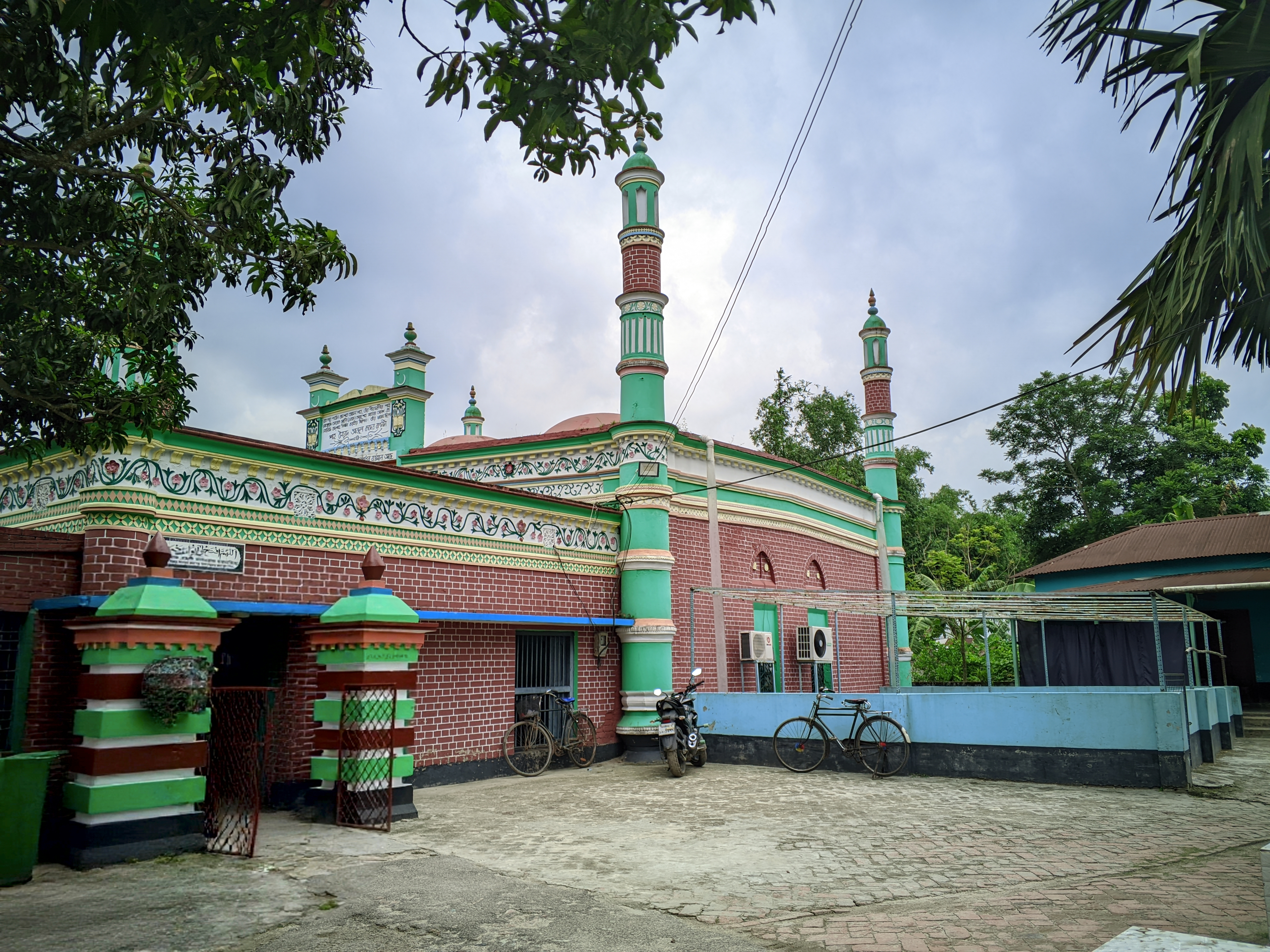
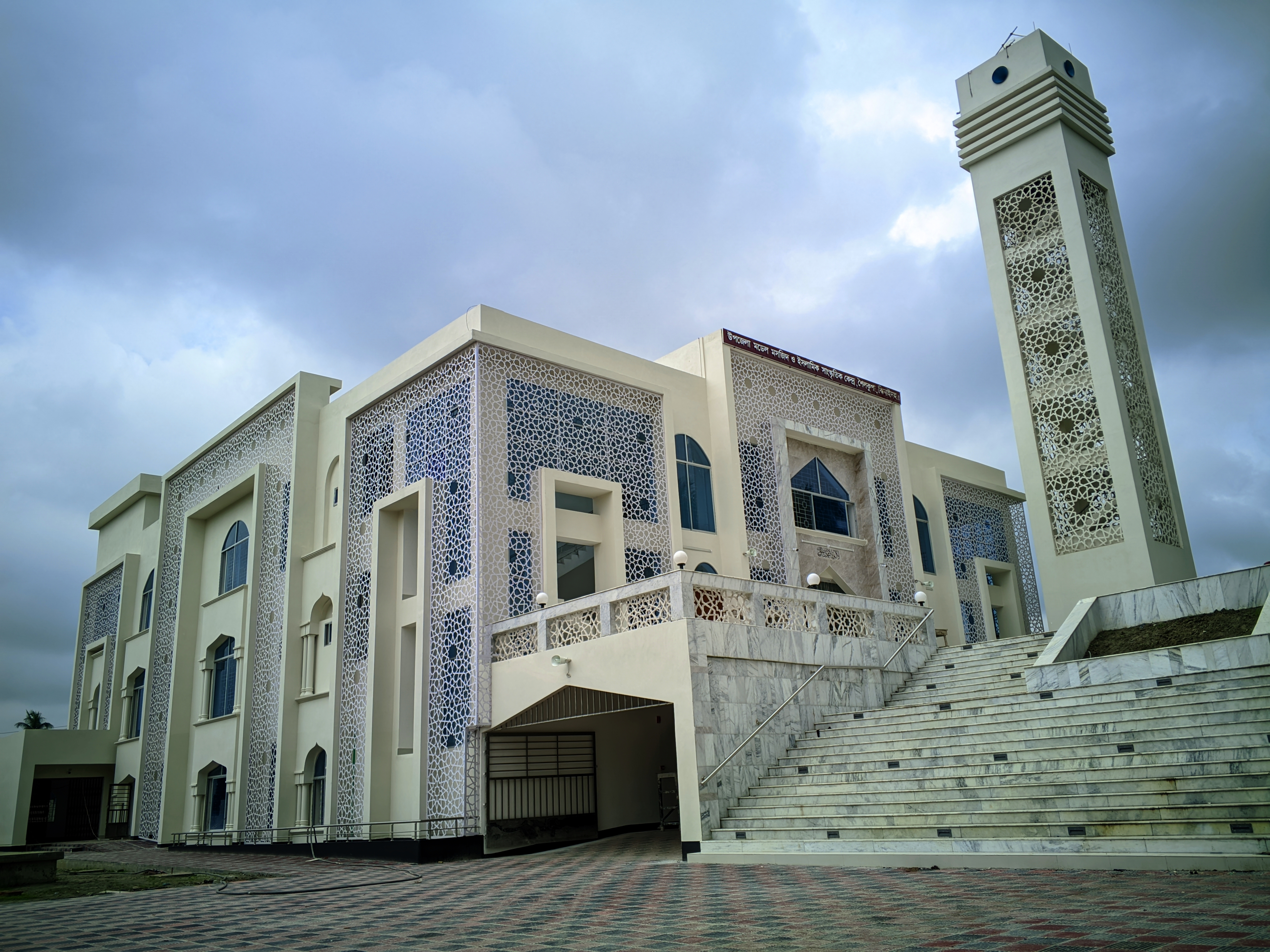
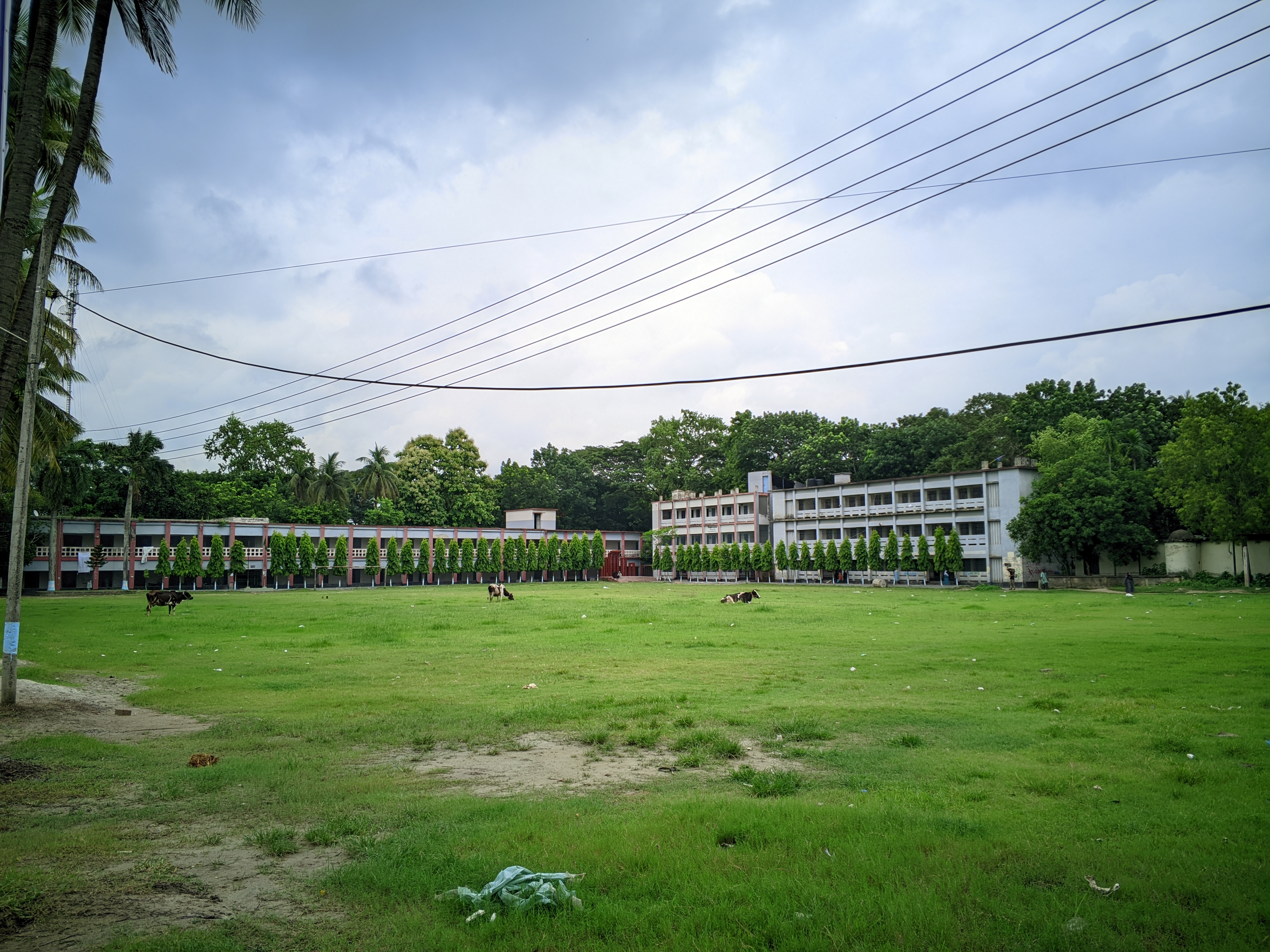
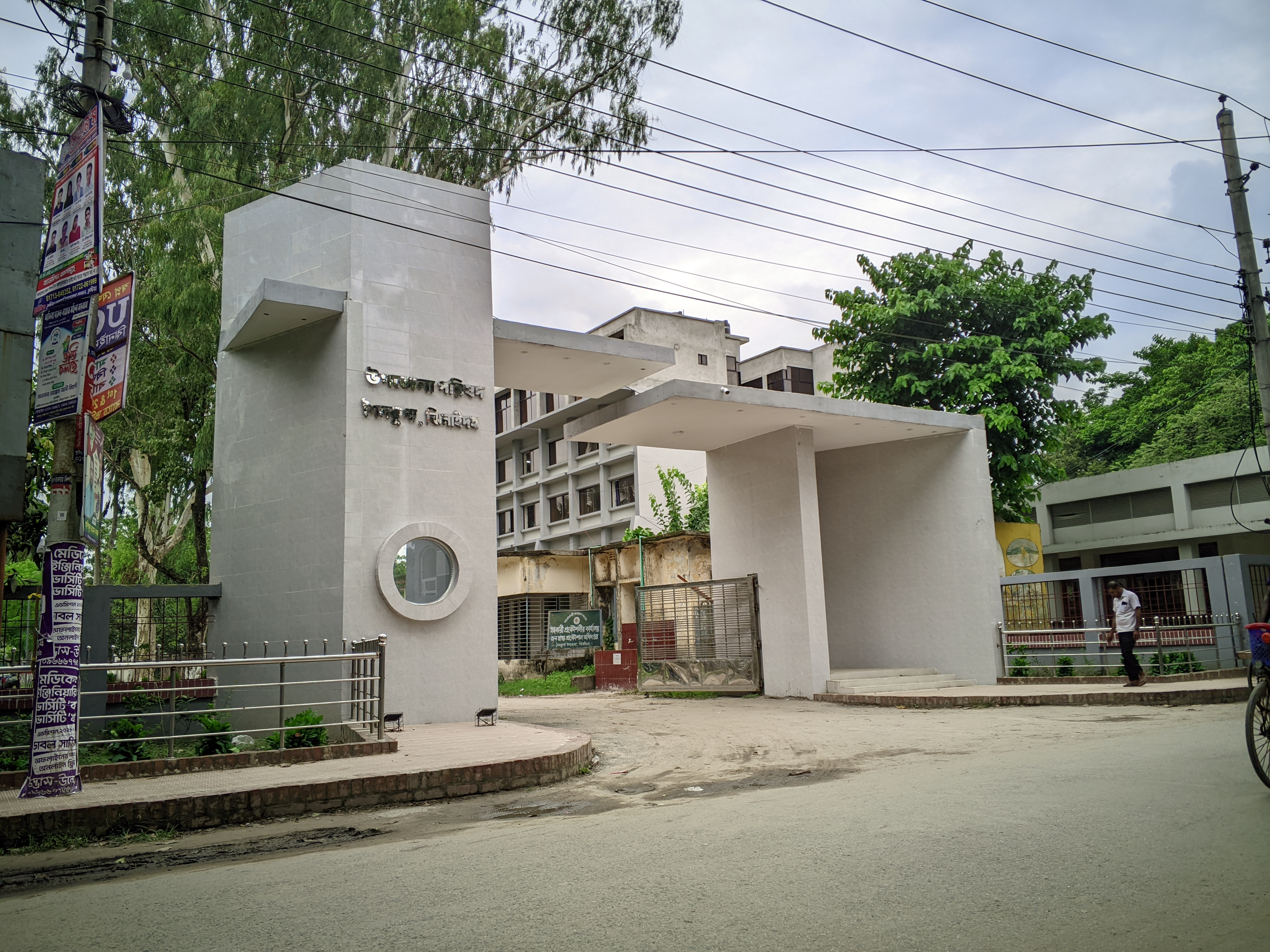
- From top: Shailkupa Shahi Mosque, Shailkupa Model Mosque, Shailkupa Govt. College, and Upazila Parishad Entrance

- Coordinates: 23°41.5′N 89°15′E
- Country: Bangladesh
- Division: Khulna
- District: Jhenaidah

Area
  - Total: 373.43 km^{2} (144.18 sq mi)

Population (2022)
  - Total: 406,744
  - Density: 1,089.2/km^{2} (2,821.0/sq mi)
- Time zone: UTC+6 (BST)
- Postal code: 7320
- Website: shailkupa.jhenaidah.gov.bd

Shailkupa Upazila mauza geocode map

Shailkupa (Bengali: শৈলকুপা) is an upazila of Jhenaidah District in Khulna Division, Bangladesh.

== Geography ==
It has a total area of 373.43 km^{2}. It is located in between 23°34' and 23°46' north latitudes and 89°07' and 89°23' east longitudes. It is bounded by Kushtia and Rajbari districts to the north, Jhenaidah Sadar Upazila to the south, Magura district to the east and Harinakunda upazila to the west. The distance from the district headquarters to Shailkupa upazila is 22 kilometers.

The river Gorai flows to the north-east of Shailkupa while the main town is located on the river Kumar.

== History ==
In the Pleistocene era, in the middle of the formation of the land of Bangladesh, the land formed in this region by the sandy soil of the Ganga River of the Bengal delta and the settlement of people continued to grow. Although there is no significant information about the prehistoric period, the first human settlement was developed in this area in the second millennium BC. In ancient times, people of various ethnic groups started to live in search of a fertile land for livelihood and developed human habitation here. In the anthropological analysis, a Shankar Nation settled in this region in the mix of small sections of different ethnic groups. The Austric influence is much more pronounced in terms of language strains in this region. According to the writings of Greek and Latin historians, this region was known as Gangaridai, a powerful nation whose capital was Gangarzia. Pareshnath Majumdar presumed this Gangarajaya belongs to Jessore district, which is mentioned in the history book of Satish Chandra Mitra's Jessore-Khulna. It was under the Maurya Empire between 500 and 200 BC. Later it came under the Samatata Kingdom during the reign of Samudragupta (340-380). In the Gupta era, the Samatata state is divided into administrative units namely Bhukti, Bisoy, Mandal, Bithi and Gram. When Ballana Sena (1160-1179) ruled the Bengal region, Karkata Nag established a kingdom in Shailkupa opposing the Sena caste system. It came under the British rule in 1786, and Shailkupa thana was established in 1863. In 1889, the people of 48 villages revolted against the British in the historic Indigo Revolt. During Pakistan period (1947-1971), Shailkupa was an important administrative unit. Hundreds of freedom fighters participated in the Liberation War of Bangladesh and freed Shailkupa from Pakistani occupation forces on 13 November 1971.

== Naming ==
Though there is no significant document about how Shailakupa was named or what is the source of naming, but there are some source of naming in various articles. Many people said that during the reign of Sultan Nasir Uddin Shailkupa was Nasirabad. An ancient mound can be found in the village of Harihara near Shailkupa. It was estimated that it was the house of a powerful Hindu feudal king named Medieval Harihar Raja. During this time, a commander of the dynasty sent an army commander to settle in the area and now settled at Pathanpara near Shailkupa. Then there is the love of Shailabala, daughter of Harihara, with a son of the Pathan tribe. At one stage, the youngster came to the bank of the river to ride with the shailabala. King Harihara send people in different areas to find the daughter. Shailabala is caught with her boyfriend at the hands of the king's people. When he sent the news to the king, he came to the bank of the Kumar river along with the soldier and could not control angry and killed his daughter with a sword. For this the people named Shailakupa after the name of Shailabala.

== Administration ==
Shailkupa Upazila is divided into Shailkupa Municipality and 14 union parishads: Abaipur, Bogura, Dignagore, Dhaloharachandra, Dubshar, Fulhari, Hakimpur, Kancherkol, Monoharpur, Mirzapur, Nityanandapur, Sarutia, Tribeni, and Umedpur. The union parishads are subdivided into 181 mouzas and 264 villages.

Shailkupa Municipality is subdivided into 9 wards and 24 mahallas.

== Demographics ==
Religions in Shailkupa Upazila (2022)
Religion	Percent
Islam	90.59%
Hinduism	9.38%
Other or not stated	0.03%

According to the 2022 Bangladeshi census, Shailkupa Upazila had 100,764 households and a population of 406,744. 8.73% of the population were under 5 years of age. Shailkupa had a literacy rate (age 7 and over) of 71.63%: 73.87% for males and 69.43% for females, and a sex ratio of 98.76 males for every 100 females. 51,075 (12.56%) lived in urban areas.

As of the 2011 Census of Bangladesh, Shailkupa upazila had 83,348 households and a population of 361,648. 74,821 (20.69%) were under 10 years of age. Shailkupa had an average literacy rate of 47.18%, compared to the national average of 51.8%, and a sex ratio of 1000 females per 1000 males. 35,271 (9.75%) of the population lived in urban areas.

It has 51,595 households. As of the 1991 Bangladesh census, Shailkupa has a population of 293,341. Males constitute 51.43% of the population, and females 48.57%. The adult population numbers 151,516. Shailkupa has an average literacy rate of 66.3% (7+ years) compared to the national average of 32.4%.

== Heritage ==
Shailkupa Shahi mosque, which is situated on the bank of the Kumer river, is a remarkable sign of the martyrdom of the Sultanate in southern Bengal. The mosque is in dargapara of Shailkupa. The length of the tall mosque in the north–south (inward) 31.5 ^ 21 feet. The walls are about 5.5 feet wide. There are four domes in the four corner of the mosque. It is ornamented by round and swirling bands. The monuments rise above the mosque. The eastern wall of the mosque has two entrances and two entrance in north and south walls. The central entrance of the eastern wall has a solid monument on either side and it is slightly lower than the corner tower. The carnival of the mosque is paved; inside the west wall three mehrab, Central Mehrab is larger in size. The five feet high two pillar are in the mosque. Above them are brick arches. Six domes were built on these two euphemisms and on the four sides of the wall. These are quite small in size. The mosque is mainly made of brick. There is so much reform and addition to this mosque that it is not easy to properly solve what its original structure was. The central entrance and the angle of the monuments may possibly be later added. However, it is easy to understand the mosque of the Sultanate period.

27 martyrs of Kamanna: 1971's Liberation war of Shailkupa has become history. Shailkupa has been freed On the consequence of 5 April war of Alfapur, 4 August of Alfapur, 13 October in the battle of Abipur, 26 November in the battle of Kamnana and on 8 April, 6 August, 17 August and 11 November Shailakupa Thana attack. The liberation army lifted the red green flag of independent Bangladesh. On 27 November 1971, in the evening of Kamna, 27 soldiers were killed in a massacre of the Pakistani occupation army. More than half of the villagers were injured. After the successful training from India, 42 freedom fighters took shelter at Madhab Chandra's house in Kamannah. Their home in Sripur, Magura Sadar and Shailkupa upazila, Alamgir of Shailakupa Malithia village and Abubakar of Sripur were among them.

== Education ==
There are 13 colleges in the upazila:

- Abaipur Jamuna Shikder College,
- Adil Uddin College
- Bangabandhu Memorial College,
- Bir Muktijoddha Abdul Hyee College,
- Jarip Biswas Degree College, Kancher Kole College,
- Katlagari Degree College,
- Miah Jinnah Alam Degree College, *Muktijoddha Abdus Sattar Shikder College,
- Shailkupa City Degree College,
- Shailkupa Government Degree College,
- Shailkupa Mohila Degree College, and
- Sheikh Para Dukhi Mahamud Degree College.

According to Banglapedia, Abaipur Ramsundar Secondary School, founded in 1889, Benipur Multilateral High School (1906), Falia Shahadev Secondary School (1922), Fulhari Secondary School (1929), Nagerhat High School (1881), and Shailkupa Pilot High School (1893) are notable secondary schools.

== Notable residents ==
- Abdul Hyee- The Honourable Member of Parliament for constituency Jhenaidah-1 since 2001 & Freedom fighter of the Liberation war of Bangladesh as the commander of Shailkupa Upazila Mujib Bahini.
- Bashiruddin Ahmad Majmadar, politician, was born in Hudamailmari village in 1898, and attended Jhenaidah Government High School.
- Golam Mostofa, poet, was born at Manoharpur village in 1897, and attended Shailkupa High School.
- Mustafa Monwar, painter, sculptor, radio performer and professor of fine arts, was born in Shailkupa on 1 September 1935. He is currently the chairman of Bangladesh Shishu Academy. He was awarded Ekushey Padak in 2004 by the Government of Bangladesh.
- Panju Shah Fakir (1851-1914), poet and mystic, was born in Shailkupa, jhenaidah. Some of his songs were compiled in a book titled Bhavsabgit written by his son, Khandaker Rafiquddin.
- Sheikh Mohammad Asaduzzaman, 17th Attorney General of Bangladesh
- Ila Mitra (née Sen; 18 October 1925 – 13 October 2002) was a peasants movement organizer of the Indian subcontinent, especially in East Bengal (now Bangladesh).
