= List of members of the 11th Jatiya Sangsad =

11th Jatiya Sangsad
←	10th	12th	→
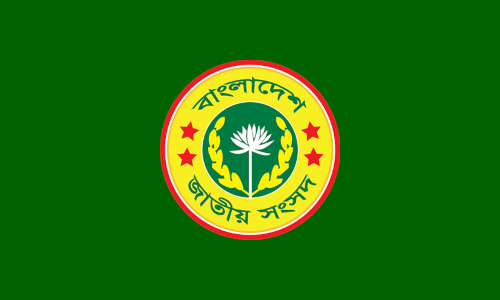
- Flag of the Jatiya Sangsad

Overview
- Legislative body: Bangladesh Parliament
- Term: 30 January 2019 – 29 January 2024
- Election: 2018
- Government: Awami League
- Opposition: Jatiya Party (Ershad)

Sovereign
- President: Mohammad Abdul Hamid; Mohammed Shahabuddin

House of the Nation
- Speaker: Shirin Sharmin Chaudhury
- Deputy Speaker: Fazle Rabbi Miah; Shamsul Hoque Tuku
- Parliament Leader: Sheikh Hasina
- Opposition Leader: Hussain Muhammad Ershad; Rowshan Ershad

The following is a list of Members of Parliament (MPs) elected to the Jatiya Sangsad (National Parliament of Bangladesh) from 300 Bangladeshi constituencies for the 11th Parliament of Bangladesh.

It includes both MPs elected at the 2018 general election, held on 30 December 2018. Nominated women's members for reserved seat and Those subsequently elected in by-elections.

== Members ==
=== Member of Parliament ===
Constituency		Name	Party
1	Panchagarh-1	Mazharul Haque Prodhan	Awami League
2	Panchagarh-2	Md. Nurul Islam Sujon	Awami League
3	Thakurgaon-1	Ramesh Chandra Sen	Awami League
4	Thakurgaon-2	Dabirul Islam	Awami League
5	Thakurgaon-3	Jahidur Rahman Resigned: 11 December 2022	Bangladesh Nationalist Party
5	Thakurgaon-3	Hafiz Uddin Ahmed By-election: 1 February 2023	Jatiya Party (Ershad)
6	Dinajpur-1	Manoranjan Shill Gopal	Awami League
7	Dinajpur-2	Khalid Mahmud Chowdhury	Awami League
8	Dinajpur-3	Iqbalur Rahim	Awami League
9	Dinajpur-4	Abul Hassan Mahmood Ali	Awami League
10	Dinajpur-5	Mostafizur Rahman Fizar	Awami League
11	Dinajpur-6	Shibli Sadique	Awami League
12	Nilphamari-1	Aftab Uddin Sarkar	Awami League
13	Nilphamari-2	Asaduzzaman Noor	Awami League
14	Nilphamari-3	Rana Mohammad Sohail	Jatiya Party (Ershad)
15	Nilphamari-4	Ahsan Adelur Rahman	Jatiya Party (Ershad)
16	Lalmonirhat-1	Motahar Hossain	Awami League
17	Lalmonirhat-2	Nuruzzaman Ahmed	Awami League
18	Lalmonirhat-3	Ghulam Muhammed Quader	Jatiya Party (Ershad)
19	Rangpur-1	Mashiur Rahaman Ranga	Jatiya Party (Ershad)
20	Rangpur-2	Abul Kalam Md. Ahsanul Haque Chowdhury	Awami League
21	Rangpur-3	Hussain Muhammad Ershad Died: 14 July 2019	Jatiya Party (Ershad)
21	Rangpur-3	Rahgir Almahe Ershad By-election: 5 October 2019	Jatiya Party (Ershad)
22	Rangpur-4	Tipu Munshi	Awami League
23	Rangpur-5	H. N. Ashequr Rahman	Awami League
24	Rangpur-6	Shirin Sharmin Chowdhury	Awami League
25	Kurigram-1	Aslam Hossain Saudagar	Awami League
26	Kurigram-2	Ponir Uddin Ahmed	Jatiya Party (Ershad)
27	Kurigram-3	M. A. Matin	Awami League
28	Kurigram-4	Md Zakir Hossain	Awami League
29	Gaibandha-1	Shamim Haider Patwary	Jatiya Party (Ershad)
30	Gaibandha-2	Mahabub Ara Begum Gini	Awami League
31	Gaibandha-3	Eunus Ali Sarkar Died: 27 December 2019	Awami League
31	Gaibandha-3	Umme Kulsum Smrity By-election: 21 March 2020	Awami League
32	Gaibandha-4	Monowar Hossain Chowdhury	Awami League
33	Gaibandha-5	Fazle Rabbi Miah Died: 22 July 2022	Awami League
33	Gaibandha-5	Mahmud Hasan Ripon By-election: 4 January 2023	Awami League
34	Joypurhat-1	Shamsul Alam Dudu	Awami League
35	Joypurhat-2	Abu Sayeed Al Mahmood Swapon	Awami League
36	Bogra-1	Abdul Mannan Died: 18 January 2020	Awami League
36	Bogra-1	Shahadara Mannan By-election: 14 July 2020	Awami League
37	Bogra-2	Shariful Islam Jinnah	Jatiya Party (Ershad)
38	Bogra-3	Nurul Islam Talukder	Jatiya Party (Ershad)
39	Bogra-4	Mosharraf Hossain Resigned: 11 December 2022	Bangladesh Nationalist Party
39	Bogra-4	A. K. M. Rezaul Karim Tansen By-election: 1 February 2023	Jatiya Samajtantrik Dal
40	Bogra-5	Habibar Rahman	Awami League
41	Bogra-6	Mirza Fakhrul Islam Alamgir Elected, but not sworn	Bangladesh Nationalist Party
41	Bogra-6	Golam Mohammad Siraj By-election: 24 June 2019; Resigned: 11 December 2022	Bangladesh Nationalist Party
41	Bogra-6	Ragebul Ahsan Ripu By-election: 1 February 2023	Awami League
42	Bogra-7	Rezaul Karim Bablu	Independent
43	Chapai Nawabganj-1	Shamil Uddin Ahmed Shimul	Awami League
44	Chapai Nawabganj-2	Aminul Islam Resigned: 11 December 2022	Bangladesh Nationalist Party
44	Chapai Nawabganj-2	Md. Ziaur Rahman By-election: 1 February 2023	Awami League
45	Chapai Nawabganj-3	Harunur Rashid Resigned: 23 December 2022	Bangladesh Nationalist Party
45	Chapai Nawabganj-3	Md. Abdul Odud By-election: 1 February 2023	Awami League
46	Naogaon-1	Sadhan Chandra Majumder	Awami League
47	Naogaon-2	Shahiduzzaman Sarker	Awami League
48	Naogaon-3	Salim Uddin Tarafder	Awami League
49	Naogaon-4	Emaz Uddin Pramanik	Awami League
50	Naogaon-5	Nizam Uddin Jalil	Awami League
51	Naogaon-6	Israfil Alam Died: 27 July 2020	Awami League
51	Naogaon-6	Anwar Hossain Helal By-election: 17 October 2020	Awami League
52	Rajshahi-1	Omor Faruk Chowdhury	Awami League
53	Rajshahi-2	Fazle Hossain Badsha	Workers Party of Bangladesh
54	Rajshahi-3	Ayeen Uddin	Awami League
55	Rajshahi-4	Enamul Haque	Awami League
56	Rajshahi-5	Mansur Rahman	Awami League
57	Rajshahi-6	Shahriar Alam	Awami League
58	Natore-1	Shahidul Islam Bakul	Awami League
59	Natore-2	Shafiqul Islam Shimul	Awami League
60	Natore-3	Zunaid Ahmed Palak	Awami League
61	Natore-4	Abdul Quddus Died: 30 August 2023	Awami League
61	Natore-4	Siddiqur Rahman Patwari By-election: 24 September 2023	Awami League
62	Sirajganj-1	Mohammed Nasim Died: 13 June 2020	Awami League
62	Sirajganj-1	Tanvir Shakil Joy By-election: 12 November 2020	Awami League
63	Sirajganj-2	Habibe Millat	Awami League
64	Sirajganj-3	Abdul Aziz	Awami League
65	Sirajganj-4	Tanveer Imam	Awami League
66	Sirajganj-5	Abdul Majid Mandal	Awami League
67	Sirajganj-6	Hashibur Rahman Swapon Died: 2 September 2021	Awami League
67	Sirajganj-6	Merina Jahan Kabita By-election: 2 November 2021	Awami League
68	Pabna-1	Shamsul Haque Tuku	Awami League
69	Pabna-2	Ahmed Firoz Kabir	Awami League
70	Pabna-3	Md. Mokbul Hossain	Awami League
71	Pabna-4	Shamsur Rahman Sherif Died: 2 April 2020	Awami League
71	Pabna-4	Nuruzzaman Biswas By-election: 26 September 2020	Awami League
72	Pabna-5	Golam Faruk Khandakar Prince	Awami League
73	Meherpur-1	Farhad Hossain	Awami League
74	Meherpur-2	Mohammad Shahiduzzaman	Awami League
75	Kushtia-1	AKM Sarwar Jahan Badsha	Awami League
76	Kushtia-2	Hasanul Haq Inu	Jatiya Samajtantrik Dal
77	Kushtia-3	Mahbubul Alam Hanif	Awami League
78	Kushtia-4	Selim Altaf Gorge	Awami League
79	Chuadanga-1	Solaiman Haque Joarder	Awami League
80	Chuadanga-2	Md. Ali Azgar	Awami League
81	Jhenaidah-1	Abdul Hyee	Awami League
82	Jhenaidah-2	Tahjib Alam Siddique	Awami League
83	Jhenaidah-3	Shafiqul Azam Khan	Awami League
84	Jhenaidah-4	Anwarul Azim Anar	Awami League
85	Jessore-1	Sheikh Afil Uddin	Awami League
86	Jessore-2	Nasir Uddin	Awami League
87	Jessore-3	Kazi Nabil Ahmed	Awami League
88	Jessore-4	Ranajit Kumar Roy	Awami League
89	Jessore-5	Swapan Bhattacharjee	Awami League
90	Jessore-6	Ismat Ara Sadek Died: 21 January 2020	Awami League
90	Jessore-6	Shahin Chakladar By-election: 14 July 2020	Awami League
91	Magura-1	Md. Shifuzzaman	Awami League
92	Magura-2	Biren Sikder	Awami League
93	Narail-1	Md. Kabirul Haque	Awami League
94	Narail-2	Mashrafe Bin Mortaza	Awami League
95	Bagerhat-1	Sheikh Helal	Awami League
96	Bagerhat-2	Sheikh Tonmoy	Awami League
97	Bagerhat-3	Habibun Nahar	Awami League
98	Bagerhat-4	Mozammel Hossain Died: 10 January 2020	Awami League
98	Bagerhat-4	Amirul Alam Milon By-election: 21 March 2020	Awami League
99	Khulna-1	Panchanan Biswas	Awami League
100	Khulna-2	Sheikh Salahuddin Jewel	Awami League
101	Khulna-3	Monnujan Sufian	Awami League
102	Khulna-4	Salam Murshedy	Awami League
103	Khulna-5	Narayon Chandra Chanda	Awami League
104	Khulna-6	Akhteruzzaman Babu	Awami League
105	Satkhira-1	Mustafa Lutfullah	Workers Party of Bangladesh
106	Satkhira-2	Mir Mostaque Ahmed Robi	Awami League
107	Satkhira-3	AFM Ruhal Haque	Awami League
108	Satkhira-4	S. M. Jaglul Hayder	Awami League
109	Barguna-1	Dhirendra Debnath Shambhu	Awami League
110	Barguna-2	Showkat Hasanur Rahman Rimon	Awami League
111	Patuakhali-1	Shahjahan Mia Died: 21 October 2023	Awami League
111	Patuakhali-1	Afzal Hossain By-election: 9 November 2023	Awami League
112	Patuakhali-2	A. S. M. Feroz	Awami League
113	Patuakhali-3	SM Shahjada	Awami League
114	Patuakhali-4	Muhibur Rahman Muhib	Awami League
115	Bhola-1	Tofail Ahmed	Awami League
116	Bhola-2	Ali Azam	Awami League
117	Bhola-3	Nurunnabi Chowdhury Shaon	Awami League
118	Bhola-4	Abdullah Al Islam Jakob	Awami League
119	Barisal-1	Abul Hasanat Abdullah	Awami League
120	Barisal-2	Shah-e-Alam	Awami League
121	Barisal-3	Golam Kibria Tipu	Jatiya Party (Ershad)
122	Barisal-4	Pankaj Nath	Awami League
123	Barisal-5	Zaheed Farooque	Awami League
124	Barisal-6	Nasreen Jahan Ratna	Jatiya Party (Ershad)
125	Jhalokati-1	Bazlul Haque Haroon	Awami League
126	Jhalokati-2	Amir Hossain Amu	Awami League
127	Pirojpur-1	S. M. Rezaul Karim	Awami League
128	Pirojpur-2	Anwar Hossain Manju	Jatiya Party (Manju)
129	Pirojpur-3	Md. Rustum Ali Faraji	Jatiya Party (Ershad)
130	Tangail-1	Mohammad Abdur Razzaque	Awami League
131	Tangail-2	Tanvir Hasan Choto Monir	Awami League
132	Tangail-3	Ataur Rahman Khan	Awami League
133	Tangail-4	Hasan Imam Khan Sohel Hazari	Awami League
134	Tangail-5	Md. Sanowar Hossain	Awami League
135	Tangail-6	Ahsanul Islam Titu	Awami League
136	Tangail-7	Md. Akabbar Hossain Died: 16 November 2021	Awami League
136	Tangail-7	Khan Ahmed Shuvo By-election: 22 January 2022	Awami League
137	Tangail-8	Joaherul Islam	Awami League
138	Jamalpur-1	Abul Kalam Azad	Awami League
139	Jamalpur-2	Md. Faridul Haq Khan	Awami League
140	Jamalpur-3	Mirza Azam	Awami League
141	Jamalpur-4	Murad Hasan	Awami League
142	Jamalpur-5	Mozaffar Hossain	Awami League
143	Sherpur-1	Md. Atiur Rahman Atik	Awami League
144	Sherpur-2	Matia Chowdhury	Awami League
145	Sherpur-3	AKM Fazlul Haque	Awami League
146	Mymensingh-1	Jewel Areng	Awami League
147	Mymensingh-2	Sharif Ahmed	Awami League
148	Mymensingh-3	Nazim Uddin Ahmed	Awami League
149	Mymensingh-4	Rowshan Ershad	Jatiya Party (Ershad)
150	Mymensingh-5	K. M. Khalid	Awami League
151	Mymensingh-6	Moslem Uddin	Awami League
152	Mymensingh-7	Ruhul Amin Madani	Awami League
153	Mymensingh-8	Fakhrul Imam	Jatiya Party (Ershad)
154	Mymensingh-9	Anwarul Abedin Khan	Awami League
155	Mymensingh-10	Fahmi Gulandaz Babel	Awami League
156	Mymensingh-11	Kazim Uddin Ahmed	Awami League
157	Netrokona-1	Manu Majumdar	Awami League
158	Netrokona-2	Ashraf Ali Khan Khasru	Awami League
159	Netrokona-3	Ashim Kumar Ukil	Awami League
160	Netrokona-4	Rebecca Momin Died: 11 July 2023	Awami League
160	Netrokona-4	Sajjadul Hassan By-election: 30 July 2023	Awami League
161	Netrokona-5	Waresat Hussain Belal	Awami League
162	Kishoreganj-1	Sayed Ashraful Islam Elected, but Died: 3 January 2019	Awami League
162	Kishoreganj-1	Syeda Zakia Noor Lipi By-election: 10 February 2019	Awami League
163	Kishoreganj-2	Nur Mohammad	Awami League
164	Kishoreganj-3	Mujibul Haque Chunnu	Jatiya Party (Ershad)
165	Kishoreganj-4	Rejwan Ahammad Taufiq	Awami League
166	Kishoreganj-5	Md. Afzal Hossain	Awami League
167	Kishoreganj-6	Nazmul Hassan Papon	Awami League
168	Manikganj-1	Naimur Rahman Durjoy	Awami League
169	Manikganj-2	Momtaz Begum	Awami League
170	Manikganj-3	Zahid Maleque	Awami League
171	Munshiganj-1	Mahi Badruddoza Chowdhury	Bikalpa Dhara Bangladesh
172	Munshiganj-2	Sagufta Yasmin Emily	Awami League
173	Munshiganj-3	Mrinal Kanti Das	Awami League
174	Dhaka-1	Salman F Rahman	Awami League
175	Dhaka-2	Qamrul Islam	Awami League
176	Dhaka-3	Nasrul Hamid	Awami League
177	Dhaka-4	Sayed Abu Hossain Babla	Jatiya Party (Ershad)
178	Dhaka-5	Habibur Rahman Mollah Died: 6 May 2020	Awami League
178	Dhaka-5	Kazi Monirul Islam Manu By-election: 17 October 2020	Awami League
179	Dhaka-6	Kazi Firoz Rashid	Jatiya Party (Ershad)
180	Dhaka-7	Haji Mohammad Salim	Awami League
181	Dhaka-8	Rashed Khan Menon	Workers Party of Bangladesh
182	Dhaka-9	Saber Hossain Chowdhury	Awami League
183	Dhaka-10	Sheikh Fazle Noor Taposh Resigned: 29 December 2019	Awami League
183	Dhaka-10	Shafiul Islam Mohiuddin By-election: 21 March 2020	Awami League
184	Dhaka-11	A.K.M. Rahmatullah	Awami League
185	Dhaka-12	Asaduzzaman Khan	Awami League
186	Dhaka-13	Md. Sadek Khan	Awami League
187	Dhaka-14	Aslamul Haque Died: 4 April 2021	Awami League
187	Dhaka-14	Aga Khan Mintu By-election: 24 June 2021	Awami League
188	Dhaka-15	Kamal Ahmed Majumder	Awami League
189	Dhaka-16	Elias Mollah	Awami League
190	Dhaka-17	Akbar Hossain Pathan Farooque Died: 15 May 2023	Awami League
190	Dhaka-17	Mohammad Ali Arafat By-election: 17 July 2023	Awami League
191	Dhaka-18	Sahara Khatun Died: 9 July 2020	Awami League
191	Dhaka-18	Mohammad Habib Hasan By-election: 12 November 2020	Awami League
192	Dhaka-19	Md. Enamur Rahaman	Awami League
193	Dhaka-20	Benzir Ahmed	Awami League
194	Gazipur-1	AKM Mozammel Haque	Awami League
195	Gazipur-2	Zahid Ahsan Russel	Awami League
196	Gazipur-3	Iqbal Hossain Sabuj	Awami League
197	Gazipur-4	Simeen Hussain Rimi	Awami League
198	Gazipur-5	Meher Afroz Chumki	Awami League
199	Narsingdi-1	Muhammad Nazrul Islam	Awami League
200	Narsingdi-2	Anwarul Ashraf Khan	Awami League
201	Narsingdi-3	Zahirul Haque Bhuiyan Mohan	Awami League
202	Narsingdi-4	Nurul Majid Mahmud Humayun	Awami League
203	Narsingdi-5	Rajiuddin Ahmed Raju	Awami League
204	Narayanganj-1	Golam Dastagir Gazi	Awami League
205	Narayanganj-2	Nazrul Islam Babu	Awami League
206	Narayanganj-3	Liyakot Hossain Khoka	Jatiya Party (Ershad)
207	Narayanganj-4	Shamim Osman	Awami League
208	Narayanganj-5	Salim Osman	Jatiya Party (Ershad)
209	Rajbari-1	Kazi Keramat Ali	Awami League
210	Rajbari-2	Zillul Hakim	Awami League
211	Faridpur-1	Manjur Hossain	Awami League
212	Faridpur-2	Syeda Sajeda Chowdhury Died: 11 September 2022	Awami League
212	Faridpur-2	Shahdab Akbar Chowdhury By-election: 5 November 2022	Awami League
213	Faridpur-3	Khandaker Mosharraf Hossain	Awami League
214	Faridpur-4	Mujibur Rahman Chowdhury Nixon	Independent
215	Gopalganj-1	Faruk Khan	Awami League
216	Gopalganj-2	Sheikh Fazlul Karim Selim	Awami League
217	Gopalganj-3	Sheikh Hasina	Awami League
218	Madaripur-1	Noor-E-Alam Chowdhury Liton	Awami League
219	Madaripur-2	Shajahan Khan	Awami League
220	Madaripur-3	Abdus Sobhan Golap	Awami League
221	Shariatpur-1	Iqbal Hossain Apu	Awami League
222	Shariatpur-2	AKM Enamul Haque Shamim	Awami League
223	Shariatpur-3	Nahim Razzaq	Awami League
224	Sunamganj-1	Moazzem Hossain Ratan	Awami League
225	Sunamganj-2	Joya Sengupta	Awami League
226	Sunamganj-3	M. A. Mannan	Awami League
227	Sunamganj-4	Pir Fazlur Rahman	Jatiya Party (Ershad)
228	Sunamganj-5	Mohibur Rahman Manik	Awami League
229	Sylhet-1	AK Abdul Momen	Awami League
230	Sylhet-2	Mokabbir Khan	Gano Forum
231	Sylhet-3	Mahmud Us Samad Chowdhury Died: 11 March 2021	Awami League
231	Sylhet-3	Habibur Rahman Habib By-election: 4 September 2021	Awami League
232	Sylhet-4	Imran Ahmad	Awami League
233	Sylhet-5	Hafiz Ahmed Mazumder	Awami League
234	Sylhet-6	Nurul Islam Nahid	Awami League
235	Moulvibazar-1	Md. Shahab Uddin	Awami League
236	Moulvibazar-2	Sultan Mohammad Mansur Ahmed	Gano Forum
237	Moulvibazar-3	Nesar Ahmed	Awami League
238	Moulvibazar-4	Mohammed Abdus Shahid	Awami League
239	Habiganj-1	Gazi Mohammad Shahnawaz	Awami League
240	Habiganj-2	Md. Abdul Majid Khan	Awami League
241	Habiganj-3	Md. Abu Zahir	Awami League
242	Habiganj-4	Md. Mahbub Ali	Awami League
243	Brahmanbaria-1	Bodruddoza Md. Farhad Hossain	Awami League
244	Brahmanbaria-2	Ukil Abdus Sattar Bhuiyan Expelled from BNP: 2 January 2023; By-election (Re-elected): 1 February 2023; Died: 30 September 2023	Bangladesh Nationalist Party
244	Brahmanbaria-2	Ukil Abdus Sattar Bhuiyan Expelled from BNP: 2 January 2023; By-election (Re-elected): 1 February 2023; Died: 30 September 2023	Independent (After by-election)
244	Brahmanbaria-2	Shahjahan Alam Shaju By-election: 5 November 2023	Awami League
245	Brahmanbaria-3	Obaidul Muktadir Chowdhury	Awami League
246	Brahmanbaria-4	Anisul Huq	Awami League
247	Brahmanbaria-5	Mohammad Ebadul Karim Bulbul	Awami League
248	Brahmanbaria-6	A. B. Tajul Islam	Awami League
249	Comilla-1	Mohammad Shubid Ali Bhuiyan	Awami League
250	Comilla-2	Selima Ahmad	Awami League
251	Comilla-3	Yussuf Abdullah Harun	Awami League
252	Comilla-4	Razee Mohammad Fakhrul	Awami League
253	Comilla-5	Abdul Matin Khasru Died: 14 April 2021	Awami League
253	Comilla-5	Abul Hashem Khan By-election: 24 June 2021	Awami League
254	Comilla-6	A. K. M. Bahauddin Baharl	Awami League
255	Comilla-7	Ali Ashraf Died: 30 July 2021	Awami League
255	Comilla-7	Pran Gopal Datta By-election: 20 September 2021	Awami League
256	Comilla-8	Nasimul Alam Chowdhury	Awami League
257	Comilla-9	Mohammad Tazul Islam	Awami League
258	Comilla-10	A. H. M. Mustafa Kamal	Awami League
259	Comilla-11	Mujibul Haque Mujib	Awami League
260	Chandpur-1	Muhiuddin Khan Alamgir	Awami League
261	Chandpur-2	Nurul Amin Ruhul	Awami League
262	Chandpur-3	Dipu Moni	Awami League
263	Chandpur-4	Muhammad Shafiqur Rahman	Awami League
264	Chandpur-5	Rafiqul Islam	Awami League
265	Feni-1	Shirin Akhter	Jatiya Samajtantrik Dal
266	Feni-2	Nizam Uddin Hazari	Awami League
267	Feni-3	Masud Uddin Chowdhury	Jatiya Party (Ershad)
268	Noakhali-1	H. M. Ibrahim	Awami League
269	Noakhali-2	Morshed Alam	Awami League
270	Noakhali-3	Mamunur Rashid Kiron	Awami League
271	Noakhali-4	Ekramul Karim Chowdhury	Awami League
272	Noakhali-5	Obaidul Quader	Awami League
273	Noakhali-6	Ayesha Ferdaus	Awami League
274	Lakshmipur-1	Anwar Hossain Khan	Awami League
275	Lakshmipur-2	Mohammad Shahid Islam Expelled: 22 February 2021	Independent
275	Lakshmipur-2	Nuruddin Chowdhury Noyon By-election: 21 June 2021	Awami League
276	Lakshmipur-3	A. K. M. Shahjahan Kamal Died: 30 September 2023	Awami League
276	Lakshmipur-3	Golam Faruque Pinku By-election: 5 November 2023	Awami League
277	Lakshmipur-4	Abdul Mannan	Bikalpa Dhara Bangladesh
278	Chittagong-1	Engineer Mosharraf Hossain	Awami League
279	Chittagong-2	Syed Najibul Bashar Maizbhandari	Bangladesh Tarikat Federation
280	Chittagong-3	Mahfuzur Rahaman	Awami League
281	Chittagong-4	Didarul Alam	Awami League
282	Chittagong-5	Anisul Islam Mahmud	Jatiya Party (Ershad)
283	Chittagong-6	A. B. M. Fazle Karim Chowdhury	Awami League
284	Chittagong-7	Hasan Mahmud	Awami League
285	Chittagong-8	Mayeen Uddin Khan Badal Died: 7 November 2019	Awami League
285	Chittagong-8	Moslem Uddin Ahmad By-election: 13 January 2020; Died: 6 February 2023	Awami League
285	Chittagong-8	Noman Al Mahmud By-election: 27 April 2023	Awami League
286	Chittagong-9	Mohibul Hasan Chowdhury	Awami League
287	Chittagong-10	Muhammad Afsarul Ameen Died: 2 June 2023	Awami League
287	Chittagong-10	Md Mohiuddin Bacchu By-election: 30 July 2023	Awami League
288	Chittagong-11	M. Abdul Latif	Awami League
289	Chittagong-12	Shamsul Haque Chowdhury	Awami League
290	Chittagong-13	Saifuzzaman Chowdhury	Awami League
291	Chittagong-14	Md. Nazrul Islam Chowdhury	Awami League
292	Chittagong-15	Abu Reza Muhammad Nezamuddin Nadwi	Awami League
293	Chittagong-16	Mustafizur Rahman Chowdhury	Awami League
294	Cox's Bazar-1	Jafar Alam	Awami League
295	Cox's Bazar-2	Asheq Ullah Rafiq	Awami League
296	Cox's Bazar-3	Saimum Sarwar Kamal	Awami League
297	Cox's Bazar-4	Shahin Akhtar Bodi	Awami League
298	Khagrachari	Kujendra Lal Tripura	Awami League
299	Rangamati	Dipankar Talukdar	Awami League
300	Bandarban	Bir Bahadur Ushwe Sing	Awami League

=== Members of Reserved Women's Seat ===
Women's Seat		Name	Political Party
301	Women's Seat-1	Sherin Ahmed	Awami League
302	Women's Seat-2	Jinnatul Bakia	Awami League
303	Women's Seat-3	Shabnam Jahan	Awami League
304	Women's Seat-4	Suborna Mustafa	Awami League
305	Women's Seat-5	Naheed Ezaher Khan	Awami League
306	Women's Seat-6	Khadizatul Anwar	Awami League
307	Women's Seat-7	Waseqa Ayesha Khan	Awami League
308	Women's Seat-8	Kaniz Fatema Ahmed	Awami League
309	Women's Seat-9	Basanti Chakma	Awami League
310	Women's Seat-10	Anjum Sultana Sima	Awami League
311	Women's Seat-11	Aroma Dutta	Awami League
312	Women's Seat-12	Sheuly Azad	Awami League
313	Women's Seat-13	Shamsun Nahar	Awami League
314	Women's Seat-14	Rumana Ali	Awami League
315	Women's Seat-15	Sultana Nadira	Awami League
316	Women's Seat-16	Hosne Ara	Awami League
317	Women's Seat-17	Habiba Rahman Khan	Awami League
318	Women's Seat-18	Zakia Parvin Khanam	Awami League
319	Women's Seat-19	Sheikh Anne Rahman Died: 11 October 2022	Awami League
319	Women's Seat-19	Dorothy Rahman By-election: 16 November 2022	Awami League
320	Women's Seat-20	Aparajita Haque	Awami League
321	Women's Seat-21	Shamima Akter Khanam	Awami League
322	Women's Seat-22	Fazilatun Nessa Indira	Awami League
323	Women's Seat-23	Rabeya Alim	Awami League
324	Women's Seat-24	Tamanna Nusrat Bubly	Awami League
325	Women's Seat-25	Nargis Rahman	Awami League
326	Women's Seat-26	Monira Sultana	Awami League
327	Women's Seat-27	Mst. Khaleda Khanum	Awami League
328	Women's Seat-28	Sayeda Rubina Akter	Awami League
329	Women's Seat-29	Kazi Kaniz Sultana	Awami League
330	Women's Seat-30	Gloria Jharna Sarker	Awami League
331	Women's Seat-31	Khandaker Momota Hena Lovely	Awami League
332	Women's Seat-32	Zakia Tabassum	Awami League
333	Women's Seat-33	Farida Khanam	Awami League
334	Women's Seat-34	Rushema Begum Died: 9 July 2019	Awami League
334	Women's Seat-34	Salma Chowdhury By-election: 4 August 2019	Awami League
335	Women's Seat-35	Sayeda Rashida Begum	Awami League
336	Women's Seat-36	Syeda Zohora Alauddin	Awami League
337	Women's Seat-37	Adiba Anjum Mita	Awami League
338	Women's Seat-38	Ferdosi Islam	Awami League
339	Women's Seat-39	Parveen Haque Sikder	Awami League
340	Women's Seat-40	Khodeza Nasreen Akhter Hossain	Awami League
341	Women's Seat-41	Mst. Tahmina Begum	Awami League
342	Women's Seat-42	Nadira Yeasmin Jolly	Awami League
343	Women's Seat-43	Ratna Ahmed	Awami League
344	Women's Seat-44	Salma Islam	Jatiya Party (Ershad)
345	Women's Seat-45	Masuda M Rashid Chowdhury Died: 13 September 2021	Jatiya Party (Ershad)
345	Women's Seat-45	Sharifa Quader By-election: 1 November 2021	Jatiya Party (Ershad)
346	Women's Seat-46	Nazma Akther	Jatiya Party (Ershad)
347	Women's Seat-47	Rowshan Ara Mannan	Jatiya Party (Ershad)
348	Women's Seat-48	Lutfun Nesa Khan	Workers Party of Bangladesh
349	Women's Seat-49	Selina Islam	Independent
350	Women's Seat-50	Rumeen Farhana Resigned: 11 December 2022	Bangladesh Nationalist Party
350	Women's Seat-50	Afroza Haque Rina By-election: 6 March 2023	Jatiya Samajtantrik Dal
