= Khanam =

Khanam is a surname. Notable people with the surname include:

- Ashrafi Khanam, Bangladeshi singer
- Husna Banu Khanam (1922–2006), Bangladeshi writer and singer
- K. J. Hamida Khanam (c. 1940–2015), Bangladeshi politician
- Kabita Khanam (born 1957), Bangladeshi jurist and Election Commissioner
- Karimunnesa Khanam Chaudhurani (1855–1926), Bengali poet and social worker
- Mahfuza Khanam (1946–2025), Bangladeshi academic and social activist
- Meherbanu Khanam (1885–1925), Bengali noblewoman and artist
- Sanjida Khanam (born 1963), Bangladeshi politician
- Sayeeda Khanam (1937–2020), Bangladeshi photographer
- Shakeela Khanam Rashid, Pakistani politician
- Shamima Akter Khanam, Bangladeshi politician
- Zakia Khanam (born 1971), Indian politician
- Zakia Parvin Khanam, Bangladeshi politician

== See also ==
- Char Khanam, a Bangladeshi village
- Khanom (disambiguation)
