= Aparajita Haque =

Bangladeshi politician

- অপরাজিতা হক

Member of the Bangladesh Parliament for Reserved Women's Seat-35
- In office 28 February 2024 – 6 August 2024
- Preceded by: Sayeda Rashida Begum

Member of the Bangladesh Parliament for Reserved Women's Seat-20
- In office 16 February 2019 – 29 January 2024
- Preceded by: Dilara Begum
- Succeeded by: Anima Mukti Gomez

Personal details
- Born: 14 June 1964 (age 62)
- Party: Bangladesh Awami League
- Parent: Khandaker Asaduzzaman (father)
- Education: M.Sc
- Occupation: Politician

Aparajita Haque (Bengali: অপরাজিতা হক, Bengali pronunciation: [ɔpɔradʒita ɦɔk]; born 14 June 1964) is a Bangladeshi politician who was elected as member of 11th Jatiya Sangsad to one of the seats reserved for women. She is a politician of the Bangladesh Awami League. Her father Khandaker Asaduzzaman was an MP from Tangail-2.
