= Khanom =

Khanom may refer to:

- Khanum, a female royal and aristocratic title
- Khanom (ขนม), is the Thai word which refer to dessert or snack. See Thai cuisine
- Khanom District, Thailand (ขนอม)
- Places in Iran (Persian: خانم):
  - Khanom Kan
  - Khanom Sheykhan
- Maryam Khanom (1770–1843), royal consort of Agha Mohammad Shah (r. 1789–1797), and then the royal consort of Agha Mohammad's nephew and successor Fath-Ali Shah Qajar (r. 1797–1834)

== See also ==
- Khanam, a surname
