= Abdul Matin Mia =

Bangladeshi politician

Member of Bangladesh Parliament
- In office 1988–1991
- Preceded by: Shamsul Haque Talukder
- Succeeded by: Abdus Salam Pintu

Personal details
- Died: 5 May 2017
- Party: Jatiya Party (Ershad)

Abdul Matin Mia was a Jatiya Party (Ershad) politician and member of parliament for Tangail-2.

== Career ==
Mia was elected to parliament from Tangail-2 as a Jatiya Party candidate in 1988. He died on 5 May 2017.
