= Shahida Tareque Dipti =

Bangladeshi politician

Member of the Bangladesh Parliament for Reserved women's seat-28
- In office 28 February 2024 – 6 August 2024
- Preceded by: Farida Khanam

Member of the Bangladesh Parliament for Reserved women's seat-29
- In office 19 March 2009 – 24 January 2014
- Preceded by: Hosne Ara Gias
- Succeeded by: Shamsun Nahar Begum

Personal details
- Born: 5 May 1966 (age 59)
- Party: Bangladesh Awami League

Shahida Tareque Dipti (born 5 May 1966) is a Bangladesh Awami League politician and a former member of parliament from a reserved seat.

== Career ==
Dipti was injured in the 2004 Dhaka grenade attack on a Bangladesh Awami League rally led by Sheikh Hasina. She was elected to parliament from a reserved seat as a Bangladesh Awami League candidate in 2009. She is the president of the Dhaka North unit of Bangladesh Mahila Awami League.
