= Begum Akhtar (disambiguation) =

Begum Akhtar (1914–1974) was an Indian ghazal singer.

Begum Akhtar may also refer to:

- Sardar Akhtar (1915–1984), also known as Begum Akhtar, Indian film actress best known for the 1940 film Aurat
- Begum Akhtar Sulaiman (1922–1982), Pakistani social worker, political activist and daughter of Huseyn Shaheed Suhraward
- Begum Akhtar Riazuddin (1928–2023), Pakistani activist and writer
- Begum Akhtar Jahan (born 1952), Bangladeshi politician
