= Farida Khanam =

Farida Khanam may refer to:

- Farida Khanum, Pakistani classical singer
- Farida Khanam (scholar), Indian Islamic scholar
- Farida Khanam (politician), Bangladeshi politician
