= Ashrafun Nesha =

Awami League Politician

- আশরাফুন নেছা

Member of the Bangladesh Parliament for Reserved women's seat-44
- In office 28 February 2024 – 6 August 2024
- Preceded by: Nargis Rahman

Personal details
- Born: 1 January 1973 (age 53)
- Party: Bangladesh Awami League

Ashrafun Nesha (born 1 January 1973) is a Awami League politician and a former Jatiya Sangsad member from a women's reserved for Laxmipur District.
