= Afazuddin Fakir =

Bangladeshi politician (born 1925)

- আফাজউদ্দিন ফকির

Member of the Bangladesh Parliament for Tangail-2
- In office 2 April 1979 – 24 March 1982
- Preceded by: Hatem Ali Talukdar
- Succeeded by: Shamsul Haque Talukder

Member of the 4th National Assembly of Pakistan for Mymensingh-II
- In office 1965–1969
- Preceded by: Ibrahim Khan
- Succeeded by: Karimuzzaman Talukder

Personal details
- Born: 1 February 1925 Mymensingh district, Bengal Province, British India
- Died: 2 February 2002 (aged 77)
- Party: Bangladesh Nationalist Party
- Parent: Mokbul Hossain Fakir (father)
- Relatives: Lokman Hossain Fakir (brother); Fakir Mahbub Anam Swapan (nephew)

Afazuddin Fakir (1 February 1925 – 2 February 2000) was a Bangladesh Nationalist Party politician. He was a Jatiya Sangsad member representing the Tangail-2 constituency during 1979–1982.

== Background ==
Afazuddin Fakir was born in 1925 at Nikrail in Bhuapur in the then Mymensingh District, Bengal Province, British India (now in Tangail District, Bangladesh). He graduated from Karatia College in 1945 and started a jute business in Narayanganj.

== Career ==
As an independent candidate he was elected a member of the National Assembly for constituency Mymensingh-II in 1965.

Fakir was a member of the national committee. He sent a letter to the president of Pakistan, Yahya Khan, asking him to deescalate the situation in East Pakistan on 13 March 1971 before the start of Bangladesh Liberation war. He was elected to the parliament from Tangail-2 as a Bangladesh Nationalist Party candidate in 1979.

Fakir was awarded Sitara-i-Quaid-i-Azam for his success in business by the government of Pakistan in 1968.
