= Fakir Mahbub Anam Swapan =

Bangladeshi politician

- ফকির মাহবুব আনাম স্বপন
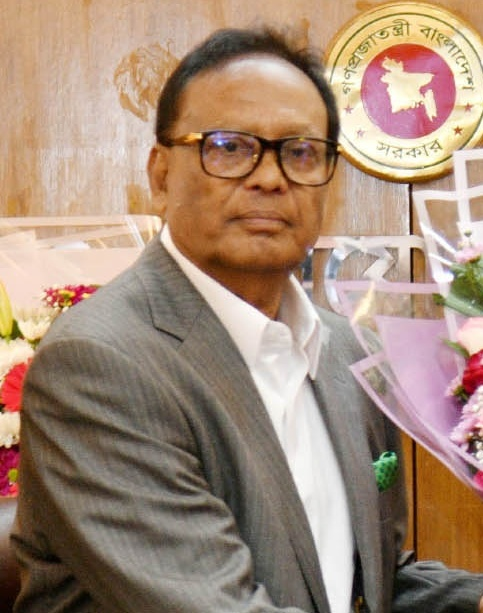
- Swapan in 2026

Minister of Posts, Telecommunications and Information Technology
- Incumbent
- Assumed office 17 February 2026
- Prime Minister: Tarique Rahman
- Preceded by: Muhammad Yunus

Minister of Science and Technology
- Incumbent
- Assumed office 17 February 2026
- Prime Minister: Tarique Rahman
- Preceded by: Salehuddin Ahmed

Member of Parliament
- Incumbent
- Assumed office 17 February 2026
- Preceded by: Mohammad Abdur Razzaque
- Constituency: Tangail-1

Personal details
- Born: 5 March 1953 (age 73) Mymensingh, East Bengal, Dominion of Pakistan
- Party: Bangladesh Nationalist Party
- Relatives: Afazuddin Fakir (uncle); Lokman Hossain Fakir (uncle)

Fakir Mahbub Anam Swapan (born 5 March 1953) is a Bangladesh Nationalist Party politician and businessman. He is the incumbent Jatiya Sangsad member representing the Tangail-1 constituency (Madhupur-Dhanbari) and the incumbent minister of posts, telecommunications, information technology, science and technology in the cabinet of Prime Minister Tarique Rahman since February 2026.

== Early life and education ==
Fakir Mahbub Anam was born to Mokbul Hossain Fakir in Bhuapur in the then Mymensingh District, East Bengal, Dominion of Pakistan (now in Tangail District, Bangladesh). His uncle, Afazuddin Fakir, was one of the founding members of Bangladesh Nationalist Party (BNP) and was a Jatiya Sangsad member representing the Tangail-2 constituency winning the 1979 election. Another uncle, Lokman Hossain Fakir, was a Ekushey Padak winning musician.

== Career ==
Swapan is a member of the central executive committee of BNP. He contested the 1996 parliamentary election from Tangail-2 as an independent candidate against the official BNP nominee but was defeated. In the 2001 Bangladeshi general election, he was nominated by the Bangladesh Nationalist Party (BNP) from Tangail-1; however, he lost by a large margin to the Awami League candidate Abdur Razzaq. In that election, a BNP rebel candidate reportedly secured more votes than him. In the 2008 Bangladeshi general election, Swapan again contested as a BNP candidate and was defeated by Razzaq again by a significant margin.

In the 13th Jatiya Sangsad election, held on 13 February 2026, the Bangladesh Nationalist Party (BNP) again nominated him from Tangail-1. He faced competition from Bangladesh Jamaat-e-Islami candidate Muhammad Abdullahahil Kafi and a BNP rebel candidate, Mohammad Ali. It was widely reported in local political circles that Mohammad Ali had greater popularity in Tangail-1. However, for the sake of party unity, Mohammad Ali withdrew his candidacy and extended full support to Fakir. As a result of Mohammad Ali’s withdrawal and support, Fakir ultimately secured victory, despite earlier expectations that he might not win. Swapan won the Tangail-1 seat with 153,932 votes, defeating his nearest rival, Bangladesh Jamaat-e-Islami candidate Muhammad Abdullahil Kafi, who received 94,462 votes. This victory marked the first time in 45 years that BNP reclaimed the seat. On 17 February, Swapan was sworn in as a full cabinet minister in the newly formed BNP-led government. He was assigned the portfolios of posts, telecommunications, information technology, science and technology.
