= Aroma Dutta =

Bangladeshi politician

- আরমা দত্ত
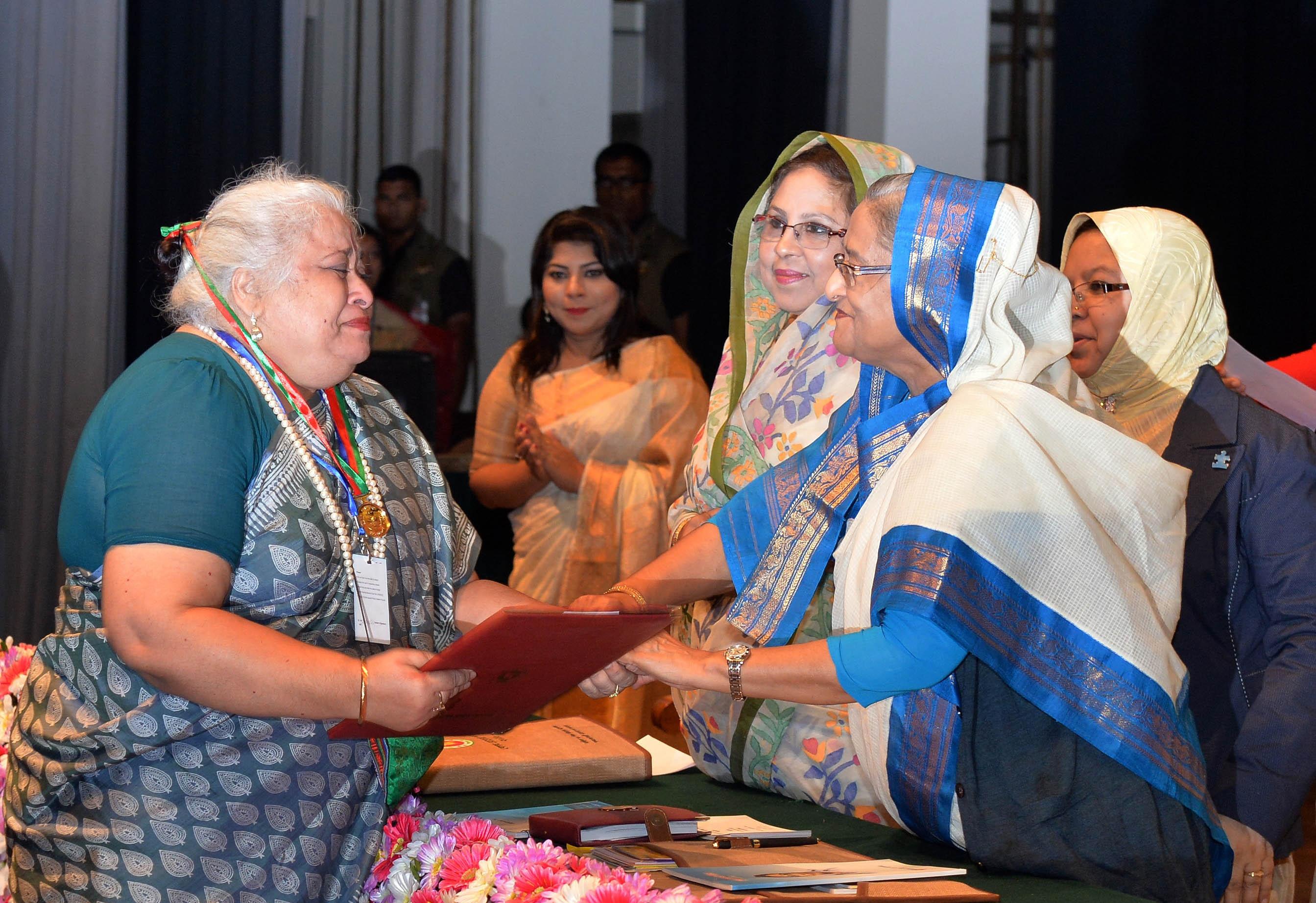
- Dutta receiving 2016 Begum Rokeya Padak

Member of the Bangladesh Parliament for Reserved Women's Seat-40
- In office 28 February 2024 – 6 August 2024
- Preceded by: Syeda Zohora Alauddin

Member of the Bangladesh Parliament for Reserved Women's Seat-11
- In office 20 February 2019 – 29 January 2024
- Preceded by: Happy Baral
- Succeeded by: Farida Yasmin

Personal details
- Born: 20 July 1950 (age 76)
- Relatives: Dhirendranath Datta (grandfather); Ritwik Kumar Ghatak (maternal Uncle)
- Education: MS, M.I.A, Nawab Faizunnesa Govt. Girls' High School, Cumilla.
- Occupation: Human rights activist

Aroma Dutta (born 20 July 1950) is a Bangladeshi social and human rights activist. In February 2019, she was nominated by the ruling party, the Bangladesh Awami League, to a seat reserved for women in the 11th parliament of Jatiya Sangsad.

== Early life ==
Dutta's grandfather, Dhirendranath Datta, was a member of the National Assembly of Pakistan and the first person to demand that Bengali be made a state language in Pakistan. He was killed during the Bangladesh Liberation war by members of the Pakistan army and is considered a martyr in Bangladesh. Aroma's father, Sanjib Datta, was a journalist who worked for the Pakistan Observer. Her ancestral home in Brahmanbaria was taken over by Muslims after the Bangladesh Liberation war through the use of the vested property act. She has tried to reclaim it through the local courts but has been unsuccessful. Dutta served in the National Human Rights Commission of Bangladesh. Her maternal Uncle was the filmmaker Ritwik Kumar Ghatak. Aroma was a student of Nawab Faizunnesa Govt. Girls' High School, Cumilla.

== Career ==
Dutta is the executive director of the PRIP (Private Rural Initiatives Program) Trust. In 2012, she criticised the draft Hindu Marriage Registration Act for making the registration of Hindu marriages optional and called for it to be made mandatory. She has protested violence against minorities in Bangladesh and has demanded punishment for those involved in attacks against Buddhists in Cox's Bazar. Dutta has spoken against the vested property act, that unfairly targets religious minorities. She has stated that the only way to protect minorities in Bangladesh is through the proper implementation of laws in the country.

Dutta has called for security forces to be deployed in vulnerable election areas for elections to take place. She has called on the government to provide social security to Dalits, low caste Hindus, and other marginalised communities at a roundtable discussion in Dhaka.

On 7 November 2026, National Citizen Party leaders removed a signboard identifying Aroma Dutta, as the property's lawful heir of Dhirendranath Datta's property in Comilla, arguing that the historic house should be preserved by the state as a memorial museum rather than sold privately. Dutta condemned the action and said she would inform the authorities. She called the National Citizen Party leaders land grabbers. Dutta issued a legal notice challenging the Department of Archaeology's order to inspect her family's ancestral property in Cumilla for possible recognition as an antiquity.

== Awards ==
In 2016, Dutta was awarded the Begum Rokeya Padak by the government of Bangladesh. In May 2017, she received the Danbir Ranada Prasad Memorial Honour and Gold Medal by the Kumudini Welfare Trust of Bengal, on behalf of her father.
