= Shabnam Jahan =

Bangladeshi politician

Shabnan Jahan
- শবনম জাহাঁ

Member of the Bangladesh Parliament for Reserved Women's Seat-24
- In office 28 February 2024 – 6 August 2024
- Preceded by: Zakia Tabassum

Member of the Bangladesh Parliament for Reserved Women's Seat-3
- In office 20 February 2019 – 29 January 2024
- Preceded by: Hosne Ara Lutfa Dalia
- Succeeded by: Ashika Sultana

Personal details
- Born: 14 August 1962 (age 63)
- Party: Bangladesh Awami League
- Education: M.A
- Occupation: Politician, businessperson

Shabnam Jahan (Bengali: শবনম জাহাঁ, Bengali pronunciation: [ʃɔbnɔm dʒaɦã]; born 14 August 1962) is a Bangladeshi politician who is former member of the 11th Jatiya Sangsad, filling a seat reserved for women. She is a politician of Bangladesh Awami League. She is the incumbent general secretary of Bangladesh Mahila Awami League.
