= Lokman Hossain Fakir =

Bangladeshi musician and lyricist (1934–1991)

- লোকমান হোসেন ফকির
- Born: 27 December 1934; Tangail District, Bengal Presidency, British India
- Died: 23 April 1991 (aged 56)
- Occupation: Music director
- Relatives: Afazuddin Fakir (uncle); Fakir Mahbub Anam Swapan (nephew)

Lokman Hossain Fakir (27 Dec 1934 – 23 April 1991) was a Bangladeshi musician. The government of Bangladesh awarded him the first Bangladesh National Film Award for Best Music Director in 1975 for Choritrohin (1975) jointly with Debu Bhattacherjee. He was also awarded the Ekushey Padak in 2003 posthumously for his contribution to music.

== Career ==
Fakir joined Bangladesh Betar in 1960 as an artist.
