= Nizamul Islam =

Bangladeshi politician and former member of parliament

Sheikh Nizamul Islam
- শেখ নিজামুল ইসলাম

Member of the Bangladesh Parliament for Tangail-1
- In office 7 May 1986 – 3 March 1988
- Preceded by: Syeda Ashiqua Akbar
- Succeeded by: Khandaker Anwarul Haque

Personal details
- Political party: Awami League
- Occupation: Physician and politician

Sheikh Nizamul Islam is a Bangladeshi politician and a former Jatiya Sangsad member. He was elected from Tangail-1 (Madhupur and Dhanbari) constituency as an Awami League candidate in the third Bangladeshi parliamentary election held on 7 May 1986.

Nizam was also elected a member of the Provincial Assembly of East Pakistan from Tangail-1 in the 1970 Pakistani general election. During the Liberation War of Bangladesh in 1971, he played an important role in forming foreign public opinion in favor of Provisional Government of Bangladesh.

== Early life ==
Nizam was born in Barnichanda Bari village of Tangail subdivision, East Pakistan (now Dhanbari Upazila, Tangail District, Bangladesh). He served as president of the Madhupur thana Awami League Branch.
