= Farida Khanam (politician) =

Bangladeshi politician

- ফরিদা খানম

Member of the Bangladesh Parliament for Reserved women's seat-42
- In office 28 February 2024 – 6 August 2024
- Preceded by: Adiba Anjum Mita

Member of the Bangladesh Parliament for Reserved women's seat-33
- In office 30 January 2019 – 29 January 2024
- Preceded by: Firoja Begum Chino
- Succeeded by: Shahida Tareque Dipti

Personal details
- Born: 18 September 1949 (age 76)
- Party: Bangladesh Awami League
- Spouse: Mahmudur Rahman Belayet

Farida Khanam (born 18 September 1949) is a Awami League politician and a former Jatiya Sangsad member representing a women's reserved seat selected in 2019 and 2024.
