= Shamsun Nahar Begum =

Bangladeshi politician

- শামছুন নাহার বেগম

Member of 10th Jatiya Sangsad
- In office 10 April 2014 – 30 December 2018
- Preceded by: Shahida Tareque Dipti
- Succeeded by: Kazi Kaniz Sultana
- Constituency: Reserved Women's Seat-29

Personal details
- Born: Ujanigaon, Sunamganj District
- Party: Awami League
- Occupation: Lawyer

Shamsun Nahar Begum (Bengali: শামছুন নাহার বেগম) is a lawyer and Bangladesh Awami League politician who was a member of parliament from a reserved seat from 2014 to 2018.

== Early life and education ==
Begum was born into a Bengali Muslim family in the village of Ujanigaon in Sunamganj. She completed her education until university, becoming a Bachelor of Arts and a Bachelor of Laws.

== Career ==
After completing her education, Begum became a qualified lawyer. She participated in the 2014 Bangladeshi general elections as an Awami League candidate and successfully won a reserved seat in the 10th Jatiya Sangsad.
