= Sadhana Halder =

Bangladeshi politician

Member of Bangladesh Parliament
- In office 2009–2014
- Succeeded by: Jahan Ara Begum Surma

Personal details
- Political party: Bangladesh Awami League

Sadhana Halder is a Bangladesh Awami League politician and a former member of the Bangladesh Parliament from a reserved seat.

== Career ==
Halder was elected to parliament from a reserved seat as a Bangladesh Awami League candidate in 2009.
