= Masuda Siddique Roji =

Bangladeshi politician

- মাসুদা সিদ্দীক রোজী

Member of the Bangladesh Parliament for Reserved women's seat-34
- In office 28 February 2024 – 6 August 2024
- Preceded by: Fazilatun Nessa Indira

Personal details
- Born: 17 June 1966 (age 59)
- Party: Bangladesh Awami League

Masuda Siddique Roji (born 17 June 1966) is a Awami League politician and a former Jatiya Sangsad member from a women's reserved for Narsingdi District. She is the managing director of Rasa Construction and Development Limited. She is a director of Real Estate and Housing Association of Bangladesh.
