= Khandaker Asaduzzaman =

Bangladeshi politician (1935–2020)

Member of Parliament from Tangail-2
- In office June 1996 – 2001
- Preceded by: Abdus Salam Pintu
- Succeeded by: Abdus Salam Pintu
- In office 2008–2018
- Preceded by: Abdus Salam Pintu
- Succeeded by: Soto Monir

Personal details
- Born: 22 October 1935 Tangail District
- Died: 25 April 2020 (aged 84)
- Party: Bangladesh Awami League
- Children: Aparajita Haque

Khandaker Asaduzzaman (22 October 1935 – 25 April 2020) (Bengali: খন্দকার আসাদুজ্জামান) was a Bangladeshi Civil Servant and is known as the First Finance Secretary of Independent Bangladesh in the Mujibnagar Government.

== Early life ==
Asaduzzaman was born on 22 October 1935. He had a B.A. Honors and a M.A. degree.

== Career ==
Asaduzzaman was a veteran of Bangladesh Liberation War. Khandaker Asaduzzaman was the first Finance Secretary of the Mujibnagar Government (Independent Bangladesh). He was elected Member of Parliament from Tangail-2 as an Awami League candidate. He was elected as a Member of Parliament 3 times; in 1996, 2008 and 2014 as a Bangladesh Awami League candidate from Tangail-2. He was the President of Bangabandhu Shishu Kishore Parishad.

Asaduzzaman has held various positions in the government from being appointed the Advisor to the Prime Minister Sheikh Hasina to holding the positions of Chairman of Bangladesh Muktijoddha Parishad, Bangabandhu Shishu Kishore Parishad, and the Chairman of the Establishment Ministry.

Asaduzzaman was also elected president of Dhaka Club Limited for two consecutive years.

== Death ==
Asaduzzaman died on 25 April 2020.
