= Minister of Posts, Telecommunications and Information Technology =

Cabinet position in Bangladesh

People's Republic of Bangladesh Minister of Posts, Telecommunications and Information Technology
- ডাক, টেলিযোগাযোগ ও তথ্য প্রযুক্তি বিষয়ক মন্ত্রী
- Government Seal of Bangladesh

- Flag of Bangladesh

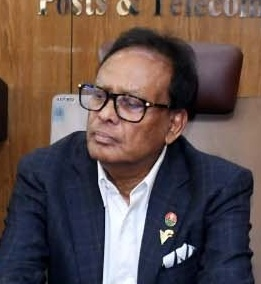
- Incumbent; Fakir Mahbub Anam Swapan since 17 February 2026
- Ministry of Posts, Telecommunications and Information Technology
- Style: The Honourable (formal); His Excellency (diplomatic)
- Type: Cabinet minister
- Status: Minister
- Member of: Cabinet
- Reports to: Prime Minister
- Seat: Bangladesh Secretariat
- Nominator: Prime Minister of Bangladesh
- Appointer: President of Bangladesh; on the advice of the Prime Minister
- Term length: the Prime Minister 's pleasure
- Formation: 10 February 2014; 12 years ago
- Salary: ৳245000 (US$2,000) per month (incl. allowances)
- Website: www.ptd.gov.bd www.ictd.gov.bd

The Minister of Posts, Telecommunications and Information Technology of Bangladesh serves as the head of the Ministry of Posts, Telecommunications and Information Technology within the government of Bangladesh. He is also the minister of all departments and agencies under the Posts, Telecommunications and Information Technology.

== History ==
Following the 2001 general election, the Ministry of Science and Technology (Bangladesh) was renamed on 18 September 2002 to become the Ministry of Science and Information & Communication Technology. To give more thrust for ICT sector the Information & Communication Technology Division was separated from Science and Technology ministry and it has upgraded as Ministry of Information & Communication Technology on 4 December 2011. The change is the evidence of understanding of the importance of ICT from the highest policy level and also an indication that the government is keen to keep pace with modern changing world. After 2014 election Ministry of Posts and Telecommunications and Ministry of ICT are integrated to Ministry of Posts, Telecommunications and Information Technology.

== List of ministers, advisers and state ministers ==
Parties

No party Bangladesh Nationalist Party Bangladesh Awami League Jatiya Party

No.	Portrait	Name	Took office	Left office	Head of government
		Muhammad Mansur Ali	10 April 1971	13 April 1972	Sheikh Mujibur Rahman
		Mollah Jalaluddin Ahmed	13 April 1972	16 March 1973	Sheikh Mujibur Rahman
		M. A. G. Osmani	16 March 1973	7 April 1974	Sheikh Mujibur Rahman
		KM Obaidur Rahman	8 April 1974	26 January 1975	Sheikh Mujibur Rahman
		Muhammad Mansur Ali	26 January 1975	15 August 1975	Sheikh Mujibur Rahman
		KM Obaidur Rahman	20 August 1975	5 November 1975	Khondaker Mostaq Ahmad
		Muhammad Ghulam Tawab	10 November 1975	4 December 1975	Abu Sadat Mohammad Sayem
		Moudud Ahmed	30 February 1977	29 June 1978	Ziaur Rahman
		Moudud Ahmed	4 July 1978	15 April 1979	Ziaur Rahman
		AKM Maidul Islam	15 April 1979	5 March 1982	Ziaur Rahman; Abdus Sattar
		Sultan Ahmed (deputy speaker)	5 March 1982	24 March 1982	Abdus Sattar
		Mahbub Ali Khan	10 July 1982	1 June 1984	A. F. M. Ahsanuddin Chowdhury; Hussain Muhammad Ershad
		Sultan Ahmed	16 January 1985	25 May 1986	Hussain Muhammad Ershad
		Mizanur Rahman Chowdhury	25 May 1986	27 March 1988	Hussain Muhammad Ershad
		Iqbal Hossain Chowdhury	27 March 1988	10 December 1988	Hussain Muhammad Ershad
		Kazi Firoz Rashid	15 December 1988	6 December 1990	Hussain Muhammad Ershad
		Shamsul Islam	20 March 1991	19 September 1991	Khaleda Zia
		Mohammad Keramat Ali	19 September 1991	14 August 1993	Khaleda Zia
		Tariqul Islam	14 August 1993	30 March 1996	Khaleda Zia
		Syed Manzur Elahi	3 April 1996	23 June 1996	Habibur Rahman
		Mohammed Nasim	23 June 1996	11 March 1999	Sheikh Hasina
		Abdur Rauf Chowdhury	29 December 1999	15 July 2001	Sheikh Hasina
		Moinul Hossain Chowdhury	26 July 2001	10 October 2001	Latifur Rahman
		Aminul Haque	10 October 2001	31 October 2006	Khaleda Zia
		Akbar Ali Khan	1 November 2006	12 December 2006	Iajuddin Ahmed
		Shoeb Ahmed	12 December 2006	11 January 2007	Iajuddin Ahmed
		A. B. Mirza Azizul Islam	14 January 2007	6 January 2009	Fakhruddin Ahmed
		Rajiuddin Ahmed Raju	6 January 2009	15 September 2012	Sheikh Hasina
		Sahara Khatun	15 September 2012	21 November 2013	Sheikh Hasina
		Rashed Khan Menon	21 November 2013	12 January 2014	Sheikh Hasina
		Abdul Latif Siddiqui	12 January 2014	11 February 2014	Sheikh Hasina
		Tarana Halim	14 July 2015	3 January 2018	Sheikh Hasina
		Sheikh Hasina	13 October 2014	2 January 2018	Sheikh Hasina
		Mustafa Jabbar	3 January 2018	29 November 2023	Sheikh Hasina
		Zunaid Ahmed Palak	29 November 2023	6 August 2024	Sheikh Hasina
		Nahid Islam	9 August 2024	25 February 2025	Muhammad Yunus
		Muhammad Yunus	25 February 2025	17 February 2026	Muhammad Yunus
		Fakir Mahbub Anam Swapan	17 February 2026	Incumbent	Tarique Rahman
