= Enayet Hossain Khan =

Bangladeshi politician

Member of Bangladesh Parliament
- In office 1973–1976

Personal details
- Political party: Awami League

Enayet Hossain Khan (Bengali: এনায়েত হোসেন খান; 1933–1979) was an Awami League politician in Bangladesh and a former member of parliament for Bakerganj-16.

== Career ==
Khan was elected to parliament from Bakerganj-16 as an Awami League candidate in 1973.

== Personal life ==
Khan's daughter, Sheikh Anne Rahman, also became a member of parliament from Awami League at 11th Jatiya Sangsad.
