= Firoja Begum Chino =

Bangladeshi politician

Member of Bangladesh Parliament
- In office 10 April 2014 – 30 December 2018

Personal details
- Party: Awami League

Firoja Begum Chino (Bengali: ফিরোজা বেগম) was an Awami League politician and a former member of the Bangladesh Parliament from a reserved seat.

== Early life ==
Chino was born on 23 February 1961. She has a Secondary School Certificate.

== Career ==
Chino was elected to parliament from a reserved seat as a Bangladesh Awami League candidate in 2014. She is the president of the Rangamati District unit of the Bangladesh Mohila Awami League.

Chino's daughter, Naznin Anwar, sued journalists under the Digital Security Act after they reported alcohol was being sold illegally at her restaurant at the Rangamati DC Park.
