= Jahan Ara Begum Surma =

Bangladeshi politician

- জাহান আরা বেগম সুরমা

Member of Parliament from Women's Reserved Seat-32
- In office 10 April 2014 – 30 December 2018
- Preceded by: Sadhana Halder
- Succeeded by: Zakia Tabassum

Personal details
- Born: 27 February 1958 (age 67)
- Political party: Bangladesh Awami League

Jahan Ara Begum Surma (born 27 February 1958) is a Bangladesh Awami League politician and a former Jatiya Sangsad member from the Women's Reserved Seat-32.

== Early life ==
Surma was born on 27 February 1958 and she has a H.S.C. degree.
