= Naheed Ezaher Khan =

Bangladeshi politician

- নাহিদ ইজাহার খান
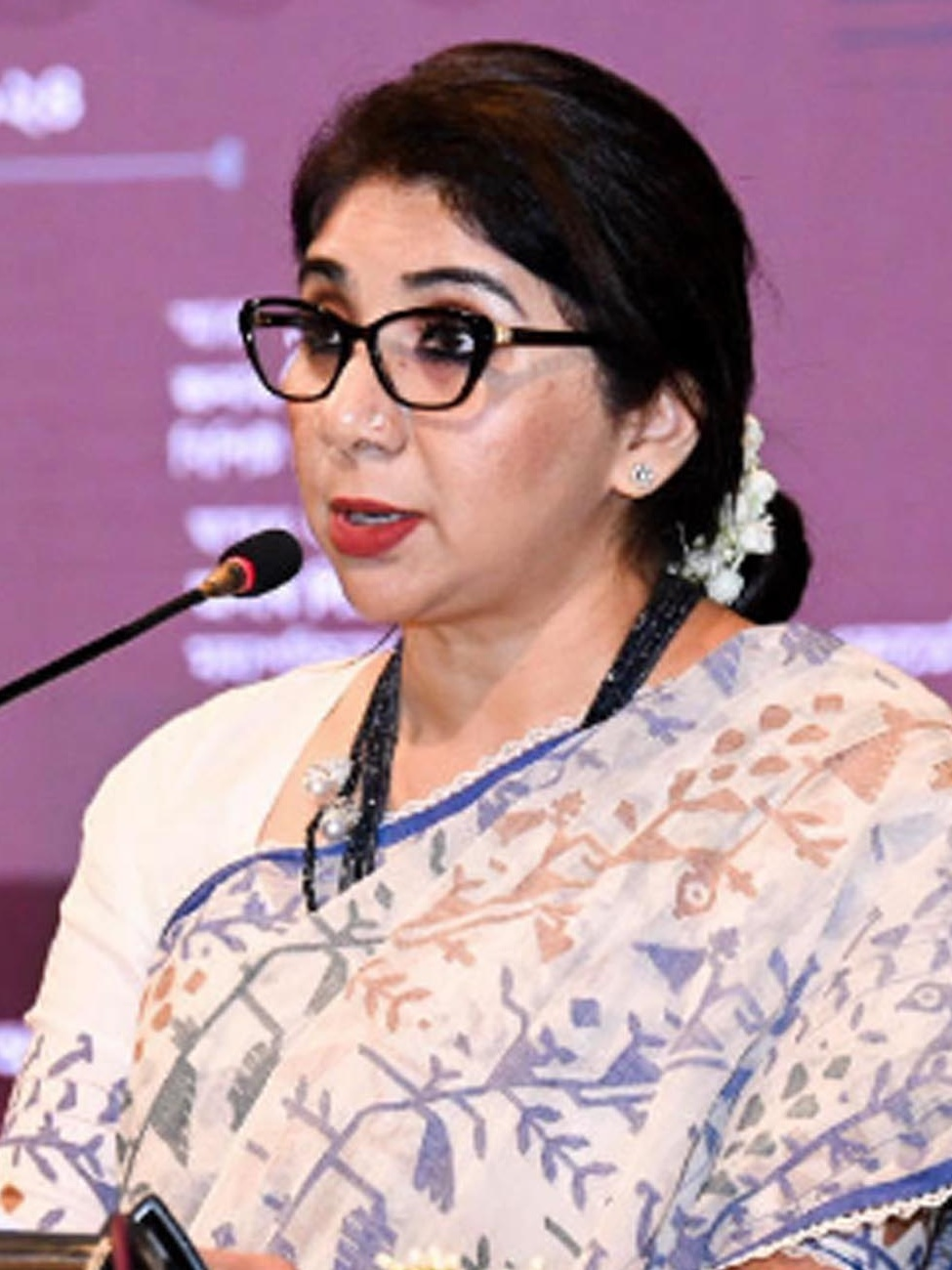
- Khan at Shilpakala Academy, Dhaka (2024)

Minister of State for Cultural Affairs
- In office 1 March 2024 – 6 August 2024
- Prime Minister: Sheikh Hasina
- Preceded by: K. M. Khalid
- Succeeded by: Asif Nazrul

Member of the Bangladesh Parliament for Reserved women's seat–27
- In office 28 February 2024 – 6 August 2024
- Preceded by: Ferdosi Islam
- Succeeded by: Jahrat Adib Chowdhury

Member of the Bangladesh Parliament for Reserved women's seat-5
- In office 30 January 2019 – 29 January 2024
- Preceded by: Begum Akhtar Jahan
- Succeeded by: Zara Jabeen Mahbub

Personal details
- Born: 30 August 1972 (age 53)
- Party: Bangladesh Awami League
- Parent: Khondkar Nazmul Huda (father)

Naheed Ezaher Khan (born 30 August 1972) is a Bangladesh Awami League politician and a former state minister of cultural affairs . She is a former Jatiya Sangsad member representing a women's reserved seat.

== Early life ==
Naheed Ezaher Huda was born on 30 August 1972 in Dacca, Bangladesh. She belongs to a Bengali family of Khondkars originally from the village of Kodalia in Nagarkanda, Faridpur District. She is the daughter of Colonel Huda.

== Career ==
Khan was elected to parliament on a seat reserved for women as a Bangladesh Awami League candidate in February 2019. She is a member of the parliamentary caucus on child rights.
