= Ashika Sultana =

Bangladesh Awami League politician

- আশিকা সুলতানা

Member of the Bangladesh Parliament for Reserved Women's Seat-3
- In office 28 February 2024 – 6 August 2024
- Preceded by: Shabnam Jahan

Personal details
- Born: 25 July 1980 (age 45) Nilphamari, Rangpur, Bangladesh
- Party: Awami League

Ashika Sultana (born 25 July 1980) is a Bangladesh Awami League politician from Nilphamari and a former Jatiya Sangsad member from the women reserved seat in 2024.

== Early life ==
Sultana was born to Md. Azaharul Islam who is a former member of Jatiya Sangsad from Nilphamari-3.

== Career ==
Sultana was elected to the Jatiya Sangsad member from the women reserved seat in 2024 as a candidate of the Awami League.

In June 2026, Sultana was arrested in connection with a case filed under the Anti-Terrorism Act, 2009 over an alleged Awami League procession in Mirpur, Dhaka. She was subsequently placed on multiple remand orders for police interrogation. She denied wrongdoing and questioning the repeated remands.
