= Md Mainul Hossain Khan Nikhil =

Bangladesh politician

Md. Mainul Hossain Khan Nikhil
- মো. মাঈনুল হোসেন খান নিখিল
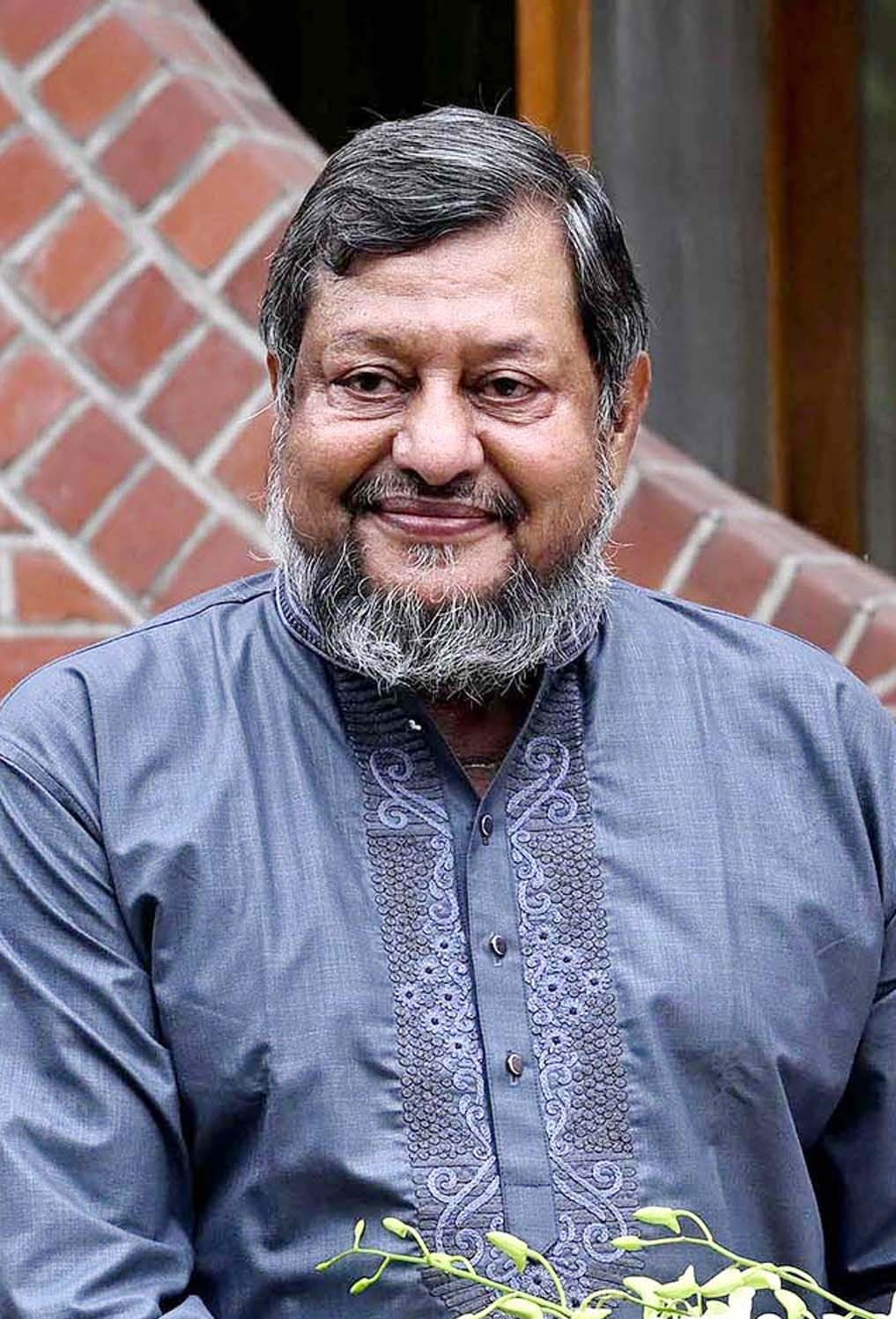
- Mainul in 2024

Member of the Bangladesh Parliament for Dhaka-14
- In office 30 January 2024 – 6 August 2024
- Preceded by: Aga Khan Mintu
- Succeeded by: Mir Ahmad Bin Quasem

Personal details
- Born: 27 June 1964 (age 62) Dhaka, Bangladesh
- Party: Bangladesh Awami League
- Occupation: Politician

Mainul Hossain Khan Nikhil (born 27 June 1964) is a Bangladesh Awami League politician and a former Jatiya Sangsad member representing the Dhaka-14 constituency. He is serving as general secretary of the Bangladesh Awami Jubo league.

== Career ==
Mainul Hossain Khan Nikhil is the general secretary of the Bangladesh Awami Jubo League, the youth wing of the political party Bangladesh Awami League. He was nominated by the Awami League as a candidate for the Dhaka-14 constituency in the 12th parliament election. On 7 January 2024, he was elected member of parliament for the Dhaka-14 constituency.

In September 2026, International Crimes Tribunal-2, headed by Justice Md Nazrul Islam Chowdhury, sentenced Nikhil to death. In November, his house in Mirpur, Dhaka was vandalized and set on fire by the activists of the Bangladesh Jatiotabadi Chhatra Dal.
