= Khandaker Anwarul Haque =

Bangladeshi politician

Member of the Bangladesh Parliament for Tangail-1
- In office 3 March 1988 – 6 December 1990
- Preceded by: Nizamul Islam
- Succeeded by: Abul Hasan Chowdhury

Personal details
- Political party: Bangladesh Nationalist Party

Khandaker Anwarul Haque is a Bangladeshi politician and former member of parliament.

== Early life ==
Anwarul Haque was born in Jatabari village of Madhupur Upazila of Tangail district to Khandaker Azizur Rahman and Khadija Begum. He obtained a post-graduate degree from the University of Dhaka.

== Career ==
While studying at the University of Dhaka, Haque joined the student politics. He was a member of the Dhaka University Central Student Parliament. He won the fourth parliamentary election in 1988 from Tangail-1 constituency as an independent politician. After being elected a member of parliament, he joined the Jatiya Party (Ershad). After joining the Jatiya Party for some time, he joined the BNP and at present, he is acting as advisor to the BNP's Madhupur Upazila branch.
