= Hatem Ali Talukdar =

Bangladeshi politician

Member of Bangladesh Parliament
- In office 1979–1973
- Preceded by: Office established
- Succeeded by: Afazuddin Fakir

Personal details
- Died: 24 October 1997
- Political party: Awami League

Hatem Ali Talukdar was a Bangladesh Awami League politician and a former member of parliament for Tangail-2.

== Career ==
Talukdar was a student leader in the 1940 of East Pakistan Chattra League in Jamalpur Sub-division. He helped Sheikh Mujibur Rahman and Maulana Abdul Hamid Khan Bhashani organize a conference of the League in Jamalpur.

Talukdar was elected to parliament from Tangail-2 as a Bangladesh Awami League candidate in 1973.

== Death ==
Ali died on 24 October 1997.
