= Ashrafunnesa Mosharraf =

Bangladeshi politician (died 2019)

- আশরাফুন্নেছা মোশাররফ

Member of Parliament for Reserved Women's Seat-5
- In office 25 January 2009 – 24 January 2014
- Succeeded by: Begum Akhtar Jahan

Personal details
- Died: 18 January 2019 (aged 74); Dhaka, Bangladesh
- Political party: Bangladesh Awami League

Ashrafunnesa Mosharraf (died 18 January 2019) was a Bangladesh Awami League politician who served as a Jatiya Sangsad member from a seat reserved for women and was the president of the Bangladesh Mohila Awami League.

== Career ==
Mosharraf fought in the Bangladesh Liberation war. She was elected to parliament from a women's reserved seat in 2009. She became the president of the Mohila Awami League on 12 July 2003.

== Death ==
Mosharraf died on 18 January 2019 in Square Hospital, Dhaka, Bangladesh.
