= Sheikh Anne Rahman =

Bangladeshi politician (1960–2022)

- শেখ এ্যানী রহমান

Member of 11th Jatiya Sangsad of Reserved Seats for Women Seat-19
- In office 16 February 2019 – 11 October 2022
- Preceded by: Fatema Zohora Rani
- Succeeded by: Dorothy Rahman

Personal details
- Born: 28 September 1960 Swarupkathi, Pirojpur District, East Pakistan, Pakistan
- Died: 11 October 2022 (aged 62) Bangkok, Thailand
- Party: Bangladesh Awami League
- Parent: Enayet Hossain Khan (father)

Sheikh Anne Rahman (28 September 1960 – 11 October 2022) was a Bangladesh Awami League politician who was a Jatiya Sangsad member for the reserved women's seat-19. She was related to Prime Minister Sheikh Hasina.

== Career ==
Rahman was selected to parliament from the Pirojpur reserved seat as a Bangladesh Awami League candidate on 16 February 2019.

== Personal life ==
Rahman was married to Sheikh Hafizur Rahman, cousin of Sheikh Mujibur Rahman, the first president of Bangladesh. Her father, Enayet Hossain Khan, was an Awami League politician and the former Jatiya Sangsad member of Bakerganj-16 (now defunct).

She was reportedly related to singer Pritom Hasan.
