= Abdus Sattar (Tangail politician) =

Bangladeshi politician

- মোহাম্মদ আবদুস সাত্তার

Member of Parliament for Tangail-1
- In office 7 March 1973 – 18 February 1979

Personal details
- Born: Tangail District
- Political party: Jatiya Samajtantrik Dal (JASAD)
- Occupation: Politician

Abdus Sattar is a Bangladeshi politician and former member of parliament. He was elected from the Tangail-1 (Madhupur and Dhanbari) constituency as a Jatiya Samajtantrik Dal candidate in the first Bangladeshi parliamentary election, held on 7 March 1973.

In the election, he defeated Bangladesh Awami League candidate Mahendra Lal Barman by a margin of 5,000 votes.
