= Dilara Begum =

Bangladeshi politician

Member of Bangladesh Parliament
- In office 10 April 2014 – 30 December 2018

Personal details
- Party: Bangladesh Awami League

Dilara Begum (Bengali: দিলারা বেগম) is a Bangladesh Awami League politician and a former member of the Bangladesh Parliament from a reserved seat.

== Early life ==
Begum was born on 7 January 1954. She has a B.A. and B.Ed. degrees.

== Career ==
Begum was elected to parliament from a reserved seat as a Bangladesh Awami League candidate in 2014. In December 2019, her term in parliament having ended, she was elected president of the Kishoreganj District branch of the Bangladesh Mohila Awami League. She sought to regain her reserved seat in parliament in the 2024 Bangladeshi general election, but was unsuccessful.
