= Fazilatun Nessa Indira =

Bangladeshi politician

- ফজিলাতুন নেসা
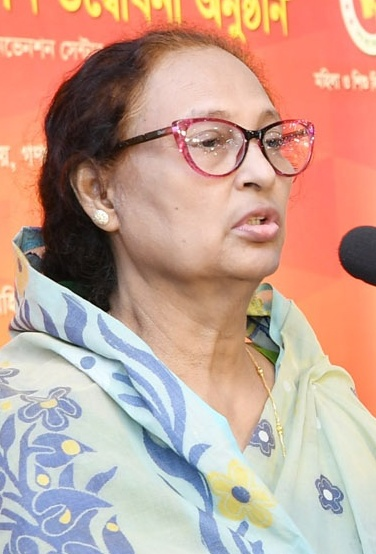
- Indira in 2022

Minister of State for Women and Children Affairs
- In office 13 July 2019 – 10 January 2024
- Prime Minister: Sheikh Hasina
- Preceded by: Meher Afroz Chumki
- Succeeded by: Simeen Hussain Rimi

Member of Bangladesh Parliament
- In office 28 February 2024 – 6 August 2024
- Preceded by: Ratna Ahmed
- Constituency: Reserved women's seat-23
- In office 29 January 2014 – 29 January 2024
- Preceded by: Mahfuza Rahman Rina
- Succeeded by: Masuda Siddique Roji
- Constituency: Reserved women's seat-22
- In office 9 December 2011 – 24 January 2014
- Preceded by: Position created
- Succeeded by: Merina Rahman
- Constituency: Reserved Women's Seat-46

Personal details
- Born: 1 January 1956 (age 70)
- Party: Bangladesh Awami League

Fazilatun Nessa Indira (born 1 January 1956) is a Bangladesh Awami League politician and a former State Minister of Women and Children Affairs. She was selected as a member of parliament from the reserved seats for women consecutively in the 9th, 10th, 11th and 12th parliamentary elections.

== Career ==
Indira was elected as the general secretary of Mohila Awami League through council election of 2003. She was elected as the women affairs secretary of Bangladesh Awami League in the triennial council in October 2016.
