= Mir Ahmad Bin Quasem =

Bangladeshi barrister and activist

- মীর আহমাদ বিন কাসেম আরমান
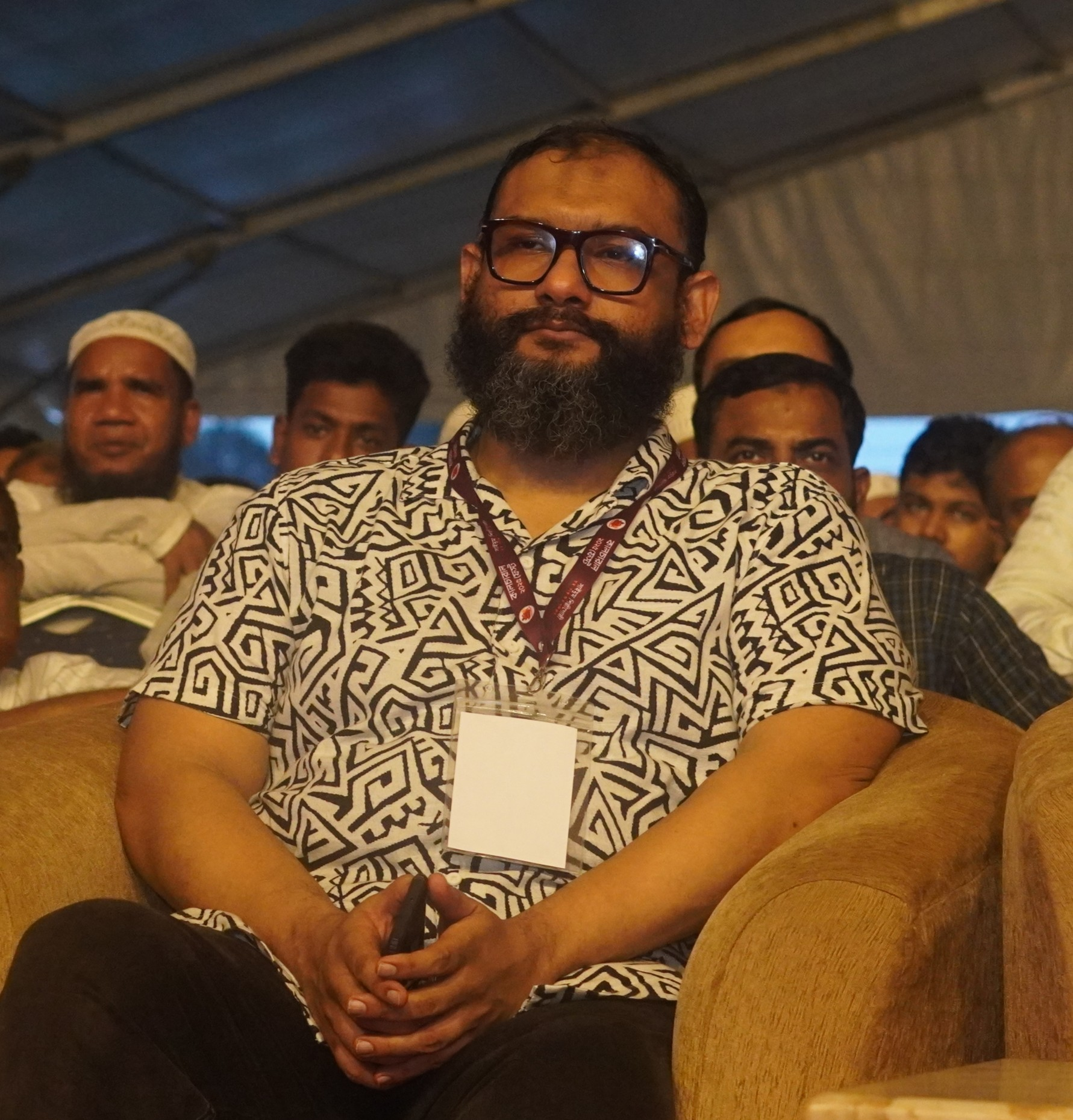
- Quasem in 2025

Member of Parliament
- Incumbent
- Assumed office 17 February 2026
- Preceded by: Md Mainul Hossain Khan Nikhil
- Constituency: Dhaka-14

Personal details
- Born: 18 March 1984 (age 42) Mirpur, Dhaka
- Party: Bangladesh Jamaat-e-Islami
- Spouse: Tahmina Akther
- Parent: Mir Quasem Ali (father)
- Education: University of London
- Occupation: Barrister; human rights activist
- Known for: Victim of Enforced Disappearance (between 2016–2024)
- Nickname: Arman

Mir Ahmad Bin Quasem also known as Barrister Arman, is a Bangladeshi barrister, politician, Human Rights activist, Member of Parliament and a Foreign Affairs adviser. A victim of enforced disappearance, Bin Quasem was abducted by security forces of the government of Bangladesh. He is the son of Mir Quasem Ali, a prominent leader of the Bangladesh Jamaat-e-Islami party. He left United Kingdom and returned to Bangladesh to join his father's Legal Defense Team before his abduction.

According to a whistleblower report, it was believed that Quasem was detained at a Bangladeshi secret detention center known as Aynaghar. He was released on August 6, 2024, in Dhaka. Pictures after his release showed that he had lost considerable weight.

== Education and career ==
Quasem completed his Bar Vocational Course (BVC) from Inns of Court School of Law (ICSL) and was called to the Bar of England and Wales, becoming Barrister. He had completed his L.L.B (Hons.) from the University of London.

At the time of his abduction in 2016, Quasem was representing his father Mir Quasem Ali as part of the latter's defence team in the International Crimes Tribunal (ICT) of Bangladesh set up in 2010.

== Abduction ==
Quasem was reportedly snatched from in front of his family members at his house in Mirpur, Dhaka during the night on 9 August 2016. According to a statement by Quasem's lawyers on the occasion of the third anniversary of his abduction, a group of 8 or 9 men entered Quasem's apartment at 11 pm on 9 August 2016 and demanded his whereabouts from his family. Mir Ahmad then went to the door, when he was told that he had to come with them. He was given 5 minutes with his family after which the men stormed into the apartment, and Quasem was pulled and grabbed away from his family, and dragged down the stairs and out of the house. He was then placed in a mini-bus which was driven away. According to the statement by the lawyers, "this abduction followed the exact modus operandi of other abductions by the security forces in Bangladesh." The same statement states that Mir Ahmad had been previously visited and questioned by several members of Rapid Action Battalion earlier on 5 August 2016.

=== Release ===
Quasem was released on 6 August 2024, the very next day after Sheikh Hasina resigned and fled Bangladesh following popular protests. Pictures shared on social media by family members showed him embracing his mother and two daughters. Two lawyers, Michael Polak and Toby Cadman, who had long advocated for his release through various campaigns, expressed their joy on receiving the news.

=== Statements by human rights organizations ===
Several international human rights organizations including Amnesty International and Human Rights Watch have reported on his abduction and called for his release. Amnesty has said that Mir Ahmad was "arrested without a warrant by men in plainclothes on 9 August. He has been held incommunicado ever since, and has not been charged with any crime."

Human Rights Watch, in a report, claimed that Quasem was abducted by men who said that they were "members of the administration," without specifying which part of the security forces they belonged to. Despite asking them to produce a warrant, the men dragged Quasem away, saying that they "did not need a[n arrest] warrant."

The UN Working Group on Enforced or Involuntary Disappearances urged the government of Bangladesh to "immediately reveal whereabouts ... of all victims of enforced disappearance in Bangladesh", including that of Mir Ahmad. In August 2021, Human Rights Watch released a 57-page report titled "'Where No Sun Can Enter': A Decade of Enforced Disappearances in Bangladesh", where they noted that Mir Ahmad was among 86 victims of enforced disappearance in Bangladesh who were still missing.

=== International media coverage ===
On Al-Jazeera's Head to Head program broadcast on 1 March 2019, Quasem's lawyer Michael Polak asked a question on Quasem's abduction case to Bangladeshi Foreign Affairs Advisor Gowher Rizvi while the latter was being interviewed by show host Mehdi Hasan. Mr. Rizvi assured that investigations into all allegations of enforced disappearance would be carried out, and that he would personally assist in Mir Ahmad's case.

Foreign Policy has reported on the abduction of Mir Ahmad while discussing enforced disappearances in Bangladesh.

David Bergman, in an investigative report written for The Wire, has claimed that Quasem may have been abducted on direct orders of Bangladeshi Prime Minister Sheikh Hasina. Hasina is said to have given Bangladesh's military intelligence agency Directorate General of Forces Intelligence (DGFI) "clearance" to illegally pick up Mir Ahmad, as part of the government's widening crackdown on the country's opposition.

Quasem's case also made international headlines when Channel 4 news presenter Alex Thomson asked Hampstead and Kilburn MP Tulip Siddique, the niece of the Bangladeshi Prime Minister Sheikh Hasina, whether she would use her influence with the Bangladeshi government to help free Quasem in Bangladesh.

An article by Agence France-Presse (AFP), cited by Yahoo News, features an interview with a Bangladeshi lawyer who recounts the circumstances surrounding Mir Ahmad's disappearance and alleges direct involvement from the highest levels of the Bangladeshi government.

On 15 April 2025, the BBC reported on his eight years of imprisonment in a military base near Dhaka Airport, in cells some of which were too small to stretch out or stand up in.

== Political career ==
Quasem began his election campaigning in Dhaka-14 on the request of Shafiqur Rahman and in October 2025 he received the nomination from Bangladesh Jamaat-e-Islami. He became a Member of Parliament from the constituency in 2026 Bangladeshi general election.
