= Jubo League =

Youth wing of the Bangladesh Awami League party

Bangladesh Awami Jubo League বাংলাদেশ আওয়ামী যুবলীগ
- Chairman: Sheikh Fazle Shams Parash
- Secretary General: Md Mainul Hossain Khan Nikhil
- Founded: 11 November 1972; 53 years ago
- Dissolved: 12 May 2025; 16 months ago (Banned)
- Ideology: Mujibism; Bengali nationalism
- Mother party: Bangladesh Awami League
- Slogan: Joy Bangla, Joy Bangabandhu ('Victory to Bengal, victory to Bangabandhu')
- Website: www.jlbd.org/en/home

The Bangladesh Awami Jubo League (Bengali: বাংলাদেশ আওয়ামী যুবলীগ) commonly known as the Jubo League, is the first youth organization of Bangladesh founded by Sheikh Fazlul Haque Mani. It is the youth wing of Bangladesh Awami League. The Jubo League's last chairman was Sheikh Fazle Shams Parash and the last General Secretary was Md Mainul Hossain Khan Nikhil.

== History ==
The Jubo league was founded on 11 November 1972 by Sheikh Fazlul Haque Mani. On 12 May 2025, the government of Bangladesh banned all activities of the Awami League and its affiliated organisations under the Anti-Terrorism Act.

== Controversies ==
- Rapid Action Battalion (RAB) on 23 May 2015, arrested a Jubo League activist from Basanterbagh village, Begumganj Upazila, Noakhali District with an illegal gun.
- Detective Branch (DB) of the local police arrested Gias, a Jubo League leader in Kotwali area, Chittagong for involvement in the murder of security guard of Al Arafah Islami Bank's Muradpur Branch during an attempted robbery.
- Jubo League engaged in street fighting with Bangladesh Chhatra League over dropping of tender for government contract worth 100 million taka in Barisal City. About a dozen people were injured, including a journalist.
- The Jubo League expelled its Office Secretary Kazi Anisur Rahman, who went into hiding in the wake of the crackdown on illegal casinos, on charges of corruption in 2019.
- The RAB arrested "Casino Emperor", Dhaka South Awami Jubo League President Ismail Hossain Chowdhury Shamrat, for his links to the illegal casino businesses in "his territory". Cases filed against him included casino-gambling, tender business and extortion. Despite being a staunch supporter of the Awami League, he was arrested at the home of an affluent Bangladesh Jamaat-e-Islami leader.
- July massacre

== List of activists killed ==
- Jahir Uddin, 30, was murdered in Kabirhat area in Begumganj upazila, Noakhali District, on 22 May 2015.
- Akbar Ali, an activist of Jubo League was murdered in Begumganj upazila in Noakhali, on 20 May 2015.
- Kamal Uddin, 22, an activist of Jubo league of Lohagara upazila of Chittagong, was killed on 21 May 2015.
- Mohammad Yusuf, 35, president of Anderchar union unit Jubo League, was beaten to death in Laxmipur's Kamalanagar upazila on 5 March 2015 allegedly by political opponents.
- Md Mollah Arif, joint secretary of Jubo League's ward number 2 unit, was gunned down in Khilgaon on 8 April 2015.
- Azizul Haque, a Jubo League activist, was bludgeoned to death by BNP in front of a primary school on December 29, 2018, the day before the 2018 elections commenced.
