= Mir Quasem Ali =

Bangladeshi politician convicted of war crimes (1952–2016)

Quasem Ali
- মীর কাসেম আলী
- Born: 31 December 1952; Manikganj, East Bengal, Pakistan
- Died: 3 September 2016 (aged 63); Kashimpur Prison, Gazipur, Bangladesh
- Cause of death: Execution by hanging
- Citizenship: Pakistani (1952-1971); Bangladeshi (1971-2016)
- Occupations: Politician; businessman
- Political party: Bangladesh Jamaat-e-Islami
- Children: Arman; Sumaiya
- Conviction: Crimes against humanity
- Penalty: Death by hanging

Mir Quasem Ali (Bengali: মীর কাসেম আলী, romanized: Meer Kasem Ali; 31 December 1952 – 3 September 2016) was a Bangladeshi politician of the far-right Jamaat-e-Islami party. He was a former director of Islami Bank and chairman of the Diganta Media Corporation, which owns Diganta TV. He founded the Ibn Sina Trust and was a key figure in the establishment of the NGO Rabita al-Alam al-Islami. On 2 November 2014, he was convicted on all 10 charges and sentenced to death for abduction, murder, and crimes against humanity committed during the 1971 Independence War of Bangladesh.

Critics and opposition parties characterised the tribunal as politically motivated. Amnesty International criticised the use of the death penalty, saying Mir Quasem Ali's trial had been unfair. He was hanged at Gazipur on 3 September 2016 after his final appeal was rejected by the Supreme Court of Bangladesh.

== Early life ==
Mir Quasem Ali was born to Mir Rehmot and Rabeya Begum in Munsidangi Sutalori, Manikganj, on 31 December 1952. He joined the Islami Chhatra Sangha in 1967 while studying in Chittagong Collegiate School.

== Business ==
Mir Quasem Ali was a former director of Islami Bank, and chairman of the Diganta Media Corporation, which owns Diganta TV. He founded the Ibn Sina Trust and was a key figure in the establishment of the NGO Rabita al-Alam al-Islami. He was the chairman of Keari Ltd, Association of Multipurpose Welfare Agencies of Bangladesh and Agro Industrial Trust, director of marketing of Ibn Sina Pharmaceutical Industries, member secretary of Fouad Al-Khateeb Charity Foundation. He was part of management in Industrialists and Businessmen Welfare Foundation, Allama Iqbal Sangsad, International Islamic University Chittagong, Darul Ihsan University, Centre for Strategy and Peace Studies.

== Bangladesh War of Independence ==
Mir Quasem was a first-year student of Chittagong College in 1971 where he was pursuing a bachelor's degree in physics. He was the president of Chittagong Chhatra Sangha's unit. He was elected to the Pakistan Islami Chhatra Sangha's provincial working council on 6 November. He was also general secretary of East Pakistan Islami Chhatra Sangha. Al-Badr was a paramilitary force composed of Jamaat e Islami's then student wing Islami Chhatra Sangha to support the Pakistan army and crackdown on pro-independence groups.

The Al-Badr branch of Chittagong seized Mohamaya Bhaban building at Anderkilla, owned by a local Hindu family. They renamed it "Dalim Hotel" and used it as an interrogation and detention centre. Pro-independence activists Jahangir Alam Chowdhury and Syed Md Emran testified at Quasem's trial that the prison was used to torture suspected members of Mukti Bahini; Mukti Bahini members "Jasim", Tuntu Sen and Ranjit Das were killed at this place. Witnesses testified at the trial that guards at hotel Dalim would announce the arrival of Quasem with "Mr Quasem has come. Mr Commander has come."

== After independence ==
After independence, Quasem fled to Saudi Arabia. He returned to Bangladesh and became the founding president of Islami Chhatra Shibir, the Jamaat's student front, on 6 February 1977. The organisation is a successor to the Islami Chhatra Sangha.

== Trial ==
Out of the 14 charges, Quasem was convicted of 10 charges in the trial at International Crimes Tribunal and he was given a death sentence for two of the charges, namely murder and kidnapping. The chief prosecution witness against Quasem was professor Rajib Humayun. After the announcement of the verdict, the lawyers from the defence said that justice had not been done for Quasem and he did not get proper judgment. Gonojagoron Moncho supported the verdict and expressed satisfaction. The defence pledged an appeal to Bangladesh High court. Quasem's political Party Jamaat-e-Islami called for a nationwide three days strike as a protest over the verdict. He filed an appeal with the Supreme Court of Bangladesh. The supreme court rejected the review petition on 30 August 2016, and Ali refused to seek clemency.

=== Employment of US lobby firm ===
In 2010, after the formation of the International Crimes Tribunal, Quasem signed a 25 million US dollar deal with the most influential US lobby firm Cassidy & Associates to influence the US government to foil the war crimes trial process. In 2011, Quasem and his brother Mir Masum Ali again hired the same firm for the same purpose and paid $310,000 and that was the largest amount paid by any client in the first quarter of 2011. Not only that in 2014, sympathizer groups from the US again signed a contract with Cassidy & Associates to lobby for the same cause and promised to pay $50,000. Later Cassidy & Associates sub-contracted the task to another 2 firms named Cloakroom Advisors and Kgloba. Besides this, another pro-Jamaat-e-Islami organization appointed another lobbying firm named 'Just Consulting LLC' which was later renamed 'Grieboski Global Strategies' to influence the United States Commission on International Religious Freedom, the US Department of State and the US Congress against the war crimes trials.

=== Controversy ===
Some critics of then Awami League regime said that Sheikh Hasina, the prime minister of the country used the trials to target her political enemies.

In 2016, Human Rights Watch reported that Mir Quasem Ali's trial was flawed. It demanded a moratorium on the death penalty, after details emerged that the prosecution had for producing insufficient evidence in court. Brad Adams of HRW stated: "Allowing the death sentence in a case with such fundamental doubts about the evidence is unthinkable."

Amnesty International raised serious concerns about the court proceedings. These included denying defence lawyers adequate time to prepare their cases and arbitrarily limiting the number of witnesses they could call on. It urged the Bangladeshi government to annul the death sentence against Mir Quasem Ali and grant him a retrial, noting how the proceedings had reportedly been "marred" by irregularities. Amnesty spokeswoman Champa Patel said:

The people of Bangladesh deserve justice for crimes committed during the War of Independence. The continued use of the death penalty will not achieve this. It only serves to inflame domestic tensions and further divide a society riven by violence.

Human Rights Watch and Amnesty International also alleged that Mir Quasem Ali's son, Ahmed Bin Quasem, was arrested on 9 August 2016 and has since disappeared. Amnesty says multiple credible sources place him at Rapid Action Battalion (RAB) headquarters in Dhaka on 12 August but authorities have denied having him in custody.

== Execution ==
Mir Quasem Ali was hanged at Kashimpur prison in Gazipur on 3 September 2016. The government of Pakistan said in a statement that the country was "deeply saddened" by the execution. The Foreign Ministry of Turkey in a statement condemned the hanging as an inappropriate ruling.

== See also ==
- Mir Ahmad Bin Quasem
