= Shamsun Nahar =

Bangladeshi politician

- শামসুন নাহার
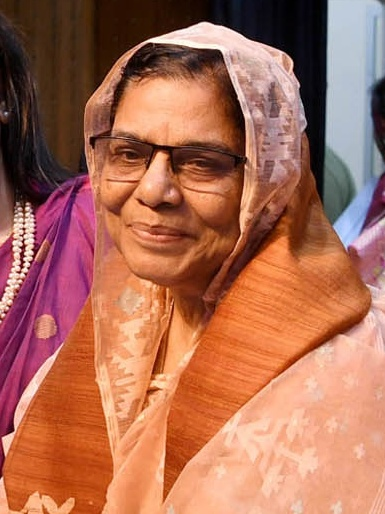
- Nahar at Eden Mohila College, Dhaka (2024)

Minister of State for Education
- In office 1 March 2024 – 6 August 2024
- Prime Minister: Sheikh Hasina
- Preceded by: Kazi Keramat Ali
- Succeeded by: Bobby Hajjaj

Member of the Bangladesh Parliament for Reserved Women's Seat-13
- In office 20 February 2019 – 6 August 2024

Personal details
- Born: 29 May 1957 (age 68) Gazipur District
- Party: Bangladesh Awami League
- Spouse: Abdur Rashid Bhuiya
- Relations: Abdur Razzaque (brother)
- Education: HSc

Shamsun Nahar or Shamshun Nahar Chapa (born 1 June 1958) is a politician of the Bangladesh Awami League. She was elected to the 11th Jatiya Sangsad of Bangladesh representing Tangail District on a reserved seat category for women. Chapa served as the state minister for education from 1 March 2024 until 6 August 2024.

== Early life ==
Shamsun Nahar was born at Tangail district. Chapa's father's name was Kasim Uddin Ahmed, a chairman of a village of Tangail, and her mother's name was Hamida Begum. Her brother, Abdur Razzaque, was a minister of agriculture. She was the general secretary of the Bangladesh Chhatra League unit of Shamsunnahar Hall while studying at the University of Dhaka.

== Career ==
Chapa retired from the National Institute of Mass Communication on 1 January 2016.

Nahar is an Awami League politician of Bangladesh. She was elected without competition among 49 others as 11th Jatiya Sangsad Member on the women's reserve seat-13. The speaker of the house Shirin Sharmin Chaudhury took her oath as a member on 20 February 2019.

She is the Education and Human Resource Affairs Secretary of the Awami League.

== See also ==
- List of Parliament members of 11th Jatiya Sangsad
