= Anima Mukti Gomez =

Bangladeshi politician

Anima Mukti Gomes
- অণিমা মুক্তি গোমেজ

Member of the Bangladesh Parliament for Reserved women's seat-29
- In office 28 February 2024 – 6 August 2024
- Preceded by: Aparajita Haque

Personal details
- Born: 28 December 1971 (age 54)
- Party: Bangladesh Awami League

Anima Mukti Gomes (born 28 December 1971) is a Awami League politician and a former Jatiya Sangsad member from a women's reserved for Dhaka District. She is a notable folk singer.
