= Adiba Anjum Mita =

Bangladeshi politician

Adiba Anjum Mita আদিবা আনজুম মিতা

Member of 11th Jatiya Sangsad of Reserved Seats for Women
- In office 16 February 2019 – 10 January 2024

Personal details
- Party: Bangladesh Awami League
- Occupation: Politician

Adiba Anjum Mita is a Bangladeshi politician who is elected as Member of 11th Jatiya Sangsad of Reserved Seats for Women. She is a politician of Bangladesh Awami League.
