= Nadira Yeasmin Jolly =

Bangladeshi politician

Member of Bangladesh Parliament
- Incumbent
- Assumed office 2019

Personal details
- Party: Bangladesh Awami League

Nadira Yeasmin Jolly is a Bangladesh Awami League politician and a member of the Bangladesh Parliament from a reserved seat.

== Career ==
Jolly was elected to parliament from reserved seat as a Bangladesh Awami League candidate in 2019.
