= Abdus Salam Pintu =

Bangladeshi politician

Md Abdus Salam Pintu
- মোঃ আব্দুস সালাম পিন্টু

Deputy Minister of Education
- In office 10 October 2001 – 22 May 2003

Deputy Minister of Industries
- In office 22 May 2003 – 13 March 2006

Deputy Minister of Information
- In office 13 March 2006 – 29 October 2006

Member of Parliament for Tangail-2
- In office 10 october 2001 – 29 october 2006
- Preceded by: Khandaker Asaduzzaman
- Succeeded by: Khandaker Asaduzzaman
- Incumbent
- Assumed office 17 February 2026

Personal details
- Party: Bangladesh Nationalist Party

Abdus Salam Pintu (Bengali: আব্দুস সালাম পিন্টু, romanized: Abdus Salam Pintu) is a Bangladeshi politician of the Bangladesh Nationalist Party (BNP) and former deputy Minister of Education.

== Career ==
Pintu served as deputy minister for education from 2001 to 2003. After that, he served as deputy minister of industries from 2003 to 2006.

In January 2008, Pintu was arrested for involvement in the 2004 Dhaka grenade attack. On 1 December 2024, he was acquitted by high court in August 21 grenade attack cases. In June 2008, the CID submitted charge sheet accusing 22, including Pintu and his brother, Maulana Tajuddin, a leader of Harkatul Jihad al Islami. In October 2016, he was found guilty on charges of killing through common intention, planning and criminal conspiracy and was sentenced to death.

Pintu was made vice-chairman of BNP's executive committee in 2016, at which time he was in prison.

He was released from jail after 17 years on 24 December 2024.
