= Mahfuza Rahman Rina =

Bangladeshi politician

Member of Bangladesh Parliament
- In office 2009–2014

Personal details
- Political party: Bangladesh Awami League

Mahfuza Rahman Rina is a Bangladesh Awami League politician and a former member of the Bangladesh Parliament in a seat reserved for women.

== Career ==
Rina was elected to a reserved seat in parliament as a Bangladesh Awami League candidate in 2009.
