= Dhaka-14 =

Constituency of Bangladesh's Jatiya Sangsad

- Constituency for the Jatiya Sangsad
- District: Dhaka District
- Division: Dhaka Division
- Electorate: 456,044 (2026)

Current constituency
- Created: 1973
- Party: Bangladesh Jamaat-e-Islami
- Member: Mir Ahmad Bin Quasem
- ← 186 Dhaka-13 188 Dhaka-15 →

Dhaka-14 is a constituency represented in the Jatiya Sangsad (National Parliament) of Bangladesh since 2026 by Mir Ahmad Bin Quasem of the Bangladesh Jamaat-e-Islami.

== Boundaries ==
The constituency encompasses Dhaka North City Corporation wards 7 through 12 and two union parishads of Savar Upazila: Bongaon and Kaundia.

== History ==
The constituency was created for the first general elections in newly independent Bangladesh, held in 1973.

As of 2008, the constituency encompassed Dhaka wards 7 through 12.

Dhaka City Corporation was split into Dhaka North City Corporation and Dhaka South City Corporation in 2011. For the 2014 general election, the constituency encompassed Dhaka North City Corporation wards 7 through 12 and one union parishad of Savar Upazila: Kaundia.

In 2025, the Bangladesh Election Commission expanded the boundaries of the constituency to include a second union parishad of Savar Upazila: Bongaon.

== Members of Parliament ==
Election	Member	Party
1973	Kamal Hossain	Awami League
1979	S. A. Khaleque	Bangladesh Nationalist Party
Major Boundary Changes
2008	Aslamul Haque	Awami League
2014	Aslamul Haque	Awami League
2018	Aslamul Haque	Awami League
2021 by-election	Aga Khan Mintu	Awami League
2024	Md Mainul Hossain Khan Nikhil	Awami League
2026	Mir Ahmad Bin Quasem	Bangladesh Jamaat-e-Islami

== Elections ==
=== Elections in the 2020s ===
General Election 2026: Dhaka-14
Party	Candidate	Votes	%	±%
Jamaat	Mir Ahmad Bin Quasem	101,113	48.9	N/A
BNP	Sanjida Islam Tulee	83,323	40.3	N/A
Independent	Syed Abu Bokor Siddique	16,328	7.9	N/A
IAB	Muhammad Abu Yusuf	3,760	1.8	N/A
JP(E)	Md. Helal Uddin	857	0.4	N/A
LDP	Md. Sohel Rana	385	0.2	N/A
CPB	Riaz Uddin	369	0.2	N/A
BSP	Md. Osman Ali	302	0.1	N/A
JSD (Rab)	Nurul Amin	219	0.1	N/A
AB Party	Mohammad Moniruzzaman	138	0.1	N/A
Bangladesh Republican Party	Md. Liton	83	0.0	N/A
Gano Forum	Md. Jasim Uddin	79	0.0	N/A
Majority		17,790	8.6	N/A
Turnout		206,956	45.4	N/A
Registered electors		456,044		
Jamaat gain from AL				

=== Elections in the 2010s ===
General Election 2018: Dhaka-14
Party	Candidate	Votes	%	±%
AL	Aslamul Haque	197,130	77.9	N/A
BNP	Sayed Abu Bakar Siddique	5,498	21.7	N/A
JP(E)	Mostaqur Rahman	1,099	0.4	N/A
Majority		142,149	56.13	
Turnout		253,210	62.30	
Registered electors		4,06,444		
AL hold				

Aslamul Haque was elected unopposed in the 2014 general election after opposition parties withdrew their candidacies in a boycott of the election.

=== Elections in the 2000s ===
General Election 2008: Dhaka-14
Party	Candidate	Votes	%	±%
AL	Aslamul Haque	148,440	62.0	
BNP	S. A. Khaleque	84,849	35.5	
IAB	Md. Harun-or-Rashid	2,885	1.2	
Zaker Party	Md. Kaysar Hamid	1,683	0.7	
BTF	Syed Najibul Bashar Maizbhandari	974	0.4	
Gano Forum	Ferdoysi Sultana	282	0.1	
Bangladesh Kalyan Party	Salauddin Swapan	144	0.1	
Majority		63,591	26.6	
Turnout		239,257	73.6	
AL win (new boundaries)				
