= Bangladesh Mohila Awami League =

Women wing of Bangladesh Awami League

- বাংলাদেশ মহিলা আওয়ামী লীগ
- Logo of Mohila League
- Formation: February 27, 1969; 57 years ago
- Dissolved: 10 May 2025 (Banned)
- Headquarters: Dhaka, Bangladesh
- Region served: Bangladesh
- Official language: Bengali
- President: Meher Afroz Chumki
- Secretary General: Shabnam Jahan
- Parent organization: Awami League

The Bangladesh Mohila Awami League is the women wing of Bangladesh Awami League. Meher Afroz Chumki is the president and Shabnam Jahan Shila is the general secretary of the league. The Mohila League has infrequent elections for local and national positions, and witnesses fractional conflicts.

== History ==
The Bangladesh Mohila Awami League was established on 27 February 1969. Nurjahan Murshid was the first general secretary of Mohila Awami League, serving from 1969 to 1971, and would go on to become first health Minister of Bangladesh. On 12 July 2003, the Bangladesh Mohila Awami League held its council in which Ashrafunnesa Mosharraf, a former member of the Mukti Bahini, was elected president and Fazilatunnesa Indira was elected general secretary. On 24 December 2004, a Mohila Awami League meeting at the home of Syeda Jebunnesa Haque, former Member of Parliament, in Sylhet was bombed by Islamic extremists.

President of Mohila League, Ivy Rahman, was killed in the 2004 Dhaka grenade attack. Mohila Awami League activists were clubbed and arrested on 25 August 2004 while protesting against 2004 bomb attack. The Chittagong unit of Mohila Awami League occupied the land of Bangladesh Shipping Corporation in 2009 to establish their office.

On 16 February 2017, the Chittagong City unit of Bangladesh Mohila Awami League held its council in the King of Chittagong community centre. The council saw clashes between fractions led by Hasina Mohiuddin and Nomita Aich. The last council of the city unit was held in 1998. In the 1998 council, Nilufar Kaisar was elected president and Tapoti Sen Gupta was elected general secretary of the unit. Kaiser was the wife of Ataur Rahman Khan Kaiser, a Bangladesh Awami League leader. After the death of Kaiser, Hasina Mohiuddin, wife of A B M Mohiuddin Chowdhury and vice-president of Bangladesh Mohila Awami League, became the acting president.

On 4 March 2017, the Bangladesh Mohila Awami League held its national council, the first time since 12 July 2003. Shafia Khatun was elected President of the League while Mahmuda Begum was elected General Secretary. They have a term of three years. On 25 October 2018, Khaleda Khanom, General Secretary of Jhenidah District unit of Mohila League, sued Barrister Moinul Hossain for 5 billion taka for defaming journalist Masuda Bhatti. A number of other Awami League activists sued Moinul.

On 12 May 2025, The government of Bangladesh banned all activities of the Awami League and its affiliated organisations under the Anti-Terrorism Act.
