= Ratna Ahmed =

Bangladeshi politician

- রত্না আহমেদ

Member of Bangladesh Parliament
- In office 2019–2024

Member of 11th Jatiya Sangsad of Reserved Seats for Women

Personal details
- Born: 7 August 1957 (age 68)
- Party: Bangladesh Awami League
- Education: B.A
- Occupation: Politics; Business

Ratna Ahmed is a Bangladesh Awami League politician and a Member of the Bangladesh Parliament from a reserved seat.

== Career ==
Ahmed was elected to parliament from reserved seat in Natore as a Bangladesh Awami League candidate in 2019.
