= Habiba Rahman Khan =

Bangladeshi politician

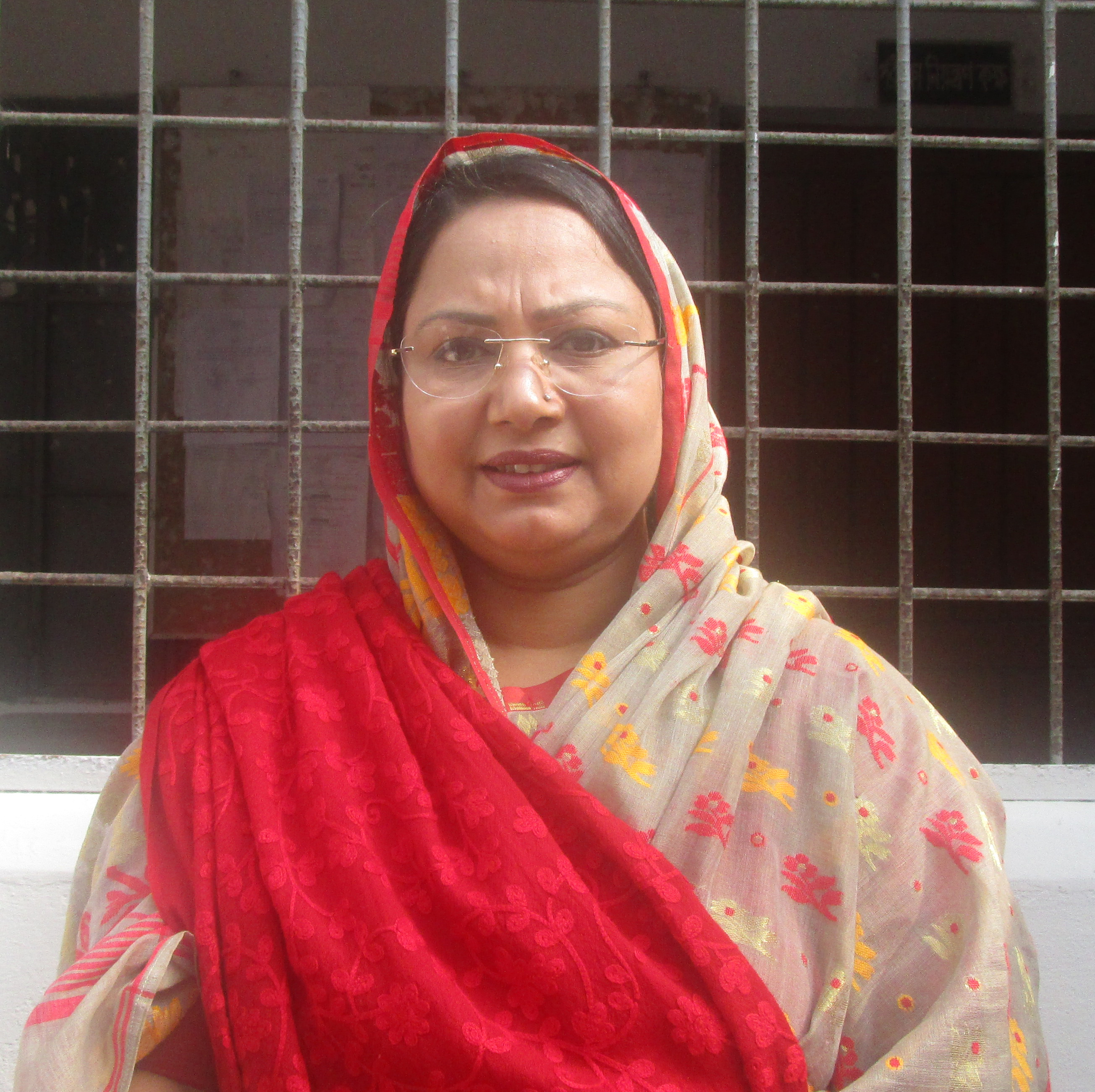

Member of Bangladesh Parliament
- Incumbent
- Assumed office 2019

Personal details
- Political party: Bangladesh Awami League

Habiba Rahman Khan is a Bangladesh Awami League politician and a member of the Bangladesh Parliament from a reserved seat.

== Career ==
Khan was elected to parliament from a reserved seat as a Bangladesh Awami League candidate in 2019.
