= Aslamul Haque =

Bangladeshi politician and businessman (1961–2021)

- আসলামুল হক
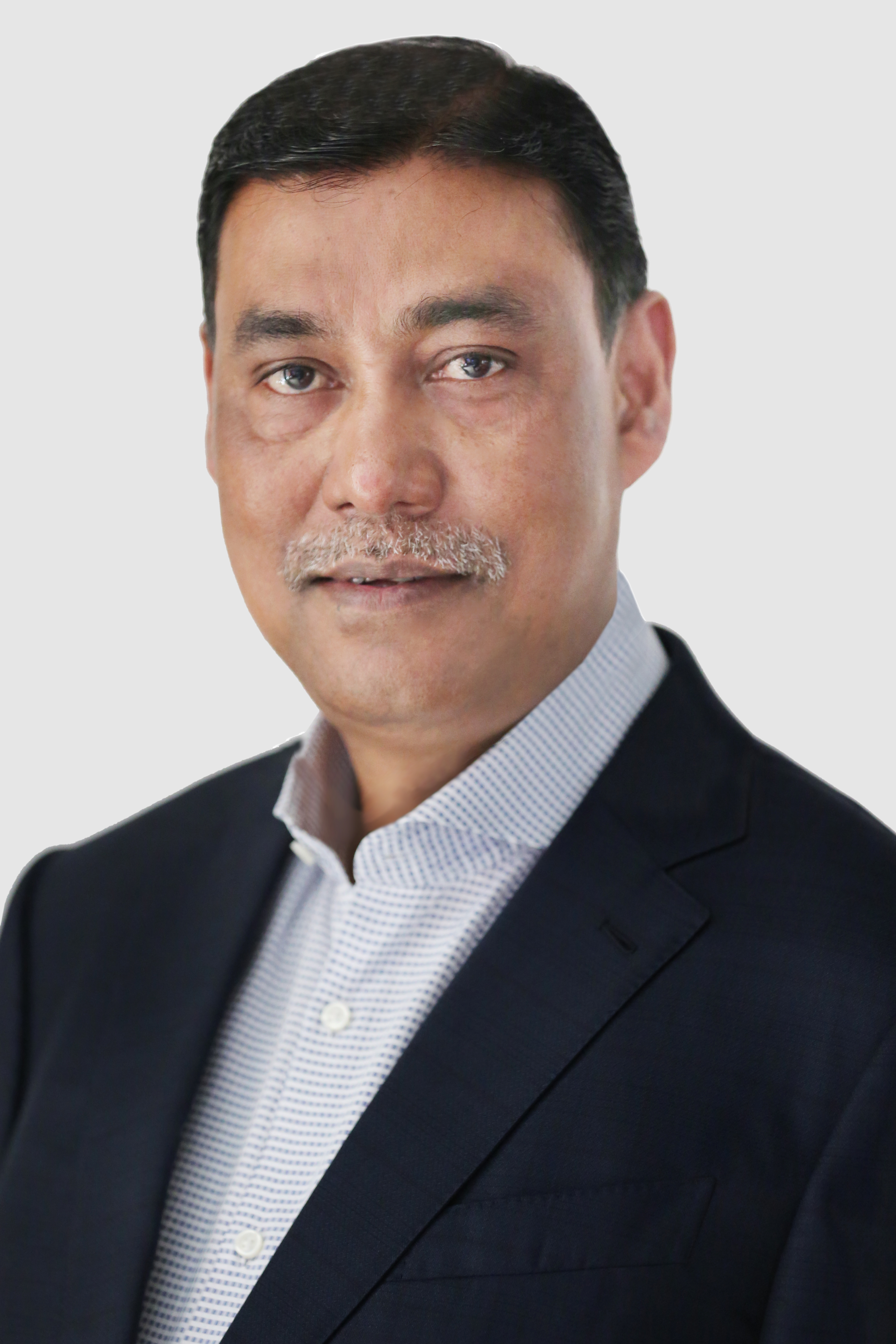
- Haque in 2018

Member of Bangladesh Parliament
- In office 25 January 2009 – 4 April 2021
- Preceded by: "Constituency created"
- Succeeded by: Aga Khan Mintu
- Constituency: Dhaka-14

Personal details
- Born: 14 May 1961 Dhaka, East Pakistan, Pakistan
- Died: 4 April 2021 (aged 59) Dhaka, Bangladesh
- Party: Bangladesh Awami League

Aslamul Haque (14 May 1961 – 4 April 2021) was a Bangladeshi entrepreneur, businessman and politician. He was a Bangladesh Awami League politician and member of parliament from the Dhaka-14 constituency since its inception in 2009 until his death in 2021.

== Biography ==
Aslam attended Mirpur Bengali Medium High School (now Mirpur Govt. High School).

He was the founder and chairman of Maisha Group, a business conglomerate in Bangladesh. He began building his business in 1992. Maisha Group began as Maisha Property Development Ltd. He was the member of Commonwealth of Independent States-Bangladesh Chamber of Commerce and Industry. Maisha Group developed Arisha Private Economic Zone in Dhaka.

== Controversy ==
In March 2020, Bangladesh Inland Water Transport Authority sought to demolish apparent illegal structures owned by Aslam in Dhaka. They demolished parts of a power plant owned by him.

== Death ==
Aslamul Haque died on April 4, 2021, while undergoing treatment at Square Hospital in Dhaka.
