= Khanom Kan =

Khanom Kan خانم كن
- Village
- Location within Iran
- Coordinates: 35°39′45″N 46°02′30″E
- Country: Iran
- Province: Kurdistan
- County: Marivan
- Bakhsh: Khav and Mirabad
- Rural District: Khav and Mirabad

Population (2006)
  - Total: 191
- Time zone: UTC+3:30 (IRST)
  - Summer (DST): UTC+4:30 (IRDT)

Khanom Kan (Persian: خانم كن, also Romanized as Khānom Kon; also known as Khānam-i-Kūn, Khanom Goon, Khānom Gūn, and Khānom Kohneh) is a village in Khav and Mirabad Rural District, Khav and Mirabad District, Marivan County, Kurdistan Province, Iran. At the 2006 census, its population was 191, in 42 families. The village is populated by Kurds.
