= Khanom Sheykhan =

Village in Kurdistan, Iran

Khanom Sheykhan خانم شيخان
- Village
- Location within Iran
- Coordinates: 35°39′12″N 46°01′10″E
- Country: Iran
- Province: Kurdistan
- County: Marivan
- Bakhsh: Khav and Mirabad
- Rural District: Khav and Mirabad

Population (2006)
  - Total: 22
- Time zone: UTC+3:30 (IRST)
  - Summer (DST): UTC+4:30 (IRDT)

Khanom Sheykhan (Persian: خانم شيخان, also Romanized as Khānom Sheykhān, Khānam-i-Shaikhan, and Khānom-e Sheykhān) is a village in Khav and Mirabad Rural District, Khav and Mirabad District, Marivan County, Kurdistan Province, Iran. At the 2006 census, its population was 22, in 7 families. The village is populated by Kurds.
