= Dorothy Rahman =

Bangladeshi politician

Member of Parliament for Reserved Women's Seat-19
- In office 16 November 2022 – 7 January 2024
- Preceded by: Sheikh Anne Rahman

Personal details
- Party: Bangladesh Awami League

Dorothy Rahman is a Bangladesh Awami League politician and former member of the Bangladesh Parliament from the reserved women's seat-19.

== Career ==
Rahman was elected to parliament for a "reserved seat" as a Bangladesh Awami League candidate in 2022 after the seat fell vacant following the death of lawmaker Sheikh Anne Rahman. She was sworn in on 16 November 2022.
