= Mohammad Abdur Razzaque =

Bangladeshi politician (born 1950)

- মোহাম্মদ আব্দুর রাজ্জাক
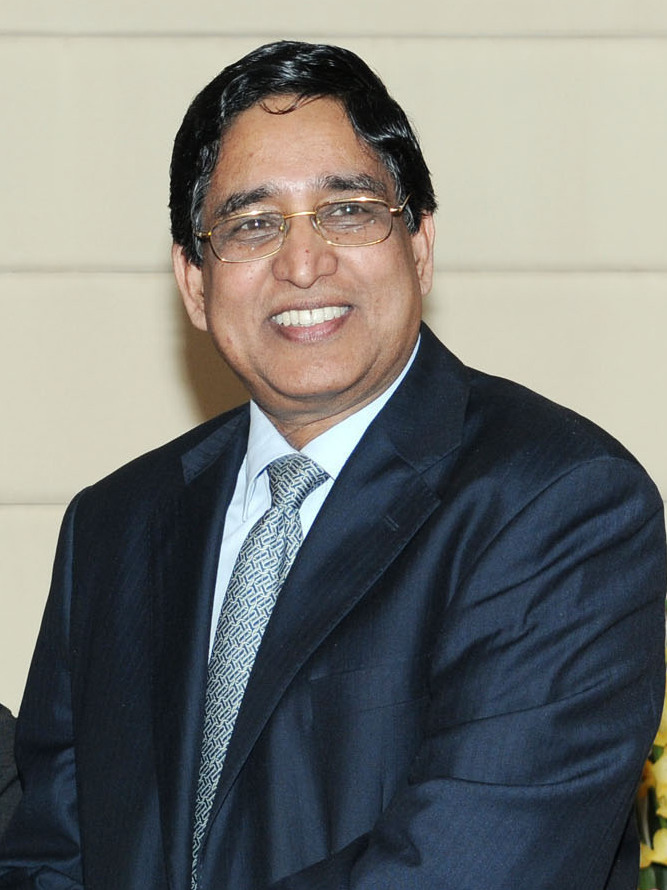
- Razzaque in 2011

Minister of Agriculture
- In office 7 January 2019 – 11 January 2024
- Prime Minister: Sheikh Hasina
- Preceded by: Matia Chowdhury
- Succeeded by: Abdus Shahid

Member of Parliament for Tangail-1
- In office 28 October 2001 – 6 August 2024
- Preceded by: Abul Hasan Chowdhury
- Succeeded by: Fakir Mahbub Anam Swapan

Minister of Food
- In office September 2012 – January 2014
- Succeeded by: Kamrul Islam

Minister of Food and Disaster Management
- In office 6 January 2009 – September 2012
- Preceded by: M M Shawkat Ali
- Succeeded by: Qamrul Islam

Personal details
- Born: 1 February 1950 (age 76) Musuddi, Tangail, East Bengal, Pakistan
- Party: Bangladesh Awami League
- Relatives: Shamshun Nahar Chapa (sister)
- Education: Bangladesh Agricultural University; Purdue University
- Occupation: Politician, agriculturalist

Mohammad Abdur Razzaque (Bengali: মোহাম্মদ আব্দুর রাজ্জাক, romanized: Mohammod Abdur Razzak; born 1 February 1950) is a Bangladeshi politician. He is a former Jatiya Sangsad member representing the Tangail-1 constituency during 2001–2024. He was the Minister of Agriculture of Bangladesh. He served as Minister of Food and Disaster Management from 2009 to 2012 and then as Minister of Food until 2013. He became the chairman of the Parliamentary Standing Committee for Finance in 2014. He has also been serving as a presidium member of the Bangladesh Awami League since 2016.

Razzaque was also the head of the Election Manifesto sub-committee of the Bangladesh Awami League for the 11th Bangladeshi general election in 2018.

== Early life and career ==
Abdur Razzaque was born on 1 February 1950 in Musuddi village of Tangail subdivision, East Bengal, Pakistan (now Dhanbari Upazila, Tangail District, Bangladesh), to Jalal Uddin and Rezia Khatun. He has distinctively completed graduation with honors from Bangladesh Agricultural University (BAU) in 1971 and also completed post graduation in 1972 from the same campus. From Purdue University in the US, he achieved his PhD in 1983. He is one among the very few experts on this land on farming system research and sustainable rural agricultural development. He has further studied at East Anglia University in the UK and participated in several training programs at home and abroad.

Razzaque started his career by joining Bangladesh Agricultural Development Corporation (BADC) as a scientific officer and ended as the chief scientific officer in 2001.

== Contribution in Liberation War 1971 ==
In the 6 point, 11 point, and anti-Ayub movements, Razzaque took an essential part. He was a company commander in the 1971 Bangladesh Liberation War. He is one of the freedom fighters in Tangail Zila.

== Political career ==
Razzaque started his political career in student life. He was elected the vice president of the student union of Bangladesh Agricultural University. He was also the president of Bangladesh Student League, BAU unit.

Razzaque was first elected as the Member of Parliament for Tangail-1 in 2001. He also served as the agricultural secretary of the Bangladesh Awami League for many years before being elected as a presidium member in the National Council of the party held in October 2016. He was appointed Minister of Food and Disaster Management in 2009. After the ministry was split in two in 2012, he continued as Minister of Food until 2013.

After the fall of the Sheikh Hasina-led Awami League government, Razzaque was detained in October 2024 by the Detective Branch.

== Served ==
- Bangladesh Agricultural Research Council (former director)
- Bangladesh Agronomist Institution (secretary general) 1996–97
