= Syeda Zohra Alauddin =

Bangladeshi politician

- সৈয়দা জোহরা আলাউদ্দিন

Member of Bangladesh Parliament
- In office 8 February 2019 – 2024

Member of 11th Jatiya Sangsad of Reserved Seats for Women

Personal details
- Party: Bangladesh Awami League
- Spouse: Muhammad Alauddin Chowdhury
- Education: M.A
- Alma mater: Dhaka University
- Occupation: Women's community organizer

Syeda Zohra Alauddin (Bengali: সৈয়দা জোহরা আলাউদ্দিন) is a Bangladesh Awami League politician and a member of parliament from a reserved seat.

== Early life and education ==
Alauddin joined the Bangladesh Chhatra League in 1967, and later became vice president of the district Chattra League. She was arrested for participating in the 1969 East Pakistan mass uprising. She married Muhammad Alauddin Chowdhury, an ex-freedom fighter of the Bangladesh Liberation War.

== Career ==
She was elected to parliament from a reserved seat as a Bangladesh Awami League candidate in 2019. She is the woman's secretary of the Moulvibazar District unit of Bangladesh Awami League.
