= Happy Baral =

Bangladeshi politician

Member of Parliament

Personal details
- Party: Bangladesh Awami League

Happy Baral (Bengali: হেপী বড়াল) is a Bangladesh Awami League politician and a former member of parliament from reserved seat-11.

== Early life ==
Baral was born on 1 January 1968.

== Career ==
Baral was elected to parliament on 5 January 2014 from women reserved seat-11 as a Bangladesh Awami League candidate.

== Personal life ==
Baral was married to Kalidas Baral. He was a lawyer, Bangladesh Awami League politician, and member of the Bangladesh Hindu Buddhist Christian Unity Council. He was shot and killed on 20 August 2000. A court in Bagerhat District sentenced five convicts to death on 6 June 2013.
