= Zakia Tabassum =

Bangladeshi politician

Zakia Tabassum জাকিয়া তাবাসসুম

Member of 11th Jatiya Sangsad of Reserved Seats for Women
- In office 16 February 2019 – 10 January 2024
- Preceded by: Jahan Ara Begum Surma

Personal details
- Party: Bangladesh Awami League
- Occupation: Politician, Advocate

Zakia Tabassum is a Bangladeshi politician who was elected as Member of 11th Jatiya Sangsad of Reserved Seats for Women. She is a politician of Bangladesh Awami League.

== Family ==
Advocate Zakia Tabassum also known as her nickname Jui. Advocate Azizur Rahman M.N.A, one of the top organizers of the Great Liberation War in Bangladesh is her father. Poet and cultural figure Mujtaba Ahmed Murshed is her sibling. She is the youngest of four brothers and four sisters.

== Others Information ==
Advocate Zakia Tabassum Jui is a literary and cultural figure. She was the founding general secretary of 'Dinajpur Lekhok Parishad' and the present president of the committee.
