= Zakia Parvin Khanam =

Bangladeshi politician

- জাকিয়া পারভীন খানম

Member of 11th Jatiya Sangsad of Reserved Seats for Women
- In office 16 February 2019 – 2024

Personal details
- Party: Bangladesh Awami League
- Occupation: Politician

Zakia Parvin Khanam is a Bangladeshi politician who is elected as Member of 11th Jatiya Sangsad of Reserved Seats for Women. She is a politician of Bangladesh Awami League.
