= Kh. Momota Hena Lovely =

Bangladeshi politician

Member of Bangladesh Parliament
- In office 2019–2024

Personal details
- Party: Bangladesh Awami League

Kh. Momota Hena Lovely was a Bangladesh Awami League politician and a member of the Bangladesh parliament from a reserved seat.

== Career ==
Lovely was elected to parliament from a reserved seat as a Bangladesh Awami League candidate in 2019. She was a member of the Parliamentary Standing Committee on the Ministry of Information.
