= Begum Akhtar Jahan =

Bangladeshi politician

Begun Akhtar Jahan

Member of Parliament for Reserved Women's Seat - 5
- In office 2014–2018
- Preceded by: Ashrafunnesa Mosharraf
- Succeeded by: Naheed Ezaher Khan

Personal details
- Born: 1 July 1952 (age 74)
- Party: Awami League

Begum Akhtar Jahan (born 1 July 1952) is an Awami League politician and former member of parliament.

== Early life ==
Jahan was born on 1 July 1952. She completed her bachelor's and master's at the University of Rajshahi in 1973 and 1974 respectively. In 1985, she completed a second master's from the University of Dhaka.

== Career ==
Jahan started her career as a librarian at the University of Rajshahi. She retired from the university as the deputy librarian.

Jahan served as Jatiya Sangsad member representing the Reserved Women's Seat - 5 from 2014 to 2018. In 2019, she was awarded Begum Rokeya Padak by the Government of Bangladesh.
