= Aga Khan Mintu =

Bangladeshi politician

- আগা খান মিন্টু

Member of Parliament for Dhaka-14
- In office 24 June 2021 – 29 January 2024
- Preceded by: Aslamul Haque
- Succeeded by: Mainul Hossain Khan Nikhil

Personal details
- Born: 15 March 1952 (age 74)
- Party: Bangladesh Awami League

Aga Khan Mintu (born 15 March 1952) is a freedom fighter, Bangladesh Awami League politician and former Jatiya Sangsad member from the Dhaka-14 constituency.

== Career ==
He was a freedom fighter during the 1971 Bangladesh Liberation War.

Mintu served as the commissioner of Gabtali-Mirpur area in 1994. He was the vice president of Greater Mirpur Thana Awami League. He is currently the president of Shah Ali Thana Awami League. Before that he did student politics in 1970, and was a freedom fighter in the 1971 Bangladesh Liberation War.

Aslamul Haque, the previous Jatiya Sangsad member from the Dhaka-14 constituency, died in office on 4 April 2021. Mintu was then elected uncontested in that vacant position on 24 June in a by-election.
