= Tangail-1 =

Constituency of Bangladesh's Jatiya Sangsad

Coordinates: 24.60°N 90.03°E

- Constituency for the Jatiya Sangsad
- District: Tangail District
- Division: Dhaka Division
- Electorate: 437,433 (2026)

Current constituency
- Created: 1973
- Party: Bangladesh Nationalist Party
- Member: Fakir Mahbub Anam Swapan
- ← 129 Pirojpur-3 131 Tangail-2 →

Tangail-1 is a constituency represented in the Jatiya Sangsad (National Parliament) of Bangladesh since 2026 by Fakir Mahbub Anam Swapan of the Bangladesh Nationalist Party.

== Boundaries ==
The constituency encompasses Dhanbari and Madhupur upazilas.

== History ==
The constituency was created for the first general elections in newly independent Bangladesh, held in 1973.

== Members of Parliament ==
| Election | Member | Party |
|---|---|---|
| 1973 | Abdus Sattar | Jatiya Samajtantrik Dal |
| 1979 | Syed Hasan Ali Chowdhury | Bangladesh Nationalist Party |
| 1981 by-election | Syeda Ashiqua Akbar | Bangladesh Nationalist Party |
Major Boundary Changes
| 1986 | Nizamul Islam | Awami League |
| 1988 | Khandaker Anwarul Haque | Independent |
| 1991 | Abul Hasan Chowdhury | Awami League |
| Feb 1996 | Abdus Salam Talukder | Bangladesh Nationalist Party |
| Jun 1996 | Abul Hasan Chowdhury | Awami League |
| 2001 | Mohammad Abdur Razzaque | Awami League |
| 2026 | Fakir Mahbub Anam Swapan | Bangladesh Nationalist Party |

== Elections ==
=== Elections in the 2020s ===
General Election 2026: Tangail-1
| Party | Candidate | Votes | % | ±% |
|---|---|---|---|---|
| BNP | Fakir Mahbub Anam Swapan | 153,932 | 54.7 | N/A |
| Jamaat | Mohammad Abdullah Kafi | 94,462 | 33.6 | N/A |
| Independent | Md. Asadul Islam | 28,259 | 10.0 | N/A |
| JP(E) | Muhammad Ilyas Hossain | 2,194 | 0.8 | N/A |
| IAB | Md. Harun Or Rashid | 1,731 | 0.6 | N/A |
| Independent | Muhammad Ali | 723 | 0.3 | N/A |
| Majority | | 59,470 | 21.1 | N/A |
| Turnout | | 281,301 | 64.3 | N/A |
| BNP gain from AL | | | | |

=== Elections in the 2010s ===
Abdur Razzak was re-elected unopposed in the 2014 general election after opposition parties withdrew their candidacies in a boycott of the election.

=== Elections in the 2000s ===
General Election 2008: Tangail-1
| Party | Candidate | Votes | % | ±% |
|---|---|---|---|---|
| AL | Mohammad Abdur Razzaque | 171,022 | 65.7 | +15.5 |
| BNP | Fakir Mahbub Anam | 88,461 | 34.0 | +13.1 |
| KSJL | Habibur Rahman Talukder | 808 | 0.3 | −0.8 |
| Majority | | 82,561 | 31.7 | +8.8 |
| Turnout | | 260,291 | 90.0 | +15.2 |
| AL hold | | | | |

General Election 2001: Tangail-1
| Party | Candidate | Votes | % | ±% |
|---|---|---|---|---|
| AL | Mohammad Abdur Razzaque | 98,413 | 50.2 | −0.9 |
| Independent | Abdul Gafur Montu | 53,509 | 27.3 | N/A |
| BNP | Fakir Mahbub Anam | 40,972 | 20.9 | −22.4 |
| KSJL | Abdul Kader Siddique | 2,206 | 1.1 | N/A |
| IJOF | Fatema Khan | 805 | 0.4 | N/A |
| Jatiya Party (M) | Md. Jamilur Rahman Khan | 122 | 0.1 | N/A |
| Independent | Md. A. Gafur | 80 | 0.0 | N/A |
| Majority | | 44,904 | 22.9 | +15.1 |
| Turnout | | 196,107 | 74.8 | −1.8 |
| AL hold | | | | |

=== Elections in the 1990s ===
General Election June 1996: Tangail-1
| Party | Candidate | Votes | % | ±% |
|---|---|---|---|---|
| AL | Abul Hasan Chowdhury | 77,738 | 51.1 | +12.7 |
| BNP | Abdus Salam Talukdar | 65,834 | 43.3 | +6.9 |
| JP(E) | Abu Sayeed Khan | 4,286 | 2.8 | +1.9 |
| Jamaat | Mujibur Rahman | 4,170 | 2.7 | −5.5 |
| Majority | | 11,904 | 7.8 | +5.8 |
| Turnout | | 152,028 | 76.6 | +23.8 |
| AL hold | | | | |

General Election 1991: Tangail-1
| Party | Candidate | Votes | % | ±% |
|---|---|---|---|---|
| AL | Abul Hasan Chowdhury | 37,454 | 38.4 | |
| BNP | Asika Akbar | 35,507 | 36.4 | |
| JSD (S) | Md. Abdus Samad | 14,810 | 15.2 | |
| Jamaat | Mujibur Rahman | 7,989 | 8.2 | |
| JP(E) | Abu Sayeed Khan | 868 | 0.9 | |
| CPB | Shree Soroj Bondhu Dev | 812 | 0.8 | |
| Majority | | 1,947 | 2.0 | |
| Turnout | | 97,440 | 52.8 | |
| AL gain from | | | | |
