= Sayeda Rashida Begum =

Bangladeshi politician

- সৈয়দা রাশিদা বেগম

Member of the Bangladesh Parliament for Reserved Women's Seat-35
- In office 2019–2024

Personal details
- Born: 1 May 1962 (age 63)
- Party: Bangladesh Awami League
- Spouse: Late Syed Nizam Uddin Light
- Education: Class 8
- Occupation: Business; politics

Sayeda Rashida Begum is a Bangladesh Awami League politician and a former member of the Bangladesh Parliament from a reserved seat.

== Career ==
Begum was elected to parliament from a reserved seat as a Bangladesh Awami League candidate in 2019. She is a member of the parliamentary standing committee on the women and children affairs ministry.
