= Mst. Khaleda Khanum =

Bangladeshi politician

Khaleda Khanum

Member of 11th Jatiya Sangsad
- In office 2019 – January 2024

Personal details
- Born: Jhenaidah, Bangladesh
- Party: Awami League

Khaleda Khanum is a Bangladesh Awami League politician and a member of the Bangladesh Parliament from a reserved seat.

== Career ==
Khanum was elected to parliament from a reserved seat as a Bangladesh Awami League candidate in 2019.
