= Shamsul Haque Talukder =

Bangladeshi politician

Member of Bangladesh Parliament

Personal details
- Party: Jatiya Party (Ershad)

Shamsul Haque Talukder is a Jatiya Party (Ershad) politician and a former member of parliament for Tangail-2.

== Career ==
Talukder was elected to parliament from Tangail-2 as a Jatiya Party candidate in 1986. He was elected Bhuapur Upazila Parishad Chairman. He was removed from his post by the government for alleged corruption.
