= Nargis Rahman =

Bangladeshi politician

Member of Bangladesh Parliament
- In office 2019–2024

Personal details
- Party: Bangladesh Awami League

Nargis Rahman is a Bangladesh Awami League politician and a former member of the Bangladesh Parliament from a reserved seat.

== Career ==
Rahman was elected to parliament from a reserved seat as a Bangladesh Awami League candidate in 2019.
