= Shamima Akter Khanam =

Bangladeshi politician

Shamima Akhter Khanam

Member of Bangladesh Parliament
- In office 2019–2024

Personal details
- Political party: Bangladesh Awami League

Shamima Akhter Khanam, also known as Shamima Shahriar, is a Bangladesh Awami League politician and a former member of the Bangladesh Parliament. She came from "reserved seat" (Sunamganj, Sylhet).

== Career ==
Khanam was the female vice chairman of Jamalganj Upazila Parishad, and as of 2019 is human resources secretary of the Awami Krishak League.

Khanam sought the Awami League nomination for constituency Sunamganj-1 in the 2018 Bangladeshi general election. Unable to secure that nomination, she was one of 12 women who sought the party's nomination for one of the two reserved seats for women representing the Sylhet Division. She was elected to parliament from a reserved seat as a Bangladesh Awami League candidate in 2019.

After the fall of the Sheikh Hasina led Awami League government, Khanam was arrested in May 2025.
