= Ferdosi Islam =

Bangladeshi politician

Member of Bangladesh Parliament
- Incumbent
- Assumed office 2019

Personal details
- Party: Bangladesh Awami League

Ferdosi Islam is a Bangladesh Awami League politician and a former member of the Bangladesh Parliament from a reserved seat.

== Biography ==
Ferdosi Islam was born in Chapai Nawabganj to A. A. M. Mesbahul Haq. Islam was elected to parliament from reserved seat as a Bangladesh Awami League candidate in 2019. She sought nomination to a reserved seat in 2024, but the Awami League instead chose Zara Jabeen Mahbub for the seat.
