= Tangail-2 =

Constituency of Bangladesh's Jatiya Sangsad

Coordinates: 24.55°N 89.93°E

- Constituency for the Jatiya Sangsad
- District: Tangail District
- Division: Dhaka Division
- Electorate: 418,606 (2026)

Current constituency
- Created: 1973
- Party: Bangladesh Nationalist Party
- Member: Abdus Salam Pintu
- ← 130 Tangail-1 132 Tangail-3 →

Tangail-2 is a constituency represented in the Jatiya Sangsad (National Parliament) of Bangladesh since 2026 by Abdus Salam Pintu of the Bangladesh Nationalist Party.

== Boundaries ==
The constituency encompasses Bhuapur and Gopalpur upazilas.

== History ==
The constituency was created for the first general elections in newly independent Bangladesh, held in 1973.

== Members of Parliament ==
Election	Member	Party
1973	Hatem Ali Talukdar	Awami League
1979	Afazuddin Fakir	Bangladesh Nationalist Party
Major Boundary Changes
1986	Shamsul Haque Talukder	Jatiya Party
1988	Abdul Matin Mia	Jatiya Samajtantrik Dal (Siraj)
1991	Abdus Salam Pintu	Bangladesh Nationalist Party
Feb 1996	Abdus Salam Pintu	Bangladesh Nationalist Party
Jun 1996	Khandaker Asaduzzaman	Awami League
2001	Abdus Salam Pintu	Bangladesh Nationalist Party
2008	Khandaker Asaduzzaman	Awami League
2018	Tanvir Hasan Soto Monir	Awami League
2026	Abdus Salam Pintu	Bangladesh Nationalist Party

== Elections ==
=== Elections in the 2020s ===
General Election 2026: Tangail-2
Party	Candidate	Votes	%	±%
BNP	Abdus Salam Pintu	198,213	74.6	N/A
Jamaat	Md. Humayun Kabir	60,871	22.9	N/A
IAB	Md. Monowar Hossain Sagar	4,777	1.8	N/A
JP(E)	Md. Humayun Kabir Talukder	1,854	0.7	N/A
Majority		137,342	51.7	N/A
Turnout		265,715	63.5	N/A
BNP gain from AL				

=== Elections in the 2010s ===
General Election 2014: Tangail-2
Party	Candidate	Votes	%	±%
AL	Khandaker Asaduzzaman	140,759	94.6	+37.0
JP(E)	Azizur Rahman Tarafdar	8,017	5.4	N/A
Majority		132,742	89.2	+72.8
Turnout		148,776	47.7	−41.0
AL hold				

=== Elections in the 2000s ===
General Election 2008: Tangail-2
Party	Candidate	Votes	%	±%
AL	Khandaker Asaduzzaman	144,710	57.6	+10.0
BNP	Sultan Salahuddin Tuku	103,509	41.2	−7.5
KSJL	Khaleda Habib	2,033	0.8	−0.8
BDB	Munirul Islam	552	0.2	N/A
Zaker Party	Anamul Haque Manju	410	0.2	N/A
Majority		41,201	16.4	+15.3
Turnout		251,214	88.7	+12.8
AL gain from BNP				

General Election 2001: Tangail-2
Party	Candidate	Votes	%	±%
BNP	Abdus Salam Pintu	105,273	48.7	+7.8
AL	Khandaker Asaduzzaman	102,999	47.6	+1.5
IJOF	Md. Shamsul Haq Talukder	4,296	2.0	N/A
KSJL	Abdul Kader Siddique	3,519	1.6	N/A
Jatiya Party (M)	Aziz Bangal	236	0.1	N/A
Majority		2,274	1.1	−4.1
Turnout		216,323	75.9	+0.3
BNP gain from AL				

=== Elections in the 1990s ===
General Election June 1996: Tangail-2
Party	Candidate	Votes	%	±%
AL	Khandaker Asaduzzaman	77,086	46.1	+7.2
BNP	Abdus Salam Pintu	68,406	40.9	−10.8
JP(E)	Md. Shamim Al Mamun	15,188	9.1	+0.9
Jamaat	Md. Abdus Salam Khan	5,801	3.5	N/A
Gano Forum	Faridul Alam Talukdar	371	0.2	N/A
Democratic Republican Party	Md. Helal Uddin Khan	237	0.1	N/A
Majority		8,680	5.2	−7.6
Turnout		167,089	75.6	+18.4
AL gain from BNP				

General Election 1991: Tangail-2
Party	Candidate	Votes	%	±%
BNP	Abdus Salam Pintu	75,603	51.7	
AL	Hatem Ali Talukdar	56,852	38.9	
JP(E)	Shamsul Haq Talukdar	12,016	8.2	
UCL	K. Jahangir	530	0.4	
Zaker Party	Md. Ali	512	0.4	
Independent	Md. Rafiqul Islam	452	0.3	
Independent	Sham Shankar Dutta	217	0.1	
Majority		18,751	12.8	
Turnout		146,182	57.2	
BNP gain from JSD (S)				
