= List of members of the 9th Jatiya Sangsad =

9th Jatiya Sangsad
←	8th	10th	→
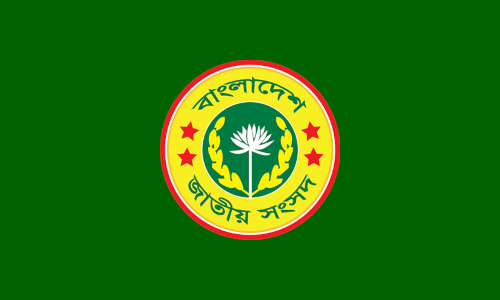
- Flag of the Jatiya Sangsad

Overview
- Legislative body: Bangladesh Parliament
- Term: 25 January 2009 – 24 January 2014
- Election: 2008
- Government: Awami League
- Opposition: Bangladesh Nationalist Party

Sovereign
- President: Iajuddin Ahmed; Zillur Rahman; Mohammad Abdul Hamid

House of the Nation
- Speaker: Mohammad Abdul Hamid; Shirin Sharmin Chaudhury
- Deputy Speaker: Shawkat Ali
- Leader of the House: Sheikh Hasina
- Leader of the Opposition: Khaleda Zia

The following is a list of Members of Parliament (MPs) elected to the Jatiya Sangsad (National Parliament of Bangladesh) from 300 Constituencies for the 9th Parliament of Bangladesh.

It includes both MPs elected at the 2008 general election, held on 29 December 2008. Nominated women's members for reserved seat and Those subsequently elected in by-elections.

== Members ==
=== Member of Parliament ===
Constituency		Name	Party
1	Panchagarh-1	Mazharul Haque Prodhan	Awami League
2	Panchagarh-2	Md. Nurul Islam Sujon	Awami League
3	Thakurgaon-1	Ramesh Chandra Sen	Awami League
4	Thakurgaon-2	Dabirul Islam	Awami League
5	Thakurgaon-3	Hafiz Uddin Ahmed	Jatiya Party
6	Dinajpur-1	Manoranjan Shill Gopal	Awami League
7	Dinajpur-2	Khalid Mahmud Chowdhury	Awami League
8	Dinajpur-3	Iqbalur Rahim	Awami League
9	Dinajpur-4	Abul Hassan Mahmood Ali	Awami League
10	Dinajpur-5	Mostafizur Rahman Fizar	Awami League
11	Dinajpur-6	Azizul Haque Choudhury	Awami League
12	Nilphamari-1	Jafar Iqbal Siddiki	Jatiya Party
13	Nilphamari-2	Asaduzzaman Noor	Awami League
14	Nilphamari-3	Kazi Faruque Kader	Jatiya Party
15	Nilphamari-4	A. A. Maruf Saklain	Awami League
16	Lalmonirhat-1	Motahar Hossain	Awami League
17	Lalmonirhat-2	Mujibur Rahman	Jatiya Party
18	Lalmonirhat-3	Ghulam Muhammed Quader	Jatiya Party
19	Rangpur-1	Hossain Mokbul Shahriar	Jatiya Party
20	Rangpur-2	Anisul Islam Mondal	Jatiya Party
21	Rangpur-3	Rowshan Ershad By-election: 30 March 2009	Jatiya Party
22	Rangpur-4	Tipu Munshi	Awami League
23	Rangpur-5	H. N. Ashequr Rahman	Awami League
24	Rangpur-6	Abul Kalam Azad By-election: 30 March 2009	Awami League
25	Kurigram-1	A.K.M. Mostafizur Rahman	Awami League
26	Kurigram-2	Zafar Ali By-election: 30 March 2009	Awami League
27	Kurigram-3	AKM Maidul Islam	Jatiya Party
28	Kurigram-4	Md Zakir Hossain	Awami League
29	Gaibandha-1	Abdul Kader Khan	Jatiya Party
30	Gaibandha-2	Mahabub Ara Begum Gini	Awami League
31	Gaibandha-3	TIM Fazle Rabbi Chowdhury	Jatiya Party
32	Gaibandha-4	Monowar Hossain Chowdhury	Awami League
33	Gaibandha-5	Fazle Rabbi Miah	Awami League
34	Joypurhat-1	Mozahar Ali Prodhan	Bangladesh Nationalist Party
35	Joypurhat-2	Golam Mostafa	Bangladesh Nationalist Party
36	Bogra-1	Abdul Mannan	Awami League
37	Bogra-2	A. K. M. Hafizur Rahman	Bangladesh Nationalist Party
38	Bogra-3	Abdul Momen Talukder	Bangladesh Nationalist Party
39	Bogra-4	Z. I. M. Mostofa Ali	Bangladesh Nationalist Party
40	Bogra-5	Habibar Rahman	Awami League
41	Bogra-6	Muhammad Jamiruddin Sircar By-election: 30 March 2009	Bangladesh Nationalist Party
42	Bogra-7	Moudud Ahmed By-election: 30 March 2009	Bangladesh Nationalist Party
43	Chapai Nawabganj-1	Muhammad Enamul Huq	Awami League
44	Chapai Nawabganj-2	Md. Ziaur Rahman	Awami League
45	Chapai Nawabganj-3	Md. Abdul Odud	Awami League
46	Naogaon-1	Sadhan Chandra Majumder	Awami League
47	Naogaon-2	Shahiduzzaman Sarker	Awami League
48	Naogaon-3	Akram Hossain Chowdhury	Awami League
49	Naogaon-4	Emaz Uddin Pramanik	Independent
50	Naogaon-5	Abdul Jalil Died: 6 March 2013	Awami League
50	Naogaon-5	Md. Abdul Maleque By-election: 6 May 2013	Awami League
51	Naogaon-6	Israfil Alam	Awami League
52	Rajshahi-1	Omor Faruk Chowdhury	Awami League
53	Rajshahi-2	Fazle Hossain Badsha	Workers Party of Bangladesh
54	Rajshahi-3	Meraj Uddin Mollah	Awami League
55	Rajshahi-4	Enamul Haque	Awami League
56	Rajshahi-5	Abdul Wadud Dara	Awami League
57	Rajshahi-6	Shahriar Alam	Awami League
58	Natore-1	Abu Talha	Jatiya Party
59	Natore-2	Ahad Ali Sarker	Awami League
60	Natore-3	Zunaid Ahmed Palak	Awami League
61	Natore-4	Abdul Quddus	Awami League
62	Sirajganj-1	Tanvir Shakil Joy	Awami League
63	Sirajganj-2	Rumana Mahmood	Bangladesh Nationalist Party
64	Sirajganj-3	Ishaque Hossain Talukder	Awami League
65	Sirajganj-4	Md. Shafiqul Islam	Awami League
66	Sirajganj-5	Abdul Latif Biswas	Awami League
67	Sirajganj-6	Choyon Islam	Awami League
68	Pabna-1	Shamsul Haque Tuku	Awami League
69	Pabna-2	Abdul Karim Khandker	Awami League
70	Pabna-3	Md. Mokbul Hossain	Awami League
71	Pabna-4	Shamsur Rahman Sherif	Awami League
72	Pabna-5	Golam Faruk Khandakar Prince	Awami League
73	Meherpur-1	Joynal Abeden	Awami League
74	Meherpur-2	Amzad Hossain	Bangladesh Nationalist Party
75	Kushtia-1	Afaz Uddin Ahmed	Awami League
76	Kushtia-2	Hasanul Haq Inu	Jatiya Samajtantrik Dal
77	Kushtia-3	Khandaker Rashiduzzaman Dudu	Awami League
78	Kushtia-4	Sultana Tarun	Awami League
79	Chuadanga-1	Solaiman Haque Joarder	Awami League
80	Chuadanga-2	Md. Ali Azgar	Awami League
81	Jhenaidah-1	Abdul Hyee	Awami League
82	Jhenaidah-2	Md. Shafiqul Islam	Awami League
83	Jhenaidah-3	Shafiqul Azam Khan	Awami League
84	Jhenaidah-4	Abdul Mannan	Awami League
85	Jessore-1	Sheikh Afil Uddin	Awami League
86	Jessore-2	Mostafa Faruk Mohammad	Awami League
87	Jessore-3	Mohammad Khaledur Rahman Tito	Awami League
88	Jessore-4	Ranajit Kumar Roy	Awami League
89	Jessore-5	Khan Tipu Sultan	Awami League
90	Jessore-6	Sheikh Abdul Wahab	Awami League
91	Magura-1	Muhammad Serajul Akbar	Awami League
92	Magura-2	Biren Sikder	Awami League
93	Narail-1	Md. Kabirul Haque	Independent
94	Narail-2	SK Abu Bakr	Awami League
95	Bagerhat-1	Sheikh Helal By-election: 30 March 2009	Awami League
96	Bagerhat-2	Mir Showkat Ali Badsha	Awami League
97	Bagerhat-3	Habibun Nahar	Awami League
98	Bagerhat-4	Mozammel Hossain	Awami League
99	Khulna-1	Nani Gopal Mandal	Awami League
100	Khulna-2	Nazrul Islam Manju	Bangladesh Nationalist Party
101	Khulna-3	Monnujan Sufian	Awami League
102	Khulna-4	Molla Jalal Uddin	Awami League
103	Khulna-5	Narayon Chandra Chanda	Awami League
104	Khulna-6	Sohorab Ali Sana	Awami League
105	Satkhira-1	Sheikh Mujibur Rahman	Awami League
106	Satkhira-2	M. A. Jabbar	Jatiya Party
107	Satkhira-3	AFM Ruhal Haque	Awami League
108	Satkhira-4	HM Golam Reza	Jatiya Party
109	Barguna-1	Direndra Debnath Shambhu	Awami League
110	Barguna-2	Golam Sabur Tulu Died: 26 July 2013	Awami League
110	Barguna-2	Showkat Hasanur Rahman Rimon By-election: 3 October 2013	Awami League
111	Patuakhali-1	Shahjahan Mia	Awami League
112	Patuakhali-2	A. S. M. Feroz	Awami League
113	Patuakhali-3	Golam Maula Rony	Awami League
114	Patuakhali-4	Md. Mahbubur Rahman Talukdar	Awami League
115	Bhola-1	Andaleeve Rahman Partho	Bangladesh Jatiya Party
116	Bhola-2	Tofail Ahmed	Awami League
117	Bhola-3	Mohammad Jashimuddin Invalid: 18 October 2009	Awami League
117	Bhola-3	Nurunnabi Chowdhury Shaon By-election: 25 April 2010	Awami League
118	Bhola-4	Abdullah Al Islam Jakob	Awami League
119	Barisal-1	Talukder Mohammad Yunus	Awami League
120	Barisal-2	Manirul Islam	Awami League
121	Barisal-3	Golam Kibria Tipu	Jatiya Party
122	Barisal-4	Md. Mazbauddin Farhad	Bangladesh Nationalist Party
123	Barisal-5	Majibur Rahman Sarwar	Bangladesh Nationalist Party
124	Barisal-6	A.B.M. Ruhul Amin Howlader	Jatiya Party
125	Jhalokati-1	Bazlul Haque Haroon	Awami League
126	Jhalokati-2	Amir Hossain Amu	Awami League
127	Pirojpur-1	A. K. M. A. Awal Saydur Rahman	Awami League
128	Pirojpur-2	Shah Alam	Awami League
129	Pirojpur-3	Anwar Hossain	Awami League
130	Tangail-1	Mohammad Abdur Razzaque	Awami League
131	Tangail-2	Khandaker Asaduzzaman	Awami League
132	Tangail-3	Mohammad Matiur Rahman Died: 14 September 2012	Awami League
132	Tangail-3	Amanur Rahman Khan By-election: 18 November 2012	Independent
133	Tangail-4	Abdul Latif Siddiqui	Awami League
134	Tangail-5	Abul Kashem Invalid: 15 December 2009	Jatiya Party
134	Tangail-5	Mahmudul Hasan Took office: 30 May 2012	Bangladesh Nationalist Party
135	Tangail-6	Khandaker Abdul Baten	Independent
136	Tangail-7	Md. Akabbar Hossain	Awami League
137	Tangail-8	Shawkat Momen Shahjahan	Awami League
138	Jamalpur-1	Abul Kalam Azad	Awami League
139	Jamalpur-2	Md. Faridul Haq Khan	Awami League
140	Jamalpur-3	Mirza Azam	Awami League
141	Jamalpur-4	Murad Hasan	Awami League
142	Jamalpur-5	Rezaul Karim Hira	Awami League
143	Sherpur-1	Md. Atiur Rahman Atik	Awami League
144	Sherpur-2	Matia Chowdhury	Awami League
145	Sherpur-3	AKM Fazlul Haque	Awami League
146	Mymensingh-1	Promode Mankin	Awami League
147	Mymensingh-2	Hayatur Rahman Khan	Awami League
148	Mymensingh-3	Mozibur Rahman Fakir	Awami League
149	Mymensingh-4	Motiur Rahman	Awami League
150	Mymensingh-5	K. M. Khalid	Awami League
151	Mymensingh-6	Moslem Uddin	Awami League
152	Mymensingh-7	Reza Ali	Awami League
153	Mymensingh-8	Abdus Sattar	Awami League
154	Mymensingh-9	Abdus Salam	Awami League
155	Mymensingh-10	Gias Uddin Ahmed	Awami League
156	Mymensingh-11	Mohammed Amanullah	Awami League
157	Netrokona-1	Mustaque Ahmed Ruhi	Awami League
158	Netrokona-2	Ashraf Ali Khan Khasru	Awami League
159	Netrokona-3	Monjur Kader Kuraishi	Awami League
160	Netrokona-4	Rebecca Momin	Awami League
161	Netrokona-5	Waresat Hussain Belal	Awami League
162	Kishoreganj-1	Sayed Ashraful Islam	Awami League
163	Kishoreganj-2	M. A. Mannan	Awami League
164	Kishoreganj-3	Mujibul Haque Chunnu	Jatiya Party
165	Kishoreganj-4	Mohammad Abdul Hamid Become president: 24 April 2013	Awami League
165	Kishoreganj-4	Rejwan Ahammad Taufiq By-election: 3 July 2013	Awami League
166	Kishoreganj-5	Md. Afzal Hossain	Awami League
167	Kishoreganj-6	Zillur Rahman Become president: 12 February 2009	Awami League
167	Kishoreganj-6	Nazmul Hassan Papon By-election: 30 March 2009	Awami League
168	Manikganj-1	A. B. M. Anowarul Haque	Awami League
169	Manikganj-2	S. M. Abdul Mannan	Jatiya Party
170	Manikganj-3	Zahid Maleque	Awami League
171	Munshiganj-1	Sukumar Ranjan Ghosh	Awami League
172	Munshiganj-2	Sagufta Yasmin Emily	Awami League
173	Munshiganj-3	M. Idris Ali	Awami League
174	Dhaka-1	Abdul Mannan Khan	Awami League
175	Dhaka-2	Qamrul Islam	Awami League
176	Dhaka-3	Nasrul Hamid	Awami League
177	Dhaka-4	Sanjida Khanam	Awami League
178	Dhaka-5	Habibur Rahman Mollah	Awami League
179	Dhaka-6	Mizanur Rahman Khan Dipu Died: 21 December 2013	Awami League
180	Dhaka-7	Mostofa Jalal Mohiuddin	Awami League
181	Dhaka-8	Rashed Khan Menon	Workers Party of Bangladesh
182	Dhaka-9	Saber Hossain Chowdhury	Awami League
183	Dhaka-10	A.K.M. Rahmatullah	Awami League
184	Dhaka-11	Asaduzzaman Khan	Awami League
185	Dhaka-12	Sheikh Fazle Noor Taposh	Awami League
186	Dhaka-13	Jahangir Kabir Nanak	Awami League
187	Dhaka-14	Aslamul Haque	Awami League
188	Dhaka-15	Kamal Ahmed Majumder	Awami League
189	Dhaka-16	Elias Uddin Mollah	Awami League
190	Dhaka-17	Hussain Muhammad Ershad	Jatiya Party
191	Dhaka-18	Sahara Khatun	Awami League
192	Dhaka-19	Talukdar Mohammad Towhid Jung Murad	Awami League
193	Dhaka-20	Benzir Ahmed	Awami League
194	Gazipur-1	AKM Mozammel Haque	Awami League
195	Gazipur-2	Zahid Ahsan Russel	Awami League
196	Gazipur-3	Md. Rahamat Ali	Awami League
197	Gazipur-4	Tanjim Ahmad Sohel Taj Resigned: 7 July 2012	Awami League
197	Gazipur-4	Simeen Hussain Rimi By-election: 30 September 2012	Awami League
198	Gazipur-5	Meher Afroz Chumki	Awami League
199	Narsingdi-1	Muhammad Nazrul Islam	Awami League
200	Narsingdi-2	Anwarul Ashraf Khan	Awami League
201	Narsingdi-3	Zahirul Haque Bhuiyan Mohan	Awami League
202	Narsingdi-4	Nurul Majid Mahmud Humayun	Awami League
203	Narsingdi-5	Rajiuddin Ahmed Raju	Awami League
204	Narayanganj-1	Golam Dastagir Gazi	Awami League
205	Narayanganj-2	Nazrul Islam Babu	Awami League
206	Narayanganj-3	Abdullah-Al-Kaisar	Awami League
207	Narayanganj-4	Sarah Begum Kabori	Awami League
208	Narayanganj-5	Nasim Osman	Jatiya Party
209	Rajbari-1	Kazi Keramat Ali	Awami League
210	Rajbari-2	Zillul Hakim	Awami League
211	Faridpur-1	Abdur Rahman	Awami League
212	Faridpur-2	Syeda Sajeda Chowdhury	Awami League
213	Faridpur-3	Khandaker Mosharraf Hossain	Awami League
214	Faridpur-4	Nilufer Zafarullah	Awami League
215	Gopalganj-1	Faruk Khan	Awami League
216	Gopalganj-2	Sheikh Fazlul Karim Selim	Awami League
217	Gopalganj-3	Sheikh Hasina	Awami League
218	Madaripur-1	Noor-E-Alam Chowdhury Liton	Awami League
219	Madaripur-2	Shajahan Khan	Awami League
220	Madaripur-3	Syed Abul Hossain	Awami League
221	Shariatpur-1	B. M. Muzammel Haque	Awami League
222	Shariatpur-2	Shawkat Ali	Awami League
223	Shariatpur-3	Abdur Razzaq Died: 23 December 2011	Awami League
223	Shariatpur-3	Nahim Razzaq By-election: 26 February 2012	Awami League
224	Sunamganj-1	Moazzem Hossain Ratan	Awami League
225	Sunamganj-2	Suranjit Sengupta	Awami League
226	Sunamganj-3	M. A. Mannan	Awami League
227	Sunamganj-4	Momtaj Iqbal Died: 17 April 2009	Jatiya Party
227	Sunamganj-4	Md. Matiur Rahman By-election: 16 June 2009	Awami League
228	Sunamganj-5	Mohibur Rahman Manik	Awami League
229	Sylhet-1	Abul Maal Abdul Muhith	Awami League
230	Sylhet-2	Shafiqur Rahaman Chowdhury	Awami League
231	Sylhet-3	Mahmud Us Samad Chowdhury	Awami League
232	Sylhet-4	Imran Ahmad	Awami League
233	Sylhet-5	Hafiz Ahmed Mazumder	Awami League
234	Sylhet-6	Nurul Islam Nahid	Awami League
235	Moulvibazar-1	Md. Shahab Uddin	Awami League
236	Moulvibazar-2	Nawab Ali Abbas Khan	Jatiya Party
237	Moulvibazar-3	Syed Mohsin Ali	Awami League
238	Moulvibazar-4	Mohammed Abdus Shahid	Awami League
239	Habiganj-1	Dewan Farid Gazi Died: 19 November 2010	Awami League
239	Habiganj-1	Sheikh Sujat Mia By-election: 28 January 2011	Bangladesh Nationalist Party
240	Habiganj-2	Md. Abdul Majid Khan	Awami League
241	Habiganj-3	Md. Abu Zahir	Awami League
242	Habiganj-4	Enamul Haque Mostafa Shahid	Awami League
243	Brahmanbaria-1	Mohammad Sayedul Haque	Awami League
244	Brahmanbaria-2	Md. Ziaul Haque Mridha	Jatiya Party
245	Brahmanbaria-3	Lutful Hai Sachchu Died: 22 November 2010	Awami League
245	Brahmanbaria-3	Obaidul Muktadir Chowdhury By-election: 28 January 2011	Awami League
246	Brahmanbaria-4	Mohammad Shah Alam	Awami League
247	Brahmanbaria-5	Shah Jikrul Ahmad	Jatiya Samajtantrik Dal
248	Brahmanbaria-6	A. B. Tajul Islam	Awami League
249	Comilla-1	Mohammad Shubid Ali Bhuiyan	Awami League
250	Comilla-2	M. K. Anwar	Bangladesh Nationalist Party
251	Comilla-3	Kazi Shah Mofazzal Hossain Kaikobad	Bangladesh Nationalist Party
252	Comilla-4	ABM Ghulam Mostafa	Awami League
253	Comilla-5	Abdul Matin Khasru	Awami League
254	Comilla-6	A. K. M. Bahauddin Bahar	Awami League
255	Comilla-7	Ali Ashraf	Awami League
256	Comilla-8	Nasimul Alam Chowdhury	Awami League
257	Comilla-9	Mohammad Tazul Islam	Awami League
258	Comilla-10	A. H. M. Mustafa Kamal	Awami League
259	Comilla-11	Mujibul Haque Mujib	Awami League
260	Chandpur-1	Muhiuddin Khan Alamgir	Awami League
261	Chandpur-2	Mohammad Rafiqul Islam	Awami League
262	Chandpur-3	Dipu Moni	Awami League
263	Chandpur-4	Harunur Rashid	Bangladesh Nationalist Party
264	Chandpur-5	Rafiqul Islam	Awami League
265	Feni-1	Begum Khaleda Zia	Bangladesh Nationalist Party
266	Feni-2	Joynal Abedin	Bangladesh Nationalist Party
267	Feni-3	Mosharraf Hossain	Bangladesh Nationalist Party
268	Noakhali-1	Mahbub Uddin Khokon	Bangladesh Nationalist Party
269	Noakhali-2	Zainul Abdin Farroque	Bangladesh Nationalist Party
270	Noakhali-3	Barkat Ullah Bulu	Bangladesh Nationalist Party
271	Noakhali-4	Ekramul Karim Chowdhury	Awami League
272	Noakhali-5	Obaidul Quader	Awami League
273	Noakhali-6	Mohammad Fazlul Azim	Independent
274	Lakshmipur-1	Nazim Uddin Ahmed	Bangladesh Nationalist Party
275	Lakshmipur-2	Abul Khair Bhuiyan	Bangladesh Nationalist Party
276	Lakshmipur-3	Shahid Uddin Chowdhury Anee	Bangladesh Nationalist Party
277	Lakshmipur-4	A. B. M. Ashraf Uddin	Bangladesh Nationalist Party
278	Chittagong-1	Engineer Mosharraf Hossain	Awami League
279	Chittagong-2	Salahuddin Quader Chowdhury	Bangladesh Nationalist Party
280	Chittagong-3	ABM Abul Kashem	Awami League
281	Chittagong-4	Anisul Islam Mahmud	Jatiya Party
282	Chittagong-5	A. B. M. Fazle Karim Chowdhury	Awami League
283	Chittagong-6	Hasan Mahmud	Awami League
284	Chittagong-7	Mayeen Uddin Khan Badal	Jatiya Samajtantrik Dal
285	Chittagong-8	Nurul Islam BSc	Awami League
286	Chittagong-9	Muhammad Afsarul Ameen	Awami League
287	Chittagong-10	M. Abdul Latif	Awami League
288	Chittagong-11	Shamsul Haque Chowdhury	Awami League
289	Chittagong-12	Akhtaruzzaman Chowdhury Died: 4 November 2012	Awami League
289	Chittagong-12	Saifuzzaman Chowdhury By-election: 17 January 2013	Awami League
290	Chittagong-13	Oli Ahmad	Liberal Democratic Party
291	Chittagong-14	Shamsul Islam	Bangladesh Jamaat-e-Islami
292	Chittagong-15	Jafrul Islam Chowdhury	Bangladesh Nationalist Party
293	Chittagong-16	Mostafa Kamal Pasha	Bangladesh Nationalist Party
294	Cox's Bazar-1	Hasina Ahmed	Bangladesh Nationalist Party
295	Cox's Bazar-2	A. H. M. Hamidur Rahman Azad	Bangladesh Jamaat-e-Islami
296	Cox's Bazar-3	Lutfur Rahman Kajal	Bangladesh Nationalist Party
297	Cox's Bazar-4	Abdur Rahman Bodi	Awami League
298	Khagrachari	Jotindra Lal Tripura	Awami League
299	Rangamati	Dipankar Talukdar	Awami League
300	Bandarban	Bir Bahadur Ushwe Sing	Awami League

=== Members of Reserved Women's Seat ===
Constituency		Name	Party
301	Women's Seat-1	Khadiza Khatun Shefali	Awami League
302	Women's Seat-2	Apu Ukil	Awami League
303	Women's Seat-3	Momotaj Begum	Awami League
304	Women's Seat-4	Asma Zerin Jhumu	Awami League
305	Women's Seat-5	Ashrafunnesa Mosharraf	Awami League
306	Women's Seat-6	Ahmed Nazmin Sultana	Awami League
307	Women's Seat-7	Aye Thein Rakhaine	Awami League
308	Women's Seat-8	Tarana Halim	Awami League
309	Women's Seat-9	Cheman Ara Taiyab	Awami League
310	Women's Seat-10	Jahanara Begum	Awami League
311	Women's Seat-11	Zinnatunnesa Talukdar	Awami League
312	Women's Seat-12	Zobeda Khatun Parul	Awami League
313	Women's Seat-13	Nazma Akhter	Awami League
314	Women's Seat-14	Noor Afroj Ali	Awami League
315	Women's Seat-15	Noor Jahan Begum	Awami League
316	Women's Seat-16	Parvin Talukder Maya	Awami League
317	Women's Seat-17	Farida Rahman	Awami League
318	Women's Seat-18	Faridun Nahar Laily	Awami League
319	Women's Seat-19	Tahura Ali	Awami League
320	Women's Seat-20	Saleha Mosharraf	Awami League
321	Women's Seat-21	Momtaz Begum	Awami League
322	Women's Seat-22	Mahfuza Rahman Rina	Awami League
323	Women's Seat-23	Amina Ahmed	Awami League
324	Women's Seat-24	Shefali Momtaz	Awami League
325	Women's Seat-25	Farida Akhter Hira	Awami League
326	Women's Seat-26	Raoshan Jahan Sathi	Awami League
327	Women's Seat-27	Rubi Rahman	Awami League
328	Women's Seat-28	Shawkat Ara Begum	Awami League
329	Women's Seat-29	Shahida Tareque Dipti	Awami League
330	Women's Seat-30	Shaheen Monwara Haque	Awami League
331	Women's Seat-31	Shirin Sharmin Chaudhury	Awami League
332	Women's Seat-32	Sadhana Halder	Awami League
333	Women's Seat-33	Shafia Khatun	Awami League
334	Women's Seat-34	Sultana Bulbul	Awami League
335	Women's Seat-35	Syeda Jebunnesa Haque	Awami League
336	Women's Seat-36	Hamida Banu Shova	Awami League
337	Women's Seat-37	Nilufar Chowdhury Moni	Bangladesh Nationalist Party
338	Women's Seat-38	Shammi Akter	Bangladesh Nationalist Party
339	Women's Seat-39	Rasheda Begum Hira	Bangladesh Nationalist Party
340	Women's Seat-40	Rehana Akter Ranu	Bangladesh Nationalist Party
341	Women's Seat-41	Syeda Asifa Ashrafi Papia	Bangladesh Nationalist Party
342	Women's Seat-42	Nasreen Jahan Ratna	Jatiya Party
343	Women's Seat-43	Noor-E-Hasna Lily Chowdhury	Jatiya Party
344	Women's Seat-44	Mahjabeen Morshed	Jatiya Party
345	Women's Seat-45	Salma Islam	Jatiya Party
346	Women's Seat-46	Fazilatun Nessa Indira	Awami League
347	Women's Seat-47	Fazilatunnesa Bappy	Awami League
348	Women's Seat-48	Hasina Mannan	Awami League
349	Women's Seat-49	Pinu Khan	Awami League
350	Women's Seat-50	Baby Maudud	Awami League
