= List of members of the 7th Jatiya Sangsad =

7th Jatiya Sangsad
←	6th	8th	→
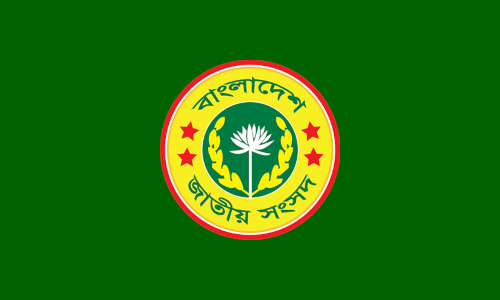
- Flag of the Jatiya Sangsad

Overview
- Legislative body: Bangladesh Parliament
- Term: 14 July 1996 – 13 July 2001
- Election: June 1996
- Government: Awami League
- Opposition: Bangladesh Nationalist Party

Sovereign
- President: Abdur Rahman Biswas; Shahabuddin Ahmed

House of the Nation
- Speaker: Humayun Rashid Choudhury; Mohammad Abdul Hamid
- Deputy Speaker: Mohammad Abdul Hamid; Ali Ashraf
- Leader of the House: Sheikh Hasina
- Leader of the Opposition: Khaleda Zia

The following is a list of Members of Parliament (MPs) elected to the Jatiya Sangsad (National Parliament of Bangladesh) from 300 Bangladeshi constituencies for the 7th Parliament of Bangladesh.

The list includes both MPs elected at the June 1996 general election, held on 12 June 1996. Nominated women's members for reserved seat and Those subsequently elected in by-elections.

== Members ==
=== Member of Parliament ===
Constituency		Name	Party	Other Responsibilities
1	Panchagarh-1	Muhammad Jamiruddin Sircar	BNP	
2	Panchagarh-2	Mozahar Hossain	BNP	
3	Thakurgaon-1	Khademul Islam Died: 17 December 1996	AL	
3	Thakurgaon-1	Ramesh Chandra Sen By-election: February 1997	AL	
4	Thakurgaon-2	Dabirul Islam	AL	
5	Thakurgaon-3	Emdadul Haque	AL	
6	Dinajpur-1	Abdur Rauf Chowdhury	AL	State Minister of Posts and Telecommunication (1999–2001)
7	Dinajpur-2	Satish Chandra Roy	AL	State Minister of Fisheries and Livestock (1996–1998); State Minister of Department of Primary and Mass Education (1998–2001)
8	Dinajpur-3	Khurshid Jahan Haq	BNP	
9	Dinajpur-4	Mizanur Rahman Manu	AL	
10	Dinajpur-5	Mostafizur Rahman Fizar	AL	
11	Dinajpur-6	Mostafizur Rahman Fizu	AL	
12	Nilphamari-1	NK Alam Chowdhury	JP	
13	Nilphamari-2	Ahsan Ahmed	JP	
14	Nilphamari-3	Mizanur Rahman Chowdhury	Jamaat-e-Islami	
15	Nilphamari-4	Asadur Rahman	JP	
16	Lalmonirhat-1	Joynal Abedin Sarker	JP	
17	Lalmonirhat-2	Mujibur Rahman	JP	
18	Lalmonirhat-3	Ghulam Muhammed Quader	JP	
19	Rangpur-1	Sharfuddin Ahmed Jhantu	JP	
20	Rangpur-2	Anisul Haque Chowdhury By-election: September 1996	AL	State Minister of Communication (1999–2001)
21	Rangpur-3	Hussain Muhammad Ershad	JP	
22	Rangpur-4	Karim Uddin Bharsha	JP	
23	Rangpur-5	H. N. Ashequr Rahman By-election: September 1996	AL	State Minister of Environment and Forest (1999–2001)
24	Rangpur-6	Nur Mohammad Mondal By-election: September 1996	JP	
25	Kurigram-1	A.K.M. Mostafizur Rahman	JP	
26	Kurigram-2	Tajul Islam Choudhury	JP	
27	Kurigram-3	Mozammel Hossain Lalu By-election: September 1996	JP	
28	Kurigram-4	Golam Hossain	JP	
29	Gaibandha-1	Md. Waheduzzaman Sarkar	JP	
30	Gaibandha-2	Abdur Rashid Sarkar	JP	
31	Gaibandha-3	Fazle Rabbi Chowdhury	JP	
32	Gaibandha-4	Lutfar Rahman Chowdhury	JP	
33	Gaibandha-5	Fazle Rabbi Miah	JP	
34	Joypurhat-1	Abdul Alim	BNP	
35	Joypurhat-2	Abu Yusuf Mohammad Khalilur Rahman	BNP	
36	Bogra-1	Habibur Rahman	BNP	
37	Bogra-2	A. K. M. Hafizur Rahman	BNP	
38	Bogra-3	Abdul Majid Talukdar	BNP	
39	Bogra-4	Ziaul Haque Mollah	BNP	
40	Bogra-5	Golam Mohammad Siraj	BNP	
41	Bogra-6	Md. Zahurul Islam By-election: September 1996	BNP	
42	Bogra-7	Helaluzzaman Talukder Lalu By-election: September 1996	BNP	
43	Nawabganj-1	Shahjahan Miah	BNP	
44	Nawabganj-2	Syed Monjur Hossain	BNP	
45	Nawabganj-3	Harunur Rashid	BNP	
46	Naogaon-1	Salek Chowdhury	BNP	
47	Naogaon-2	Shamsuzzoha Khan	BNP	
48	Naogaon-3	Akhtar Hameed Siddiqui	BNP	
49	Naogaon-4	Shamsul Alam Pramanik	BNP	
50	Naogaon-5	Shamsuddin Ahmed	BNP	
51	Naogaon-6	Alamgir Kabir	BNP	
52	Rajshahi-1	Aminul Haque	BNP	
53	Rajshahi-2	Kabir Hossain	BNP	
54	Rajshahi-3	Abu Hena	BNP	
55	Rajshahi-4	Nadim Mostafa	BNP	
56	Rajshahi-5	Md. Alauddin Expelled from BNP & seat vacant: 11 October 1999; By-election (Re-elected) from Awami League: December 1999; Died: 26 February 2000	BNP	State Minister of Water Resources (1998–1999)
56	Rajshahi-5	Md. Alauddin Expelled from BNP & seat vacant: 11 October 1999; By-election (Re-elected) from Awami League: December 1999; Died: 26 February 2000	AL	State Minister of Housing and Public Works (1999–2000)
56	Rajshahi-5	Raihanul Haque By-election: 2000	AL	
57	Natore-1	Fazlur Rahman Potol	BNP	
58	Natore-2	Ruhul Quddus Talukdar	BNP	
59	Natore-3	Kazi Golam Morshed	BNP	
60	Natore-4	Md. Abdul Quddus	AL	State Minister of Fisheries and Livestock (1999–2001)
61	Sirajganj-1	Mohammad Selim By-election: September 1996	AL	
62	Sirajganj-2	Mohammad Nasim	AL	Minister of Posts and Telecommunication (1996–2001); Minister of Housing and Public Works (1997–1999); Minister of Home Affairs (1999–2001)
63	Sirajganj-3	Abdul Mannan Talukder	BNP	
64	Sirajganj-4	Abdul Latif Mirza	AL	
65	Sirajganj-5	Abdul Latif Biswas	AL	
66	Sirajganj-6	Md. Shahjahan	AL	
67	Sirajganj-7	Hashibur Rahman Swapon Expelled from BNP & seat vacant: 1998	BNP	Deputy Minister of Industries (1998)
67	Sirajganj-7	Choyon Islam By-election: 1998	Independent	
68	Pabna-1	Abu Sayeed	AL	State Minister of Information (1996–2001)
69	Pabna-2	Ahmed Tafiz Uddin Died: June 1998	AL	
69	Pabna-2	Abdul Karim Khandaker	AL	
70	Pabna-3	Wazi Uddin Khan	AL	
71	Pabna-4	Shamsur Rahman Sherif	AL	
72	Pabna-5	Rafiqul Islam Bakul Died: 10 November 2000	BNP	
72	Pabna-5	Mazhar Ali Qadri By-election: 2000	AL	
73	Meherpur-1	Ahammad Ali Died: 14 April 1999	BNP	
73	Meherpur-1	Abdul Mannan By-election: May 1999	AL	
74	Meherpur-2	Mokbul Hossain	Independent	
75	Kushtia-1	Ahsanul Haq Mollah	BNP	
76	Kushtia-2	Shahidul Islam	BNP	
77	Kushtia-3	K M Abdul Khaleq Chontu	BNP	
78	Kushtia-4	Syed Mehedi Ahmed Rumi	BNP	
79	Chuadanga-1	Shamsuzzaman Dudu	BNP	
80	Chuadanga-2	Mozammel Haque	BNP	
81	Jhenaidah-1	Abdul Wahab	BNP	
82	Jhenaidah-2	Mashiur Rahman	BNP	
83	Jhenaidah-3	Shahidul Islam Master	BNP	
84	Jhenaidah-4	Shahiduzzaman Beltu	BNP	
85	Jessore-1	Tabibar Rahman Sarder	AL	
86	Jessore-2	Rafiqul Islam	AL	State Minister of Power, Energy and Mineral Resources (1997–2001)
87	Jessore-3	Ali Reza Raju	AL	
88	Jessore-4	Shah Hadiuzzaman	AL	
89	Jessore-5	Khan Tipu Sultan	AL	
90	Jessore-6	ASHK Sadek	AL	Minister of Education (1996–2001); Minister of Department of Primary and Mass Education (1996–2001); Minister of Science and Technology (1996–1998)
91	Magura-1	Muhammad Serajul Akbar	AL	
92	Magura-2	Biren Sikder	AL	
93	Narail-1	Dhirendra Nath Saha	AL	
94	Narail-2	Sharif Khasruzzaman	AL	
95	Bagerhat-1	Sheikh Helal By-election: September 1996	AL	
96	Bagerhat-2	Mir Shakawat Ali Daru	AL	
97	Bagerhat-3	Talukder Abdul Khaleque	AL	State Minister of Disaster Management and Relief (1997–2001)
98	Bagerhat-4	Mozammel Hossain	AL	State Minister of Social Welfare (1996–2001); State Minister of Women and Children Affairs (1996–1998)
99	Khulna-1	Panchanan Biswas By-election: September 1996	Independent	
100	Khulna-2	Sheikh Razzak Ali	BNP	
101	Khulna-3	Kazi Sekendar Ali Dalim	AL	
102	Khulna-4	Mostafa Rashidi Suja	AL	
103	Khulna-5	Salahuddin Yusuf Died: 6 October 2000	AL	Minister of Health and Family Welfare (1996–1999); Minister of Without Portfolio (1999–2000)
103	Khulna-5	Narayon Chandra Chanda By-election: December 2000	AL	
104	Khulna-6	Sheikh Md. Nurul Haque	AL	
105	Satkhira-1	Syed Kamal Bakht Assassinated: 1999	AL	
105	Satkhira-1	BM Nazrul Islam By-election: 1999	AL	
106	Satkhira-2	Kazi Shamsur Rahman	Jamaat-e-Islami	
107	Satkhira-3	S. M. Mokhlesur Rahman	AL	
108	Satkhira-4	Shahadat Hossain	JP	
109	Shatkhira-5	AK Fazlul Haque	AL	
110	Barguna-1	Dhirendra Debnath Shambhu	AL	Deputy Minister of Shipping (1997); Deputy Minister of Food (1997–2001)
111	Barguna-2	Golam Sarwar Hiru	IOJ	
112	Barguna-3	Mujibur Rahman Talukder	AL	
113	Patuakhali-1	Shahjahan Mia	AL	
114	Patuakhali-2	A. S. M. Feroz	AL	
115	Patuakhali-3	AKM Jahangir Hossain	AL	State Minister of Textiles (1997–2001)
116	Patuakhali-4	Anwarul Islam	AL	
117	Bhola-1	Vacant		
118	Bhola-2	Tofail Ahmed	AL	Minister of Industries (1996–2001); Minister of Commerce (1996–1999)
119	Bhola-3	Hafizuddin Ahmed	BNP	
120	Bhola-4	Nazimuddin Alam	BNP	
121	Barisal-1	Abul Hasanat Abdullah	AL	Chief Whip of Jatiya Sangsad (1996–2001)
122	Barisal-2	Golam Faruque Ovi	JP	
123	Barisal-3	Mosharraf Hossain Mongu	BNP	
124	Barisal-4	Shah Mohammad Abul Hossain	BNP	
125	Barisal-5	Nasim Biswas Died: 12 March 1998	BNP	
125	Barisal-5	Majibur Rahman Sarwar By-election: 1998	BNP	
126	Barisal-6	Syed Masud Reza	AL	
127	Jhalokati-1	Anwar Hossain Manju	JP	Minister of Communication (1996–2001)
128	Jhalokati-2	Zulfiker Ali Bhutto Died: 29 May 2000	JP	
128	Jhalokati-2	Amir Hossain Amu By-election: July 2000	AL	Minister of Food (Note: Before becoming MP) (1999–2001)
129	Pirojpur-1	Delwar Hossain Sayeedi	Jamaat-e-Islami	
130	Pirojpur-2	Tasmima Hossain By-election: September 1996	JP	
131	Pirojpur-3	Md. Rustum Ali Faraji	JP	
132	Pirojpur with Barisal	A. K. Faezul Huq	AL	State Minister of Jute (1997–2001); State Minister of Textiles (1996–1997)
133	Tangail-1	Abul Hasan Chowdhury	AL	State Minister of Foreign Affairs (1996–2001)
134	Tangail-2	Khandaker Asaduzzaman	AL	
135	Tangail-3	Lutfor Rahman Khan Azad	BNP	
136	Tangail-4	Abdul Latif Siddiqui	AL	
137	Tangail-5	Abdul Mannan	AL	
138	Tangail-6	Gautam Chakroborty	BNP	
139	Tangail-7	Abul Kalam Azad Siddiqui	BNP	
140	Tangail-8	Abdul Kader Siddique Resigned from Awami League: 1999	AL	
140	Tangail-8	Shawkat Momen Shahjahan By-election: November 1999	AL	
141	Jamalpur-1	Abul Kalam Azad	AL	
142	Jamalpur-2	Rashed Mosharraf	AL	State Minister of Land (1996–2001)
143	Jamalpur-3	Mirza Azam	AL	
144	Jamalpur-4	Md. Nurul Islam	AL	State Minister of Religious Affairs (1996–2001)
145	Jamalpur-5	Rezaul Karim Hira	AL	
146	Sherpur-1	Md. Atiur Rahman Atik	AL	
147	Sherpur-2	Matia Chowdhury	AL	Minister of Agriculture (1996–2001); Minister of Food (1996–1999); Minister of Disaster Management and Relief (1996–1997)
148	Sherpur-3	M. A. Bari	AL	
149	Mymensingh-1	Afzal H. Khan	BNP	
150	Mymensingh-2	Md. Shamsul Haque	AL	
151	Mymensingh-3	AFM Nazmul Huda	BNP	
152	Mymensingh-4	Rowshan Ershad	JP	
153	Mymensingh-5	A. K. M. Mosharraf Hossain	BNP	
154	Mymensingh-6	Moslem Uddin	AL	
155	Mymensingh-7	Ruhul Amin Madani	AL	
156	Mymensingh-8	Abdus Sattar	AL	
157	Mymensingh-9	Abdus Salam	AL	
158	Mymensingh-10	Altaf Hossain Golandaz	AL	
159	Mymensingh-11	Mohammed Amanullah	AL	State Minister of Health and Family Welfare (1997–2001)
160	Mymensingh with Netrokona	Mohammad Ali	BNP	
161	Netrokona-1	Jalal Uddin Talukder	AL	
162	Netrokona-2	Fazlur Rahman Khan	AL	
163	Netrokona-3	Nurul Amin Talukdar	BNP	
164	Netrokona-4	Abdul Momin	AL	
165	Kishoreganj-1	A. K. M. Shamsul Haque Died: 25 September 1999	AL	
165	Kishoreganj-1	Alauddin Ahammad By-election: 1999	AL	
166	Kishoreganj-2	Akhtaruzzaman Ranjan	BNP	
167	Kishoreganj-3	Sayed Ashraful Islam	AL	State Minister of Civil Aviation and Tourism (2000–2001)
168	Kishoreganj-4	Mizanul Haque	AL	
169	Kishoreganj-5	Mohammad Abdul Hamid	AL	Deputy Speaker of Jatiya Sangsad (1996–2001); Speaker of Jatiya Sangsad (2001)
170	Kishoreganj-6	Mujibur Rahman Monju	BNP	
171	Kishoreganj-7	Mohammed Zillur Rahman	AL	Minister of Local Government, Rural Development and Co-operatives (1996–1999); Minister of Local Government Division (1999–2001); Deputy House Leader of Jatiya Sangsad (1996–2001)
172	Manikganj-1	Khandaker Delwar Hossain	BNP	Opposition Chief Whip of Jatiya Sangsad (1996–2001)
173	Manikganj-2	Harunur Rashid Khan Monno	BNP	
174	Manikganj-3	Nizam Uddin Khan Died: 15 October 1996	BNP	
174	Manikganj-3	Abdul Wahab Khan By-election: 1996	BNP	
175	Manikganj-4	Shamsul Islam Khan	BNP	
176	Munshiganj-1	A. Q. M. Badruddoza Chowdhury	BNP	Deputy Opposition Leader of Jatiya Sangsad (1996–2001)
177	Munshiganj-2	Mizanur Rahman Sinha	BNP	
178	Munshiganj-3	Shamsul Islam	BNP	
179	Munshiganj-4	Md. Abdul Hai	BNP	
180	Dhaka-1	Nazmul Huda	BNP	
181	Dhaka-2	Abdul Mannan	BNP	
182	Dhaka-3	Amanullah Aman	BNP	
183	Dhaka-4	Habibur Rahman Mollah	AL	
184	Dhaka-5	A.K.M. Rahmatullah	AL	
185	Dhaka-6	Saber Hossain Chowdhury	AL	Deputy Minister of Shipping (1997–1998); Deputy Minister of Local Government, Rural Development and Co-operatives (1998–2001)
186	Dhaka-7	Sadeque Hossain Khoka	BNP	
187	Dhaka-8	Haji Mohammad Salim	AL	
188	Dhaka-9	Mokbul Hossain	AL	
189	Dhaka-10	HBM Iqbal	AL	
190	Dhaka-11	Kamal Ahmed Majumder	AL	
191	Dhaka-12	Dewan Md. Salauddin	BNP	
192	Dhaka-13	Ziaur Rahman Khan	BNP	
193	Gazipur-1	Md. Rahamat Ali	AL	State Minister of Rural Development and Co-operatives Division (1999–2001)
194	Gazipur-2	Ahsanullah Master	AL	
195	Gazipur-3	Akhtaruzzaman	AL	
196	Gazipur-4	Afsaruddin Ahmad Khan	AL	State Minister of Housing and Public Works (1996–1997)
197	Narsingdi-1	Shamsuddin Ahmed Ishaq	BNP	
198	Narsingdi-2	Abdul Moyeen Khan	BNP	
199	Narsingdi-3	Abdul Mannan Bhuiyan	BNP	
200	Narsingdi-4	Nuruddin Khan	AL	Minister of Power, Energy and Mineral Resources (1996–1998); Minister of Without Portfolio (1998); Minister of Science and Technology (1998–2001)
201	Narsingdi-5	Rajiuddin Ahmed Raju	AL	
202	Narayanganj-1	K. M. Shafiullah	AL	
203	Narayanganj-2	Emdadul Haque Bhuiyan	AL	
204	Narayanganj-3	Rezaul Karim Mannan	BNP	
205	Narayanganj-4	Shamim Osman	AL	
206	Narayanganj-5	S. M. Akram	AL	
207	Rajbari-1	Kazi Keramat Ali	AL	
208	Rajbari-2	Md. Zillul Hakim	AL	
209	Faridpur-1	Kazi Sirajul Islam	AL	
210	Faridpur-2	KM Obaidur Rahman	BNP	
211	Faridpur-3	Chowdhury Kamal Ibne Yusuf	BNP	
212	Faridpur-4	Mosharraf Hossain Died: 19 August 1999	AL	
212	Faridpur-4	Saleha Mosharraf By-election: October 1999	AL	
213	Faridpur-5	Qazi Abu Yusuf	AL	
214	Gopalganj-1	Faruk Khan	AL	
215	Gopalganj-2	Sheikh Fazlur Karim Selim	AL	Minister of Health and Family Welfare (1999–2001)
216	Gopalganj-3	Sheikh Hasina	AL	Prime Minister of Bangladesh (1996–2001); House Leader of Jatiya Sangsad (1996–2001)
217	Madaripur-1	Noor-E-Alam Chowdhury Liton	AL	
218	Madaripur-2	Shajahan Khan	AL	
219	Madaripur-3	Syed Abul Hossain	AL	State Minister of Local Government, Rural Development and Co-operatives (1996–1997)
220	Shariatpur-1	Master Majibur Rahman	AL	
221	Shariatpur-2	Shawkat Ali	AL	
222	Shariatpur-3	Abdur Razzaq	AL	Minister of Water Resources (1996–2001)
223	Sunamganj-1	Syed Rafiqul Haque	AL	
224	Sunamganj-2	Nasir Uddin Chowdhury	JP	
225	Sunamganj-3	Abdus Samad Azad	AL	Minister of Foreign Affairs (1996–2001)
226	Sunamganj-4	Fazlul Haque Aspia	BNP	
227	Sunamganj-5	Mohibur Rahman Manik	AL	
228	Sylhet-1	Humayun Rashid Choudhury Died: 10 July 2001	AL	Speaker of Jatiya Sangsad (1996–2001)
229	Sylhet-2	Shah Azizur Rahman	AL	
230	Sylhet-3	Abdul Mukit Khan	JP	
231	Sylhet-4	Imran Ahmad By-election: September 1996	AL	
232	Sylhet-5	Hafiz Ahmed Mazumder	AL	
233	Sylhet-6	Nurul Islam Nahid	AL	
234	Moulvibazar-1	Md. Shahab Uddin	AL	
235	Moulvibazar-2	Sultan Mohammad Mansur Ahmed	AL	
236	Moulvibazar-3	Saifur Rahman	BNP	
237	Moulvibazar-4	Md. Abdus Shahid	AL	
238	Habiganj-1	Dewan Farid Gazi	AL	
239	Habiganj-2	Sharif Uddin Ahmed Died: 6 August 1996	AL	
239	Habiganj-2	Suranjit Sengupta By-election: October 1996	AL	
240	Habiganj-3	Abu Lais Md. Mubin Chowdhury	JP	
241	Habiganj-4	Enamul Haque Mostafa Shahid	AL	
242	Brahmanbaria-1	Mohammad Sayedul Haque	AL	
243	Brahmanbaria-2	Abdus Sattar Bhuiyan	BNP	
244	Brahmanbaria-3	Haroon Al Rashid	BNP	
245	Brahmanbaria-4	Mohammad Shah Alam	AL	
246	Brahmanbaria-5	Abdul Latif	AL	
247	Brahmanbaria-6	A. B. Tajul Islam	AL	
248	Comilla-1	M. K. Anwar	BNP	
249	Comilla-2	Khandaker Mosharraf Hossain	BNP	
250	Comilla-3	Kazi Shah Mofazzal Hossain Kaikobad	JP	
251	Comilla-4	Manjurul Ahsan Munshi	BNP	
252	Comilla-5	Abdul Matin Khasru	AL	Minister of Law, Justice and Parliamentary Affairs (Note: He was serving as a state minister (1996-1997)) (1996–2001)
253	Comilla-6	Ali Ashraf	AL	Deputy Speaker of Jatiya Sangsad (2001)
254	Comilla-7	Abdul Hakim	AL	
255	Comilla-8	Akbar Hossain	BNP	
256	Comilla-9	A. H. M. Mustafa Kamal	AL	
257	Comilla-10	Md Tazul Islam	AL	
258	Comilla-11	Md. Joynal Abedin Bhuiyan	AL	
259	Comilla-12	Mujibul Haque Mujib	AL	
260	Chandpur-1	A. N. M. Ehsanul Hoque Milan	BNP	
261	Chandpur-2	Mofazzal Hossain Chowdhury	AL	State Minister of Local Government, Rural Development and Co-operatives (1997–1998); State Minister of Shipping (1998–2001)
262	Chandpur-3	G. M. Fazlul Haque	BNP	
263	Chandpur-4	Mohammad Abdullah	BNP	
264	Chandpur-5	Rafiqul Islam	AL	Minister of Home Affairs (1996–1999); Minister of Without Portfolio (1999–2000)
265	Chandpur-6	Alamgir Hyder Khan	BNP	
266	Feni-1	Begum Khaleda Zia	BNP	Opposition Leader of Jatiya Sangsad (1996–2001)
267	Feni-2	Joynal Hazari	AL	
268	Feni-3	Mosharraf Hossain	BNP	
269	Noakhali-1	Zainul Abdin Farroque	BNP	
270	Noakhali-2	Barkat Ullah Bulu	BNP	
271	Noakhali-3	Mahbubur Rahman	BNP	
272	Noakhali-4	Md. Shahjahan	BNP	
273	Noakhali-5	Obaidul Quader	AL	State Minister of Youth and Sports (1996–2001); State Minister of Cultural Affairs (1996–2001)
274	Noakhali-6	Mohammad Fazlul Azim	BNP	
275	Lakshmipur-1	Ziaul Haque Zia	BNP	
276	Lakshmipur-2	Harunur Rashid By-election: September 1996	AL	
277	Lakshmipur-3	Khairul Enam	BNP	
278	Lakshmipur-4	A. S. M. Abdur Rab	JSD	Minister of Shipping (1996–1998); Minister of Fisheries and Livestock (1998–2001)
279	Chittagong-1	Engineer Mosharraf Hossain By-election: September 1996	AL	Minister of Civil Aviation and Tourism (1997–2001); Minister of Housing and Public Works (1999–2001)
280	Chittagong-2	ABM Abul Kashem	AL	
281	Chittagong-3	Alhaz Mustafizur Rahman	AL	
282	Chittagong-4	Rafiqul Anwar	AL	
283	Chittagong-5	Syed Wahidul Alam	BNP	
284	Chittagong-6	Giasuddin Quader Chowdhury	BNP	
285	Chittagong-7	Salahuddin Quader Chowdhury	BNP	
286	Chittagong-8	Amir Khasru Mahmud Chowdhury	BNP	
287	Chittagong-9	M. A. Manan	AL	Minister of Labor and Manpower (Note: He was serving as a state minister (1996-1997)) (1996–2001)
288	Chittagong-10	Morshed Khan	BNP	
289	Chittagong-11	Gazi Shahjahan Jwel	BNP	
290	Chittagong-12	Sarwar Jamal Nizam	BNP	
291	Chittagong-13	Mamtaz Begum By-election: September 1996	BNP	
292	Chittagong-14	Oli Ahmad	BNP	
293	Chittagong-15	Jafrul Islam Chowdhury	BNP	
294	Cox's Bazar-1	Salahuddin Ahmed	BNP	
295	Cox's Bazar-2	Alamgir Mohammad Mahfuzullah Farid	BNP	
296	Cox's Bazar-3	Mohammad Khalequzzaman	BNP	
297	Cox's Bazar-4	Mohammad Ali	AL	
298	Khagrachari	Kalparanjan Chakma	AL	Minister of Without Portfolio (1997–1998); Minister of Chattogram Hill Tracts Affairs (1998–2001)
299	Rangamati	Dipankar Talukdar	AL	
300	Bandarban	Bir Bahadur Ushwe Sing	AL	

=== Members of Reserved Women's Seat ===
Women's Seat		Name	Political Party	Other Responsibilities
301	Women's Seat-1	Bharati Nandi Sarkar	AL	
302	Women's Seat-2	Farida Rauf Asha	AL	
303	Women's Seat-3	Shahnaz Sardar	AL	
304	Women's Seat-4	Kamrun Nahar Putul	AL	
305	Women's Seat-5	Jannatul Ferdous	AL	
306	Women's Seat-6	Zinnatunnessa Talukdar	AL	State Minister of Department of Primary and Mass Education (Note: She was serving as a deputy minister (1997)) (1997–1998); State Minister of Women and Children Affairs (1998–2001)
307	Women's Seat-7	Shaheen Monwara Haque	AL	
308	Women's Seat-8	Anjuman Ara Jamil	AL	
309	Women's Seat-9	Rehana Akter Hira	AL	
310	Women's Seat-10	Aleya Afroz	AL	
311	Women's Seat-11	Monnujan Sufian	AL	
312	Women's Seat-12	Nargis Ara Haque	AL	
313	Women's Seat-13	Mahmuda Saugat	AL	
314	Women's Seat-14	Chitra Bhattacharya	AL	
315	Women's Seat-15	Tahura Ali	AL	
316	Women's Seat-16	Jahanara Khan	AL	
317	Women's Seat-17	Sabita Begum	JP	
318	Women's Seat-18	Maryam Begum	AL	
319	Women's Seat-19	Rabia Bhuiyan	JP	
320	Women's Seat-20	Meher Afroz Chumki	AL	
321	Women's Seat-21	Sagufta Yasmin Emily	AL	
322	Women's Seat-22	Syeda Sajeda Chowdhury	AL	Minister of Environment and Forest (1997–2001)
323	Women's Seat-23	Khaleda Khanam	AL	
324	Women's Seat-24	Syeda Jebunnesa Haque	AL	
325	Women's Seat-25	Hosne Ara Wahid	AL	
326	Women's Seat-26	Dilara Harun	AL	
327	Women's Seat-27	Panna Kaiser	AL	
328	Women's Seat-28	Razia Matin Chowdhury	AL	
329	Women's Seat-29	Zeenat Mosharraf	JP	
330	Women's Seat-30	Aye Thein Rakhaine	AL	
