= Taluqdar (surname) =

Talukdar is a historic occupational title in South Asia (predominantly Bengal) which is now used as a surname. Notable people with the surname include:

== Talukdar ==
- Abdul Hady Talukdar (1905-1985), Bangladeshi academic administrator
- Abdul Jabbar Talukdar, politician from Barisal
- Abdul Majid Talukdar, former MP of Bogra-3
- Abdul Momin Talukdar (1929-1995), lawyer and former Deputy Minister of Local Government, Rural Development and Co-operatives
- Amartya Talukdar, men's rights activist
- Amjad Hossain Talukdar, former MP of Kurigram-3
- Anwar Jung Talukdar (died 1986), former MP of Dhaka-18
- Anwarul Kabir Talukdar (1944-2020), former Bangladeshi Minister of Power
- Bhomita Talukdar, Assamese terrorist
- Dipankar Talukdar (born 1952), former Minister of Chittagong Hill Tracts Affairs
- Fazlul Haque Talukdar, politician from Barisal
- Hatem Ali Talukdar, former MP of Tangail-2
- Jahangir Alam Talukdar (born 1968), Bangladeshi cricketer
- Jayanta Talukdar (born 1986), archer from Assam
- Jony Talukdar (born 1993), Bangladeshi cricketer
- Keramat Ali Talukdar, politician from Mymensingh
- Mahbub Talukdar (born 1942), Bangladeshi poet and civil servant
- Manoranjan Talukdar, Marxist from Assam
- Motahar Hossain Talukdar (1922-2001), activist for the Bengali language movement
- Motiur Rahman Talukdar, politician from Barguna
- Mrigen Talukdar, cricketer from Assam
- Murad Hasan Talukdar, Bangladeshi politician
- Nurul Amin Talukdar, Sector No. 11 commander for Bangladesh
- Phanidhar Talukdar, former MLA of Bhabanipur, Assam
- Pranita Talukdar (1935-2019), former MLA of Sorbhog, Assam
- Rony Talukdar (born 1990), Bangladeshi first-class cricketer
- Ruhul Quddus Talukdar (born 1962), Bangladeshi lawyer
- Shashwati Talukdar, Indian academic-filmmaker based in New York
- Talukdar Towhid Jung Murad (born 1971), former MP of Dhaka-19
- Zinnatunnessa Talukdar, former Minister of Primary and Mass Education

== Talukder ==
- Abdul Hamid Talukder, former MP of Sirajganj-4
- Abdul Mannan Talukder, former MP of Sirajganj-3
- Abdul Momen Talukder (1952–2025), MP of Bogra-3
- Abdur Rouf Talukder (born 1964), senior secretary at the Bangladeshi Ministry of Finance
- Abdus Salam Talukder (1936–1999), former secretary-general of Bangladesh Nationalist Party
- Atowar Rahman Talukder, former MP of Rajshahi-6
- Hasan Ali Talukder, former MP of Bogra-3
- Helaluzzaman Talukder, former MP of Bogra-7
- Iftiquar Uddin Talukder Pintu, former MP of Netrokona-3
- Ishaque Hossain Talukder (died 2014), former MP of Sirajganj-3
- Ismail Hossain Talukder, former MP of Mymensingh-2
- Jahurul Islam Talukdar, former MP of Pabna-1
- Jalal Uddin Talukder (died 2012), politician from Netrokona
- Joly Talukder, general secretary of the Bangladesh Garment Workers Trade Union Centre
- Karimuzzaman Talukder, former MP of Jamalpur-3
- Kosiruddin Talukder (1899–1971), doctor murdered in the Bangladesh Liberation War
- Md. Abdul Mohit Talukder (born 1958), Bangladeshi politician, MP of Bogra-3
- Mofiz Uddin Talukder, former MP of Sirajganj-5
- Mujibur Rahman Talukder (died 2001), freedom fighter
- Nazir Ahmad Talukder, politician from Faridpur
- Nazrul Islam Talukder (born 1964), Judge of the High Court Division of Bangladesh Supreme Court
- Nurul Islam Talukder, MP of Bogra-3
- Nurul Islam Talukder, former MP of Sirajganj-6
- Parvin Talukder Maya, politician
- Rashid Talukder (1939–2011), photojournalist
- Ratan Talukder (born 1957), martial artist and actor
- Setara Talukdar, Jatiya Party politician
- Shahidul Alam Talukder, former MP of Patuakhali-2
- Talukder Abdul Khaleque (born 1952), two-time Mayor of Khulna
- Talukder Md.Yunus (born 1952), MP of Barisal-2
- Talukder Moniruzzaman (1938–2019), political scientist and National Professor
- Shahjahan Ali Talukder (1955-2020), former MP of Bogra-5
- Shamsul Haque Talukder, former MP of Tangail-2
- Sirajul Huq Talukder, former MP of Bogra-5
- Ushatan Talukder (born 1950), general secretary of the Parbatya Chattagram Jana Samhati Samiti

== Taluqdar ==
- Haji Shariatullah Taluqdar (1781–1840), religious leader and founder of the Faraizi movement
- Iqbal Hassan Mahmood Taluqdar, Minister of Power, Energy and Mineral Resources
- Muhsinuddin Ahmad Taluqdar (1819–1862), second leader of the Faraizi movement
- Taluqdar Abdullah al Mahmood (1900-1975), former Minister of Industries and Production

== See also ==
- Colvin Taluqdars' College, Lucknow, India
- Government Abdur Rashid Talukdar Degree College, Barisal, Bangladesh
