= Hira (surname) =

Hira is an Indian, Japanese, and Māori surname.

== Origins ==
As a Japanese surname, it is written with a kanji meaning "even", "flat", or "peace" (平); the same character is also used for the Japanese surname Taira as well as the Chinese surname spelled Píng in Hanyu Pinyin (reflecting the Standard Mandarin pronunciation). As an Indian name, it can also be spelled Heera, and originates from the Sanskrit word hīraka (हीरक) meaning "diamond". Hira is also a Māori surname.

== Statistics ==
Statistics compiled by Patrick Hanks on the basis of the 2011 United Kingdom census and the 2011 census of Ireland found 293 people with the surname Hira on the island of Great Britain and one on the island of Ireland. The 1881 United Kingdom census did not record any bearers of this surname. The 2010 United States census found 513 people with the surname Hira, making it the 42,308th-most-common name in the country. This represented an increase from 384 (51,024th-most-common) in the 2000 census. In both censuses, about eight-tenths of the bearers of the surname identified as Asian, while the proportion identifying as non-Hispanic white fell from 12% in the 2000 census to 6.4% in the 2010 census.

== People ==
- Farida Akhter Hira (fl. 2008–2014), Bangladeshi Awami League politician
- Hitesh Hira (born 1971), Zimbabwean cricketer
- Mikijirō Hira (平 幹二朗; 1933–2016), Japanese actor
- Mannan Hira (1956–2020), Bangladeshi dramatist
- Nari Hira (fl. 1980s–present), Indian publisher
- Rehana Akter Hira (fl. 1996–2001), Bangladeshi Awami League politician
- Rasheda Begum Hira (fl. 2009–2014), Bangladesh Nationalist Party politician
- Rezaul Karim Hira (রেজাউল করিম হীরা, born 1942), Bangladesh Awami League politician, Minister of Housing and Public Works
- Rhonda Hira (born 1965), New Zealand softball player
- Ronnie Hira (born 1987), New Zealand cricketer
- Ryuko Hira (比良 竜虎; born Kamalesh Punjabi, 1948), Indian-born Japanese hotelier
- Shuto Hira (平 秀斗; born 1994), Japanese footballer
- Takehiro Hira (平 岳大; born 1974), Japanese actor
