= Zerin =

Zerin may refer to:

- Zerin, an alternate spelling of Zir'in, a former Palestinian Arab village
  - Tel Jezreel, an archaeological site near Zir'in in the eastern Jezreel Valley in northern Israel sometimes referred to as Zerin
  - Yizre'el, a kibbutz in north-eastern Israel, located on the site of the former village of Zir'in
- Asma Zerin Jhumu, a Bangladesh Awami League politician
- ZERIN (organization) (Zentrum für Rieskrater- und Impaktforschung Nördlingen), a scientific institute for impact research and documentation of the Nördlinger Ries crater
- 121232 Zerin, a minor planet
- Mount Zerin, a mountain in Mesopotamia mentioned in The Book of Mormon that was removed when the brother of Jared commanded it in the name of the Lord
- Helen Zerin Khan (or Helen Jerin Khan), a Bangladeshi politician and former member of the Bangladesh Parliament
- Qalam Zerin, a mentorship and support program for university students run by Yazda
