= Jafar Ullah Chowdhury =

Bangladeshi politician (died 2010)

Member of Parliament for Bhola-4 Constituency
- In office 1992–1996
- Preceded by: M. M. Nazrul Islam
- Succeeded by: Nazim Uddin Alam

Personal details
- Born: Monpura, Bhola
- Died: January 20, 2010
- Party: Awami League
- Occupation: Businessman, Politician

Jafar Ullah Chowdhury was a Bangladeshi politician and a former Member of Parliament from Bhola-4 constituency.

== Biography ==
Jafar was born in Andir Para village, Monpura Upazila, Bhola District. His father was Hafiz Ullah Chowdhury, and his mother was Hindia Begum. After the death of M. M. Nazrul Islam, the then-MP for Bhola-4, on September 17, 1992, Zafar was elected MP in a by-election for this seat.

Jafar contested from the same constituency with the nomination of the Bangladesh Awami League in the June 1996 Bangladeshi general election but was defeated. He also ran as an independent candidate in the 2001 Bangladeshi general election but failed.

Jafar died on 20 January 2010, while undergoing treatment at Holy Family Red Crescent Medical College Hospital. He was buried at the Banani graveyard.
