= Saad Zagulul Faruk =

Bangladeshi politician (died 2003)

- সাদ জগলুল ফারুক

Member of Bangladesh Parliament
- In office 1986–1990
- Preceded by: Seats start
- Succeeded by: M. M. Nazrul Islam

Personal details
- Died: 27 February 2003
- Party: Jatiya Party (Ershad)

Saad Zagulul Faruk (died 27 February 2003) was a Jatiya Party (Ershad) politician and a member of parliament for Bhola-4.

== Career ==
Faruk was elected to parliament from Bhola-4 as a Jatiya Party candidate in 1986 and 1988.

== Death ==
Faruk died on 27 February 2003.
