= Khan Muhammad Saifullah Al Mehdi =

Bangladeshi politician

- খাঁন মুহাম্মদ সাইফুল্লাহ্‌ আল মেহেদী

Member of Parliament for Bogra-3
- In office 7 January 2024 – 6 August 2024
- Preceded by: Nurul Islam Talukder
- Succeeded by: Mosharraf Hossain

Personal details
- Born: 12 November 1988 (age 37) Daharpur, Bogra District, Bangladesh
- Party: Independent

Khan Muhammad Saifullah Al-Mehdi (born 12 November 1988), also known as Badhon, is a Bangladeshi politician. He is a former Jatiya Sangsad member representing the Bogra-3 constituency.

== Early life and family ==
Muhammad Saifullah Al-Mehdi was born on 12 November 1988 to a Bengali family of Khans in the village of Daharpur in Adamdighi thana, Bogra District, Bangladesh. His father, Sirajul Islam Khan Raju, was a five-term Union Council chairman, a two-term chairman of Adamdighi Upazila, and the current president of the Adamdighi Awami League. Al-Mehdi holds an LL.M..

== Career ==
Al-Mehdi was a former secretary of the youth and sports division of the Adamdighi Jubo League. He was elected to parliament from Bogra-3 as an independent candidate on 7 January 2024.
