= Azizul Haq Mollah =

Bangladesh Nationalist Party politician

Member of Bangladesh Parliament
- In office 1991–1996
- Preceded by: Mamdudur Rahman Chowdhury
- Succeeded by: Ziaul Haque Molla

Personal details
- Died: 1993
- Party: Bangladesh Nationalist Party
- Children: Ziaul Haque Molla

Azizul Haq Mollah (died 1993) was a Bangladesh Nationalist Party politician and a member of parliament for Bogra-4.

== Career ==
Mollah was elected to parliament from Bogra-4 as a Bangladesh Nationalist Party candidate in 1991. He died in 1993. His son, Ziaul Haque Mollah succeeded him in a by-election.
