= Md Abdul Bari =

Bangladeshi politician

- আব্দুল বারী
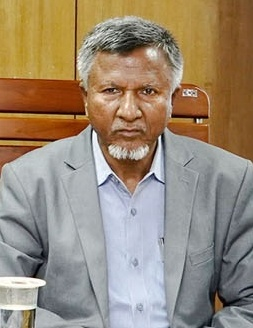
- Bari in 2026

Minister of State for Public Administration
- Incumbent
- Assumed office 17 February 2026
- Prime Minister: Tarique Rahman
- Preceded by: Farhad Hossain

Minister of State for Food
- Incumbent
- Assumed office 25 March 2026
- Prime Minister: Tarique Rahman
- Preceded by: Amin ur Rashid Yasin

Member of the Bangladesh Parliament for Joypurhat-2
- Incumbent
- Assumed office 17 February 2026
- Preceded by: Abu Sayeed Al Mahmood Swapon

Personal details
- Born: 1 February 1955 (age 71) Joypurhat, East Pakistan
- Party: Bangladesh Nationalist Party

Md Abdul Bari (born 1 February 1955) is a Bangladeshi politician affiliated with Bangladesh Nationalist Party. He is the incumbent Jatiya Sangsad member representing the Joypurhat-2 constituency and the incumbent State Minister of Public Administration since February 2026.
