= Helen Zerin Khan =

Bangladeshi politician

- হেলেন জেরিন খান
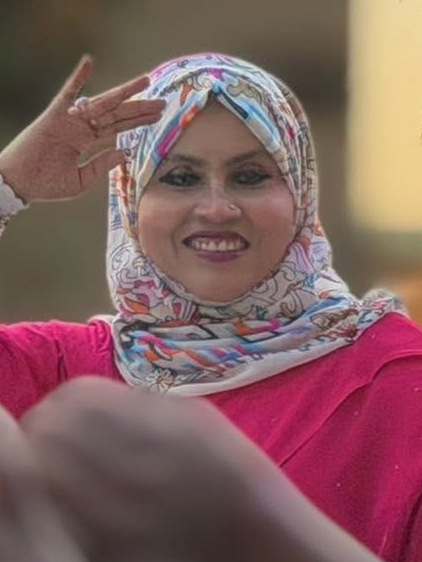
- Khan in 2026

Member of Parliament
- Incumbent
- Assumed office 3 May 2026
- Preceded by: Parvin Zaman Kalpana
- Constituency: Reserved Women's Seat–9
- In office 2 September 2005 – 27 October 2006
- Preceded by: Aye Thein Rakhaine
- Succeeded by: Shaheen Monwara Haque
- Constituency: Reserved Women's Seat–30

Personal details
- Born: Madaripur, Bangladesh
- Party: Bangladesh Nationalist Party

Helen Zerin Khan is a Bangladeshi politician and the incumbent Jatiya Sangsad member representing the reserved women's seat–9 of the Bangladesh Nationalist Party (BNP). She previously served as a Member of Parliament from 2004 to 2006. She currently serves as the Senior Joint Secretary of the Bangladesh Jatiotabadi Mohila Dal.

Khan was elected to the parliament again in 2026 as a reserved seat member nominated by the Bangladesh Nationalist Party.

== Early life and education ==
Helen Jerin Khan was born in Madaripur, Bangladesh into a politically active family. Her father and uncles were involved in politics, and her mother was a social worker.

Khan completed her secondary education at Charmugaria Girls' School in 1984. She later graduated from Eden Mohila College with a Bachelor of Arts (Honours) in Islamic History and Culture in 1993. She subsequently earned a master's degree in political science in 2010 and a Bachelor of Laws (LLB) degree in 2012.

== Political career ==
Khan began her political career during her student years. She served as vice-president of Bangladesh Jatiotabadi Chatra Dal and was also elected vice-president of Eden Mohila College.

Khan was elected to the Bangladesh Parliament in 2005 from a reserved women's seat as a Bangladesh Nationalist Party candidate.

In the 2008 general election, Khan contested the Madaripur-2 constituency and received 28,594 votes (13.17%).

During the period surrounding the 2014 general election, which was boycotted by major opposition parties including the BNP, Khan remained politically active.

In 2026, Khan was elected again to Parliament as a reserved seat member representing the Bangladesh Nationalist Party.

Khan has also remained active in party organisational activities, including events marking anniversaries of the Jatiotabadi Mohila Dal.

== Personal life ==
Khan has lived in Madaripur and Dhaka. She has one daughter and one son.
