= Md. Abdul Mohit Talukder =

Bangladeshi politician (born 1958)

Md. Abdul Mohit Talukder (born 31 October 1958) is a Bangladesh Nationalist Party politician and a current member of parliament for Bogra-3. His father, Abdul Majid Talukdar and brother Abdul Momen Talukder was also elected to parliament from Bogra-3.
