= A. K. M. Rezaul Karim Tansen =

Bangladeshi politician

- এ, কে, এম, রেজাউল করিম তানসেন

Member of the Bangladesh Parliament for Bogra-4
- In office 8 February 2023 – 6 August 2024
- Preceded by: Mosharraf Hossain
- In office 29 January 2014 – 28 January 2019
- Preceded by: Z. I. M. Mostofa Ali
- Succeeded by: Mosharraf Hossain

Personal details
- Born: 7 February 1953 (age 73) Bogra, East Bengal, Dominion of Pakistan
- Party: Jatiya Samajtantrik Dal

A. K. M. Rezaul Karim Tansen (born 7 February 1953) is a Bangladeshi politician and Jatiya Sangsad member representing the Bogra-4 constituency. He belongs to the Jatiya Samajtantrik Dal party.

== Early life ==
Tansen was born on 7 February 1953. He has a B.A. degree.

== Career ==
Tansen was elected to parliament on 5 January 2014 from Bogra-4 as a Bangladesh Awami League candidate. In 2023 by-election he won against his closest rival Hero Alom by a margin of 824 votes.
