= Kazi Rabbi Hasan =

Bangladeshi politician

Member of Bangladesh Parliament
- Preceded by: Md. Abdur Razzak Akand
- Succeeded by: Abu Yusuf Mohammad Khalilur Rahman

Personal details
- Party: Jatiya Party (Ershad)

Kazi Rabbi Hasan is a Jatiya Party (Ershad) politician in Bangladesh and a former member of parliament for Joypurhat-2.

== Career ==
Hasan was elected to parliament from Joypurhat-2 as a Jatiya Party candidate in 1988.
