= Golam Mawla =

Bangladeshi politician (1940–2019)

Member of Parliament for Bogra-3
- In office 15 February 1996 – 12 June 1996
- Preceded by: Abdul Majid Talukdar
- Succeeded by: Abdul Majid Talukdar

Personal details
- Born: 8 January 1940 Rajshahi, Bengal, British India
- Died: 10 April 2019 (aged 79) Dhaka, Bangladesh
- Party: Bangladesh Nationalist Party

Military service
- Allegiance: Pakistan (before 1973); Bangladesh
- Branch/service: Pakistan Army; Bangladesh Army
- Years of service: 1963 – 1995
- Rank: Major General
- Unit: Corps of Electrical Mechanical Engineers
- Commands: Commandant of 902nd Central Workshop; Military Secretary to President; Chairman of Bangladesh Rural Electrification Board; Quartermaster general at Army Headquarters
- Battles/wars: Indo-Pakistani war of 1965

Golam Mawla (8 January 1940 – 10 April 2019) was a Bangladeshi two star military officer and politician who was a member of parliament elected from the Bogra-3 constituency in February 1996.

== Early life and education ==
Mawla was born on 8 January 1940, in Rajshahi. He was the younger brother of former Justice Mohammad Gholam Rabbani. He obtained his B.Sc. in Electrical Engineering from the University of Engineering and Technology, Lahore, in the then West Pakistan.

== Career ==
=== Military career ===
Mawla enlisted in the Pakistan Military Academy in 1961 through the Electrical and Mechanical program and was commissioned in 1963 at the Corps of Electrical Mechanical Engineers. His initial parent unit was the 52nd EME Battalion, stationed at the then Quetta Cantonment, West Pakistan. At the eve of the Bangladesh Liberation War, he was promoted to the rank of major and was posted in Dacca Cantonment of then East Pakistan as the officer in charge of the 149th Infantry Workshop, but after the crackdown, he was sent to Saudi Arabia for training. On 13 December 1971, he was sent back to Pakistan and detained in Karachi Cantonment. He was repatriated to the Bangladesh Army in 1973. Mawla was then promoted to lieutenant colonel and served as the defence attaché at the embassy of Bangladesh in Saudi Arabia and then at the embassy of Bangladesh for Hong Kong as colonel. In 1989, Mawla was upgraded to the rank of brigadier general and appointed as the chairman of the Bangladesh Rural Electrification Board, which he tenured until 1991. He was later promoted to major general and designated as quartermaster general at Army Headquarters. On 9 September 1993, he was appointed as the military secretary to the president. He went on leave per retirement on 7 January 1995 while serving as the military secretary to the president.

=== Political career ===
Mawla was elected to parliament from Bogra-3 as a Bangladesh Nationalist Party candidate in the February 1996 Bangladeshi general election.

== Death ==
Mawla died on 10 April 2019, aged 79, at the Combined Military Hospital in Dhaka.
