= Mohammad Nurul Islam (politician) =

Bangladeshi politician

- মোহাম্মদ নুরুল ইসলাম

Member of the Bangladesh Parliament for Bhola-4
- Incumbent
- Assumed office 17 February 2026
- Preceded by: Abdullah Al Islam Jakob

Secretary General of the Bangladesh Jatiotabadi Jubodal
- Incumbent
- Assumed office 09 July 2024
- President: Abdul Monayem Munna
- Preceded by: Khandaker Delwar Hossain

Personal details
- Born: September 12, 1971 (age 54) Char Fasson Upazila, Bhola District
- Party: Bangladesh Nationalist Party

Mohammad Nurul Islam is a Bangladeshi politician of the Bangladesh Nationalist Party. He is currently serving as a member of parliament from Bhola-4.

== Early life ==
Islam was born on 12 September 1971 in Char Fasson Upazila in Bhola District.
