= Mamdudur Rahman Chowdhury =

Bangladeshi politician (1946–2018)

- মামদুদুর রহমান চৌধুরী

Minister of Shipping
- In office 1986–1990
- Preceded by: AKM Motiar Rahman
- Succeeded by: Azizul Haq Mollah

Member of Parliament from Bogra-4
- In office 1988–1990

Personal details
- Born: 1 January 1946 Bogra District
- Died: 4 April 2018 (aged 72) Dhaka
- Party: Jatiya Party (Ershad)

Mamdudur Rahman Chowdhury (1 January 1946 – 4 April 2018) was a Bangladeshi politician, minister of shipping and a member of parliament for Bogra-4.

== Early life ==
Mamdudur Rahman Chowdhury was born on 1 January 1946 in Bogra District. His father's name is Mahbubur Rahman Chowdhury (Putu) and his mother's name is Saira Khatun. His older sister Ismat Ara Sadique was the minister of state for public administration.

== Career ==
Chowdhury was the publisher and editor of the daily Sakal Ananda published from Bogra. He was elected to parliament from Bogra-4 as a Jatiya Party candidate in 1986 and 1988.

He was the deputy minister of communications in the Ershad government. After that he was the minister of state for relief, health and agriculture. He then served as the minister of shipping.

He joined the Bangladesh Nationalist Party after the fall of the Ershad government. He joined the Liberal Democratic Party (LDP) in 2007 and was a member of the presidium. On 4 January 2016, he left the LDP and formed a party called Bangladesh Janata Party and was the general secretary.

== Death ==
Mamdudur Rahman Chowdhury died on 4 April 2018.
