= AKM Motiar Rahman =

Bangladeshi politician

Member of Bangladesh Parliament
- In office 1979–1986
- Preceded by: Mozaffar Hossain (Bogra politician)
- Succeeded by: Mamdudur Rahman Chowdhury

Personal details
- Born: 1928 (age 97–98) Sudampur, Shibganj thana, British India
- Party: Bangladesh Nationalist Party

AKM Motiar Rahman is a Bangladesh Nationalist Party politician and the former member of parliament for Bogra-4.

== Biography ==
AKM Motiar Rahman was born in 1928 in Sudampur village of what is now Shibganj Upazila, Bogra, Bangladesh.

Rahman was elected to parliament from Bogra-4 as a Bangladesh Nationalist Party candidate in 1979.
