= Abu Sayeed Al Mahmood Swapon =

Bangladeshi politician

- আবু সাঈদ আল মাহমুদ স্বপন
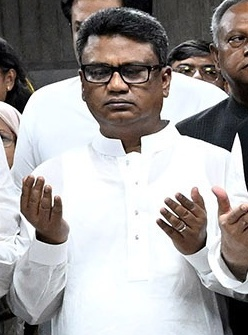
- Swapon in 2023

Member of Parliament for Joypurhat-2
- In office 5 January 2014 – 6 August 2024
- Preceded by: Golam Mostafa
- Succeeded by: Abu Sayeed Al Mahmood Swapon

Personal details
- Born: 21 September 1969 (age 56)
- Party: Bangladesh Awami League

Abu Sayeed Al Mahmood Swapon is a Bangladesh Awami League politician and a former Jatiya Sangsad member representing the Joypurhat-2 constituency.

== Early life ==
Swapon was born on 21 September 1969. He has B.A. and M.B.A. degrees.

== Career ==
Swapon was elected to Parliament on 5 January 2014 from Joypurhat-2 as a Bangladesh Awami League candidate. From 23 to 26 April 2018, he was the acting general secretary of the Bangladesh Awami League after Obaidul Quader left for a three-day trip to India.
