= ABM Shahjahan =

Bangladeshi politician (c.1948–2018)

State Minister - Ministry of Jute
- In office 1988–1990

Member of Parliament from Bogra-3
- In office 1986–1990
- Preceded by: Abdul Majid Talukdar
- Succeeded by: Abdul Majid Talukdar

Personal details
- Born: c. 1948 Bogra District
- Died: 8 May 2018 Dhaka
- Party: Jatiya Party (Ershad)
- Other political affiliations: Jatiya Samajtantrik Dal (Siraj)

ABM Shahjahan (c. 1948 – 8 May 2018) was a Jatiya Party (Ershad) politician and member of parliament for Bogra-3. He was an organizer of the Liberation War of Bangladesh.

== Career ==
Shahjahan was a founding member of the Jatiya Samajtantrik Dal (JSD) and general secretary of the central committee. He later joined the Jatiya Party and served as a presidium member and secretary general.

He was elected to parliament from Bogra-3 as a Jatiya Samajtantrik Dal (Siraj) candidate in 1986. He was elected to parliament from Bogra-3 as a Jatiya Party candidate in 1988. He is a former state minister.

He was the director of the board of Janata Bank Limited and the chairman of the board of directors of Rupali Bank Limited.

He lost the 5th Jatiya Sangsad elections of 1991, 7th Jatiya Sangsad elections of 12 June 1996 and the 8th Jatiya Sangsad of 2001 from the same constituency with the nomination of Jatiya Party.

== Death ==
Ahmed died on 8 May 2018.
