= Md. Abdur Razzak Akand =

Bangladeshi politician

Member of Bangladesh Parliament
- In office 1986–1988
- Succeeded by: Kazi Rabbi Hasan

Personal details
- Party: Bangladesh Awami League

Md. Abdur Razzak Akand is a Bangladesh Awami League politician and a former member of parliament for Joypurhat-2.

== Career ==
Akand was elected to parliament from Joypurhat-2 as a Bangladesh Awami League candidate in 1986.
