= Nurul Islam Talukder (Bogra politician) =

Bangladeshi Politician

- নূরুল ইসলাম তালুকদার

Member of Parliament for Bogra-3
- In office 29 January 2014 – 7 January 2024
- Preceded by: Abdul Momen Talukder
- Succeeded by: Khan Mohammad Saifullah Al Mehedi

Personal details
- Born: 1 July 1950 (age 76)
- Party: Jatiya Party (Ershad)

Nurul Islam Talukder (born 1 July 1950) is a Bangladeshi politician and former Jatiya Sangsad member representing the Bogra-3 constituency.

== Early life ==
Talukder was born on 1 July 1950. He has a L.L.B. degree.

== Career ==
Talukder was elected to the Jatiya Sangsad from Bogra-3 as a Jatiya Party candidate in 2014 and was re-elected in 2018.
