= Abdullah Al Islam Jakob =

Bangladeshi politician

- আব্দুল্লাহ আল ইসলাম জ্যাকব
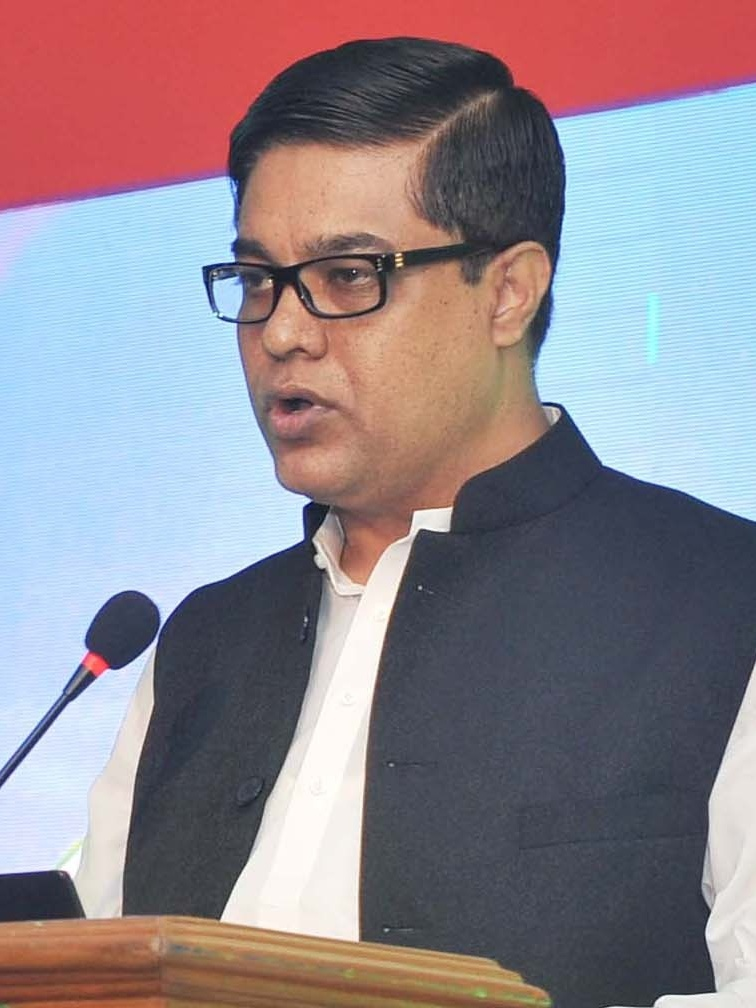
- Jakob in 2016

Deputy Minister of Environment, Forest and Climate Change
- In office 2014–2019
- Succeeded by: Habibun Nahar

Member of the Bangladesh Parliament for Bhola-4
- In office 25 January 2009 – 6 August 2024
- Preceded by: Nazimuddin Alam
- Succeeded by: Mohammad Nurul Islam

Personal details
- Born: 21 December 1972 (age 53) Bhola, Bangladesh
- Party: Awami League
- Parent: M. M. Nazrul Islam (father)

Abdullah Al Islam Jakob (born 21 December 1972) is a Bangladesh Awami League politician and a former chairman of the Standing Committee on Ministry of Youth and Sports and a former deputy Minister of Environment and Forest. He is a former Jatiya Sangsad member representing the Bhola-4 constituency during 2009–2024. His father M. M. Nazrul Islam was also a member of the Jatiya Sangsad.

== Early life ==
Jakob was born on 21 December 1972 in Char Fasson, Bhola District, Bangladesh.

== Career ==
Jakob was elected to parliament from Bhola-4 in 2014. He won at 11th Jatiya Sangsad general election, held on 30 December 2018. He built a 16-storey tower in Char Fasson, Bhola named Jakob Tower to promote tourism in Bhola.

Jakob was detained in October 2024 after the fall of the Sheikh Hasina led Awami League government. A Dhaka court has placed him on a three-day remand in connection with the shooting death of Shamim Howladar in the Rupnagar area of Dhaka.
