= Bhola-3 =

Constituency of Bangladesh's Jatiya Sangsad

Coordinates: 22.33°N 90.73°E

- Constituency for the Jatiya Sangsad
- District: Bhola District
- Division: Barisal Division
- Electorate: 388,550 (2026)

Current constituency
- Created: 1984
- Party: Bangladesh Nationalist Party
- Member: Hafiz Uddin Ahmad
- ← 116 Bhola-2 118 Bhola-4 →

Bhola-3 is a constituency represented in the Jatiya Sangsad (National Parliament) of Bangladesh since 2026 by Hafiz Uddin Ahmad of the Bangladesh Nationalist Party.

== Boundaries ==
The constituency encompasses Lalmohan and Tazumuddin upazilas.

== History ==
The constituency was created in 1984 from a Bakerganj constituency when the former Bakerganj District was split into four districts: Bhola, Bakerganj, Jhalokati, and Pirojpur.

== Members of Parliament ==
Election	Member	Party
1986	Hafiz Uddin Ahmad	Jatiya Party
1991	Hafiz Uddin Ahmad	Independent
Feb 1996	Hafiz Uddin Ahmad	Bangladesh Nationalist Party
2001	Hafiz Uddin Ahmad	Bangladesh Nationalist Party
2008	Mohammad Jashimuddin	Awami League
Apr 2010 by-election	Nurunnabi Chowdhury	Awami League
2014	Nurunnabi Chowdhury	Awami League
2018	Nurunnabi Chowdhury	Awami League
2024	Nurunnabi Chowdhury	Awami League
2026	Hafiz Uddin Ahmad	Bangladesh Nationalist Party

== Elections ==
=== Elections in the 2020s ===
General election 2026: Bhola-3
Party	Candidate	Votes	%	±%
BNP	Hafiz Uddin Ahmad	145,990		N/A
BDP	Md. Nizamul Haque	57,351		N/A
Majority		88,639		N/A
Turnout				N/A
Registered electors		388,550		
BNP gain from AL				

=== Elections in the 2010s ===
General Election 2018: Bhola-3
Party	Candidate	Votes	%	±%
AL	Nurunnabi Chowdhury	105,317	70.2	−24.8
BNP	Hafizuddin Ahmed	44,568	28.8	−2.4
Majority		105,257	70.2	−24.8
Turnout		149,885	69.7	−1.3

General Election 2014: Bhola-3
Party	Candidate	Votes	%	±%
AL	Nurunnabi Chowdhury	171,658	95.0	+26.2
JP(E)	AKM Nazrul Islam Mia	9,076	5.0	N/A
Majority		162,582	90.0	+52.5
Turnout		180,734	71.0	+3.9
AL hold				

In October 2009, the Supreme Court upheld a ruling that Major (retired) Jashim Uddin's 2008 candidacy was illegal because he failed to wait the statutory five years after compulsory retirement from government service before running for parliament. The Election Commission vacated the seat on February 3, 2010. Nurunnabi Chowdhury was elected in the resulting April 2010 by-election.

Bhola-3 by-election, April 2010 (Note: The Election Commission suspended voting at 9 of 86 polling places because of allegations of ballot box stuffing and other irregularities. The election turnout is for the remaining 77 polling stations; it excludes the 31,566 registered voters whose polling places were shut down.)
Party	Candidate	Votes	%	±%
AL	Nurunnabi Chowdhury	93,873	68.8	+16.0
BNP	Hafizuddin Ahmed	42,658	31.2	−14.5
Majority		51,215	37.5	+30.4
Turnout		136,531	67.1	−17.6
AL hold				

=== Elections in the 2000s ===
General Election 2008: Bhola-3
Party	Candidate	Votes	%	±%
AL	Mohammad Jashimuddin	96,034	52.8	+19.1
BNP	Hafizuddin Ahmed	83,123	45.7	−20.1
IAB	Md. Nurul Islam	1,639	0.9	N/A
Independent	Siddikur Rahman Manna	1,207	0.7	N/A
Majority		12,911	7.1	−25.0
Turnout		182,003	84.7	−25.6
AL gain from BNP				

General Election 2001: Bhola-3
Party	Candidate	Votes	%	±%
BNP	Hafizuddin Ahmed	98,659	65.8	+6.8
AL	Tofail Ahmed	50,588	33.7	−2.9
IJOF	AKM Nazrul Islam Mia	523	0.3	N/A
Jatiya Party (M)	Abdus Sattar	178	0.1	N/A
Majority		48,071	32.1	+9.8
Turnout		149,948	59.1	−11.7
BNP hold				

=== Elections in the 1990s ===
General Election June 1996: Bhola-3
Party	Candidate	Votes	%	±%
BNP	Hafizuddin Ahmed	70,843	59.0	+56.6
AL	AKM Nazrul Islam	44,007	36.6	+4.3
Jamaat	A. Shehabuddin	2,743	2.3	N/A
IOJ	Md. Nurul Islam	1,254	1.0	N/A
JP(E)	A. Sattar Alamgir	835	0.7	N/A
Gano Forum	Md. Feroj Kibria Kishore	438	0.4	N/A
Majority		26,836	22.3	+9.6
Turnout		120,120	70.8	+29.1
BNP gain from Independent				

General Election 1991: Bhola-3
Party	Candidate	Votes	%	±%
Independent	Hafizuddin Ahmed	36,925	44.9	
AL	M. A. Kashem	26,515	32.3	
Independent	AKM Nazrul Islam	15,071	18.3	
BNP	Mozzamel Haque	1,961	2.4	
Independent	Nazimuddin Alam	524	0.6	
Zaker Party	Md. Rafiqul Islam	524	0.6	
Independent	Md. Shafi Ullah	406	0.5	
BAKSAL	Nurul Islam	290	0.4	
Majority		10,410	12.7	
Turnout		82,216	41.7	
Independent gain from JP(E)				
