= Bhola-4 =

Constituency of Bangladesh's Jatiya Sangsad

Coordinates: 22.19°N 90.76°E

- Constituency for the Jatiya Sangsad
- District: Bhola District
- Division: Barisal Division
- Electorate: 502,026 (2026)

Current constituency
- Created: 1984
- Party: Bangladesh Nationalist Party
- Member: Mohammad Nurul Islam
- ← 117 Bhola-3 119 Barisal-1 →

Bhola-4 is a constituency represented in the Jatiya Sangsad (National Parliament) of Bangladesh since 2026 by Mohammad Nurul Islam of the Bangladesh Nationalist Party.

== Boundaries ==
The constituency encompasses Char Fasson and Manpura upazilas.

== History ==
The constituency was created in 1984 from a Bakerganj constituency when the former Bakerganj District was split into four districts: Bhola, Bakerganj, Jhalokati, and Pirojpur.

== Members of Parliament ==
Election	Member	Party
1986	Saad Zagulul Faruk	Jatiya Party
1991	M. M. Nazrul Islam	Awami League
1992 by-election	Jafar Ullah Chowdhury	Awami League
1996	Nazimuddin Alam	Bangladesh Nationalist Party
2001	Nazimuddin Alam	Bangladesh Nationalist Party
2008	Abdullah Al Islam Jakob	Awami League
2014	Abdullah Al Islam Jakob	Awami League
2018	Abdullah Al Islam Jakob	Awami League
2024	Abdullah Al Islam Jakob	Awami League
2026	Mohammad Nurul Islam	Bangladesh Nationalist Party

== Elections ==
=== Elections in the 2020s ===
General election 2026: Bhola-4
Party	Candidate	Votes	%	±%
BNP	Mohammad Nurul Islam	189,351	62.96	N/A
Jamaat	Mohammad Mustafa Kamal	81,437	27.08	N/A
Majority		107,914	35.88	N/A
Turnout		300,754	59.91	N/A
Registered electors		502,026		
BNP gain from AL				

=== Elections in the 2010s ===
Abdullah Al Islam Jacob was re-elected unopposed in the 2014 general election after opposition parties withdrew their candidacies in a boycott of the election.

=== Elections in the 2000s ===
General Election 2008: Bhola-4
Party	Candidate	Votes	%	±%
AL	Abdullah Al Islam Jacob	134,831	58.2	+25.1
BNP	Nazim Uddin Alam	95,732	41.3	−18.7
BDB	Md. Sirajul Islam	1,017	0.4	N/A
Majority		39,099	16.9	−10.0
Turnout		231,580	84.5	+27.2
AL gain from BNP				

General Election 2001: Bhola-4
Party	Candidate	Votes	%	±%
BNP	Nazim Uddin Alam	94,226	60.0	+4.0
AL	Abdullah Al Islam Jacob	51,937	33.1	−4.3
Independent	Jafar Ullah Chowdhury	9,648	6.2	N/A
IJOF	A. T. M. Kamal Hossain	953	0.6	N/A
KSJL	Md. Sirajul Islam	197	0.1	N/A
Majority		42,289	26.9	+8.6
Turnout		156,961	57.3	−8.9
BNP hold				

=== Elections in the 1990s ===
General Election June 1996: Bhola-4
Party	Candidate	Votes	%	±%
BNP	Nazim Uddin Alam	64,328	55.6	+42.9
AL	Jafar Ullah Chowdhury	43,213	37.4	−8.1
Jamaat	Ziaul Morshed	3,242	2.8	−7.1
JP(E)	Motahar Hossain	2,095	1.8	−28.3
IOJ	Siddque Ullah	1,953	1.7	+1.5
IAB	Md. Shahadat Hossain	399	0.4	N/A
Gano Forum	Momtaz Begum	397	0.3	N/A
Majority		21,115	18.3	+2.9
Turnout		115,627	66.2	+31.7
BNP gain from AL				

M. M. Nazrul Islam died in office in September 1992. Jafar Ullah Chowdhury was elected in a December 1992 by-election.

General Election 1991: Bhola-4
Party	Candidate	Votes	%	±%
AL	M. M. Nazrul Islam	32,719	45.5	
JP(E)	Naziur Rahman Manzur	21,638	30.1	
BNP	A. K. F. Aminul Ekram	9,110	12.7	
Jamaat	Md. Shahjahan MA	7,097	9.9	
Zaker Party	Yakub Ali Chowdhury	617	0.9	
BAKSAL	A. Malek	330	0.5	
Independent	Ansar Uddin	262	0.4	
IOJ	Md. Oli Ullah Miah	114	0.2	
Majority		11,081	15.4	
Turnout		71,877	34.5	
AL gain from JP(E)				
