= Sultana Bulbul =

Bangladeshi politician

Member of Bangladesh Parliament
- In office 2009–2014

Personal details
- Political party: Bangladesh Awami League

Sultana Bulbul is a Bangladesh Awami League politician and a former member of the Bangladesh Parliament from a reserved seat.

== Early life ==
Bulbul was born on 15 January 1950 and has studied up to S.S.C. or grade ten.

== Career ==
Bulbul was elected to parliament from a reserved seat as a Bangladesh Awami League candidate in 2009.
