= Mosharraf Hossain (Bogra politician) =

Bangladeshi politician

Md Mosharrf Hossain
- মোঃ মোশারফ হোসেন

Member of the Bangladesh Parliament for Bogra-4
- Incumbent
- Assumed office 17 February 2026
- Preceded by: A. K. M. Rezaul Karim Tansen
- In office 29 April 2019 – 11 December 2022
- Preceded by: A. K. M. Rezaul Karim Tansen
- Succeeded by: A. K. M. Rezaul Karim Tansen

Personal details
- Party: Bangladesh Nationalist Party
- Profession: Politician

Md Mosharrf Hossain is a Bangladesh Nationalist Party politician and a former Jatiya Sangsad member representing the Bogra-4 constituency during 2019–2022. He resigned from the position on 11 December 2022.

== Career ==
Hossain was elected to parliament from Bogra-4 as a Bangladesh Nationalist Party candidate on 30 December 2018.
