= Nargis Ara Haque =

Bangladeshi politician

Member of Bangladesh Parliament
- In office 1996–2001

Personal details
- Party: Awami League

Nargis Ara Haque is an Awami League politician and a member of the Bangladesh Parliament from a reserved seat.

== Career ==
Haque was elected to parliament as an Awami League candidate in 1996 from reserved seat-12.
