= Bharati Nandi Sarkar =

Bangladeshi politician

Member of Bangladesh Parliament
- In office 1996–2001

Personal details
- Died: 9 October 2021; Dinajpur
- Political party: Awami League

Bharati Nandi Sarkar is an Awami League politician and a member of the Bangladesh Parliament from a reserved seat.

Bharati Nandi Sarkar emerged from the heart of Dinajpur, shaping her political identity through grassroots involvement and historic commitment. As a freedom fighter during the 1971 Liberation War, she demonstrated early on a dedication to national ideals. Later, she broke new ground in local governance, becoming the first woman commissioner of Dinajpur Municipality (1974–1978), before being elected to the Bangladesh Parliament in 1996 through one of the women’s reserved seats. Her journey reflects an individual, a woman, who wore many hats: educator, local leader, and national representative.

During her parliamentary tenure (1996–2001), Bharati Nandi Sarkar served on the Standing Committee for the Ministry of Food, where she voiced concerns central to community welfare, especially as they pertain to nutrition and food security. Beyond policymaking, she contributed to women’s empowerment at the district level for decades, notably as president of the Mohila Awami League in Dinajpur for almost 23 years and as a presidium member of the Bangladesh Hindu, Buddhist and Christian Oikya Parishad until 2015. Her career blends local activism with national governance, grounded in service and representation.

== Career ==
Sarkar was elected to parliament from a reserved seat as an Awami League candidate in 1996. She served in the standing committee on the Food Ministry.
