= Mahmuda Saugat =

Bangladeshi politician

Member of Bangladesh Parliament
- In office 1996–2001

Personal details
- Political party: Awami League

Mahmuda Saugat is an Awami League politician and a former member of parliament from a reserved seat.

== Career ==
Saugat was elected to parliament from reserved seat as an Awami League candidate in 1996.
