= Parvin Zaman Kalpana =

Bangladeshi politician

- পারভীন জামান কল্পনা

Member of the Bangladesh Parliament for Reserved women's seat-9
- In office 28 February 2024 – 6 August 2024
- Preceded by: Kh. Momota Hena Lovely

Personal details
- Born: 10 March 1956 (age 70)
- Party: Bangladesh Awami League

Parvin Zaman Kalpana (born 10 March 1956) is a Bangladesh Awami League politician and a Jatiya Sangsad member from a women's reserved for Jhenaidah District.
