= Māori naming customs =

In New Zealand before the 1800s, Māori children would be called by one given name (simple or composite). These names were attributed to remarkable events around birth. Later in life a person might be given a new name relating to subsequent events.

== Pre-contact ==
Individuals often had a single name, and took on new names in order to mark changes in their lives. Name changes were done so to maintain collective memory in an oral culture.

== 1800–1900 ==
With the arrival of Europeans, surnames were introduced and soon after a Māori surname system was devised where a person would take their father's name as a surname, for example:

Ariki – Maunga Ariki – Waiora Maunga – Te Awa Waiora – Waipapa Te Awa

Māori would also have translations of their names, for example:

John Te Awa – Hone River – John River – Hone Waipapa Te Awa – John Waipapa Te Awa – Hone Waipapa – John Waipapa

== 20th century ==
Children born after World War II were often given first names that reflected prominent battle sites during the war to commemorate the Māori generation that had not survived. Examples of such names included: Tunis, Alamein, Medenine, Faenza and Cassino.

== 21st century ==
Māori names made up 1.6% of all registered names in 2011, with that number rising to 2.6% registered in 2020. The criteria in order to be recognized as such was that the name must match the Māori Language Commission orthography, at least one parent must be Māori, and at least 10 children are born with that name. The names Nikau and Mia were the most popular names in 2020.
