= Mohammad Jashimuddin (politician) =

Bangladeshi politician

Member of Parliament for Bhola-3
- In office 29 December 2008 – 18 October 2009
- Preceded by: Hafizuddin Ahmed
- Succeeded by: Nurunnabi Chowdhury

Personal details
- Party: Bangladesh Awami League

Military service
- Allegiance: Bangladesh
- Branch/service: Bangladesh Army
- Years of service: 1976 - 2004
- Rank: Major
- Unit: Armoured Corps
- Commands: 2IC of 4th Horse Regiment; Quarter Master of Bengal Cavalry Regiment

Mohammad Jashimuddin is a Bangladesh Awami League politician, a retired major of the Bangladesh Army, and a former Jatiya Sangsad member from the Bhola-3 constituency.

== Career ==
Jashimuddin was elected to the parliament in the 2008 election from Bhola-3 as a Bangladesh Awami League candidate. His rival, Hafizuddin Ahmed of the Bangladesh Nationalist Party, filed a petition with the court challenging the legality of the election. The Bangladesh High Court ruled against him, as he had been sent on forced retirement from the Bangladesh Army on 31 August 2004. According to Bangladesh law, government employees who have been sent to forced retirement cannot contest elections within 5 years. By-elections were called for Bhola-3, which was won by Awami League candidate Nurunnabi Chowdhury.
