= Noor Afroj Ali =

Bangladeshi politician

Member of Bangladesh Parliament
- In office 2009–2014

Personal details
- Party: Bangladesh Awami League

Noor Afroj Ali is a Bangladesh Awami League politician and a former member of the Bangladesh Parliament from a reserved seat.

== Career ==
Ali was elected to parliament from a reserved seat as a Bangladesh Awami League candidate in 2009.
