= Sabita Begum =

Bangladeshi politician

Member of Bangladesh Parliament
- In office 1996–2001

Personal details
- Party: Jatiya Party (Ershad)

Sabita Begum is a Bangladeshi Jatiya Party (Ershad) politician and a member of the Bangladesh Parliament from a reserved seat.

== Career ==
Begum was elected to parliament from reserved seat as a Jatiya Party (Ershad) candidate in 1996.
