= Hasina Mannan =

Bangladeshi politician

- হাসিনা মান্নান

Member of the Bangladesh Parliament for Reserved Women's Seat–48
- In office 9 December 2011 – 24 January 2014
- Preceded by: Position created

Personal details
- Born: 15 October 1947 (age 77)
- Political party: Bangladesh Awami League

Hasina Mannan (born 15 October 1947) is a Bangladesh Awami League politician and a former member of the Bangladesh Parliament representing a women's reserved seat.

== Career ==
Mannan was president of the Chittagong South District Women's Awami League. She was elected to parliament from a reserved seat as a Bangladesh Awami League candidate in 2009.
