= Government Abdur Rashid Talukdar Degree College =

College in Bangladesh

- সরকারি আবদুর রশিদ তালুকদার ডিগ্রী কলেজ
- Former name: Abdur Rashid Talukdar Degree College
- Motto: Education is Light
- Type: Government college
- Established: 1994
- Founders: Begum Jebunnessa and Kazi Mahabub Ullah Janakalyan Trust
- Academic affiliations: National University, Bangladesh, Board of Intermediate and Secondary Education, Barisal
- Students: 2,500
- Location: Dashmina, Patuakhali District, Bangladesh; 22.8794°N 91.1056°E

Government Abdur Rashid Talukdar Degree College is a public college in Dashmina, Patuakhali District, Bangladesh.

== History ==
It was established in 1984. The college is affiliated with National University, Bangladesh. In 2018, the college was nationalized.
