= Mohammad Hasan Ali Talukder =

Bangladeshi politician

Member of Bangladesh Parliament

Personal details
- Died: c. 2003
- Party: Bangladesh Awami League
- Spouse: Khadiza Khatun Shefali

Mohammad Hasan Ali Talukder was a Bangladesh Awami League politician and a former member of parliament for Bogra-3.

== Career ==
Talukder was elected to parliament from Bogra-3 as a Bangladesh Awami League candidate in 1973.

He founded Shahid M Monsur Ali College in Dhupchanchia Upazila. His wife, Khadiza Khatun Shefali, was principal of the college.
