= Farida Rauf Asha =

Bangladeshi politician

Member of Bangladesh Parliament
- In office 1996–2001

Personal details
- Party: Awami League

Farida Rauf Asha is a Awami League politician and a former member of parliament from a reserved seat.

== Career ==
Asha was elected to parliament from a reserved seat as an Awami League candidate in 1996. In 2012, she was called on by Minister of Telecommunications Rajiuddin Ahmed Raju in parliament for failing to pay her telephone bills.
