= Nurunnabi Chowdhury =

Bangladeshi politician

Nurunnabi Chowdhury Shaon
- নুরুন্নবী চৌধুরী শাওন

Member of the Bangladesh Parliament for Bhola-3
- In office 29 April 2010 – 6 August 2024
- Preceded by: Mohammad Jashimuddin
- Succeeded by: Hafiz Uddin Ahmad

Personal details
- Born: 1 December 1968 (age 57)
- Party: Bangladesh Awami League

Nurunnabi Chowdhury (born 1 December 1968) is a Bangladesh Awami League politician and a former Jatiya Sangsad member representing the Bhola-3 constituency.

== Education ==
Chowdhury completed his BBA and MBA degrees.

== Career ==
Bangladesh Awami League candidate Jashimuddin was elected to parliament for Bhola-3 in the 2008 Bangladeshi general election. The seat was vacated in 2010 as the result of a Supreme Court ruling. A by-election was called for Bhola-3, which was won by Awami League candidate Chowdhury on 29 April 2010, against Major Hafizuddin Ahmed of the Bangladesh Nationalist Party.

Chowdhury was re-elected in 2014, 2018 and 2024 as the MP of Bhola-3.

== Controversy ==
On 13 August 2010, Ibrahim Ahmed, a local Jubo League leader, had died after being shot with a gun belonging to Chowdhury. Chowdhury's driver Kala filed an unnatural death case with the police and claimed Ibrahim accidentally shot himself while handling the gun in the MP's car. The Detective Branch of the police suspected foul play. On 19 August 2010, Ibrahim's brother filed a murder case against Chowdhury and 17 others with a court in Dhaka. On 12 January 2012, the Criminal Investigation Department pressed murder charges against six defendants. The accused included Chowhury's driver, bodyguard, personal secretary, and three members of the Jubo League, but excluded Nurunnabi Chowdhury.
