= Khaleda Khanam =

Bangladeshi politician (c. 1949–2022)

Khaleda Khanam (c. 1949 – 11 September 2022) was a veteran of Bangladesh Liberation war, educator, and Awami League politician. She served as a member of parliament and parliamentary whip.

== Career ==
Khanam was a professor and head of the Department of Political Science at Lalmatia Govt. Mohila College. She retired from academia in 2009. She was the general secretary of the Bangladesh National Society for the Blind.

Khanam was the General Secretary and Co-Vice President of the Bangladesh Mohila Awami League.

Khanam served as a Whip in the Bangladesh Parliament from the women's reserved seat in 1996.

== Death ==
Khanam died on 11 September 2022.
