= Aleya Afroz =

Bangladeshi politician

- আলেয়া আফরোজ়

Member of Bangladesh Parliament
- In office 1996–2001

Personal details
- Party: Awami League

Aleya Afroz (Bengali: আলেয়া আফরোজ়, Bengali pronunciation: [aleja afroz]) is an Awami League politician and a member of the Bangladesh parliament from a reserved seat.

== Career ==
Afroz was elected to parliament from a reserved seat as an Awami League candidate in 1996. She is the President of Rights Jessore.
