= Cheman Ara Taiyab =

Bangladeshi politician

Member of Bangladesh Parliament
- In office 2008–2014

Personal details
- Political party: Bangladesh Awami League

Cheman Ara Taiyab (Bengali: চেমন আরা তৈয়ব) is a Bangladesh Awami League politician and a former member of parliament from a reserved seat.

== Career ==
Taiyab was elected to parliament from a reserved seat as a Bangladesh Awami League candidate in 2008.
