= Manpura Upazila =

Manpura মনপুরা
- Upazila
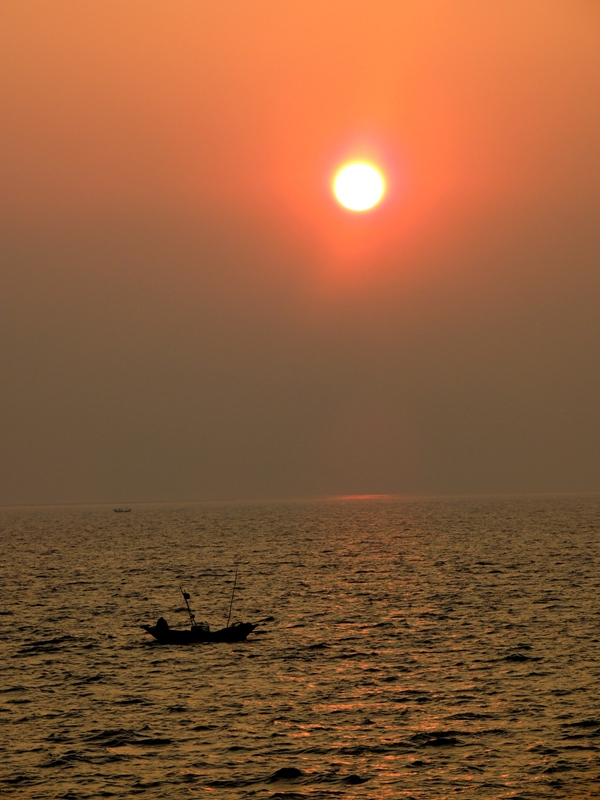
- Sunset of Manpura Island

- Coordinates: 22°17.9′N 90°58.8′E
- Country: Bangladesh
- Division: Barisal Division
- District: Bhola District

Government
  - Honorable Parliament Member: Abdullah Al-Islam Jakob

Area
  - Total: 373.18 km^{2} (144.09 sq mi)

Population (2022)
  - Total: 89,745
  - Density: 240.49/km^{2} (622.86/sq mi)
- Time zone: UTC+6 (BST)
- Postal code: 8360
- Website: monpura.bhola.gov.bd

Manpura Upazila mauza geocode map

Manpura (Bengali: মনপুরা) is an upazila of Bhola District in the Division of Barisal, Bangladesh.

== Geography ==
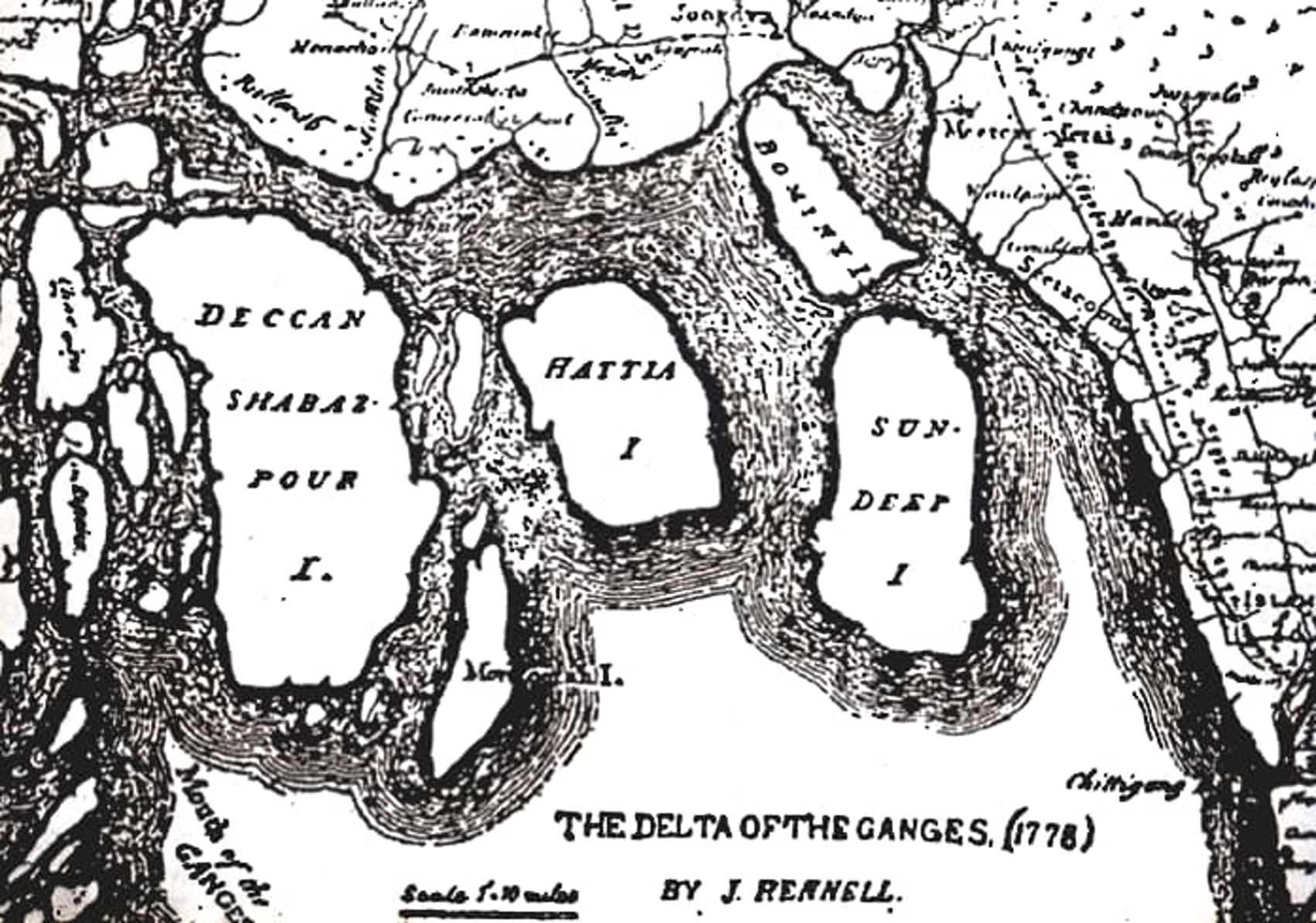
Manpura Island (marked as Moncoorah I.) in 1778 map by James Rennell

Manpura is located at 22.2986°N 90.9792°E. It has 8,959 households and a total area of 373.19 km^{2}. It is bounded by Tazumuddin upazila on the north, Bay of Bengal on the south, Hatiya upazila on the east, Lalmohan and Char Fasson upazilas on the west.

== Demographics ==
Religions in Manpura Upazila (2022)
Religion	Percent
Islam	95.43%
Hinduism	4.57%

According to the 2022 Bangladeshi census, Monpura Upazila had 20,065 households and a population of 89,745. 13.22% of the population were under 5 years of age. Monpura had a literacy rate (age 7 and over) of 61.29%: 59.42% for males and 63.17% for females, and a sex ratio of 100.58 males for every 100 females. 30,213 (33.67%) lived in urban areas.

As of the 2011 Census of Bangladesh, Manpura has a population of 76,582 living in 17,080 households. 22,066 (28.81%) were under 10 years of age. Manpura has an average literacy rate of 32.10% (7+ years) and a sex ratio of 977 females per 1000 males. 1,023 (1.34%) of the population lives in urban areas.

According to the 2001 Bangladesh census, Manpura had a population of 67,304. Males constituted 51.63% of the population, and females 48.37%. The population aged 18 or over was 20,940. Manpura had an average literacy rate of 21.3% (7+ years), compared to the national average of 50.4%+.

== Administration ==
Manpura was formed as a Thana on 25 December 1970 and it was turned into an upazila on 7 November 1983.

Manpura Upazila is divided into four union parishads: Dakshin Sakuchia, Hazirhat, Monpura, and Uttar Sakuchia. The union parishads are subdivided into 18 mauzas and 30 villages.

== Education ==
- Monpura Degree College
- Monoyara Begum mohila college
- Abdullah al Islam Jakob College
- Sakuchia Badiuzzaman Dakhil Madrasah
- Monpura Girls' Secondary School
- Hazir Hat Girls School
- North Sakucia Secondary School

== Notable people ==
- Jafar Ullah Chowdhury, politician

== See also ==
- Upazilas of Bangladesh
- Districts of Bangladesh
- Divisions of Bangladesh
