= Rhonda Hira =

New Zealand softball player

Personal information
- Born: 18 July 1965 (age 60)

Sport
- Country: New Zealand
- Sport: Softball

Rhonda Hira (born 18 July 1965) is a New Zealand softball player who competed in the 2000 Summer Olympics. Hira grew up in Waipukurau and was educated at Waipukurau Primary, Central Hawke's Bay College and Mana College in Porirua. In international matches Hira mainly played as second base. Hira was the top position player on the team, as she hit .375 during the tournament. She made her debut with New Zealand National Softball Team in 1983, and represented the 'White Sox' in five world championships, winning a bronze medal at her first tournament in 1986, and silver in 1990. She is the highest capped New Zealand women's player in softball. Hira was inducted into the International Softball Hall of Fame (ISF) in 2009, and the Hawke's Bay Sports Hall of Fame in 2013.
