= Maryam Begum (politician) =

Bangladeshi politician

Member of Bangladesh Parliament
- In office 1996–2001

Personal details
- Political party: Awami League

Maryam Begum is Bangladeshi politician who is a member of the Awami League and a member of the Bangladesh Parliament from a reserved seat.

== Career ==
Begum was elected to parliament from reserved seat as an Awami League candidate in 1996 from seat-18.
