= Joypurhat-2 =

Constituency of Bangladesh's Jatiya Sangsad

Coordinates: 25.06°N 89.17°E

- Constituency for the Jatiya Sangsad
- District: Joypurhat District
- Division: Rajshahi Division
- Electorate: 351,572 (2026)

Current constituency
- Created: 1984
- Party: Bangladesh Nationalist Party
- Member: Md. Abdul Bari
- ← 34 Joypurhat-1 36 Bogra-1 →

Joypurhat-2 is a constituency represented in the Jatiya Sangsad (National Parliament) of Bangladesh since 2026 by Md. Abdul Bari of the Bangladesh Nationalist Party.

== Boundaries ==
The constituency encompasses Akkelpur, Kalai and Khetlal upazilas.

== History ==
The constituency was created in 1984 from a Bogra constituency when the former Bogra District was split into two districts: Bogra and Joypurhat.

== Members of Parliament ==
Election	Member	Party
1986	Md. Abdur Razzak Akand	Awami League
1988	Kazi Rabbiul Hasan	Combined Opposition Party
1991	Abu Yusuf Mohammad Khalilur Rahman	Bangladesh Nationalist Party
2008	Golam Mostafa	Bangladesh Nationalist Party
2014	Abu Sayeed Al Mahmood Swapon	Awami League
2026	Md. Abdul Bari	Bangladesh Nationalist Party

== Elections ==
=== Elections in the 2020s ===
General election 2026: Joypurhat-2
Party	Candidate	Votes	%	±%
BNP	Md. Abdul Bari			
AB Party	S. A. Zahid			
Jamaat	SM Rashedul Alam			
Majority				
Turnout				

=== Elections in the 2010s ===
Abu Sayeed Al Mahmood Swapon was elected unopposed in the 2014 general election after opposition parties withdrew their candidacies in a boycott of the election.

=== Elections in the 2000s ===
General Election 2008: Joypurhat-2
Party	Candidate	Votes	%	±%
BNP	Golam Mostafa	116,881	50.4	−7.1
AL	Abu Sayeed Al Mahmood Swapon	113,721	49.0	+9.7
BSD	Md Sha Zaman Talukder	839	0.4	N/A
Independent	Abdul Aziz Molla	687	0.3	N/A
Majority		3,160	1.4	−16.8
Turnout		232,008	92.4	+5.6
BNP hold				

General Election 2001: Joypurhat-2
Party	Candidate	Votes	%	±%
BNP	Abu Yusuf Mohammad Khalilur Rahman	113,290	57.5	+9.6
AL	Mir Jalalur Rahman	77,508	39.3	+14.7
IJOF	Abu Syed Md. Nurulla	5,394	2.7	N/A
Bangladesh Samajtantrik Dal (Basad-Khalekuzzaman)	Md. Shahjaman Tang	580	0.3	N/A
JSD	Mu. Zalilur Rahman Zillu	340	0.2	N/A
Majority		35,782	18.2	−5.2
Turnout		197,112	86.8	+3.5
BNP hold				

=== Elections in the 1990s ===
General Election June 1996: Joypurhat-2
Party	Candidate	Votes	%	±%
BNP	Abu Yusuf Mohammad Khalilur Rahman	76,857	47.9	+2.6
AL	Mir Zalalur Rahman	39,267	24.5	−3.5
JP(E)	Kazi Rabbi Hasan	28,754	17.9	+15.9
Jamaat	Kamal Uddin	14,850	9.3	−8.6
Zaker Party	S. M. Khokon Chowdhury	414	0.3	−0.1
NAP (Bhashani)	Tejesh Chandra	313	0.2	N/A
Majority		37,590	23.4	+0.9
Turnout		160,455	83.3	+18.7
BNP hold				

General Election 1991: Joypurhat-2
Party	Candidate	Votes	%	±%
BNP	Abu Yusuf Mohammad Khalilur Rahman	59,692	50.5	
AL	Md. Abdur Razzak Akand	33,071	28.0	
Jamaat	Md. Nuruzzaman Sarkar	21,133	17.9	
JP(E)	Kazi Rabbi Hasan	2,355	2.0	
Independent	Kazi Reshadur Rahman	692	0.6	
NIP	Md. Abul Kasem Mondol	503	0.4	
Zaker Party	S. M. Khokon Chowdhury	466	0.4	
IOJ	Md. Abdul Momen Fakir	263	0.2	
Independent	Khandakar Oliuzzaman Alam	107	0.1	
Majority		26,621	22.5	
Turnout		118,282	64.6	
BNP gain from JP(E)				
