= M. M. Nazrul Islam =

Bangladeshi politician

Member of Parliament for Bakerganj-3
- In office 2 April 1979 – 24 July 1982

Member of Parliament for Bhola-4
- In office 5 March 1991 – 17 September 1992

Personal details
- Born: 16 October 1943 Madrasha Bazar, Lord Harding Union, Lalmohan Upazila, Bhola
- Died: 17 September 1992 (aged 48)
- Political party: Bangladesh Awami League
- Relatives: Abdullah Al Islam Jakob (son)

M. M. Nazrul Islam (16 October 1943 – 17 September 1992) was a Bangladeshi academic and politician from Bhola belonging to the Bangladesh Awami League. He was elected twice as a member of the Jatiya Sangsad. He was the father of Abdullah Al Islam Jakob.

== Biography ==
Nazrul Islam was born on 17 October 1943 at Chandpur in Lamohan of Bhola. After completing primary, secondary and higher secondary studies he graduated from Brojomohun College in 1964. Later, he received a postgraduate degree in economics from the University of Dhaka in 1966.

Nazrul Islam was a teacher at Kashimpur High School of Barisal and Dularhat High School of Char Fasson. Later, he joined Char Fasson T. B. High School as the headmaster of that institution. In 1968 he joined Char Fasson College as the founding principal of that institution. He was an organizer of the Liberation War of Bangladesh.

Nazrul Islam was elected as a member of the Jatiya Sangsad from Bakerganj-3 in 1979. Later, he was elected as a member of the Jatiya Sangsad from Bhola-4 in 1991.

Nazrul Islam died on 17 September 1992 at a hospital in Dhaka at the age of 48.
