= Parvin Talukder Maya =

Bangladeshi politician

Member of Bangladesh Parliament
- In office 2009–2014

Personal details
- Party: Bangladesh Awami League

Parvin Talukder Maya is a Bangladesh Awami League politician and a former member of parliament from a reserved seat.

== Career ==
Maya was elected to parliament from a reserved seat as a Bangladesh Awami League candidate in 2009. On 17 May 2018, over 600 people fell sick after eating food at an event organized by her and her husband in Jhenaidah District.
