= Z. I. M. Mostofa Ali =

Bangladeshi politician

Member of Bangladesh Parliament

Personal details
- Party: Bangladesh Nationalist Party

Z. I. M. Mostofa Ali is a Bangladesh Nationalist Party politician and a former member of parliament for Bogra-4.

== Career ==
Ali was elected to parliament from Bogra-4 as a Bangladesh Nationalist Party candidate in 2008. He served on the Parliamentary Standing committee on health and family welfare ministry.
