= Farida Akhter Hira =

Bangladeshi politician

Member of Bangladesh Parliament
- In office 2008–2014

Personal details
- Born: October 30, 1956 (age 69)
- Political party: Bangladesh Awami League

Farida Akhter Hira (30 October 1956) is a Bangladesh Awami League politician and a former member of the Bangladesh Parliament from a reserved seat.

== Career ==
Hira was elected to parliament from a reserved seat as a Bangladesh Awami League candidate in 2009.
