= Abdul Majid Talukdar =

Bangladeshi politician

- আব্দুল মজিদ তালুকদার

Member of Parliament for Bogra-3
- In office 2 April 1979 – 24 March 1982
- Preceded by: Hasan Ali Talukder
- Succeeded by: ABM Shahjahan
- In office 5 March 1991 – 24 November 1995
- Succeeded by: Golam Mawla
- In office 14 July 1996 – 13 July 2001
- Succeeded by: Abdul Momen Talukder

Personal details
- Born: 24 April 1920 Kalaikuri, Adamdighi thana, British India
- Died: 2002
- Party: Bangladesh Nationalist Party
- Children: Abdul Momen Talukder

Abdul Majid Talukdar was a Bangladesh Nationalist Party politician and a former member of parliament for Bogra-3. His son, Abdul Momen Talukder, was also elected to parliament from Bogra-3.

== Biography ==
Abdul Majid Talukdar was born on 24 April 1920 in Kalaikuri village of what is now Adamdighi Upazila, Bogra District, Bangladesh.

Talukdar was elected to parliament from Bogra-3 as a Bangladesh Nationalist Party candidate in 1979, 1991, and 1996.

He died in 2002.
