= Bogra-4 =

Constituency of Bangladesh's Jatiya Sangsad

Coordinates: 24.83°N 89.26°E

- Constituency for the Jatiya Sangsad
- District: Bogra District
- Division: Rajshahi Division
- Electorate: 344,512 (2024)

Current constituency
- Created: 1973
- Member: Mosharraf Hossain
- ← 38 Bogra-3 40 Bogra-5 →

Bogra-4 is a constituency represented in the Jatiya Sangsad (National Parliament) of Bangladesh since 2026 by Mosharraf Hossain of the Bangladesh Nationalist Party.

== Boundaries ==
The constituency encompasses Kahaloo and Nandigram upazilas.

== History ==
The constituency was created for the first general elections in newly independent Bangladesh, held in 1973.

Ahead of the 2008 general election, the Election Commission redrew constituency boundaries to reflect population changes revealed by the 2001 Bangladesh census. The 2008 redistricting altered the boundaries of the constituency.

== Members of Parliament ==
| Election | Member | Party |
|---|---|---|
| 1973 | Mozaffar Hossain | Awami League |
| 1979 | AKM Motiar Rahman | Bangladesh Nationalist Party |
Major Boundary Changes
| 1986 | Mamdudur Rahman Chowdhury | Jatiya Party |
| 1991 | Azizul Haq Mollah | Bangladesh Nationalist Party |
| 1994 by-election | Ziaul Haque Mollah | Bangladesh Nationalist Party |
| 2008 | Z. I. M. Mostofa Ali | Bangladesh Nationalist Party |
| 2014 | AKM Rezaul Karim Tansen | Jatiya Samajtantrik Dal |
| 2018 | Mosharraf Hossain | Bangladesh Nationalist Party |
| 2023 by-election | AKM Rezaul Karim Tansen | Jatiya Samajtantrik Dal |
| 2026 | Mosharraf Hossain | Bangladesh Nationalist Party |

== Elections ==
=== Elections in the 2020s ===
General election 2026: Bogra-4
| Party | Candidate | Votes | % | ±% |
|---|---|---|---|---|
| BNP | Md. MosaroF Hossain | | | |
| Jamaat | Md. Mostofa Foysal | | | |
| IAB | Muha Uddin Ali | | | |
| JP(E) | Sahin Mostofa Kamal | | | |
| Majority | | | | |
| Turnout | | | | |

=== Elections in the 2010s ===
General Election 2018: Bogra-4
| Party | Candidate | Votes | % | ±% |
|---|---|---|---|---|
| BNP | Md Mosharraf Hossain | 1,28,585 | | N/A |
| JSD | AKM Rezaul Karim Tansen | 86,048 | | N/A |
| IAB | Md Idris Ali | 5,247 | | N/A |
| Majority | | | | |
| Turnout | | 3,12,081 | | |
| BNP gain from JSD | | | | |

General Election 2014: Bogra-4
| Party | Candidate | Votes | % | ±% |
|---|---|---|---|---|
| JSD | AKM Rezaul Karim Tansen | 22,203 | 62.2 | +29.4 |
| JP(E) | Md. Nurul Amin Bachhu | 13,489 | 37.8 | N/A |
| Majority | | 8,714 | 24.4 | +0.5 |
| Turnout | | 35,692 | 12.6 | −78.3 |
| JSD gain from BNP | | | | |

=== Elections in the 2000s ===
General Election 2008: Bogra-4
| Party | Candidate | Votes | % | ±% |
|---|---|---|---|---|
| BNP | Z. I. M. Mostofa Ali | 131,414 | 56.7 | −2.0 |
| JSD | AKM Rezaul Karim Tansen | 75,991 | 32.8 | +31.4 |
| LDP | Mamdudur Rahman Chowdhury | 21,737 | 9.4 | N/A |
| IAB | Abdul Haque Azad | 2,447 | 1.1 | N/A |
| Majority | | 55,423 | 23.9 | +2.2 |
| Turnout | | 231,589 | 90.9 | +4.5 |
| BNP hold | | | | |

General Election 2001: Bogra-4
| Party | Candidate | Votes | % | ±% |
|---|---|---|---|---|
| BNP | Ziaul Haq Molla | 114,814 | 58.7 | +15.9 |
| AL | Shahidul Alam Dudu | 72,464 | 37.1 | +11.5 |
| JSD | AKM Rezaul Karim Tansen | 2,778 | 1.4 | +0.8 |
| IJOF | Md. Nurul Amin Bachhu | 2,683 | 1.4 | N/A |
| Independent | Saiful Islam | 2,446 | 1.3 | N/A |
| Gano Forum | Md. Atikul Mahbub | 311 | 0.2 | 0.0 |
| Majority | | 42,350 | 21.7 | +4.5 |
| Turnout | | 195,496 | 86.4 | +3.9 |
| BNP hold | | | | |

=== Elections in the 1990s ===
General Election June 1996: Bogra-4
| Party | Candidate | Votes | % | ±% |
|---|---|---|---|---|
| BNP | Ziaul Haque Molla | 64,141 | 42.8 | +6.8 |
| AL | Shahidul Alam Dudu | 38,395 | 25.6 | −0.4 |
| Jamaat | Nazir Ahmed Mondol | 32,625 | 21.8 | −6.8 |
| JP(E) | Mamdudur Rahman Chowdhury | 12,850 | 8.6 | +1.4 |
| JSD | AKM Rezaul Karim Tansen | 888 | 0.6 | −0.8 |
| Zaker Party | Md. Sohidul Islam Dulal | 468 | 0.3 | −0.3 |
| Gano Forum | Md. Atiqul Mahbub | 337 | 0.2 | N/A |
| Bangladesh Freedom Party | Md. Saidul Islam Talukder | 247 | 0.2 | N/A |
| Majority | | 25,746 | 17.2 | +9.8 |
| Turnout | | 149,951 | 82.5 | +13.0 |
| BNP hold | | | | |

General Election 1991: Bogra-4
| Party | Candidate | Votes | % | ±% |
|---|---|---|---|---|
| BNP | Azizul Haq Mollah | 43,247 | 36.0 | |
| Jamaat | Abdur Rahman Fakir | 34,372 | 28.6 | |
| AL | Shahidul Alam Dudu | 31,192 | 26.0 | |
| JP(E) | Mamdudur Rahman Chowdhury | 8,597 | 7.2 | |
| JSD | AKM Rezaul Karim Tansen | 1,639 | 1.4 | |
| Zaker Party | Md. Shahidul Islam | 767 | 0.6 | |
| Jatiya Samajtantrik Dal-JSD | Atiqul Islam Atik | 351 | 0.3 | |
| Majority | | 8,875 | 7.4 | |
| Turnout | | 120,165 | 69.5 | |
| BNP gain from JP(E) | | | | |
