= Golam Mostafa =

Bangladeshi politician

Member of Bangladesh Parliament

Personal details
- Party: Bangladesh Nationalist Party

Golam Mostafa is a Bangladesh Nationalist Party politician and a former member of parliament for Joypurhat-2.

== Career ==
Mostafa was elected to parliament from Joypurhat-2 as a Bangladesh Nationalist Party candidate in 2008.
