= Abu Yusuf Mohammad Khalilur Rahman =

Bangladeshi politician

Member of Bangladesh Parliament

Personal details
- Party: Bangladesh Nationalist Party

Abu Yusuf Mohammad Khalilur Rahman is a Bangladesh Nationalist Party politician and a former member of parliament for Joypurhat-2.

== Career ==
Rahman was elected to parliament from Joypurhat-2 as a Bangladesh Nationalist Party candidate in 1991, 1996, 1996, and 2001. He was an executive committee member of the Bangladesh Nationalist Party but was expelled for his support of reforming the party during the 2007-08 caretaker government term. He was readmitted to the Bangladesh Nationalist Party in 2018.
