= Rehana Akter Hira =

Bangladeshi politician

Member of Bangladesh Parliament
- In office 1996–2001

Personal details
- Political party: Awami League

Rehana Akter Hira is an Awami League politician and a former member of the Bangladesh Parliament from a reserved seat.

== Career ==
Hira was elected to parliament as an Awami League candidate in 1996 from reserved seat-09.
