= Ziaul Haque Mollah =

Bangladeshi politician

Member of Bangladesh Parliament
- In office 1991–2006

Personal details
- Party: Bangladesh Nationalist Party

Ziaul Haque Mollah is a Bangladesh Nationalist Party politician and a former member of parliament for Bogra-4.

== Career ==
Mollah was elected to parliament from Bogra-4 as a Bangladesh Nationalist Party candidate in 2001.
