= Asma Zerin Jhumu =

Bangladeshi politician

- আসমা জ়েরিন ঝুমু

Member of Bangladesh Parliament
- In office 2008–2014

Personal details
- Born: 1 November 1970 (age 55)
- Party: Bangladesh Awami League

Asma Zerin Jhumu (Bengali: আসমা জ়েরীন ঝুমু, Bengali pronunciation: [asma zerin dʒʱumu]) is a Bangladesh Awami League politician and a former member of parliament from a reserved seat.

== Career ==
Jhumu was born on 1 November 1970. She completed a Master of Social Science degree.

Jhumu was elected to parliament from a reserved seat as a Bangladesh Awami League candidate in 2008. She was the organisational secretary of Bangladesh Mohila Awami League.
