= Shaheen Monwara Haque =

Bangladeshi politician

Member of Bangladeshi Parliament from Constituency 330
- In office 25 January 2009 – 24 January 2014

Personal details
- Born: 23 September 1956 (age 68)
- Political party: Bangladesh Awami League

Shaheen Monwara Haque is a Bangladesh Awami League politician and a former member of the Bangladesh Parliament from a reserved seat.

== Early life ==
Haque was born on 23 September 1956. She has a H.S.C. degree.

== Career ==
Haque was elected to parliament from a reserved seat as a Bangladesh Awami League candidate in 2009. She was a member of the Standing Committee on the Ministry of Information.
