= Nazimuddin Alam =

Bangladeshi politician

- নাজিম উদ্দিন আলম

Member of Parliament
- Succeeded by: Abdullah Al Islam Jakob

Personal details
- Party: Bangladesh Nationalist Party

Nazimuddin Alam is a Bangladesh Nationalist Party politician and the former Member of Parliament from Bhola-4.

== Career ==
Alam was elected to Parliament in 2001 from Bhola-4 as a candidate of Bangladesh Nationalist Party.

He was charged with the attempted murder of Akhtarul Alam, a Bangladesh Jubo League who was attacked on 16 January 2004. The case was filled on 11 March 2007 against Alam and an arrest warrant was issued against him on 5 April 2008.

Alam is a member of the executive committee of the Bangladesh Nationalist Party.

He was arrested on 2 February 2018 by Bangladesh Police for vandalism in the Bangladesh Supreme Court premises.
