= Zinnatunnessa Talukdar =

Bangladeshi politician (1947–2023)

Zinatun Nesa Talukdar
- জিনাতুন নেসা তালুকদার
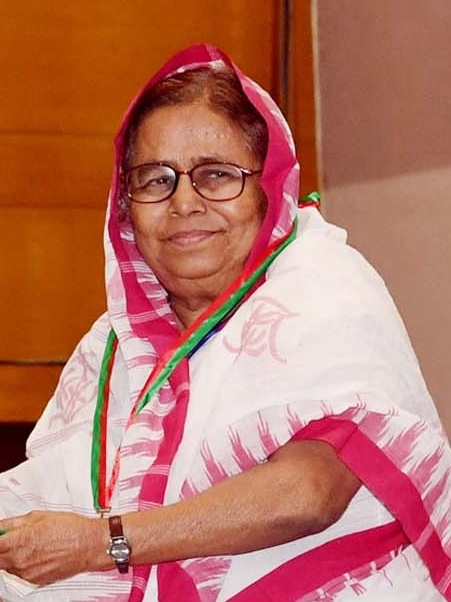
- Talukdar received Begum Rokeya Padak (2018)

State Minister of Primary and Mass Education
- In office 1 January 1998 – 15 July 2001

Deputy Minister of Primary and Mass Education
- In office 23 June 1996 – 31 December 1997

Personal details
- Born: 1947
- Died: 29 October 2023 (aged 76) Dhaka, Bangladesh
- Party: Bangladesh Awami League

Zinatun Nesa Talukdar (1947 – 29 October 2023) was a Bangladesh Awami League politician who was the state Minister of Primary and Mass Education. She also served as the State Minister of Women and Children Affairs. She was one of the three female ministers out of 43 cabinet ministers in the First Sheikh Hasina Cabinet during 1996–2001.

Talukdar was awarded by the Government of Bangladesh a Begum Rokeya Padak in 2018.

== Death ==
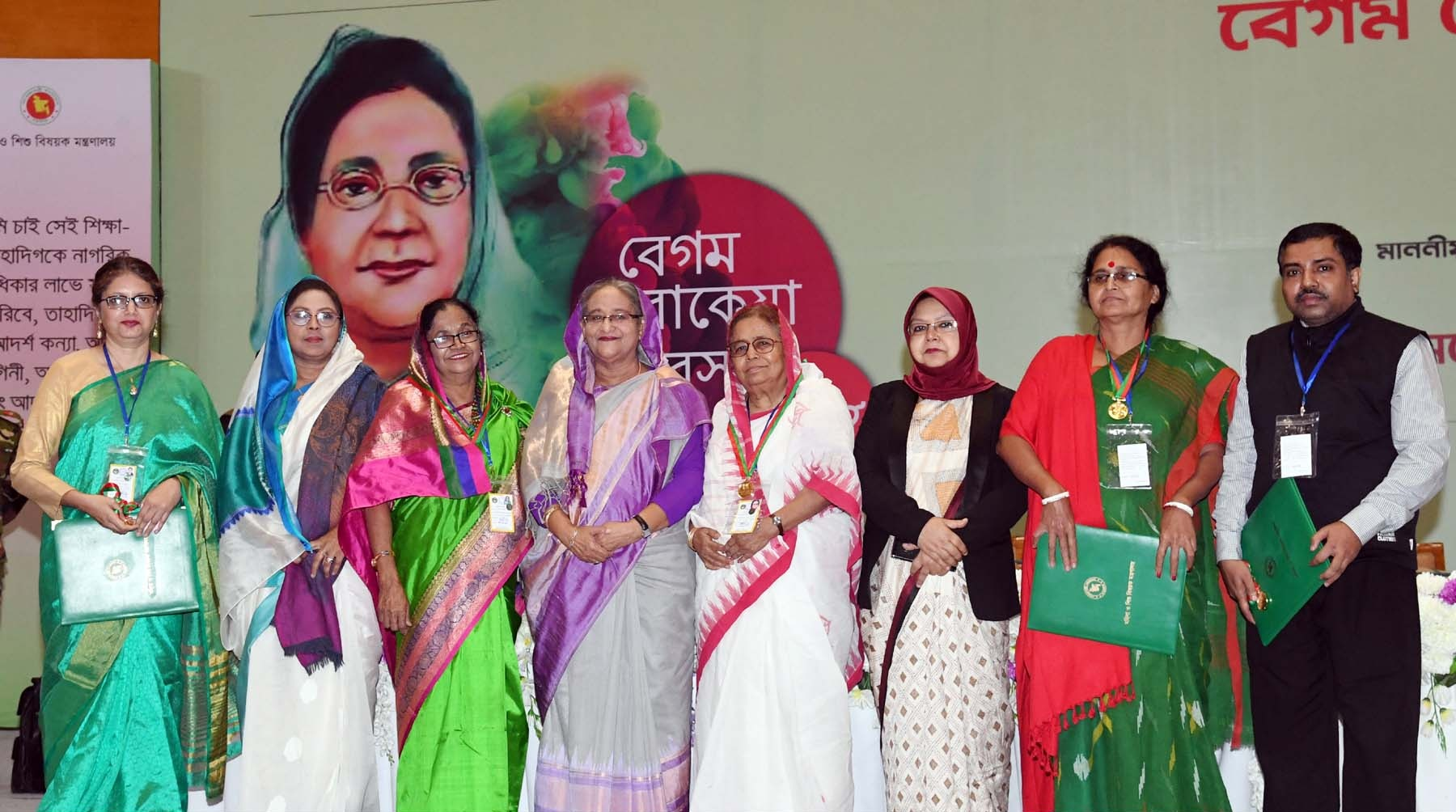
Talukdar received 2018 Begum Rokeya Padak

Talukdar died from heart and lung disease in Dhaka, on 29 October 2023, at the age of 76.
