= Abdul Momen Talukder =

Bangladeshi politician (1952–2025)

Abdul Momin Talukder
- আব্দুল মোমেন তালুকদার

Member of Parliament for Bogra-3
- In office 28 October 2001 – 24 January 2014
- Preceded by: Abdul Majid Talukdar
- Succeeded by: Nurul Islam Talukder

Personal details
- Born: 29 June 1952
- Died: 28 January 2025 (aged 72)
- Party: Bangladesh Nationalist Party
- Parent: Abdul Majid Talukdar (father)

Abdul Momin Talukder (29 June 1952 – 28 January 2025) was a Bangladesh Nationalist Party (BNP) politician and a Jatiya Sangsad member representing the Bogra-3 constituency during 2001–2014.

In November 2021, Talukder was sentenced to death by the International Crimes Tribunal for his conviction in war crime charges during the Bangladesh Liberation War in 1971.

== Life and career ==
Talukder was born on 29 June 1952. He served as an assistant organising secretary of BNP central committee of the Rajshahi division. He was elected to parliament from Bogra-3 as a BNP candidate in 2001 and 2008 elections. Talukder's father, Abdul Majid Talukdar, represented the same constituency during 1991–2001. In 2018, Talukder's wife, Masuda Momen, was awarded the BNP nomination for Bogra-3 after his brother, Abdul Mohit Talukder, nomination was declared illegal by the Bangladesh High Court. Talukder died on 28 January 2025, at the age of 72.

=== War crime charges and convictions ===
Talukder was sued on 8 March 2011 by Mohammad Subed Ali, a veteran of Bangladesh Liberation war, for war crimes and murder of two Mukti Bahini members during the war. In 2017, warrants were issued against him on war crime charges by the International Crimes Tribunal.

On 25 November 2021, Talukder was sentenced to death by the tribunal for his crimes against humanity. Since he was absconding, he was tried in absentia and faced a total three charges. The tribunal's investigation agency stated that in 1971, Talukder had served as the Razakar commander of Adamdighi Police Station in Bogra and was involved in the killing of at least 19 people.

The charges Talukder was convicted of are:

1. On 22 April 1971, Talukder killed at least 10 people, including a freedom fighter.
2. During 24–27 October 1971, Talukder conducted raids in Kashimala village and looted 16-17 homes and murdered 5 people.
3. On 25 October 1971, Talukder killed four people from Adamdighi's Talshan village.
