= Bogra-3 =

Constituency of Bangladesh's Jatiya Sangsad

Coordinates: 24.82°N 89.04°E

- Constituency for the Jatiya Sangsad
- District: Bogra District
- Division: Rajshahi Division

Current constituency
- Created: 1973
- Party: Bangladesh Nationalist Party
- Member: Md. Abdul Mohit Talukder
- ← 37 Bogra-2 39 Bogra-4 →

Bogra-3 is a constituency represented in the Jatiya Sangsad (National Parliament) of Bangladesh since 2026 by Md. Abdul Mohit Talukder of the Bangladesh Nationalist Party.

== Boundaries ==
The constituency encompasses Adamdighi and Dupchanchia upazilas.

== History ==
The constituency was created for the first general elections in newly independent Bangladesh, held in 1973.

== Members of Parliament ==
Election	Member	Party
1973	Mohammad Hasan Ali Talukder	Awami League
1979	Abdul Majid Talukdar	Bangladesh Nationalist Party
Major Boundary Changes
1986	ABM Shahjahan	Jatiya Samajtantrik Dal (Siraj)
1988	ABM Shahjahan	Jatiya Party
1991	Abdul Majid Talukdar	Bangladesh Nationalist Party
Feb 1996	Golam Mawla	Bangladesh Nationalist Party
Jun 1996	Abdul Majid Talukdar	Bangladesh Nationalist Party
2001	Abdul Momen Talukder	Bangladesh Nationalist Party
2014	Nurul Islam Talukder	Jatiya Party (Ershad)
2024	Khan Muhammad Saifullah Al Mehdi	Independent
2026	Md. Abdul Mohit Talukder	Bangladesh Nationalist Party

== Elections ==
=== Elections in the 2026s ===
General election 2026: Bogra-3
Party	Candidate	Votes	%	±%
BNP	Md. Abdul Mohit Talukder			
Jamaat	Nur Mohammed			
IAB	Md. Shajahan Ali Talukdar			
JP(E)	Md. Sahinul Islam			
Majority				
Turnout				

=== Elections in the 2010s ===
Nurul Islam Talukder was elected unopposed in the 2014 general election after opposition parties withdrew their candidacies in a boycott of the election.

=== Elections in the 2000s ===
General Election 2008: Bogra-3
Party	Candidate	Votes	%	±%
BNP	Abdul Momen Talukder	104,622	49.1	−3.4
Independent	Ansar Ali Mridha	84,276	39.6	+39.4
AL	Golam Mowla	23,995	11.3	−22.4
Majority		20,346	9.6	−9.1
Turnout		212,893	90.0	+3.7
BNP hold				

General Election 2001: Bogra-3
Party	Candidate	Votes	%	±%
BNP	Abdul Momen Talukder	94,533	52.5	+8.7
AL	Golam Mowla	60,764	33.7	+9.6
IJOF	ABM Shahjahan	24,347	13.5	N/A
Independent	Ansar Ali Mridha	343	0.2	N/A
JSD	Md. A. Malek Sarkar	260	0.1	N/A
Majority		33,769	18.7	−0.9
Turnout		180,247	86.3	+0.5
BNP hold				

=== Elections in the 1990s ===
General Election June 1996: Bogra-3
Party	Candidate	Votes	%	±%
BNP	Abdul Majid Talukdar	65,140	43.8	+9.6
AL	Solaiman Ali	35,923	24.1	+2.8
Jamaat	Mofazzal Haque	24,624	16.6	−8.6
JP(E)	ABM Shahjahan	22,276	15.0	−3.7
Zaker Party	Sirazul Islam	528	0.4	+0.1
BKA	Ismail Hossain	296	0.2	−0.1
Independent	Md. Zakil Islam Khan	68	0.0	N/A
Majority		29,217	19.6	+10.6
Turnout		148,855	85.8	+17.8
BNP hold				

General Election 1991: Bogra-3
Party	Candidate	Votes	%	±%
BNP	Abdul Majid Talukdar	40,188	34.2	
Jamaat	Mofazzal Haque	29,563	25.2	
AL	Md. Kasim Uddin	25,051	21.3	
JP(E)	ABM Shahjahan	21,898	18.7	
BKA	Ismail Hossain	355	0.3	
Zaker Party	Md. Mahbubar Rahman Talukder	351	0.3	
Majority		10,625	9.0	
Turnout		117,406	68.0	
BNP gain from JP(E)				
