= List of members of the 12th Jatiya Sangsad =

12th Jatiya Sangsad
←	11th	13th	→
- Flag of the Jatiya Sangsad

Overview
- Legislative body: Bangladesh Parliament
- Term: 30 January 2024 – 5 August 2024
- Election: 2024
- Government: Awami League
- Opposition: Jatiya Party (Ershad)

Sovereign
- President: Mohammed Shahabuddin

House of the Nation
- Speaker: Shirin Sharmin Chaudhury
- Deputy Speaker: Shamsul Hoque Tuku
- Parliament Leader: Sheikh Hasina
- Opposition Leader: GM Quader

The following is a list of Members of Parliament (MPs) elected to the Jatiya Sangsad (National Parliament of Bangladesh) from 300 Bangladeshi constituencies for the 12th Parliament of Bangladesh.

It includes both MPs elected at the 2024 general election, held on 7 January 2024. Nominated women's members for reserved seat and Those subsequently elected in by-elections.

== Members ==
=== Member of Parliament ===
Constituency		Name	Political Party
1	Panchagarh-1	Naimuzzaman Bhuiyan	Awami League
2	Panchagarh-2	Md. Nurul Islam Sujon	Awami League
3	Thakurgaon-1	Ramesh Chandra Sen	Awami League
4	Thakurgaon-2	Mazharul Islam Suzon	Awami League
5	Thakurgaon-3	Hafiz Uddin Ahmed	Jatiya Party (Ershad)
6	Dinajpur-1	Zakaria Zaka	Independent
7	Dinajpur-2	Khalid Mahmud Chowdhury	Awami League
8	Dinajpur-3	Iqbalur Rahim	Awami League
9	Dinajpur-4	Abul Hassan Mahmood Ali	Awami League
10	Dinajpur-5	Mostafizur Rahman Fizar	Awami League
11	Dinajpur-6	Shibli Sadique	Awami League
12	Nilphamari-1	Aftab Uddin Sarkar	Awami League
13	Nilphamari-2	Asaduzzaman Noor	Awami League
14	Nilphamari-3	Saddam Hussain Pavel	Independent
15	Nilphamari-4	Siddiqul Alam Siddiq	Independent
16	Lalmonirhat-1	Motahar Hossain	Awami League
17	Lalmonirhat-2	Nuruzzaman Ahmed	Awami League
18	Lalmonirhat-3	Motiar Rahman	Awami League
19	Rangpur-1	Asaduzzaman Bablu	Independent
20	Rangpur-2	Ahsanul Hoque Chowdhury	Awami League
21	Rangpur-3	GM Quader	Jatiya Party (Ershad)
22	Rangpur-4	Tipu Munshi	Awami League
23	Rangpur-5	Zakir Hossain Sarkar	Independent
24	Rangpur-6	Shirin Sharmin Chaudhury	Awami League
25	Kurigram-1	A.K.M. Mostafizur Rahman	Jatiya Party (Ershad)
26	Kurigram-2	Hamidul Haque Khandker	Independent
27	Kurigram-3	Soumendra Prasad Pandey	Awami League
28	Kurigram-4	Md. Biplab Hasan	Awami League
29	Gaibandha-1	Abdullah Nahid Nigar	Independent
30	Gaibandha-2	Shah Sarwar Kabir	Independent
31	Gaibandha-3	Umme Kulsum Smrity	Awami League
32	Gaibandha-4	Abul Kalam Azad	Awami League
33	Gaibandha-5	Mahmud Hasan Ripon	Awami League
34	Joypurhat-1	Shamsul Alam Dudu	Awami League
35	Joypurhat-2	Abu Sayeed Al Mahmood Swapon	Awami League
36	Bogra-1	Shahadara Mannan Shilpi	Awami League
37	Bogra-2	Shariful Islam Jinnah	Jatiya Party (Ershad)
38	Bogra-3	Khan Muhammad Saifullah Al Mehdi	Independent
39	Bogra-4	A. K. M. Rezaul Karim Tansen	Jatiya Samajtantrik Dal
40	Bogra-5	Md. Mujibur Rahman Majnu	Awami League
41	Bogra-6	Ragebul Ahsan Ripu	Awami League
42	Bogra-7	Mostafa Alam Nannu	Awami League
43	Chapai Nawabganj-1	Shamil Uddin Ahmed Shimul	Awami League
44	Chapai Nawabganj-2	Md. Ziaur Rahman	Awami League
45	Chapai Nawabganj-3	Mohammad Abdul Wadud	Awami League
46	Naogaon-1	Sadhan Chandra Majumder	Awami League
47	Naogaon-2	Shahiduzzaman Sarker	Awami League
48	Naogaon-3	Sourendra Nath Chakraborty	Awami League
49	Naogaon-4	SM Brohani Sultan Mahmud	Independent
50	Naogaon-5	Nizam Uddin Jalil John	Awami League
51	Naogaon-6	Md. Omar Faruk	Independent
52	Rajshahi-1	Omor Faruk Chowdhury	Awami League
53	Rajshahi-2	Shafiqur Rahman Badsha	Independent
54	Rajshahi-3	Md Asaduzzaman Asad	Awami League
55	Rajshahi-4	Abul Kalam Azad	Awami League
56	Rajshahi-5	Abdul Wadud Dara	Awami League
57	Rajshahi-6	Shahriar Alam	Awami League
58	Natore-1	Md. Abul Kalam	Independent
59	Natore-2	Shafiqul Islam Shimul	Awami League
60	Natore-3	Zunaid Ahmed Palak	Awami League
61	Natore-4	Siddiqur Rahman Patwari	Awami League
62	Sirajganj-1	Tanvir Shakil Joy	Awami League
63	Sirajganj-2	Jannat Ara Henry	Awami League
64	Sirajganj-3	Abdul Aziz	Awami League
65	Sirajganj-4	Md. Shafiqul Islam	Awami League
66	Sirajganj-5	Abdul Momin Mondol	Awami League
67	Sirajganj-6	Choyon Islam	Awami League
68	Pabna-1	Shamsul Hoque Tuku	Awami League
69	Pabna-2	Ahmed Firoz Kabir	Awami League
70	Pabna-3	Md. Mokbul Hossain	Awami League
71	Pabna-4	Galibur Rahman Sherif	Awami League
72	Pabna-5	Golam Faruk Khandakar Prince	Awami League
73	Meherpur-1	Farhad Hossain	Awami League
74	Meherpur-2	Abu Saleh Mohammad Nazmul Huq	Awami League
75	Kushtia-1	Rezaul Haque Chowdhury	Independent
76	Kushtia-2	Kamarul Arefin	Independent
77	Kushtia-3	Mahbubul Alam Hanif	Awami League
78	Kushtia-4	Abdur Rouf	Independent
79	Chuadanga-1	Solaiman Haque Joarder	Awami League
80	Chuadanga-2	Md. Ali Azgar	Awami League
81	Jhenaidah-1	Abdul Hyee Died: 16 March 2024	Awami League
81	Jhenaidah-1	Md Nayeb Ali Joarder By-election: 18 May 2024	Awami League
82	Jhenaidah-2	Md. Nasser Shahrear Zahedee Mohul	Independent
83	Jhenaidah-3	Salahuddin Miaji	Awami League
84	Jhenaidah-4	Md. Anwarul Azim Anar Murdered: 13 May 2024 (disclosed)	Awami League
85	Jessore-1	Sheikh Afil Uddin	Awami League
86	Jessore-2	Md Towhiduzzaman	Awami League
87	Jessore-3	Kazi Nabil Ahmed	Awami League
88	Jessore-4	Enamul Haque Babul	Awami League
89	Jessore-5	Mohammad Yakub Ali	Independent
90	Jessore-6	Md Azizul Islam	Independent
91	Magura-1	Shakib Al Hasan	Awami League
92	Magura-2	Biren Sikder	Awami League
93	Narail-1	Md. Kabirul Haque	Awami League
94	Narail-2	Mashrafe Mortaza	Awami League
95	Bagerhat-1	Sheikh Helal Uddin	Awami League
96	Bagerhat-2	Sheikh Tonmoy	Awami League
97	Bagerhat-3	Habibun Nahar	Awami League
98	Bagerhat-4	HM Badiuzzaman Sohag	Awami League
99	Khulna-1	Nani Gopal Mandal	Awami League
100	Khulna-2	Sheikh Salahuddin Jewel	Awami League
101	Khulna-3	SM Kamal Hossain	Awami League
102	Khulna-4	Abdus Salam Murshedy	Awami League
103	Khulna-5	Narayon Chandra Chanda	Awami League
104	Khulna-6	Md. Rashiduzzaman	Awami League
105	Satkhira-1	Feroz Ahammed Shapon	Awami League
106	Satkhira-2	Ashrafuzzaman Ashu	Jatiya Party (Ershad)
107	Satkhira-3	AFM Ruhal Haque	Awami League
108	Satkhira-4	S. M. Ataul Haque	Awami League
109	Barguna-1	Golam Sarwar Tuku	Independent
110	Barguna-2	Sultana Nadira	Awami League
111	Patuakhali-1	A.B.M. Ruhul Amin Howlader	Jatiya Party (Ershad)
112	Patuakhali-2	A. S. M. Feroz	Awami League
113	Patuakhali-3	SM Shahjada	Awami League
114	Patuakhali-4	Muhibur Rahman Muhib	Awami League
115	Bhola-1	Tofail Ahmed	Awami League
116	Bhola-2	Ali Azam	Awami League
117	Bhola-3	Nurunnabi Chowdhury Shaon	Awami League
118	Bhola-4	Abdullah Al Islam Jakob	Awami League
119	Barisal-1	Abul Hasanat Abdullah	Awami League
120	Barisal-2	Rashed Khan Menon	Workers Party of Bangladesh
121	Barisal-3	Golam Kibria Tipu	Jatiya Party (Ershad)
122	Barisal-4	Pankaj Nath	Independent
123	Barisal-5	Zaheed Farooque	Awami League
124	Barisal-6	Abdul Hafiz Mallik	Awami League
125	Jhalokati-1	Shahjahan Omar	Awami League
126	Jhalokati-2	Amir Hossain Amu	Awami League
127	Pirojpur-1	SM Rezaul Karim	Awami League
128	Pirojpur-2	Mohiuddin Maharaj	Independent
129	Pirojpur-3	Shamim Shahnawaz	Independent
130	Tangail-1	Mohammad Abdur Razzaque	Awami League
131	Tangail-2	Soto Monir	Awami League
132	Tangail-3	Amanur Rahman Khan Rana	Independent
133	Tangail-4	Abdul Latif Siddiqui	Independent
134	Tangail-5	Md. Sanowar Hossain	Independent
135	Tangail-6	Ahasanul Islam Titu	Awami League
136	Tangail-7	Khan Ahmed Shuvo	Awami League
137	Tangail-8	Anupam Shahjahan Joy	Awami League
138	Jamalpur-1	Nur Mohammad	Awami League
139	Jamalpur-2	Faridul Haq Khan	Awami League
140	Jamalpur-3	Mirza Azam	Awami League
141	Jamalpur-4	Abdur Rashid	Independent
142	Jamalpur-5	Md Abul Kalam Azad	Awami League
143	Sherpur-1	Chanuar Hossain Chanu	Independent
144	Sherpur-2	Matia Chowdhury	Awami League
145	Sherpur-3	A.D.M Shahidul Islam	Awami League
146	Mymensingh-1	Mahmudul Haque Sayem	Independent
147	Mymensingh-2	Sharif Ahmed	Awami League
148	Mymensingh-3	Nilufar Anjum Poppy	Awami League
149	Mymensingh-4	Mohit Ur Rahman Shanto	Awami League
150	Mymensingh-5	Nazrul Islam	Independent
151	Mymensingh-6	Malek Sarkar	Independent
152	Mymensingh-7	ABM Anisuzzaman	Independent
153	Mymensingh-8	Mahmud Hasan Sumon	Independent
154	Mymensingh-9	Abdus Salam	Awami League
155	Mymensingh-10	Fahmi Gulandaz Babel	Awami League
156	Mymensingh-11	Mohammad Abdul Waheed	Independent
157	Netrokona-1	Mustaque Ahmed Ruhi	Awami League
158	Netrokona-2	Ashraf Ali Khan Khasru	Awami League
159	Netrokona-3	Iftiquar Uddin Talukder Pintu	Independent
160	Netrokona-4	Sajjadul Hassan	Awami League
161	Netrokona-5	Ahmad Hossain	Awami League
162	Kishoreganj-1	Syeda Zakia Noor Lipi	Awami League
163	Kishoreganj-2	Md. Suhrab Uddin	Independent
164	Kishoreganj-3	Mujibul Haque	Jatiya Party (Ershad)
165	Kishoreganj-4	Rejwan Ahammad Taufiq	Awami League
166	Kishoreganj-5	Md. Afzal Hossain	Awami League
167	Kishoreganj-6	Nazmul Hassan	Awami League
168	Manikganj-1	Salauddin Mahmud	Independent
169	Manikganj-2	Dewan Zahid Ahmed Tulu	Independent
170	Manikganj-3	Zahid Maleque	Awami League
171	Munshiganj-1	Mohiuddin Ahmed	Awami League
172	Munshiganj-2	Sagufta Yasmin Emily	Awami League
173	Munshiganj-3	Mohammad Faisal Biplob	Independent
174	Dhaka-1	Salman F Rahman	Awami League
175	Dhaka-2	Qamrul Islam	Awami League
176	Dhaka-3	Nasrul Hamid	Awami League
177	Dhaka-4	Aolad Hossain	Independent
178	Dhaka-5	Moshiur Rahman Mollah	Independent
179	Dhaka-6	Sayeed Khokon	Awami League
180	Dhaka-7	Mohammad Solaiman Salim	Awami League
181	Dhaka-8	AFM Bahauddin Nasim	Awami League
182	Dhaka-9	Saber Hossain Chowdhury	Awami League
183	Dhaka-10	Ferdous Ahmed	Awami League
184	Dhaka-11	Md Wakil Uddin	Awami League
185	Dhaka-12	Asaduzzaman Khan	Awami League
186	Dhaka-13	Jahangir Kabir Nanak	Awami League
187	Dhaka-14	Md Mainul Hossain Khan Nikhil	Awami League
188	Dhaka-15	Kamal Ahmed Majumder	Awami League
189	Dhaka-16	Elias Mollah	Awami League
190	Dhaka-17	Mohammad A. Arafat	Awami League
191	Dhaka-18	Khosru Chowdhury	Independent
192	Dhaka-19	Mohammad Saiful Islam	Independent
193	Dhaka-20	Benzir Ahmed	Awami League
194	Gazipur-1	AKM Mozammel Haque	Awami League
195	Gazipur-2	Zahid Ahsan Russel	Awami League
196	Gazipur-3	Rumana Ali	Awami League
197	Gazipur-4	Simeen Hussain Rimi	Awami League
198	Gazipur-5	Akhtaruzzaman	Independent
199	Narsingdi-1	Muhammad Nazrul Islam	Awami League
200	Narsingdi-2	Anwarul Ashraf Khan	Awami League
201	Narsingdi-3	Md. Shirajul Islam Mollah	Independent
202	Narsingdi-4	Nurul Majid Mahmud Humayun	Awami League
203	Narsingdi-5	Rajiuddin Ahmed Raju	Awami League
204	Narayanganj-1	Golam Dastagir Gazi	Awami League
205	Narayanganj-2	Nazrul Islam Babu	Awami League
206	Narayanganj-3	Abdullah-Al-Kaisar	Awami League
207	Narayanganj-4	Shamim Osman	Awami League
208	Narayanganj-5	Salim Osman	Jatiya Party (Ershad)
209	Rajbari-1	Kazi Keramat Ali	Awami League
210	Rajbari-2	Md. Zillul Hakim	Awami League
211	Faridpur-1	Abdur Rahman	Awami League
212	Faridpur-2	Shahdab Akbar Chowdhury	Awami League
213	Faridpur-3	Abdul Kader Azad	Independent
214	Faridpur-4	Mujibur Rahman Chowdhury	Independent
215	Gopalganj-1	Faruk Khan	Awami League
216	Gopalganj-2	Sheikh Selim	Awami League
217	Gopalganj-3	Sheikh Hasina	Awami League
218	Madaripur-1	Noor-E-Alam Chowdhury Liton	Awami League
219	Madaripur-2	Shajahan Khan	Awami League
220	Madaripur-3	Mst. Tahmina Begum	Independent
221	Shariatpur-1	Iqbal Hossain Apu	Awami League
222	Shariatpur-2	AKM Enamul Haque Shamim	Awami League
223	Shariatpur-3	Nahim Razzaq	Awami League
224	Sunamganj-1	Ranjit Chandra Sarkar	Awami League
225	Sunamganj-2	Joya Sengupta	Independent
226	Sunamganj-3	Muhammad Abdul Mannan	Awami League
227	Sunamganj-4	Mohammad Sadique	Awami League
228	Sunamganj-5	Mohibur Rahman Manik	Awami League
229	Sylhet-1	AK Abdul Momen	Awami League
230	Sylhet-2	Shafiqur Rahaman Chowdhury	Awami League
231	Sylhet-3	Habibur Rahman Habib	Awami League
232	Sylhet-4	Imran Ahmad	Awami League
233	Sylhet-5	Husam Uddin Chowdhury Fultali	Independent
234	Sylhet-6	Nurul Islam Nahid	Awami League
235	Moulvibazar-1	Md. Shahab Uddin	Awami League
236	Moulvibazar-2	Shafiul Alam Chowdhury Nadel	Awami League
237	Moulvibazar-3	Mohammad Zillur Rahman	Awami League
238	Moulvibazar-4	Md. Abdus Shahid	Awami League
239	Habiganj-1	Amatul Kibria Keya Chowdhury	Independent
240	Habiganj-2	Moyez Uddin Sharif Ruel	Awami League
241	Habiganj-3	Md. Abu Zahir	Awami League
242	Habiganj-4	Syed Sayedul Haque Suman	Independent
243	Brahmanbaria-1	SAK Ekramuzzaman Sukhan	Independent
244	Brahmanbaria-2	Moin Uddin	Independent
245	Brahmanbaria-3	R. A. M. Obaidul Muktadir Chowdhury	Awami League
246	Brahmanbaria-4	Anisul Huq	Awami League
247	Brahmanbaria-5	Fayzur Rahman	Awami League
248	Brahmanbaria-6	A. B. Tajul Islam	Awami League
249	Comilla-1	Abdus Sabur	Awami League
250	Comilla-2	Abdul Majeed	Independent
251	Comilla-3	Jahangir Alam Sarkar	Independent
252	Comilla-4	Abul Kalam Azad	Independent
253	Comilla-5	M. A. Zaher	Independent
254	Comilla-6	A. K. M. Bahauddin	Awami League
255	Comilla-7	Pran Gopal Datta	Awami League
256	Comilla-8	A.Z.M. Shafiuddin Shamim	Awami League
257	Comilla-9	Md Tazul Islam	Awami League
258	Comilla-10	A. H. M. Mustafa Kamal	Awami League
259	Comilla-11	Mujibul Haque Mujib	Awami League
260	Chandpur-1	Salim Mahmud	Awami League
261	Chandpur-2	Mofazzal Hossain Chowdhury	Awami League
262	Chandpur-3	Dipu Moni	Awami League
263	Chandpur-4	Muhammad Shafiqur Rahman	Awami League
264	Chandpur-5	Rafiqul Islam	Awami League
265	Feni-1	Alauddin Ahmed Chowdhury	Awami League
266	Feni-2	Nizam Uddin Hazari	Awami League
267	Feni-3	Masud Uddin Chowdhury	Jatiya Party (Ershad)
268	Noakhali-1	H. M. Ibrahim	Awami League
269	Noakhali-2	Morshed Alam	Awami League
270	Noakhali-3	Mamunur Rashid Kiron	Awami League
271	Noakhali-4	Ekramul Karim Chowdhury	Awami League
272	Noakhali-5	Obaidul Quader	Awami League
273	Noakhali-6	Mohammad Ali	Awami League
274	Lakshmipur-1	Anwar Hossain Khan	Awami League
275	Lakshmipur-2	Nuruddin Chowdhury Noyon	Awami League
276	Lakshmipur-3	Golam Faruque Pinku	Awami League
277	Lakshmipur-4	Mohammad Abdullah	Independent
278	Chittagong-1	Mahboob Rahman Ruhel	Awami League
279	Chittagong-2	Khadizatul Anwar	Awami League
280	Chittagong-3	Mahfuzur Rahaman	Awami League
281	Chittagong-4	SM Al Mamun	Awami League
282	Chittagong-5	Anisul Islam Mahmud	Jatiya Party (Ershad)
283	Chittagong-6	A. B. M. Fazle Karim Chowdhury	Awami League
284	Chittagong-7	Hasan Mahmud	Awami League
285	Chittagong-8	Abdus Salam	Independent
286	Chittagong-9	Mohibul Hasan Chowdhury Nowfel	Awami League
287	Chittagong-10	Md Mohiuddin Bacchu	Awami League
288	Chittagong-11	M. Abdul Latif	Awami League
289	Chittagong-12	Motaherul Islam Chowdhury	Awami League
290	Chittagong-13	Saifuzzaman Chowdhury	Awami League
291	Chittagong-14	Md. Nazrul Islam Chowdhury	Awami League
292	Chittagong-15	Abdul Motaleb	Independent
293	Chittagong-16	Mujibur Rahman	Independent
294	Cox's Bazar-1	Syed Muhammad Ibrahim	Bangladesh Kalyan Party
295	Cox's Bazar-2	Asheq Ullah Rafiq	Awami League
296	Cox's Bazar-3	Shaimum Sarwar Kamal	Awami League
297	Cox's Bazar-4	Shahin Akhtar Bodi	Awami League
298	Khagrachari	Kujendra Lal Tripura	Awami League
299	Rangamati	Dipankar Talukdar	Awami League
300	Bandarban	Bir Bahadur Ushwe Sing	Awami League

=== Member of Reserved Women's Seat ===
Women's Seat		Name	Political Party
301	Women's Seat-1	Rezia Islam	Awami League
302	Women's Seat-2	Drowpodi Dabi Agarwala	Awami League
303	Women's Seat-3	Ashika Sultana	Awami League
304	Women's Seat-4	Nachima Zaman Bobby	Awami League
305	Women's Seat-5	Rokeya Sultana	Awami League
306	Women's Seat-6	Mahafuza Sultana	Awami League
307	Women's Seat-7	Zara Jabeen Mahbub	Awami League
308	Women's Seat-8	Kohale Quddus	Awami League
309	Women's Seat-9	Parvin Zaman Kalpana	Awami League
310	Women's Seat-10	Farida Akter Banu	Awami League
311	Women's Seat-11	Monnujan Sufian	Awami League
312	Women's Seat-12	Runu Reza	Awami League
313	Women's Seat-13	Laila Parveen	Awami League
314	Women's Seat-14	Farjana Sumi	Awami League
315	Women's Seat-15	Najneen Nahar Rashid	Awami League
316	Women's Seat-16	Khaleda Bahar Beauty	Awami League
317	Women's Seat-17	Shammi Ahmed	Awami League
318	Women's Seat-18	Tarana Halim	Awami League
319	Women's Seat-19	Shamshun Nahar Chapa	Awami League
320	Women's Seat-20	Aparajita Haque	Awami League
321	Women's Seat-21	Ummi Farzana Sattar	Awami League
322	Women's Seat-22	Nadia Binte Amin	Awami League
323	Women's Seat-23	Fazilatun Nessa Indira	Awami League
324	Women's Seat-24	Shabnam Jahan	Awami League
325	Women's Seat-25	Parul Akhtar	Awami League
326	Women's Seat-26	Sabera Begum	Awami League
327	Women's Seat-27	Naheed Ezaher Khan	Awami League
328	Women's Seat-28	Shahida Tareque Dipti	Awami League
329	Women's Seat-29	Anima Mukti Gomez	Awami League
330	Women's Seat-30	Sheikh Anar Koli Putul	Awami League
331	Women's Seat-31	Hasina Bari Chowdhury	Awami League
332	Women's Seat-32	Sanjida Khanam	Awami League
333	Women's Seat-33	Meher Afroz Chumki	Awami League
334	Women's Seat-34	Masuda Siddique Roji	Awami League
335	Women's Seat-35	Farida Yasmin	Awami League
336	Women's Seat-36	Jharna Hasan	Awami League
337	Women's Seat-37	Nazma Akhter	Awami League
338	Women's Seat-38	Bedowra Ahmed Salam	Awami League
339	Women's Seat-39	Ruma Chakraborty	Awami League
340	Women's Seat-40	Aroma Dutta	Awami League
341	Women's Seat-41	Kanon Ara Begum	Awami League
342	Women's Seat-42	Farida Khanam	Awami League
343	Women's Seat-43	Faridun Nahar Laily	Awami League
344	Women's Seat-44	Ashrafun Nesha	Awami League
345	Women's Seat-45	Shamima Harun Lubna	Awami League
346	Women's Seat-46	Dilwara Yousuf	Awami League
347	Women's Seat-47	Waseqa Ayesha Khan	Awami League
348	Women's Seat-48	Jarati Tanchangya	Awami League
349	Women's Seat-49	Salma Islam	Jatiya Party (Ershad)
350	Women's Seat-50	Nurunnahar Begum	Jatiya Party (Ershad)
