= List of members of the 10th Jatiya Sangsad =

10th Jatiya Sangsad
←	9th	11th	→
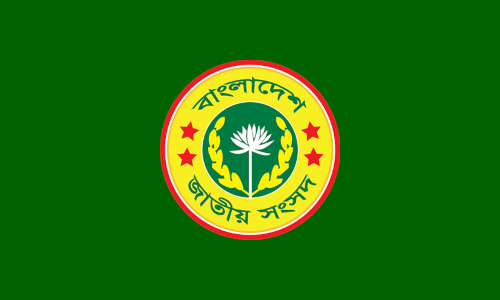
- Flag of the Jatiya Sangsad

Overview
- Legislative body: Bangladesh Parliament
- Term: 29 January 2014 – 28 January 2019
- Election: 2014
- Government: Awami League
- Opposition: Jatiya Party (Ershad)

Sovereign
- President: Mohammad Abdul Hamid

House of the Nation
- Speaker: Shirin Sharmin Chaudhury
- Deputy Speaker: Fazle Rabbi Miah
- Leader of the House: Sheikh Hasina
- Leader of the Opposition: Rowshan Ershad

The following is a list of Members of Parliament (MPs) elected to the Jatiya Sangsad (National Parliament of Bangladesh) from 300 Bangladeshi constituencies for the 10th Parliament of Bangladesh. It includes both MPs elected at the 2014 general election, held on 5 January 2014. Nominated women's members for reserved seat and Those subsequently elected in by-elections.

== Members ==
=== Member of Parliament ===
Constituency		Name	Party
1	Panchagarh-1	Nazmul Haque Prodhan	Jatiya Samajtantrik Dal
2	Panchagarh-2	Md. Nurul Islam Sujon	Awami League
3	Thakurgaon-1	Ramesh Chandra Sen	Awami League
4	Thakurgaon-2	Dabirul Islam	Awami League
5	Thakurgaon-3	Yeasin Ali	Workers Party of Bangladesh
6	Dinajpur-1	Manoranjan Shill Gopal	Awami League
7	Dinajpur-2	Khalid Mahmud Chowdhury	Awami League
8	Dinajpur-3	Iqbalur Rahim	Awami League
9	Dinajpur-4	Abul Hassan Mahmood Ali	Awami League
10	Dinajpur-5	Mostafizur Rahman Fizar	Awami League
11	Dinajpur-6	Shibli Sadique	Awami League
12	Nilphamari-1	Aftab Uddin Sarkar	Awami League
13	Nilphamari-2	Asaduzzaman Noor	Awami League
14	Nilphamari-3	Golam Mostofa	Awami League
15	Nilphamari-4	Shawkat Chowdhury	Jatiya Party (Ershad)
16	Lalmonirhat-1	Motahar Hossain	Awami League
17	Lalmonirhat-2	Nuruzzaman Ahmed	Awami League
18	Lalmonirhat-3	Abu Saleh Mohammad Saeed	Awami League
19	Rangpur-1	Mashiur Rahaman Ranga	Jatiya Party (Ershad)
20	Rangpur-2	Abul Kalam Md. Ahsanul Haque Chowdhury	Awami League
21	Rangpur-3	Hussain Muhammad Ershad	Jatiya Party (Ershad)
22	Rangpur-4	Tipu Munshi	Awami League
23	Rangpur-5	H. N. Ashequr Rahman	Awami League
24	Rangpur-6	Shirin Sharmin Chowdhury By-election: 28 January 2014	Awami League
25	Kurigram-1	A.K.M. Mostafizur Rahman	Jatiya Party (Ershad)
26	Kurigram-2	Tajul Islam Choudhury Died: 13 August 2018	Jatiya Party (Ershad)
27	Kurigram-3	AKM Maidul Islam Died: 11 May 2018	Jatiya Party (Ershad)
27	Kurigram-3	Akkas Ali By-election: 25 July 2018	Jatiya Party (Ershad)
28	Kurigram-4	Ruhul Amin	Jatiya Party (Manju)
29	Gaibandha-1	Manjurul Islam Liton Assassinated: 31 December 2016	Awami League
29	Gaibandha-1	Golam Mostafa Ahmed By-election: 22 March 2017; Died: 19 December 2017	Awami League
29	Gaibandha-1	Shamim Haider Patwary By-election: 13 March 2018	Jatiya Party (Ershad)
30	Gaibandha-2	Mahabub Ara Begum Gini	Awami League
31	Gaibandha-3	Eunus Ali Sarkar	Awami League
32	Gaibandha-4	Abul Kalam Azad	Independent
33	Gaibandha-5	Fazle Rabbi Miah	Awami League
34	Joypurhat-1	Shamsul Alam Dudu	Awami League
35	Joypurhat-2	Abu Sayeed Al Mahmood Swapon	Awami League
36	Bogra-1	Abdul Mannan	Awami League
37	Bogra-2	Shariful Islam Jinnah	Jatiya Party (Ershad)
38	Bogra-3	Nurul Islam Talukder	Jatiya Party (Ershad)
39	Bogra-4	A. K. M. Rezaul Karim Tansen	Jatiya Samajtantrik Dal
40	Bogra-5	Habibar Rahman	Awami League
41	Bogra-6	Nurul Islam Omar	Jatiya Party (Ershad)
42	Bogra-7	Altaf Ali	Jatiya Party (Ershad)
43	Chapai Nawabganj-1	Md. Golam Rabbani	Awami League
44	Chapai Nawabganj-2	Md. Golam Mostofa Biswas	Awami League
45	Chapai Nawabganj-3	Md. Abdul Odud	Awami League
46	Naogaon-1	Sadhan Chandra Majumder	Awami League
47	Naogaon-2	Shahiduzzaman Sarker	Awami League
48	Naogaon-3	Salim Uddin Tarafder	Independent
49	Naogaon-4	Emaz Uddin Pramanik	Awami League
50	Naogaon-5	Md. Abdul Maleque	Awami League
51	Naogaon-6	Israfil Alam	Awami League
52	Rajshahi-1	Omor Faruk Chowdhury	Awami League
53	Rajshahi-2	Fazle Hossain Badsha	Workers Party of Bangladesh
54	Rajshahi-3	Ayeen Uddin	Awami League
55	Rajshahi-4	Enamul Haque	Awami League
56	Rajshahi-5	Abdul Wadud Dara	Awami League
57	Rajshahi-6	Shahriar Alam	Awami League
58	Natore-1	Md. Abul Kalam	Awami League
59	Natore-2	Shafiqul Islam Shimul	Awami League
60	Natore-3	Zunaid Ahmed Palak	Awami League
61	Natore-4	Abdul Quddus	Awami League
62	Sirajganj-1	Mohammed Nasim	Awami League
63	Sirajganj-2	Habibe Millat	Awami League
64	Sirajganj-3	Ishaque Hossain Talukder Died: 6 October 2014	Awami League
64	Sirajganj-3	Gazi M M Amjad Hossain By-election: 30 November 2014	Awami League
65	Sirajganj-4	Tanveer Imam	Awami League
66	Sirajganj-5	Abdul Majid Mandal	Awami League
67	Sirajganj-6	Hashibur Rahman Swapon	Awami League
68	Pabna-1	Shamsul Haque Tuku	Awami League
69	Pabna-2	Azizul Huq Arzu	Awami League
70	Pabna-3	Md. Mokbul Hossain	Awami League
71	Pabna-4	Shamsur Rahman Sherif	Awami League
72	Pabna-5	Golam Faruk Khandakar Prince	Awami League
73	Meherpur-1	Farhad Hossain	Awami League
74	Meherpur-2	Md. Mokbul Hossain	Independent
75	Kushtia-1	Rezaul Haque Chowdhury	Independent
76	Kushtia-2	Hasanul Haq Inu	Jatiya Samajtantrik Dal
77	Kushtia-3	Mahbubul Alam Hanif	Awami League
78	Kushtia-4	Abdur Rouf	Awami League
79	Chuadanga-1	Solaiman Haque Joarder	Awami League
80	Chuadanga-2	Md. Ali Azgar	Awami League
81	Jhenaidah-1	Abdul Hyee	Awami League
82	Jhenaidah-2	Tahjib Alam Siddique	Independent
83	Jhenaidah-3	Md. Nobi Newaz	Awami League
84	Jhenaidah-4	Anwarul Azim Anar	Awami League
85	Jessore-1	Sheikh Afil Uddin	Awami League
86	Jessore-2	Mohammad Monirul Islam	Awami League
87	Jessore-3	Kazi Nabil Ahmed	Awami League
88	Jessore-4	Ranajit Kumar Roy	Awami League
89	Jessore-5	Swapan Bhattacharjee	Independent
90	Jessore-6	Ismat Ara Sadek	Awami League
91	Magura-1	Muhammad Serajul Akbar Died: 9 March 2015	Awami League
91	Magura-1	A. T. M. Abdul Wahab By-election: 30 May 2015	Awami League
92	Magura-2	Biren Sikder	Awami League
93	Narail-1	Md. Kabirul Haque	Awami League
94	Narail-2	Sheikh Hafizur Rahman	Workers Party of Bangladesh
95	Bagerhat-1	Sheikh Helal	Awami League
96	Bagerhat-2	Mir Showkat Ali Badsha	Awami League
97	Bagerhat-3	Talukder Abdul Khaleque Resigned: 10 April 2018	Awami League
97	Bagerhat-3	Habibun Nahar By-election: 4 June 2018	Awami League
98	Bagerhat-4	Mozammel Hossain	Awami League
99	Khulna-1	Panchanan Biswas	Awami League
100	Khulna-2	Mohammad Mizanur Rahman	Awami League
101	Khulna-3	Monnujan Sufian	Awami League
102	Khulna-4	Mostafa Rashidi Suja Died: 26 July 2018	Awami League
102	Khulna-4	Salam Murshedy By-election: 4 September 2018	Awami League
103	Khulna-5	Narayon Chandra Chanda	Awami League
104	Khulna-6	Sheikh Md. Nurul Haque	Awami League
105	Satkhira-1	Mustafa Lutfullah	Workers Party of Bangladesh
106	Satkhira-2	Mir Mostaque Ahmed Robi	Awami League
107	Satkhira-3	AFM Ruhal Haque	Awami League
108	Satkhira-4	S. M. Jaglul Hayder	Awami League
109	Barguna-1	Dhirendra Debnath Shambhu	Awami League
110	Barguna-2	Showkat Hasanur Rahman Rimon	Awami League
111	Patuakhali-1	A.B.M. Ruhul Amin Howlader	Jatiya Party (Ershad)
112	Patuakhali-2	A. S. M. Feroz	Awami League
113	Patuakhali-3	AKM Jahangir Hossain	Awami League
114	Patuakhali-4	Md. Mahbubur Rahman Talukdar	Awami League
115	Bhola-1	Tofail Ahmed	Awami League
116	Bhola-2	Ali Azam	Awami League
117	Bhola-3	Nurunnabi Chowdhury Shaon	Awami League
118	Bhola-4	Abdullah Al Islam Jakob	Awami League
119	Barisal-1	Abul Hasanat Abdullah	Awami League
120	Barisal-2	Talukder Mohammad Yunus	Awami League
121	Barisal-3	Tipu Sultan	Workers Party of Bangladesh
122	Barisal-4	Pankaj Nath	Awami League
123	Barisal-5	Shawkat Hossain Hiron Died: 9 April 2014	Awami League
123	Barisal-5	Jebunnesa Afroz By-election: 15 June 2014	Awami League
124	Barisal-6	Nasreen Jahan Ratna	Jatiya Party (Ershad)
125	Jhalokati-1	Bazlul Haque Haroon	Awami League
126	Jhalokati-2	Amir Hossain Amu	Awami League
127	Pirojpur-1	A. K. M. A. Awal Saydur Rahman	Awami League
128	Pirojpur-2	Anwar Hossain Manju	Jatiya Party (Manju)
129	Pirojpur-3	Md. Rustum Ali Faraji	Independent
130	Tangail-1	Mohammad Abdur Razzaque	Awami League
131	Tangail-2	Khandaker Asaduzzaman	Awami League
132	Tangail-3	Amanur Rahman Khan	Awami League
133	Tangail-4	Abdul Latif Siddiqui Resigned: 1 September 2015	Awami League
133	Tangail-4	Hasan Imam Khan Sohel Hazari By-election: 31 January 2017	Awami League
134	Tangail-5	Md. Sanowar Hossain	Awami League
135	Tangail-6	Khandaker Abdul Baten	Awami League
136	Tangail-7	Md. Akabbar Hossain	Awami League
137	Tangail-8	Shawkat Momen Shahjahan Died: 20 January 2014	Awami League
137	Tangail-8	Anupam Shahjahan Joy By-election: 29 March 2014	Awami League
138	Jamalpur-1	Abul Kalam Azad	Awami League
139	Jamalpur-2	Md. Faridul Haq Khan	Awami League
140	Jamalpur-3	Mirza Azam	Awami League
141	Jamalpur-4	Md. Mamunoor Rashid	Jatiya Party (Ershad)
142	Jamalpur-5	Rezaul Karim Hira	Awami League
143	Sherpur-1	Md. Atiur Rahman Atik	Awami League
144	Sherpur-2	Matia Chowdhury	Awami League
145	Sherpur-3	AKM Fazlul Haque	Awami League
146	Mymensingh-1	Promode Mankin Died: 11 May 2016	Awami League
146	Mymensingh-1	Jewel Areng By-election: 18 July 2016	Awami League
147	Mymensingh-2	Sharif Ahmed	Awami League
148	Mymensingh-3	Mozibur Rahman Fakir Died: 2 May 2016	Awami League
148	Mymensingh-3	Nazim Uddin Ahmed By-election: 18 July 2016	Awami League
149	Mymensingh-4	Rowshan Ershad	Jatiya Party (Ershad)
150	Mymensingh-5	Salahuddin Ahmed Mukti	Jatiya Party (Ershad)
151	Mymensingh-6	Moslem Uddin	Awami League
152	Mymensingh-7	M. A. Hannan	Jatiya Party (Ershad)
153	Mymensingh-8	Fakhrul Imam	Jatiya Party (Ershad)
154	Mymensingh-9	Anwarul Abedin Khan	Awami League
155	Mymensingh-10	Fahmi Gulandaz Babel	Awami League
156	Mymensingh-11	Mohammed Amanullah	Awami League
157	Netrokona-1	Chobi Biswas	Awami League
158	Netrokona-2	Arif Khan Joy	Awami League
159	Netrokona-3	Iftiquar Uddin Talukder Pintu	Awami League
160	Netrokona-4	Rebecca Momin	Awami League
161	Netrokona-5	Waresat Hussain Belal	Awami League
162	Kishoreganj-1	Sayed Ashraful Islam	Awami League
163	Kishoreganj-2	Md. Suhrab Uddin	Awami League
164	Kishoreganj-3	Mujibul Haque Chunnu	Jatiya Party (Ershad)
165	Kishoreganj-4	Rejwan Ahammad Taufiq	Awami League
166	Kishoreganj-5	Md. Afzal Hossain	Awami League
167	Kishoreganj-6	Nazmul Hassan Papon	Awami League
168	Manikganj-1	Naimur Rahman Durjoy	Awami League
169	Manikganj-2	Momtaz Begum	Awami League
170	Manikganj-3	Zahid Maleque	Awami League
171	Munshiganj-1	Sukumar Ranjan Ghosh	Awami League
172	Munshiganj-2	Sagufta Yasmin Emily	Awami League
173	Munshiganj-3	Mrinal Kanti Das	Awami League
174	Dhaka-1	Salma Islam	Jatiya Party (Ershad)
175	Dhaka-2	Qamrul Islam	Awami League
176	Dhaka-3	Nasrul Hamid	Awami League
177	Dhaka-4	Sayed Abu Hossain Babla	Jatiya Party (Ershad)
178	Dhaka-5	Habibur Rahman Mollah	Awami League
179	Dhaka-6	Kazi Firoz Rashid	Jatiya Party (Ershad)
180	Dhaka-7	Haji Salim	Independent
181	Dhaka-8	Rashed Khan Menon	Workers Party of Bangladesh
182	Dhaka-9	Saber Hossain Chowdhury	Awami League
183	Dhaka-10	Sheikh Fazle Noor Taposh	Awami League
184	Dhaka-11	A.K.M. Rahmatullah	Awami League
185	Dhaka-12	Asaduzzaman Khan	Awami League
186	Dhaka-13	Jahangir Kabir Nanak	Awami League
187	Dhaka-14	Aslamul Haque	Awami League
188	Dhaka-15	Kamal Ahmed Majumder	Awami League
189	Dhaka-16	Elias Uddin Mollah	Awami League
190	Dhaka-17	S.M. Abul Kalam Azad	Bangladesh Nationalist Front
191	Dhaka-18	Sahara Khatun	Awami League
192	Dhaka-19	Md. Enamur Rahaman	Awami League
193	Dhaka-20	M. A. Maleque	Awami League
194	Gazipur-1	AKM Mozammel Haque	Awami League
195	Gazipur-2	Zahid Ahsan Russel	Awami League
196	Gazipur-3	Md. Rahamat Ali	Awami League
197	Gazipur-4	Simeen Hussain Rimi	Awami League
198	Gazipur-5	Meher Afroz Chumki	Awami League
199	Narsingdi-1	Muhammad Nazrul Islam	Awami League
200	Narsingdi-2	Kamrul Asraf Khan	Independent
201	Narsingdi-3	Md. Shirajul Islam Mollah	Independent
202	Narsingdi-4	Nurul Majid Mahmud Humayun	Awami League
203	Narsingdi-5	Rajiuddin Ahmed Raju	Awami League
204	Narayanganj-1	Golam Dastagir Gazi	Awami League
205	Narayanganj-2	Nazrul Islam Babu	Awami League
206	Narayanganj-3	Liyakot Hossain Khoka	Jatiya Party (Ershad)
207	Narayanganj-4	Shamim Osman	Awami League
208	Narayanganj-5	Nasim Osman Died: 30 April 2014	Jatiya Party (Ershad)
208	Narayanganj-5	Salim Osman By-election: 26 June 2014	Jatiya Party (Ershad)
209	Rajbari-1	Kazi Keramat Ali	Awami League
210	Rajbari-2	Zillul Hakim	Awami League
211	Faridpur-1	Abdur Rahman	Awami League
212	Faridpur-2	Syeda Sajeda Chowdhury	Awami League
213	Faridpur-3	Khandaker Mosharraf Hossain	Awami League
214	Faridpur-4	Mujibur Rahman Chowdhury Nixon	Independent
215	Gopalganj-1	Faruk Khan	Awami League
216	Gopalganj-2	Sheikh Selim	Awami League
217	Gopalganj-3	Sheikh Hasina	Awami League
218	Madaripur-1	Noor-E-Alam Chowdhury Liton	Awami League
219	Madaripur-2	Shajahan Khan	Awami League
220	Madaripur-3	AFM Bahauddin Nasim	Awami League
221	Shariatpur-1	B. M. Muzammel Haque	Awami League
222	Shariatpur-2	Shawkat Ali	Awami League
223	Shariatpur-3	Nahim Razzaq	Awami League
224	Sunamganj-1	Moazzem Hossain Ratan	Awami League
225	Sunamganj-2	Suranjit Sengupta Died: 5 February 2017	Awami League
225	Sunamganj-2	Joya Sengupta By-election: 30 March 2017	Awami League
226	Sunamganj-3	M. A. Mannan	Awami League
227	Sunamganj-4	Pir Fazlur Rahman	Jatiya Party (Ershad)
228	Sunamganj-5	Mohibur Rahman Manik	Awami League
229	Sylhet-1	Abul Maal Abdul Muhith	Awami League
230	Sylhet-2	Yahya Chowdhury	Jatiya Party (Ershad)
231	Sylhet-3	Mahmud Us Samad Chowdhury	Awami League
232	Sylhet-4	Imran Ahmad	Awami League
233	Sylhet-5	Salim Uddin	Jatiya Party (Ershad)
234	Sylhet-6	Nurul Islam Nahid	Awami League
235	Moulvibazar-1	Md. Shahab Uddin	Awami League
236	Moulvibazar-2	Abdul Matin	Independent
237	Moulvibazar-3	Syed Mohsin Ali Died: 14 September 2015	Awami League
237	Moulvibazar-3	Syeda Saira Mohsin By-election: 23 November 2015	Awami League
238	Moulvibazar-4	Mohammed Abdus Shahid	Awami League
239	Habiganj-1	Abdul Munim Chowdhury	Jatiya Party (Ershad)
240	Habiganj-2	Md. Abdul Majid Khan	Awami League
241	Habiganj-3	Md. Abu Zahir	Awami League
242	Habiganj-4	Md. Mahbub Ali	Awami League
243	Brahmanbaria-1	Mohammad Sayedul Haque Died: 16 December 2017	Awami League
243	Brahmanbaria-1	Bodruddoza Md. Farhad Hossain By-election: 13 March 2018	Awami League
244	Brahmanbaria-2	Md. Ziaul Haque Mridha	Jatiya Party (Ershad)
245	Brahmanbaria-3	Obaidul Muktadir Chowdhury	Awami League
246	Brahmanbaria-4	Anisul Huq	Awami League
247	Brahmanbaria-5	Fayzur Rahman	Awami League
248	Brahmanbaria-6	A. B. Tajul Islam	Awami League
249	Comilla-1	Mohammad Shubid Ali Bhuiyan	Awami League
250	Comilla-2	Mohammed Amir Hossain	Awami League
251	Comilla-3	Yussuf Abdullah Harun	Independent
252	Comilla-4	Razee Mohammad Fakhrul	Independent
253	Comilla-5	Abdul Matin Khasru	Awami League
254	Comilla-6	A. K. M. Bahauddin Bahar	Awami League
255	Comilla-7	Ali Ashraf	Awami League
256	Comilla-8	Nurul Islam Milon	Jatiya Party (Ershad)
257	Comilla-9	Mohammad Tazul Islam	Awami League
258	Comilla-10	A. H. M. Mustafa Kamal	Awami League
259	Comilla-11	Mujibul Haque Mujib	Awami League
260	Chandpur-1	Muhiuddin Khan Alamgir	Awami League
261	Chandpur-2	Mofazzal Hossain Chowdhury	Awami League
262	Chandpur-3	Dipu Moni	Awami League
263	Chandpur-4	Mohammed Shamsul Hoque Bhuiyan	Awami League
264	Chandpur-5	Rafiqul Islam	Awami League
265	Feni-1	Shirin Akhter	Jatiya Samajtantrik Dal
266	Feni-2	Nizam Uddin Hazari	Awami League
267	Feni-3	Rahim Ullah	Independent
268	Noakhali-1	H. M. Ibrahim	Awami League
269	Noakhali-2	Morshed Alam	Awami League
270	Noakhali-3	Mamunur Rashid Kiron	Awami League
271	Noakhali-4	Ekramul Karim Chowdhury	Awami League
272	Noakhali-5	Obaidul Quader	Awami League
273	Noakhali-6	Ayesha Ferdaus	Awami League
274	Lakshmipur-1	M. A. Awal	Bangladesh Tarikat Federation
275	Lakshmipur-2	Mohammad Noman	Jatiya Party (Ershad)
276	Lakshmipur-3	A. K. M. Shahjahan Kamal	Awami League
277	Lakshmipur-4	Mohammad Abdullah	Awami League
278	Chittagong-1	Engineer Mosharraf Hossain	Awami League
279	Chittagong-2	Syed Najibul Bashar Maizbhandari	Bangladesh Tarikat Federation
280	Chittagong-3	Mahfuzur Rahaman	Awami League
281	Chittagong-4	Didarul Alam	Awami League
282	Chittagong-5	Anisul Islam Mahmud	Jatiya Party (Ershad)
283	Chittagong-6	A. B. M. Fazle Karim Chowdhury	Awami League
284	Chittagong-7	Hasan Mahmud	Awami League
285	Chittagong-8	Mayeen Uddin Khan Badal	Jatiya Samajtantrik Dal
286	Chittagong-9	Ziauddin Ahmed Bablu	Jatiya Party (Ershad)
287	Chittagong-10	Muhammad Afsarul Ameen	Awami League
288	Chittagong-11	M. Abdul Latif	Awami League
289	Chittagong-12	Shamsul Haque Chowdhury	Awami League
290	Chittagong-13	Saifuzzaman Chowdhury	Awami League
291	Chittagong-14	Md. Nazrul Islam Chowdhury	Awami League
292	Chittagong-15	Abu Reza Muhammad Nezamuddin Nadwi	Awami League
293	Chittagong-16	Mustafizur Rahaman Chowdhury	Awami League
294	Cox's Bazar-1	Mohammed Ellias	Jatiya Party (Ershad)
295	Cox's Bazar-2	Asheq Ullah Rafiq	Awami League
296	Cox's Bazar-3	Shaimum Sarwar Kamal	Awami League
297	Cox's Bazar-4	Abdur Rahman Bodi	Awami League
298	Khagrachhari	Kujendra Lal Tripura	Awami League
299	Rangamati	Ushatan Talukder	Independent
300	Bandarban	Bir Bahadur Ushwe Sing	Awami League

=== Members of Reserved Women's Seat ===
Women's Seat		Name	Party
301	Women's Seat-1	Selina Jahan Lita	Awami League
302	Women's Seat-2	Safura Begum	Awami League
303	Women's Seat-3	Hosne Ara Lutfa Dalia	Awami League
304	Women's Seat-4	Umme Kulsum Smrity	Awami League
305	Women's Seat-5	Begum Akhtar Jahan	Awami League
306	Women's Seat-6	Salina Begum	Awami League
307	Women's Seat-7	Selina Akhter Banu	Awami League
308	Women's Seat-8	Laila Arjuman Banu	Awami League
309	Women's Seat-9	Mst. Shirin Neyeem	Awami League
310	Women's Seat-10	Kamrul Laila Jolly	Awami League
311	Women's Seat-11	Happy Baral	Awami League
312	Women's Seat-12	Refat Amin	Awami League
313	Women's Seat-13	Nasima Ferdushe	Awami League
314	Women's Seat-14	Lutfun Nesa	Awami League
315	Women's Seat-15	Momotaj Begum	Awami League
316	Women's Seat-16	Tarana Halim	Awami League
317	Women's Seat-17	Monowara Begum	Awami League
318	Women's Seat-18	Mahjabeen Khaled	Awami League
319	Women's Seat-19	Fatema Zohora Rani	Awami League
320	Women's Seat-20	Dilara Begum	Awami League
321	Women's Seat-21	Fatema Tuzzahura	Awami League
322	Women's Seat-22	Fazilatun Nessa Indira	Awami League
323	Women's Seat-23	Pinu Khan	Awami League
324	Women's Seat-24	Sanjida Khanam	Awami League
325	Women's Seat-25	Nilufer Zafarullah	Awami League
326	Women's Seat-26	Roksana Yasmin Suty	Awami League
327	Women's Seat-27	Navana Akter	Awami League
328	Women's Seat-28	Amatul Kibria Keya Chowdhury	Awami League
329	Women's Seat-29	Shamsun Nahar Begum	Awami League
330	Women's Seat-30	Fazilatunnesa Bappy	Awami League
331	Women's Seat-31	Waseqa Ayesha Khan	Awami League
332	Women's Seat-32	Jahan Ara Begum Surma	Awami League
333	Women's Seat-33	Firoja Begum Chino	Awami League
334	Women's Seat-34	Amina Ahmed	Awami League
335	Women's Seat-35	Sabina Akter Tuhin	Awami League
336	Women's Seat-36	Rahima Akhter	Awami League
337	Women's Seat-37	Hosne Ara Begum	Awami League
338	Women's Seat-38	Kamrun Nahar Chowdhury	Awami League
339	Women's Seat-39	Hazera Khatun	Workers Party of Bangladesh
340	Women's Seat-40	Lutfa Taher	Jatiya Samajtantrik Dal
341	Women's Seat-41	Quazi Rosy	Independent
342	Women's Seat-42	Nurjahan Begum Mukta	Independent
343	Women's Seat-43	Ummey Razia Kajol	Independent
344	Women's Seat-44	Noor-E-Hasna Lily Chowdhury	Jatiya Party (Ershad)
345	Women's Seat-45	Mahjabeen Morshed	Jatiya Party (Ershad)
346	Women's Seat-46	Merina Rahman	Jatiya Party (Ershad)
347	Women's Seat-47	Rowshan Ara Mannan	Jatiya Party (Ershad)
348	Women's Seat-48	Shahanara Begum	Jatiya Party (Ershad)
349	Women's Seat-49	Sabiha Nahar Begum	Awami League
350	Women's Seat-50	Khorshed Ara Haque	Jatiya Party (Ershad)
