= Nazrul Islam (Sherpur politician) =

Bangladeshi politician

Member of Bangladesh Parliament
- In office February 1996 – June 2001
- Preceded by: Shah Rafiqul Bari Chowdhury
- Succeeded by: Atiur Rahman Atik

Personal details
- Party: Bangladesh Nationalist Party

Nazrul Islam is a Bangladesh Nationalist Party politician and a former member of parliament for Sherpur-1.

== Career ==
Islam was elected to parliament from Sherpur-1 as a Bangladesh Nationalist Party candidate in February 1996.
