= Farida Yasmin =

Farida Yasmin may refer to:

- Farida Yasmin (journalist), Bangladeshi journalist
- Farida Yasmin (singer), Bangladesh singer
- Farida Yasmin (politician), Bangladeshi politician
