= Ward No. 2 (Dhaka North City Corporation) =

- Dhaka North City Corporation
- Location in Dhaka city
- Coordinates: 23°48.5′N 90°21.7′E
- Country: Bangladesh
- Division: Dhaka Division
- City: Dhaka
- Parliamentary constituency: Dhaka-16
- Zone: 1
- Time zone: UTC+6 (Bangladesh Standard Time)
- Telephone code: +880 2

Ward No. 2 Dhaka North City Corporation (Bengali: ওয়ার্ড নং ২, ঢাকা উত্তর সিটি কর্পোরেশন) is an administrative division of Dhaka North City Corporation in zone 1. It's located in Pallabi police station of Dhaka City. It forms a city corporation council electoral constituency and is a part of Bangladesh Jatiyo Sangshad constituency Dhaka-16.

== Geography ==
The ward covers Mirpur-12.

== Election highlights ==
Zone	Old ward	Election	Councillor	Political party	Ref.
	02				
01		2015	Sajjad Hossain	Bangladesh Nationalist Party	
