= Fakhruddin Ahmed (disambiguation) =

Fakhruddin Ahmed is a name of Arabic-origin. It may refer to the following people:

- Fakhruddin Ahmed (born 1940), Bangladeshi economist and civil servant
- Fakhruddin Ahmed (secretary) (1931–2001), Bangladeshi diplomat
- Fakhruddin Ahmed (politician) (1905–1992), Bangladeshi lawyer and politician
- Fakhar Uddin Ahmed, Bangladeshi politician
- Fakhruddin Ali Ahmed (1905–1977), Indian lawyer and politician who served as President of India
- Fakhruddin Ahmadi Danesh-Ashtiani (born 1955), Iranian politician and scholar

== See also ==
- Fakhr al-Din
- Ahmad
