= M. A. Hamid =

Bangladeshi politician

Member of the Bangladesh Parliament for Mymensingh-11
- In office 15 April 1988 – 6 December 1990
- Preceded by: Aman Ullah Chowdhury
- Succeeded by: Aman Ullah Chowdhury

Personal details
- Party: Jatiya Party (Ershad)

Military service
- Branch/service: Bangladesh Army
- Rank: Major

M. A. Hamid is a Jatiya Party (Ershad) politician in Bangladesh and a former Jatiya Sangsad member for the Mymensingh-11 constituency.
