= Ummi (disambiguation) =

Ummi is one of the names and titles of Muhammad.

Ummi may also refer to:

== People ==
- Ummi Farzana Sattar (born 1984), Bangladeshi politician
- Ummi Ibrahim (born 1983), Nigerian actress
- Ummi Isa (fl. 14th century), Azerbaijani Turkish poet
- Ummi Kalthom bint Muhammad (c. 603–630), daughter of Muhammad
- Ummi Nazeera (born 1990), Malaysian actress

== Other uses ==
- Ummi (magazine), Indonesian magazine published from 1989 to 2018
