= Shahjahan Chowdhury (disambiguation) =

Shahjahan Chowdhury may refer to:

- Shahjahan Chowdhury, Bangladeshi politician from Cox's Bazar
- Shajahan Chowdhury (Chittagong politician), Bangladeshi politician from Chittagong
- Shahjahan Chowdhury (film director), Bangladeshi filmmaker
- Dewan Shahjahan Eaar Chowdhury, Bangladeshi politician from Mymensingh
