= Mashum Mostafa =

Bangladeshi politician

- মাছুম মোস্তফা

Member of Parliament
- Incumbent
- Assumed office 17 February 2026
- Preceded by: Ahmad Hossain
- Constituency: Netrokona-5

Personal details
- Born: 1 January 1980 (age 46) Purbadhala Upazila, Netrokona District
- Party: Bangladesh Jamaat-e-Islami

Mashum Mostafa is a Bangladeshi politician of the Bangladesh Jamaat-e-Islami. He is currently serving as a member of parliament from Netrokona-5 .

== Early life ==
Mostafa was born on 1 January 1980 at Purbadhala Upazila under Netrokona District.
