= National Bangla High School =

National Bangla High School ন্যাশনাল বাংলা হাই স্কুল

Location
- Mirpur-2, Dhaka; Bangladesh
- Coordinates: 23.8053°N 90.3626°E

Information
- Type: High School
- Established: 1966
- Website: nationalbanglahighschool.edu.bd

National Bangla High School (Bengali: বাংলায়ঃ ন্যাশনাল বাংলা হাই স্কুল) is a secondary school located in Mirpur-2, Dhaka, Bangladesh. Founded in 1966, the school was originally an Urdu medium one.

== Alumni ==
- Aslamul Haque was the member of parliament for Dhaka-14 from 2009 to 2021.
- Elias Uddin Mollah was elected to parliament for Dhaka-16 in 2008.

== See also ==
- Education in Bangladesh
