= Md Abdul Baten (politician) =

Bangladeshi politician

Abdul Baten
- আব্দুল বাতেন
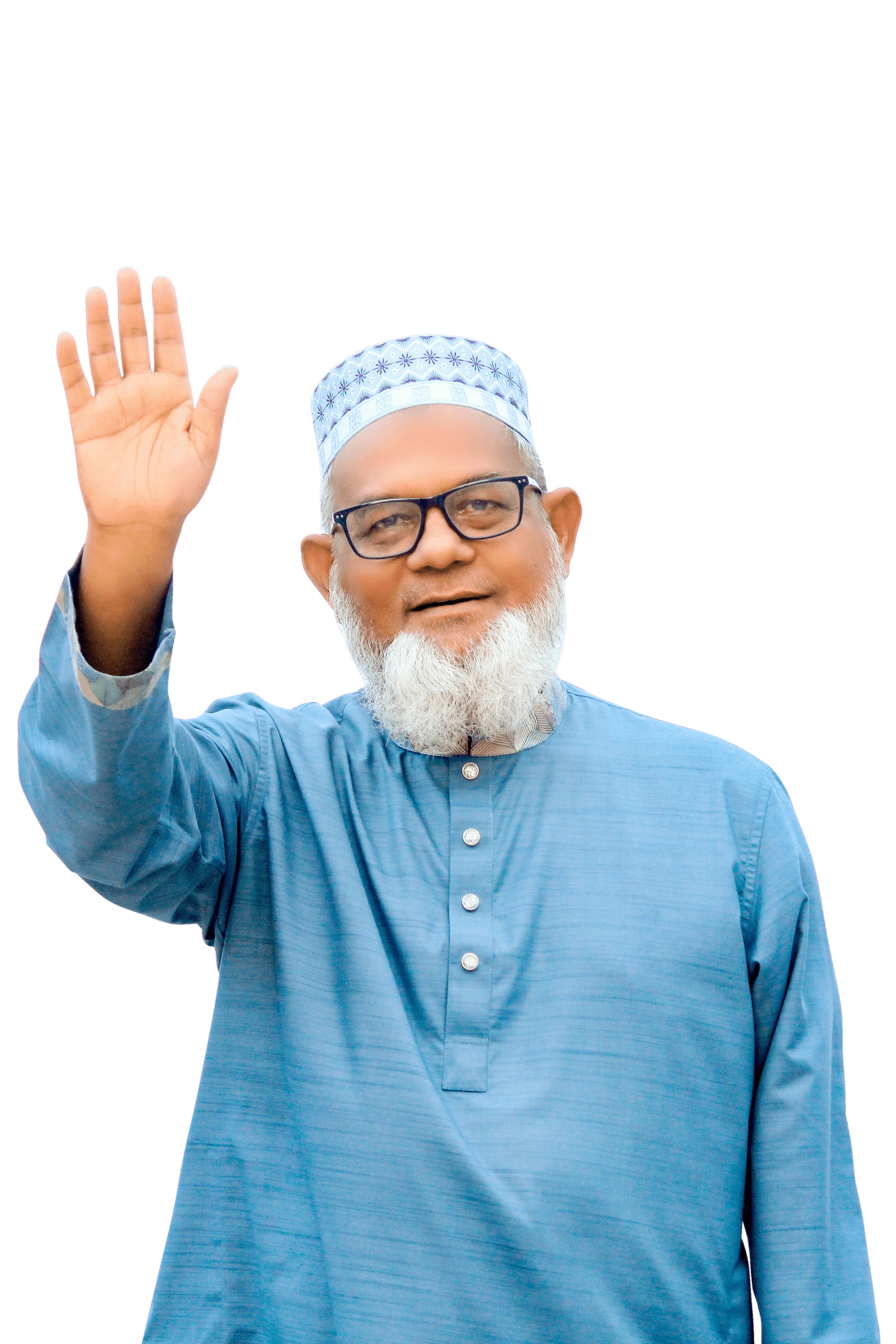
- Baten in 2026

Member of Parliament
- Incumbent
- Assumed office 16 February 2026
- Preceded by: Elias Mollah
- Constituency: Dhaka-16

Personal details
- Born: January 17, 1953 (age 73) Mirpur, Dacca, East Bengal
- Party: Bangladesh Jamaat-e-Islami
- Profession: Educator, retired army officer

Military service
- Allegiance: Bangladesh
- Branch/service: Bangladesh Army
- Years of service: 1977–2008
- Rank: Colonel
- Commands: Bangladesh Military Academy

Colonel Abdul Baten (Retd.) (Bengali: কর্নেল আব্দুল বাতেন) is a Bangladeshi politician and retired military officer who was elected as the member of parliament for the Dhaka-16 constituency in the 2026 national election. He contested the seat as a candidate of Bangladesh Jamaat-e-Islami.

== Political career ==
In the 13th National Parliamentary Election held on 12 February 2026, Abdul Baten stood for the Dhaka-16 constituency (covering the Pallabi–Rupnagar area) as a candidate of Bangladesh Jamaat-e-Islami.

According to election reports, he was leading in the informal count before the final results were declared. Baten's victory marked a notable result for his party in the capital region.

=== Campaign and public statements ===
During the 2026 campaign period, Baten was reported campaigning in areas of his constituency. His election platform included addressing local civic concerns and public services, according to news coverage of the election campaign.

=== Election constituency ===
Dhaka-16 is a constituency represented in the Jatiya Sangsad (National Parliament) of Bangladesh. It includes areas such as Pallabi and Rupnagar in Dhaka. The constituency's election result in 2026 was widely reported, including Baten's victory as a candidate from Bangladesh Jamaat-e-Islami.

== Publications ==
Abdul Baten has translated several Islamic historical works into Bengali, including:

- The Sword of Allah
- Muslim Conquest of Persia
- Muslim Conquest of Spain
