= Kazim Uddin Ahmed =

Bangladeshi politician

- কাজিম উদ্দিন আহম্মেদ

Member of Bangladesh Parliament
- In office 29 January 2019 – 29 January 2024
- Preceded by: Mohammed Amanullah
- Succeeded by: M. A. Waheed
- Constituency: Mymensingh-11

Personal details
- Born: 23 March 1966 (age 59) Bhaluka, Mymensingh District
- Party: Awami League
- Education: M.S.S, L.LB

Kazim Uddin Ahmed, also known as Dhanu (Bengali: ধনু, romanized: Dhonu), is a Bangladesh Awami League politician and a former member of parliament of Mymensingh-11.

== Birth and education ==
Kazim Uddin Ahmed was born in Mymensingh District Bhaluka Upazila Mallikbari Union.

== Career ==
From 2009 to 2014, Ahmed served as the chairman of Bhaluka Upazila. Ahmed was elected to parliament from Mymensingh-11 as a Bangladesh Awami League candidate 30 December 2018.

In May 2025, Ahmed was arrested from Aftabnagar, Dhaka, over the death of a protestor against Prime Minister Sheikh Hasina.
