= Fakhar Uddin Ahmed =

Bangladeshi politician

- ফখর উদ্দীন আহমেদ

Member of the Bangladesh Parliament for Mymensingh-11
- Incumbent
- Assumed office 17 February 2026
- Preceded by: Mohammad Abdul Waheed

Personal details
- Born: April 11, 1970 (age 56)q Bhaluka Upazila, Mymensingh District
- Party: Bangladesh Nationalist Party

Fakhar Uddin Ahmed is a Bangladeshi politician of the Bangladesh Nationalist Party. He is currently serving as a member of parliament from Mymensingh-11.

== Early life ==
Ahmed was born on 11 April 1970 in Bhaluka Upazila in Mymensingh District.
