= Mst Sabira Sultana =

Bangladeshi politician

- মোছাঃ সাবিরা সুলতানা

Member of the Bangladesh Parliament for Women's Reserved Seat–14
- Incumbent
- Assumed office 3 May 2026
- Preceded by: Farjana Sumi

Personal details
- Party: Bangladesh Nationalist Party

Mst Sabira Sultana is a Bangladeshi politician. She is the incumbent Jatiya Sangsad member from the Women's Reserved Seat–14 since May 2026.

== Background ==
In July 2010, Anti-Corruption Commission filed a case against Sultana accusing her of amassing illegal wealth. She was sentenced to six years in prison and fined Tk 5,000 in July 2018. She was then barred competing at the 2018 Bangladeshi general election as her conviction and jail sentence remained in force.

Sultana competed at the 2026 Bangladeshi general election to represent the Jessore-2 constituency. She lost the race securing 146,447 votes to Bangladesh Jamaat-e-Islami candidate Md. Moslehuddin Farid who had received 180,965 votes.
