= Nazma Akhter =

Bangladeshi politician

- নাজমা আখতার

Member of the Bangladesh Parliament for Reserved Women's Seat-37
- In office 28 February 2024 – 6 August 2024
- Preceded by: Salma Chowdhury

Member of the Bangladesh Parliament for Reserved Women's Seat-13
- In office 19 March 2009 – 24 January 2014
- Preceded by: Tasmin Rana
- Succeeded by: Nasima Ferdushe

Personal details
- Born: 1 September 1967 (age 58)
- Party: Bangladesh Awami League

Nazma Akhter (born 1 September 1967) is a Bangladesh Awami League politician and a former member of Jatiya Sangsad from the reserved seat-13.

== Career ==
Akhter was elected to parliament from a reserved seat as a Bangladesh Awami League candidate in 2009. She is the founder president of Bangladesh Awami Jubo Mohila League.
