= Nurunnahar Begum =

Bangladeshi politician

- নূরুন নাহার বেগম

Member of the Bangladesh Parliament for Reserved women's seat-50
- In office 28 February 2024 – 6 August 2024
- Preceded by: Selina Islam

Personal details
- Born: 24 August 1962 (age 63)
- Party: Jatiya Party

Nurunnahar Begum (born 24 August 1962) is a Jatiya Party politician and a former Jatiya Sangsad member from a women's reserved for Jhenaidah District. She is the head of the Thakurgaon District unit of the party.
