= Rashedul Islam (politician) =

Bangladeshi politician

Md. Rashedul Islam Rashed
- মোঃ রাশেদুল ইসলাম রাশেদ

Member of the Bangladesh Parliament for Sherpur-1
- Incumbent
- Assumed office 17 February 2026
- Preceded by: Chanuar Hossain Chanu

Personal details
- Born: 1990 (age 35–36) Kumri Mudipara, Sherpur District, Bangladesh
- Party: Bangladesh Jamaat-e-Islami
- Spouse: Ruqayyah Beenthe Selim
- Education: Manarat International University
- Occupation: Businessperson, writer, politician
- Website: rashedulislam.net

Md. Rashedul Islam Rashed (known as Hafez Rashedul Islam; born 1990) is Bangladeshi politician, businessperson, writer and member of the parliament from Sherpur-1 constituency in Bangladesh government. He is former central president of Bangladesh Islami Chhatrashibir. Currently he is the Central Mojlish-e-Shura Member of Bangladesh Jamaat-e-Islami.

== Early life and family ==
Hafez Rashedul Islam was born in 1990 in Kumri Mudipara village under Bajitkhila Union of Sherpur Sadar Upazila in Sherpur District, Bangladesh. His father is Md. Abul Kashem and mother is Raziya Begum. He is the youngest among five siblings. He married Rukaiya Binte Selim in 2023, and the couple has one daughter.

== Education ==
Hafez Rashedul Islam completed his primary education at Kumri Kalitala Government Primary School. He later studied at Kumri Bajitkhila Islamia Dakhil Madrasah and completed his Qur’an memorization (Hifz) from Ghonapara Hafezia Madrasa and Farukia Darussalam Madrasa Sherpur.

He passed Dakhil (SSC Equivalent) from Al-Jamiatul Islamia Fazil Madrasa and Alim (HSC Equivalent) from Tamirul Millat Kamil Madrasah. He obtained his Bachelor of Science (Honours) and Master of Science degrees in population science and human resource development from the University of Rajshahi.

He also earned a professional diploma in information technology from the Bangladesh Technical Education Board and completed a Master of Business Administration (MBA) from Manarat International University.

== Political career ==
Hafez Rashedul Islam joined Bangladesh Islami Chhatrashibir in 2003 while studying in secondary level. He progressed through the organization, becoming an associate (Sathi) in 2004 and a full member in 2009 during his studies at the University of Rajshahi branch.

He held several leadership positions within the organization, including member of the Central Executive Council, president of the University of Rajshahi Branch, central science secretary, central education secretary, central dawah secretary, central office secretary, and secretary general. In 2022, he served as the central president of Bangladesh Islami Chhatrashibir.

In 2023, he joined Bangladesh Jamaat-e-Islami. He currently serves as a member of the Dhaka Metropolitan South Working Committee and a member of the party’s Central Mojlish-e-Shura.

== Electoral history ==
Hafez Rashedul Islam Rashed first-time contested the 2026 Bangladeshi general election from the Sherpur-1 constituency as a candidate of Bangladesh Jamaat-e-Islami and was elected to the Jatiya Sangsad with 130,989 votes. His nearest rival was Bangladesh Nationalist Party (BNP) candidate Sansila Jebrin Priyanka, who received 77,521 votes. Following the announcement of the results, Priyanka challenged the outcome and sought a re-election through applications filed with the Election Commission and the High Court.

Electoral history of Hafez Rashedul Islam
Year	Election	Constituency	Party	Votes	Vote (%)	Result
2026	2026 Bangladeshi general election	Sherpur-1	Bangladesh Jamaat-e-Islami	130,989	62.8%	Won

== Professional career ==
Hafez Rashedul Islam began his professional career as an executive director of Planter Skill Development Limited (PSDL) in Dhaka. He later became an entrepreneur and established multiple ventures.

He is involved in managing a publishing house, Hajj and Umrah agency, online news portal, Hospital, Agro farm, medical consultancy agency, and educational institutions.

== Political persecution ==
During his political career, Hafez Rashedul Islam has faced multiple illegal cases and arrests. Over a period of approximately 15 years, 63 cases were filed against him. He was arrested multiple times and reportedly subjected to detention, remand, and imprisonment.

He has been involved in various political movements, including campaigns related to madrasah education reform, student rights, campus environment, electoral reforms, and quota reform movements.

== Role in the 2024 July Uprising ==
During the July 2024 mass uprising in Bangladesh, Hafez Rashedul Islam played a role as a political organizer in Dhaka. He participated in protests and coordinated activities among activists.

He was arrested on 20 July by the Counter Terrorism and Transnational Crime (CTTC) unit and reportedly held in custody for several days before being placed on remand. Following the political developments in early August 2024, he was released from detention.

After the uprising, he has been involved in support activities for affected individuals and families.

== Social and charitable activities ==
In addition to his political activities, Hafez Rashedul Islam is engaged in social welfare and community development. He is associated with organizations such as Sherpur Forum and Sherpur Advancement Forum of Equity, working on education, employment, and humanitarian assistance.

His initiatives include distribution of relief materials, educational scholarships, tree plantation programs, and support for infrastructure development such as roads, tubewells, and religious institutions. He has also been involved in organizing free medical camps and youth development programs.

He holds or has held positions in several organizations, including educational institutions, charitable foundations, alumni associations, and social organizations.

== Writing ==
Rashedul Islam writes on Islamic thought, personal development, leadership, human resource development, education, family, social reform, and contemporary political affairs. His essays and opinion pieces have been published on his personal website and other online platforms.

=== Books ===
- The Prophetic Art of Building People (Bengali: Manush Gorar Nobobi Shilpo: Rasul (SAW)-er Proshikkhon Paddhoti, 2022) — A Bengali-language booklet published by Prochchhod Prokashon. The book discusses the Prophet Muhammad's methods of character building, leadership development, and human development from an Islamic perspective.

=== Online publications ===
Islam regularly publishes articles on his personal website covering Islamic studies, leadership, governance, politics, economics, education, parenting, and current national and international affairs.
