= Waseqa Ayesha Khan =

Bangladeshi politician (born 1969)

- ওয়াসিকা আয়শা খান
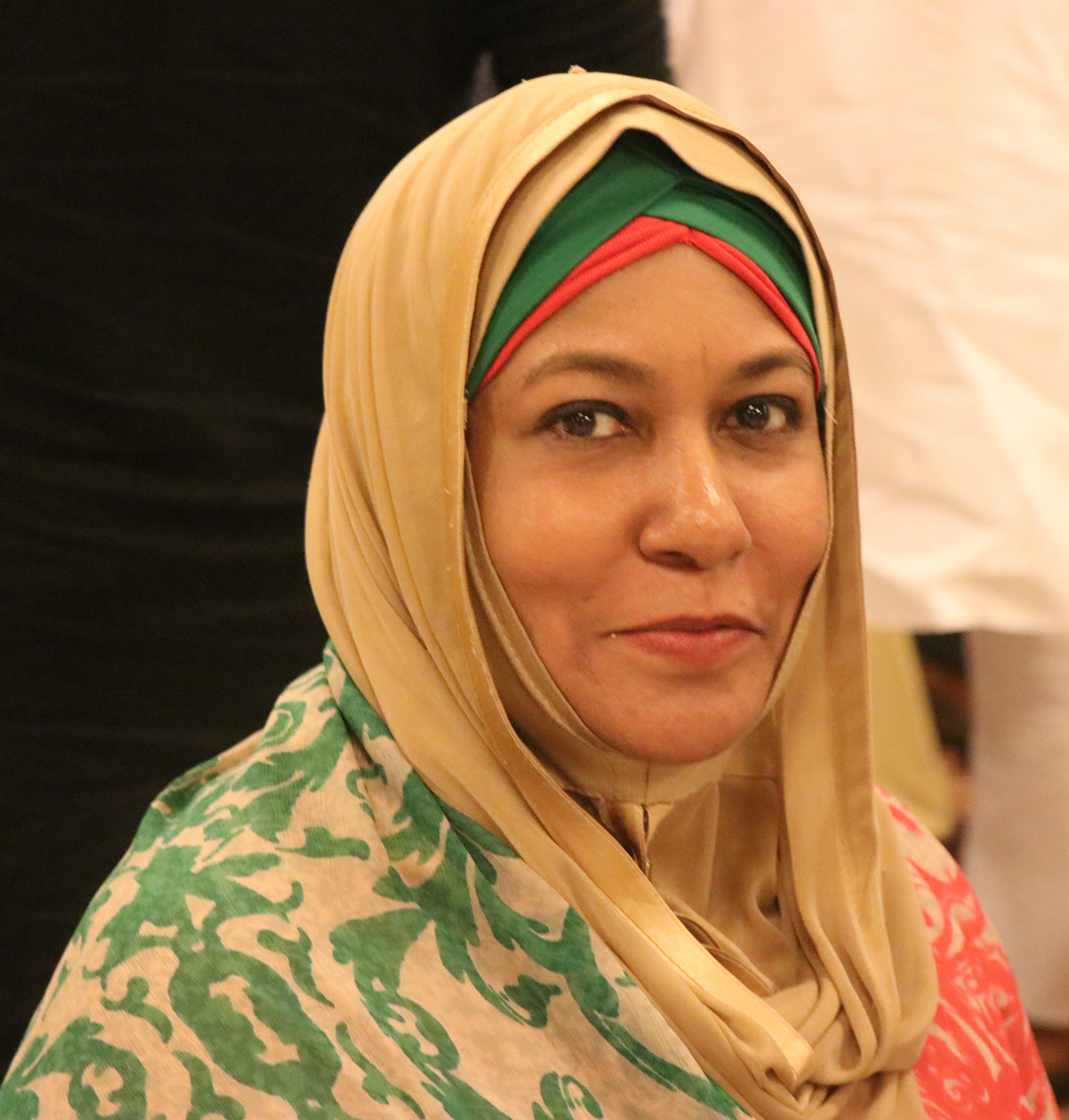
- Khan in 2018

State Minister of Finance
- In office 1 March 2024 – 6 August 2024
- Prime Minister: Sheikh Hasina
- Minister: Abul Hasan Mahmud Ali
- Preceded by: Muhammad Abdul Mannan

Member of the Bangladesh Parliament for Reserved women's seat–47
- In office 28 February 2024 – 6 August 2024
- Preceded by: Lutfun Nesa Khan

Member of the Bangladesh Parliament for Reserved women's seat–7
- In office 28 February 2024 – 29 January 2024
- Preceded by: Selina Akhter Banu
- Succeeded by: Farida Akter Banu

Personal details
- Born: 16 July 1969 (age 57)
- Party: Bangladesh Awami League
- Parent: Ataur Rahman Khan Kaiser (father)
- Education: University of Chittagong

Waseqa Ayesha Khan (born 16 July 1969) is a Bangladesh Awami League politician and a former Minister of State for Finance. She is a former member of parliament of Reserved women's seats.

== Early life ==
Khan was born on 16 July 1969. She did her bachelor's and master's in commerce from the University of Chittagong. Her father was Ataur Rahman Khan Kaiser.

== Career ==
Khan was elected to parliament from Reserved women's seat-31 (Chittagong) as an Awami League candidate on 30 December 2018. She has said that the construction of power plants in Bangladesh does not take into account social and environmental considerations.

In December 2019, Khan was made Finance and Planning Affairs secretary of Awami League. She is an advisor of Bistaar: Chittagong Arts Complex. She is the vice-chairperson of Climate Parliament Bangladesh which called for a future without the use of fossil fuel. She is the vice president of Mohila Awami League, the women's wing of Awami League.

Khan was made the chairman of Standing Committee on Power, Energy and Mineral Resources Ministry in June 2021. On 1 March 2024, she appointed as state minister for finance.
