= Abu Jafar Mohammad Moinuddin =

Bangladeshi politician

- আবু জাফর মোহাম্মদ মঈনউদ্দিন

Member of the Bangladesh Parliament for Comilla-22
- In office 7 March 1973 – 6 November 1976
- Preceded by: Position created
- Succeeded by: Mizanur Rahman Chowdhury

Personal details
- Party: Awami League

Abu Jafar Mohammad Moinuddin was an Awami League politician in Bangladesh and a former member of the Jatiya Sangsad representing the now-defunct Comilla-22 constituency. His daughter, Nurjahan Begum Mukta, was elected to parliament in 2014. His son, Md. Zobayedur Rahman, was an additional deputy inspector general (additional DIG) of Bangladesh Police who died on 6 November 2024.

== Career ==
Moinuddin was elected to parliament from Comilla-22 as an Awami League candidate in 1973.
