= Khorshed Ara Haque =

Bangladeshi politician (died 2022)

Member of Parliament
- In office 10 April 2014 – January 2019

Personal details
- Born: Cox's Bazar
- Died: 12 July 2022 Cox's Bazar
- Party: Jatiya Party

Khorshed Ara Haque (Bengali: খোরশেদ আরা হক) was a Bangladesh Jatiya Party politician and member of parliament. She was elected from a reserved seat for women.

== Biography ==
Haque was nominated to the Parliament of Bangladesh as part of the 50 reserved seats for women, as a candidate from the Bangladesh Jatiya Party. Her nomination and that of fellow nominee, Sabiha Nahar Begum of the Bangladesh Awami League, were cancelled by the Bangladesh Election Commission for unpaid telephone bills. She had 223,488 taka unpaid bills to the state owned Bangladesh Telecommunications Company Limited. She paid her dues to the telecom company and appealed the decision of the commission. The commission rejected her appeal on the grounds that the bills were not paid 12 days before her nomination was filed with the commission.

Haque was elected unopposed and declared winner on 10 April 2014 by the election commission. She is a notable women's rights activist in Bangladesh. She was the chief guest at the round table conference titled Planet 50:50 by 2030: Step it up for Gender Equality and against Gender Based Violence in Cox's Bazar on 25 March 2016. The conference was organized by The Daily Star and the United Nations Population Fund. In the conference she said she would discuss laws related to gender-based violence in the parliament and that Bangladesh could not become a developed country without equal rights for women. In parliament on 9 June 2017, she criticized Finance Minister Abul Maal Abdul Muhith for his plan to add a 15 percent VAT on all credit and debit accounts in Bangladesh. She was part of a government delegation that distributed relief materials to Rohingya Refugees in Cox's Bazar on 5 October 2017.
