= Mohammad Shahid Islam =

Bangladesh politician (born 1963)

- মোহাম্মদ শহিদ ইসলাম

Member of Parliament for Lakshmipur-2
- In office 30 December 2018 – 28 January 2021
- Preceded by: Mohammad Noman
- Succeeded by: Nuruddin Chowdhury Noyon

Personal details
- Born: 18 May 1963 (age 62) Raipur, East Pakistan, Pakistan
- Party: Independent, Awami League
- Spouse: Selina Islam
- Occupation: Businessman

Mohammad Shahid Islam (known as Kazi Papul; born 18 May 1963) is a controversial Bangladeshi businessman and a former Jatiya Sangsad member representing the Lakshmipur-2 constituency during 2018–2021 as an independent candidate.

Islam has been serving 7-year imprisonment in a Kuwaiti jail due to human trafficking, money laundering, and bribery cases against him, since January 2021.

== Background and education ==
Islam was born on 28 May 1963 in Raipur Upazila of Lakshmipur District to Mohammad Nurul Islam and Tuhrun Nesha.

== Political life ==
Islam defeated Abul Khair Bhuiyan of BNP as an independent politician candidate in the 11th Jatiya Sangsad elections in 2018.

=== Charges and convictions in Kuwait ===
On 6 June 2020, Islam was detained on allegations of human trafficking and money laundering from the Mishref residential area of Kuwait City by Kuwait's CID. Earlier on 27 February, the Anti-Corruption Commission of Bangladesh opened an inquiry against him for amassing Tk 1,400 crore by human trafficking to Kuwait and siphoning off the money to other countries. On 14 July, according to a Kuwait's Public Prosecution report, Papul confessed during interrogation that he had bribed 720,000 dinars (about Tk 20 crore) to two members of Kuwait's National Assembly to facilitate foreign workers' recruitment and financial transactions. He owned a construction company, Marafie Kuwaitia General Contracting Company, in Kuwait.

In November 2020, the Anti-Corruption Commission of Bangladesh (ACC) sued Papul for money laundering - he was accused of moving 148.41 crore Bangladeshi taka to different bank accounts of his sister-in-law, Jesmin Prodhan. ACC also sued Papul's wife, Selina, and their daughters, Wafa and Jesmin, in this case.

On 28 January 2021, Kuwait's Criminal Court sentenced him to four years in jail and fined him 1.9 million Kuwaiti dinars (around US$6.2 million) in human-trafficking and money-laundering cases. Subsequently, on 11 February, he lost his Jatiya Sangsad membership as per articles 66 and 67 of the constitution of Bangladesh. On 26 April, Kuwait's Appeal Court extended the imprisonment to seven years.

== Personal life ==
Islam is married to Selina Islam who is also an incumbent Jatiya Sangsad member representing the reserved women's seat-49. In February 2022, the details of the bank account of his wife, Islam, and his daughter was inquired by Anti-Corruption Commission (ACC).
