= Farida Yasmin (politician) =

Bangladeshi politician and social worker

- ফরিদা ইয়াসমিন

Member of the Bangladesh Parliament for Women's Reserved Seat-6
- Incumbent
- Assumed office 3 May 2026
- Preceded by: Mahafuza Sultana

Personal details
- Party: Bangladesh Nationalist Party
- Children: 2

Farida Yasmin is a Bangladesh Nationalist Party politician, social worker and former teacher. She is the incumbent Jatiya Sangsad member from a reserved women's seat–6 (Meherpur-Kushtia area) since May 2026.

== Background ==
Farida Yasmin was born to Nurul Islam and Fazila Khatun.

== Career ==
Yasmin served as a teacher at Sher-e-Bangla Girls' College.

In 1992, a BNP election office was established at Yasmin's residence in Dhaka. Since then, she became involved in politics with the party. In 1996, she was elected General Secretary of the Jatiyatabadi Mohila Dal of Ward No. 48 under Dhanmondi Thana. Later, when Dhanmondi Thana was divided in 1999, she served as convener of the Mohila Dal of Hazaribagh Thana.

In 2007, Yasmin was elected Joint Convener of the Kushtia District Convening Committee. From 2010 to 2017, she served as the undivided General Secretary of the Jatiyatabadi Mohila Dal in undivided Dhaka Metropolitan. In 2021, she was elected a member of the Kushtia District Committee.

== Personal life ==
Yasmin is married to K. M. Hamidur Rahman, a retired engineer. They have two sons, K. M. Erfan Hamid, and K. M. Bayezid Hamid.

Yasmin is a resident of Naodapara in Bheramara, Kushtia District.
