= Tarana Halim =

Bangladeshi politician

- তারানা হালিম
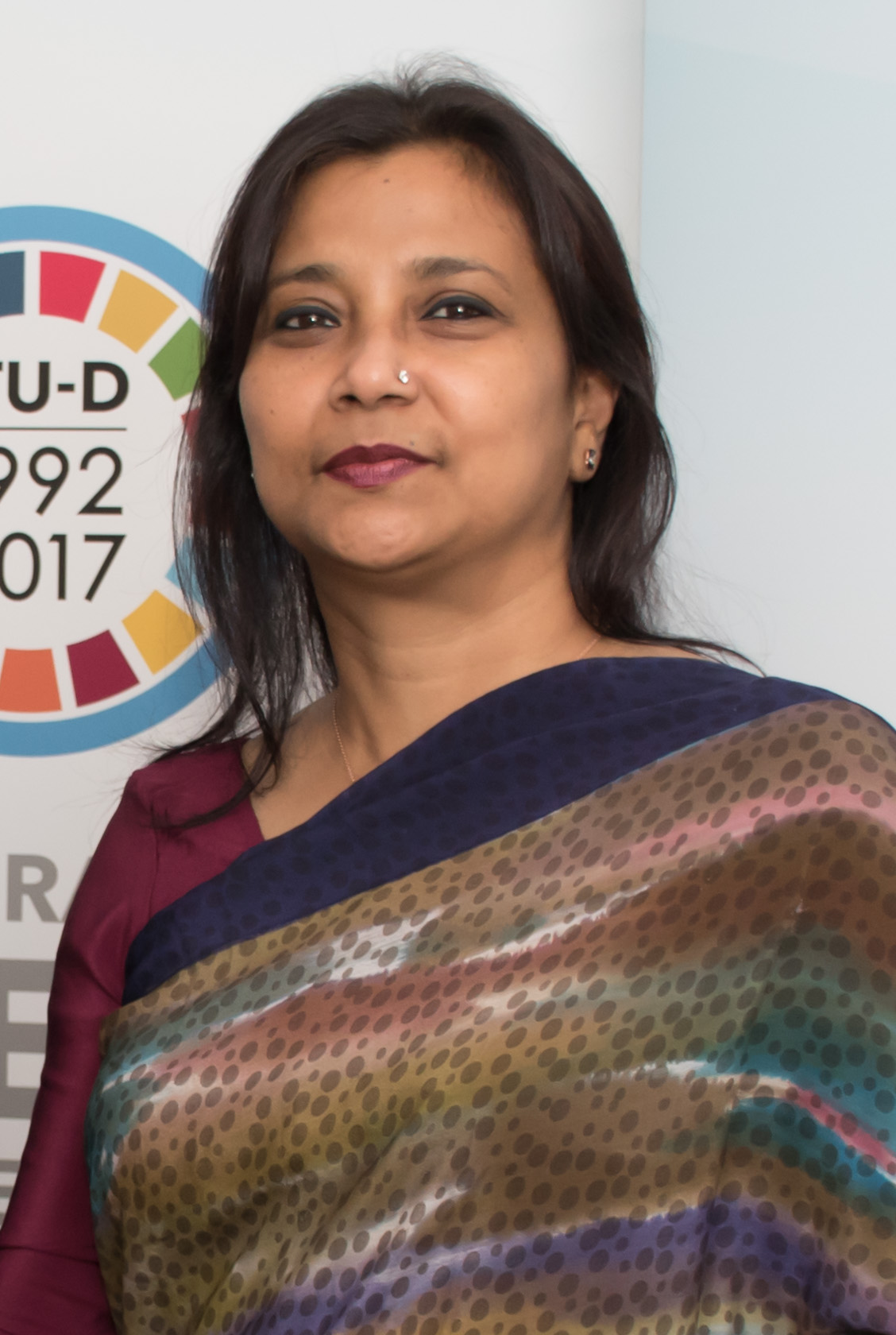
- Halim in 2017

Minister of State for Information
- In office 3 January 2018 – 7 January 2019
- Prime Minister: Sheikh Hasina
- Preceded by: Hasanul Haq Inu
- Succeeded by: Zunaid Ahmed Palak

Minister of State for Post and Telecommunications
- In office 14 July 2015 – 3 January 2018
- Prime Minister: Sheikh Hasina

Member of Bangladesh Parliament
- In office 28 February 2024 – 6 August 2024
- Preceded by: Nazma Akther
- Succeeded by: Fahmida Haque
- Constituency: Reserved women's seat–18
- In office 14 January 2014 – 29 January 2019
- Preceded by: Parvin Talukder Maya
- Succeeded by: Hosne Ara
- Constituency: Reserved women's seat–16
- In office 25 January 2009 – 24 January 2014
- Succeeded by: Laila Arjuman Banu
- Constituency: Reserved women's seat–8

Personal details
- Born: 16 August 1966 (age 59) Tangail, East Pakistan, Pakistan
- Party: Bangladesh Awami League
- Spouse: Ahmed Rubel
- Parent: M A Halim (father) Akhter Halim (mother)
- Education: LLM
- Alma mater: University of Dhaka

Tarana Halim (born 16 August 1966) is a Bangladeshi politician, former lawyer, television and film actress and playwright. In January 2018, she was appointed as the state minister of information. Earlier, she served as the state minister of the Post and Telecommunications Division under the Ministry of Posts, Telecommunications and Information Technology of the government of Bangladesh since July 2014.

== Career ==
She first came into limelight in 1976 by emerging as the champion in Notun Kuri, a popular children reality show of Bangladesh Television. Halim got her break-through in acting by working in the TV plays Sneho and Dhakaye Thaki.

Halim served as the general secretary of Bangabandhu Sangskritik Jote, a cultural organization.

On March 20, 2009, Halim was elected member of parliament of one of the 45 reserved women seats.

== Personal life ==
Halim was married twice. She has two sons from her first marriage. Afterwards she was married to actor Ahmed Rubel. They were also divorced. She has two sons (aged 27 and 36).

== Works ==
- Golapi Ekhon Traine (1978)
- Julekha's Ghar (1996)
- Abar Ekti Jhuddo Chai (1999)
- Jibon Jekhane Jemon
