= Mahmuda Habiba =

Bangladeshi politician

- মাহমুদা হাবিবা

Member of the Bangladesh Parliament for Women's Reserved Seat–13
- Incumbent
- Assumed office 3 May 2026
- Preceded by: Laila Parvin Sejuti

Personal details
- Party: Bangladesh Nationalist Party
- Parent: Muhammad Ayyan Ud-Din (father)

Mahmuda Habiba is a Bangladeshi politician. She is the incumbent Jatiya Sangsad member from the Women's Reserved Seat–13 since May 2026. She is the joint general secretary of the Krishak Dal central committee and a member of the Rajshahi district BNP convening committee.

== Background ==
Habiba's father, Muhammad Ayyan Ud-Din, was a Jatiya Sangsad member representing the Rajshahi-4 constituency during 1986–1988.
