= Bedowra Ahmed Salam =

Bangladeshi politician

- বেদৌরা আহমেদ সালাম

Member of the Bangladesh Parliament for Reserved women's seat-38
- In office 28 February 2024 – 6 August 2024
- Preceded by: Hosne Ara

Personal details
- Born: 17 April 1976 (age 49)
- Party: Bangladesh Awami League

Bedowra Ahmed Salam (born 17 April 1976) is a Bangladesh Awami League politician and a former Jatiya Sangsad member from a women's reserved for Gopalganj District.
