= Drowpodi Dabi Agarwala =

Bangladeshi politician

- দ্রোপদী দেবি আগরওয়াল

Member of the Bangladesh Parliament for Women's Reserved Seat-2
- In office 1 March 2024 – 6 August 2024
- Preceded by: Jinnatul Bakia

Personal details
- Born: 1 January 1954 (age 72) Thakurgaon, East Bengal, Dominion of Pakistan
- Party: Awami League
- Occupation: Politician and social worker

Drowpodi Dabi Agarwala is a Bangladesh Awami League politician and a former Jatiya Sangsad member from a women's reserved seat.
