= Pinu Khan =

Bangladeshi politician (1952–2024)

- পিনু খান

Member of the Bangladesh Parliament for Reserved Women's Seat–23
- In office 5 January 2014 – 7 January 2019
- Preceded by: Amena Ahmed

Member of the Bangladesh Parliament for Reserved Women's Seat–49
- In office 9 December 2011 – 25 January 2014
- Preceded by: Position created
- Succeeded by: Sabiha Nahar Begum

Personal details
- Born: 2 February 1954 Dhaka, East Bengal, Pakistan
- Died: 17 March 2024 (aged 70) Dhaka, Bangladesh
- Party: Bangladesh Awami League

Pinu Khan (2 February 1954 – 17 March 2024) was a Bangladesh Awami League politician and a former member of parliament from the reserved women's seats.

== Life and career ==
Pinu Khan was born on 2 February 1954. She was selected to parliament on 5 January 2014 from reserved women's seat-23 as a Bangladesh Awami League candidate. She served as the general secretary of the Mohila Awami League. Khan died on 17 March 2024, at the age of 70.

== Controversy ==
Khan's son, Bakhtiar Alam Rony, fired his licensed gun in a traffic jam in an incident in April 2015. His shooting killed Abdul Hakim, a rickshaw puller, and Yakub Ali, an auto-rickshaw driver. He was interrogated by the Detective Branch over the murders while Pinu denied any involvement of her son. He was charged with murder and the case became known as Eskaton Double Murder. On 30 January 2019, a Dhaka court sentenced him to life imprisonment.
