= Ummey Razia Kajol =

Bangladeshi politician

Member of Bangladesh Parliament
- In office 10 April 2014 – 30 December 2018

Personal details
- Party: Bangladesh Awami League

Ummey Razia Kajol (Bengali: উম্মে রাজিয়া কাজল) is a Bangladesh Awami League politician and a former member of the Bangladesh Parliament from a reserved seat.

== Early life ==
Kajol was born on 1 February 1966 and she has a law degree.

== Career ==
Kajol was elected to parliament from a reserved seat as a Bangladesh Awami League candidate in 2014.
