= Mst. Shirin Neyeem =

Bangladeshi politician

Member of Bangladesh Parliament
- In office 10 April 2014 – 30 December 2018

Personal details
- Party: Bangladesh Awami League

Mst. Shirin Neyeem (Bengali: শিরিন নাঈম) is a Bangladesh Awami League politician and a former member of the Bangladesh Parliament from a reserved seat.

== Early life ==
Nayeem was born on 24 April 1959 and she has no formal education.

== Career ==
Neyeem was elected to parliament from a reserved seat as a Bangladesh Awami League candidate in 2014.
