= Dilwara Yousuf =

Bangladeshi politician

- দিলোয়ারা ইউসুফ

Member of the Bangladesh Parliament for Reserved women's seat-46
- In office 28 February 2024 – 6 August 2024
- Preceded by: Mst. Khaleda Khanum

Personal details
- Born: 1 November 1962 (age 63)
- Party: Bangladesh Awami League

Dilwara Yousuf (born 1 November 1962) is a Awami League politician and a former Jatiya Sangsad member from a women's reserved for Chittagong District. She was a member of the Chattogram Zila Parishad.
