= Rowshan Ara Mannan =

Bangladesh politician

Member of Parliament Rowshan Ara Mannan

Member of Parliament for 11th Jatiya Sangsad members Reserved women seats-47
- Majority: Jatiya Party

Personal details
- Born: 3 January 1958 (age 68) Comilla, Bangladesh
- Citizenship: Bangladesh
- Party: Bangladesh Jatiya Party
- Occupation: Politics
- Profession: Teaching, business
- Known for: Women politicians

Rowshan Ara Mannan (Bengali: রওশন আরা মান্নান; born 3 January 1948) is a Bangladesh Jatiya Party politician in Bangladesh and reserved women seats of 47-Elected MP. Rowshan Ara Mannan for being elected as a lawmaker reserved for women in the 11 parliament.

== Early life ==
Rowshan Ara Mannan was born in a Muslim family of Kotoali, Comilla district. She has a M.A, B.Ed. degree.

== Politics career ==
Rowshan Ara Mannan was elected MP from reserved seats for Comilla District, in the nomination of Jatiya Party for the continuation of the Jatiya Sangsad elections.
