= Momotaj Begum =

Bangladeshi politician

Member of Bangladesh Parliament
- In office 10 April 2014 – 30 December 2018

Personal details
- Party: Bangladesh Awami League

Momotaj Begum (Bengali: মমতাজ বেগ) is a Bangladesh Awami League politician and a former member of the Bangladesh Parliament from a reserved seat.

== Early life ==
Begum was born on 1 January 1963. She graduated with a law degree and worked as an advocate.

== Career ==
She was the female vice chairman of Bhola Sadar Upazila Parishad in 2010.

Begum was elected to parliament from a reserved seat as a Bangladesh Awami League candidate in 2014. She was a member of the parliamentary standing committee on the Ministry of Shipping. She sought unsuccessfully to retain her seat in the 2018 Bangladeshi general election.

As of 2019, she was president of the Bhola District branch of the Bangladesh Mohila Awami League.
