= Kohale Quddus =

Bangladesh Awami League politician

Member of the Bangladesh Parliament for Reserved women's seat-8
- In office 28 February 2024 – 6 August 2024
- Preceded by: Suborna Mustafa

Personal details
- Born: 7 September 1974 (age 51)
- Party: Awami League

Kohale Quddus Mukti (born 7 September 1974) is a Bangladesh Awami League politician from Natore and a former Jatiya Sangsad member from a women's reserved seat in 2024.
