= Roksana Yasmin Suty =

Bangladeshi politician

Member of Bangladesh Parliament
- In office 10 April 2014 – 30 December 2018

Personal details
- Political party: Bangladesh Awami League

Roksana Yasmin Suty (Bengali: রোকসানা ইয়াসমিন ছুটি) is a Bangladesh Awami League politician and a former member of the Bangladesh Parliament from a reserved seat.

== Early life ==
Suty was born on 24 April 1959 and she has a B.A. degree.

== Career ==
Suty was elected to parliament from a reserved seat as a Bangladesh Awami League candidate in 2014. She was member of the Parliamentarians Caucus on Migration and Development.
