= Fatema Zohora Rani =

Bangladeshi politician

Member of Bangladesh Parliament
- In office 10 April 2014 – 30 December 2018

Personal details
- Political party: Bangladesh Awami League

Fatema Zohora Rani (Bengali: ফাতেমা জোহরা রাণী) is a Bangladesh Awami League politician and a former member of the Bangladesh Parliament from a reserved seat.

== Early life ==
Rani was born on 11 July 1957 and she has studied up to S.S.C. degree.

== Career ==
Rani was elected to parliament from a reserved seat as a Bangladesh Awami League candidate in 2014.
