= Farjana Sumi =

Bangladeshi politician

- ফারজানা সুমি

Member of the Bangladesh Parliament for Reserved Women's Seat-14
- In office 28 February 2024 – 6 August 2024
- Succeeded by: Mst Sabira Sultana

Personal details
- Born: 28 July 1986 (age 39) Barguna, Barisal, Bangladesh
- Party: Awami League
- Occupation: Politician

Mst Farjana Sumi (born 28 July 1986) is a Bangladesh Awami League politician and a former Jatiya Sangsad member from a women's reserved seat from Barguna.
