= Najneen Nahar Rashid =

Bangladeshi politician

- নাজনীন নাহার রশীদ

Member of the Bangladesh Parliament for Reserved women's seat-15
- In office 28 February 2024 – 6 August 2024

Personal details
- Born: 1 February 1968 (age 58)
- Party: Bangladesh Awami League

Najneen Nahar Rashid (born 1 February 1968) is a Bangladesh Awami League politician and a former Jatiya Sangsad member from a women's reserved seat-15.
