= Nadia Binte Amin =

Bangladeshi politician (born 1963)

- নাদিয়া বিনতে আমিন

Member of the Bangladesh Parliament for Reserved women's seat-22
- In office 28 February 2024 – 6 August 2024

Personal details
- Born: 23 August 1963 (age 61)
- Political party: Awami League
- Occupation: Politician, entrepreneur, businesswoman

Nadia Binte Amin (born 23 August 1963) is a politician and businesswoman. She is a former 12th Jatiya Sangsad member from a women's reserved seat for Netrakona District.

She is president of Women Entrepreneurs Network for Development Association. She is also general body member of Federation of Bangladesh Chambers of Commerce & Industries.

== Early life and education ==
Nadia was born on 23 August 1963. Her father was a freedom fighter named A.F.M. Aminul Islam Tara. She obtained her SSC from Viqarunnisa Noon School and College in 1980, HSC from Holy Cross College, Dhaka in 1982 and bachelor's degree under University of Dhaka. She obtained her MBA degree from IBA in 1990, then her MPhil and PhD degrees also from IBA.
