= Selina Islam =

Bangladeshi politician

- সেলিনা ইসলাম

Member of Parliament for Reserved Women's Seat-49
- In office 20 February 2019 – 2024
- Preceded by: Sabiha Nahar Begum

Personal details
- Born: 10 August 1976 (age 49)
- Party: Independent
- Spouse: Mohammad Shahid Islam
- Children: 3 daughters

Selina Islam (also known as Selina Islam Papul) is a Bangladeshi controversial business person who later joins politics. She nominated as Jatiya Sangsad member from the reserved women's seat-49.

== Early life ==
Islam was born in the Sonakanda village in Meghna Upazila of Comilla District to Mojibur Rahman and Amina Begum. She is married to Mohammad Shahid Islam, the incumbent Jatiya Sangsad member representing the Lakshmipur-2 constituency.

== Career ==
Islam is a Kuwaiti expatriate business person. She is the vice-president of Comilla north district of Bangladesh Awami League. She was elected as an independent candidate from the reserved women's seat-49 of the eleventh Jatiya Sangsad. Shirin Sharmin Chaudhury administered the oath to her on 20 February 2019.

On 26 December 2020, Islam was granted bail when she surrendered herself before a Dhaka court for a graft case filed earlier by the Anti-Corruption Commission. The court also ordered the authorities to freeze 670 bank accounts of Islam and three of her family members - her husband, Mohammad Shahid Islam; their daughter, Wafa Islam; and her sister, Jesmin Prodhan; in cases filed over corruption and money laundering. The ACC case stated that though Selina Islam's sister Jesmin Pradhan has no source of income, she had 44 accounts in different banks.

In May 2025, the Detective Branch arrested Islam in Gulshan, Dhaka. She was shown arrested in a case filed by the Anti-Corruption Commission.
