= Selina Jahan Lita =

Bangladeshi politician

Member of Parliament
- In office January 2014 – 2019

Personal details
- Born: 1970 (age 55–56)
- Party: Bangladesh Awami League

Selina Jahan Lita is a Bangladesh Awami League politician and Member of Parliament.

== Biography ==
Lita was born in 1960 in Sandharoi, Ranisankail, Thakurgaon District, East Pakistan, Pakistan. Her father was Ali Akbar. Ali was an organiser of Bangladesh Liberation war in 1971 and a former Member of Parliament of Bangladesh. In 1999 Selina graduated from University of Rajshahi after completing her M.A. and joined the Bikrampur K.B Degree College as a lecturer of Bengali language. In 2009 she was elected Ranisankail Upazila Vice-Chairman and in 2014 she was re-elected Vice-Chairman. She was also the President of Thakurgaon District Mohila League, the women's wing of Bangladesh Awami League. She was nominated to the reserved seats for women in Bangladesh Parliament by Bangladesh Awami League in 2014.

Lita was sworn into office on 23 March 2014 along with 47 other MPs from the reserved seats by Speaker of the Parliament Shirin Sharmin Chaudhury. The 48 candidates were elected unopposed to the Parliament of Bangladesh from the reserved seats for women. She is a member of the Parliamentary Standing Committee on the Ministry of Water Resources. On 22 December 2015 she attended the National Policy on Older Persons-2013 roundtable that discussed the national policy on senior citizens and its implementation. She was injured along with her chauffeur after her car crashed into a tree after swerving to avoid a pedestrian near Pundra University of Science and Technology on Dhaka-Rangpur highway on 18 March 2016.
