= Nuruddin Chowdhury Noyon =

Bangladeshi politician

- নুর উদ্দিন চৌধুরী নয়ন

Member of the Bangladesh Parliament for Lakshmipur-2
- In office 28 June 2021 – 6 August 2024
- Preceded by: Mohammad Shahid Islam

Personal details
- Born: 16 December 1964 (age 61)
- Party: Bangladesh Awami League

Nuruddin Chowdhury Noyon (born 16 December 1964) is a Bangladesh Awami League politician and a former Jatiya Sangsad member representing the Lakshmipur-2 constituency.

== Career ==
Noyon is the general secretary of the Laxmipur district Awami League. On 28 January 2021, Mohammad Shahid Islam, a member of parliament from Laxmipur-2 constituency, was sentenced to 7 years imprisonment by a criminal court in Kuwait. On 11 February 2021, he lost his seat as a member of parliament under Articles 66 and 67 of the Constitution of Bangladesh.

Noyon was elected member of parliament on 28 June 2021 in the by-election of zero seats.
