= Laila Parvin Sejuti =

Bangladeshi politician

Laila Parveen
- লায়লা পারভীন

Member of the Bangladesh Parliament for Reserved women's seat-13
- In office 28 February 2024 – 6 August 2024
- Preceded by: Sultana Nadira
- Succeeded by: Mahmuda Habiba

Personal details
- Party: Bangladesh Awami League

Laila Parvin Sejuti (born 2 October 1976) is a Bangladeshi politician from the Satkhira district. She served as a former member of the Jatiya Sangsad from the reserved women's list in the 12th National Parliament as a member of the Awami League.

After the fall of the Sheikh Hasina-led Awami League government, Sejuti was detained by the Detective Branch and Satkhira Sadar Police Station in a joint operation from Satkhira District under the Special Power Act, 1974.
