= Shamima Harun Lubna =

Bangladeshi politician

- শামীমা হারুন লুবনা

Member of the Bangladesh Parliament for Reserved women's seat-45
- In office 28 February 2024 – 6 August 2024
- Preceded by: Monira Sultana

Personal details
- Born: 7 May 1966 (age 59)
- Party: Bangladesh Awami League

Shamima Harun Lubna (born 7 May 1966) is a Awami League politician and a former Jatiya Sangsad member from a women's reserved for Chittagong District. She is the General Secretary of the Bangladesh Mohila Awami League Chittagong South District unit.
