= Nurjahan Begum Mukta =

Bangladeshi politician

- নূরজাহান বেগম মুক্তা
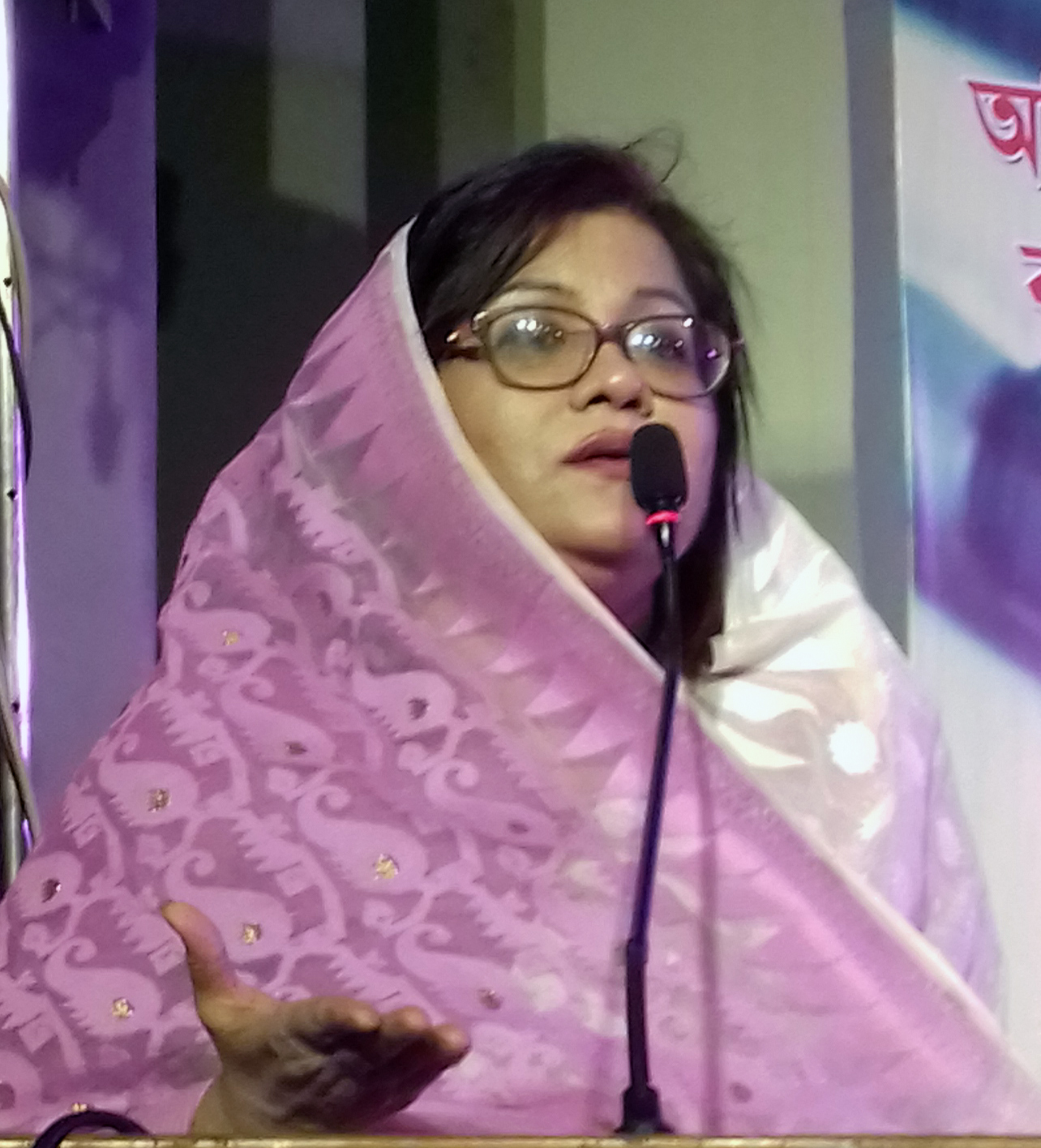
- Mukta in 2019

Member of the Bangladesh Parliament for Reserved Women's Seat-30
- In office 29 January 2014 – 28 January 2019
- Preceded by: Nasrin Jahan Ratna

Personal details
- Born: 1 December 1965 (age 60) Chandpur, East Pakistan, Pakistan
- Party: Bangladesh Awami League
- Parent: Abu Zafar Mohammad Mainuddin (father)
- Education: University of Dhaka
- Profession: Lawyer, politician

Nurjahan Begum Mukta (born 1 December 1965) is a Bangladeshi lawyer and a politician representing the Bangladesh Awami League party. She was a member of the Jatiya Sangsad.

== Career ==
Mukta was born on 1 December 1965 at the village Saisila in Hajiganj, Chandpur. She completed her higher secondary level at Chandpur and then obtained her honors and master's degree from the Law Faculty of Dhaka University. Her father Abu Zafar Mohammad Mainuddin was also a lawyer and politician and became an MP-elect at the first parliament election of independent Bangladesh in 1973. He was an activist of 6 Points movement, Language Movement of 1952, actively participated at the liberation war and helped reconstructing the post-war liberated country.

=== Politics ===
Mukta became an activist of Bangladesh Chatro League since her student life. She was the general secretary of Shamsunnahar Hall committee of the student wing while studying at Dhaka University. She took initiative to reorganize the hall committees of the student wing and participated at the 1990 Mass Uprising in Bangladesh movement. As a grass-root level politician she has been honored with a number of port-folios like law secretary of Hajiganj Upazilla Awami League, women secretary of Chandpur Jubo Mohila League, president of Chandpur Mohila Awami League and international affairs secretary of Central Mohila Awami League. Mukta was selected for the first time as a member of the parliament at the 10th National Parliament from the constituent seat 42 on 19 March 2014. As a parliamentarian she was outspoken on some vital issues like surgical problems of women, problems of carrying huge books by kids, food safely etc.

Mukta served as a prosecutor of the International Crime Tribunal and a deputy attorney general. She was involved with the politics of Bangladesh Awami League during her student life. She was elected as a member of the Jatiya Sangsad in 2014 Bangladeshi general election.
