= Dewan Shahjahan Eaar Chowdhury =

Former Bangladeshi politician

- দেওয়ান শাহজাহান ইয়ার চৌধুরী

Member of Parliament from Netrokona-5
- In office 1986–1990

Personal details
- Born: Netrokona district
- Party: Jatiya Party

Dewan Shahjahan Eaar Chowdhury is a former Bangladeshi politician. He was elected a member of parliament in 1986 and 1988.

== Birth and early life ==
Dewan Shahjahan Eaar Chowdhury was born in Netrokona district.

== Career ==
Dewan Shahjahan Eaar Chowdhury was a Jatiya Party politician. He was elected a member of parliament in 1986 and 1988 from Netrokona-5.
