= Ahmad Hossain =

Bangladeshi politician

Member of the Bangladesh Parliament for Netrokona-5
- In office 30 January 2024 – 6 August 2024
- Preceded by: Waresat Hussain Belal

Personal details
- Born: 30 November 1954 (age 71)
- Party: Bangladesh Awami League

Ahmad Hossain (born 30 November 1954) is a Bangladeshi politician and a former Jatiya Sangsad member representing the Netrokona-5 constituency. He is the organising secretary of Central Executive committee of Bangladesh Awami League.

== Career ==
Hossain was elected to parliament from Netrokona-5 as an Awami League candidate on 7 January 2024. He is the Organizing Secretary of the Awami League.
