= Aman Ullah Chowdhury =

Bangladeshi politician

Aman Ullah
- আমান উল্যাহ চৌধুরী
- In office 1986–1988
- Preceded by: Fazlur Rahman Sultan
- Succeeded by: M. A. Hamid
- In office 1991 – June 1996
- Preceded by: M. A. Hamid
- Succeeded by: Mohammed Amanullah

Personal details
- Born: Bhaluka, Mymensingh District
- Died: 8 June 2014 Square Hospital, Dhaka
- Party: Bangladesh Nationalist Party
- Other political affiliations: Bangladesh Muslim League
- Spouse: Rahija Khanam Jhunu
- Parent: Aftab Uddin Chowdhury (father)

Aman Ullah Chowdhury was a Bangladesh Nationalist Party politician and a member of parliament for Mymensingh-11.

== Career ==
Chowdhury was elected to parliament from Mymensingh-11 as a Bangladesh Muslim League candidate in 1986 and as a Bangladesh Nationalist Party candidate in 1991 and February 1996.

== Death ==
Chowdhury died on 8 June 2014 in Square Hospital, Dhaka.
