= Jinnatul Bakia =

Bangladeshi politician

- জিন্নাতুল বাকিয়া

Member of the Bangladesh Parliament for Reserved Women's Seat-2
- In office 20 February 2019 – 2024

Personal details
- Born: 20 April 1963 (age 62)
- Party: Bangladesh Awami League
- Education: Class 8
- Occupation: Housewife

Jinnatul Bakia is a Bangladesh Awami League politician and a member of the Bangladesh Parliament from a reserved seat.

== Career ==
Bakia was elected to parliament from a reserved seat as a Bangladesh Awami League candidate in 2019.
