= Jharna Hasan =

Bangladeshi politician

- ঝর্না হাসান

Member of the Bangladesh Parliament for Reserved women's seat-36
- In office 28 February 2024 – 6 August 2024
- Preceded by: Dorothy Rahman

Personal details
- Born: 1 January 1971 (age 55)
- Party: Bangladesh Awami League

Jharna Hasan (born 1 January 1971) is a Awami League politician and a former Jatiya Sangsad member from a women's reserved for Faridpur District.
