= Mohammed Amanullah =

Bangladeshi politician (1939–2021)

- মোহাম্মদ আমানউল্লাহ

Member of Parliament Mymensingh-11
- In office Jun 1996 – 2018
- Preceded by: Aman Ullah Chowdhury
- Succeeded by: Kazim Uddin Ahmed

Personal details
- Born: 16 March 1939 Bhaluka
- Died: 11 March 2021 (aged 81) Dhaka
- Party: Bangladesh Awami League

Mohammed Amanullah (Bengali: মোহাম্মদ আমানউল্লাহ, 16 March 1939 – 11 March 2021) was a Bangladesh Awami League politician and former Member of Parliament from Mymensingh-11.

== Early life ==
Amanullah was born on 16 March 1939. He went to medical school and completed a M.B.B.S. degree.

== Career ==
Amanullah was elected to Parliament from Mymensingh-11 as a candidate of Bangladesh Awami League.

== Death ==
Amanullah died on 11 March 2021.
