= Safura Begum =

Bangladeshi politician

Member of Bangladesh Parliament
- In office 10 April 2014 – 30 December 2018

Personal details
- Party: Bangladesh Awami League

Safura Begum (Bengali: সফুরা বেগম), also known as Safura Begum Rumi, is a Bangladesh Awami League politician. She served as a member of the Jatiya Sangsad from a reserved women's seat representing Lalmonirhat and Kurigram districts from 2014 to 2019. She also served as president of the Lalmonirhat District unit of the Awami Mohila League and President of the Lalmonirhat District Bar Association. In April 2026, she was arrested by Bangladesh Police.

== Early life ==
Begum was born on 11 March 1959. She graduated with a law degree. Her husband is Md Abdullah from Lalmonirhat.

== Career ==
In 2013, Begum was the public prosecutor for Lalmonirhat District. She successfully prosecuted the Parvina Begum rape and murder case.

Begum was elected to parliament from a reserved seat-2 (Lalmonirhat-Kurigram) as a Bangladesh Awami League candidate in 2014. She was a member of the central Awami League. She is the President of the Lalmonirhat District unit of the Awami Mohila League, the women's wing of the Awami League. She is a lawyer by trade. She previously served as general secretary of the Lalmonirhat District Bar Association. She had previously served as the President of the District Bar Association.

In June 2024, Begum attended a government programme in Lalmonirhat where Prime Minister Sheikh Hasina distributed 1,623 houses to landless and homeless families under the Ashrayan-2 project. She was a member of the Awami League Central Working Committee.

After the fall of the Sheikh Hasina led Awami League government, Rumi was arrested in April 2026 by Lalmonirhat district police Detective Branch from Mohammadpur, Dhaka. At the time of her arrest, she was facing five cases in Dhaka, Lalmonirhat and Rangpur, according to police. Police alleged she was supporting the Awami League, whose activities have been banned, under the Joy Bangla Brigade bannar. She was one of 134 former Members of Parliament from the Awami League detained after the fall of the government.
