= Sabina Akter Tuhin =

Bangladeshi politician

Member of Bangladesh Parliament
- In office 10 April 2014 – 30 December 2018

Personal details
- Political party: Bangladesh Awami League

Sabina Akter Tuhin (Bengali: সাবিনা আক্তার তুহিন) is a Bangladesh Awami League politician and a former member of parliament from a reserved seat.

== Career ==
Tuhin was elected to parliament from a reserved seat as a Bangladesh Awami League candidate in 2014. On 9 May 2016, her supporters clashed with supporters of a fellow Awami League member of parliament, Aslamul Haque.

Tuhin was arrested in June 2025 following the fall of the Sheikh Hasina led Awami League government from Nawabganj Upazila.
