= Rahima Akhter =

Bangladeshi politician

Member of Bangladesh Parliament
- In office 10 April 2014 – 30 December 2018

Personal details
- Political party: Bangladesh Awami League

Rahima Akhter (Bengali: রহিমা আক্তার) is a Bangladesh Awami League politician and a former member of the Bangladesh Parliament from a reserved seat.

== Career ==
Akhter was elected to parliament from a reserved seat as a Bangladesh Awami League candidate in 2014.
