= Refat Amin =

Bangladeshi politician

Member of Bangladesh Parliament
- In office 10 April 2014 – 30 December 2018

Personal details
- Party: Bangladesh Awami League

Refat Amin (Bengali: রিফাত আমিন) is a Bangladesh Awami League politician and a former member of the Bangladesh Parliament from a reserved seat.

== Early life ==
Amin was born on 21 April 1953. She studied up to the Higher Secondary Certificate level.

== Career ==
Amin was elected to parliament from a reserved seat as a Bangladesh Awami League candidate in 2014.
