= Khaleda Bahar Beauty =

Bangladesh Awami League politician

- খালেদা বাহার বিউটি

Member of the Bangladesh Parliament for Reserved Women's Seat-16
- In office 28 February 2024 – 6 August 2024

Personal details
- Born: 1 January 1963 (age 63)
- Party: Awami League

Khaleda Bahar Beauty (born 1 January 1963) is a Bangladesh Awami League politician from Bhola and a former Jatiya Sangsad member from a women's reserved seat.
