= Sabera Begum =

Bangladeshi politician (born 1963)

Member of the Bangladesh Parliament for Reserved women's seat-26
- In office 28 February 2024 – 6 August 2024
- Preceded by: Zakia Parvin Khanam

Personal details
- Born: 8 April 1963 (age 63)
- Party: Bangladesh Awami League

Sabera Begum (born 8 April 1963) is a Awami League politician and a former Jatiya Sangsad member from a women's reserved for Dhaka District.
