= Parul Akhtar =

Bangladeshi politician

- পারুল আক্তার

Member of the Bangladesh Parliament for Reserved women's seat-25
- In office 28 February 2024 – 6 August 2024
- Preceded by: Habiba Rahman Khan

Personal details
- Born: 10 August 1972 (age 53)
- Party: Bangladesh Awami League

Parul Akhtar (born 10 August 1972) is a Awami League politician and a former Jatiya Sangsad member from a women's reserved for Dhaka District.
