= Chanuar Hossain Chanu =

Bangladeshi politician

- ছানোয়ার হোসেন ছানু

Member of the Bangladesh Parliament for Sherpur-1
- In office 30 January 2024 – 6 August 2024
- Preceded by: Md. Atiur Rahman Atik
- Succeeded by: Rashedul Islam

Personal details
- Born: 1 October 1966 (age 60)
- Occupation: Politician

Chanuar Hossain Chanu (born 1 October 1966) is a Bangladeshi politician. He is a former Jatiya Sangsad member representing the Sherpur-1 constituency in 2024.

== Political life ==
Chanuar Hossain Chanu was elected to parliament for the Sherpur-1 constituency as an independent candidate in the 2024 Bangladeshi general election.
