= Shah Rafiqul Bari Chowdhury =

Bangladeshi diplomat and politician

Member of Bangladesh Parliament

Personal details
- Party: Jatiya Party (Ershad)

Shah Rafiqul Bari Chowdhury is a Jatiya Party (Ershad) politician and a former member of parliament for Sherpur-1.

== Career ==
Chowdhury was elected to parliament from Sherpur-1 as a Jatiya Party candidate in 1986, 1988, and 1991.

== Life ==
Shah Rafiqul Bari Chowdhury unfortunately passed away in August 15 2025 in 1:30 PM
