= Waresat Hussain Belal =

Bangladeshi politician

- ওয়ারেসাত হোসেন বেলাল

Member of 11th Jatiya Sangsad

Member of Parliament for Netrokona-5
- In office 3rd
- Incumbent
- Assumed office 2015

Personal details
- Born: 25 July 1954 (age 71)
- Party: Bangladesh Awami League
- Education: HSC
- Awards: Bir Protik

Waresat Hussain Belal (Bengali: ওয়ারেসাত হোসেন বেলাল) is a Bangladesh Awami League politician and the incumbent member of parliament from Netrokona-5.

== Early life ==
Belal was born on 25 July 1954. He graduated with an H.S.C. degree. He fought in the Bangladesh Liberation War and was awarded the gallantry award Bir Protik.

== Career ==
Belal was elected to parliament in 2014 from Netrokona-5 as a candidate of the Bangladesh Awami League. On 15 August 2018, a rally organized by him broke into fights between different factions of Bangladesh Awami League.

== Controversy ==
Belal became embroiled in controversy after his wife accused a woman of blackmailing him into marriage. In 2023, she filed a case at Purba Dhola Police Station, alleging that nine people, including the woman, conspired to kidnap her husband and forge a marriage certificate. Locals and party officials disputed the kidnapping claim, noting that Belal attended multiple party events during the alleged incident.
