= Netrokona-5 =

Constituency of Bangladesh's Jatiya Sangsad

- Constituency for the Jatiya Sangsad
- District: Netrokona District
- Division: Mymensingh Division
- Electorate: 290,117 (2026)

Current constituency
- Created: 1984 (Original); 2008 (Redistricted)
- Party: Bangladesh Jamaat-e-Islami
- Member: Mashum Mostafa
- ← 160 Netrokona-4 162 Kishoreganj-1 →

Netrokona-5 is a constituency represented in the Jatiya Sangsad (National Parliament) of Bangladesh since 2026 by Mashum Mostafa of the Bangladesh Jamaat-e-Islami.

== Boundaries ==
The constituency encompasses Purbadhala Upazila.

== Members of Parliament ==
| Election | Member | Party |
|---|---|---|
| 1986 | Dewan Shahjahan Eaar Chowdhury | Jatiya Party (Ershad) |
Major Boundary Changes
| 2008 | Waresat Hussain Belal | Awami League |
| 2014 | Waresat Hussain Belal | Awami League |
| 2018 | Waresat Hussain Belal | Awami League |
| 2024 | Ahmad Hossain | Awami League |
| 2026 | Mashum Mostafa | Bangladesh Jamaat-e-Islami |

== Elections ==
General Election 2026: Netrokona-5
| Party | Candidate | Votes | % | ±% |
|---|---|---|---|---|
| Jamaat | Mashum Mostafa | 82,117 | 49.22 | N/A |
| BNP | Abu Taher Talukder | 79,412 | 47.59 | N/A |
| Majority | | 2,705 | 1.62 | N/A |
| Turnout | | 166,861 | 57.52 | −6.74 |
| Registered electors | | 290,117 | | |
| Jamaat gain from AL | | | | |
