= Mohammad Abdul Waheed =

Bangladeshi politician

- মোহাম্মদ আব্দুল ওয়াহেদ

Member of the Bangladesh Parliament for Mymensingh-11
- In office 30 January 2024 – 6 August 2024
- Preceded by: Kazim Uddin Ahmed

Personal details
- Born: 12 April 1966 (age 60) Mymensingh, East Pakistan, Pakistan
- Party: Independent
- Other political affiliations: Awami League
- Occupation: Businessman and politician

Mohammad Abdul Waheed, known as M. A. Waheed, is a Bangladeshi Independent politician and a former Jatiya Sangsad member representing the Mymensingh-11 constituency.

== Career ==
Abdul Waheed was elected to parliament from Mymensingh-11 as an independent candidate on 7 January 2024.
