= Hosne Ara =

Bangladeshi politician

Member of Bangladesh Parliament Reserved Women's Seat-16
- In office 20 February 2019 – 28 February 2024

Personal details
- Born: 15 July 1962 (age 64)
- Party: Bangladesh Awami League

Hosne Ara is a Bangladesh Awami League politician and a member of the Bangladesh Parliament from reserved women's seat no. 16.

== Career ==
Ara was elected to parliament from reserved seat as a Bangladesh Awami League candidate in 2019.
