= Mahafuza Sultana =

Bangladeshi politician (born 1974)

Mahafuza Sultana Moly

Member of the Bangladesh Parliament for Reserved Women's Seat-6
- In office 28 February 2024 – 6 August 2024

Personal details
- Born: 20 November 1974 (age 50); Joypurhat, Rajshahi
- Political party: Awami League
- Occupation: Politician

Mahafuza Sultana Moly (born 20 November 1974) is a Bangladesh Awami League politician and a former member of the Jatiya Sangsad representing a women's reserved seat.
