= Sherpur-1 =

Constituency of Bangladesh's Jatiya Sangsad

Coordinates: 25.01°N 90.02°E

- Constituency for the Jatiya Sangsad
- District: Sherpur District
- Division: Mymensingh Division
- Electorate: 423,664 (2024)

Current constituency
- Created: 1984
- ← 142 Jamalpur-5 144 Sherpur-2 →

Sherpur-1 is a constituency represented in the Jatiya Sangsad (National Parliament) of Bangladesh. Since 17 February 2026, this constituency is represented by Bangladesh Jaamat-e-islami candidate Rashedul Islam.

== Boundaries ==
The constituency encompasses Sherpur Sadar Upazila.

== History ==
The constituency was created in 1984 from a Mymensingh constituency when the former Mymensingh District was split into four districts: Mymensingh, Sherpur, Netrokona, and Kishoreganj.

== Members of Parliament ==
Election	Member	Party
1986	Shah Rafiqul Bari Chowdhury	Jatiya Party
Feb 1996	Nazrul Islam	BNP
Jun 1996	Atiur Rahman Atik	Awami League
2024	Chanuar Hossain Chanu	Independent
2026	Rashedul Islam	Bangladesh Jamaat-e-Islami

== Elections ==
=== Elections in the 2010s ===
General Election 2014: Sherpur-1
Party	Candidate	Votes	%	±%
AL	Atiur Rahman Atik	207,377	97.0	+42.0
JSD	Abu Saleh Manirul Islam	6,417	3.0	N/A
Majority		200,960	94.0	+83.5
Turnout		213,794	67.5	−19.1
AL hold				

=== Elections in the 2000s ===
General Election 2008: Sherpur-1
Party	Candidate	Votes	%	±%
AL	Atiur Rahman Atik	136,127	55.0	+11.5
Jamaat	Muhammad Kamaruzzaman	110,070	44.4	+11.3
KSJL	Md. Shofiullah	514	0.2	−0.1
BTF	Kazi Azharul Islam	377	0.2	N/A
Bangladesh Kalyan Party	Md. Tafazzal Hossain Akanda	332	0.1	N/A
Independent	Afil Shakh	294	0.1	N/A
Majority		26,057	10.5	+0.1
Turnout		247,714	86.6	+15.2
AL hold				

General Election 2001: Sherpur-1
Party	Candidate	Votes	%	±%
AL	Atiur Rahman Atik	86,101	43.5	+5.5
Jamaat	Muhammad Kamaruzzaman	65,490	33.1	+17.2
Jatiya Party (M)	Shah Rafiqul Bari Chowdhury	23,002	11.6	N/A
IJOF	Md. Elias Uddin	22,723	11.5	N/A
KSJL	Md. Samedul Haq Khan	517	0.3	N/A
Majority		20,611	10.4	−1.3
Turnout		197,833	71.4	+4.5
AL hold				

=== Elections in the 1990s ===
General Election June 1996: Sherpur-1
Party	Candidate	Votes	%	±%
AL	Atiur Rahman Atik	51,787	38.0	+17.4
JP(E)	Rowshan Ershad	35,851	26.3	−1.0
Jamaat	Muhammad Kamaruzzaman	21,718	15.9	−0.5
BNP	Nazrul Islam	21,404	15.7	−3.0
Zaker Party	Md. Ruhul Kuddus	5,019	3.7	+1.6
BKA	Md. Matiur Rahman	272	0.2	N/A
FP	Md. Jubaidul Islam	187	0.1	N/A
Majority		15,936	11.7	+5.0
Turnout		136,238	66.9	+16.9
AL gain from JP(E)				

General Election 1991: Sherpur-1
Party	Candidate	Votes	%	±%
JP(E)	Shah Rafiqul Bari Chowdhury	31,108	27.3	
AL	Md. A. Samad	23,519	20.6	
BNP	Nazrul Islam	21,292	18.7	
Jamaat	Muhammad Kamaruzzaman	18,709	16.4	
Independent	Nizam Uddin Ahmed	15,562	13.7	
Zaker Party	Fazlul Kader Lutu	2,409	2.1	
JSD	Md. Saiful Islam	492	0.4	
Jatiya Samajtantrik Dal-JSD	Md. Sekandar Ali	457	0.4	
Bangladesh Muslim League (Kader)	Md. A. Kuddus	393	0.3	
Majority		7,589	6.7	
Turnout		113,941	50.0	
JP(E) hold				
