= Laila Arjuman Banu =

Bangladeshi politician

Member of Bangladesh Parliament
- In office 10 April 2014 – 30 December 2018

Personal details
- Party: Bangladesh Awami League

Laila Arjuman Banu (Bengali: লায়লা আরজুমান বানু) is a Bangladesh Awami League politician and a former member of the Bangladesh Parliament from a reserved seat.

== Early life ==
Banu was born on 15 August 1951 and she has a H.S.C. degree.

== Career ==
Banu was elected to parliament from a reserved seat as a Bangladesh Awami League candidate in 2014.
