= Selina Akhter Banu =

Bangladeshi politician

Member of Bangladesh Parliament
- In office 10 April 2014 – 30 December 2018

Personal details
- Party: Bangladesh Awami League

Selina Akhter Banu (Bengali: সেলিনা আখতার বানু) is a Bangladesh Awami League politician and a former member of the Bangladesh Parliament from a reserved seat.

== Career ==
Selina Akhter Banu was elected to parliament on 30 December 2018, representing the Bangladesh Awami League party. Her election was to a seat reserved for women.
