= Farida Akter Banu =

Bangladeshi politician

- ফরিদা আক্তার বানু

Member of the Bangladesh Parliament for Reserved Women's Seat-10
- In office 28 February 2024 – 6 August 2024

Personal details
- Born: 8 September 1955 (age 70) Bagerhat, East Pakistan, Pakistan
- Party: Awami League
- Occupation: Politician

Farida Akter Banu (born 8 September 1955) is a Bangladesh Awami League politician and a former Jatiya Sangsad member from a women's reserved seat.
