= Md. Atiur Rahman Atik =

Bangladeshi politician

MP Atiur Rahman Atik
- আতিউর রহমান আতিক
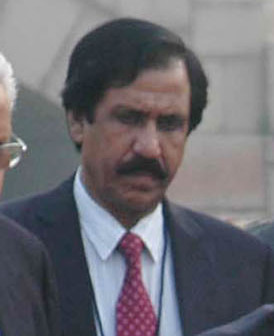
- Atik in 2014

Member of Parliament
- In office 12 June 1996 – 29 January 2024
- Preceded by: Nazrul Islam
- Succeeded by: Chanuar Hossain Chanu
- Constituency: Sherpur-1

Personal details
- Born: 1 December 1957 (age 68)
- Party: Bangladesh Awami League

Atiur Rahman Atik is a Bangladeshi politician. He represented Sherpur-1 in Parliament. He belongs to the Bangladesh Awami League Party.

== Early life ==
Atik was born on 1 December 1957. He has a B.A. degree.

== Career ==
Atik was elected to Jatiya Sangsad 5 times in 1996, 2001, 2008, 2014 and 2018 general elections.

In the 2024 general election he got the Awami League nomination but lost the election to Chanuar Hossain Chanu, another candidate from his party.

On 6 May 2016, Bangladesh Election Commission asked him to remove himself from his own constituency area for violating its electoral code of conduct. On 17 April 2018, he was investigated by Bangladesh Anti Corruption Commission after Bangladesh High Court ordered an investigation.

He was twice parliamentary whip. He was President of Bangladesh Awami League, Sherpur Jilla shakha three times.
