= Elias Mollah =

Bangladeshi politician

Elias Uddin Mollah

Member of the Bangladesh Parliament for Dhaka-16
- In office 29 December 2008 – 6 August 2024
- Preceded by: Post Established
- Succeeded by: Abdul Baten

Personal details
- Born: 2 March 1971 (age 55) Dhaka, East Pakistan, Pakistan
- Party: Bangladesh Awami League
- Parent: Harun Rashid Mollah (father)

Elias Uddin Mollah (born 2 March 1971) is a Bangladesh Awami League politician and a former member of Jatiyo Sangshad representing the Dhaka-16 constituency. He was elected from Dhaka-16 constituency.

== Biography ==
Elias was born to Harun Rashid Mollah, who was also an MP, and Ajma Begum. His paternal grandfather, Qudratullah Mollah, served as president of Mirpur union parishad for 27 years straight. Elias attended National Bangla High School. He has not studied beyond intermediate level.

== Controversies ==
=== Encroachment ===
Duaripara has reportedly been a major source of illicit income for Elias Mollah. While the National Housing Authority (NHA) allocated 473 plots in the area to government employees in 1981, the Waqf Estate, led by Mollah’s family, laid competing claims to the land. Exploiting this ownership dispute, Mollah gradually seized control of the plots from 1996 onward, allegedly extorting large sums from residents annually by threatening eviction. He also collected utility payments and rent but pocketed the money instead of transferring it to government accounts. In a related incident, Mollah's associates allegedly occupied a plot owned by ABM Siddique, breaking into the property under the leadership of his relative Amjad Mollah. Furthermore, a general diary filed on 11 September 2024 by Imamul Islam, a National Housing Authority official, reported illegal encroachments in Block 'Ka' of Section 8, Mirpur, Duaripara, involving 50-60 unidentified individuals occupying previously cleared government land.

==== Bangladesh National Zoo ====
Nearly two acres of land allocated for employee quarters at Bangladesh National Zoo in Gudaraghat's Lal Math area of Dakshin Bishil, Mirpur-1, has reportedly been illegally occupied by supporters of Elias Mollah. On April 13, 2009, the illegal occupants filed a petition with the land ministry seeking permission to vacate the zoo-designated land, with Elias Mollah providing a recommendation letter. Mollah stated, “Sir, I am recommending this,” but later clarified to Prothom Alo that while he made a recommendation as a member of the parliamentary standing committee on fisheries and livestock, he never suggested granting the land to the occupants. The Zoo director Rafiqul Islam Talukdar revealed that ABM Shahidullah, a former curator of the zoo and one of the occupants, forged a signature to present in court, falsely claiming the zoo no longer required the land. The forgery was exposed in court, which subsequently ruled to allocate the land back to the zoo. While the occupants appealed the decision, the appeal was dismissed, and they have since filed for a review.

==== Turag Riverbank ====
Behind Mollah's residence near Molla Market in Mirpur-12, a section of the Turag River reportedly filled in to construct a slum known as "Elias Mollah's Slum," housing over 200 illegal structures with unauthorized utility connections. Locals allege that Mollah established an armed cadre to instill fear and engage in extortion from slums, markets, shops, and bus stands.

==== Persecution of Minority ====
On 6 September 2024, Mollah was accused of encroaching on the Sri Sri Gaur Nitai temple in Pallabi, Dhaka, and assaulting clerics and devotees. At a press conference held at the Jatiya Press Club, temple cleric Subendu Talukdar alleged that Mollah supported members of the Sudhir group in occupying the temple and harassing its followers. Despite resolving a prior land dispute and beginning temple construction, the Sudhir group, allegedly backed by Mollah, attempted to seize control again. Subendu also claimed that in 2018, Mollah physically assaulted him and other devotees at the temporary temple and looted approximately Tk10 lakh. He further accused Mollah’s associates of filing false cases to intimidate him and demanded legal action against Mollah and Sudhir to ensure justice.

==== 2014 Kalshi clashes ====
In 2014 he was accused of being involved in an arson attack on a refugee camp of Stranded Pakistanis in Mirpur, Dhaka in which 10 people died. Mollah denied involvement and blamed a "vested conspiracy" against him.

=== Racism ===
In 2015 Elias made racist comments about black people. After a recent trip to the Congo, he said to journalists:

Our army has gone there (Africa) to civilise those black people. I am sure they will accomplish the task.

He constantly referred to the Congolese as "uncivilized black people" and added "People there are yet to become civilised. They take bath every 15 days. After applying soaps before bath, they do not even use water in a bid to retain the aroma." When pointed out that he was being racist and whether the UN had entrusted the Bangladeshi peacekeepers with the responsibility to make Africans "civilised", Mollah said, "No... we are only assisting them to get civilised."

=== Corruption allegations ===
In 2016 he was accused of attempting to illegally occupy private homes.
