= Ummi Farzana Sattar =

Bangladeshi politician

Ummy Farzana Sattar
- উম্মি ফরজানা ছাত্তার

Member of Parliament for Reserved women's seat-21
- In office 28 February 2024 – 6 August 2024

Personal details
- Born: 9 February 1984 (age 42) Dhaka, Bangladesh
- Party: Awami League
- Education: University of London
- Occupation: Politician and lawyer

Ummy Farzana Sattar (born 9 February 1984) is a Bangladeshi politician, lawyer and a former Jatiya Sangsad member representing the Reserved Women's Seat-21 for Mymensingh District. In 2024, she was a member of the Parliamentary Standing Committee on Ministry of Law Justice and Parliamentary Affairs.

== Early life and education ==
Barristar Farzana Sattar was born on 9 February 1984 in Dhaka. Her father, veteran Freedom Fighter Abdus Sattar was a member of the parliament two times and the former Commerce and Industry Affairs Secretary of Bangladesh Awami League.

Farzana has completed L.L.B. Honours from the University of London, LLM from the City University of London and Barrister-at-Law.

== Career ==
Farzana was called to the Bar of England and Wales. After completing Barrister-at-Law, she returned to Bangladesh and became member of Bangladesh Bar Council in 2010 and enrolled as an advocate of the Bangladesh Supreme Court. She was senior associate of Barrister Tanjib-Ul-Alam from 2010 to 2016. She is an activist on human rights issues, women's empowerment and works on elimination of all forms of discrimination against Women.
