= Mymensingh-11 =

Constituency of Bangladesh's Jatiya Sangsad

Coordinates: 24.40°N 90.39°E

- Constituency for the Jatiya Sangsad
- District: Mymensingh District
- Division: Mymensingh Division
- Electorate: 294,788 (2018)

Current constituency
- Created: 1973
- MP: Fakhruddin Ahmed
- ← 155 Mymensingh-10 157 Netrokona-1 →

Mymensingh-11 is a constituency represented in the Jatiya Sangsad (National Parliament) of Bangladesh.

== Boundaries ==
The constituency encompasses Bhaluka Upazila.

== History ==
The constituency was created for the first general elections in newly independent Bangladesh, held in 1973.

== Members of Parliament ==
| Election | Member | Party |
|---|---|---|
| 1973 | Nazim Uddin | Awami League |
| 1979 | Fazlur Rahman Sultan | BNP |
| 1986 | Aman Ullah Chowdhury | Muslim League |
| 1988 | M. A. Hamid | Jatiya Party |
| 1991 | Aman Ullah Chowdhury | BNP |
| 1996 | Mohammed Amanullah | Awami League |
| 2018 | Kazim Uddin Ahmed | Awami League |
| 2024 | Abdul Wahed | Independent |
| 2026 | Fakhar Uddin Ahmed | BNP |

== Elections ==
=== Elections in the 2010s ===
General Election 2014: Mymensingh-11
| Party | Candidate | Votes | % | ±% |
|---|---|---|---|---|
| AL | Mohammed Amanullah | 91,362 | 89.3 | +21.3 |
| Independent | Md. Shahadat Islam Chowdhury | 10,406 | 10.2 | N/A |
| JP(E) | Md. Hafiz Uddin | 486 | 0.5 | N/A |
| Majority | | 80,956 | 79.2 | +42.6 |
| Turnout | | 102,254 | 38.9 | −47.5 |
| AL hold | | | | |

=== Elections in the 2000s ===
General Election 2008: Mymensingh-11
| Party | Candidate | Votes | % | ±% |
|---|---|---|---|---|
| AL | Mohammad Amanullah | 137,375 | 68.0 | +14.9 |
| BNP | Fakhruddin Ahmed Bachchu | 63,376 | 31.4 | −4.9 |
| Bangladesh Kalyan Party | Mohammad Kamrul Hasan | 561 | 0.3 | N/A |
| KSJL | Md. Abdullah | 464 | 0.2 | N/A |
| CPB | Md. Mozammel Haque | 257 | 0.1 | N/A |
| Majority | | 73,999 | 36.6 | +19.8 |
| Turnout | | 202,033 | 86.4 | +11.1 |
| AL hold | | | | |

General Election 2001: Mymensingh-11
| Party | Candidate | Votes | % | ±% |
|---|---|---|---|---|
| AL | Mohammad Amanullah | 78,651 | 53.1 | +1.1 |
| BNP | Shah Mohammad Faruque | 53,771 | 36.3 | +12.5 |
| Independent | Md. Mohiuddin | 13,315 | 9.0 | N/A |
| IJOF | Md. Saif Ullah Chowdhury | 2,397 | 1.6 | N/A |
| Majority | | 24,880 | 16.8 | −11.3 |
| Turnout | | 148,134 | 75.3 | +2.0 |
| AL hold | | | | |

=== Elections in the 1990s ===
General Election June 1996: Mymensingh-11
| Party | Candidate | Votes | % | ±% |
|---|---|---|---|---|
| AL | Mohammad Amanullah | 57,131 | 52.0 | +11.7 |
| BNP | Aman Ullah Chowdhury | 26,209 | 23.8 | −17.2 |
| JP(E) | Rowshan Ershad | 23,715 | 21.6 | +19.2 |
| Jamaat | Sheikh Abdur Rahman | 2,107 | 1.9 | −2.2 |
| CPB | Md. Mozammel Haque | 407 | 0.4 | N/A |
| Zaker Party | Md. Rafiqul Islam Shamim | 391 | 0.4 | +0.1 |
| Majority | | 30,922 | 28.1 | +27.4 |
| Turnout | | 109,960 | 73.3 | +17.6 |
| AL gain from BNP | | | | |

General Election 1991: Mymensingh-11
| Party | Candidate | Votes | % | ±% |
|---|---|---|---|---|
| BNP | Aman Ullah Chowdhury | 35,959 | 41.0 | |
| AL | Mostafa M. A. Matin | 35,347 | 40.3 | |
| Independent | Zolhas Uddin Talukdar | 7,539 | 8.6 | |
| Jamaat | Khorshed Uddin Pathan | 3,568 | 4.1 | |
| JP(E) | M. A. Hamid | 2,146 | 2.4 | |
| Independent | Shahadat Islam Chowdhury | 1,992 | 2.3 | |
| BAKSAL | M. A. Kashem | 388 | 0.4 | |
| JSD | S. M. Sadik Hossain | 286 | 0.3 | |
| Zaker Party | Azizur Rahman | 223 | 0.3 | |
| Jatiya Samajtantrik Dal-JSD | Md. Majibur Rahman | 195 | 0.2 | |
| Majority | | 612 | 0.7 | |
| Turnout | | 87,643 | 55.7 | |
| BNP gain from JP(E) | | | | |
