= Sabiha Nahar Begum =

Bangladeshi politician

Member of Parliament for Reserved Women's Seat-49
- In office 10 April 2014 – 30 December 2018
- Succeeded by: Selina Islam

Personal details
- Born: 15 January 1950 (age 76)
- Party: Bangladesh Awami League

Sabiha Nahar Begum (born 15 January 1950) is Bangladesh Awami League politician and Member of the Parliament. She was elected from reserved seats for women during 10th Jatiya Sangsad election in 2014.

== Background ==
Begum was born on 15 January 1950. She nominated to the Parliament of Bangladesh as part of the 50 reserved seats for women, as a candidate from Bangladesh Awami League.
