= Dhaka-16 =

Constituency of Bangladesh's Jatiya Sangsad

Coordinates: 23.83°N 90.36°E

- Constituency for the Jatiya Sangsad
- District: Dhaka District
- Division: Dhaka Division
- Electorate: 400,499 (2026)

Current constituency
- Created: 1973 (Original); 2008 (Redistricted)
- Party: Bangladesh Jamaat-e-Islami
- Member: Abdul Baten
- ← 188 Dhaka-15 190 Dhaka-17 →

Dhaka-16 is a constituency represented in the Jatiya Sangsad (National Parliament) of Bangladesh since 2026 by Abdul Baten of the Bangladesh Jamaat-e-Islami.

== Boundaries ==
The constituency encompasses Dhaka North City Corporation wards 2, 3, 5, and 6.

== History ==
The constituency was created when, ahead of the 2008 general election, the Election Commission redrew constituency boundaries to reflect population changes revealed by the 2001 Bangladesh census. The 2008 redistricting added 7 new seats to the Dhaka metropolitan area, increasing the number of constituencies in the capital from 8 to 15.

== Members of Parliament ==
Election	Member	Party
1973	Shamsul Haq	Awami League
1979	Abul Kashem	Bangladesh Nationalist Party
Major Boundary Changes
2008	Elias Uddin Mollah	Awami League
2014	Elias Uddin Mollah	Awami League
2018	Elias Uddin Mollah	Awami League
2024	Elias Uddin Mollah	Awami League
2026	Abdul Baten	Bangladesh Jamaat-e-Islami

== Elections ==
=== Elections in the 2020s ===
General election 2026: Dhaka-16
Party	Candidate	Votes	%	±%
Jamaat	Abdul Baten	88,828	48.87	New
BNP	Aminul Haque	85,467	47.02	+25.70
IAB	Md. Saiful Islam	3,679	2.02	N/A
Majority		3,361	1.85	−51.33
Turnout		181,747	45.38	−15.96
Registered electors		400,499		
Jamaat gain from AL				

=== Elections in the 2010s ===
General Election 2018: Dhaka-16
Party	Candidate	Votes	%	±%
AL	Elias Uddin Mollah	1,75,536	76.54	N/A
BNP	Md Ahsan Ullah Hasan	53,537	23.34	N/A
BRWP	Naima Khaled Monika	372	0.16	N/A
Majority		1,21,999	53.18	
Turnout		2,29,445	61.34	
Registered electors		3,74,154		
AL hold				

General Election 2014: Dhaka-16
Party	Candidate	Votes	%	±%
AL	Elias Uddin Mollah	35,855	58.1	−0.9
Independent	Sardar Mohammad Mannan	25,133	40.7	N/A
BNF	Md. Khalid Hossain	728	1.2	N/A
Majority		10,722	17.4	−3.5
Turnout		61,716	18.0	−56.3
AL hold				

=== Elections in the 2000s ===
General Election 2008: Dhaka-16
Party	Candidate	Votes	%	±%
AL	Elias Uddin Mollah	131,816	59.0	N/A
BNP	Rafiqul Islam Miah	85,002	38.0	N/A
IAB	Abdul Mannan Aziz	3,826	1.7	N/A
BTF	Syed Nozibul Boshor Mije Bandari	1,313	0.6	N/A
BDB	Md. Mahfuzur Rahman	750	0.3	N/A
United Citizen Movement	Qazi Faruque Ahmed	450	0.2	N/A
BSD	Mosharraf Hossen Chowdhury	361	0.2	N/A
Majority		46,814	20.9	N/A
Turnout		223,518	74.3	N/A
AL win (new seat)				
