= Shahadat Hossain Salim =

Bangladeshi politician (born 1959)

The Honourable Shahadat Hossain Salim
- শাহাদাত হোসেন সেলিম

Member of Parliament
- Incumbent
- Assumed office 17 February 2026
- Prime Minister: Tarique Rahman
- Constituency: Lakshmipur-1

Personal details
- Born: 31 December 1959 (age 66) Ramganj Upazila, Lakshmipur District
- Party: Bangladesh Nationalist Party

Shahadat Hossain Salim (born 31 December 1959) is a Bangladeshi politician of the Bangladesh Nationalist Party. He is currently serving as a Member of Parliament from Lakshmipur-1.

== Early life ==
Salim was born on 31 December in 1959 at Ramganj Upazila in Lakshmipur District.
