= Mohammad Mohammadullah =

President of Bangladesh from 1973 to 1975

- মোহাম্মদ মোহাম্মদুল্লাহ
- Mohammad Mohammadullah

President of Bangladesh
- In office 24 December 1973 – 25 January 1975
- Prime Minister: Sheikh Mujibur Rahman
- Preceded by: Abu Sayeed Chowdhury
- Succeeded by: Sheikh Mujibur Rahman

2nd & 5th Vice President of Bangladesh
- In office 15 August 1975 – 6 November 1975
- President: Khondaker Mostaq Ahmad
- Preceded by: Syed Nazrul Islam
- Succeeded by: Abdus Sattar
- In office 23 March 1982 – 24 March 1982
- President: Abdus Sattar
- Preceded by: Mirza Nurul Huda
- Succeeded by: A. K. M. Nurul Islam

Speaker of the Jatiya Sangsad
- In office 7 April 1973 – 26 January 1974
- Deputy: Mohammad Baitullah
- Preceded by: Shah Abdul Hamid
- Succeeded by: Abdul Malek Ukil

Deputy Speaker of the Constituent Assembly of Bangladesh
- In office 10 April 1972 – 11 October 1972
- Preceded by: Post established
- Succeeded by: Mohammad Baitullah

Member of Parliament
- In office 5 April 1991 – 24 November 1995
- Preceded by: Chowdhury Khurshid Alam
- Succeeded by: Abul Khair Bhuiyan
- Constituency: Lakshmipur-2
- In office 7 March 1973 – 6 November 1975
- Preceded by: Position Established
- Succeeded by: Mohammad Momin Ullah
- Constituency: Noakhali-9

Personal details
- Born: 21 October 1921 Raipur, Bengal Province, British India (now Lakshmipur, Bangladesh)
- Died: 12 November 1999 (aged 78) Dhaka, Bangladesh
- Party: Awami League (Before 1980; 1996–1999)
- Other political affiliations: Bangladesh Nationalist Party (1980–1996)
- Education: University of Dhaka; Surendranath College

Mohammad Mohammadullah (Note: Bengali: মোহাম্মদ মোহাম্মদুল্লাহ, romanized: Mohammad Mohammadullāh [ˈmoɦɑmmɔd ˈmoɦɑmmɔd̪ulːɑ]) (21 October 1921 – 12 November 1999) was the third president of the People's Republic of Bangladesh. Mohammadullah became the Acting President on 24 December 1973, was elected president on 24 January 1974, and took oath of office on 27 January 1974. He remained President until 25 January 1975.

== Early life and education ==
Mohammadullah was born in Saicha, Raipur, Lakshmipur, on 21 October 1921. His father Munshi Abdul Wahab was a social worker. In 1943, he completed his secondary school certificate from Lakshmipur Adarsha Samad Government High School. Mohammadullah earned a bachelor's degree with honours in history from Dhaka University and obtained LLB degree from Ripon College Kolkata and again from Dhaka University in the same year 1948. In 1950, he became a member of the Dhaka Bar. In 1964, he was enrolled in Dhaka High Court as an advocate.

== Political career ==
Mohammadullah was an active member of the East Pakistan Awami League from 1950. He had walked into the Awami League office in Nawabpur and told Sheikh Mujibur Rahman he would like to volunteer for Awami League and started working in office management. In 1953, he was elected as office secretary of East Pakistan and held the same position till 1972 after being nominated by Sheikh Mujibur Rahman. He actively participated in the six point movement in 1966, for which he was jailed for a long time. Mohammadullah was elected to the East Pakistan Provincial Assembly on the ticket of the Awami League in 1970. He was appointed the political advisor to the Acting President Syed Nazrul Islam during the Bangladesh Liberation War in 1971.

On 10 April 1972, he was elected as the Deputy Speaker of the Bangladesh Constituent Assembly (Ganoparishad) and the same year he became the acting Speaker. On 12 November 1972, he was elected Speaker. He was elected to the Member of the Parliament (JS) from the Raipur-Lakshmipur constituency, and was re-elected Speaker of the House again in 1973.

He became the Acting President of the Republic on 24 December 1973 and President on 24 January 1974. In January 1975, the fourth amendment was passed which removed then President Mohammad Mohammadullah from office and made Bangabandhu Sheikh Mujibur Rahman president for a five-year term.

He was made Minister of Land Administration and Land Reforms in the Cabinet of Sheikh Mujibur Rahman on 26 January 1975. He was appointed the Vice President by collaborators of the Assassination of Sheikh Mujib in August 1975. Mohammadullah joined the Bangladesh Nationalist Party (BNP) in 1980. He was appointed vice president by President Abdus Sattar in March 1982 but the tenure lasted just a day, because General Hussain Muhammad Ershad took over the reins of administration of the country. Mohammadullah was elected a member of the parliament (JS) once again in 1991 on BNP ticket.

== Death ==
Mohammadullah died on 12 November 1999 at the age of 78. He was buried at Banani graveyard near Naval Headquarters.

== Honours ==
- King Jigme Singye Investiture Medal (Kingdom of Bhutan, received: 2 June 1974).

== Notes ==
Political offices
Preceded by Abu Sayeed Chowdhury	President of Bangladesh; 1973–1975	Succeeded by Mujibur Rahman
Preceded by Mirza Nurul Huda	Vice President of Bangladesh; 1982	Succeeded by A K M Nurul Islam
