= Lakshmipur-2 =

Constituency of Bangladesh's Jatiya Sangsad

Coordinates: 22.94°N 91.30°E

- Constituency for the Jatiya Sangsad
- District: Lakshmipur District
- Division: Chittagong Division
- Electorate: 493,970 (2026)

Current constituency
- Created: 1984
- Party: Bangladesh Nationalist Party
- Member: Abul Khair Bhuiyan
- ← 274 Lakshmipur-1 276 Lakshmipur-3 →

Lakshmipur-2 is a constituency represented in the Jatiya Sangsad (National Parliament) of Bangladesh since 2026 by Abul Khair Bhuiyan of the Bangladesh Nationalist Party.

== Boundaries ==
The constituency encompasses Raipur Upazila and nine union parishads of Lakshmipur Sadar Upazila: Basikpur, Char Ramani Mohan, Char Ruhita, Dakshin Hamchadi, Dalal Bazar, Parbati Nagar, Shak Char, Tum Char, and Uttar Hamchadi.

== History ==
The constituency was created in 1984 from a Noakhali constituency when the former Noakhali District was split into three districts: Feni, Noakhali, and Lakshmipur.

== Members of Parliament ==
Election	Member	Party
1986	Chowdhury Khurshid Alam	Jatiya Party
1991	Mohammad Mohammadullah	Bangladesh Nationalist Party
Feb 1996	Abul Khair Bhuiyan	Bangladesh Nationalist Party
Sep 1996 by-election	Harunur Rashid	Awami League
Nov 2001 by-election	Abul Khair Bhuiyan	Bangladesh Nationalist Party
2014	Mohammad Noman	Jatiya Party (Ershad)
2018	Mohammad Shahid Islam	Independent
Jun 2021 by-election	Nuruddin Chowdhury Noyon	Awami League
2026	Abul Khair Bhuiyan	Bangladesh Nationalist Party

== Elections ==
=== Elections in the 2020s ===
General Election 2026: Lakshmipur-2
Party	Candidate	Votes	%	±%
BNP	Abul Khair Bhuiyan	164,321	53.4	N/A
Jamaat	S. U. M Ruhul Amin Bhuiyan	133,698	43.5	N/A
IAB	Helal Uddin	6,774	2.2	N/A
BSP	Md. Ibrahim Mia	1,780	0.6	N/A
GOP	Abul Bashar	424	0.1	N/A
Bangladesh Kalyan Party	Md. Farhad Mia	288	0.1	N/A
Nagorik Oikko	Mohammad Rezaul Karim	253	0.1	N/A
Majority		30,623	10.0	N/A
Turnout		307,538	62.3	N/A
BNP gain from AL				

=== Elections in the 2010s ===
Mohammad Noman was elected unopposed in the 2014 general election after opposition parties withdrew their candidacies in a boycott of the election.

=== Elections in the 2000s ===
General Election 2008: Lakshmipur-2
Party	Candidate	Votes	%	±%
BNP	Abul Khair Bhuiyan	129,995	57.1	−15.1
AL	Harunur Rashid	51,732	39.6	+13.3
Independent	Mohammad Ali Khokon	37,717	1.3	N/A
IAB	Shajahan Patowary	1,813	1.2	N/A
BDB	Shah Ahmed Badal	672	0.1	N/A
BKA	Altaf Hossain Molla	620	0.1	N/A
National People's Party	AHM Zaheer Hossain Hakim	256	0.6	N/A
Majority		78,263	17.5	−28.4
Turnout		222,815	83.7	+21.0
BNP hold				

Khaleda Zia stood for five seats in the 2001 general election: Bogra-6, Bogra-7, Feni-1, Khulna-2 and Lakshmipur-2. After winning all five, she chose to represent Bogra-6 and quit the other four, triggering by-elections in them. Abul Khair Bhuiyan of the BNP was elected unopposed in the by-election scheduled for 12 November.

General Election 2001: Lakshmipur-2
Party	Candidate	Votes	%	±%
BNP	Begum Khaleda Zia	123,526	72.2	+20.6
AL	Harunur Rashid	44,974	26.3	+2.7
IJOF	Abul Kashem Choyal	1,251	0.7	N/A
Gano Forum	Ruhul Amin Patwari	438	0.3	+0.1
Independent	Md. Jasim Uddin	175	0.1	N/A
JSD	Rafiqul Haider Chowdhury	165	0.1	N/A
Independent	Md. Ruhul Amin	159	0.1	N/A
Independent	Md. Shahid Ulla	141	0.1	N/A
Jatiya Party (M)	Kazi Jamsed Kabir Bakki Billah	126	0.1	N/A
Independent	AHM Zaheer Hossain Hakim	55	0.0	N/A
Majority		78,552	45.9	
Turnout		171,010	62.7	
BNP hold				

=== Elections in the 1990s ===
Khaleda Zia stood for five seats in the June 1996 general election: Bogra-6, Bogra-7, Feni-1, Lakshmipur-2 and Chittagong-1. After winning all five, she chose to represent Feni-1 and quit the other four, triggering by-elections in them. Harunur Rashid of the Awami League was elected in a September 1996 by-election.

General Election June 1996: Lakshmipur-2
Party	Candidate	Votes	%	±%
BNP	Begum Khaleda Zia	59,054	51.6	−1.9
AL	Tozmmel Hossain Chowdhury	26,937	23.6	−9.6
Jamaat	M. A. Jabbar	19,677	17.2	+12.9
JP(E)	Chowdhury Khurshid Alam	6,294	5.5	N/A
IOJ	Sams Uddin	1,289	1.1	N/A
Zaker Party	Gazi Amin Ullah	322	0.3	−0.3
Gano Forum	Ruhul Amin Patwari	240	0.2	N/A
Pragotishi Jatiatabadi Dal (Nurul A Moula)	Md. Mamunur Rashid	195	0.2	N/A
Jatiya Samajtantrik Dal-JSD	Md. Rafiqul Haider	191	0.2	−3.8
FP	Aziz Ullah Bhuiyan	128	0.1	N/A
Majority		32,117	28.1	+7.8
Turnout		114,327	62.2	+32.8
BNP hold				

General Election 1991: Lakshmipur-2
Party	Candidate	Votes	%	±%
BNP	Mohammad Mohammadullah	38,599	53.5	
AL	Khaled Md. Ali	23,929	33.2	
Jamaat	M. A. Jabbar	3,097	4.3	
Jatiya Samajtantrik Dal-JSD	Rafiqul Haider Chowdhury	2,862	4.0	
WPB	Abul Bashar	2,784	3.9	
Zaker Party	Main Uddin	459	0.6	
Independent	Md. Dhanu Miah	235	0.3	
JSD (S)	Humayun Kabir	111	0.2	
NAP (Muzaffar)	Md. Nurul Islam Chowdhury	77	0.1	
Majority		14.670	20.3	
Turnout		72,147	29.4	
BNP gain from JP(E)				
