= Rahmat Khali Canal =

River of Lakshmipur District, Bangladesh

Rahmat Khali Canal Rahmatkhali Nodi
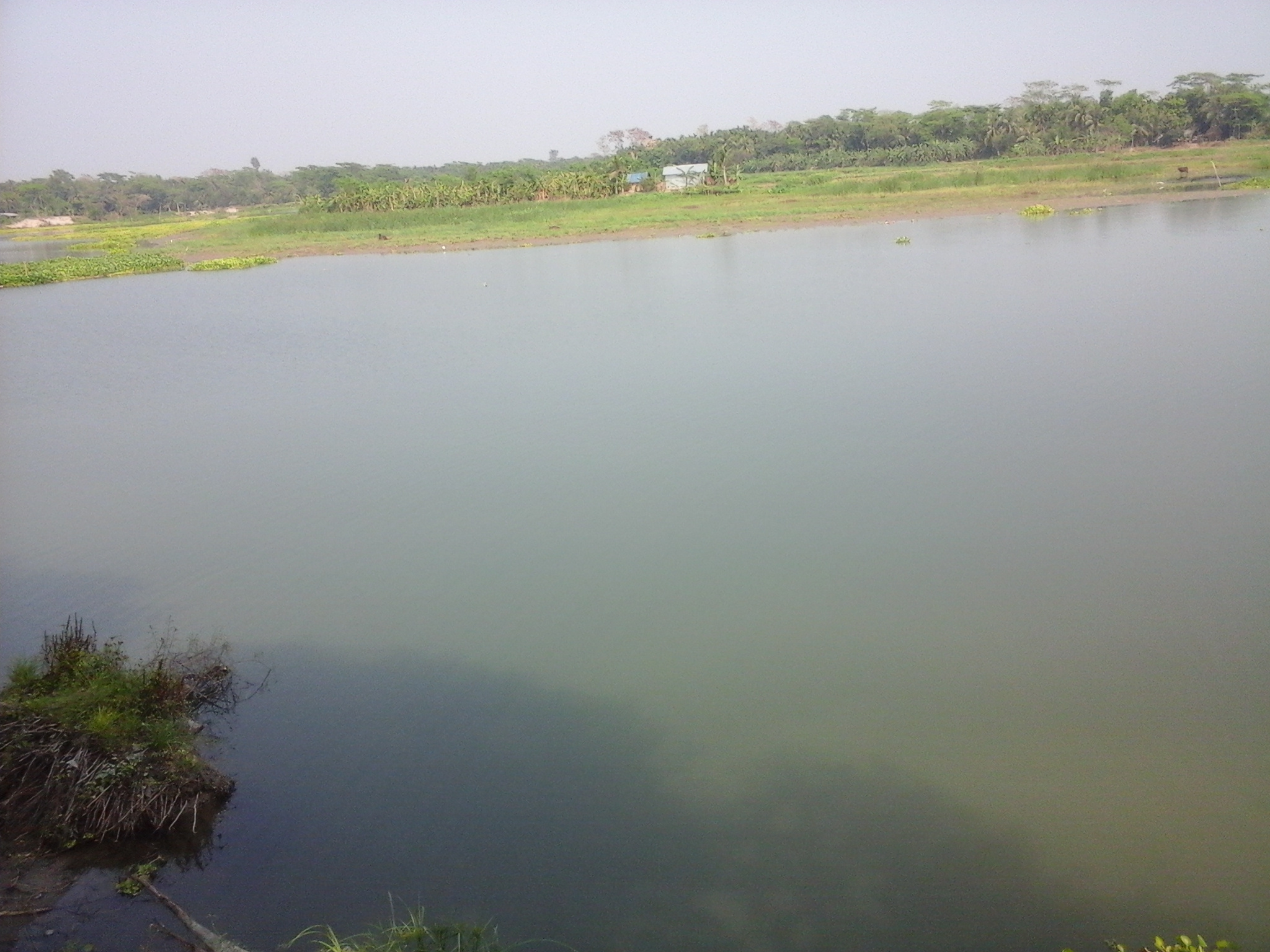
- Photographed at Moju Chowdhury Hat mouth of Meghna River
- Native name: রহমত খালি খাল (Bengali)

Location
- Country: Bangladesh
- Region: Chittagong Division
- District: Lakshmipur District
- City: Lakshmipur

Physical characteristics
- Mouth: Meghna River
  - location: Lakshmipur District, Chittagong Division, Bangladesh

Rahmat Khali Canal (Bengali: রহমত খালি খাল), or Rahmatkhali river, is a canal that flows through Lakshmipur Sadar Upazila in Chittagong Division, Bangladesh.

== Course ==
The canal flows through Lakshmipur District and empties into the Meghna River at 22.8659°N 90.7606°E, just below Moju Chowdhury Hat.

== See also ==
- List of rivers in Bangladesh
