= Mohammad Ullah (Lakshmipur politician) =

Bangladeshi politician (1950–2023)

Member of Bangladesh Parliament
- In office 1986–1988

Personal details
- Born: 1950 Lakshmipur District, Chittagong Division, East Bengal, Pakistan
- Died: 23 August 2023 (aged 73) Lakshmipur District, Chattogram Division, Bangladeah
- Party: Jatiya Party (Ershad)

Mohammad Ullah (Bengali: মোহাম্মদ উল্লাহ; 1950 – 23 August 2023) was a Jatiya Party (Ershad) politician and a member of parliament for Laxmipur-3.

== Career ==
From 1977 to 1981, Ullah was the mayor of Lakshmipur municipality.

Ullah was elected to parliament from Laxmipur-3 as a Jatiya Party candidate in 1986.

== Death ==
Ullah was killed on 23 August 2023 after a motorbike crashed into him in Lakshmipur Sadar Upazila. He was 73.
