= Keroa Union =

Rural Council in Bangladesh

Keroa Union (Bengali: কেরোয়া ইউনিয়ন) is a union parishad under Raipur Upazila of Lakshmipur District in the Chittagong Division of eastern Bangladesh. It has ten wards and covers an area of 4,140 acres (17 km^{2}). There are four villages in the union: Enayetpur, Keroa, Lamchari, and Ludhua.

== Demographics ==
In the 2011 census, the union had a population of 30,668. The overall literacy rate was 65.5%, with the male literacy rate at 64.7% and the female at 66.1%. Keroa Union is predominately Muslim, with only 2.4% Hindu.

== Infrastructure ==
Infrastructure in Keroa is better than much of Bangladesh, although most roads remain unpaved. People usually use rickshaws and CNG autorickshaws for local transport. Most houses have electric connections, but load shedding remains as a big problem. Some homes are using renewable energy such as solar panels.

Drinking water comes predominantly from village tubes or wells. Only 34% of homes in Keroa have water-sealed sanitary toilets and 15% remain without toilets; however, this is better than the national figure, as only 23% of homes in Bangladesh have water-sealed sanitary toilets while 43% remain without toilets.

== Employment ==
Most people work in agriculture, but the densely populated union suffers from a lack of arable land and as a result the people have to buy most of their food from the market. There are four local markets: Sunamgonj Bazar, Ludua Bazar, Noarhat/Mollar Hat, and Peer Fojlullah Bazar. A large number of locals are expatriates, mostly from the Middle East and other parts of Bangladesh.
