= Raipur Fish Hatchery and Training Centre =

Fish hatchery in Bangladesh

Coordinates: 23.0263°N 90.7687°E

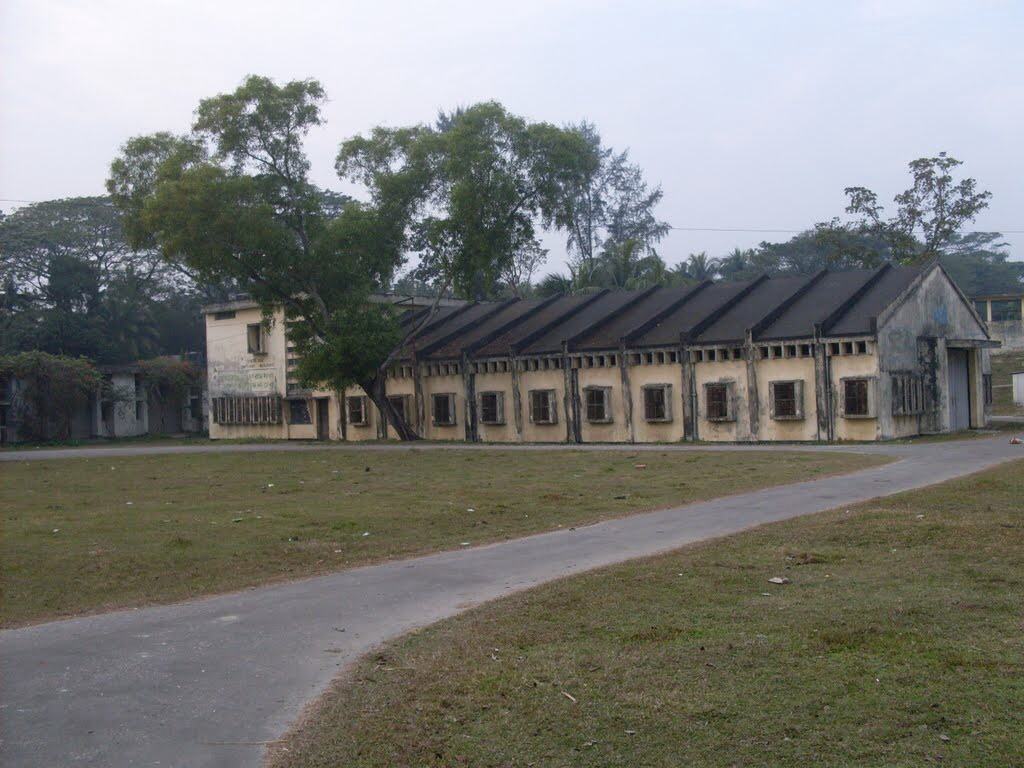
Front of the hatchery

Raipur Fish Hatchery and Training Centre is a fish hatchery in Raipur Upazila, Lakshmipur District, Bangladesh. One of the six main fish hatcheries in Bangladesh, it was the largest hatchery in the district during the Noakhali Rural Development Project implemented during 1978–1992 by DANIDA, a Danish development agency. One of the three principal scientific officers (PSOs) of the Department of Fisheries is assigned to Raipur Hatchery. It also is one of three training centers directly governed by the director general of the department, along with Fisheries Training Institute (Chandpur) and Fisheries Training Academy in (Dhaka).

Raipur Upazila has 8 fish farms, 14 dairy farms, 72 poultry farms and this one hatchery. As of 2004, the government-owned hatchery was able to produce 504 kilograms of hatchlings a year, which mostly consisted of endemic species like Catla catla (katla), Labeo rohita (rui), Cirrhinus cirrhosus (mrigal), Labeo calbasu (kalabaus), Clarias batrachus (magur), and Channa striata (shingi).

== History ==
In 1979, mirror carps (Cyprinus carpio var. specularis) from Nepal were first introduced to Bangladesh for the World Bank financed Raipur Fish Hatchery. In 1982, the Raipur Hatchery started artificial spawning in Bangladesh. In 2001, the Greater Noakhali Aquaculture Extension Component (GNAEC), a sub-program of DANIDA's Agricultural Sector Program in Bangladesh, shifted from the hatchery development strategy of hatched at the Raipur Hatchery. GNAEC abandoned "backyard hatcheries" and "village type prawn hatcheries" models for large-scale private sector development
