= Mohammad Noman =

Mohammad Noman may refer to:

- Mohammad Noman (politician)
- Mohammad Noman (educationist)
- Mohammed Noman, Pakistani Guantanamo Bay detainee
