= Charshahi Union =

Charshahi Union চরশাহী ইউনিয়ন
- Union
- Location of Charshahi Union in Bangladesh
- Coordinates: 22°54′26.9″N 90°57′50.5″E
- Country: Bangladesh
- Division: Chattogram Division
- District: Lakshmipur
- Upazila: Lakshmipur Sadar Upazila

Government
  - Type: Union Council
  - Administrator: Md Kamrul Hasan

Area
  - Total: 18.80 km^{2} (7.26 sq mi)
- Time zone: UTC+6 (BST)
- Website: charshahiup.lakshmipur.gov.bd

Charshahi Union (Bengali: চরশাহী ইউনিয়ন) is a Union Parishad of Lakshmipur Sadar Upazila of Lakshmipur, Bangladesh. It has an area of 18.80 km^{2} (7.26 sq mi) and a population of 46873. There are 13 villages in Charshahi union: Nurullapur, Charshahi, Choto Bollovpur, East Jafarpur, Rahimpur, East Sahapur, Titarkandi, East Sayedpur, Rampur, Itkhola, Jaliyakandi, Gobindhapur, Jogannathpur.
