= Raipur L. M. Pilot High School =

- রায়পুর এল.এম. পাইলট হাই স্কুল

Location
- Raipur Upazila, Lakshmipur District; Bangladesh
- Coordinates: 23.0434°N 90.7723°E

Information
- Established: 1911
- Founder: Serajul Haque Chowdhury
- Language: Bengali and English

Raipur L. M. Pilot High School (Bengali: রায়পুর এল.এম. পাইলট হাই স্কুল) is a secondary school situated in Raipur Upazila of Lakshmipur District, Bangladesh. Founded by local landlord Mr. Serajul Haque Chowdhury, alias Shahjada Mia, on 1 January 1911, it is one of the oldest educational institutions in the country. The school was developed as a pilot school by the government, and recently it was selected as a model school of the country. The school celebrated its 100th year in 2011. The school building is a traditional British architecture.

== History ==
The maiden name of the school was George Cornwallis High English School. After the death of Shahjada Mia at his early age, his grandfather Mr. Emdad Ali Chowdhury took responsibility to govern the school. Later deceased landlord, Mr. Emdad Ali Chowdhury's son Alhaj Gajonfar Ali Chowdhury alias Chunu Miah acted as the key person of the school management committee for a long time. During his tenure the school was renamed as Raipur Liaqat Memorial Multilateral High School (Raipur L M M High School), after the name of his nephew Barrister Liaqat Ali Chowdhury, who died at an early age in London, England.

== Academics ==
The school educates from the primary school level up to the high school level, or Class-X.
