= Shahid Uddin Chowdhury Anee =

Bangladeshi politician

- শহীদ উদ্দিন চৌধুরী এ্যানি
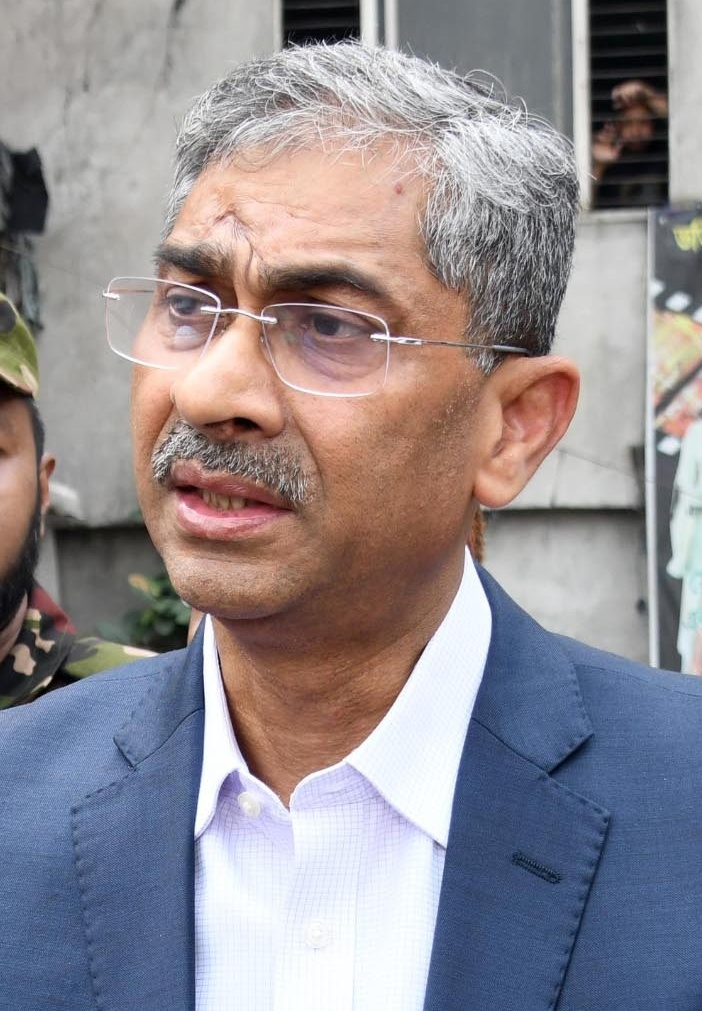
- Anee in 2026

Minister of Water Resources
- Incumbent
- Assumed office 17 February 2026
- Prime Minister: Tarique Rahman
- Preceded by: Syeda Rizwana Hasan

Member of Parliament
- Incumbent
- Assumed office 17 February 2026
- Preceded by: Golam Faruque Pinku
- Constituency: Lakshmipur-3
- In office 28 October 2001 – 24 January 2014
- Preceded by: Khairul Enam
- Succeeded by: A.K.M. Shahjahan Kamal
- Constituency: Lakshmipur-3

Personal details
- Born: 2 February 1968 (age 58) Lakshmipur Sadar, East Pakistan
- Party: Bangladesh Nationalist Party
- Education: University of Dhaka
- Occupation: Politician

Md. Shahid Uddin Chowdhury Anee (Bengali: মোঃ শহীদ উদ্দিন চৌধুরী এনি; born 2 February 1968) is a Bangladeshi politician of the Bangladesh Nationalist Party. He is a member of the Jatiya Sangsad, representing the Lakshmipur-3 constituency, and currently serves as the Minister of Water Resources.

== Career ==
Anee was elected to parliament from Laxmipur-3 as a Bangladesh Nationalist Party candidate in 2001 and 2008. He is the Publicity Affairs Secretary of the party. His 2018 election campaign was attacked by Bangladesh Jubo League and Bangladesh Chhatra League members.

In August 2008, Anee was jailed after he had surrendered on charges for extorting Tk 25 lakh from a construction firm in 2005.

In October 2014, Anti-Corruption Commission filed charges against Anee for amassing illegal wealth worth Tk 1.4 core and concealing information about Tk 13.14 lakh.

In January 2016, Anee was sent to jail after two Dhaka courts denied him bail in nine violence cases.

In January 2019, Anee got a bail in a case filed over a clash during the national elections campaign.

In February 2026, Anee won the 13th Bangladeshi general election contesting at the Lakshmipur-3 constituency securing 135,612 votes while his nearest opponent Bangladesh Jamaat-e-Islami candidate Md Rezaul Karim received 122,802 votes.
