= Khairul Enam =

Bangladesh Nationalist Party politician

Advocate Khairul Enam

Lakshmipur-3 constituency Member of Parliament
- In office 27 February 1991 – 15 February 1996
- Preceded by: Abduch Sattar Master
- Succeeded by: Nurul Amin Bhuiyan
- In office 12 June 1996 – 1 October 2001
- Preceded by: Nurul Amin Bhuiyan
- Succeeded by: Shahiduddin Chowdhury Annie

Personal details
- Born: Lakshmipur
- Party: Bangladesh Nationalist Party

Khairul Enam is a politician, lawyer and former member of parliament for the Laxmipur-3 constituency in Laxmipur district of Bangladesh.

== Early life ==
Enam was born in Laxmipur district.

== Career ==
Enam was elected as a member of parliament for Laxmipur-3 constituency as a candidate of Bangladesh Nationalist Party in the 5th Parliamentary Election of 1991. He was also elected as a member of parliament from Laxmipur-3 constituency as a candidate of Bangladesh Nationalist Party in the 7th Parliamentary Election of 12 June 1996.
