= Asharkota =

Place in Chittagong Division, Bangladesh

Asharkotaআশা
- Location in Bangladesh
- Coordinates: 23°23′50″N 90°50′05″E
- Country: Bangladesh
- Division: Chittagong Division
- District: Lakshmipur District
- Upazila: Ramganj Upazila
- Union: Noagaon Union
- Elevation: 33 ft (10 m)
- Time zone: UTC+6 (Bangladesh Time)

Asharkota or Asharkata (Bengali: আশারকোটা) is a village in Ramganj Upazila, Lakshmipur District in the Chittagong Division of eastern Bangladesh, just northwest of Palakhal and north of Singua, 40.6 kilometres (25.2 mi) by road north of Ramganj. The land is very low lying, at 10 metres (33 ft) above sea level.
