= Ziaul Haque Zia =

Bangladeshi politician

- জিয়াউল হক জিয়া

State Minister for Local Government, Rural Development and Co-operatives
- In office 10 October 2001 – 28 October 2006
- Succeeded by: Jahangir Kabir Nanak

Member of Parliament for Laxmipur-1
- In office 20 March 1991 – 27 October 2006
- Preceded by: M. A. Gofran
- Succeeded by: Nazim Uddin Ahmed

Personal details
- Born: 11 March 1953 Keturi, Noakhali District, Bengal Presidency
- Died: 4 November 2016 (aged 63) Bumrungrad International Hospital, Bangkok, Thailand
- Party: Bangladesh Nationalist Party

Ziaul Haque Zia (Bengali: জ়িয়াউল হ়ক় জ়িয়া; 11 March 1953 – 4 November 2016) was a Bangladesh Nationalist Party politician. He was a 4-term Jatiya Sangsad member representing the Lakshmipur-1 constituency. He served as the minister of local government, rural development and co-operatives between 2001 and 2006.

== Early life ==
Zia was born on 11 March 1953, into a Bengali Muslim family in the village of Keturi in Bhadur Union, Ramganj, Noakhali District, Bengal Presidency (now in Lakshmipur District, Bangladesh).

== Career ==
Zia started working in Rupali Bank. He joined the Bangladesh Nationalist Party in 1986. In 2008, a special court convicted Zia of amassing wealth illegally and concealing information from the Anti-Corruption Commission. In 2009, a High Court bench granted bail to eight convicts including Zia. He was the owner of Royal Filling Station, situated in Dhaka's Mohakhali area. The caretaker government confiscated the station in 2007 but it was later returned to Zia.

== Personal life ==
Zia was married to Nasima Haque, with whom he had a son, Mashfiqul Haque Joy, and a daughter, Priyanka Haque

== Death ==
Zia died on 4 November 2016 while receiving treatment for cancer at Bumrungrad International Hospital in Bangkok, Thailand.
