= Lakshmipur-3 =

Constituency of Bangladesh's Jatiya Sangsad

Coordinates: 22.9422°N 90.8467°E

- Constituency for the Jatiya Sangsad
- District: Lakshmipur District
- Division: Chittagong Division
- Electorate: 444,472 (2026)

Current constituency
- Created: 1984
- Party: Bangladesh Nationalist Party
- Member: Shahid Uddin Chowdhury Anee
- ← 275 Lakshmipur-2 277 Lakshmipur-4 →

Lakshmipur-3 is a constituency represented in the Jatiya Sangsad (National Parliament) of Bangladesh since 2026 by Shahid Uddin Chowdhury Anee of the Bangladesh Nationalist Party.

== Boundaries ==
The constituency encompasses Lakshmipur Sadar Upazila except for nine union parishads: Basikpur, Char Ramani Mohan, Char Ruhita, Dakshin Hamchadi, Dalal Bazar, Parbati Nagar, Shak Char, Tum Char, and Uttar Hamchadi.

== History ==
The constituency was created in 1984 from a Noakhali constituency when the former Noakhali District was split into three districts: Feni, Noakhali, and Lakshmipur.

== Members of Parliament ==
Election	Member	Party
1986	Mohammad Ullah	Jatiya Party
1988	Abdus Sattar	Combined opposition
1991	Khairul Enam	Bangladesh Nationalist Party
Feb 1996	Nurul Amin Bhuiyan	Bangladesh Nationalist Party
Jun 1996	Khairul Enam	Bangladesh Nationalist Party
2001	Shahiduddin Chowdhury Annie	Bangladesh Nationalist Party
2008	Shahiduddin Chowdhury Annie	Bangladesh Nationalist Party
2014	A. K. M. Shahjahan Kamal	Awami League
2023 - by election	Mohammed Golam Faroque	Awami League
2026	Shahiduddin Chowdhury Annie	Bangladesh Nationalist Party

== Elections ==
=== Elections in the 2020s ===
General Election 2026: Lakshmipur-3
Party	Candidate	Votes	%	±%
BNP	Shahiduddin Chowdhury Annie	135,612	51.1	N/A
Jamaat	Md. Rezaul Karim	122,802	46.2	N/A
IAB	Md. Ibrahim	5,051	1.9	N/A
JP(E)	A. K. M. Mohi Uddin	1,399	0.5	N/A
LDP	Md. Shamsuddin	488	0.2	N/A
NPP	Salim Mahmud	289	0.1	N/A
Majority		12,810	4.8	N/A
Turnout		265,641	59.8	N/A
BNP gain from AL				

After the death of the previous MP of this constituency A. K. M. Shahjahan Kamal, new by-elections were taken on 5 November 2023. However, the Bangladesh Election Commission has decided to cancel the results of the election after a video went viral online of a former Bangladesh Chhatra League leader (Awami League's student wing) is seen stamping the "boat" symbol of Awami League in 43 ballot papers in 57 seconds.

2023 by-election: Lakshmipur-3
Party	Candidate	Votes	%	±%
AL	Mohammed Golam Faroque	120,599	96.9%	
JP(E)	Mohammad Rakib Hossain	3,846	3.2%	
AL hold				

=== Elections in the 2010s ===
General Election 2018: Lakshmipur-3
Party	Candidate	Votes	%	±%
AL	A. K. M. Shahjahan Kamal	2,33,728	70.6	N/A
BNP	Shahiduddin Chowdhury Annie	14,492	4.4	N/A
AL hold				

A. K. M. Shahjahan Kamal was elected unopposed in the 2014 general election after opposition parties withdrew their candidacies in a boycott of the election.

=== Elections in the 2000s ===
General Election 2008: Lakshmipur-3
Party	Candidate	Votes	%	±%
BNP	Shahiduddin Chowdhury Annie	109,631	56.7	−11.3
AL	Md. Abul Hashem	82,050	42.4	+12.9
IAB	Md. Mahfuzur Rahman Amini	1,108	0.6	N/A
LDP	Md. Samshuddin	734	0.4	N/A
Majority		27,581	14.3	−24.3
Turnout		193,523	82.5	+19.7
BNP hold				

General Election 2001: Lakshmipur-3
Party	Candidate	Votes	%	±%
BNP	Shahiduddin Chowdhury Annie	95,215	68.0	+24.3
AL	Kazi Md. Iqbal Hossain	41,235	29.5	+0.7
IJOF	Md. Noman	3,537	2.5	N/A
Majority		53,980	38.6	+23.7
Turnout		139,987	62.8	−3.4
BNP hold				

=== Elections in the 1990s ===
General Election June 1996: Lakshmipur-3
Party	Candidate	Votes	%	±%
BNP	Khairul Enam	42,232	43.7	+12.1
AL	A. K. M. Shahjahan Kamal	27,787	28.8	+6.5
Jamaat	Md. Safiq Ullah	16,124	16.7	−5.8
JP(E)	Mohammad Ullah	8,226	8.5	+0.2
Gano Forum	A. Q. M. Shafiq Ullah	898	0.9	N/A
Zaker Party	M. Fayez Ahmed	294	0.3	−0.5
Jatiya Samajtantrik Dal (Khalequzzaman)	Md. Siddique Ullah Kabir	277	0.3	N/A
Pragotishi Jatiatabadi Dal (Nurul A Moula)	Md. Mamunur Rashid	271	0.3	N/A
BKA	Abdul Kader	269	0.3	N/A
Jatiya Samajtantrik Dal (Marxist-Leninist)	Nurul Islam Mian	170	0.2	−2.9
Jatiya Janata Party (Sheikh Asad)	Mir Md. Abul Kalam Azad	41	0.0	N/A
Bangladesh Janata Party	Md. Sirajul Islam	40	0.0	N/A
Majority		14,445	14.9	+5.8
Turnout		96,629	66.2	+27.9
BNP hold				

General Election 1991: Lakshmipur-3
Party	Candidate	Votes	%	±%
BNP	Khairul Enam	26,908	31.6	
Jamaat	Md. Shafiq Ullah	19,132	22.5	
AL	A K M Shahjahan Kamal	18,993	22.3	
JSD (Rab)	Md. Abdul Matin	7,461	8.8	
JP(E)	Mohammad Ullah	7,019	8.3	
Jatiya Samajtantrik Dal (Marxist-Leninist)	Tyab Chowdhury	2,642	3.1	
Independent	Shamsuddin Manik	1,783	2.1	
Zaker Party	Abul Kalam	651	0.8	
Independent	Md. Rustam Company	195	0.2	
FP	Abdus Sattar	124	0.1	
Bangladesh National Awami Party (Bhashani)	Joinal Abedin Mollah	114	0.1	
Majority		7,776	9.1	
Turnout		85,022	38.3	
BNP gain from				
