= Nurul Amin Bhuiyan =

Bangladeshi politician

Member of Bangladesh Parliament
- In office February 1996 – June 2001
- Preceded by: Khairul Enam
- Succeeded by: Khairul Enam

Personal details
- Party: Bangladesh Nationalist Party

Nurul Amin Bhuiyan is a Bangladesh Nationalist Party politician and a former member of parliament from Laxmipur-3.

== Career ==
Bhuiyan was elected to parliament from Laxmipur-3 as a Bangladesh Nationalist Party candidate in February 1996.
