= S. I. M. Nurunnabi Khan =

Bangladeshi writer and freedom fighter (1942–2019)

Nurunnabi Khan
- এস আই এম নূরুন্নবী খাঁন
- Born: 12 February 1942; Ramganj, Bengal, British India
- Died: 22 May 2019 (aged 77); Chittagong, Bangladesh
- Military career
- Allegiance: Pakistan (Before 1971); Bangladesh
- Branch: Pakistan Army; Bangladesh Army
- Service years: 1970 - 1981
- Rank: Lieutenant Colonel
- Unit: Corps of Electrical Mechanical Engineers
- Commands: Company Commander of Sector - IV; Commandant of 902nd Central EME Workshop; Commandant of EME Center and School
- Conflicts: Bangladesh Liberation War
- Awards: Bir Bikrom

Shamsul Islam Muhammad Nurunnabi Khan (Bengali: শামসুল ইসলাম মোহাম্মদ নূরুন্নবী খাঁন; 1942 – 22 May 2019) was a Bangladeshi freedom fighter and writer. He was awarded Bir Bikrom for his contribution to the Liberation War of Bangladesh.

== Early life and education ==
Nurunnabi Khan was born in 1942 into a Bengali Muslim family in the village of Lakshmidharpara, Ramganj, Noakhali District, Bengal Presidency (now in Lakshmipur District, Bangladesh). He was the eldest child of Habibullah Khan and Shamsunnahar Begum.

Khan completed his graduation from East Pakistan University of Engineering and Technology (now Bangladesh University of Engineering and Technology) in electrical and electronics engineering. He was the president of the East Pakistan University of Engineering and Technology Student League in 1967 and 1968. Later, he became vice president of his university's student union in 1969. He took part in the 1969 Mass Uprising.

== Career ==
After completing graduation, Nurunnabi Khan joined the Pakistan Army. He was in the Quetta School of Infantry and Tactics in 1971. After the declaration of independence of Bangladesh, he decided to take part in the Liberation War of Bangladesh. He came to Dhaka on 27 March 1971 to take part in the Liberation War of Bangladesh. He was appointed the captain of Delta Company in the Liberation War of Bangladesh.

Nurunnabi Khan took part in battles across the country. He took part in the battlefield of Bahadurabad, Chhatak, Gowainghat, Radhanagar, Chhotokhel, Salutikor, and other places. After independence he was awarded Bir Bikrom for his contribution to the Bangladesh Liberation War in 1971.

Nurunnabi Khan joined the Bangladesh Army after the Liberation of Bangladesh. He studied at the Royal Military College of Science from 1973 to 1976 and achieved a degree in atomic engineering. He was suspended from the Bangladesh Army in 1981 for an allegation of his involvement in an unsuccessful coup.

Nurunnabi Khan also wrote books about the Liberation of Bangladesh. His twelve books were published. He wrote books like Jiboner Juddho Juddher Jibon, Roumari Ronangon, Operation Bahadurabad, and Operation Salutikor. He also established Columbia Prakashani for publishing books about the Liberation War of Bangladesh.

== Death ==
Nurunnabi Khan died on 22 May 2019 at the age of 77.
