= Lakshmipur-1 =

Bangladeshi parliamentary constituency

Coordinates: 23.09°N 90.86°E

- Constituency for the Jatiya Sangsad
- District: Lakshmipur District
- Division: Chittagong Division
- Electorate: 281,302 (2026)

Current constituency
- Created: 1984
- Party: Bangladesh Nationalist Party
- Member: Shahadat Hossain Salim
- ← 273 Noakhali-6 275 Lakshmipur-2 →

Lakshmipur-1 is a constituency represented in the Jatiya Sangsad (National Parliament) of Bangladesh since 2026 by Shahadat Hossain Salim of the Bangladesh Nationalist Party.

== Boundaries ==
The constituency encompasses Ramganj Upazila.

== History ==
The constituency was created in 1984 from a Noakhali constituency when the former Noakhali District was split into three districts: Feni, Noakhali, and Lakshmipur.

== Members of Parliament ==
| Election | Member | Party |
|---|---|---|
| 1986 | A. N. M. Shamsul Islam | Jatiya Party |
| 1988 | M. A. Gofran | |
| 1991 | Ziaul Haque Zia | Bangladesh Nationalist Party |
| Feb 1996 | Nazim Uddin Ahmed | Bangladesh Nationalist Party |
| Jun 1996 | Ziaul Haque Zia | Bangladesh Nationalist Party |
| 2008 | Nazim Uddin Ahmed | Bangladesh Nationalist Party |
| 2014 | M. A. Awal | Tarikat Federation |
| 2018 | Anwar Hossain Khan | Awami League |
| 2026 | Shahadat Hossain Salim | Bangladesh Nationalist Party |

== Elections ==
=== Elections in the 2020s ===
General Election 2026: Lakshmipur-1
| Party | Candidate | Votes | % | ±% |
|---|---|---|---|---|
| BNP | Shahadat Hossain Salim | 86,811 | 54.9 | N/A |
| NCP | Md. Mahbub Alam | 59,265 | 37.5 | N/A |
| IAB | Md. Zakir Hossain Patwari | 11,156 | 7.1 | N/A |
| JP(E) | Mahmudur Rahman Mahmud | 414 | 0.3 | N/A |
| BSD | Md. Billal Hossain | 203 | 0.1 | N/A |
| NDM | Md. Alamgir Hossain | 106 | 0.1 | N/A |
| GOP | Md. Kausar Alam | 106 | 0.1 | N/A |
| Majority | | 27,546 | 17.4 | N/A |
| Turnout | | 158,061 | 56.2 | N/A |
| BNP gain from AL | | | | |

=== Elections in the 2010s ===
General Election 2014: Lakshmipur-1
| Party | Candidate | Votes | % | ±% |
|---|---|---|---|---|
| BTF | M. A. Awal | 49,656 | 67.3 | +67.1 |
| Independent | Shafiqul Islam | 21,859 | 29.6 | N/A |
| JP(E) | Mahmudur Rahman Mahmud | 2,286 | 3.1 | N/A |
| Majority | | 27,797 | 37.7 | +23.1 |
| Turnout | | 73,801 | 39.8 | −41.9 |
| BTF gain from BNP | | | | |

=== Elections in the 2000s ===
General Election 2008: Lakshmipur-1
| Party | Candidate | Votes | % | ±% |
|---|---|---|---|---|
| BNP | Nazim Uddin Ahmed | 74,276 | 56.2 | −9.7 |
| AL | Shahjahan | 54,946 | 41.6 | +10.6 |
| IAB | Md. Abdul Kabir | 1,850 | 1.4 | N/A |
| National People's Party | Mosaraf Hossain | 324 | 0.2 | N/A |
| BTF | Md. Aminul Haque Tipu | 317 | 0.2 | N/A |
| KSJL | Md. Amin Ullah | 252 | 0.2 | N/A |
| Jatiya Samajtantrik Dal-JSD | Abu Sayed Mohon | 240 | 0.2 | N/A |
| Majority | | 19,330 | 14.6 | −20.3 |
| Turnout | | 132,205 | 81.7 | +15.3 |
| BNP hold | | | | |

General Election 2001: Lakshmipur-1
| Party | Candidate | Votes | % | ±% |
|---|---|---|---|---|
| BNP | Ziaul Haque Zia | 68,990 | 65.9 | +22.0 |
| AL | Shahjahan | 32,437 | 31.0 | +4.5 |
| IJOF | Mahmudur Rahman Mahmud | 2,572 | 2.5 | N/A |
| Bangladesh Samajtantrik Dal (Basad-Khalekuzzaman) | Abdur Razzak | 226 | 0.2 | N/A |
| Independent | Md. Mahmudul Haq | 187 | 0.2 | N/A |
| JSD | Abu Sayed Mohon | 160 | 0.2 | N/A |
| WPB | Md. Nazrul Islam | 93 | 0.1 | N/A |
| Majority | | 36,553 | 34.9 | +17.5 |
| Turnout | | 104,665 | 66.4 | +7.0 |
| BNP hold | | | | |

=== Elections in the 1990s ===
General Election June 1996: Lakshmipur-1
| Party | Candidate | Votes | % | ±% |
|---|---|---|---|---|
| BNP | Ziaul Haque Zia | 28,577 | 43.9 | +3.3 |
| AL | Safiqul Islam | 17,244 | 26.5 | +16.0 |
| JP(E) | Monir Ahmed | 9,345 | 14.4 | +1.7 |
| Jamaat | Lutfor Rahman | 8,843 | 13.6 | −4.9 |
| Sramajibi Oikkya Forum | Md. Sirajul Islam | 229 | 0.4 | N/A |
| Bangladesh Samajtantrik Samsad (Darshan Shava) | Md. Momin Ullah | 209 | 0.3 | N/A |
| Jatiya Samajtantrik Dal-JSD | Md. Samsuddin | 190 | 0.3 | N/A |
| Bangladesh Samajtantrik Dal (Khalekuzzaman) | Abdur Razzak | 177 | 0.3 | N/A |
| Independent | Golam Sarwar Mazumder | 175 | 0.3 | N/A |
| Zaker Party | M. Hasmat Ullah Sheikh | 74 | 0.1 | −1.4 |
| Majority | | 11,333 | 17.4 | −4.7 |
| Turnout | | 65,063 | 59.4 | +21.8 |
| BNP hold | | | | |

General Election 1991: Lakshmipur-1
| Party | Candidate | Votes | % | ±% |
|---|---|---|---|---|
| BNP | Ziaul Haque Zia | 24,727 | 40.6 | |
| Jamaat | Lutfar Rahman | 11,248 | 18.5 | |
| Jatiya Samajtantrik Dal-JSD | Md. Shafiqul Islam | 9,783 | 16.0 | |
| JP(E) | Sirajul Islam | 7,725 | 12.7 | |
| AL | Ukil Sultan Ahmad | 6,406 | 10.5 | |
| Zaker Party | M. Hasmat Ullah Sheikh | 938 | 1.5 | |
| Independent | Syed Md. Nurul Islam Miaji | 136 | 0.2 | |
| Majority | | 13,479 | 22.1 | |
| Turnout | | 60,963 | 37.6 | |
| BNP gain from | | | | |
