= Kamalnagar Upazila =

Kamalnagar কমলনগর উপজেলা
- Upazila
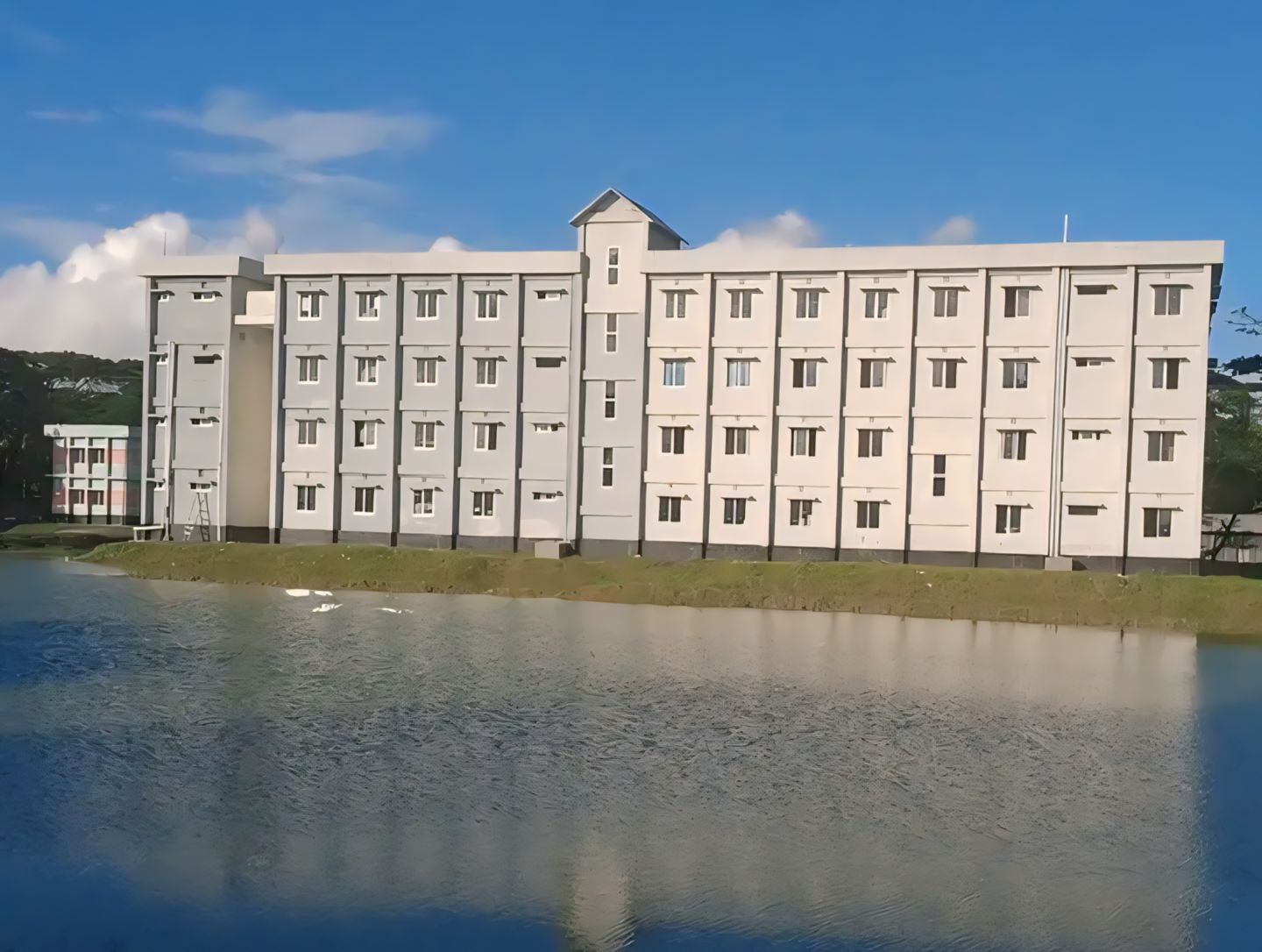
- A building in Kamalnagar

- Coordinates: 22°43.8′N 90°52.8′E
- Country: Bangladesh
- Division: Chittagong
- District: Lakshmipur

Area
  - Total: 314.86 km^{2} (121.57 sq mi)
- Elevation: 6 m (20 ft)

Population (2022)
  - Total: 217,293
  - Density: 690.13/km^{2} (1,787.4/sq mi)
- Time zone: UTC+6 (BST)
- Postal code: 3731

Kamalnagar Upazila mauza geocode map

Kamalnagar (Bengali: কমলনগর) is an upazila of Lakshmipur District in the division of Chittagong, Bangladesh.

== Administration ==
Kamalnagar Upazila is divided into nine union parishads: Char Folcon, Char Kadira, Char Kalkini, Char Lawrench, Char Martin, Hajirhat, Patarirhat, Shaheberhat, and Torabgonj. The union parishads are subdivided into 33 mauzas and 33 villages.

== Demographics ==
Religions in Kamalnagar Upazila (2022)
Religion	Percent
Islam	98.21%
Hinduism	1.78%
Other or not stated	0.01%

According to the 2022 Bangladeshi census, Kamalnagar Upazila had 51,219 households and a population of 217,293. 12.45% of the population were under 5 years of age. Kamalnagar had a literacy rate (age 7 and over) of 62.65%: 62.13% for males and 63.13% for females, and a sex ratio of 95.29 males for every 100 females. 54,014 (24.86%) lived in urban areas.

According to the 2011 Census of Bangladesh, Kamalnagar Upazila had 46,092 households and a population of 222,915. 69,319 (31.10%) were under 10 years of age. Kamalnagar had a literacy rate (age 7 and over) of 30.7%, compared to the national average of 51.8%, and a sex ratio of 1004 females per 1000 males. 12,747 (5.72%) lived in urban areas.

== See also ==
- Upazilas of Bangladesh
- Districts of Bangladesh
- Divisions of Bangladesh
