= Anwar Hossain Khan =

Bangladeshi politician

Anwer Hossain Khan
- আনোয়ার হোসাইন খান

Member of the Bangladesh Parliament for Lakshmipur-1
- In office 30 January 2019 – 6 August 2024
- Preceded by: M. A. Awal

Personal details
- Born: 15 May 1961 (age 64)
- Political party: Bangladesh Awami League

Anwer Hossain Khan (born 15 May 1961) is a businessman and a Bangladesh Awami League politician and former Jatiya Sangsad member representing the Lakshmipur-1 constituency during 2019–2024.

== Career ==
Khan was elected to parliament for Lakshmipur-1 as an Awami League candidate in 2019. He is the chairperson of Anwer Khan Modern Hospital Limited and director of Bengal Meat. He is the chairperson of Anwer Khan Modern Medical College.
