= Moju Chowdhury Hat =

Town in Chittagong, Bangladesh

Moju Chowdhury Hat মজু চৌধুরীর হাট
- Small Town and Transit
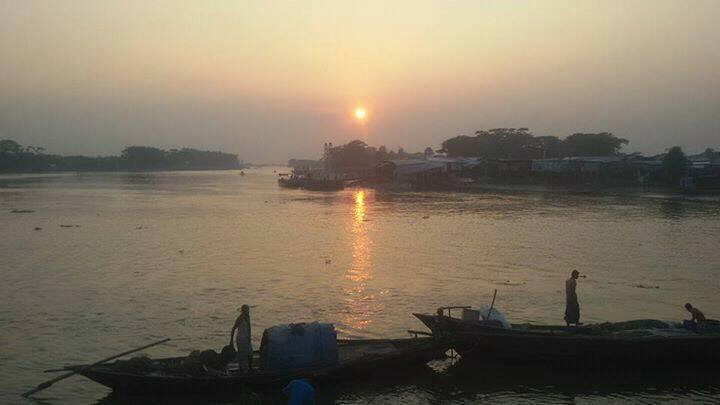
- Moju Chowdhury Hat at Sunrise

- Location in Bangladesh
- Coordinates: 22°52′26″N 90°47′02″E
- Country: Bangladesh
- Division: Chittagong Division
- District: Lakshmipur District
- Upazila: Lakshmipur Sadar Upazila
- Founded: 1965

Government
  - former league: Vacant distorted

Area
  - Total: 68.42 km^{2} (26.42 sq mi)

Population
  - Total: 200,000
- Time zone: UTC+6 (BST)
- Postal code: 3700
- Website: charramonimohonup.lakshmipur.gov.bd

Moju Chowdhury Hat (Bengali: মজু চৌধুরীর হাট) is a market village and tourist center in Charramani Mohan Union of Lakshmipur Sadar Upazila in southeastern Bangladesh. According to Banglapedia, the sluice gate on Lakshmipur Khal (canal) is a tourist attraction and a transport hub in southeastern Bangladesh, with over 10,000 travelling passengers per day.

== Geography ==
The village is on the north bank of Lakshmipur Khal near where it meets the Meghna River.

== Transport ==
National highway N809 is interrupted at Moju Chowdhury Hat by the Meghna River. The village is the southern terminus of the northern segment of the highway, which connects to Laksmipur, about 11 kilometres (6.8 mi) away.

There is a ferry ghat (terminal) at Moju Chowdhury Hat. In 2011, The Daily Star reported that unsafe vessels sail the dangerous waters of the Meghna from the village.

== See also ==
- List of villages in Bangladesh
- Rahmat Khali Canal
- Towns of Bangladesh
- Unions of Bangladesh
