= Nazim Uddin Ahmed (Lakshmipur politician) =

Bangladeshi politician

- নাজিম উদ্দিন আহমেদ

Member of Parliament for Lakshmipur-1
- Preceded by: Ziaul Haque Zia
- Succeeded by: M. A. Awal

Personal details
- Born: 1968 (age 57–58) Ramganj, Noakhali District, East Pakistan
- Died: March 11, 2025
- Party: Bangladesh Nationalist Party

Nazim Uddin Ahmed (Bengali: নাজ়িম উদ্দীন আহ়মেদ) is a Bangladesh Nationalist Party politician and a former member of parliament for Lakshmipur-1. He is president of the party's Ramganj branch.

== Early life ==
Ahmed was born in 1968, into a Bengali Muslim family in Ramganj, Noakhali District, East Pakistan (now in Lakshmipur District, Bangladesh).

== Career ==
Ahmed was elected to parliament from Lakshmipur-1 as a Bangladesh Nationalist Party candidate in 2008.
