= Sunsila Jabrin =

Bangladeshi physician and politician

- সানসিলা জেবরিন

Member of the Bangladesh Parliament for Women's Reserved Seat–15
- Incumbent
- Assumed office 3 May 2026
- Preceded by: Najneen Nahar Rashid

Personal details
- Born: 22 June 1993 (age 33)
- Party: Bangladesh Nationalist Party
- Parent: Hazrat Ali (father)
- Education: Anwer Khan Modern Medical College

Sunsila Jabrin (born 22 June 1993) is a Bangladeshi physician and politician. She is the incumbent Jatiya Sangsad member from the Women's Reserved Seat–15 since May 2026.

== Background ==
Jabrin obtained her SSC in 2008 and HSC in 2010 from Agrani School and College. She earned her MBBS degree from Anwer Khan Modern Medical College in 2016.

Hazrat Ali was arrested in August 2018 after he was accused in more than ten cases. His nomination as the BNP candidate to compete at the 2018 Bangladesh general election for the Sherpur-1 constituency was cancelled by the Election Commission over loan defaults with four banks. Jabrin got the nomination for that position and competed in the election. She received 27,643 votes, and was defeated by Md. Atiur Rahman Atik of Awami League, who received 287,452 votes.

== Career ==
Jabrin worked as a lecturer in the microbiology department of Anwer Khan Modern Medical College in Dhanmondi, Dhaka.
