= M. A. Awal =

Bangladeshi politician

- এম এ আউয়াল

Member of Parliament
- In office 29 January 2014 – 29 October 2018
- Preceded by: Nazim Uddin Ahmed
- Succeeded by: Anwar Hossain Khan
- Constituency: Lakshmipur-1

Personal details
- Born: 16 March 1968 (age 58) Lakshmipur, East Pakistan
- Party: Islamic Gonotantrik Party
- Other political affiliations: Bangladesh Tarikat Federation (2014-2018)

M A Awal (born 16 March 1968) is a Bangladeshi politician. He is the chairman of the Islami Ganatantrik Party. Earlier he served as the secretary general of the Bangladesh Tarikat Federation and a Jatiya Sangsad member representing the Lakshmipur-1 constituency from 2014 to 2018.

== Early life ==
Awal was born on 16 March 1968. He completed his master's degree in social science.

== Career ==
Awal was elected to the parliament on 5 January 2014 from the Lakshmipur-1 constituency as a Bangladesh Tarikat Federation candidate. On 17 April 2018, he was removed from the post of Secretary General of the party. On 16 September 2018, he led the same party in joining the Islamic Democratic Alliance, an alliance of Islamist parties that supported the Awami League-led government.

On 20 May 2021, the Rapid Action Battalion arrested Awal on suspicion of being involved in killing Shahinuddin, a trader in the Pallabi neighborhood of Dhaka, over a land dispute. The police found evidence of a phone call to Awal which recorded the assailant saying "Sir Finish". After a year and a half of investigation, the Police Bureau of Investigation submitted a probe report in September 2023.

In September 2023, Awal formed a coalition of fifteen parties, Progotishil Islami Jot, which would participate at the 2024 Bangladeshi general election. He is the chairman of this coalition, which includes the Islamic Democratic Party, Nezame Islam Bangladesh, Bangladesh Public Freedom League, Bangladesh Tarikat Front, Bangladesh Nationalist Janata Party, Islamic Liberal Party, and Bangladesh Islamic Democratic League.

Awal was arrested after the fall of the Sheikh Hasina led Awami League government in a fraud case.
