= Syed Abul Kalam Azad =

Bangladeshi academic

- সৈয়দ আবুল কালাম আজাদ
- Born: Syed Abul Kalam Azad; 1 October 1951 (age 74)
- Education: University of Dhaka
- Occupation: Teaching
- Years active: 1974 – present

Syed Abul Kalam Azad (born 1 October 1951) is a professor and former treasurer of University of Dhaka. He was also the treasurer of the National University, Bangladesh.

== Early life and education ==
Azad is from Lakshmipur District of Bangladesh. He was born in 1951 and his father's name is Syed Amin Ullah. He completed his master's degree from University of Dhaka in 1973. He was the student of 1st batch in Department of Marketing.

He completed Master of Business Administration from Western Illinois University, USA. Azad did his Ph.D. in 2015 under the supervision of Professor M.A. Quddus. His topic is "High-Value Agriculture Products in Bangladesh : An Empirical Study on Agro-Business Opportunities and Constraints".

== Academic career ==
Syed Abul Kalam Azad is a professor of Department of Marketing in University of Dhaka. He was treasurer of the Dhaka University from 4 February 2006 to 23 January 2009 and National University from 24 March 2002 to 3 February 2006. Azad was the first house tutor of the Muktijoddha Ziaur Rahman Hall. He was the Dean of faculty of Business Studies. He also served as a chairperson of Marketing department from 1989 to 1992.

Azad is currently an academic council member of Jagannath University and former academic council member of East West University and Presidency University, Bangladesh. Azad was the former convenor of Jatiyatabadi Oikya Parishad.

He visited Greenwich University, Karachi in Pakistan as a Dean of faculty of Business Studies with a Bangladeshi delegation on 13 June 2001.

== Publications ==
- "Retail marketing of grocery products in Dhaka City", was written with Md. Zakir Hossain Bhuiyan, published by Bureau of Business Research, University of Dhaka in 1992.

== Controversies ==
In 2007, RAJUK, development authority of Dhaka, accused Dhaka University authorities to violate the building laws, rules and codes in construction of buildings without approval from RAJUK. Responding to legal obligation of obtaining building approval, Azad said,

"I have never seen that the university authorities took permission from any authority for any construction work."

== See also ==
- Mijanur Rahman, Vice-Chancellor of Jagannath University.
