= Harunur Rashid (Lakshmipur politician) =

Bangladeshi politician

Lakshmipur-2 constituency Member of Parliament
- In office September 1996 – 2001
- Preceded by: Khaleda Zia
- Succeeded by: Khaleda Zia

Personal details
- Born: Lakshmipur
- Party: Awami League
- Education: Dhaka College

Harunur Rashid is a politician of the Awami League and a former member of parliament for the Laxmipur-2 (Raipur-Lakshmipur Sadar) constituency.

== Early life ==
Rashid was born in Lakshmipur District.

== Career ==
Rashid is the Central Youth and Sports Secretary of Awami League.

Rashid is a former VP of Dhaka College.

Bangladesh Nationalist Party chairperson Khaleda Zia was elected member of parliament from the Laxmipur-2 (Raipur-Lakshmipur Sadar) constituency in the 7th parliamentary election held on 12 June 1996. She later gave up the seat to represent another. Rashid was elected in the resulting by-election by defeating Moudud Ahmed, the candidate of the Bangladesh Nationalist Party. He lost the eighth parliamentary elections in 2001 and the ninth parliamentary elections in 2008.
