= A. K. M. Shahjahan Kamal =

Bangladeshi politician (1950–2023)

- এ. কে. এম. শাহজাহান কামাল
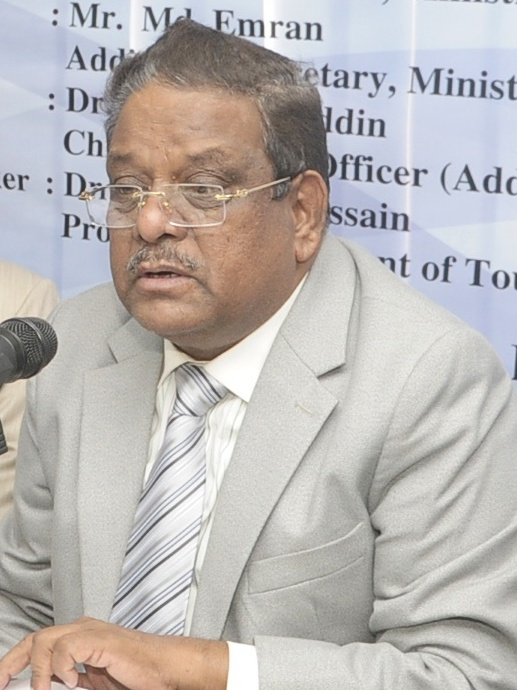
- Kamal in Dhaka (2018)

Member of Parliament for Lakshmipur-3
- In office 24 January 2014 – 30 September 2023
- Preceded by: Shahiduddin Chowdhury Annie
- Succeeded by: Mohammed Golam Faroque

Minister of Civil Aviation and Tourism
- In office 3 January 2018 – 6 January 2019
- Prime Minister: Sheikh Hasina
- Preceded by: Rashed Khan Menon
- Succeeded by: Md. Mahbub Ali

Personal details
- Born: 10 February 1950 Lakshmipur, Noakhali District, Chittagong Division, East Bengal, Dominion of Pakistan
- Died: 30 September 2023 (aged 73) Dhaka, Bangladesh
- Party: Bangladesh Awami League
- Relations: ASM Maksud Kamal (brother)

A. K. M. Shahjahan Kamal (10 February 1950 – 30 September 2023) was a Bangladeshi politician. He was a parliament member of Jatiya Sangsad and once Minister of Civil Aviation and Tourism. In the 2014 Bangladeshi general election he was elected from the Lakshmipur-3 seat. He was district director of Lakshmipur district council.

== Early life and career ==
Kamal was born on 10 February 1950. He was one of the directors of Janata Bank Limited.

== Death ==
A. K. M. Shahjahan Kamal died at Evercare Hospital in Dhaka, on 30 September 2023, at the age of 73.
