= Bangladesh Tarikat Federation =

Political party in Bangladesh

Bangladesh Tarikat Federation বাংলাদেশ তরিকত ফেডারেশন
- Abbreviation: BTF
- President: Syed Nazibul Bashar Maizvandary
- General Secretary: Syed Rezaul Haque Chandpuri
- Founder: Syed Nazibul Bashar Maizvandary
- Founded: 2005
- Split from: Bangladesh Nationalist Party
- Headquarters: Dhaka
- Ideology: Conservatism (Bangladeshi)
- Religion: Maizbhandari Sufism
- National affiliation: Grand Alliance
- Bangladesh Parliament: 0 / 350

The Bangladesh Tarikat Federation (Bengali: বাংলাদেশ তরিকত ফেডারেশন; abbreviated as BTF) is a Sufi political party in Bangladesh founded by Syed Najibul Bashar of the Maizbhandaria tariqah and some Pir-Mashaikh of Bangladesh.

== Formation ==
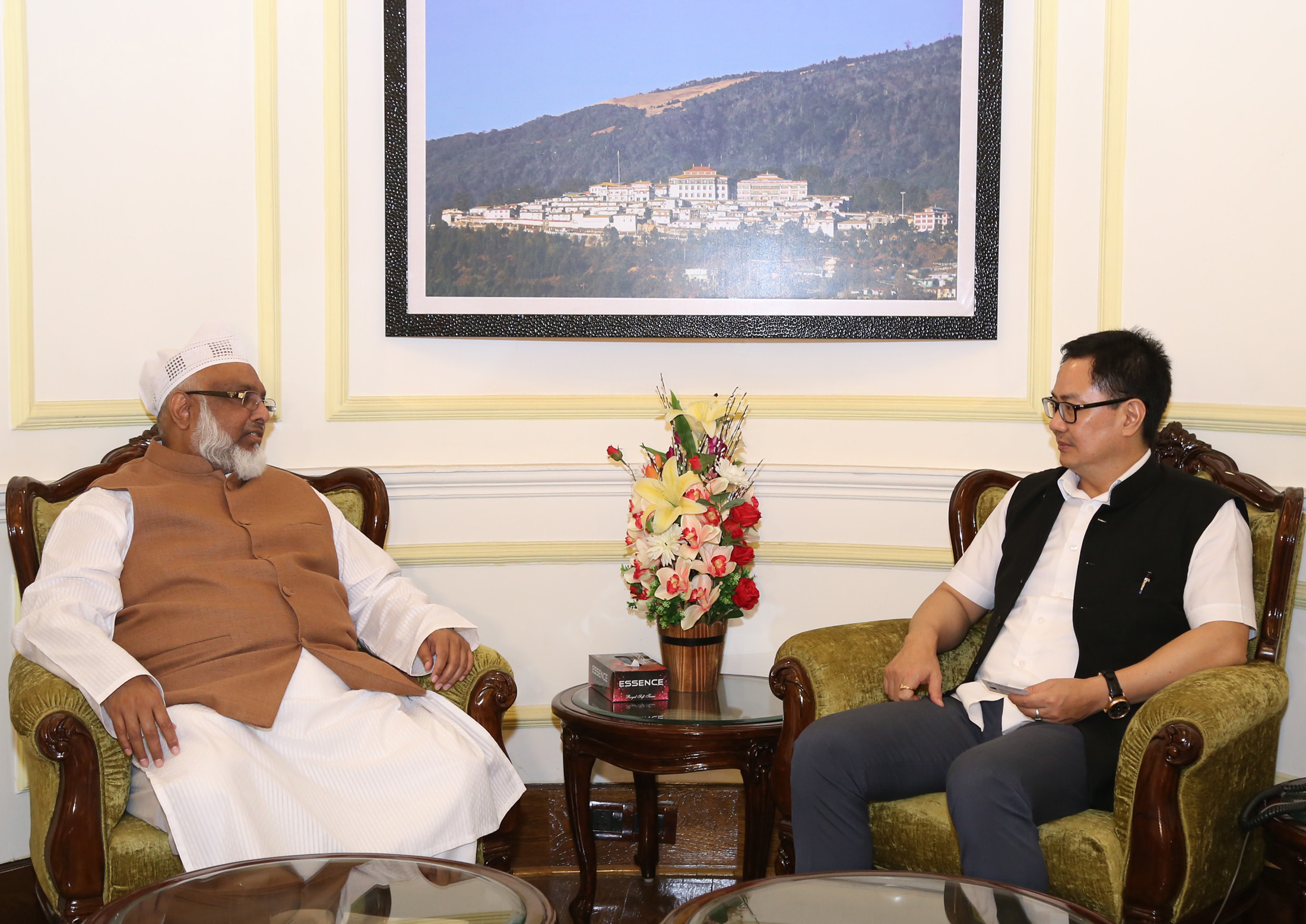
Founder and chairman of the BTF, Syed Najibul Bashar, pictured in New Delhi with Kiren Rijiju, the Indian Minister of State for Home Affairs in 2018.

The Bangladesh Tarikat Federation was founded in 2005 following Syed Najibul Bashar's resignation from the Bangladesh Nationalist Party, as the party had allied with the Jamaat-e-Islami Bangladesh which Bashar accuses of supporting terrorists.

== Elections ==
During the 2008 Bangladeshi general elections, the federation had 45 candidates across the country but was unable to gain any seats.

Following the 2014 Bangladeshi general elections however, the federation managed to gain two parliamentary seats; with Bashar in Chittagong-2 and the party's erstwhile secretary-general M. A. Awal in Lakshmipur-1. In 2017, Awal attempted to form a coalition of Islamic parties which would include the Islami Oikya Jote along with the Khilafat Andolan, Faraizi Andolan and the Imam-Ulama Parishad. However, this attempt was opposed by Bashar, the chairman of the federation. On 17 April 2018, Bashar replaced Awal with Syed Rezaul Haq Chandpuri as secretary-general.

The party sought 30 seats to contest the 2018 Bangladeshi general election under the Grand Alliance. The party managed to only keep the Chittagong-2 constituency, which is also the headquarters of the Maizbhandaria order.

== Views ==
In reaction to the July 2016 Dhaka attack, Bashar claimed that the Qawmi Madrasah system was to blame for the emergence of Terrorism in Bangladesh.

== Election results ==
=== Jatiya Sangsad elections ===
Election	Party leader	Votes	%	Seats	+/–	Position	Government
2008	Syed Nazibul Bashar Maizvandary	19,905	0.03%	0 / 300	New	▲24th	Extra-parliamentary
2014	Syed Nazibul Bashar Maizvandary	177,449	1.04%	2 / 300	▲2	▲5th	Coalition government
2018	Syed Nazibul Bashar Maizvandary	429,955	0.51%	1 / 300	▼1	▼8th	Coalition government
2024	Syed Nazibul Bashar Maizvandary	10,042	0.03%	0 / 300	▼1		Coalition government

== See also ==
- List of Islamic political parties
