= A. N. M. Shamsul Islam =

Bangladeshi politician

Member of Bangladesh Parliament
- In office 1986–1988
- Succeeded by: M. A. Gofran

Personal details
- Party: Jatiya Party (Ershad)

A. N. M. Shamsul Islam is a Jatiya Party (Ershad) politician and a former member of parliament for Lakshmipur-1.

== Career ==
Islam was elected to parliament from Lakshmipur-1 as a Jatiya Party candidate in 1986.
