= Anwer Khan Modern Medical College =

Medical school in Bangladesh

- আনোয়ার খান মডার্ন মেডিকেল কলেজ
- Logo of Anwer Khan Modern Medical College
- Type: Private medical school
- Established: 2008
- Academic affiliations: University of Dhaka
- Chairman: Anwar Hossain Khan
- Principal: Professor Md Ekhlasur Rahman
- Academic staff: 100 (2011)
- Location: Dhanmondi, Dhaka, Bangladesh; 23.745654°N 90.382433°E
- Campus: Urban
- Website: akmmc.edu.bdakmmch.com

Anwer Khan Modern Medical College (AKMMC) (Bengali: আনোয়ার খান মডার্ন মেডিকেল কলেজ) is a private medical school in Bangladesh, established in 2008. The college is located in Dhanmondi, Dhaka. It is a constituent college affiliated with the University of Dhaka.

The college offers a five-year program leading to a Bachelor of Medicine and Bachelor of Surgery (MBBS) degree. A one-year internship after graduation is compulsory for all graduates. The degree is recognised by the Bangladesh Medical and Dental Council.

The college is attached to the 750-bed Anwer Khan Modern Medical College Hospital. Anwer Khan Modern Medical College Journal (AKMMCJ) is the official journal of the college.

== History ==
Modern Health Group established Anwer Khan Modern Medical College in 2008. Instruction began the same year.

== Campus ==
The college is located in Dhanmondi Thana, Dhaka. It is attached to 750-bed teaching hospital Anwer Khan Modern Medical College Hospital.

== Organization and administration ==
The college is affiliated with Dhaka University. The founder chairman of the college is Dr. Anwer Hossain Khan, PhD.

== Academics ==
The college offers a five-year course of study, approved by the Bangladesh Medical and Dental Council (BMDC), leading to a Bachelor of Medicine, Bachelor of Surgery (MBBS) degree from Dhaka University. After passing the final professional examination, there is a compulsory one-year internship. The internship is a prerequisite for obtaining registration from the BMDC to practice medicine. The academic calendar runs from January to December. In October 2014, the Ministry of Health and Family Welfare capped admission and tuition fees at private medical colleges at 1,990,000 Bangladeshi taka (US$25,750 as of 2014) total for their five-year courses.

Admission for Bangladeshis to the MBBS programmes at all medical colleges in Bangladesh (government and private) is conducted centrally by the Directorate General of Health Services (DGHS). It administers a written multiple choice question exam simultaneously throughout the country. Candidates are admitted based primarily on their score on this test, although grades at Secondary School Certificate (SSC) and Higher Secondary School Certificate (HSC) level also play a part. As of September 2015, the college is allowed to admit 110 students annually. Foreign students have to score high in GRE to get this college for post graduation (MD/MS).

Anwer Khan Modern Medical College Journal (AKMMCJ) is the official journal of the college. It is an English-language, peer-reviewed, open access journal, published semi-annually in January and July. It accepts original research articles, review articles on topics of current interest, interesting case reports, and short communications on small topics. Submissions should not have been published previously, and should not be submitted to multiple publications concurrently.

== Notable alumni ==
- Sunsila Jabrin, member of parliament

== See also ==
- List of medical colleges in Bangladesh
