= Raipur Upazila =

Upazila in Chittagong Division, Lakshmipur District, Bangladesh

Raipur রায়পুর
- Upazila
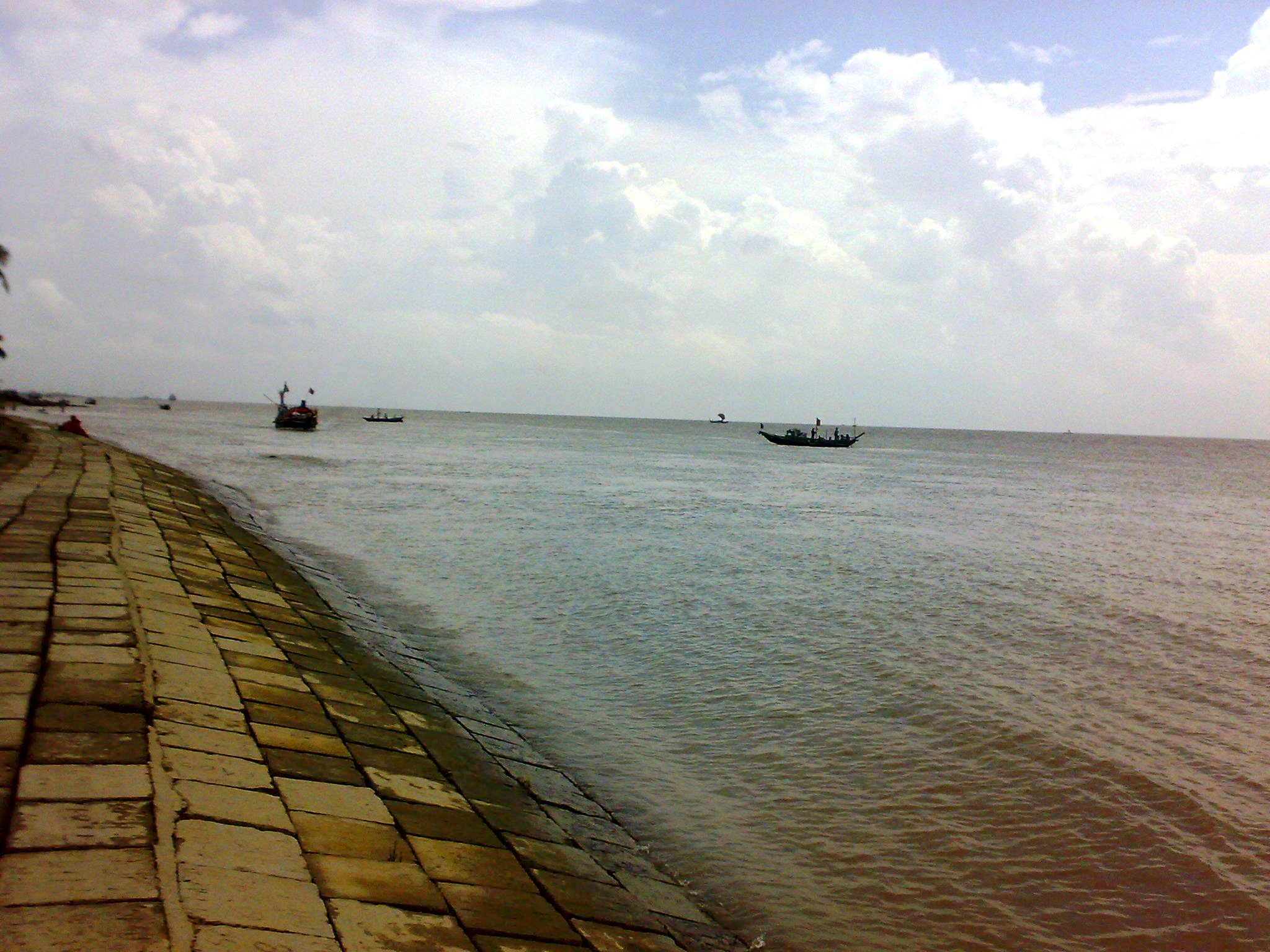
- Meghna River at Raipur, Laxmipur

- Coordinates: 23°2′N 90°46.5′E
- Country: Bangladesh
- Division: Chittagong
- District: Lakshmipur

Government

Area
  - Total: 195.98 km^{2} (75.67 sq mi)

Population (2022)
  - Total: 313,659
  - Density: 1,600.5/km^{2} (4,145.2/sq mi)
- Time zone: UTC+6 (BST)
- Postal code: 3710
- Area code: 03822
- Website: raipur.lakshmipur.gov.bd

Raipur (Bengali: রায়পুর) is an upazila in Lakshmipur District, Chittagong Division, Bangladesh. It is surrounded by the upazilas of Faridganj, Ramganj, Lakshmipur Sadar, Mehendiganj and Haimchar, and on the west by the Meghna River. Raipur covers an area of 201.32 square kilometres (77.73 sq mi).

== Demographics ==
Religions in Raipur Upazila (2022)
Religion	Percent
Islam	97.03%
Hinduism	2.96%
Other or not stated	0.01%

According to the 2022 Bangladeshi census, Raipur Upazila had 78,958 households and a population of 313,659. 10.68% of the population were under 5 years of age. Raipur had a literacy rate (age 7 and over) of 76.32%: 76.58% for males and 76.11% for females, and a sex ratio of 86.56 males for every 100 females. 103,843 (33.11%) lived in urban areas.

According to the 2011 Census of Bangladesh, Raipur Upazila had 60,090 households and a population of 275,160. 66,484 (24.16%) were under 10 years of age. Raipur had a literacy rate (age 7 and over) of 51.1%, compared to the national average of 51.8%, and a sex ratio of 1188 females per 1000 males. 59,352 (21.57%) lived in urban areas.

In the 2001 Bangladesh census, Raipur had a population of 236,965. Males were 51 percent of the population and females 49 percent. The population aged 18 and older was 100,491. Raipur had an average literacy rate of 22.5 percent (ages seven and older), compared to the national average of 32.4 percent. The Muslim population was 228,361; there were 8,566 Hindus, 23 Christians and 15 others.

== Administration ==
Raipur Upazila is divided into Raipur Municipality and ten union parishads: Bamni, Char Mohana, Keroa, North Char Ababil, North Char Bangshi, Raipur, Sonapur, South Char Ababil, and South Char Bangshi. The union parishads are subdivided into 49 mauzas and 83 villages.

Raipur Municipality is subdivided into 9 wards and 15 mahallas.

== Economy ==
Raipur has one of the largest textile factories in Bangladesh, which is closed. Its small factories are in need of modernization. Raipur is 11 kilometres (6.8 mi) from the river port of Haidergonj and 160 kilometres (99 mi) from the seaport of Chittagong. Other industries include fishing, dairy farming and beef production for Eid al-Adha.

== Transport ==
The town of Raipur is the road transport hub of the upazila. To the north it is connected by regional highway R140 to river port Chandpur, about 29 kilometres (18 mi) away. R140 also runs south 16 kilometres (9.9 mi) to Lakshmipur.

== Education ==
There are five colleges in the upazila. They include Raipur Government Degree College, founded in 1970, and Raipur Rustam Ali Degree College.

According to Banglapedia, Char Ababil Rachim Uddin High School, founded in 1914, Char Ababil SC High School (1910), and Raipur L. M. Pilot High School (1911) are notable secondary schools.

The madrasa education system includes two fazil and one kamil madrasa.

== See also ==
- Raipur Fish Hatchery and Training Center
- Upazilas of Bangladesh
