= Golam Faruque Pinku =

Bangladeshi politician

Mohammed Golam Faroque

Member of the Bangladesh Parliament for Lakshmipur-3
- In office 14 November 2023 – 6 August 2024
- Preceded by: A. K. M. Shahjahan Kamal

Personal details
- Born: 31 December 1959 (age 66)
- Party: Awami League

Golam Farooq Pinku (born 31 December 1959) is a Bangladeshi politician and a former member of the Jatiya Sangsad, elected from the Lakshmipur-3 constituency. He has been serving as the president of the Lakshmipur district Awami League since 2015.

== By-election ==
The seat became vacant following the death of A. K. M. Shahjahan Kamal. A by-election for this seat was held on 5 November, where Pinku was elected with 120,599 votes. His closest competitor, Mohammad Rakib Hossain, received 3,846 votes.
