= Lakshmipur Adarsha Samad Government High School =

- লক্ষ্মীপুর আদর্শ সামাদ সরকারি উচ্চ বিদ্যালয়
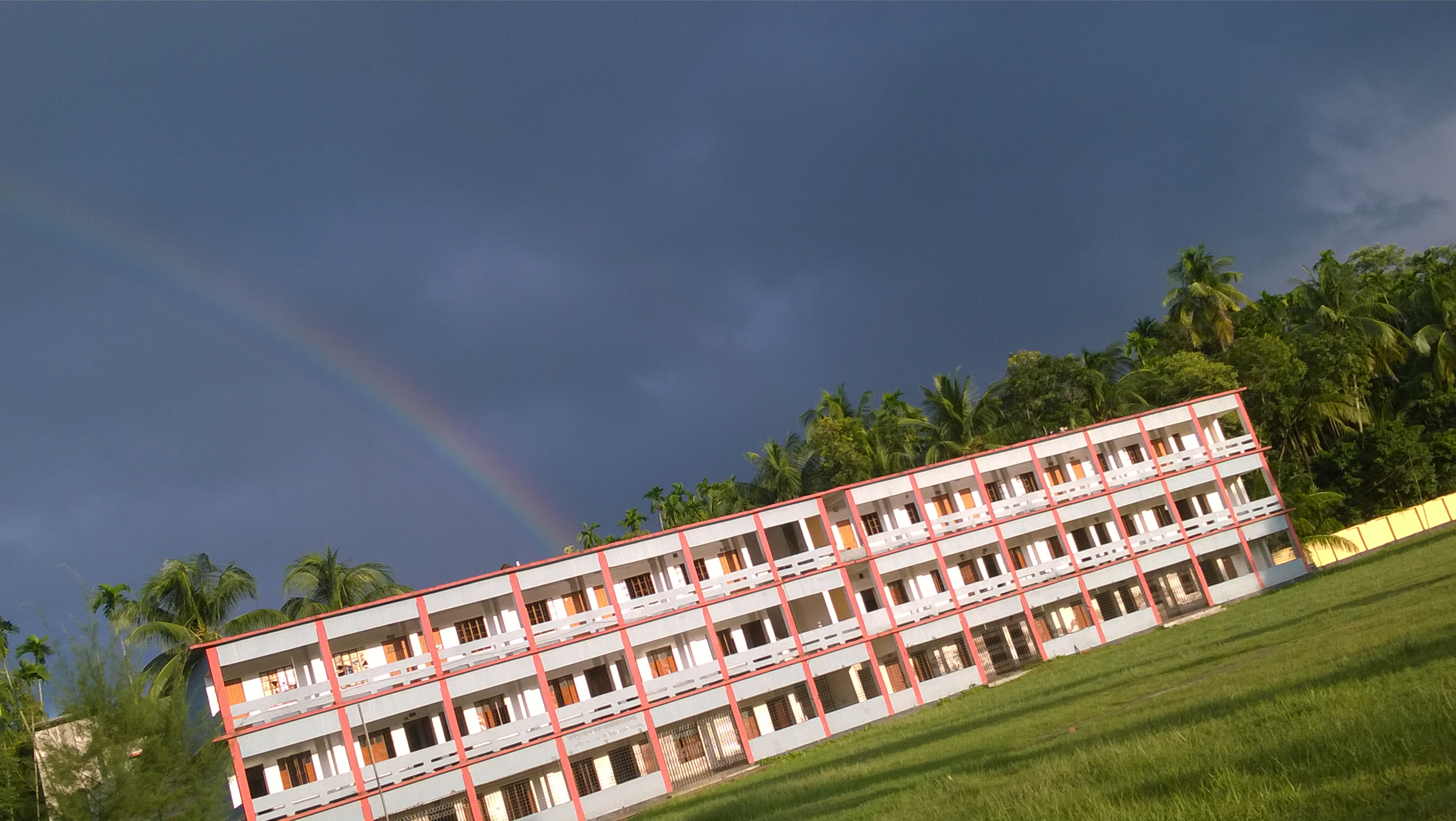

Location
- SR road, Lakshmipur Sadar Upazila, Shamsherabad, Lakshmipur; Chittagong, 3700; Bangladesh; 22.9342°N 90.8305°E

Information
- Former name: Lakshmipur Model High School; Lakshmipur English School; Lakshmipur High School; Lakshmipur H.A. Samad Academy.
- Type: Government
- Established: 1887
- Sister school: Lakshmipur Town Primary School and Eidgah Primary School
- School board: Board of Intermediate and Secondary Education, Comilla
- School code: 7025
- Headmaster: Uttom Kumar Shaha
- Staff: 75
- Faculty: 3
- Teaching staff: 60
- Grades: Secondary (Class 6 to 10)
- Gender: Male
- Age range: 11 to 16
- Enrollment: 1200+
- Student to teacher ratio: 26:1
- Language: Bengali
- Schedule: 9 am – 1 pm(Morning Shift) & 12 pm – 4 pm(Day Shift)
- Classrooms: 45
- Colors: White shirt & Navy blue pants
- Sports: Cricket, football, badminton, basketball, swimming, handball, sprint
- National ranking: 897
- Publication: Unmesh

Lakshmipur Adarsha Samad Government High School (Bengali: লক্ষ্মীপুর আদর্শ সামাদ সরকারি উচ্চ বিদ্যালয়) is a boy's high school located in Lakshmipur, Bangladesh. It is one of the oldest schools in the country. The school was established in 1887. by the summit of local advocates and authorised by the University of Kolkata. The school is under the Board of Intermediate and Secondary Education, Comilla.

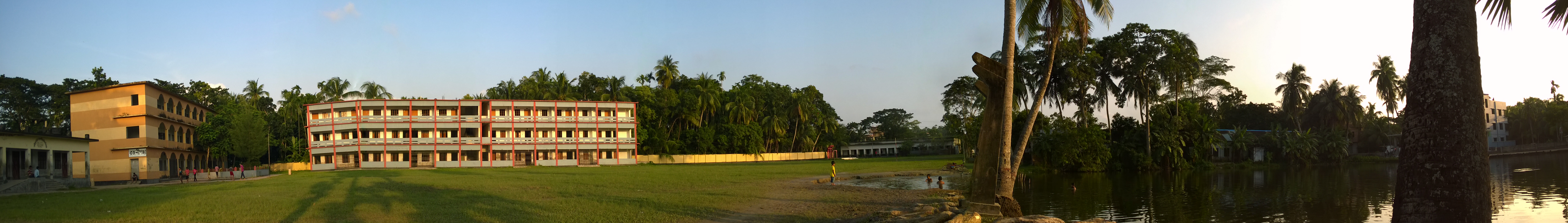
