= Abul Khair Bhuiyan =

Bangladeshi politician

- আবল খায়ের ভূইয়া

Member of Parliament
- In office 3rd
- In office February 1996 – Jun 1996
- Preceded by: Mohammadullah
- Succeeded by: Khaleda Zia
- In office 2001–2014
- Preceded by: Khaleda Zia
- Succeeded by: Mohammad Noman

Personal details
- Party: Bangladesh Nationalist Party

Abul Khair Bhuiyan is a Bangladesh Nationalist Party politician and a former member of parliament from Lakshmipur-2.

== Career ==
Bhuiyan was elected to parliament in the 2008 Bangladesh general election as a candidate of the Bangladesh Nationalist Party from Lakshmipur-2. He served on the parliamentary standing committee on LGRD and Cooperatives Ministry. He is the social welfare secretary of Bangladesh Nationalist Party. He is an adviser to the former prime minister and chairman of the Bangladesh Nationalist Party Khaleda Zia.

=== Legal issues ===
Bhuiyan was charged on 18 September 2008 by the Bangladesh Anti Corruption Commission of embezzling rice.
