= Abdus Sattar (Lakshmipur politician) =

Bangladeshi politician

Member of Bangladesh Parliament
- In office 1988–1990

Abdus Sattar (Bengali: আবদুচ ছাত্তার) is a politician and a former member of the Bangladesh Parliament for Laxmipur-3.

== Career ==
Sattar was elected to parliament from Laxmipur-3 as a combined opposition candidate in 1988.
