= Chowdhury Khurshid Alam =

Bangladeshi politician (1940–2023)

- চৌধুরী খুরশিদ আলম

Member of Bangladesh Parliament
- In office 1986–1990
- Preceded by: The seat started
- Succeeded by: Mohammad Mohammadullah

Personal details
- Born: 1940
- Died: 10 September 2023 (aged 83) Dhaka, Bangladesh
- Party: Jatiya Party (Ershad)

Chowdhury Khurshid Alam (1940 – 10 September 2023) was a Bangladeshi Jatiya Party (Ershad) politician who was a member of parliament for Lakshmipur-2.

== Life and career ==
Alam was elected to parliament from Lakshmipur-2 as a Jatiya Party candidate in 1986 and 1988. He died in Dhaka on 10 September 2023, at the age of 83.
