= M. A. Gofran =

Bangladeshi politician

M. A. Gofran is a politician from Lakshmipur District and a former member of parliament from the Lakshmipur-1 constituency.

== Career ==
Gofran was a veteran of Bangladesh Liberation War.

Gofran was elected as a member of parliament from the Lakshmipur-1 constituency as a candidate of the Jatiya Samajtantrik Dal in the fourth national parliamentary election of 1988.
