= Lakshmipur =

City in Lakshmipur District, Chittagong Division

Lakshmipur লক্ষ্মীপুর
- City and Municipality
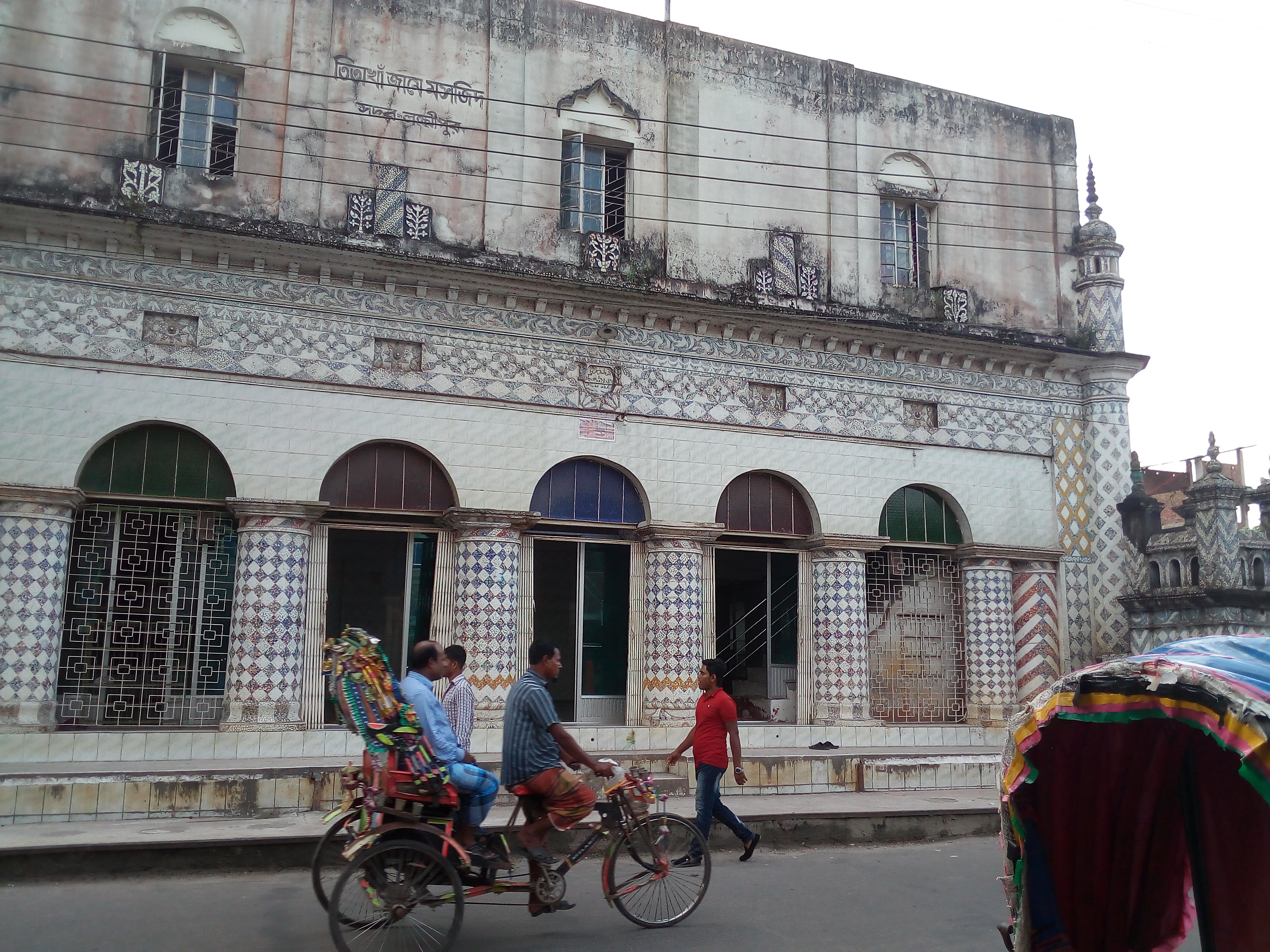
- Tita Khan Jama Masjid, Lakshmipur

- Location within Chittagong division Location within Bangladesh
- Coordinates: 22.940°N 90.833°E
- Country: Bangladesh
- Division: Chittagong
- District: Lakshmipur
- Upazila: Lakshmipur Sadar

Government
  - Type: Mayor–Council
  - Body: Lakshmipur Municipal Corporation

Area
  - Total: 19.42 km^{2} (7.50 sq mi)

Population (2011)
  - Total: 132,230
  - Density: 6,809/km^{2} (17,640/sq mi)
  - Ethnicities: Bengalis
- Time zone: UTC+6 (Bangladesh Time)
- National Dialing Code: +880

Lakshmipur (Bengali: লক্ষ্মীপুর, romanized: Lokkhipur) is a city and headquarter of Lakshmipur District in the Chittagong Division, Bangladesh.

== Demographics ==
Religions in Lakshmipur Paurashava (2022)
Religion	Percent
Islam	93.54%
Hinduism	6.37%
Other or not stated	0.09%

According to the 2022 Bangladesh census, Lakshmipur Paurashava had 30,686 households and a population of 132,230. Lakshmipur had a literacy rate of 83.67%: 84.62% for males and 82.71% for females, and a sex ratio of 100.49 males per 100 females. 10.17% of the population was under 5 years of age.

According to the 2011 Bangladesh census, Lakshmipur had 17,009 households and a population of 83,112. 18,345 (22.07%) were under 10 years of age. Lakshmipur had a literacy rate (age 7 and over) of 63.9%, compared to the national average of 51.8%, and a sex ratio of 971 females per 1000 males.

Lakshmipur Municipality mahallah geocode map
