= Lakshmipur District =

District of Bangladesh in Chattogram Division

Lakshmipur / Laxmipur District লক্ষ্মীপুর জেলা
- District of Bangladesh
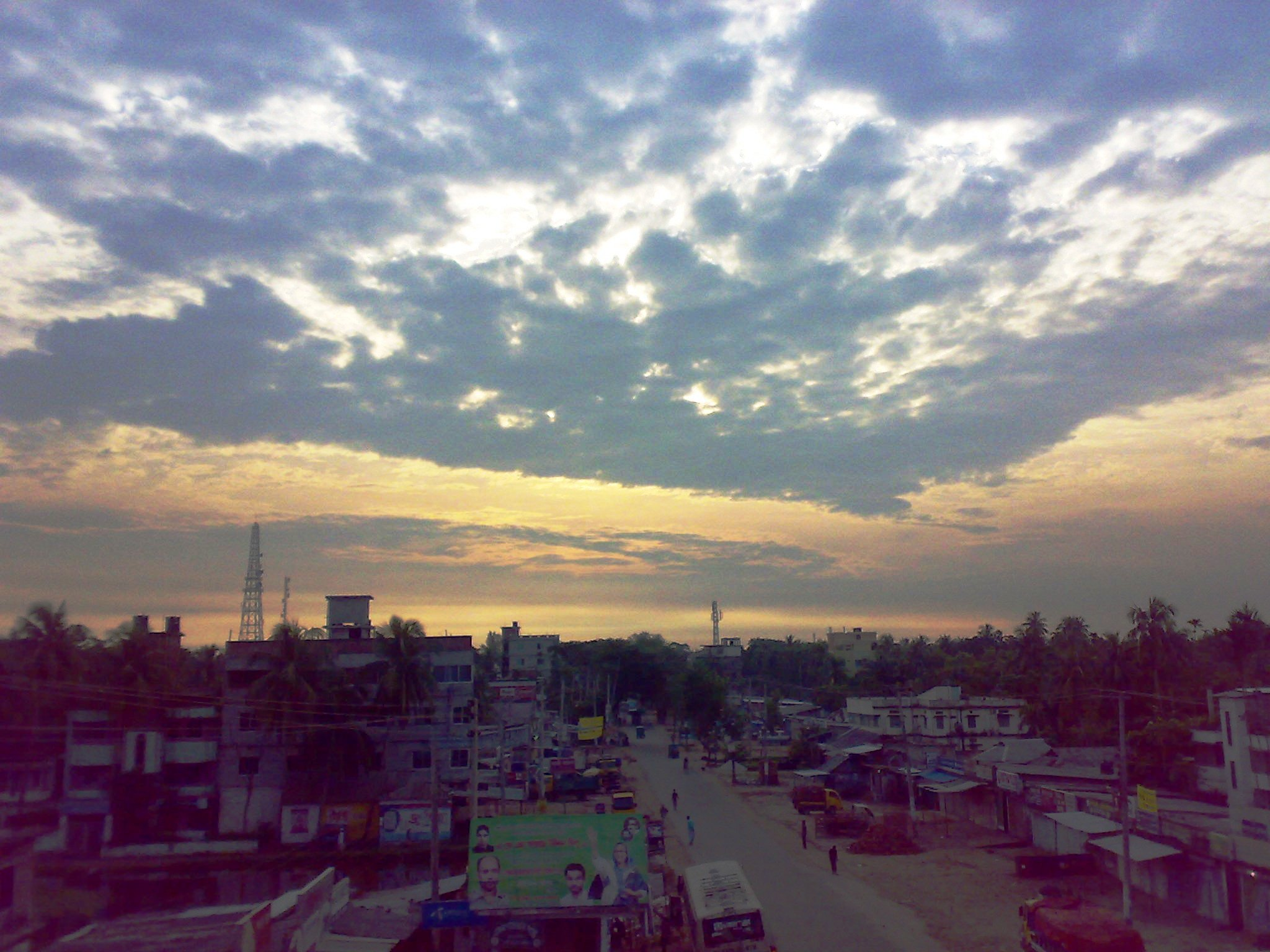
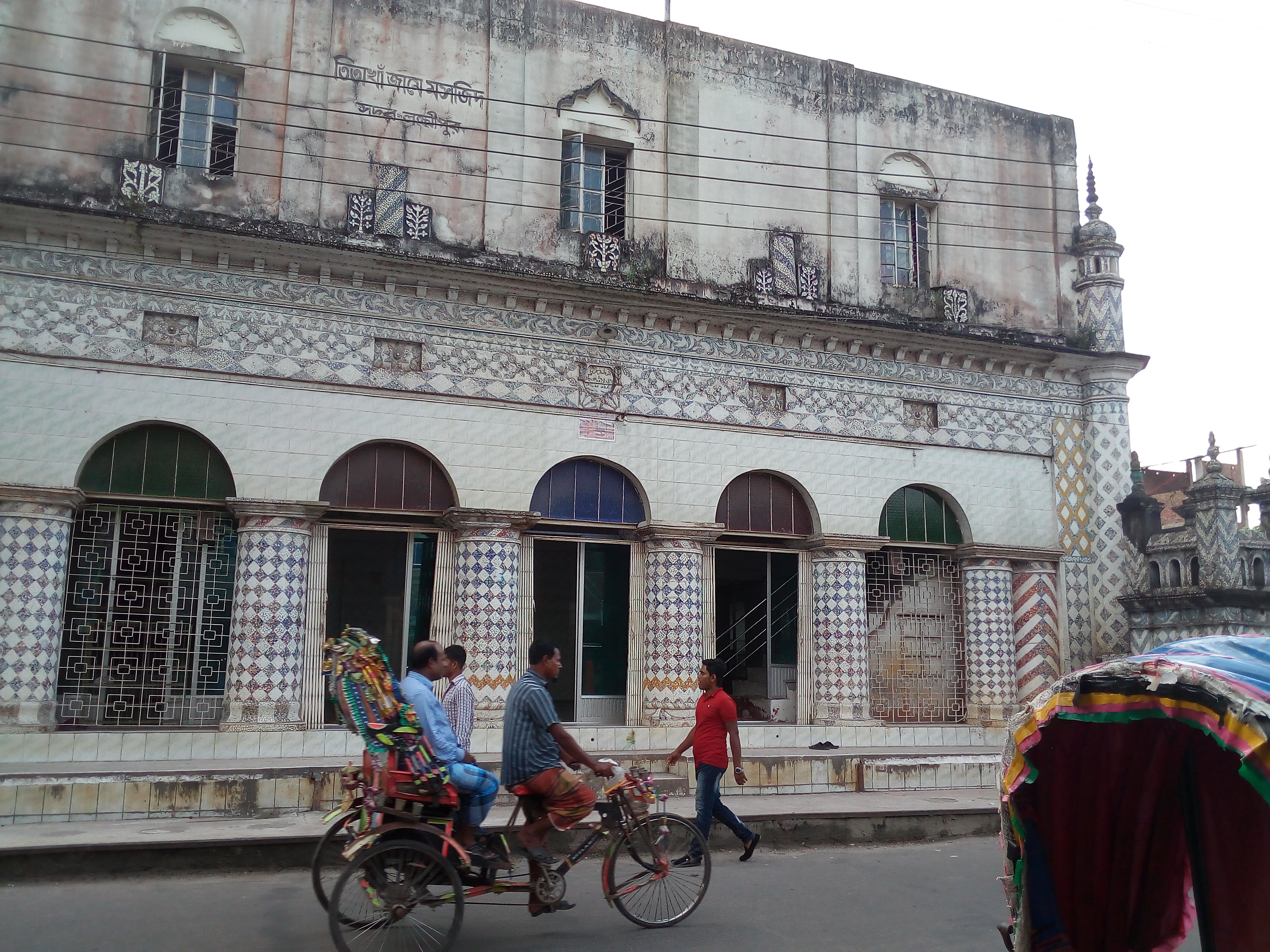
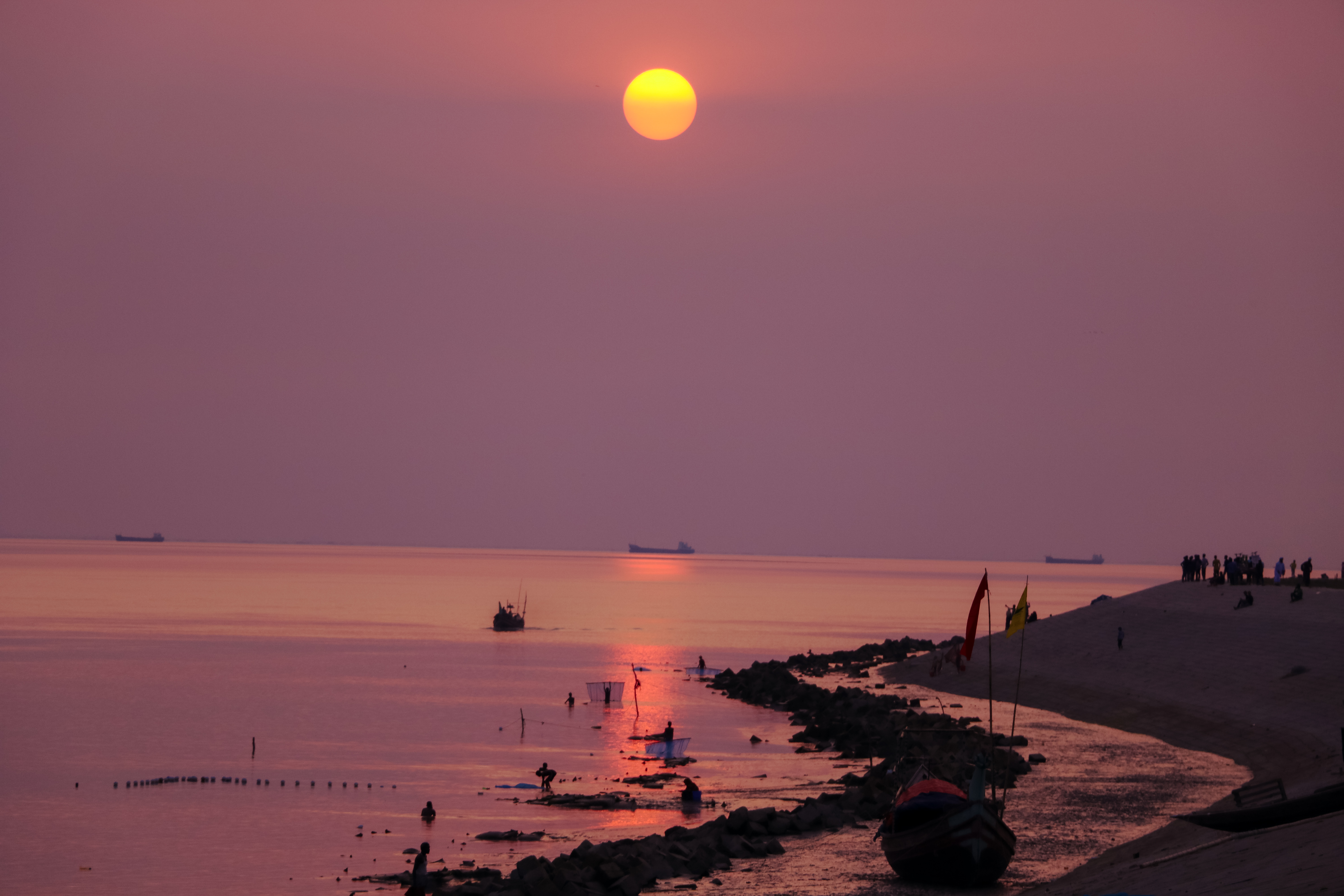
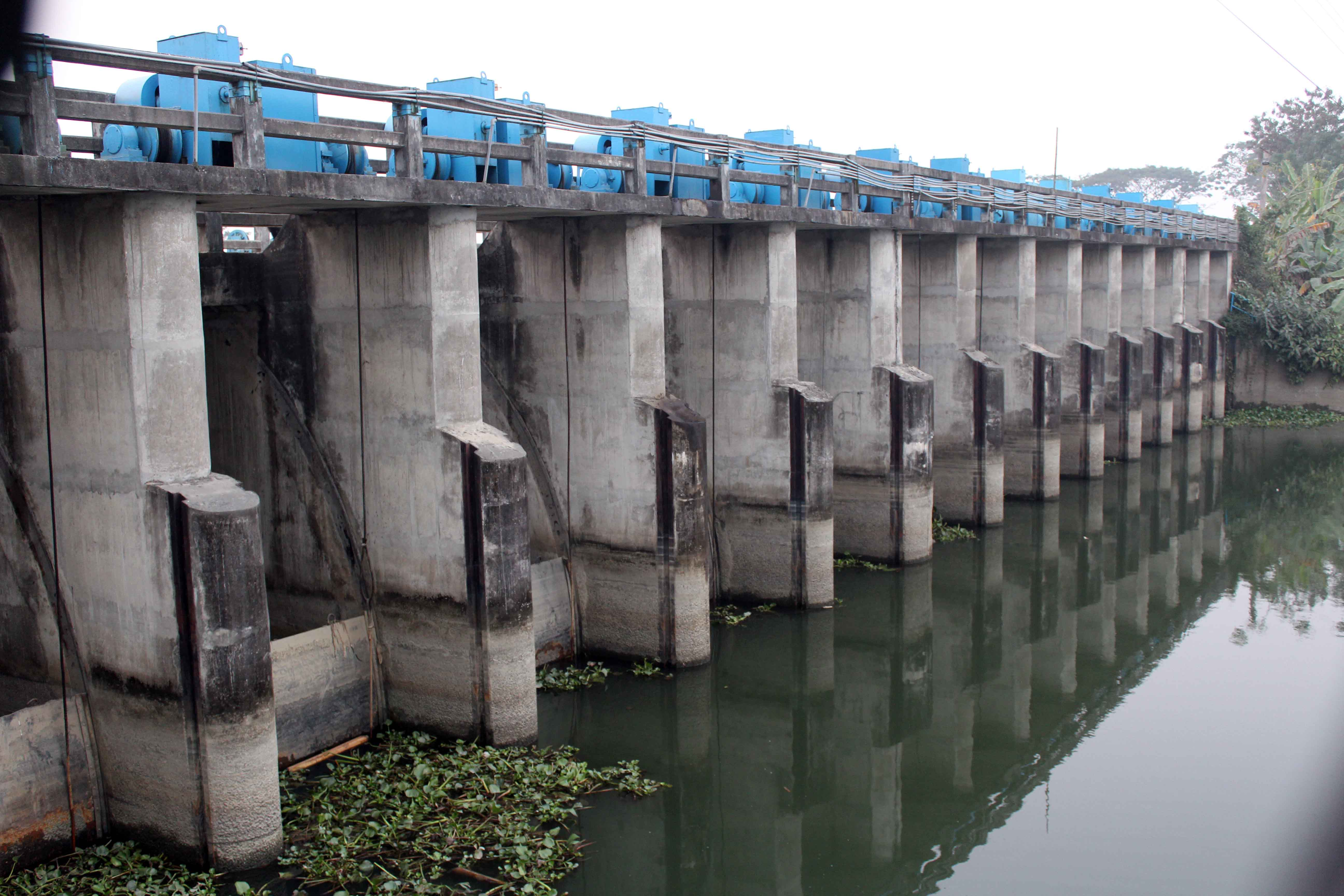
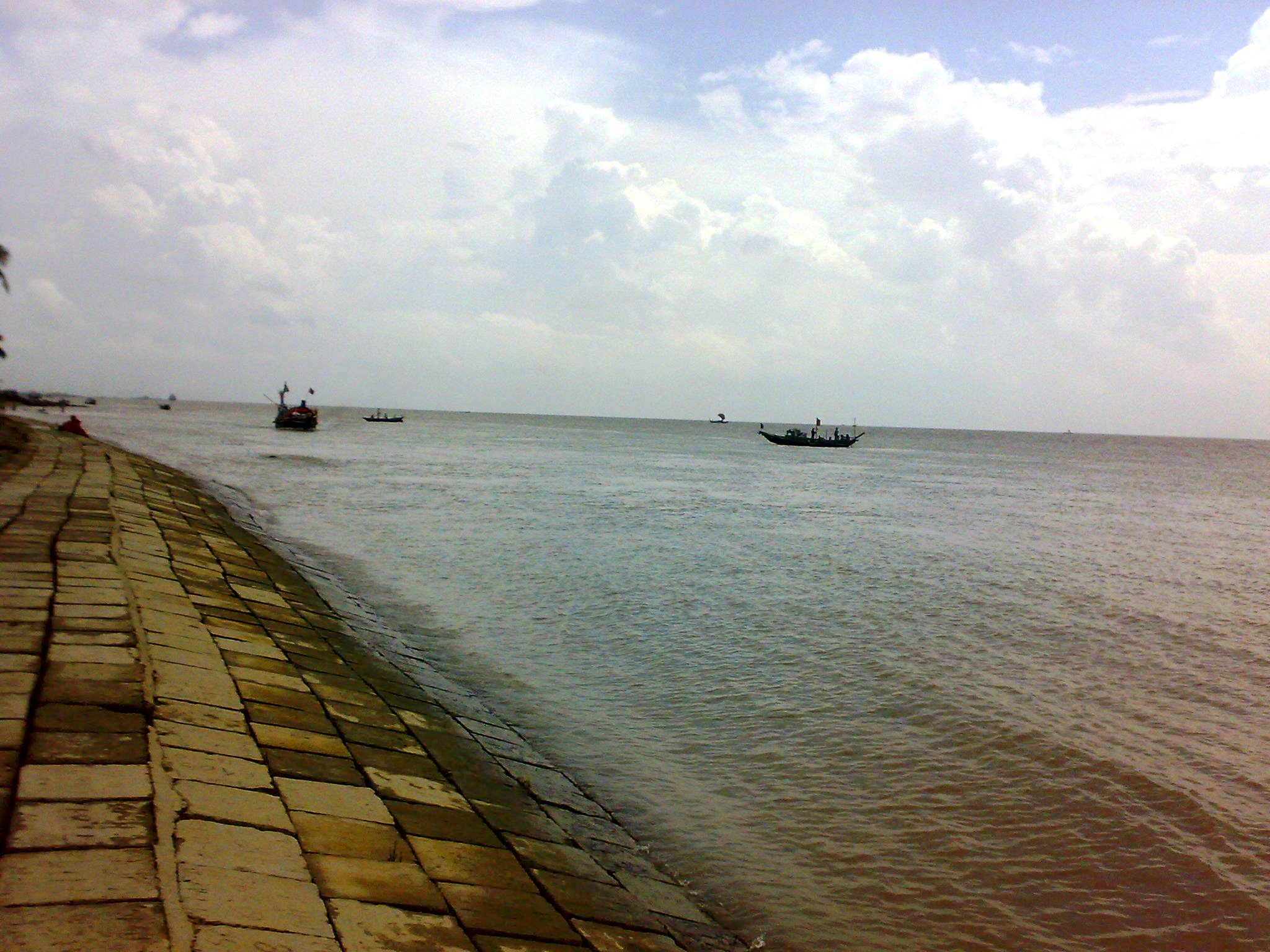
- Road from Dhaka to Lakshmipur, Tita Khan Jame Masjid, Dam near Moju Chowdhury Hat, Meghna River at Haidergang Ghat, Sunset at Char Alexander

- Interactive map of Lakshmipur / Laxmipur District
- Coordinates: 22.9500°N 90.8250°E
- Country: Bangladesh
- Division: Chittagong Division
- Subdivision: 1979
- District: 15 February 1984 (split from Noakhali)
- Headquarters: Lakshmipur

Government
  - Deputy Commissioner: S.M. Mehedi Hasan

Area
  - Total: 1,440.39 km^{2} (556.14 sq mi)

Population (2022)
  - Total: 1,937,948
  - Density: 1,345.43/km^{2} (3,484.66/sq mi)
- Demonym(s): Lakshmipuri, Laxmipuri
- Time zone: UTC+06:00 (BST)
- Postal code: 3700
- Area code: 0381
- ISO 3166 code: BD-31
- HDI (2018): 0.596 medium · 11th of 21
- Notable sport teams: NoFeL SC
- Website: www.lakshmipur.gov.bd

Lakshmipur District or Laxmipur District (Bengali: লক্ষ্মীপুর জেলা; Bengali pronunciation: [lokʰːiˈpur]) is a district in Bangladesh with an area of 1,440 km^{2}. It is bordered by Chandpur to the north, Bhola and Noakhali districts to the south, Noakhali to the east, and Barisal and Bhola districts to the west. Lakshmipur was part of Noakhali until 15 February 1984, when the western part of Noakhali was reorganised from Lakshmipur subdivision into Lakshmipur district to improve administrative efficiency.

== History ==
As with the rest of the erstwhile Noakhali district, most of the Lakshmipur area was formed relatively recently from alluvial deposits brought by the Meghna. The region was formerly under the Samatata region of ancient Bengal and later formed part of the Bhulua Kingdom, which intermittently fell under the domination of the Bengal Sultans, Tripura and Rakhine. During the 14th century, a Sufi saint called by the locals Shah Miran arrived in the district to spread Islam among the local Hindus. His dargah is in Kanchanpur village of Ramganj Upazila.

Bhulua was conquered by the Mughals in the early 17th century. In the 18th century, the East India Company took over the region and formed the district of Noakhali. The Noakhali riots began in Shyampur village of Ramganj Upazila and spread to the rest of the present district. After Partition, Lakshmipur continued to be a part of Noakhali district until 1984 when it became its own district.

== Geography ==
Lakshmipur is roughly triangular in shape. It borders Chandpur district to the north, Noakhali district to the east, and Barisal and Bhola districts across the Meghna to the southwest. The southwestern portion of the district consists of chars formed by alluvial deposits of the Meghna, which are constantly shifting in position and size. There are very few major rivers, the two biggest being the Meghna and Dakatia. The Meghna forms the southwestern border of the district and is very wide.

The chars in the Meghna are made up of alluvial deposits that, after a few months, begin growing grass and trees and become suitable for cultivation. Most of present-day Lakshmipur district was created in the last century by the gradual merging of chars with the mainland. The terrain is flat and is mostly cultivated fields with pockets of forest cover.

== Administration ==
Lakshmipur District upazila geocode map

The district of Lakshmipur consists of four municipalities, 58 union parishads, 514 villages, 3,539 mosques, 45 temples, and one church.

The upazilas or subdivisions under this district are:

- Lakshmipur Sadar Upazila
- Ramganj Upazila
- Raipur Upazila
- Ramgati Upazila
- Kamalnagar Upazila

=== Police stations ===
There are six police stations in Lakshmipur.

1. Lakshmipur Model Thana
2. Ramganj Thana
3. Raipur Thana
4. Ramgati Thana
5. Kamalnagar Thana
6. Chandragonj Thana

== Demographics ==
Historical population
| Year | Pop. | ±% p.a. |
|---|---|---|
| 1974 | 966,785 | — |
| 1981 | 1,120,260 | +2.13% |
| 1991 | 1,312,337 | +1.60% |
| 2001 | 1,489,901 | +1.28% |
| 2011 | 1,729,188 | +1.50% |
| 2022 | 1,937,948 | +1.04% |

According to the 2022 Census of Bangladesh, Lakshmipur District had 459,344 households and a population of 1,937,948 with an average 4.16 people per household. Among the population, 431,467 (22.26%) inhabitants were under 10 years of age. The population density was 1,345 people per km². The literacy rate (age 7 and over) in Lakshmipur was 73.98%, compared to the national average of 74.80%, and the sex ratio was 1,122 females per 1,000 males. Approximately, 24.90% of the population lived in urban areas. The ethnic population was 150.

Religions in Lakshmipur District (2022)
| Religion | Percent |
| Islam | 96.79% |
| Hinduism | 3.19% |
| Other or not stated | 0.02% |

Religion in present-day Lakshmipur District
| Religion | 1941 (Note: 1941 figures use Ramganj, Raipur, Lakshmipur and Ramgati thanas of erstwhile Noakhali district. District and thana (now Upazila) borders have shifted slightly since. As Ramganj was divided into Ramganj and Chatkhil upazilas in 1984, current population ratios have been used to estimate the 1941 population of the current Chatkhil upazila and religious distributions inside thanas were assumed to be homogenous.) | | 1981 | | 1991 | | 2001 | | 2011 | | 2022 | |
| Religion | Pop. | % | Pop. | % | Pop. | % | Pop. | % | Pop. | % | Pop. | % |
|---|---|---|---|---|---|---|---|---|---|---|---|---|
| Islam | 515,846 | 85.65% | 1,056,203 | 94.28% | 1,250,433 | 95.28% | 1,431,870 | 96.11% | 1,669,495 | 96.55% | 1,875,790 | 96.79% |
| Hinduism | 86,400 | 14.34% | 63,690 | 5.69% | 61,196 | 4.66% | 57,682 | 3.87% | 59,417 | 3.44% | 61,846 | 3.19% |
| Others (Note: Including Christianity, Buddhism, or not stated) | 60 | 0.01% | 367 | 0.03% | 708 | 0.06% | 349 | 0.02% | 276 | 0.01% | 312 | 0.02% |
| Total population | 602,306 | 100% | 1,120,260 | 100% | 1,312,337 | 100% | 1,489,901 | 100% | 1,729,188 | 100% | 1,937,948 | 100% |

As of the 2011 census, 96.55% of the population were Muslims and 3.44% were Hindus. The Hindu population decreased slightly from 64,000 in 1981 to 59,000 in 2011, but increased to 62,000 in 2022.

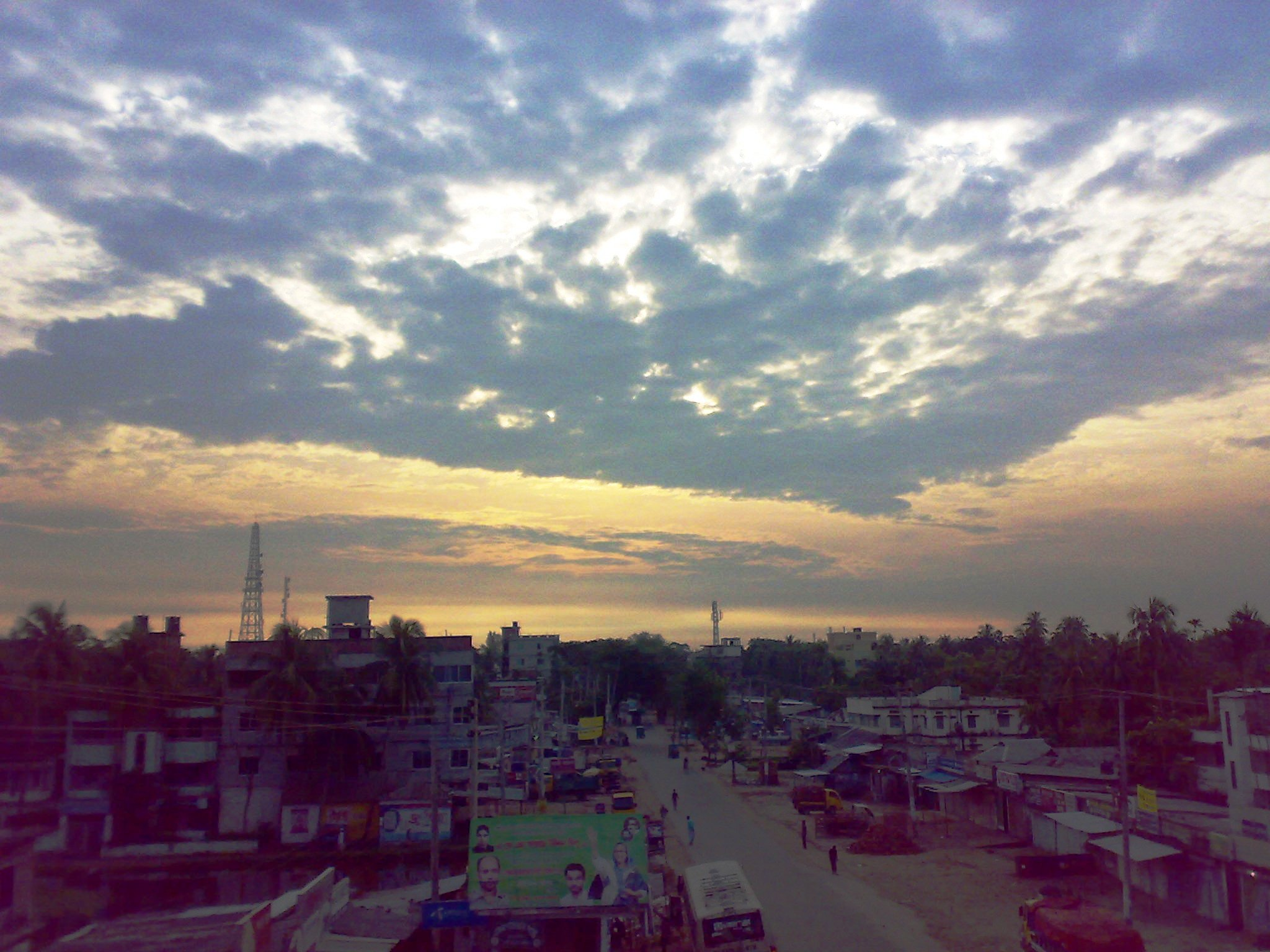
A road from Lakshmipur to Dhaka at dawn

== Education ==
- Lakshmipur Government College (The highest educational institution for higher studies in the district)
- Lakshmipur Adarsha Samad Government High School (Known as District High School of Lakshmipur)

== Notable people ==
- Mohammad Mohammadullah, 3rd President of Bangladesh
- Nishat Majumdar, first Bangladeshi woman to climb Mount Everest
- Abdul Matin Chowdhury, 14th vice-chancellor of the University of Dhaka
- A. N. M. Momtaz Uddin Choudhury, first vice-chancellor of Islamic University, Bangladesh
- Abdul Mannan, MP for Lakshmipur-4
- Abul Khair Bhuiyan, former MP for Lakshmipur-2
- A.K.M. Shahjahan Kamal, former Minister of Civil Aviation and Tourism
- A. N. M. Shamsul Islam, former MP for Lakshmipur-1
- A. S. M. Abdur Rab, politician and founder of the Jatiya Samajtantrik Dal-JSD
- Chowdhury Khurshid Alam, former MP for Lakshmipur-2
- Ghulam Sarwar Hussaini, politician and former Pir of Dayra Sharif, Shyampur
- Hafezzi Huzur, founder of the Bangladesh Khilafat Andolan
- Harunur Rashid, former MP for Lakshmipur-2
- Husne Ara Shahed, author and writer
- Khairul Enam, former MP for Lakshmipur-3
- M. A. Awal, former MP for Lakshmipur-1
- Mohammad Noman, Jatiya Party politician
- Mohammad Shahid Islam, MP for Lakshmipur-2
- Mohammad Toaha, activist in the Bengali language movement and politician
- M. M. Ruhul Amin, 16th Chief Justice of Bangladesh
- Muhammad Abdullah, academic
- Nazim Uddin Ahmed, former MP for Lakshmipur-1
- Selina Parvin, journalist and poet
- Shahiduddin Chowdhury Annie, former MP for Lakshmipur-3
- S. I. M. Nurunnabi Khan, writer and freedom fighter
- Syed Abul Kalam Azad, former treasurer of the University of Dhaka
- Tofail Ahmed, folk researcher
- Tufail Mohammad, Punjabi military officer and second recipient of the Nishan-e-Haider
- Ziaul Haque Zia, former MP for Lakshmipur-1
- Hasan Mahmud (cricketer), cricketer for Bangladesh National Team
- Riman Zahir Chowdhury Ananda (Pilot),

== See also ==
- Upazilas of Bangladesh
- Districts of Bangladesh
- Divisions of Bangladesh
- Upazila
- Thana
