= Mohammad Noman (politician) =

Bangladeshi politician

Mohammad Noman is a political leader of the Jatiya Party in Bangladesh. He was elected a member of parliament from the Lakshmipur-2 constituency in the 2014 national election.
