= Ramganj Upazila =

Ramganj রামগঞ্জ
- Upazila
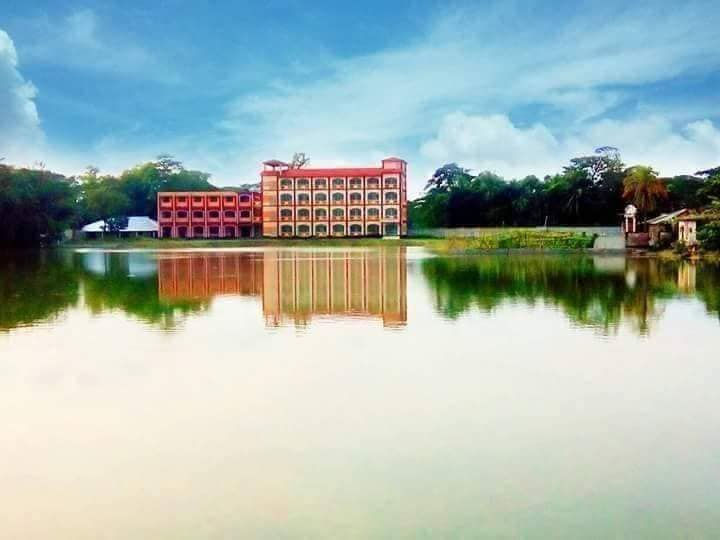
- Dalta Degree College, Ramganj

- Coordinates: 23°6.3′N 90°52.5′E
- Country: Bangladesh
- Division: Chittagong
- District: Lakshmipur
- Capital: Ramganj Municipality

Government
  - MP (Lakshmipur-1): Shahadat Hossain Selim
  - Upazila Chairman: Munir Hussain Chowdhury

Area
  - Total: 169.31 km^{2} (65.37 sq mi)

Population (2022)
  - Total: 313,225
  - Density: 1,850.0/km^{2} (4,791.5/sq mi)
- Demonym: Ramganjo
- Time zone: UTC+6 (BST)
- Postal code: 3720
- Area code: 0381
- Website: ramganj.lakshmipur.gov.bd

Ramganj Upazila mauza geocode map

Ramganj (Bengali: রামগঞ্জ, romanized: Ramgônj) is an upazila of Lakshmipur District in the Division of Chittagong, Bangladesh. The seat lies at Ramganj town, which is 121 kilometres (75 mi) by road southeast of Dhaka.

== History ==
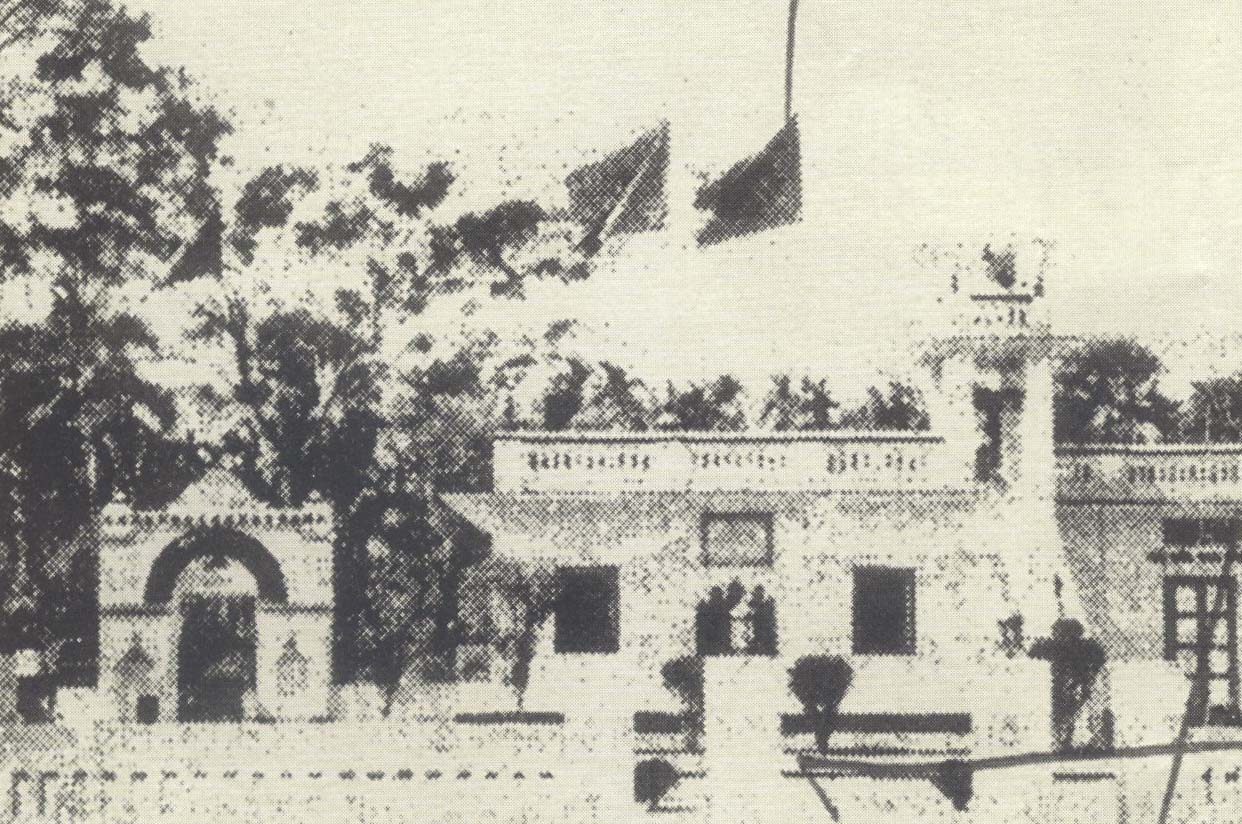
Dayra Sharif in Shyampur

This area was home to an influential Hindu religious leader by the name of Ram after who Ramganj was named after. The Nagmud Madrasa was founded in Ramganj in 1856. In 1891, a thana (police outpost) was established in Ramganj. The Noakhali riots spread to Ramganj on 10 October 1946, and led to heavy casualties for several days. In response, Mahatma Gandhi arrived from Delhi as an appeal.

During the Bangladesh Liberation War of 1971, the Pakistan Army and their collaborators set up camps in Ramganj Godown, Dakbungalow and Ramganj MU High School, and plundered villages in Ramganj. Some of these soldiers were murdered whilst battling against Bengali freedom fighters in Dighir Par, Fatehpur. The army later kidnapped 14 freedom fighters, butchering them in their camp at Ramganj. Mass killings were also conducted near the Madrasa of Hajirhat Kalakopa. On 24 March 1983, Ramganj Thana was upgraded to an upazila as part of the President of Bangladesh Hussain Muhammad Ershad's decentralisation project.

== Demographics ==
Religions in Ramganj Upazila (2022)
Religion	Percent
Islam	96.54%
Hinduism	3.45%

According to the 2022 Bangladeshi census, Ramganj Upazila had 74,298 households and a population of 313,225. 10.73% of the population were under 5 years of age. Ramganj had a literacy rate (age 7 and over) of 82.90%: 83.28% for males and 82.60% for females, and a sex ratio of 81.18 males for every 100 females. 73,763 (23.55%) lived in urban areas.

According to the 2011 Census of Bangladesh, Ramganj Upazila had 59,285 households and a population of 285,686. 68,432 (23.95%) were under 10 years of age. Ramganj had a literacy rate (age 7 and over) of 64.2%, compared to the national average of 51.8%, and a sex ratio of 1188 females per 1000 males. 44,775 (15.67%) lived in urban areas.

== Administration ==
Ramganj Upazila is divided into Ramganj Municipality and ten union parishads: Bhadur, Bhatra, Bholakot, Chandipur, Darbeshpur, Icchapur, Kanchanpur, Karpara, Lamchar, and Noagaon. The union parishads are subdivided into 122 mauzas and 134 villages.

Ramganj Municipality is subdivided into 9 wards and 18 mahallas.

== Education and facilities ==
Ramganj has an average literacy rate of 57.3%, 12.6 percentage points above the national average of 32.4%. It is home to 37 madrasas namely Nagmud Madrasa, Hajirhat Kalakopa Madrasa and Kethuri Senior Madrasa. There are 432 mosques in Ramganj and some include the Great Mosque of Sonapur, the Registry Office Mosque, Dakbungalow Mosque, the Great Mosque of Fatehpur and the Dayra Sharif Mosque in Shyampur.

== Economy and tourism ==
Ramganj is home to several historic dargahs in Kachua, Kanchanpur (Shah Miran) and Harris Char. It is home to natural gas and mainly exports iron stationery, shital Pati, oranges, betel nuts and coconuts.

== Notable people ==
- ATM Shamsuzzaman – film and television actor, director and screen-playwright.
- Ghulam Sarwar Hussaini – politician and former Pir of Dayra.
- Mahfuz Alam – Special Assistant to the Chief Adviser of Bangladesh.
- Mahfuz Ahmed – television actor.
- Nishat Majumdar – first Bangladeshi woman to scale Mount Everest.
- Nazim Uddin Ahmed – former MP for Lakshmipur-1.
- S I M Nurunnabi Khan – freedom fighter.
- Ziaul Haque Zia – former MP for Lakshmipur-1 and State Minister.

== See also ==
- Asharkota
