= Lakshmipur Sadar Upazila =

Lakshmipur / Laxmipur লক্ষ্মীপুর সদর
- Upazila
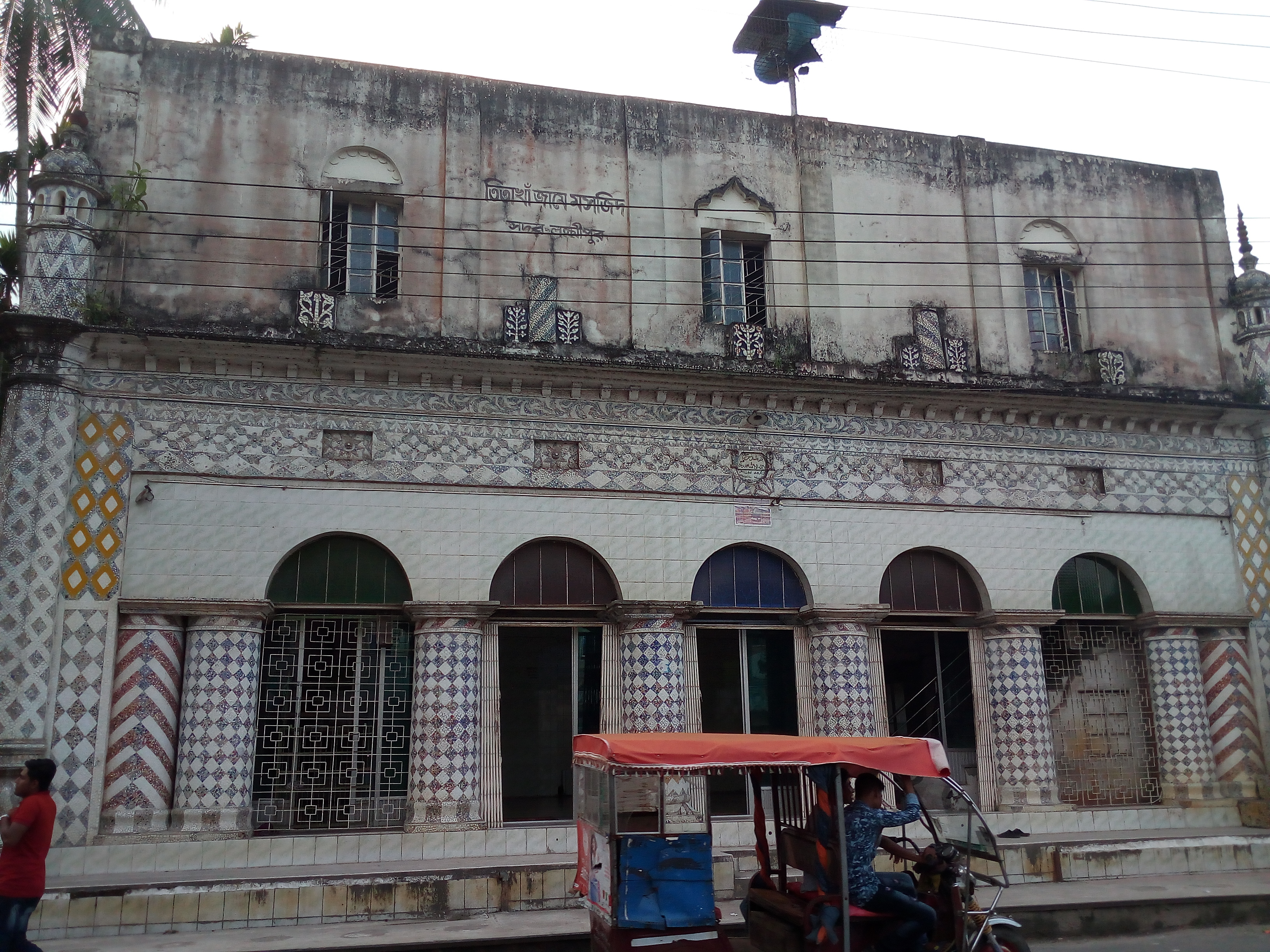
- Tita Khan Jame Masjid

- Coordinates: 22°57′N 90°49.5′E
- Country: Bangladesh
- Division: Chittagong
- District: Lakshmipur
- Headquarters: Lakshmipur

Area
  - Total: 480.35 km^{2} (185.46 sq mi)

Population (2022)
  - Total: 814,847
  - Density: 1,696.4/km^{2} (4,393.6/sq mi)
- Time zone: UTC+6 (BST)
- Postal code: 3700
- Area code: 0381
- Website: Official Map of Lakshmipur Sadar

Lakshmipur Sadar Upazila mauza geocode map

Lakshmipur or Laxmipur Sadar (Bengali: লক্ষ্মীপুর সদর) is an upazila of Lakshmipur District in Chittagong Division, Bangladesh.

== Geography ==
Lakshmipur Sadar is located at 22.9500°N 90.8250°E. It has a total area of 514.78 km^{2}. Most of the land in Lakshmipur district is river bed or isles sedimented from the river or the Bay of Bengal, the names of different areas of the district are named adding suffixes like 'Chor', 'Dee', 'Di', 'Dia'- meaning river bed.

== Demographics ==
Historical population
Year	Pop. (000)	±%
1981	489	—
1991	525	+7.4%
2001	575	+9.5%
2011	684	+19.0%
2022	815	+19.2%
Source: Bangladesh Bureau of Statistics

Religions in Lakshmipur Sadar Upazila (2022)
Religion	Percent
Islam	96.65%
Hinduism	3.33%
Other or not stated	0.02%

According to the 2022 Bangladeshi census, Lakshmipur Sadar Upazila had 192,831 households and a population of 814,847. 11.04% of the population were under 5 years of age. Lakshmipur Sadar had a literacy rate (age 7 and over) of 75.46%: 75.55% for males and 75.38% for females, and a sex ratio of 89.02 males for every 100 females. 180,251 (22.12%) lived in urban areas.

According to the 2011 Census of Bangladesh, Lakshmipur Sadar Upazila had 144,228 households and a population of 684,425. 172,979 (25.27%) were under 10 years of age. Lakshmipur Sadar had a literacy rate (age 7 and over) of 51.9%, compared to the national average of 51.8%, and a sex ratio of 1104 females per 1000 males. 86,286 (12.61%) lived in urban areas.

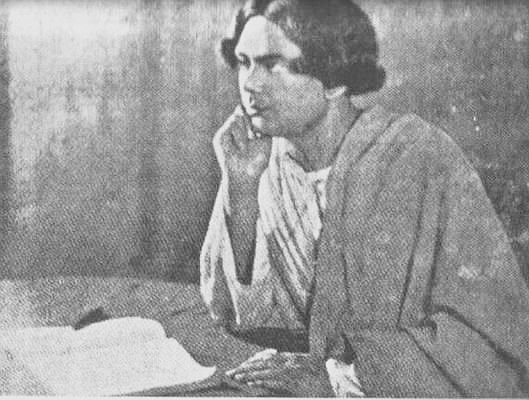
Kazi Nazrul Islam visited Lakshmipur Sadar in 1927.

== Administration ==
Lakshmipur Sadar Upazila is divided into Lakshmipur Municipality and 19 union parishads: Bangakha, Basikpur, Bhabaniganj, Chandraganj, Char Ruhita, Charramani Mohan, Charshahi, Dakshin Hamchadi, Dalal Bazar, Datta Para, Dighali, Hajir Para, Kushakhali, Laharkandi, Mandari, Parbati Nagar, Shak Char, Uttar Hamchadi, and Uttar Joypur. The union parishads are subdivided into 226 mauzas and 258 villages.

Lakshmipur Municipality was established in 1976. It is subdivided into 12 wards and 22 mahallas.

== Transport ==
- Moju Chowdhury Hat, transport hub

== Education ==
- Lakshmipur Adarsha Samad Government High School

== See also ==
- Districts of Bangladesh
- Divisions of Bangladesh
- Upazilas of Bangladesh
- Thanas of Bangladesh
- Union Councils of Bangladesh
