= Government Nazrul College =

Public university in Bangladesh

- সরকারি নজরুল কলেজ
- Former name: Nazrul College Trishal
- Type: Public
- Established: 1967
- Academic affiliations: National University, Bangladesh
- Chancellor: President of Bangladesh
- Vice-Chancellor: Harun-or-Rashid
- Principal: Md. Mojibur Rahman
- Academic staff: 40
- Administrative staff: 30
- Students: About 3500
- Undergraduates: About 1200
- Location: Trishal, Mymensingh, 2220, Bangladesh; 24.5831049°N 90.393936°E
- Campus: Urban (3.5 Acres)
- Language: Bengali

Government Nazrul College is a government college in Trishal Upazila, Mymensingh. It was established in 1967. It is an affiliated college of National University, Bangladesh.

== History ==
Government Nazrul College was established in 1967 and was named 'Nazrul College Trishal' as a memorial for the 'National Poet of Bangladesh', Kazi Nazrul Islam's appearance in Trishal. In 1970, the college was upgraded to graduation (degree) class and locally known as Nazrul College or Nazrul Degree College. On August 12, 2018, the college was nationalised by the Ministry of Education (Bangladesh).

== See More ==
- Trishal Upazila
- Jatiya Kabi Kazi Nazrul Islam University
