= Shahabuddin Degree College =

Higher education institution in Bangladesh

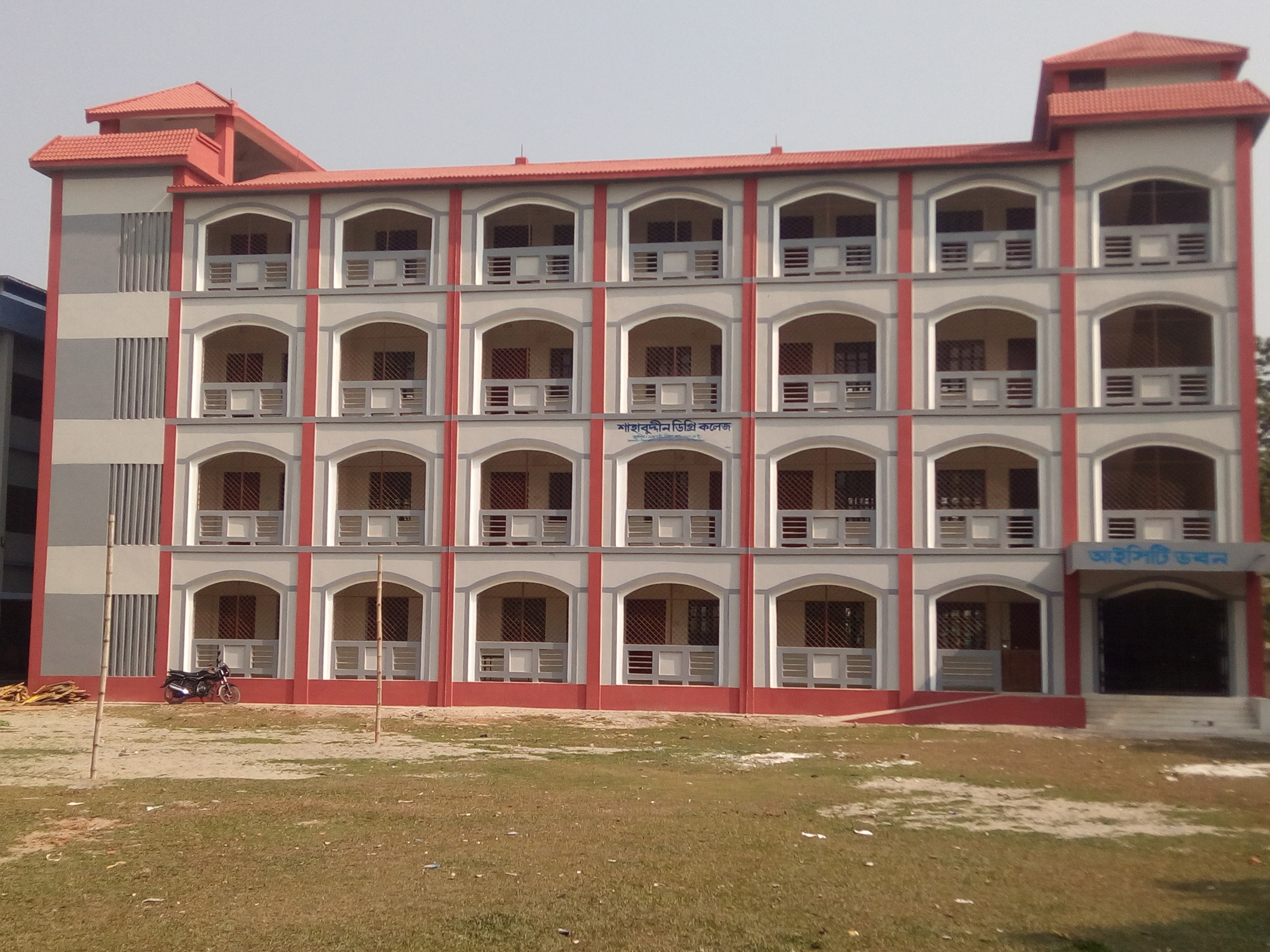
- Main building
- Type: College
- Established: 1987
- Founders: Maulvi Shahabuddin Ahmed
- Affiliations: National University, Bangladesh
- President: Upazila Executive Officer
- Principal: Maqbool Hossain
- Administrative staff: 40
- Students: 4000
- Location: Fulbaria, Mymensingh, Bangladesh; 24.5322560°N 90.2807599°E
- Campus: 13 acres (5.3 ha)
- Website: www.shahabuddincollege.edu.bd

Shahabuddin Degree College (Bengali: শাহাবুদ্দীন ডিগ্রী কলেজ) is a higher education institution located in Fulbaria, Mymensingh, Bangladesh established in 1987. It belongs to Bangladesh National University.

== History ==
This college was established in 1987. Politicians Maulvi Shahabuddin Ahmed established the college in The Assim, Fulbaria of Mymensingh district.

Then The MP Habib Ullah Sarkar made a special contribution to the mpo of the college.

From the academic year 2004–05, the Business Management (BM) branch was started in the college. The college was upgraded to a degree level from the academic year 2009–10.

In 2015, the present member of parliament Moslem Uddin established an HSC examination centre in the college.

== description ==
The college is named after its founder Maulvi Shahabuddin Ahmed.

== Infrastructure ==
The college has an area of 13 acres (5.3 ha). At present, Shahabuddin Degree College has a total of two education buildings, a mosque and a food house.

== Degrees ==
The college gives degree in the following subjects:

=== BSS ===
- Political science
- Sociology
- History

=== Graduate Class ===
- Bengali
- General English
- History

=== Higher Secondary ===
- Science
- Human
- Business education
- Business management (BM)

== Gallery ==
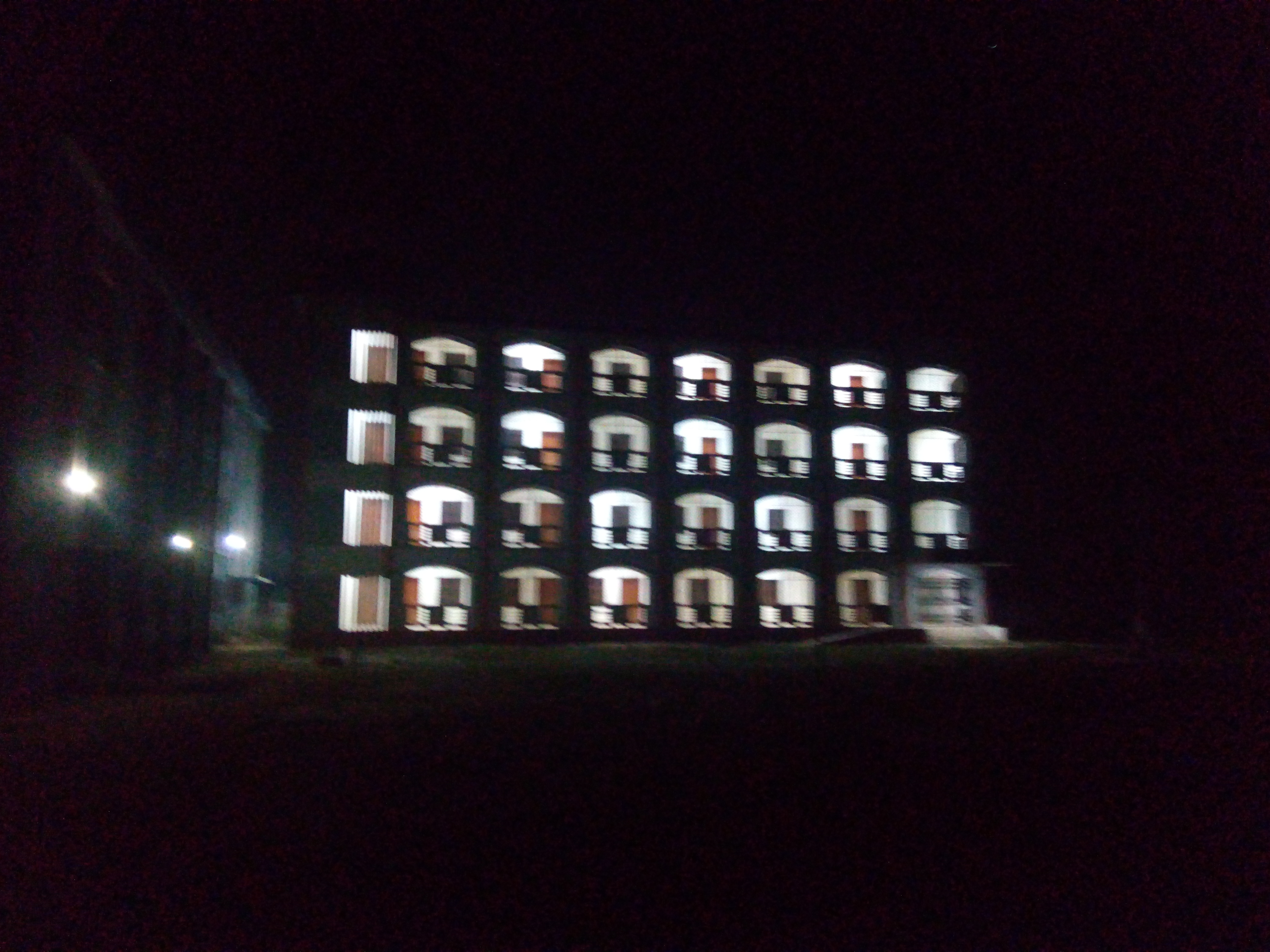
Main building during night time

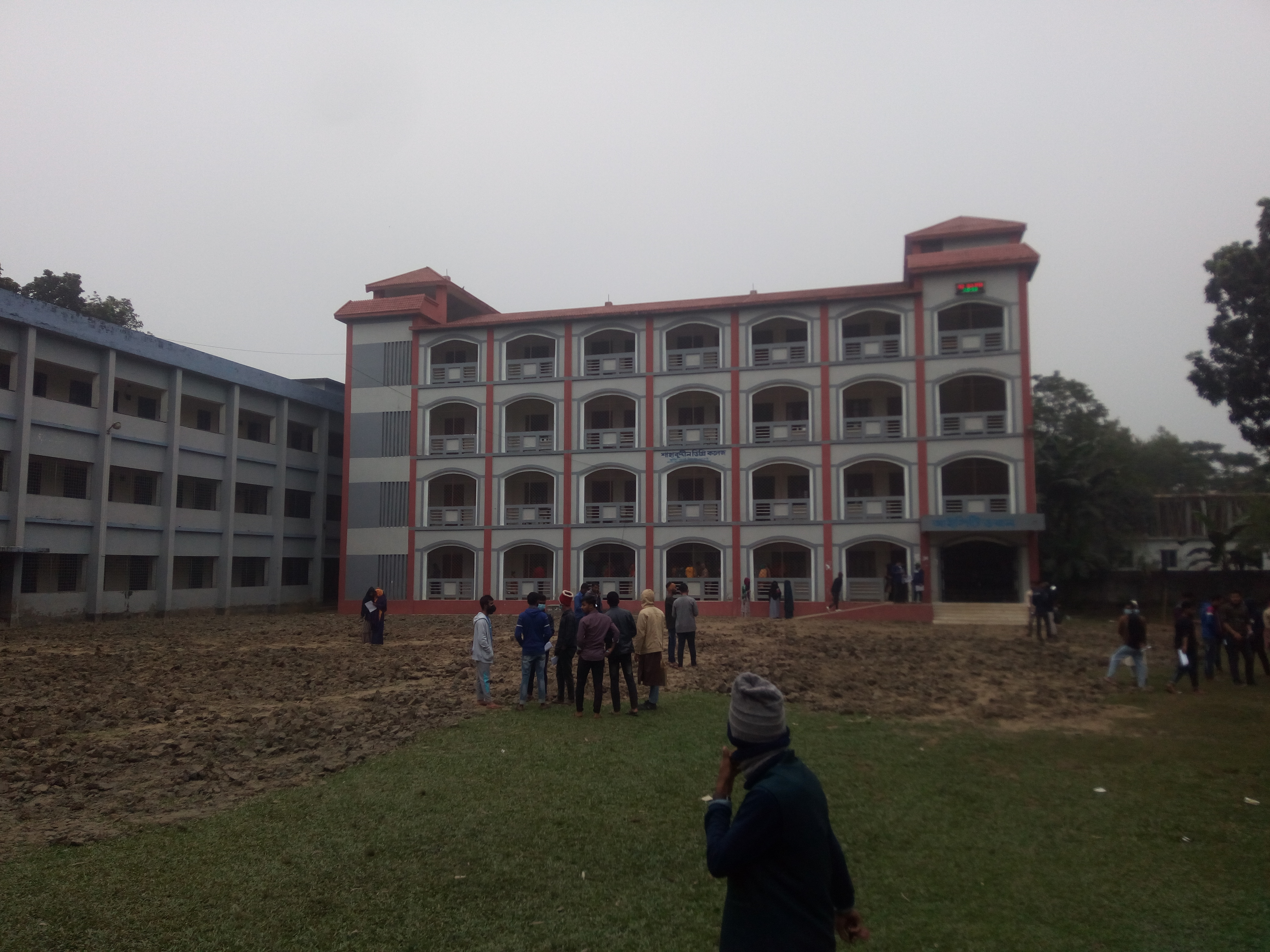
Main Playground

== See also ==
- Begum Fazilatunnecha Mujib Government Mohila College
- Shamsuddin Ahmed (engineer)
