= Why There Are No Noyontara Flowers In Agargaon Colony: Stories =

- Cover of first edition, 2022
- Author: Shahidul Zahir
- Translator: V. Ramaswami
- Language: English
- Genre: Short story collection
- Published: 5 September 2022
- Publisher: Harper Perennial
- Publication place: India
- Media type: Print (paperback)
- Pages: 280
- ISBN: 9789356290327
- OCLC: 1358404455

Why There Are No Noyontara Flowers In Agargaon Colony: Stories is a collection of short stories by Bangladeshi novelist Shahidul Zahir. It was translated from Bengali to English by Indian translator V. Ramaswami. The collection was published on 5 September 2022 by Harper Perennial. The book received mixed reviews after its publication. Indian poet and writer Jerry Pinto has described it as "unforgettable".

The name of the collection is derived from the 1991 short story "Agargaon Colony-te Nayantara Phul Keno Nei", which was published in the short story collection Dumur Kheko Manush O Annanya Galpo (1999). The anthology consists of ten short stories, six of which are taken from Dumur Kheko Manush O Annanya Galpo and four from the collection Dolu Nadir Hawa O Annanya Galpo (2004).

== Stories ==
No.	English title	Original title	Year	Published
1	"Where Is My Heart's Wanderer"	"Kothay Pabo Tare"	1999	Dolu Nadir Hawa O Annanya Galpo (2004)
2	"The History of Our Cottage Industry"	"Amader Kutir Shilper Itisash"	1995	Dumur Kheko Manush O Annanya Galpo (1999)
3	"The Fig-Eating Folk"	"Dumur Kheko Manush"	1992	Dumur Kheko Manush O Annanya Galpo (1999)
4	"The Breeze of the Dolu River"	"Dolu Nadir Hawa"	২০০৩	Dolu Nadir Hawa O Annanya Galpo (2004)
5	"The Woodcutter and the Ravens"	"Kathur-e O Darkaak"	1992	Dumur Kheko Manush O Annanya Galpo (1999)
6	"The Thorn"	"Kaanta"	1995	Dumur Kheko Manush O Annanya Galpo (1999)
7	"Why There Are No Noyontara Flowers In Agargaon Colony"	"Agargaon Colony-te Nayantara Phul Keno Nei"	1991	Dumur Kheko Manush O Annanya Galpo (1999)
8	"The Chronicle of Mohammed Selim's Life"	"Ei Samay"	1993	Dumur Kheko Manush O Annanya Galpo (1999)
9	"Our Bokul"	"Amader Bakul"	২০০০	Dolu Nadir Hawa O Annanya Galpo (2004)
10	"The Monkey in the Moholla, Abdul Halim's Ma and Us"	"Mahallay Bandar, Abdu l Halimer Maa Ebong Amra"	2000	Dolu Nadir Hawa O Annanya Galpo (2004)

== Criticism ==
Debpriya Sanyal of The New Indian Express said about the title of the story collection, (the Name) explores the concept of existence, reality, as well as the relationship between man and nature, within a layered structure. Indian writer Manjula Padmanabhan said translator V. Ramaswamy "appears to have done such a painstaking job that even though the words are in English, the fragrance of the writing remains Bengali."

Siddhartha Deb stated this "haunting and apocalyptic … a literature of the future". Rakhchanda Jalil of The Wire described it as "short, pithy, compact … unsettling the present and casting a dark shadow on the future". On the other hand, writer Somak Ghoshal from Mint newspaper said: (it is) "a rare gift … Zahir synthesizes hard-hitting social realism with a surge of surrealist paranoia to forge a style that keeps the reader on tenterhooks."

According to Frontline magazine, the ten stories in the anthology go beyond the boundaries of language and storytelling and blend folklore, oral storytelling traditions, and magical realism with a deeper understanding of socio-political realities.
