= Trishal Upazila =

Upazila in Mymensingh

Trishal ত্রিশাল
- Upazila
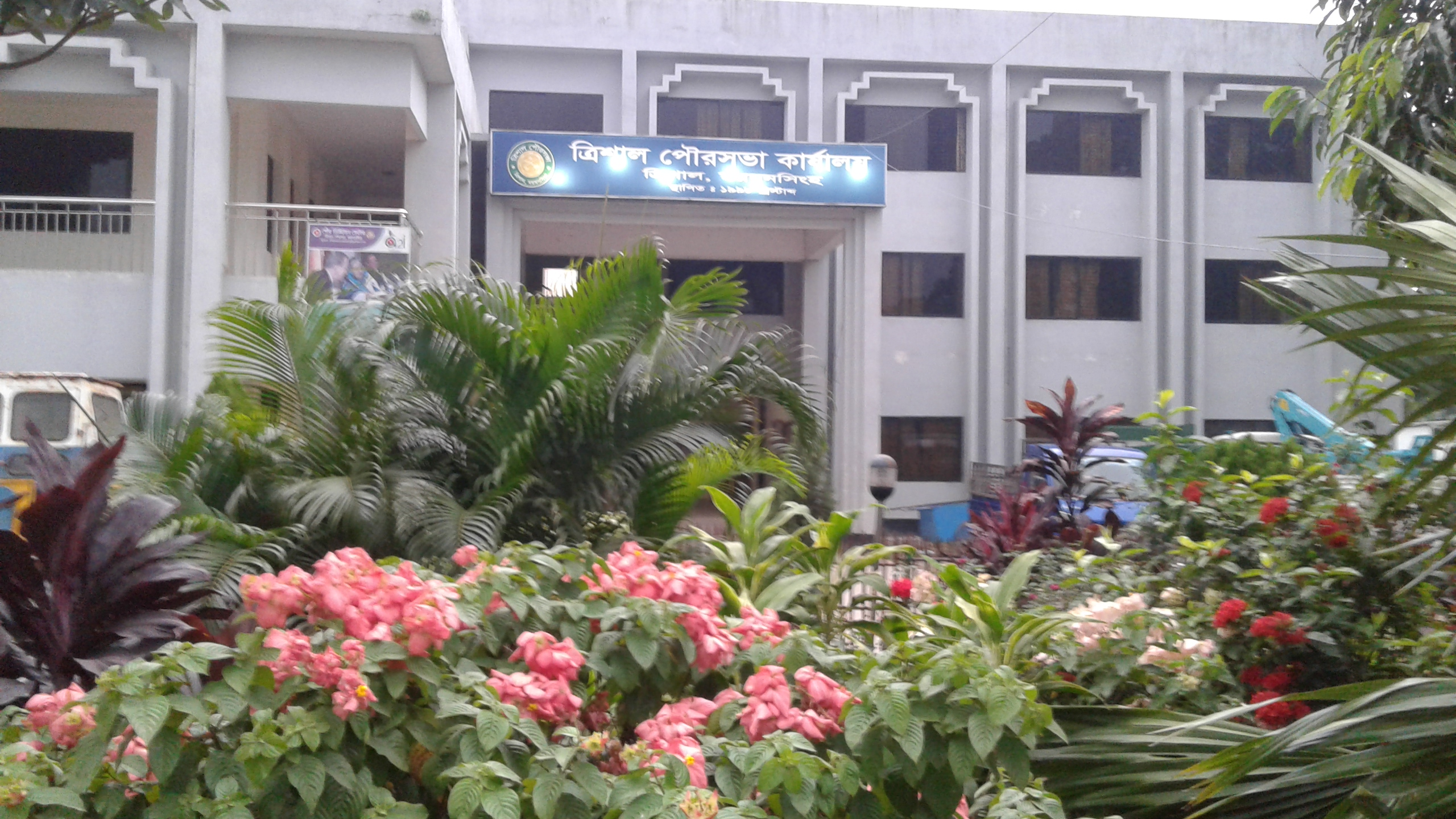
- View Of Trishal Municipality Office

- Coordinates: 24°34.5′N 90°23.5′E
- Country: Bangladesh
- Division: Mymensingh
- District: Mymensingh

Area
  - Total: 338.45 km^{2} (130.68 sq mi)

Population (2022)
  - Total: 491,483
  - Density: 1,452.2/km^{2} (3,761.1/sq mi)
- Postal code: 2220
- Area code: 09032
- Website: trishal.mymensingh.gov.bd

Trishal Upazila mauza geocode map

Trishal (Bengali: ত্রিশাল) is an upazila of Mymensingh District in the Mymensingh Division of Bangladesh. The Bengali poet Kazi Nazrul Islam attended a school here.

== Demographics ==
Historical population
| Year | Pop. | ±% |
|---|---|---|
| 1981 | 217,818 | — |
| 1991 | 336,797 | +54.6% |
| 2001 | 372,498 | +10.6% |
| 2011 | 419,308 | +12.6% |
| 2022 | 491,483 | +17.2% |
Source: Bangladesh Bureau of Statistics

Religions in Trishal Upazila (2022)
| Religion | Percent |
| Islam | 97.41% |
| Hinduism | 2.54% |
| Other or not stated | 0.05% |

According to the 2022 Bangladeshi census, Trishal Upazila had 119,144 households and a population of 491,483. 10.87% of the population were under 5 years of age. Trishal had a literacy rate (age 7 and over) of 71.44%: 72.43% for males and 70.48% for females, and a sex ratio of 98.15 males for 100 females. 58,102 (11.82%) lived in urban areas.

== Administration ==
Trishal Thana was formed in 1909 and it was turned into an upazila in 1983.

Trishal Upazila is divided into Trishal Municipality and 12 union parishads: Amirabari, Bailar, Baliparar, Dhanikhola, Harirampur, Kanihari, Kanthal, Mathbari, Mukshapur, Rampura, Sakhua, and Trishal. The union parishads are subdivided into 91 mauzas and 158 villages.

Trishal Municipality is subdivided into 9 wards and 12 mahallas.

=== Nazrul heritage sites ===
Trishal is famously known for its deep connection with the National Poet Kazi Nazrul Islam, who spent a significant part of his childhood and early education here. Notable heritage sites include:

- Nazrul Academy: A cultural institution and library established in memory of the poet to preserve his literary works.
- Darirampur High School: The school where the poet studied in class seven in 1914. It is now a prominent secondary school in the region.
- Kazir Shimla: The ancestral residence of the Kazi family where the poet stayed during his time in Trishal.

== Education ==
=== University ===
- Jatiya Kabi Kazi Nazrul Islam University, established on 1 March 2005. Its first batch class was started in June 2007.

=== Colleges ===
- Government Nazrul College
- Trishal Women's Degree College
- Trishal Women's Technical & B.M. College
- Islami Academy School & College
- Trishal Technical and B.M. College
- Aulianagar College
- Kalir Bazar School & College
- Danikhola Technical & Commercial College
- Mukshapur College
- Trishal International School & College
- Trishal Ideal School & College
- Kanthal High School & College
- Hazi Cherag Ali Degree College, Dhanikhola
- Central Technical & Business Management College, Trishal.

== Gallery ==
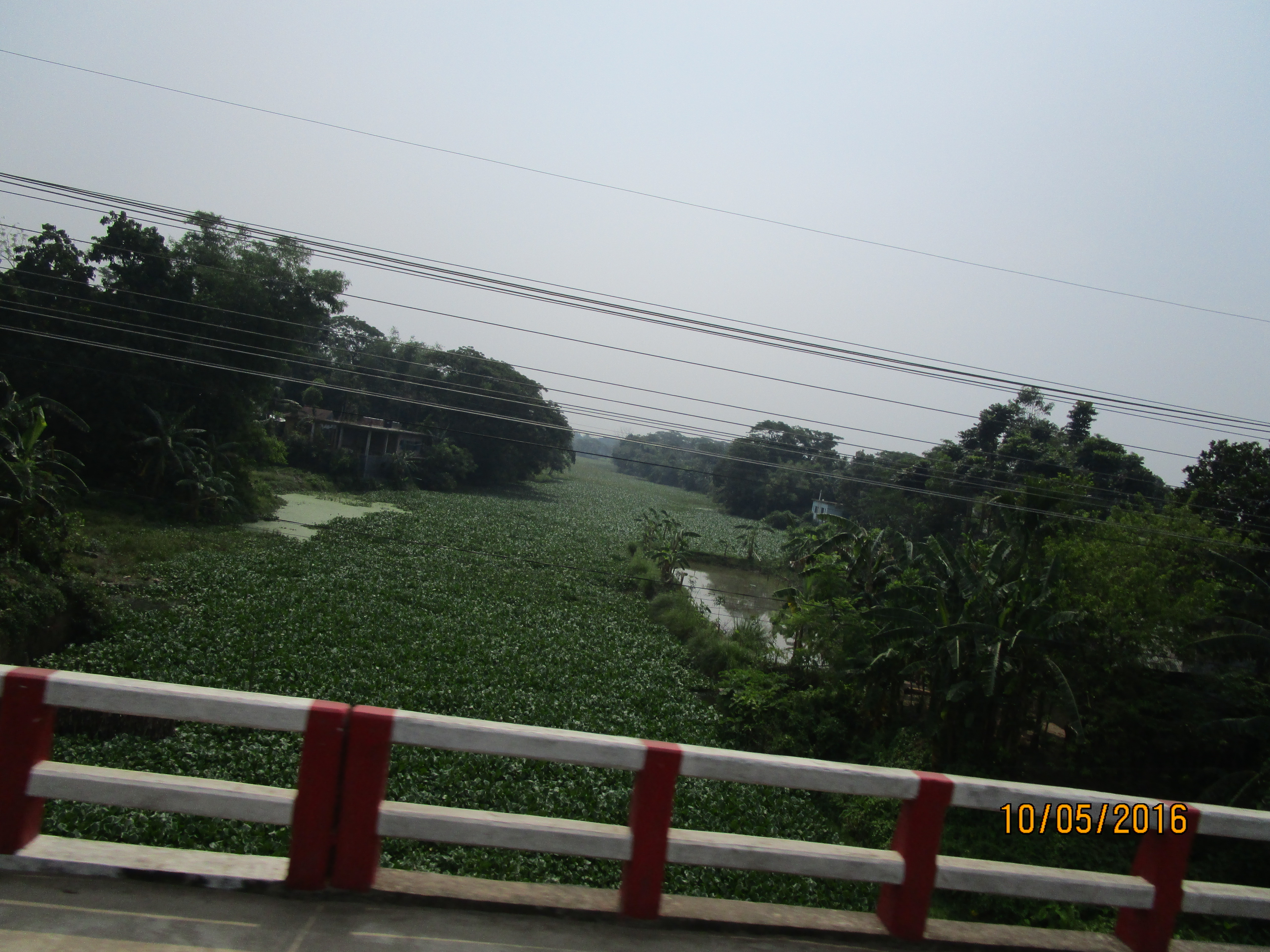
Sutia River at Trishal

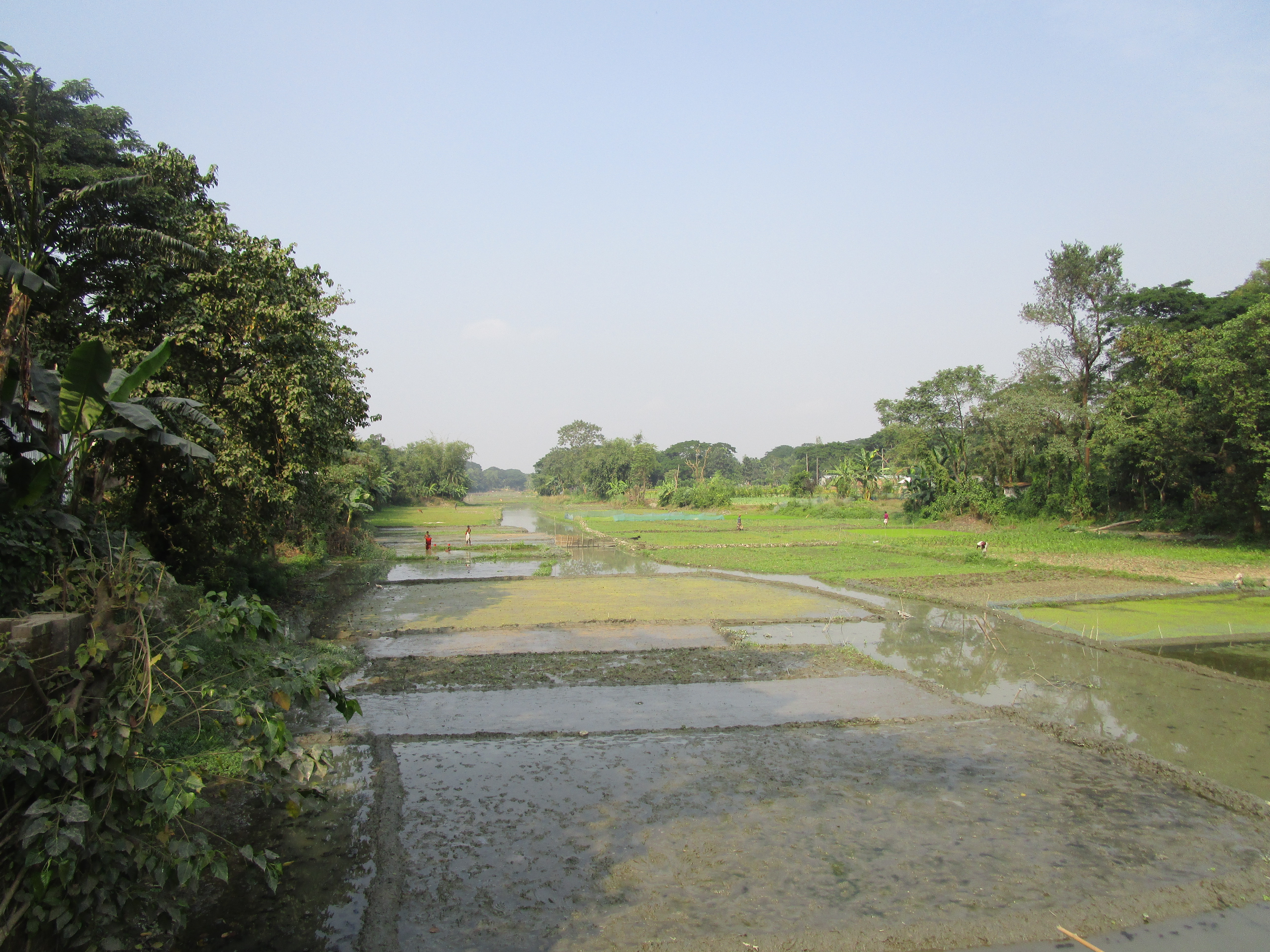
Sutia River at Dapuniya Bazar, Trishal

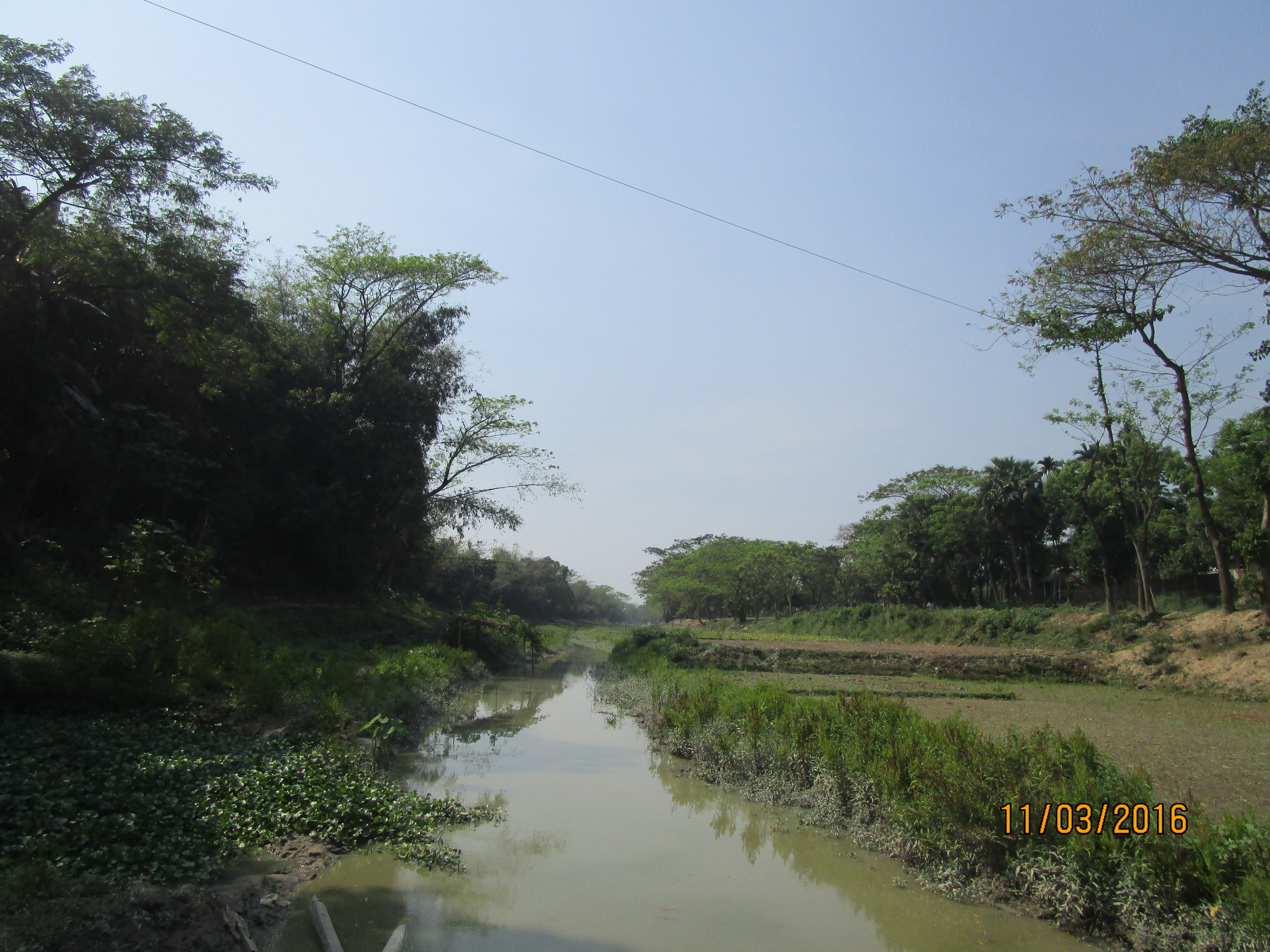
Banar River at Kashiganj, Trishal

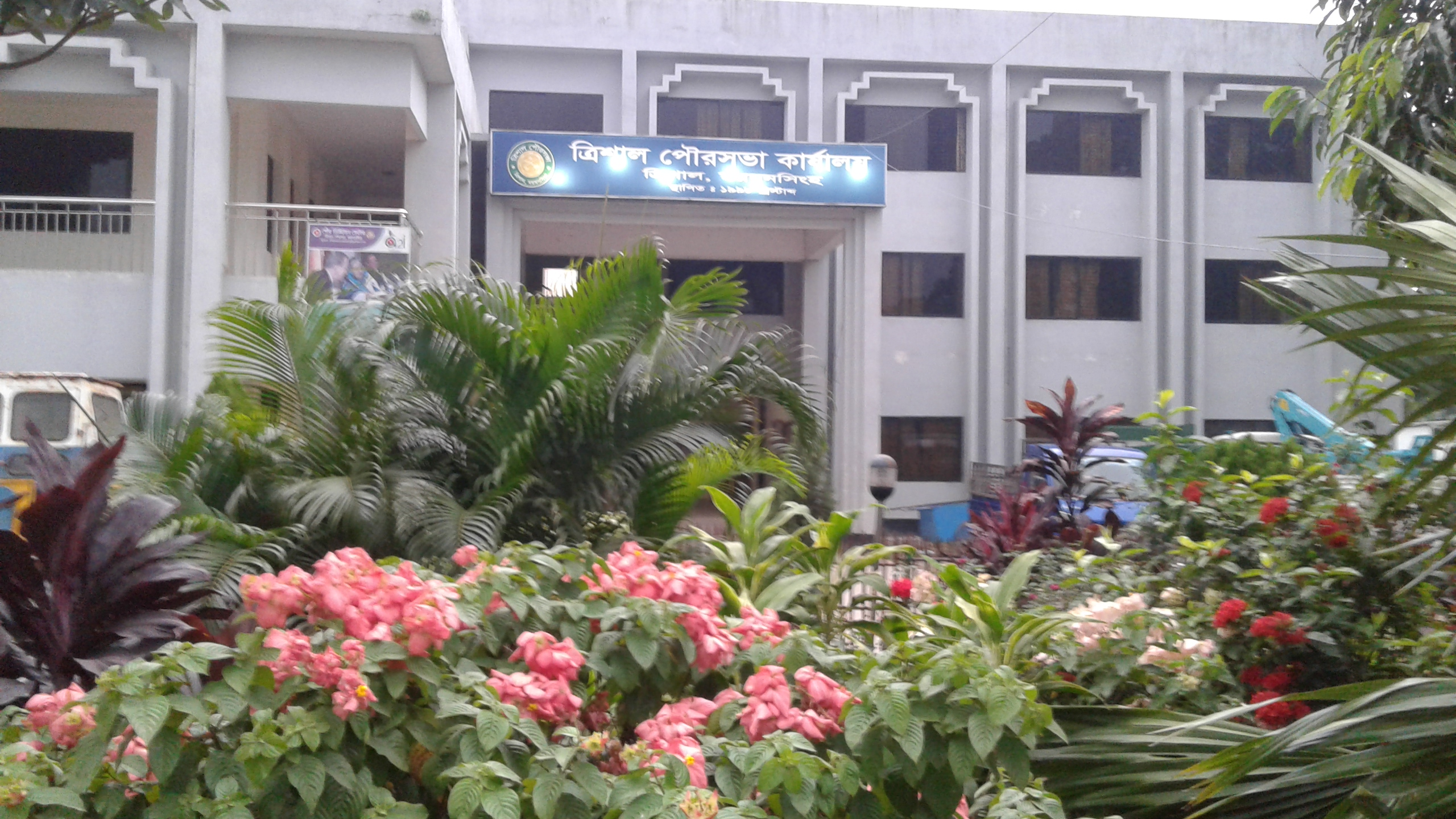
Trishal porosoba Office

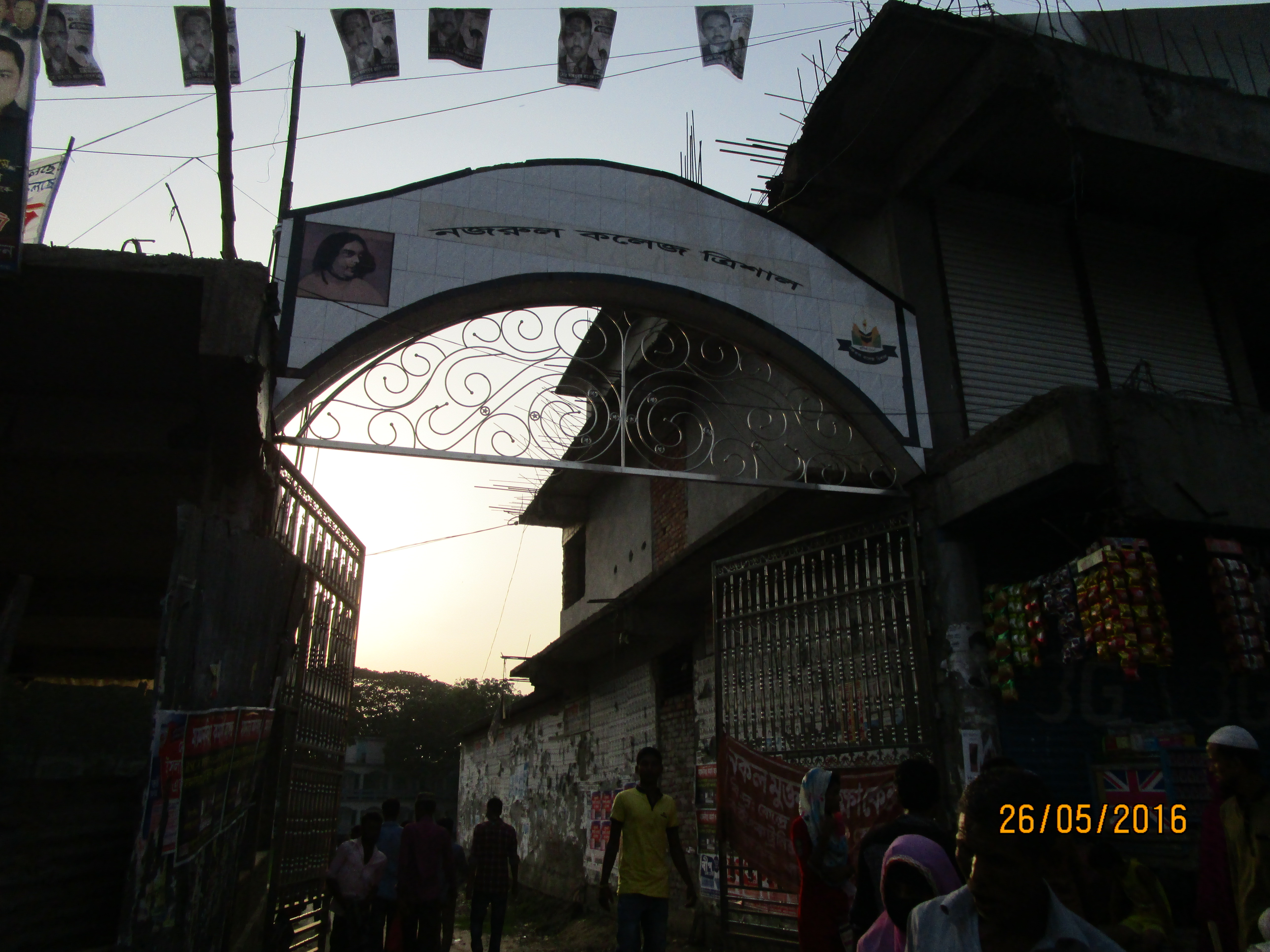
Gate Of Government Nazrul College

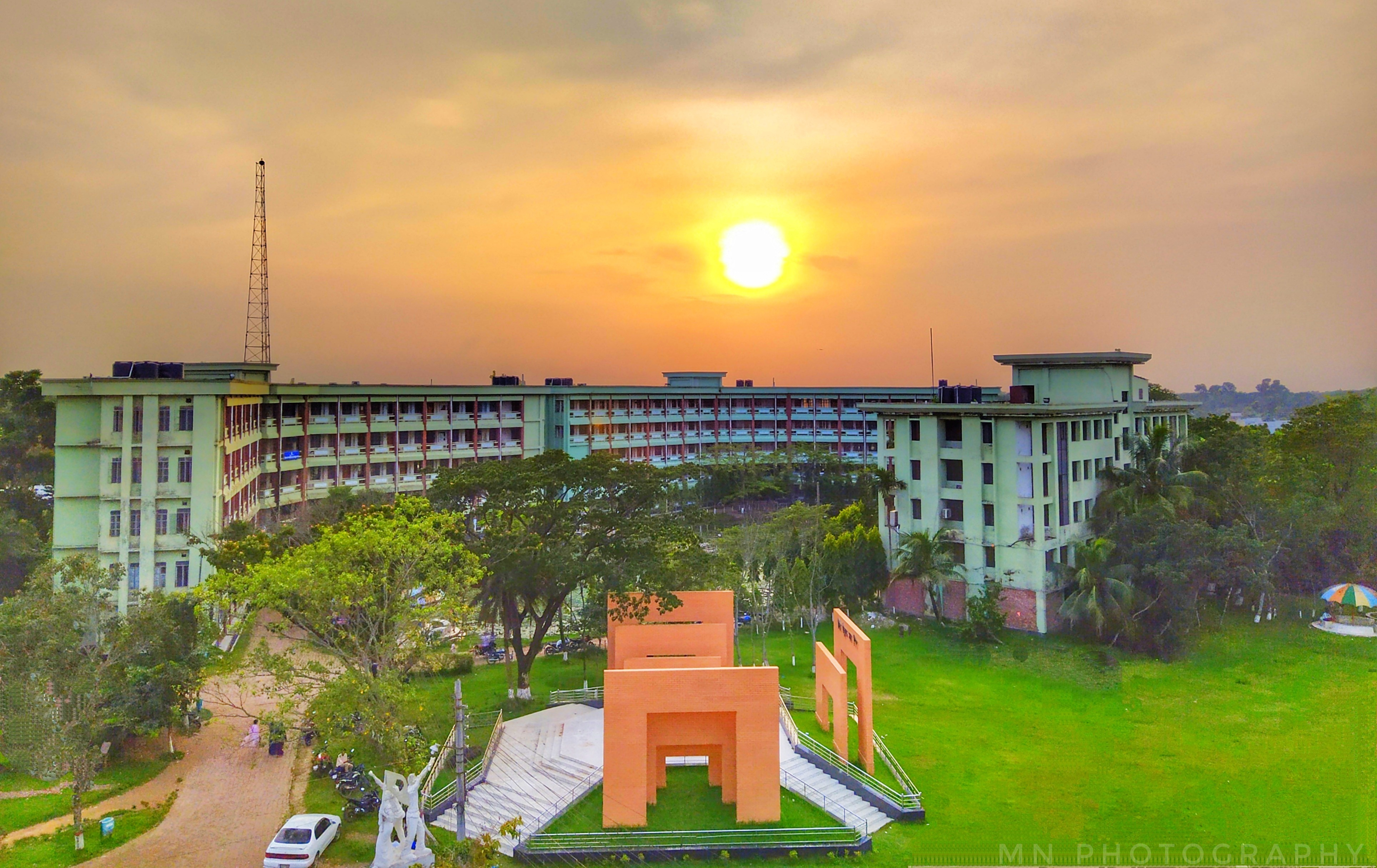
Jatiya Kabi Kazi Nazrul Islam University

== Notable residents ==
- Abul Mansur Ahmed, journalist, politician and littérateur, was born at Dhanikhola in 1898.
- Abul Kalam Shamsuddin, journalist and littérateur, was born at Trishal in 1897.
- Mahabubur Rahman Liton, physician, politician, and Member of Parliament for Mymensingh-7 (Trishal).
