= Reza Ali =

Bangladeshi politician (1940–2023)

- রেজা আলী
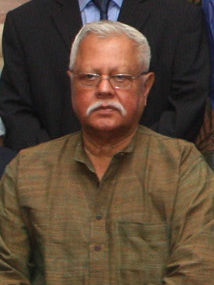
- Ali in 2012

Member of Parliament for Mymensingh-7
- In office 25 January 2009 – 24 January 2014
- Preceded by: Abdul Matin Sarkar
- Succeeded by: M. A. Hannan

Personal details
- Born: 10 April 1940 Sylhet, Assam Province, British India
- Died: 13 February 2023 (aged 82) Singapore
- Party: Bangladesh Awami League
- Parent: Tafazzal Ali (father)
- Education: Aitchison College; St. Gregory's High School
- Alma mater: University of Dhaka

Reza Ali (Bengali: রেজা আলী; 10 April 1940 – 13 February 2023) was a Bangladeshi politician, businessman and lawyer. He served as a member of the Jatiya Sangsad, representing the Awami League in the Mymensingh-7 constituency from 2009 to 2014.

== Early life ==
Ali was born on 10 April 1940 to Tafazzal Ali and Sarah Khatun Chowdhury in his maternal home in Sylhet. His father became the Minister for Health of the East Bengal government in 1947 and later the minister for revenue. He then became the minister for commerce of the-then Pakistan central government. Later, he became the ambassador of Pakistan to Egypt.

== Career ==
Ali was elected to parliament from Mymensingh-7 as a Bangladesh Awami League candidate in 2008. Ali was an entrepreneur, having pioneered the advertising industry in Bangladesh & also one of the first to enter Bangladesh's garment manufacturing and export business.

== Personal life and death ==
Ali died at Mount Elizabeth Hospital, Singapore on 13 February 2023, at the age of 82. He was married to Nayeema Ali and had three children; Miran Ali, Sarah Ali and Mishal Ali.
