= Malek Sarkar =

Bangladeshi politician

- মালেক সরকার

Member of the Bangladesh Parliament for Mymensingh-6
- In office 30 January 2024 – 6 August 2024
- Preceded by: Moslem Uddin

Personal details
- Born: 14 January 1970 (age 56)
- Party: Awami League

Abdul Malek Sarkar (born 14 January 1970) is a politician and businessman from Bangladesh. He is a former Jatiya Sangsad member representing the Mymensingh-6 constituency.

== Political life ==
Malek Sarkar was the Upazila Chairman of Fulbaria Upazila before becoming a candidate for the 2024 National Assembly elections. He elected as an independent candidate and defeated Bangladesh Awami League candidate Moslem Uddin and was elected as a member of Parliament.
