= Ujalhati =

Ujalhati উজলহাটি
- Village
- Location in Bangladesh
- Coordinates: 24°41′N 90°17′E
- Country: Bangladesh
- Division: Mymensingh Division
- District: Mymensingh District
- Upazila: Fulbaria Upazila

Population
  - Total: 1,008
- Time zone: UTC+6 (BST)

Ujalhati is a village in Fulbaria Upazila, Mymensingh District, Mymensingh Division, Bangladesh.
