= Shamsuddin Ahmed (Mymensingh politician) =

Bangladeshi politician (died 2020)

Member of Bangladesh Parliament
- In office 2001–2008
- Preceded by: Moslem Uddin
- Succeeded by: Moslem Uddin

Personal details
- Born: Mymensingh
- Died: 8 May 2020 Dhaka, Bangladesh
- Party: Independent

Shamsuddin Ahmed was an independent politician and a member of parliament for Mymensingh-6.

== Career ==
Ahmed was elected to parliament from Mymensingh-6 as an independent candidate in 2001. In 2018, he was nominated by Bangladesh Nationalist Party to contest the 11th parliamentary election.

== Death ==
Ahmed died on 8 May 2020.

== See also ==
- Shahabuddin Degree College
- Begum Fazilatunnecha Mujib Government Mohila College
