= Fulbaria Government Mohila College =

- ফুলবাড়িয়া সরকারি মহিলা মহাবিদ্যালয়
- Former names: Begum Fazilatunnecha Mujib Government Mohila College
- Established: July 17, 1999
- Founders: Moslem Uddin
- Affiliations: National University, Bangladesh
- Endowment: Government Scholarship
- Location: Fulbaria, Mymensingh, 2216; 24.6366°N 90.2642°E
- Language: Bangla

Fulbaria Government Mohila College (Bengali: ফুলবাড়িয়া সরকারি মহিলা মহাবিদ্যালয়) is a government educational institution in Fulbaria upazila of Mymensingh district, Bangladesh.

== History ==
The school was established on September 17, 1999, as a specialized educational institution for women's education by local member of parliament Moslem Uddin.

The school was named after Bangamata Begum Fazilatunnesa Mujib.

In 2018, in an official announcement, the educational institution including 301 other educational institutions, was fully nationalized.

== Awards ==
The institute was recognized as the "Best Educational Institution" at the upazila level in the college department in the National Education Week-2019.

== See more ==
- National University, Bangladesh
- Shahabuddin Degree College
