= The Independent (Bangladesh) =

English-language daily newspaper

- Type: Daily newspaper
- Format: Broadsheet
- Owner: Independent Publications Limited
- Publisher: M. Shamsur Rahman
- Editor: M. Shamsur Rahman
- Founded: 26 March 1995
- Ceased publication: 30 January 2022
- Language: English
- Headquarters: Beximco Media Complex, 149-150, Tejgaon I/A, Dhaka-1208, Bangladesh
- Website: theindependentbd.com

The Independent was an English-language daily newspaper published in Dhaka, Bangladesh. It was owned by Beximco Group of Bangladesh. The last executive editor of the newspaper was Shamim Abdullah Zahedy.

== History ==
On 26 March 1995, Beximco Group launched The Independent.

In October 2010, the Independent newspaper was relaunched.

The newspaper officially shut down on 30 January 2022. Earlier in April 2020, it ceased printed publication due to COVID-19 pandemic.

On 31 January 2022, The Independent was closed down.

== See also ==
- The Daily Ittefaq
- The Daily Star (Bangladesh)
- Daily Sun (Bangladesh)
- List of newspapers in Bangladesh
- New Age
- Prothom Alo
