= Khandaker Amirul Islam =

Bangladeshi politician

Member of Bangladesh Parliament
- In office 1991–1996
- Preceded by: Habib Ullah Sarkar
- Succeeded by: Moslem Uddin

Personal details
- Political party: Bangladesh Nationalist Party

Khandaker Amirul Islam is a Bangladesh Nationalist Party politician and a former member of parliament from Mymensingh-6.

== Career ==
Islam was elected to parliament from Mymensingh-6 as a Bangladesh Nationalist Party candidate in 1991.
