= Md. A. Khaleq =

Bangladeshi politician

Member of Bangladesh Parliament
- In office 1991–1996
- Preceded by: Anisur Rahman
- Succeeded by: Ruhul Amin Madani

Personal details
- Party: Bangladesh Nationalist Party

Md. A. Khaleq is a Bangladesh Nationalist Party politician and a former member of parliament for Mymensingh-7.

== Career ==
Khaleq was elected to parliament from Mymensingh-7 as a Bangladesh Nationalist Party candidate in 1991.
