= Abdus Salam Tarafdar =

Bangladeshi politician

Member of Bangladesh Parliament
- In office 1986–1988
- Preceded by: Abul Mansur Ahmed
- Succeeded by: Anisur Rahman

Personal details
- Party: Bangladesh Awami League

Abdus Salam Tarafdar is a Bangladesh Awami League politician and a former member of parliament for Mymensingh-7.

== Career ==
Tarafdar was elected to parliament from Mymensingh-7 as a Bangladesh Awami League candidate in 1986.
