= Mukher Dike Dekhi =

2006 novel by Shahidul Zahir

- Cover of the first edition
- Author: Shahidul Zahir
- Original title: মুখের দিকে দেখি
- Language: Bengali
- Genre: Novel
- Publisher: Mowla Brothers
- Publication date: 2006
- Publication place: Bangladesh
- Media type: print (hardcover)
- Pages: 143 (1st edition, 3rd print)
- ISBN: 9844104807
- OCLC: 71330474
- Preceded by: Se Ratey Purnima Chilo (1995)
- Followed by: Abu Ibrahimer Mirtu (2009)

Mukher Dike Dekhi (Original: মুখের দিকে দেখি) is a Bengali novel by Shahidul Zahir. It was published in Dhaka by Mowla Brothers in 2006 and was the last and 3rd published novel in his lifetime. The dedication letter of the novel reads: "pour elle / si je lui vois encore".

== Summary ==
The novel is characterized by a great variety of character traits, the narrative of which has become distinct in construction, narrative and variety.
