= Shahidul Zahir =

Bangladeshi novelist, short-story writer

- শহীদুল জহির
- Zahir
- Pronunciation
- Born: Mohammad Shaheedul Haque; 11 September 1953; Dhaka, East Bengal, Dominion of Pakistan
- Died: 23 March 2008 (aged 54); Dhaka, Bangladesh
- Burial place: Sahid Buddhijibi Kabarasthan; 23.79425°N 90.34494°E
- Other name: Shahidul Haque
- Education: MA in political science
- Alma mater: University of Dhaka; American University; University of Birmingham
- Occupations: Novelist; writer; civil servant
- Years active: 1985-2008
- Known for: Magic realism in Bengali literature
- Style: Magic realism
- Awards: See below

Shahidul Zahir (Bengali: শহীদুল জহির; born as Mohammad Shaheedul Haque, 11 September 1953 – 23 March 2008) was a Bangladeshi novelist, short story writer, and government bureaucrat. He is known for his unique practice of magical realism in modern Bengali literature. His novels and short stories have been noted for their originality of language and narrative technique. He contributed to Bengali fiction a distinct style, known as the "Shahidul Zahiriya".

He published four novels and three story collections. Abu Ibrahimer Mirtu (Abu Ibrahim's Death, 2009) is one of his notable novels, which won the Prothom Alo Book of the Year 1415 award in 2010. Also, the novels Jibon O Rajnaitik Bastobota (Life and Political Reality, 1988), Se Ratey Purnima Chilo (That Night Was the Full Moon, 1995), and Mukher Dike Dekhi (Looking to the Face, 2006) are considered to be his major contributions to Bengali literature. He has added a new dimension to Bengali short stories. His notable collections of stories are Parapar (Crossing, 1985), Dumur-kheko Manush O Annanya Galpo (Fig-Eating People and Other Stories, 1999), and Dolu Nadir Hawa O Annanya Galpo (The Wind of the Dolu River and Other Stories, 2004). His most notable stories are "Valobasha" ("Love" 1974), "Parapar" ("Crossing", 1985), "Agargaon Colonyte Nayantara Phool Keno Nei" ("Why there are no Nayantara in Agargaon Colony" 1991), "Kathure O Dardakak" ("Woodpecker and Raven", 1992), "Kanta" ("Thorn", 1995), "Choturtha Matra" ("The Fourth Dimension", 1996), "Kothaye Pab Tare" (1999), and "Dolu Nadir Hawa" ("The Wind of the Dolu River", 2003).

Zahir received the Alaol Literary Award and the Kagoz Literary Award in 2004 for his contribution to literature during his lifetime. The subject of his literary pursuits has been widely discussed. Many films, television shows, and plays have been made from his stories and novels.

== Biography ==
Mohammad Shaheedul Haque was born on 11 September 1953 at 36 Bhuter Goli (Bhojo Hari Shaha Street) of Narinda in the old part of Dhaka city. His father, AK Nural Haque, was a government officer, and his mother, Jahanara Begum, a housewife. His paternal home was in the village of Hashil in Raiganj Upazila of Sirajganj District. His grandfather Jahiruddin (it seems Shaheed took the name Jahir from his grandfather's name) was a teacher at the local Normal School (during the British period), and his grandmother was Jinnatun Nesa. They both had died long before, when his father was a child. His maternal grandparents were Azimuddin Ahmad and Hamida Begum of Amlapara, Sirajgonj Town, where he used to visit frequently on the occasion of summer holidays or Eids during his childhood along with his family members. These places, together with Fulbaria and Satkania, where he grew up, left a deep impression on his mind and in the later years featured in many of his short stories and novels.

Fictionist Zahir started his school at Silverdale KG School at the then 36 Rankin Street in Dhaka. Later he went to schools in Dhaka, Fulbaria, and Satkania, Chittagong. From Satkania Model High School he passed his SSC examination. Later he went to the Dhaka College for his pre-university course (HSC). He studied political science at Dhaka University for his bachelor's and master's degrees. He also went to the American University in Washington, D.C., and Birmingham University. He joined the Bangladesh Civil Service in 1981 as an assistant secretary. He was serving as secretary-in-charge of the Ministry of Chittagong Hill Tracts Affairs until his death in 2008.

== Literary works and style ==
Shaheedul Jahir distinguished himself with his surrealist approach to fiction. He wrote both short stories and novels. He started to write in the late 1970s. His first published story, "Bhalobasah" (tr. "Love"), clearly reflected the influence of the Bengali novelist Syed Waliullah. His first book of short stories, published in 1985, Parapar, bore his tendency to portray the human character in an intricate language in the perspective of a thin storyline. He has been said to be a magic-realist in line with Latin American writers, and Zahir has been termed the new Marquez of Bangladesh. However, he admitted the influence of two contemporary novelists, namely Syed Shamsul Haque and Akhtaruzzaman Elias, in addition to Syed Waliullah. Thematically, the storylines of a number of stories bear the influence of the Marxist paradigm. Also, in many novels and stories, he has chosen the perspective of 1971, the year of the liberation war of Bangladesh. He also translated a few stories from English.

Sometimes he wrote poetry but never published any. Also, he translated Bengali poems into English when he had leisure. Two lines from his flings at poetry are quoted below:

"... Yet we congregate once again
And a bud blooms into a flower through our time
A silvery Rupchanda floats in salty water..."
(Translated by Faizul Latif Chowdhury)

Famous places in Dhaka city like Bhuter Gali, Narinda, Dakshin Maishundi, and Agargaon are depicted in his writings as a strange new world inhabited by wonderful people. Also, villages like Suhasini and Baikunthpur, with all their dramas and mysteries, are depicted in his work.

=== Short stories ===
Parapar, a collection of short stories, was the first book by Zahir, and it was published in 1985. Although, the book went largely unnoticed. Lettre published two story collections titled Dumur-kheko Manush O Annanya Galpo (1999) and Dolu Nadir Hawa O Annanya Galpo (2004).

=== Novel ===
Jibon O Rajnaitik Bastobota, which is the first novella, of about sixty pages, and his second published book, was published in 1988. In 1995, his second novel, Se Ratey Purnima Chilo, was published. Realities and surrealities are reflected in this novel. In 2006 Mukher Dike Dekhi was published. The novel Abu Ibrahimer Mirtu was posthumously published in 2009.

== Personal life ==
Shaheedul Jahir was a confirmed bachelor and was often questioned on this. In an interview with Kamruzzaman Jahangir, the editor of the literary magazine Katha, he said he was unable to explain this phenomenon: 'I can tell nothing about this. This has just happened.' He was less talkative and introverted. It was hard to befriend him, but he was very friendly. He left behind a family that consisted of 4 brothers and 4 sisters. His father died in 1990, and his mother lives with his younger brothers and sisters at his paternal home at Noyatola, Boro Moghbazar, Dhaka, where he used to reside before moving to government quarter after joining the civil service. He spoke little and appeared to be introverted. It was difficult to make friends with him, although he was known to be a very amiable person.

== Death ==
He died from acute myocardial infarction (massive heart attack) on 23 March 2008 at the LabAid Cardiac Hospital in Dhaka. His death was noted within the literary community. His death was mourned by the president and prime minister of the country, in addition to the literary circle. He was buried at the Martyred Intellectuals Graveyard at Mirpur, Dhaka.

== Bibliography ==
Zahir only published six books during his lifetime. There are some published stories and novels that remain to be published in book form, in addition to some unpublished works. His last published story is titled "The Miracle of Life" which remains to be anthologised. One novel published in a magazine titled Abu Ibrahim-er Mrityu (tr. Death of Abu Ibrahim), which was published in the magazine Nipun earlier, has already been published as a book by Mowla Brothers in the February 2009 Ekushey Book Fair.

=== Novels ===
- Jibon O Rajnaitik Bastobota (1988)
- Se Ratey Purnima Chilo (1995)
- Mukher Dike Dekhi (2006)
- Abu Ibrahimer Mirtu (2009)

=== Stories ===
- Parapar (1985)
- Dumur-kheko Manush O Annanya Galpo (1999)
- Dolu Nadir Hawa O Annanya Galpo (2004)

=== Collection ===
Two volumes have been published compiling selected short stories and novels of Shaheedul Jahir. These are:

- Shahidul Zahir Nirbachita Golpo (February 2006, Pathak Samabesh, Dhaka, ISBN 9848243380)
- Shahidul Zahir Nirbachita Uponyash (February 2007, Pathak Samabesh, Dhaka, ISBN 9848243402)

== Filmography ==
original story

- Phulkumar (2000) by Ashique Mostafa
- Valobasha (2019, short) by Shuvra Goshwami
- Kanta (2021) by Tokon Thakur

=== Televisions ===
original story

- Choturtha Matra (2001) by Nurul Alam Atique
- Kothay Pabo Tarey by Mostofa Sarwar Farooki
- Kanta (2010) by Animesh Aich

== In popular culture ==
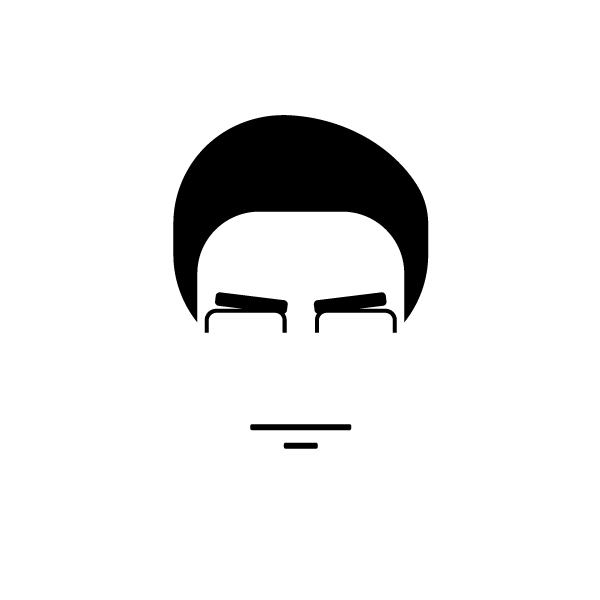
A minimal portrait of Zahir

Zahir's stories and novels have been adapted into films, television dramas, and theatre productions. In 2002, Ashik Mostafa made a film titled Phulkumar, which was based on Zahir's 1993 story "Ei Somoy". From the same story, Iqbal Khorshed has made a play. The story was published in 1999 in the compilation of Dumur-kheko Manush O Annanya Galpo. Token Thakur is making a film with the same title based on his 1995 physiological story "Kanta". Shuvra Goswami directed a short film of the same title, starring Deepak Sumon and Moushumi Hamid, based on Zahir's first story, Bhalobasha, written in 1974, published in the 1985 edition of Parapar.

His short story "Choturtha Matra" was the basis of an award-winning video film by Nurul Alam Atique. Atique also made a television drama based on the story Kothay Pabo Tarey with the same title in 2009.

Desh Natyadal has also produced a play called "Janme Janmantar" based on his 1992 story "Kathurey O Darkak". Theater group Arshinagar has also produced a play directed by Reza Arif based on his 1995 novel Se Ratey Purnima Chilo.

== Awards ==
list of awards
Organizer	Year	Category	Work	Result	Ref.
Alaol Literary Puroshkar	2004	Novel		Won	
Kagoz Literary Award	2004	Fiction	Dolu Nadir Hawa O Annanya Galpo (2004)	Won	
Prothom Alo Book of the Year	2009	Book of the Year	Abu Ibrahimer Mirtu (2009)	Won	Posthumous
Ekushey Padak	2025	Language and Literature	-	Won	

== See also ==
- List of Bangladeshi writers
