= Md. Quamrul Hassan =

Bangladeshi politician (born 1973)

- মোঃ কামরুল হাসান

Member of Parliament
- Incumbent
- Assumed office 13 February 2026
- Preceded by: (seat previously vacant following 2024 dissolution)
- Constituency: Mymensingh-6

Personal details
- Born: 18 June 1973 (age 53)
- Party: Bangladesh Jamaat-e-Islami
- Occupation: Politician

Md. Quamrul Hassan (Bengali: মোঃ কামরুল হাসান; born 18 June 1973) is a Bangladeshi politician serving as the Member of Parliament for the Mymensingh-6 constituency.
