= Anisur Rahman (Bangladeshi politician) =

Bangladeshi politician

Member of Parliament from Undivided Mymensingh-6
- In office 1973–1973
- Preceded by: Seats start
- Succeeded by: AKM Fazlul Haque

Member of Parliament from Mymensingh-6
- In office 1988–1990
- Preceded by: Abdus Salam Tarafdar
- Succeeded by: Md. A. Khaleq

Personal details
- Party: Jatiya Party (Ershad)
- Other political affiliations: Bangladesh Awami League

Anisur Rahman is a Bangladeshi politician of the Jatiya Party (Ershad) and a former member of parliament for undivided Mymensingh-6 and Mymensingh-7. He was an organizer of the Liberation War of Bangladesh.

== Career ==
Anisur Rahman was elected to parliament from undivided Mymensingh-6 as a Bangladesh Awami League candidate in 1973. He was elected to parliament from Mymensingh-7 as a Jatiya Party candidate in 1988. He was the organizer of the Liberation War of Bangladesh.

He lost the 5th Jatiya Sangsad elections of 1991 from the Mymensingh-7 constituency with the nomination of Jatiya Party.
