= Mahabubur Rahman Liton =

Bangladeshi politician

Members of Parliament
- Incumbent
- Assumed office 17 February 2026
- Preceded by: ABM Anisuzzaman
- Constituency: Mymensingh-7

Personal details
- Party: Bangladesh Nationalist Party
- Occupation: Politician

Mahabubur Rahman Liton is a Bangladeshi politician the Bangladesh Nationalist Party. He was elected as the Member of Parliament for the Mymensingh-7 constituency in the 2026 Bangladeshi general election held on 12 February 2026.
