= M. A. Hannan (politician, born 1935) =

Bangladeshi politician (1935–2021)

Member of Parliament for Mymensingh-7
- In office 5 January 2014 – 30 December 2018
- Preceded by: Reza Ali
- Succeeded by: Ruhul Amin Madani

Personal details
- Born: 11 April 1935
- Died: 15 June 2021 (aged 86) BSMMU
- Party: Jatiya Party

M. A. Hannan (Bengali: এম. এ. হান্নান, 11 April 1935 – 15 June 2021) was a Bangladeshi politician who served as Member of Parliament from Mymensingh-7.

== Early life ==
Hannan was born on 11 April 1935. He completed his undergraduate from the University of Dhaka.

== Career ==
Hannan was elected to Parliament from Mymensingh-7 as a Jatiya Party candidate in 2014 and served till 2018. On 31 October 2016, he was charged with committing war crimes during the Bangladesh Liberation war.

== Death ==
Hannan died on 15 June 2021 from cancer at Bangabandhu Sheikh Mujib Medical University in Dhaka.
