= Mymensingh-6 =

Constituency of Bangladesh's Jatiya Sangsad

Coordinates: 24.63°N 90.27°E

- Constituency for the Jatiya Sangsad
- District: Mymensingh District
- Division: Mymensingh Division
- Electorate: 325,740 (2018)

Current constituency
- Created: 1973
- MP: Md. Quamrul Hassan
- ← 150 Mymensingh-5 152 Mymensingh-7 →

Mymensingh-6 is a constituency represented in the Jatiya Sangsad (National Parliament) of Bangladesh.

== Boundaries ==
The constituency encompasses Fulbaria Upazila.

== History ==
The constituency was created for the first general elections in newly independent Bangladesh, held in 1973.

== Members of Parliament ==
Election	Member	Party
1973	Md. Anisur Rahman	Awami League
1979	AKM Fazlul Haque	BNP
1986	Moslem Uddin	Awami League
1988	Habib Ullah Sarkar	Jatiya Party
1991	Khandaker Amirul Islam	BNP
Feb 1996	Shamsuddin Ahmed	BNP
Jun 1996	Moslem Uddin	Awami League
2001	Shamsuddin Ahmed	Independent
2008	Moslem Uddin	Awami League
2024	Malek Sarkar	Independent
2026	Md. Quamrul Hassan	Bangladesh Jamaat-e-Islami

== Elections ==
=== Elections in the 2010s ===
General Election 2014: Mymensingh-6
Party	Candidate	Votes	%	±%
AL	Moslem Uddin	164,213	95.2	+35.5
JSD	Abdur Rahman	8,294	4.8	N/A
Majority		155,919	90.4	+69.4
Turnout		172,507	59.1	−22.9
AL hold				

=== Elections in the 2000s ===
General Election 2008: Mymensingh-6
Party	Candidate	Votes	%	±%
AL	Moslem Uddin	125,629	59.7	+28.9
BNP	Shamsuddin Ahmed	81,514	38.8	N/A
IAB	Nurul Alam Siddiqui	807	0.4	N/A
BML	Md. Hashmatullah Sheikh	774	0.4	N/A
KSJL	Md. Abdur Rashid	593	0.3	−0.6
BKA	Ahmad Ali	533	0.3	N/A
Jatiya Samajtantrik Dal-JSD	Md. Shamsul Alam Khan	498	0.2	N/A
Majority		44,115	21.0	+18.7
Turnout		210,348	82.0	+12.0
AL gain from Independent				

General Election 2001: Mymensingh-6
Party	Candidate	Votes	%	±%
Independent	Shamsuddin Ahmed	56,573	33.2	N/A
AL	Moslem Uddin	52,621	30.8	−13.6
Jamaat	Md. Jashim Uddin	47,375	27.8	+11.7
IJOF	K. R. Islam	11,012	6.5	N/A
KSJL	Md. Abdur Rashid	1,555	0.9	N/A
Jatiya Party (M)	Md. Fazlul Haq	1,230	0.7	N/A
Gano Forum	A. K. M. Shamsul Huda	257	0.2	N/A
Majority		3,952	2.3	−12.3
Turnout		170,623	70.0	+8.6
Independent gain from AL				

=== Elections in the 1990s ===
General Election June 1996: Mymensingh-6
Party	Candidate	Votes	%	±%
AL	Moslem Uddin	47,827	44.4	+16.1
BNP	Shamsuddin Ahmed	32,138	29.8	+1.0
Jamaat	Jasim Uddin	17,378	16.1	−10.1
JP(E)	K. R. Islam	8,583	8.0	+4.8
Independent	Habib Ullah Sarkar	1,354	1.3	N/A
Zaker Party	Md. Masiur Rahman Badal	545	0.5	+0.3
Majority		15,689	14.6	+14.1
Turnout		107,825	61.4	+18.4
AL gain from BNP				

General Election 1991: Mymensingh-6
Party	Candidate	Votes	%	±%
BNP	Khandaker Amirul Islam	24,023	28.8	
AL	Moslem Uddin	23,609	28.3	
Jamaat	Jasim Uddin	21,830	26.2	
Independent	ANM Nazrul Islam	8,040	9.6	
JP(E)	Habib Ullah Sarkar	2,640	3.2	
Bangladesh Janata Party	A. B. M. A. Baki	1,713	2.1	
BAKSAL	Md. Moslem Uddin	553	0.7	
Bangladesh People's League (Garib A Nawaz)	Shah Md. Sohrab Ali	401	0.5	
NDP	Md. Bazlul Karim Chowdhury	254	0.3	
Jatiya Samajtantrik Dal-JSD	Jahurul Haq	185	0.2	
Zaker Party	Md. Safir Uddin	184	0.2	
Majority		414	0.5	
Turnout		83,432	43.0	
BNP gain from				
