= Jibon O Rajnaitik Bastobota =

1988 novel by Shahidul Zahir

- Cover of the first edition
- Author: Shahidul Zahir
- Original title: জীবন ও রাজনৈতিক বাস্তবতা
- Language: Bengali
- Genre: Novella
- Set in: Bangladesh Liberation War
- Publisher: Mowla Brothers
- Publication date: February 1988
- Publication place: Bangladesh
- Media type: print (hardcover)
- Pages: 48 (original first edition)
- Followed by: Se Ratey Purnima Chilo (1995)

Jibon O Rajnaitik Bastobota is a Bengali novel by Shahidul Zahir. It was published in Dhaka by Mowla Brothers in 1988 as a debut novel by Zahir. The novella is set against the backdrop of the Bangladesh Liberation War in 1971.

== In popular culture ==
A stage adaptation with the same title, based on the novel, was performed in Dhaka under the direction of dramatist Syed Jamil Ahmed. The inaugural show was held on 23 March 2019, on the death anniversary of Zahir.
