= Abu Ibrahimer Mirtu =

2009 novel by Shahidul Zahir

- Cover of first edition
- Author: Shahidul Zahir
- Original title: আবু ইব্রাহীমের মৃত্যু
- Cover artist: Dhruba Esh
- Language: Bengali
- Genre: Novella
- Publisher: Mowla Brothers
- Publication date: 4 February 2009
- Publication place: Bangladesh
- Media type: Hardcover
- Pages: 64
- Awards: Prothom Alo Borsho Shera Boi (2009)
- OCLC: 1112253798
- LC Class: PK1730.25.A445
- Preceded by: Mukher Dike Dekhi (2006)

Abu Ibrahimer Mirtu (Abu Ibrahim's Death or "The Death of Abu Ibrahim") is a Bengali novella written by Shahidul Zahir. This is Zahir's fourth novel posthumously published by Mowla Brothers in 2009. Written against the backdrop of the reign of the then-dictator Hussein Muhammad Ershad, it is a novella, the story of which is rich in connotations and commentary on the human experience. The dedication of the novel reads: "People does die, of course, but the meaning of death is different..." Also includes "A person is inherently dead, or heavier than Taishan, or lighter than a feather" quote by Chinese historian Sima Qian (206 BC–AD 220).

Some find interactions between Abu Ibrahimer Mirtu and Crónica de una muerte anunciada (1981) by Gabriel García Márquez. The novel won the Prothom Alo Borsho Shera Boi award in the creative category in 2010.

== Summary ==
Abu Ibrahim, the main character of the novel is indeed an unhappy man. He spent his life in conflict between truth and false and good and evil. The story of the novel starts from the day of his death and ends with his death. He is a government officer by profession. Ibrahim's precarious interactions with his wife, daughter, co-workers, bribe-giving businessman and old girlfriend are the subjects of the novel. The background of the novel is set in the government colony of Dhaka's Bailey Road, Dhaka University, Motijheel, Bangladesh Secretariat and Sirajganj areas.

== Publications ==
Before being published as a book, Abu Ibrahimer Mirtu was published in Nipun on 6 June 1991. Later, the first print was published by Mowla Brothers in Dhaka in February 2009 and the third in February 2020.

== Character ==
- Abu Ibrahim - Government employee
- Mamata - Abu Ibrahim's wife
- Bindu - Abu Ibrahim's daughter
- Helen - Abu Ibrahim's classmate
- Siddik Hosen - Office Boss

== Translation ==
The novel has been translated into English under the title "Abu Ibrahimer Mirtu" in Life and Political Reality: Two Novellas, published in 2022 by Saghati Prakashan. It was translated from Bengali by Indian translators V Ramaswamy and Shahroza Nahrin. The same year the novel won the Anubad Sahitya Puraskar (Translation Literature Award) in the Best Translated Book of the Year category.
