= Soumitra Sekhar Dey =

Bangladeshi linguist and educationist

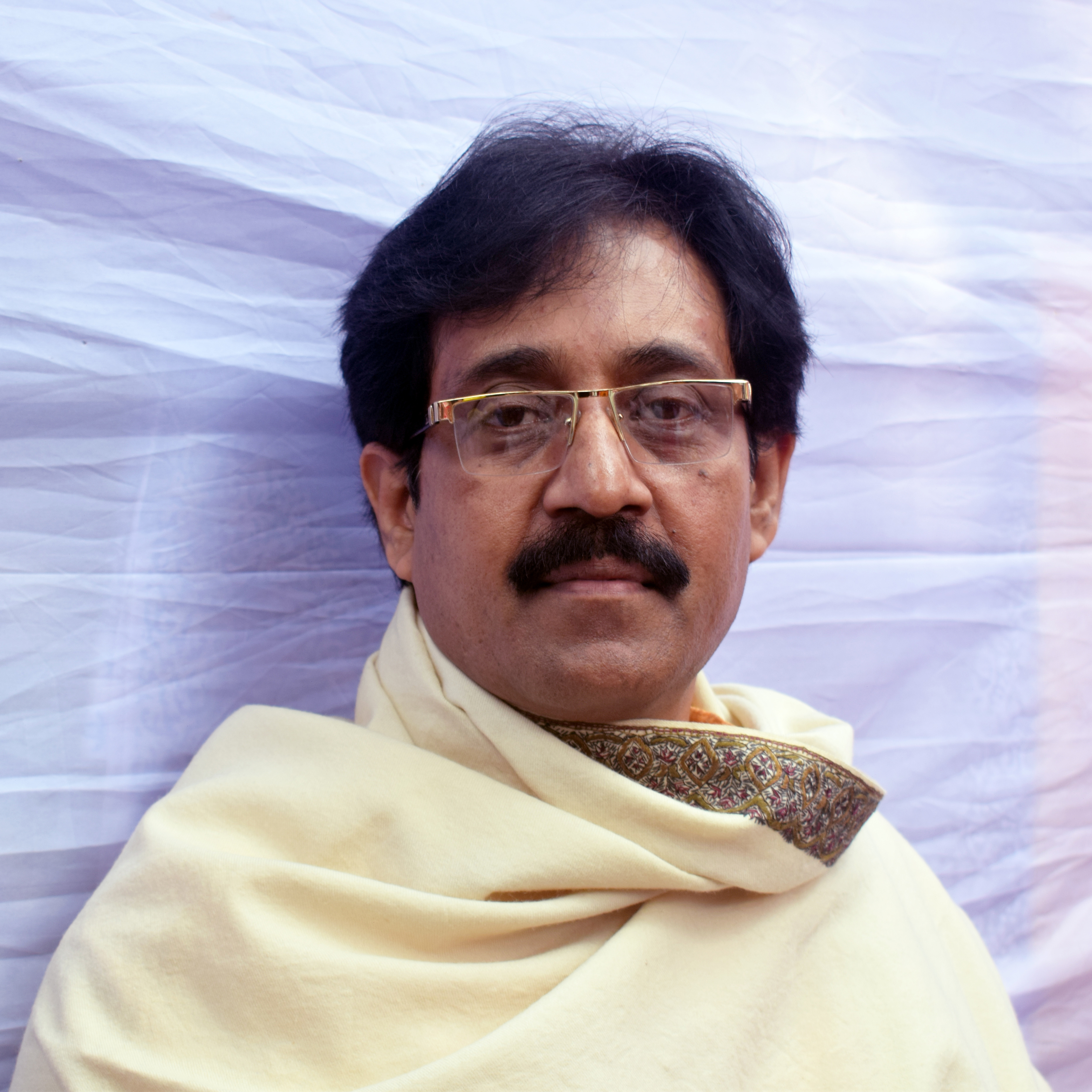
- Soumitra Sekhar Dey in 2024

6th Vice-chancellor of Jatiya Kabi Kazi Nazrul Islam University
- In office 15 December 2021 – 14 August 2024
- Chancellor: President of Bangladesh
- Preceded by: A.H.M Mustafizur Rahman

Personal details
- Born: Sherpur
- Education: MA (Bengali); PhD (Bengali)
- Alma mater: Jahangirnagar University; Dhaka University; Rabindra Bharati University
- Occupation: linguist; educationist; columinst; editor; professor

Soumitra Sekhar Dey (Bengali: সৌমিত্র শেখর দে) is a leading Bengali linguist, educationist, and writer from Bangladesh. He served as the 6th vice chancellor of Jatiya Kabi Kazi Nazrul Islam University.

== Early life and education ==
Soumitra was born in Sherpur, Mymensingh Bangladesh. He earned BA & MA degrees in Bengali from the Jahangirnagar University. He also obtained a PhD in Bengali from the Rabindra Bharati University in 1997.

== Professional life ==
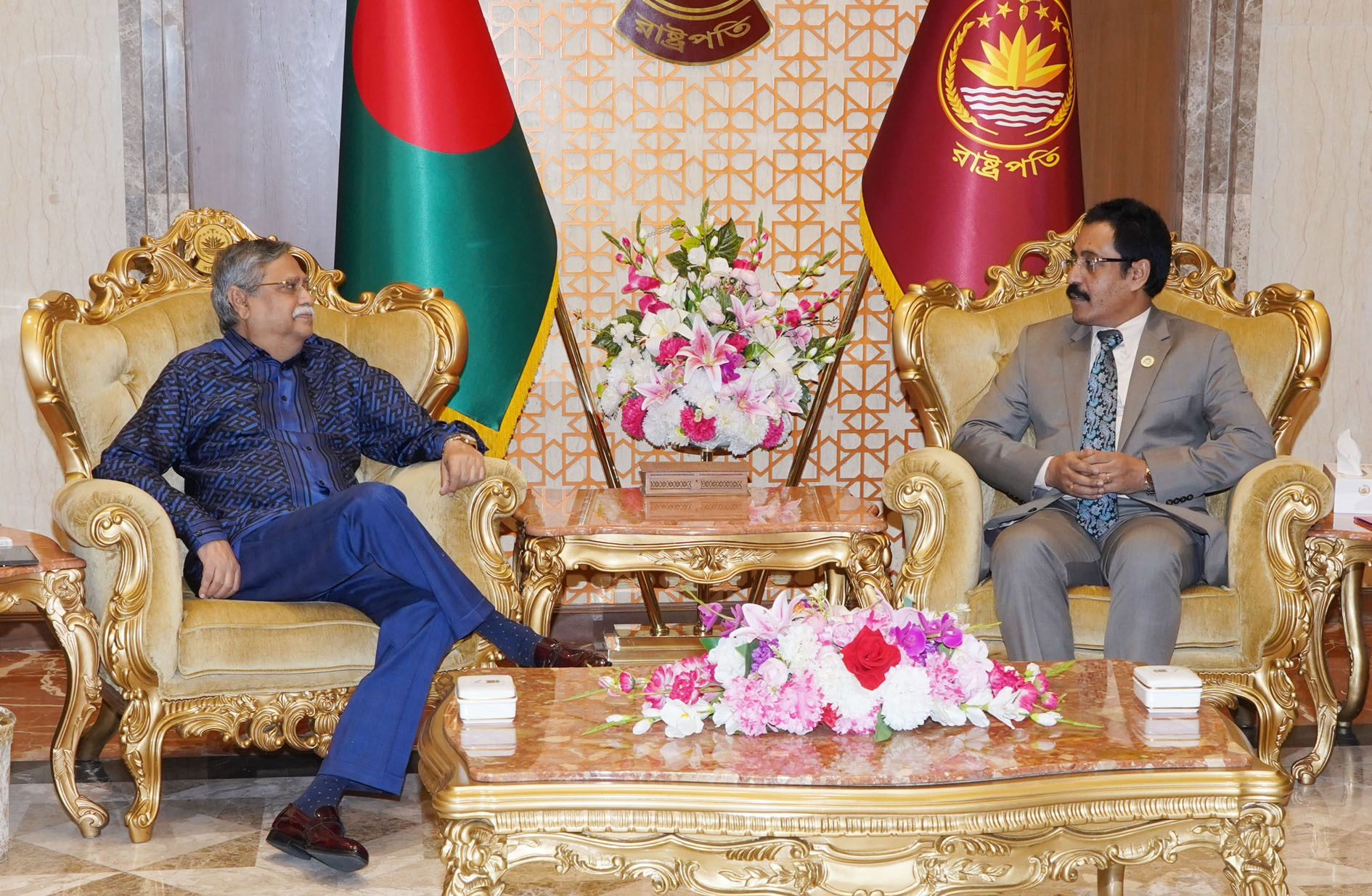
Shekhar with President Mohammad Shahabuddin.

He started his teaching career at Chittagong University in 1996. Then the next year he joined as a lecturer in Dhaka University. He worked as a Nazrul Research Center in there.

He is a writer and education columnist.

== Publications ==
- GoddhoShilpi Mir Mosharraf (গদ্যশিল্পী মীর মশাররফ)
- Nazrul Kobitar Pathved O Onanno Prosongo (নজরুল কবিতার পাঠভেদ ও অন্যান্য প্রসঙ্গ)
- Bangla Vasha O Sahittya Jiggasha (বাংলা ভাষা ও সাহিত্য জিজ্ঞাসা)
- Civil Society & Onanno Probondho (সিভিল সোসাইটি ও অন্যান্য প্রবন্ধ)
- Bekoron Sondha (ব্যাকরণ সন্ধান)
- Kothashilpo Onneshon (কথাশিল্প অন্বেষণ)
- Satyen Sen er Uponnashe Jibon O Shilper Mithoskriya (সত্যেন সেনের উপন্যাসে জীবন ও শিল্পের মিথস্ক্রিয়া)
- Shater Kobita Shorobiddh Kobikul (ষাটের কবিতাঃ ভালোবাসার শরবিদ্ধ কবিকূল)
- Vashar Pran Vashar Bitorko (ভাষার প্রাণ ভাষার বিতর্ক)
- Sorkari Kormokomison O Shikkhavbna (সরকারি কর্মকমিশন ও শিক্ষাভাবনা)
- Dhaka Bisshobiddyaloy Chetonar Batighor (ঢাকা বিশ্ববিদ্যালয়ঃ চেতনার বাতিঘর)
- Nazrul Antodhormiyo Sompriti O Shilper Bodh(নজরুলঃ আন্তঃধর্মীয় সম্প্রীতি এবং শিল্পের বোধ)
- Moslem Bharat (মোসলেম ভারতঃ বিষয় বিশ্লেষণ)
- Shikkhar Dhara Porikkhar Kara (শিক্ষার ধারা পরীক্ষার কারা)

== Awards and honours ==
- Dhaka University Arts Dean's Award - 2001
- Mayenuddin Foundation Award - 2008
- Nazrul Padak - 2014
- D. Litt. Degree - 2022
