= Habib Ullah Sarkar =

Bangladeshi politician

Member of Parliament from Mymensingh-9
- In office 1979–1982
- Preceded by: Kudratullah Mandal
- Succeeded by: Rafiq Uddin Bhuiyan

Member of Parliament from Mymensingh-6
- In office 1988–1990
- Preceded by: Moslem Uddin
- Succeeded by: Khandaker Amirul Islam

Personal details
- Born: Patira, Fulbaria thana, British India
- Party: Jatiya Party
- Other political affiliations: Bangladesh Nationalist Party

Habib Ullah Sarkar is a Bangladeshi politician of the Bangladesh Nationalist Party who served as member of parliament for Mymensingh-9 and Mymensingh-6.

== Biography ==
Habib Ullah Sarkar was born in Patira village of what is now Fulbaria Upazila, Mymensingh District, Bangladesh.

Sarkar was elected to parliament from Mymensingh-9 as a Bangladesh Nationalist Party candidate in 1979. He joined the Jatiya Party in 1988. He was elected to parliament from Mymensingh-6 as an independent candidate in 1988 Bangladeshi general election.

In the fifth national election of 1991, he was defeated as a Jatiya Party candidate from Mymensingh-6 constituency. In the June 1996 Bangladeshi general election, he was defeated as an independent candidate from Mymensingh-6 constituency.
