= Mizanur Rahman (politician) =

Bangladesh Awami League politician

Member of Bangladesh Parliament
- In office 1973–1979
- Succeeded by: Abul Mansur Ahmed

Personal details
- Party: Bangladesh Awami League

Mizanur Rahman is a Bangladesh Awami League politician and a former member of parliament for Mymensingh-7.

== Career ==
Rahman was elected to parliament from Mymensingh-7 as a Bangladesh Awami League candidate in 1973.
