= Mohit Ul Alam =

Bangladeshi writer

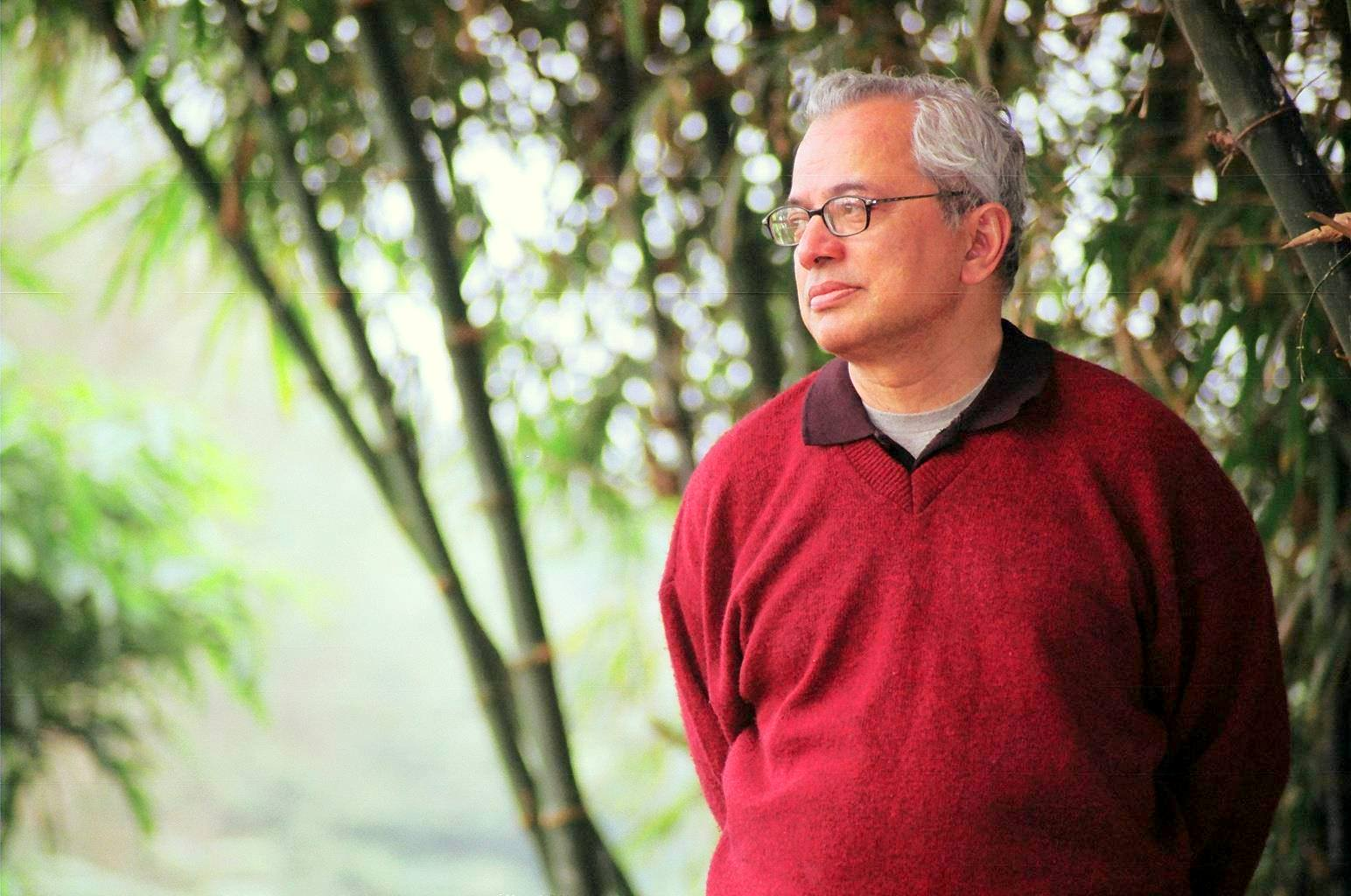
- Born: 13 December 1952 (age 73); Chittagong, East Bengal, Pakistan
- Occupations: Writer, poet, professor

Academic background
- Education: MA; MA (English); PhD (English)
- Alma mater: University of Chittagong

Academic work
- Institutions: Jatiya Kabi Kazi Nazrul Islam University Premier University, Chittagong

Mohit Ul Alam (born 13 December 1952 in Chittagong) is the former vice chancellor of Jatiya Kabi Kazi Nazrul Islam University at Trishal, Mymensingh and now Professor in Department of English at Premier University, Chittagong. He is a Shakespearean scholar.

== Education ==
Alam passed his master's and Honours from Chittagong University in English, and then secured another master's degree in English from Lakehead University, Thunder Bay, Canada, and then he earned his PhD degree from Dhaka University.

== Academic life ==
Alam is a former professor of Chittagong University. He was former dean of English and Humanities Department in the University of Liberal Arts Bangladesh and also the founder and chairman of Department of English Literature and Language in Premier University, Chittagong.

== Writing ==
He has more than 56 books to his credit – fiction, poetry, and nonfiction, including books on teaching English. In addition, he has written columns published in Bangla and English dailies addressing current issues. He was a syndicated sports-columnist for Prothom Alo during the soccer World Cup (2010) and ICC Cricket World Cup in 2011, respectively. He has been the editor of the academic journal Crossings: ULAB Journal of English Studies.
