= T. Ali =

Bangladeshi lawyer

- টি আলী

Federal Minister of Pakistan
- In office 7 December 1953 – 4 October 1954
- Governor-general: Malik Ghulam Muhammad
- Portfolio: Commerce
- Preceded by: Fazlur Rahman
- Succeeded by: Abul Hassan Ispahani

Provincial Minister of East Pakistan
- In office 15 September 1948 – 6 December 1953
- Governor: Frederick Chalmers Bourne; A. S. M. Akram; Feroz Khan Noon; Abdur Rahman Siddiqui; Chaudhry Khaliquzzaman
- Portfolio: Finance, Revenue and Agriculture
- Preceded by: Hamidul Huq Choudhury; Abdul Motaleb Malik
- Succeeded by: Abu Hussain Sarkar; Abdul Latif Biswas; Yusuf Ali Chowdhury

Personal details
- Born: Md. Tafazzal Ali; 1 July 1906 Tipperah District, Eastern Bengal and Assam, British India
- Died: 13 December 1988 (aged 82) Bangkok Hospital, Thailand
- Resting place: Banani graveyard
- Party: PML
- Other political affiliations: AIML (1937–1947)
- Relations: Reza Ali (son)
- Education: University of Calcutta
- Profession: Lawyer

Md. Tafazzal Ali, commonly known as T. Ali (1906–1988), was a Bangladeshi lawyer and politician, who was federal minister of Pakistan as a member of Ministry of Talents and provincial minister of East Pakistan as a member of Amin ministry.

== Biography ==
Ali was born on 1 July 1906 in Kasba, Tippera District, Eastern Bengal and Assam, British India. He acquired his Bachelor of Arts degree from Islamia College, Calcutta. After obtaining his Bachelor of Law degree from the University of Calcutta in 1933, Ali started his career as a lawyer of Calcutta High Court. In 1936, he became a member of the Tippera District Board.

He was elected from the Tippera North-East constituency in the 1946 Bengal Legislative Assembly election, becoming a member and deputy speaker of the Bengal Legislative Assembly. After 1947, he became a member of the East Bengal Legislative Assembly. In 1948, he was appointed as provincial minister for revenue in East Pakistan. Later, he was given the provincial portfolios of finance and agriculture. In 1953, he was appointed as federal minister for commerce in Pakistan.

In 1955, he was appointed as ambassador of Pakistan to Egypt for a year. He was elected president of the East Pakistan High Court Bar Association in 1962 and Bangladesh Supreme Court Bar Association in 1975. Ali died on 13 December 1988 at Bangkok Hospital, Thailand. Politician Reza Ali and military personnel Major Sadek Ali were his sons.
