= ABM Anisuzzaman =

Bangladeshi politician

- এ বি এম আনিসুজ্জামান

Member of the Bangladesh Parliament for Mymensingh-7
- In office 30 January 2024 – 6 August 2024
- Preceded by: Ruhul Amin Madani

Personal details
- Born: 31 December 1968 (age 57)
- Party: Independent
- Occupation: Politician

ABM Anisuzzaman is a Bangladeshi politician and a former member of Jatiya Sangsad representing the Mymensingh-7 constituency. In 2024, following the fall of the Awami League government through the student public uprising, President Mohammad Shahabuddin dissolved the Jatiya Sangsad, resulting in the termination of his membership in Parliament.

== Political life ==
Anisuzzaman was elected member of parliament from the Mymensingh-7 constituency as a candidate of Bangladesh independent politician in the seventh national parliament election on 24 January 2024.
