= Se Ratey Purnima Chilo =

1995 novel by Shahidul Zahir

- Cover of the first edition
- Author: Shahidul Zahir
- Original title: সে রাতে পূর্ণিমা ছিল
- Language: Bengali
- Genre: Novel
- Publisher: Mowla Brothers
- Publication date: February 1995
- Publication place: Bangladesh
- Media type: Print (hardcover)
- Preceded by: Jibon O Rajnaitik Bastobota (1988)
- Followed by: Mukher Dike Dekhi (2006)

Se Ratey Purnima Chilo (Bengali: সে রাতে পূর্ণিমা ছিল) is a Bengali novel by Shahidul Zahir. It was published in Dhaka by Mowla Brothers in 1995 as the second novel by Zahir. It's based on the story of killing the family of Mofizuddin Miah, the dictator of Suhasini village.

== In popular culture ==
In 2016, a play with the same title based on this novel was produced by Natyadal Arshinagar and directed by Reza Arif.
