= Mymensingh-7 =

Constituency of Bangladesh's Jatiya Sangsad

Coordinates: 24.58°N 90.39°E

- Constituency for the Jatiya Sangsad
- District: Mymensingh District
- Division: Mymensingh Division
- Electorate: 315,508 (2018)

Current constituency
- Created: 1973
- MP: Mahabubur Rahman Liton
- ← 151 Mymensingh-6 153 Mymensingh-8 →

Mymensingh-7 is a constituency represented in the Jatiya Sangsad (National Parliament) of Bangladesh.

== Boundaries ==
The constituency encompasses Trishal Upazila.

== History ==
The constituency was created for the first general elections in newly independent Bangladesh, held in 1973.

Ahead of the 2008 general election, the Election Commission redrew constituency boundaries to reflect population changes revealed by the 2001 Bangladesh census. The 2008 redistricting altered the boundaries of the constituency.

== Members of Parliament ==
Election	Member	Party
1973	Mizanur Rahman	Awami League
1979	Abul Mansur Ahmed	BNP
1986	Abdus Salam Tarafdar	Awami League
1988	Anisur Rahman	Jatiya Party
1991	Md. A. Khaleq	BNP
Feb 1996	Mahbub Anam	BNP
Jun 1996	Ruhul Amin Madani	Awami League
2001	Abdul Matin Sarkar	Awami League
2008	Reza Ali	Awami League
2014	M. A. Hannan	Jatiya Party
2018	Ruhul Amin Madani	Awami League
2024	ABM Anisuzzaman	Independent
2026	Mahabubur Rahman Liton	BNP

== Elections ==
=== Elections in the 2010s ===
General Election 2014: Mymensingh-7
Party	Candidate	Votes	%	±%
JP(E)	M. A. Hannan	36,964	52.6	N/A
Independent	Ruhul Amin Madani	33,364	47.4	N/A
Majority		3,600	5.1	−34.0
Turnout		70,328	25.7	−56.3
JP(E) gain from AL				

=== Elections in the 2000s ===
General Election 2008: Mymensingh-7
Party	Candidate	Votes	%	±%
AL	Reza Ali	135,379	68.5	+17.1
BNP	Md. Mahbubur Rahman	58,040	29.4	−6.0
IAB	Md. Magfurur Rahman	1,857	0.9	N/A
Independent	Abdul Maleque Forazi	1,714	0.9	N/A
Gano Forum	Md. Fazlul Karim	754	0.4	N/A
Majority		77,339	39.1	+23.1
Turnout		197,744	82.0	+12.6
AL hold				

General Election 2001: Mymensingh-7
Party	Candidate	Votes	%	±%
AL	Abdul Matin Sarkar	82,159	51.4	+8.5
BNP	Md. A. Khaleq	56,592	35.4	+10.6
IJOF	M. A. Hannan	20,553	12.8	N/A
WPB	Sujit Barman	492	0.3	+0.1
Jatiya Party (M)	Md. Mosaraf Hossain	194	0.1	N/A
Majority		25,567	16.0	+0.1
Turnout		159,990	69.4	+6.5
AL hold				

=== Elections in the 1990s ===
General Election June 1996: Mymensingh-7
Party	Candidate	Votes	%	±%
AL	Ruhul Amin Madani	46,772	42.9	+11.6
JP(E)	M. A. Hannan	29,456	27.0	+12.7
BNP	Md. A. Khaleq	27,090	24.8	−7.1
Jamaat	Fazlul Haque	4,937	4.5	−12.4
Islamic Sashantantrik Andolan	Md. Narul Islam	246	0.2	N/A
WPB	Sujit Barman	234	0.2	N/A
Zaker Party	Md. Abul Hossain	216	0.2	−0.2
Independent	Mohbub Anam	153	0.1	N/A
Majority		17,316	15.9	+15.3
Turnout		109,104	62.9	+15.2
AL gain from BNP				

General Election 1991: Mymensingh-7
Party	Candidate	Votes	%	±%
BNP	Md. A. Khaleq	28,349	31.9	
AL	Abdus Salam Tarafdar	27,838	31.3	
Jamaat	Fazlul Haq	15,060	16.9	
JP(E)	Anisur Rahman	12,727	14.3	
Bangladesh Janata Party	Anwar Hossain Khan	2,142	2.4	
JSD	Md. Nurul Amin	1,631	1.8	
Jatiya Samajtantrik Dal-JSD	Md. Razab Ali	480	0.5	
Zaker Party	A. Hossain	347	0.4	
FP	Shaukat Ali	180	0.2	
Janasakti Party	Md. Fazlul Haq	115	0.1	
Majority		511	0.6	
Turnout		88,869	47.7	
BNP gain from JP(E)				
