= Ruhul Amin Madani =

Bangladeshi politician

Mohammad Hafez Ruhul Amin Madani
- রুহুল আমীন মাদানী

Member of Parliament for Mymensingh-7
- Incumbent
- Assumed office 30 January 2019
- Preceded by: Muhammad Abdul Hannan
- In office 12 June 1996 – 15 July 2001
- Preceded by: Mahbub Anam
- Succeeded by: Abdul Matin Sarkar

Personal details
- Born: 10 February 1952 (age 73)
- Died: 12 August 2025
- Political party: Bangladesh Awami League

Mohammad Hafez Ruhul Amin Madani (Bengali: মোঃ হাফেজ রুহুল আমিন মাদানী; born 10 February 1952) is a Bangladeshi politician and the incumbent member of the Bangladesh Parliament from Mymensingh-7.

== Career ==
Madani was elected to parliament from Mymensingh-7 as a Bangladesh Awami League candidate on 30 December 2018. He is a member of the standing committee of Ministry of Religious Affairs.
