= Dolu Nadir Hawa O Annanya Galpo =

Bengali short story collection

- Cover of first edition
- Author: Shahidul Zahir
- Original title: ডলু নদীর হাওয়া ও অন্যান্য গল্প
- Cover artist: Qayyum Chowdhury
- Language: Bengali
- Genre: Short story
- Publisher: Mowla Brothers
- Publication date: 1 January 2004
- Publication place: Bangladesh
- Media type: Hardcover
- Pages: 131
- Awards: Kagaz Sahitya Puraskar (2004)
- ISBN: 9844104203
- OCLC: 1042566780
- Preceded by: Dumur Kheko Manush O Annanya Galpo (1999)

Dolu Nadir Hawa O Annanya Galpo is a Bengali short story collection written by Shahidul Zahir. This is Zahir's third collection of short stories published by Mowla Brothers on 1 January 2004 in Bangladesh. It compiled seven stories, written between 1999 and 2003. In the background of the stories, there are various contexts and curiosities related to the people from Bhuter Goli (Bhajahari Saha Street) at Puran Dhaka and villagers, and the love, dreams and dream-breaking of the people.

The title of the book taken from the river Dolu, which flows through Lohagara through the eastern hilly region of Bandarban and Satkania in Chittagong district of Bangladesh. Zaheer lived in Satkania for some time before his secondary examination and studied at Satkania Adarsh High School.

The book won Kagaz Sahitya Puraskar in 2004.

== Contents ==
Sl.	Title	Original title	Written year
1	"Kothay Pabo Tare"	"কোথায় পাবো তারে"	1999
2	"Amader Bakul"	"আমাদের বকুল"	2000
3	"Mahallay Bandar, Abdu l Halimer Maa Ebong Amra"	"মহল্লায় বান্দর, আব্দুল হালিমের মা এবং আমরা"	2000
4	"Indur-Bilai Khela"	"ইন্দুর-বিলাই খেলা"	2002
5	"Pratham Bayan"	"প্রথম বয়ান"	2002
6	"Dolu Nadir Hawa"	"ডলু নদীর হাওয়া"	2003
7	"Amader Kutir Shilper Itihas"	"আমাদের কুটির শিল্পের ইতিহাস"	1995

== Award ==
Award	Year	Category	Ref.
Kagaz Sahitya Puraskar	2004	Fiction	
