= M. Shamsur Rahman =

Bangladeshi academic (c.1940–2020)

Vice-Chancellor of Jatiya Kabi Kazi Nazrul Islam University
- In office 7 June 2006 – 19 April 2009

Personal details
- Born: c. 1940
- Died: 16 February 2020 (aged 80)

M. Shamsur Rahman (c. 1940 – 16 February 2020) was a Bangladeshi academic and writer. He was the first vice-chancellor of Jatiya Kabi Kazi Nazrul Islam University.

== Biography ==
Shamsur Rahman was a professor of public administration and political science department of University of Rajshahi. He also wrote books about public administration and political science.

Shamsur Rahman served as the project director of Jatiya Kabi Kazi Nazrul Islam University from 24 July 2004 to 6 June 2006. Then, he served as the vice-chancellor of Jatiya Kabi Kazi Nazrul Islam University from 7 June 2006 to 19 April 2009.

Shamsur Rahman died at Apollo Hospital in Dhaka on 16 February 2020 at the age of 80. He was survived by his wife, a son and a daughter.
