= Trishal =

Coordinates: 24°34′57″N 90°23′41″E

Trishal is a small town in the Mymensingh District of Bangladesh. The town has a population of 34,747 and nine wards. The town is 15.48 square KM. The famous Bengali poet Kazi Nazrul Islam attended school there and it is home to Jatiya Kabi Kazi Nazrul Islam University.

== History ==
Trishal was established in 1998.

In January 2016, Mayor ABM Anisuzzaman was sued for murder of an activist of the Jubo League.

In December 2023, The Daily Star reported the municipality was dumping household waste on the banks of Sutia River.
