= Jatiya Kabi Kazi Nazrul Islam University =

Public University in Bangladesh

- জাতীয় কবি কাজী নজরুল ইসলাম বিশ্ববিদ্যালয়
- Motto: চির উন্নত মম শির
- Motto in English: My head is forever held high
- Type: Public university
- Established: 2006; 20 years ago
- Chancellor: President Mirza Fakhrul Islam Alamgir
- Vice-Chancellor: Dr. Mohammad Musharof Hossain
- Students: 9000
- Doctoral students: 33 (M.Phil, PhD)
- Location: Nama Para Battala, Trishal, Mymensingh, Mymensingh Division, Bangladesh; 24°34′54″N 90°22′32″E
- Campus: Rural, 57 acres (23 ha)
- Mascot: Water lily
- Website: jkkniu.edu.bd

Jatiya Kabi Kazi Nazrul Islam University (Bengali: জাতীয় কবি কাজী নজরুল ইসলাম বিশ্ববিদ্যালয়) is a public university of Bangladesh. It is located at Namapara-Battala, Trishal, which is a suburb of Mymensingh, some 22 kilometres from Mymensingh urban center. Established in 2006, at present more than eight thousand students are studying in the university.

== History ==
The initiative to establish the university was undertaken at a meeting of the executive committee of National Economic Commission (ECNEC) in February 2004. Prime Minister Khaleda Zia laid the foundation stone of the university on 1 March 2005. At a function on 25 May 2007, organized to celebrate the birth anniversary of National Poet Kazi Nazrul Islam, Khaleda Zia inaugurated the university.

The university was originally conceived to be the first culture-based university in Bangladesh, but the University Act of 2006 made it a general university with a special focus on liberal arts education and activities.

Mohammad Shamsur Rahman was the first vice-chancellor of JKKNIU. Its first batch consisted of 185 students. The academic programme of the university started effective from 3 June 2007 with three departments under the Faculty of Arts (Bengali Language & Literature, English Language & Literature, and Music) and the single department Computer Science and Engineering under the Faculty of Science and Engineering.

Two more departments were established the next year under two new faculties: the Department of Accounting and Information Systems under the Faculty of Business Administration and the Department of Economics under the Faculty of Social Science.

Two other departments were opened in the academic year 2009–2010 under two faculties: the Department of Finance and Banking under the Faculty of Business Administration and the Department of Fine Arts under the Faculty of Arts.

Four additional departments were established in the academic year 2010–11 under four existing faculties, i.e., the Department of Dramatics under the Faculty of Arts, Department of Electronics & Communication Engineering under the Faculty of Science & Engineering, Department of Public Administration under the Faculty of Social Sciences, and the Department of Human Resource Management under the Faculty of Business Administration.

== Location ==
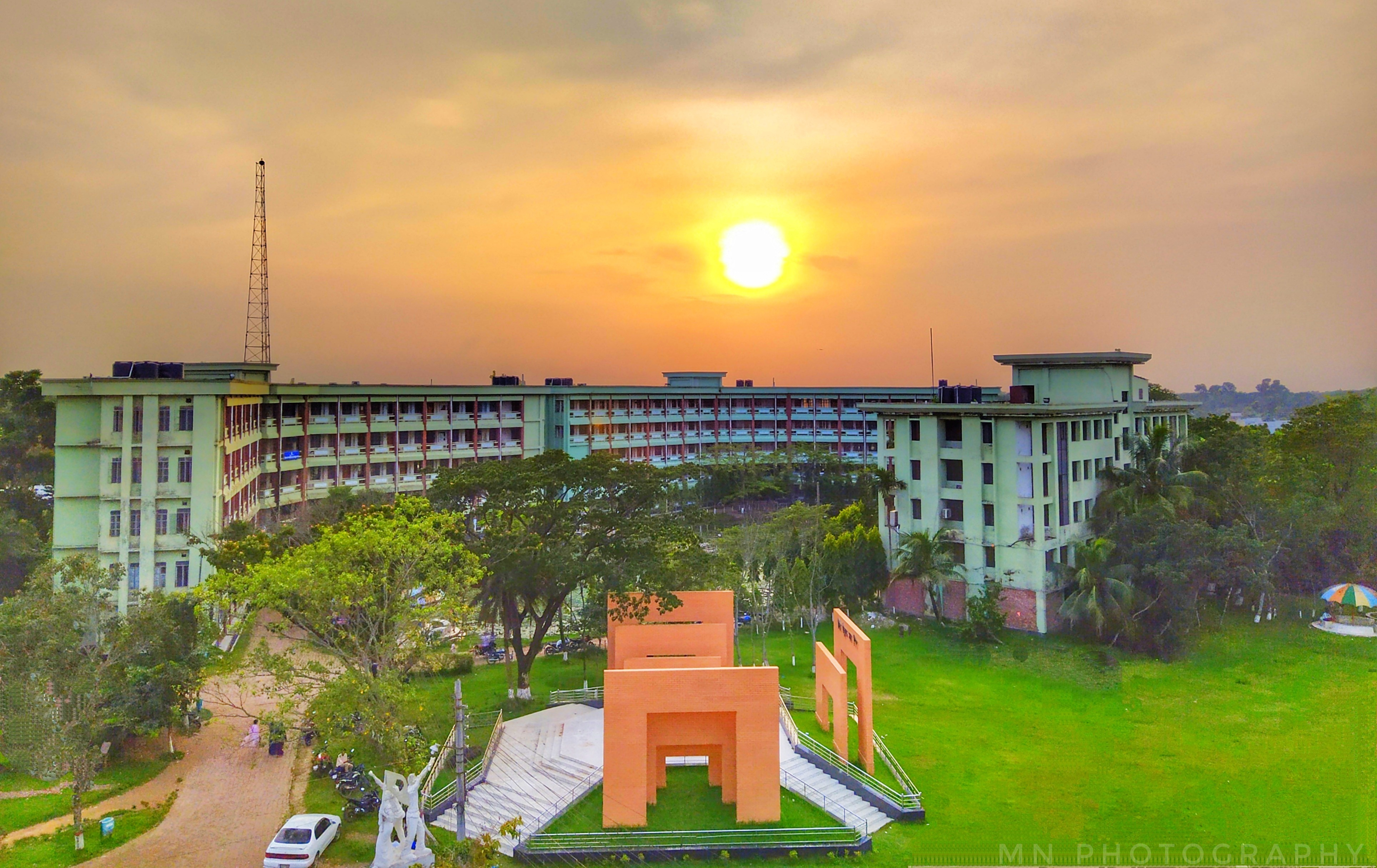
JKKNIU Top View

It is located at Namapara Battala,Trishal about 22 km from Mymensingh city center and 3 km from Dhaka-Mymensingh Highway.It is 100 km away from the capital city Dhaka.

The name of the place 'Battala' derives from the legendary banyan tree standing for years here at Namapara.

== Faculties ==
The university has 25 departments under 6 faculties.

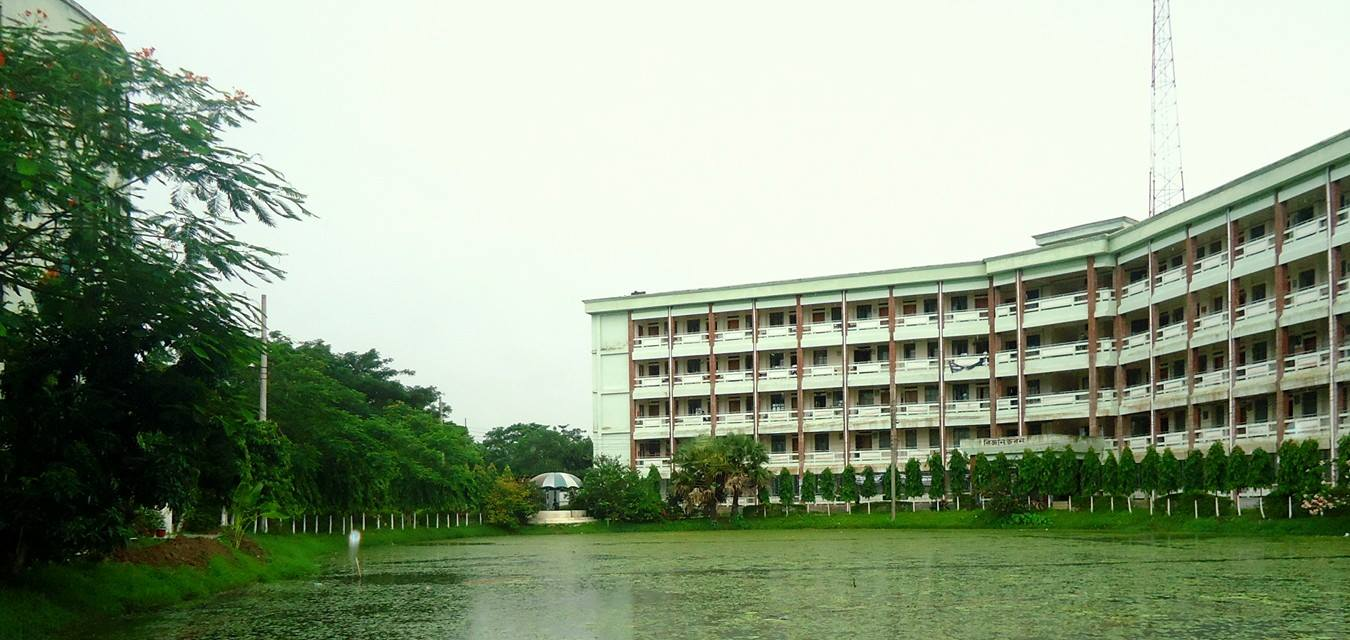
Science Building

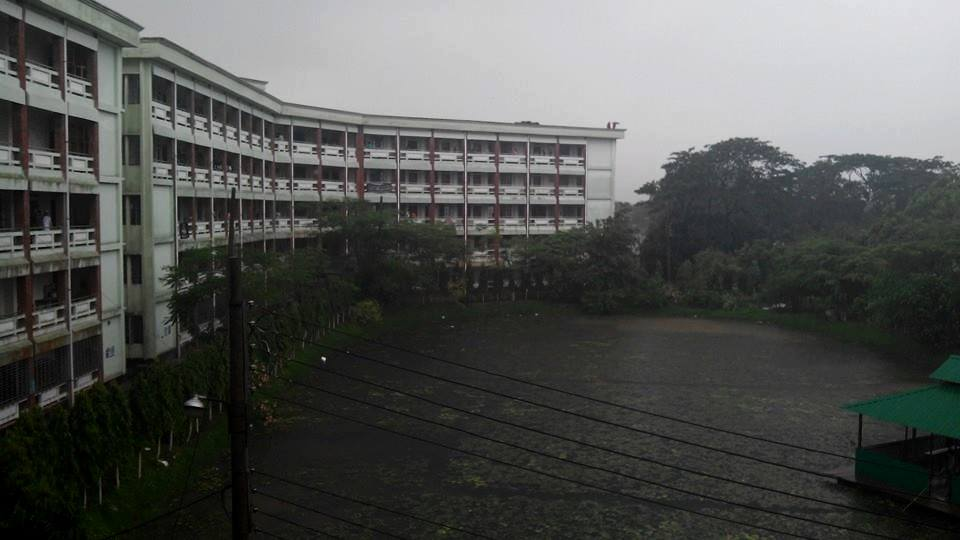
Arts Building

Faculty	Department
Faculty of Science Engineering	Computer Science and Engineering
Faculty of Science Engineering	Electrical and Electronic Engineering
Faculty of Science Engineering	Environmental Science & Engineering
Faculty of Science Engineering	Statistics
Faculty of Arts	Bangla Language and Literature
Faculty of Arts	English Language and Literature
Faculty of Arts	Theatre and Performance Studies
Faculty of Arts	Music
Faculty of Arts	Film & Media Studies
Faculty of Arts	Philosophy
Faculty of Arts	History
Faculty of Business Administration	Accounting and Information Systems
Faculty of Business Administration	Finance and Banking
Faculty of Business Administration	Human Resource Management
Faculty of Business Administration	Management
Faculty of Business Administration	Marketing
Faculty of Social Science	Economics
Faculty of Social Science	Public Administration & Governance Studies
Faculty of Social Science	Local Government and Urban Development
Faculty of Social Science	Folklore
Faculty of Social Science	Anthropology
Faculty of Social Science	Population Sciences
Faculty of Social Science	Sociology
Faculty of Fine Arts	Fine Arts
Faculty of Law	Law & Justice

== Institute ==
The university has an institute called 'Institute of Nazrul Studies' and an Institutional Quality Assurance Cell (IQAC).

== Academic buildings ==
The university has six academic buildings for conducting academic activities. The buildings are

1. Arts Building
2. Old Science building
3. Social Science Building
4. Business Administration Building
5. New Science Building
6. New Arts Building

== Residential Halls ==
1. Agnibeena Hall
2. Doloncapa Hall
3. Bidrohi Hall
4. Shiulimala Hall

== Notable research ==
Ashraf Ali Seddique, departmental head of the Department of Environmental Science and Engineering and his team found high levels of uranium in Cox's Bazar.

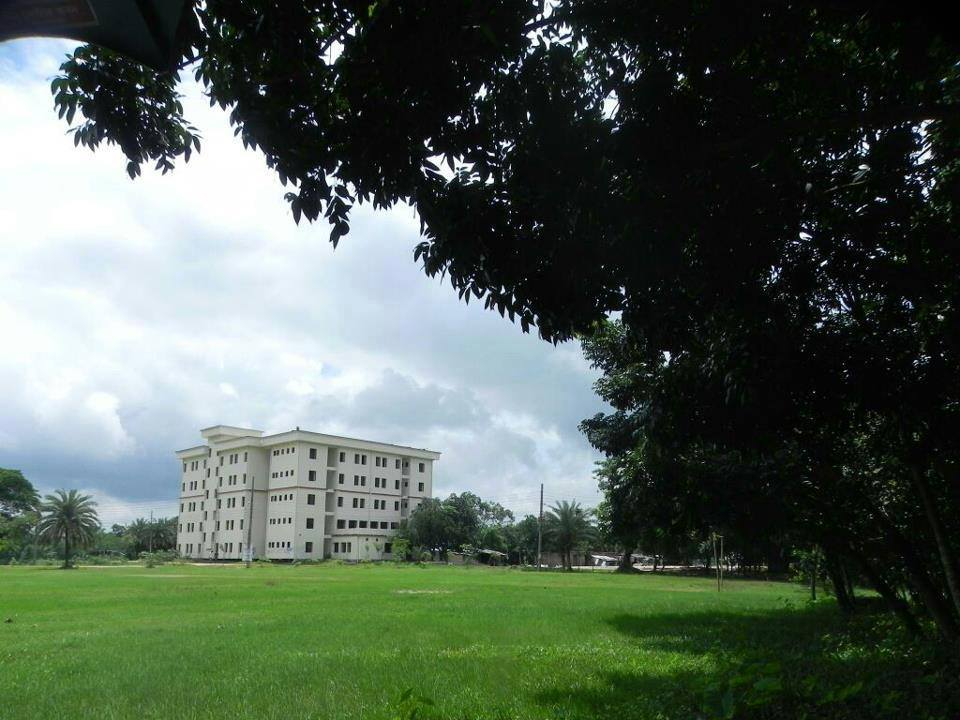
Agnibeena Hall

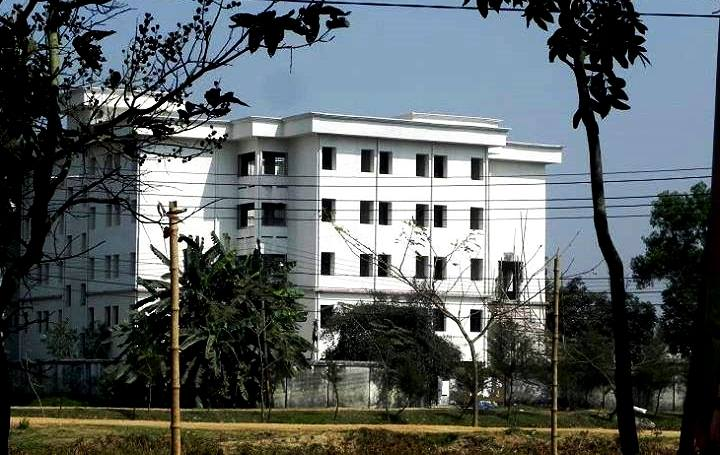
Doloncapa Hall

== Notable faculty and alumni ==
Faculty:

- Jatin Sarkar (writer, thinker, honorary guest teacher at the university)
- Khondakar Ashraf Hossain (poet, translator, 3rd VC of the university)
- Mohit Ul Alam (writer, Shakespearian scholar, 4th VC of the university)
- Soumitra Sekhar Dey, (researcher, writer. the 6th VC of the university)
- Brindaban Das (actor, TV director, guest lecturer of the theatre dept.)
- Manoj Pramanik (actor, film producer, assistant professor of the film and media studies dept.)

Alumni:

- Fazle Hasan Shishir (film producer, alumni of English dept.)
- Animes Roy (Folk singer)

== Cultural activities ==
Various types of cultural events are held on campus. The birthday of Nazrul is the biggest cultural program of JKKNIU. Every year a two-day long cultural festival is arranged under the name Kuyasha Utshab. There were many segments like photography exhibition, painting exhibition, bookstall, indigenous traditional product stall, film show, recitation, literary debate and musical nights with famous and student band of the university that made a unique impression.

The university arranges Nazrul and Rabindranath's birthday celebration every year. Radio JKKNIU is the student-run radio station on the Jatiya Kabi Kazi Nazrul Islam University campus.

== List of vice-chancellors ==
Name	From	To
M. Shamsur Ra hman	7 June 2006	19 April 2009
Syed Gias Uddin	22-April-2009	21-April-2013
Khondakar Ashraf Hossain	22-April-2013	June-2013
Mohit Ul Alam	14 August 2013	13 August 2017
A.H.M Mustafizur Rahman	13 November 2017	13 November 2021
Soumitra Sekhar Dey	15 December 2021	14 August 2024
Md Jahangir Alam	19 September 2024	Present

== Gallery ==
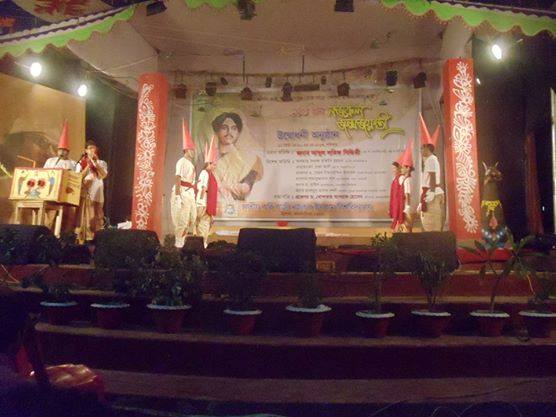
Gahi Sammer Gan Moncho

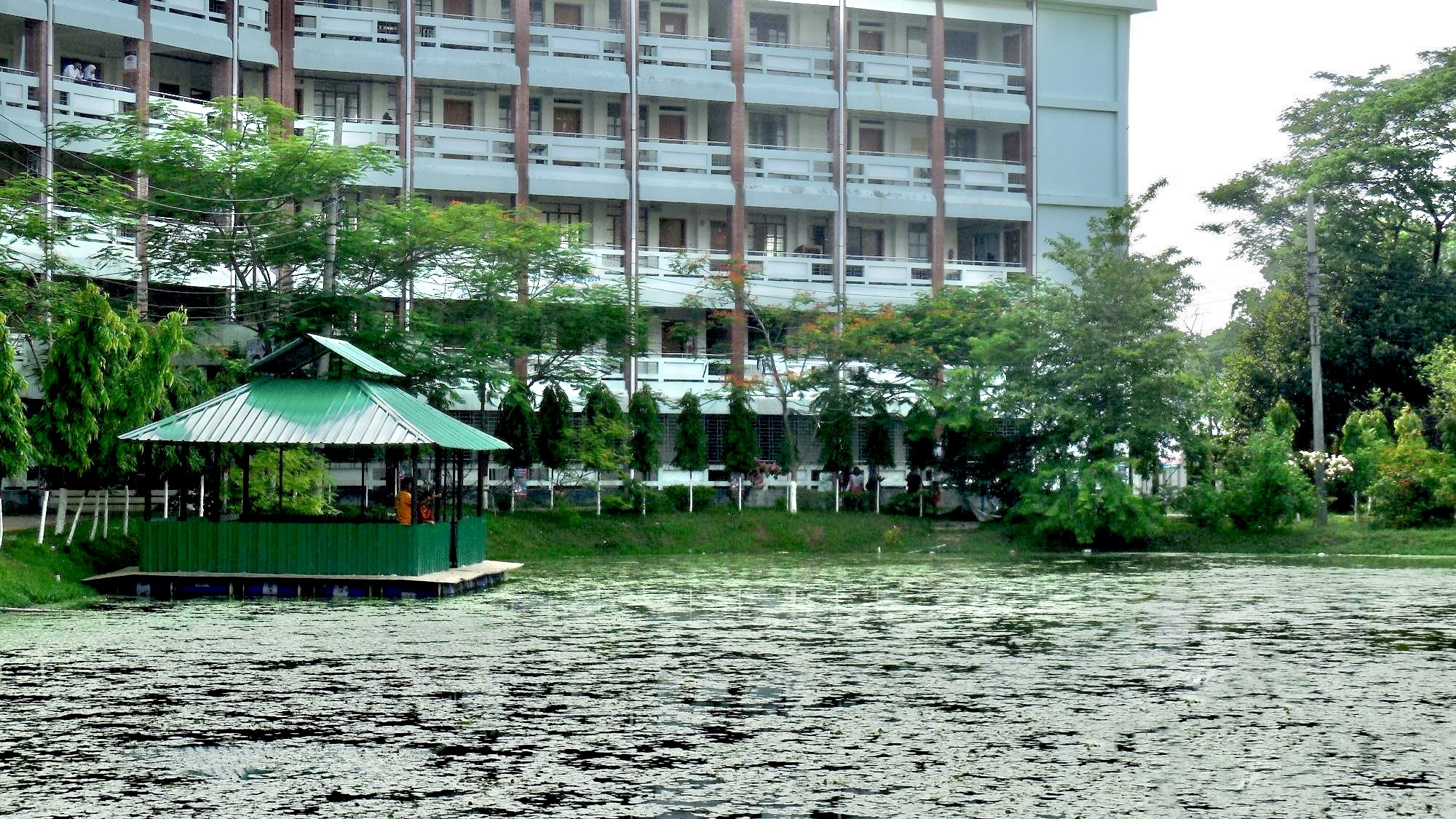
Floating Cafeteria SINDHU SAROS
