= Abdul Matin Sarkar =

Bangladeshi politician

Member of Bangladesh Parliament

Personal details
- Party: Bangladesh Awami League

Abdul Matin Sarkar is a Bangladesh Awami League politician and a former member of parliament for Mymensingh-7.

== Career ==
Sarkar was a member of the Mukti Bahini and fought in the Bangladesh Liberation War. In 1973, he was the vice-president of the Trishal Nazrul Degree College Chhttra League. In 1990, he was elected chairman of Trishal upazila. He was elected to parliament from Mymensingh-7 as a Bangladesh Awami League candidate in 2001.
