= Fulbaria Upazila =

Fulbaria ফুলবাড়ীয়া
- Upazila
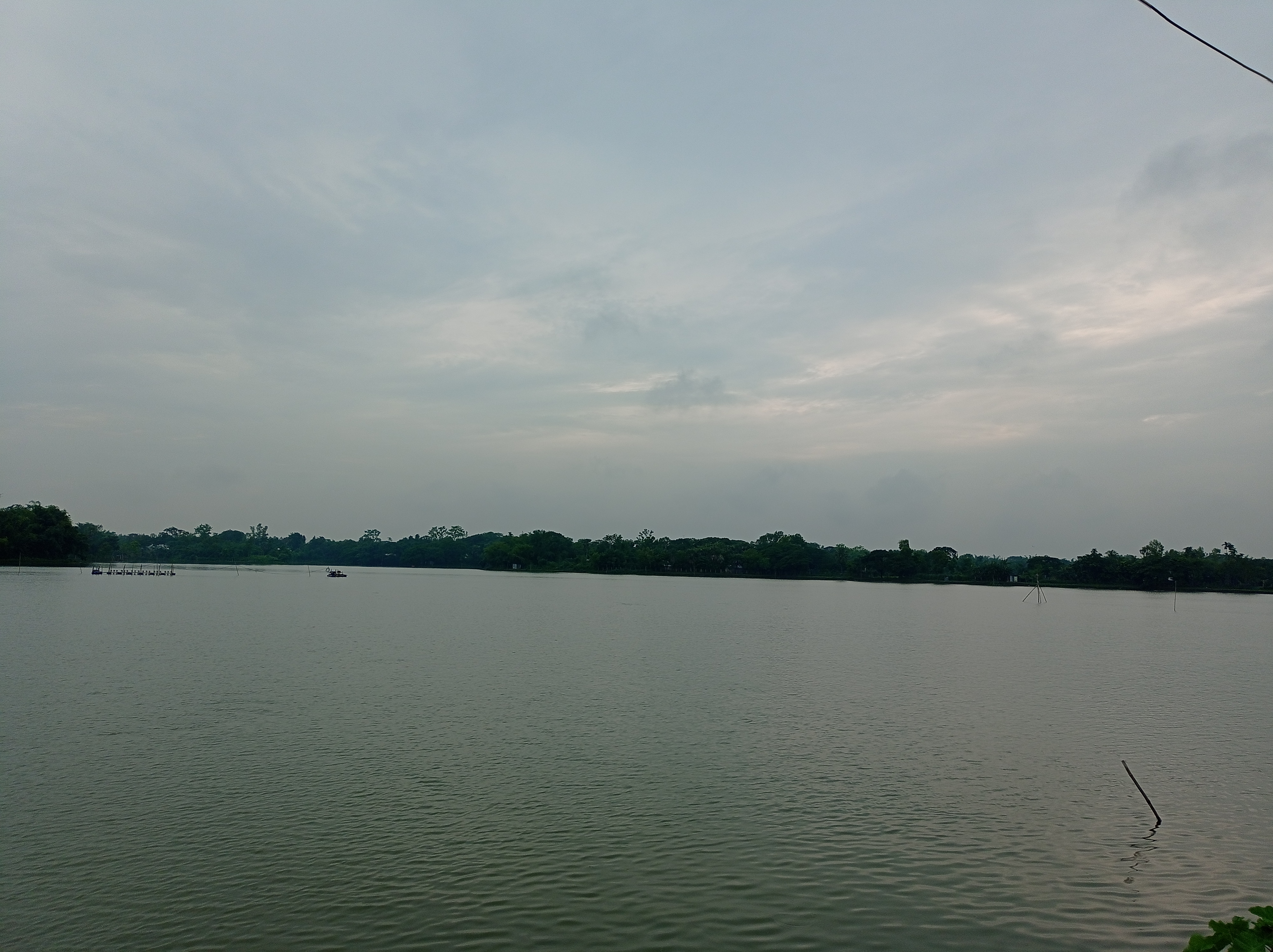
- Abirana Beel, Bhabanipur

- Coordinates: 24°38′N 90°16′E
- Country: Bangladesh
- Division: Mymensingh
- District: Mymensingh
- Headquarters: Fulbaria

Area
  - Total: 398.70 km^{2} (153.94 sq mi)

Population (2022)
  - Total: 495,917
  - Density: 1,243.8/km^{2} (3,221.5/sq mi)
- Time zone: UTC+6 (BST)
- Postal code: 2216
- Website: fulbaria.mymensingh.gov.bd

Fulbaria Upazila mauza geocode map

Fulbaria (Bengali: ফুলবাড়ীয়া) is an upazila of Mymensingh District in Bangladesh.

== History ==
According to archaeologists, most of the Fulbaria is an extended part of the land formed by the red soil of Madhupur and Bhawal; one of the oldest soils in the country. The southern and south-western and south-eastern parts of Phulbaria are composed of red soil. The north-western and north-eastern parts are composed mainly of ancient silt and loam soils.

Fulbaria was formerly known as Govindaganj. The use of phulkhari (a type of chalk) was very prevalent in the area from which the modern name is said to have come from. In 1864, Govindaganj was renamed to Fulbaria and administratively established as a thana. However, due to the influence and power of some people, the boundaries could not be determined. The boundaries were demarcated and the thana was officially established in 1867.

During the Independence War of 1971, a training camp for Bengali fighters was founded in Kandania-Langal Shimul Bazar (Kandania High School Field) in Bhabanipur on 25 March. In Lakshmipur, a fierce face-off took place between fighters and the Pakistan Army resulting in 70 total deaths. On 8 December of the same year, Fulbaria was captured by pro-independence fighters. During a cyclone on 27 April 1972, many areas in Fulbaria were affected such as Bakta, Achim Patuli, Naogaon and Putijana in addition to seven deaths and many wounded. The Fulbaria thana was upgraded to an upazila (sub-district) on 2 July 1983 under Hussain Muhammad Ershad's decentralization programme. In 1998, the Keshoreganj College was founded.

== Geography ==
Fulbaria is located at 24.6333°N 90.2667°E. Fulbaria upazila with an area of 398.70 km^{2}, is bounded by Muktagachha upazila on the north, Bhaluka upazila on the south, Trishal and Mymensingh Sadar upazilas on the east, Ghatail, Madhupur and Muktagachha upazilas on the west. Main rivers are Khiru, Nageshwari, banar and Bajua; main beel is Bhawal.

== Demographics ==
Historical population
Year	Pop.	±%
1981	329,739	—
1991	345,283	+4.7%
2001	396,019	+14.7%
2011	448,467	+13.2%
2022	495,917	+10.6%
Source: Bangladesh Bureau of Statistics

Religions in Fulbaria Upazila (2022)
Religion	Percent
Islam	97.52%
Hinduism	2.24%
Other or not stated	0.24%

According to the 2022 Bangladeshi census, Fulbaria Upazila had 122,106 households and a population of 495,917. 11.10% of the population were under 5 years of age. Fulbaria had a literacy rate (age 7 and over) of 68.05%: 69.14% for males and 67.04% for females, and a sex ratio of 93.61 males for 100 females. 77,989 (15.72%) lived in urban areas.

Fulbaria (Town) consists of five mouzas. The area of the town is 42.4 km^{2}. It has a population of 53412; male 51.22%, female 48.78%; population density per km^{2} is 1,259. Literacy rate among the town people is 25.23%. The town has one dakbungalow.

== Administration ==
Fulbaria thana, now an upazila, was established in 1867.

Fulbaria Upazila is divided into Fulbaria Municipality and 13 union parishads: Asim-Patuli, Balian, Bakta, Vobanipur, Deukhola, Enayetpur, Fulbaria, Kaladaha, Kushmail, Naogaon, Putijana, Radhakanai, and Rangamatia. The union parishads are subdivided into 104 mauzas and 116 villages.

Fulbaria Municipality is subdivided into 9 wards and 11 mahallas.

== Politics and government ==
In the 13th National Parliamentary Election held on 13 January 2026, the following candidate was elected as the Member of Parliament (MP) for the Mymensingh-6 constituency:

Parliamentary Election Results (2026)
Name	Political Party	Symbol	Votes Received
Md. Kamrul Hasan Milon	Bangladesh Jamaat-e-Islami	Scales	75,946
Akhtar Sultana (Runner-up)	Independent	Football	52,669

== Education ==
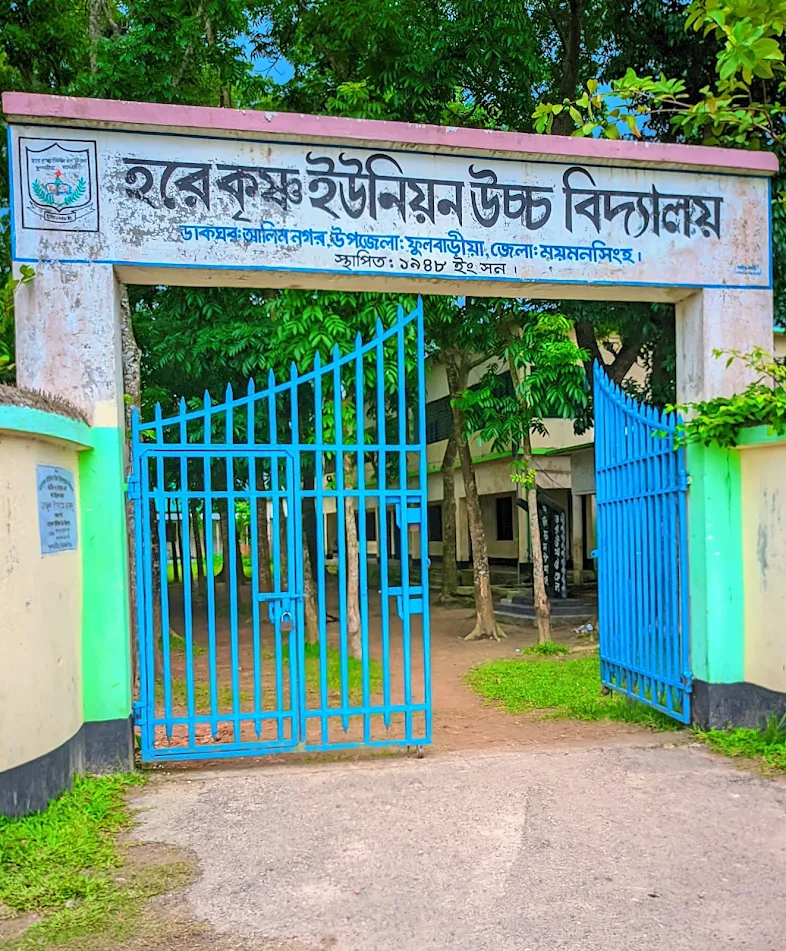
Hare Krishna Union High School

Literacy and educational institutions average literacy 75.02%; male 62%, female 38.04%. Educational institutions: college 12, high school 47, madrasa 52, government primary school 104, non-government primary school 63.

There are 11 colleges in the upazila. They include Fulbaria Mohila College, Keshorganj College, founded in 1998, and Shahabuddin College. Fulbaria College is the only honors level one.

According to Banglapedia, Achim High School, Fulbaria Pilot High School, Hare Krishna High School, Kandania High School, Muhammad Nagar High School, Palashihata High School, and Radhakanai High School are notable secondary schools.

The madrasa education system includes seven fazil madrasas.

== Economy and tourism ==
Fulbaria is noted for its beels as well as the large forest area in Rangamatia and Santoshpur. The latter Union is also home to rubber plantation.

== See also ==
- Upazilas of Bangladesh
- Districts of Bangladesh
- Divisions of Bangladesh
- Administrative geography of Bangladesh
