= Moslem Uddin =

Bangladeshi politician (1939–2026)

Muslem Uddin
- মোসলেম উদ্দিন
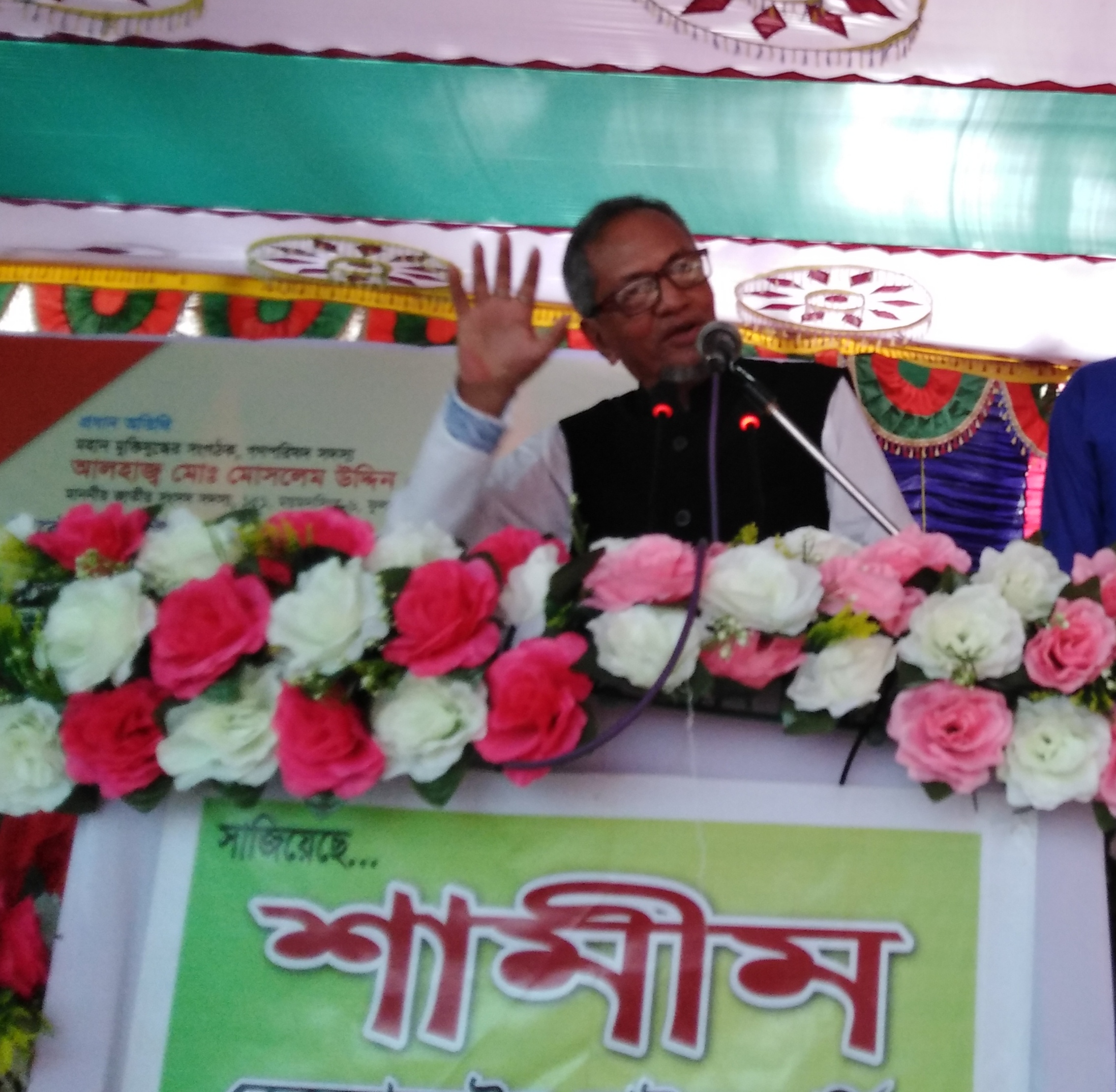
- Uddin in 2018

Member of the Bangladesh Parliament for Mymensingh-6
- In office 25 January 2009 – 30 January 2024
- Preceded by: Shamsuddin Ahmed
- In office June 1996 – 2001
- In office 1986–1988
- Preceded by: AKM Fazlul Haque
- Succeeded by: Habib Ullah Sarkar

Personal details
- Born: 30 January 1939 Mymensingh, Bengal Province, British India
- Died: 2 May 2026 (aged 87) Dhaka, Bangladesh
- Party: Bangladesh Awami League
- Website: muslemuddin.com

Moslem Uddin (Bengali: মোসলেম উদ্দিন; 30 January 1939 – 2 May 2026) was a Bangladesh Awami League politician who was a Jatiya Sangsad member, representing the Mymensingh-6 constituency.

== Early life ==
Moslem Uddin was born on 30 January 1939. He held B.A., B.Ed., and LLB degrees.

== Career ==
Moslem Uddin was elected to parliament in 1986, 1996, 2008, 2014 and 2018 from Mymensingh-6 as a Bangladesh Awami League candidate.

On 31 December 2016, a murder case was filed against Uddin over the death of two protesters, including a professor, in police action. The protestors were demanding the nationalization of the Fulbaria Degree College. On 24 January 2017, a former member of Mukti Bahini filed a case against Uddin accusing him of carrying out war crimes during the Bangladesh Liberation War.

== Death ==
Uddin died on 2 May 2026, at the age of 87.
