= Badepurura =

Badepurura বাদেপুরুড়া
- Interactive map of Badepurura
- Coordinates: 24.4474°N 90.4023°E
- Country: Bangladesh
- District: Mymensingh District
- Upazila: Bhaluka Upazila
- Union: Dhitpur Union

Population (2011)
  - Total: 1,405
- Time zone: UTC+6 (BST)

Badepurura (Bengali: বাদেপুরুড়া) is a village in Dhitpur Union under Bhaluka Upazila of Mymensingh District, Bangladesh.

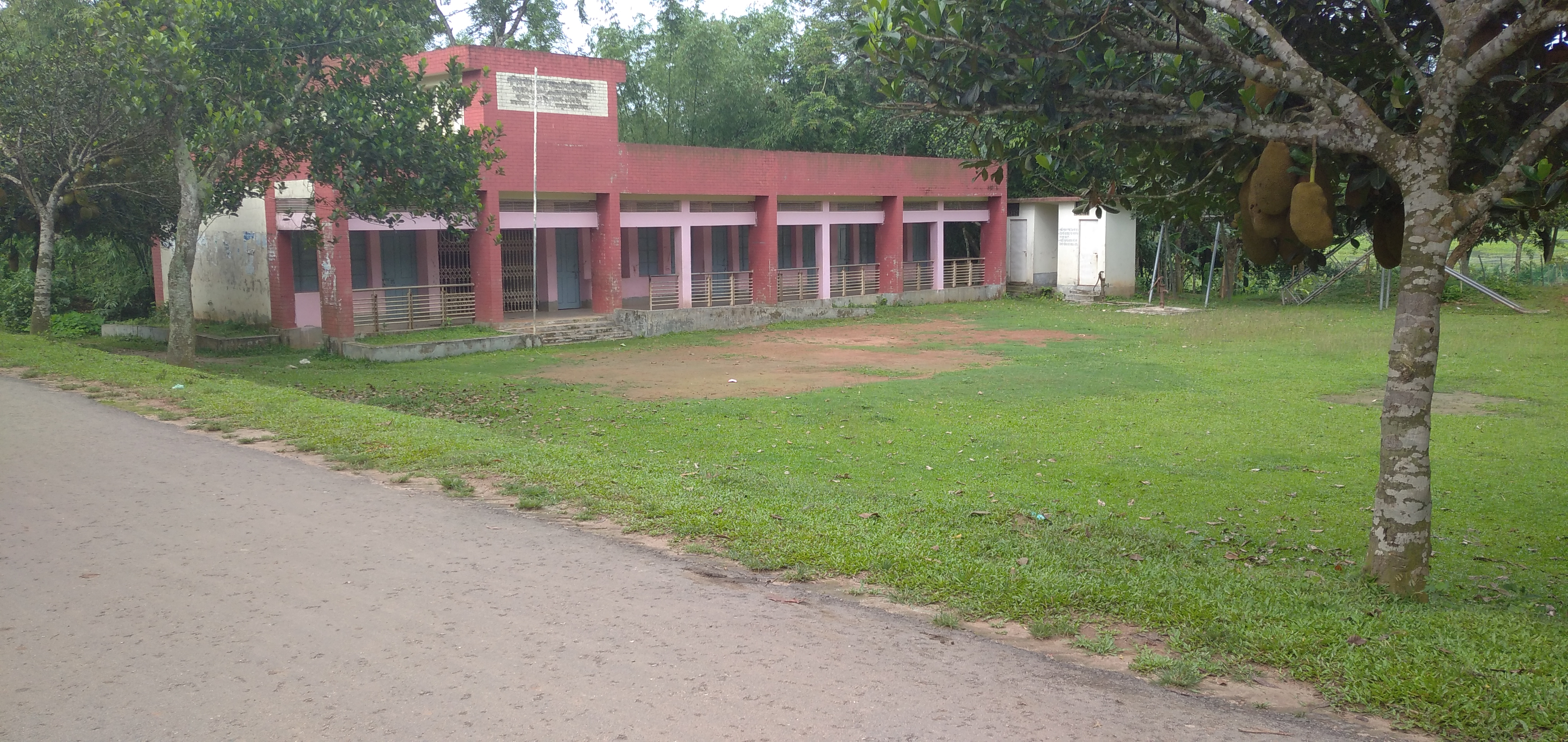
Badepurura Village

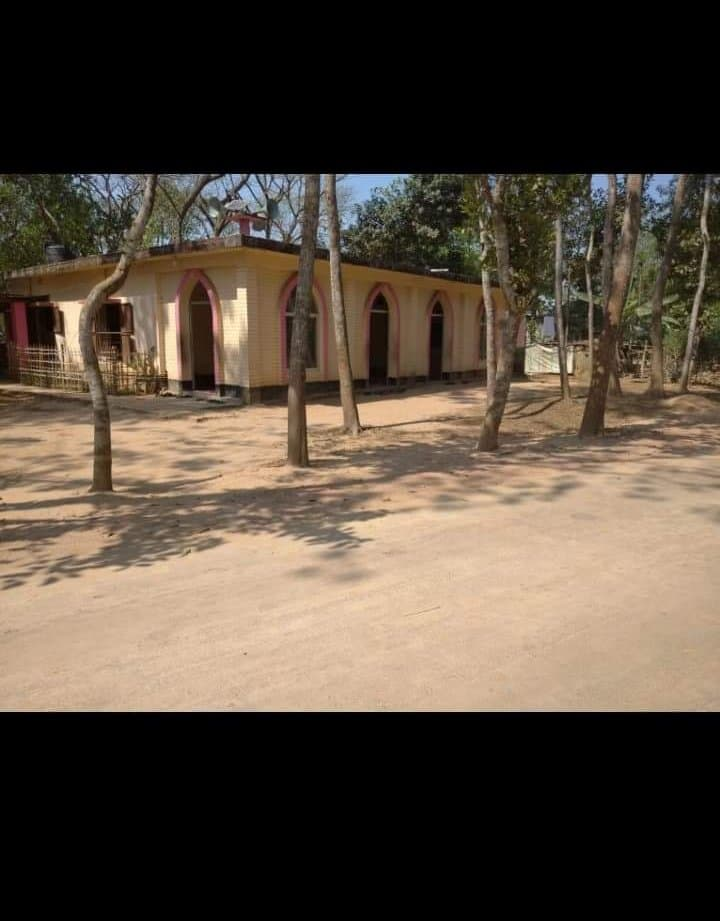
Badepurura Baitussalam Jame Mosque

== Demographics ==
According to the 2011 Bangladesh census, Badepurura had 324 households and a population of 1,405. 9.4% of the population was under the age of 5. The literacy rate (age 7 and over) was 62.6%, compared to the national average of 51.8%.
