= Meduary Union =

Meduary Union মেদুয়ারী ইউনিয়ন
- Union
- Location within Bangladesh
- Coordinates: 24.3750°N 90.3778°E
- Country: Bangladesh
- Division: Mymensingh
- District: Mymensingh
- Upazila: Bhaluka

Area
  - Total: 34.04 km^{2} (13.14 sq mi)

Population (2011)
  - Total: 24,377
  - Density: 716.1/km^{2} (1,855/sq mi)
- Time zone: UTC+6 (BST)
- Website: official website

Meduary Union is a union parishad under Bhaluka Upazila of Mymensingh District in the division of Mymensingh, Bangladesh.

== Geography ==
Meduary Union is bounded by Mokshapur, Uthura, Bharadoba, Dakatia, Malikabari, and Amirabari Union.

== Demographics ==
According to the National Bureau of Statistics of Bangladesh census report, the number of population was 24,377 in 2011.
