= Mymensingh-10 =

Constituency of Bangladesh's Jatiya Sangsad

Coordinates: 24.45°N 90.55°E

- Constituency for the Jatiya Sangsad
- District: Mymensingh District
- Division: Mymensingh Division
- Electorate: 324,345 (2018)

Current constituency
- Created: 1973
- ← 154 Mymensingh-9 156 Mymensingh-11 →

Mymensingh-10 is a constituency represented in the Jatiya Sangsad (National Parliament) of Bangladesh. Mohammad Akhtaruzzaman is the incumbent member of Parliament from this constituency.

== Boundaries ==
The constituency encompasses Gafargaon Upazila and South Gafargaon Upazila.

== History ==
The constituency was created for the first general elections in newly independent Bangladesh, held in 1973.

== Members of Parliament ==
| Election | Member | Party |
|---|---|---|
| 1973 | Shamsul Haque | Awami League |
| 1979 | Aftab Uddin Chowdhury | Muslim League |
| 1986 | Enamul Haque | Jatiya Party |
| 1991 | Altaf Hossain Golandaz | Awami League |
| Feb 1996 | Fazlur Rahman Sultan | BNP |
| Jun 1996 | Altaf Hossain Golandaz | Awami League |
| 2008 | Gias Uddin Ahmed | Awami League |
| 2014 | Fahmi Gulandaz Babel | Awami League |
| 2026 | Md. Akhtaruzzaman Bachchu | Bangladesh Nationalist Party |

== Elections ==
=== Elections in the 2010s ===
General Election 2014: Mymensingh-10
| Party | Candidate | Votes | % | ±% |
|---|---|---|---|---|
| AL | Fahmi Gulandaz Babel | 185,078 | 97.8 | +32.1 |
| Bangladesh Khelafat Majlish | Nurul Islam Khan | 4,184 | 2.2 | N/A |
| Majority | | 180,894 | 95.6 | +63.0 |
| Turnout | | 189,262 | 65.1 | −19.4 |
| AL hold | | | | |

=== Elections in the 2000s ===
General Election 2008: Mymensingh-10
| Party | Candidate | Votes | % | ±% |
|---|---|---|---|---|
| AL | Gias Uddin Ahmed | 142,126 | 65.7 | +10.3 |
| BNP | Fazlur Rahman Sultan | 71,511 | 33.1 | −10.7 |
| Independent | Ahmed Badruddin Khan | 1,612 | 0.7 | N/A |
| Jatiya Samajtantrik Dal-JSD | Md. Abdul Montakim | 456 | 0.2 | N/A |
| Bangladesh Kalyan Party | Mohammad Kamrul Hasan | 380 | 0.2 | N/A |
| KSJL | Misbah Uddin Shah Jowel | 198 | 0.1 | 0.0 |
| Majority | | 70,615 | 32.6 | +21.0 |
| Turnout | | 216,283 | 84.5 | +8.4 |
| AL hold | | | | |

General Election 2001: Mymensingh-10
| Party | Candidate | Votes | % | ±% |
|---|---|---|---|---|
| AL | Altaf Hossain Golandaz | 109,832 | 55.4 | +6.6 |
| BNP | A. B. Siddiqur Rahman | 86,862 | 43.8 | +12.4 |
| IJOF | S. M. Morshed | 1,318 | 0.7 | N/A |
| Independent | Raju Ahmed Khoka | 152 | 0.1 | N/A |
| KSJL | Misbah Uddin Shah Jowel | 110 | 0.1 | N/A |
| Majority | | 22,970 | 11.6 | −5.8 |
| Turnout | | 198,274 | 76.1 | +6.1 |
| AL hold | | | | |

=== Elections in the 1990s ===
General Election June 1996: Mymensingh-10
| Party | Candidate | Votes | % | ±% |
|---|---|---|---|---|
| AL | Altaf Hossain Golandaz | 70,665 | 48.8 | +4.8 |
| BNP | Fazlur Rahman Sultan | 45,464 | 31.4 | −1.9 |
| JP(E) | Quari Habibullah Belali | 25,081 | 17.3 | +16.5 |
| Jamaat | Md. Nurul Islam Moulana | 1,839 | 1.3 | N/A |
| Islamic Sashantantrik Andolan | A. K. M. Hafizur Rahman | 519 | 0.4 | N/A |
| Gano Forum | Md. Hasmat Neta | 432 | 0.3 | N/A |
| Independent | Md. A. Gani | 293 | 0.2 | N/A |
| Independent | Md. Shahjahan | 267 | 0.2 | N/A |
| Zaker Party | Md. A. Khaleq | 189 | 0.1 | −0.1 |
| Majority | | 25,201 | 17.4 | +6.7 |
| Turnout | | 144,749 | 70.0 | +13.1 |
| AL hold | | | | |

General Election 1991: Mymensingh-10
| Party | Candidate | Votes | % | ±% |
|---|---|---|---|---|
| AL | Altaf Hossain Golandaz | 55,224 | 44.0 | |
| BNP | Fazlur Rahman Sultan | 41,812 | 33.3 | |
| Independent | S. M. Morshed | 23,471 | 18.7 | |
| Bangladesh Janata Party | S. M. Tofazzal Hossain | 2,437 | 1.9 | |
| Oikkya Prakriyya | Md. Mau. A. Gani Khan | 1,184 | 0.9 | |
| JP(E) | Enamul Haque | 951 | 0.8 | |
| Jatiya Samajtantrik Dal-JSD | A. K. M. A. Jasimuddin | 351 | 0.3 | |
| Zaker Party | H. M. Afzal Ali | 193 | 0.2 | |
| Majority | | 13,412 | 10.7 | |
| Turnout | | 125,613 | 56.9 | |
| AL gain from JP(E) | | | | |
