= Bharadoba Union =

Bharadoba Union ভরাডোবা ইউনিয়ন
- Union
- Location within Bangladesh
- Coordinates: 24.3750°N 90.3778°E
- Country: Bangladesh
- Division: Mymensingh
- District: Mymensingh
- Upazila: Bhaluka

Area
  - Total: 23.08 km^{2} (8.91 sq mi)

Population (2011)
  - Total: 25,812
  - Density: 1,118/km^{2} (2,897/sq mi)
- Time zone: UTC+6 (BST)
- Website: official website

Bharadoba Union is a union parishad under Bhaluka Upazila of Mymensingh District in the division of Mymensingh, Bangladesh.

== Geography ==
Bharadoba Union is bounded by Dhitpur, Amirabari, Meduary, Mallikbari, Bhaluka and Birunia Union.

== Demographics ==
According to the National Bureau of Statistics of Bangladesh census report, the number of men and women in the union was 9,888 and 9,238 respectively in 2001.
