= Uthura Union =

Uthura Union উথুরা ইউনিয়ন
- Union
- Location within Bangladesh
- Coordinates: 24.3750°N 90.3778°E
- Country: Bangladesh
- Division: Mymensingh
- District: Mymensingh
- Upazila: Bhaluka

Area
  - Total: 43.31 km^{2} (16.72 sq mi)

Population (2011)
  - Total: 28,178
  - Density: 650.6/km^{2} (1,685/sq mi)
- Time zone: UTC+6 (BST)
- Website: official website

Uthura Union is a union parishad under Bhaluka Upazila of Mymensingh District in the division of Mymensingh, Bangladesh.

== Geography ==
Uthura Union is bounded by Bhabanipur, Mokshapur, Enayetpur, Dakatia, and Meduary Union.

== Demographics ==
According to the National Bureau of Statistics of Bangladesh census report, the number of population was 28,178 in 2011.
