= Dakatia Union =

Dakatia Union ডাকাতিয়া ইউনিয়ন
- Union
- Location within Bangladesh
- Coordinates: 24.3750°N 90.3778°E
- Country: Bangladesh
- Division: Mymensingh
- District: Mymensingh
- Upazila: Bhaluka

Area
  - Total: 64.36 km^{2} (24.85 sq mi)

Population (2011)
  - Total: 41,474
  - Density: 644.4/km^{2} (1,669/sq mi)
- Time zone: UTC+6 (BST)
- Website: dakatiaup.mymensingh.gov.bd

Dakatia Union is a union parishad under Bhaluka Upazila of Mymensingh District in the division of Mymensingh, Bangladesh.

== Geography ==
Dakatia Union is bounded by Kachina, Uthura, Bharadoba, Malikabari Union.

== Demographics ==
According to the Bangladesh Bureau of Statistics census report, the population was 41,474 in 2011.
