= Birunia Union =

Birunia Union বিরুনিয়া ইউনিয়ন
- Union
- Location within Bangladesh
- Coordinates: 24.3750°N 90.3778°E
- Country: Bangladesh
- Division: Mymensingh
- District: Mymensingh
- Upazila: Bhaluka

Area
  - Total: 27.27 km^{2} (10.53 sq mi)

Population (2011)
  - Total: 23,723
  - Density: 869.9/km^{2} (2,253/sq mi)
- Time zone: UTC+6 (BST)
- Website: official website

Birunia Union is a union parishad under Bhaluka Upazila of Mymensingh District in the division of Mymensingh, Bangladesh.

== Geography ==
Birunia Union is bounded by Dhitpur, Rajai, Bharadoba, Raona, Bhaluka and Mashakhali Union.

== Demographics ==
According to the National Bureau of Statistics of Bangladesh census report, the number of population was 23,723 in 2011.
