= Enamul Haque (politician) =

Bangladeshi politician (died 2023)

Md Enamul Haque Zoj
- এনামুল হক জজ

Member of the Bangladesh Parliament for Mymensingh-10
- In office 10 May 1986 – 15 February 1991
- Preceded by: Aftab Uddin Chowdhury
- Succeeded by: Altaf Hossain Golandaz

Personal details
- Born: 1939/1940 Gafargaon, Bengal Province, British India
- Died: 11 January 2023 (aged 83) Gafargaon, Mymensingh, Bangladesh
- Party: Jatiya Party (Ershad)
- Spouses: Nazu; Nasima Hoque; Ruma Akhter

Md Enamul Haque Zoj (1939/1940 – 11 January 2023) was a Bangladeshi Jatiya Party (Ershad) politician and a former Jatiya Sangsad member representing the Mymensingh-10 constituency.

== Early life ==
Zoj studied at a Cadet College in Islamabad, Pakistan. He had completed his graduation in Lahore University. He later joined the Pakistan Army in 1968 as secretary of the Cumilla Armed Services Board until 1969. His father, Abdus Salam, served as a headmaster at different schools including at Gafargaon Islamia Govt High School.

== Career ==
Zoj was elected to parliament from Mymensingh-10 as a Jatiya Party candidate in 1986 and 1988.

== Personal life and death ==
Haque married three times. He first married Nazu in 1972. Then he married Nasima Hoque. In his latter days, he had lived in Gafargaon, Mymensingh District with his third wife Ruma Haque and son Noor Elahi (b. 2012/2013). In January 2021, he was one of the 200 people who was donated a house as prime minister's gift at a programme in Gafargaon.

Haque died on 11 January 2023, at the age of 83.
