= Kadigarh National Park =

National park of Bangladesh

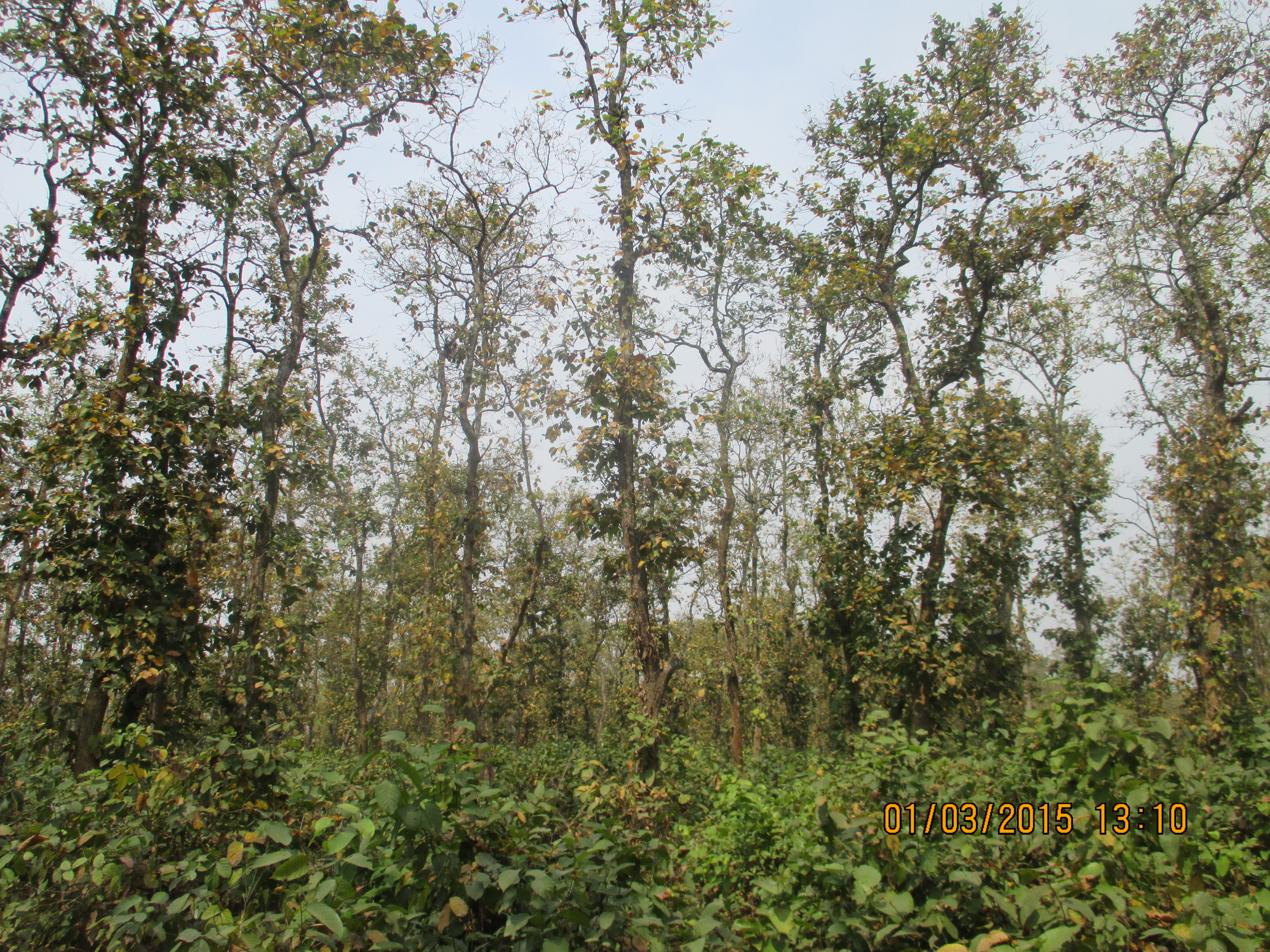
- A view of Kadigarh National Park located in Bhaluka, Mymensingh

- Location within Bangladesh
- Location: Kachina, Bhaluka, Mymensingh Division, Bangladesh
- Nearest city: Bhaluka
- Coordinates: 24.338429°N 90.328393°E
- Area: 344.13 ha (850.4 acres)
- Established: 2010

Kadigarh National Park is a national park located in the Mymensingh district, under Bhaluka Upazila in Bangladesh.It was officially established on October 24, 2010, covering an area of 344.13 hectares.

== Location ==
The park is located in Bhaluka Upazila of Mymensingh, approximately 1 km north of Kachina Bazaar along the Sidstore Bazaar to Sakhipur Road. It is situated near the Palgaon intersection, to the north of Kachina village and east of Palgaon village.

== Threats ==
In the surrounding villages of Kadirgrah, Kachina, Batajoor, Palgaon, Tamat and Dhakuria, sawmills have been illegally established in violation of the Forest Department's regulations. These sawmills are actively involved in logging large trees from the sal forest, often in broad daylight as well as under the cover of darkness. The illegally processed timber is then sold to furniture shops in nearby markets.

== Gallery ==
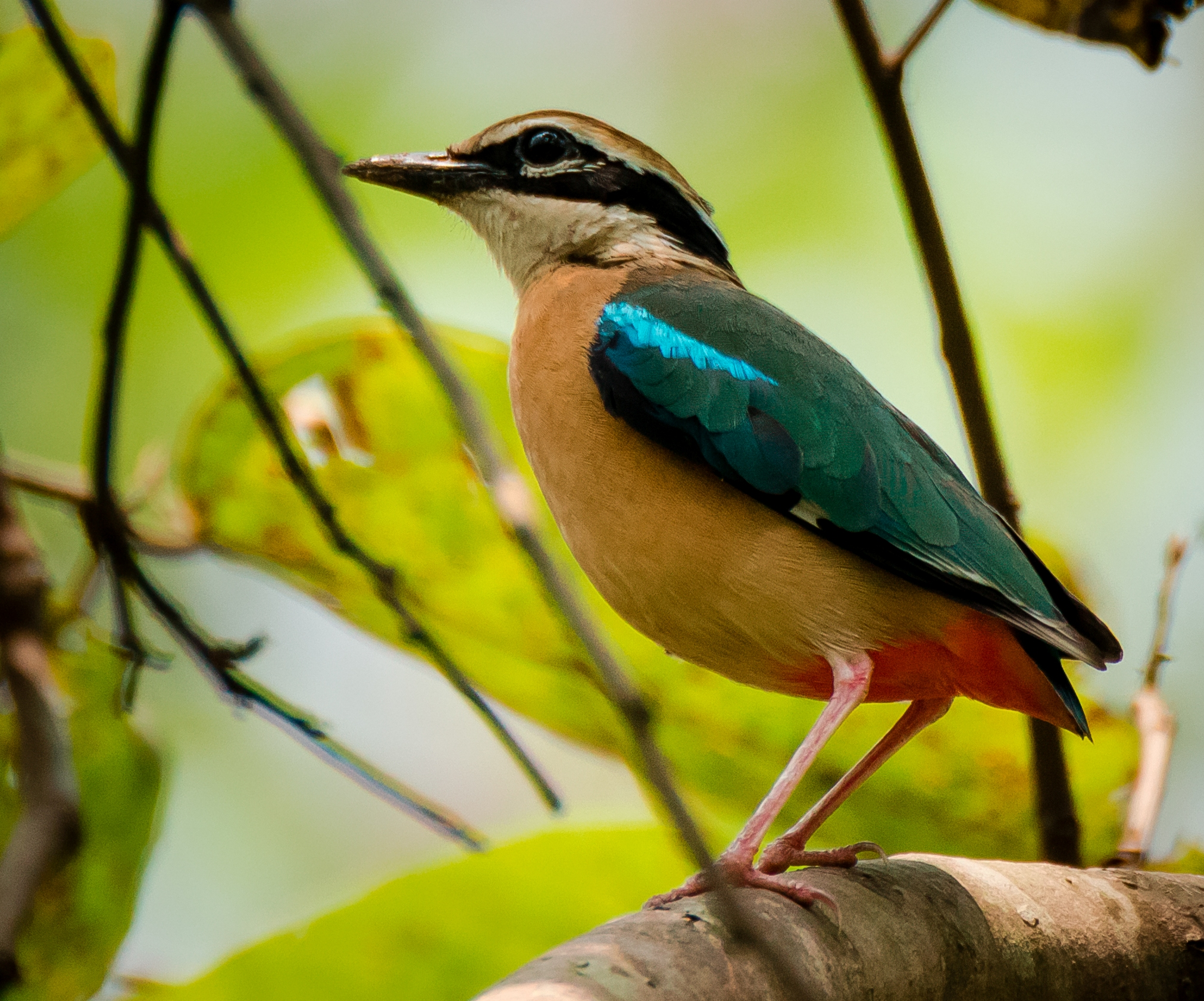
Indian Pitta, in Kadigarh National Park

A rest house inside Kadigarh National Park

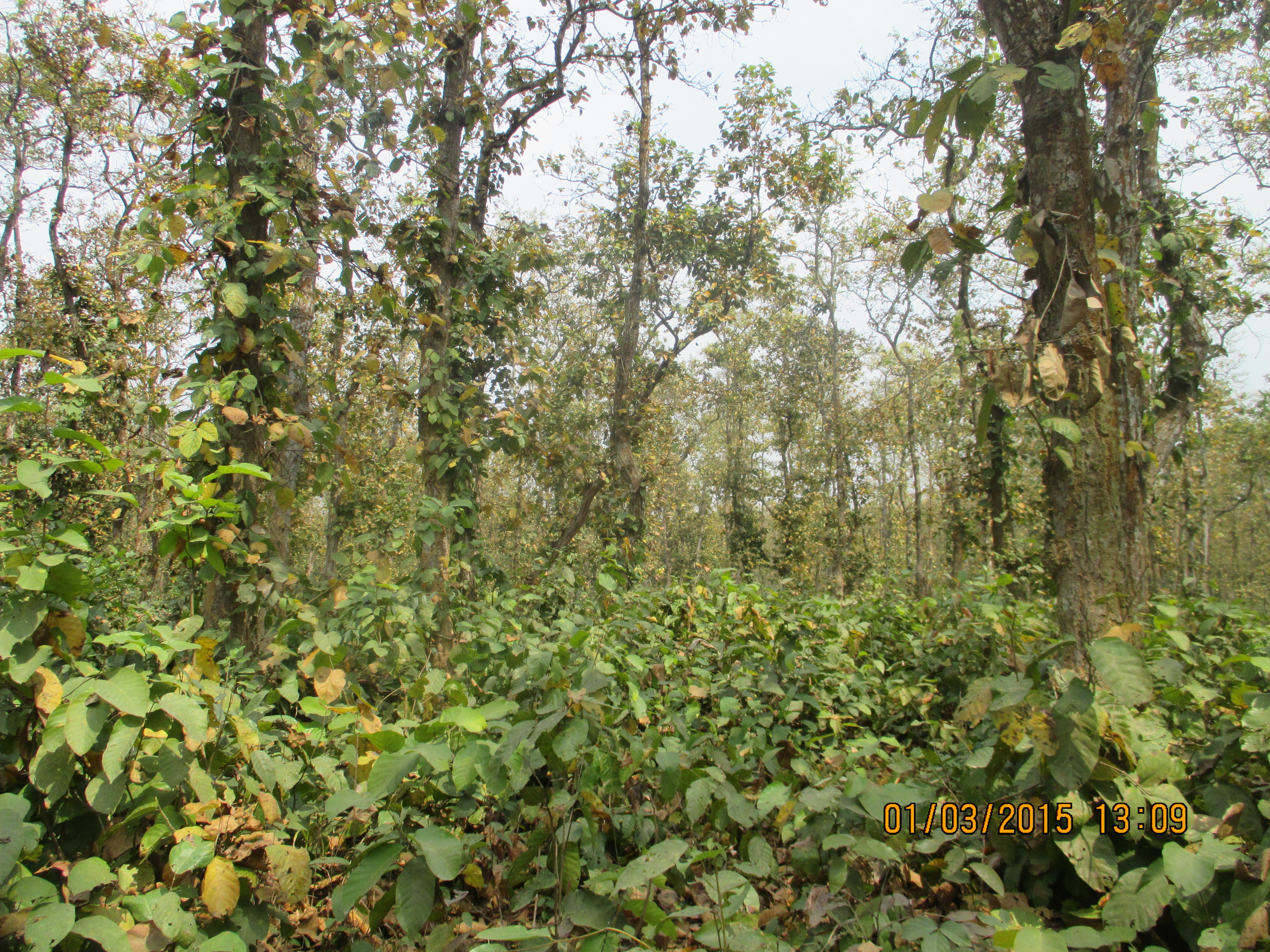
Interior of the park

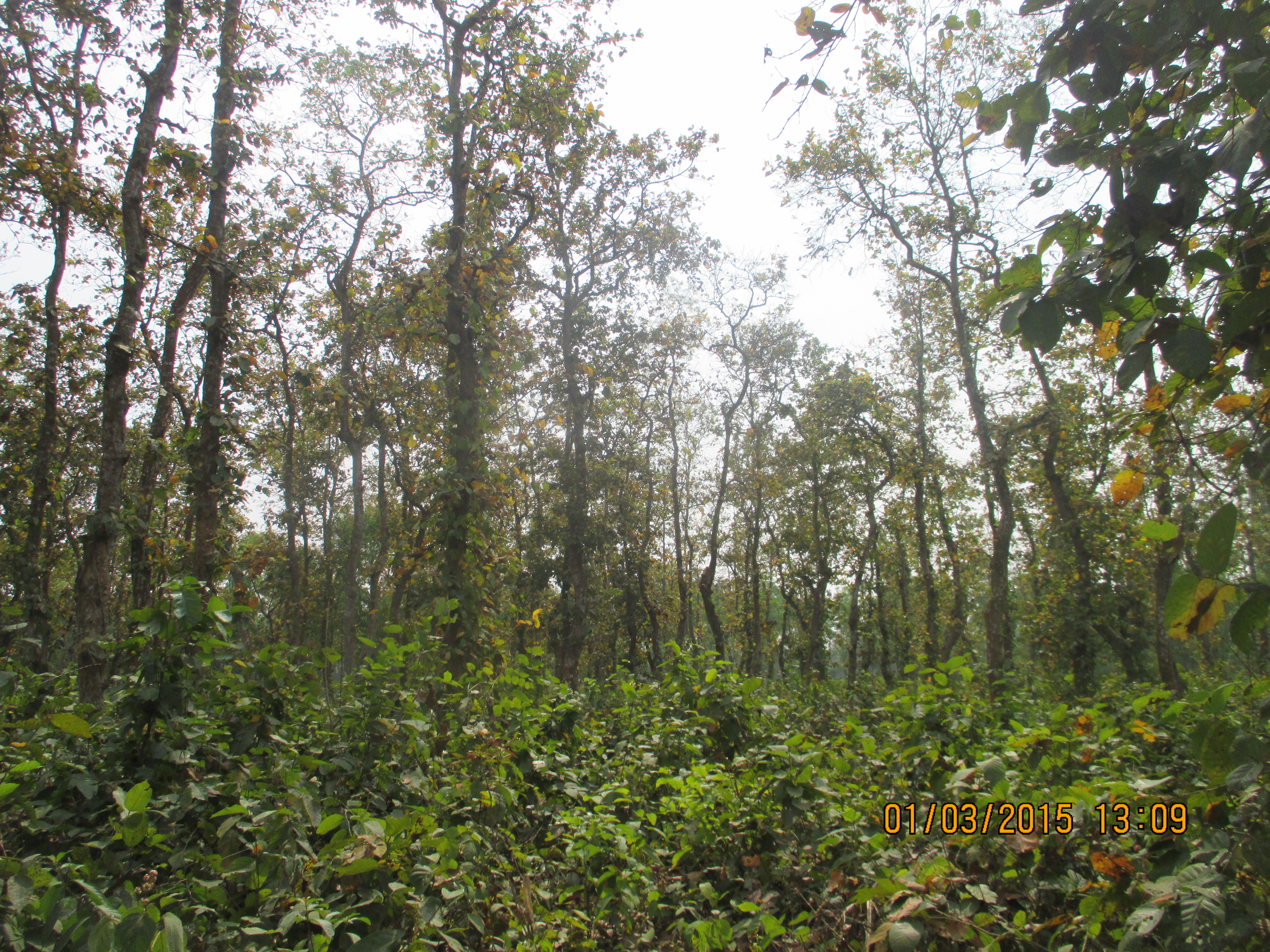

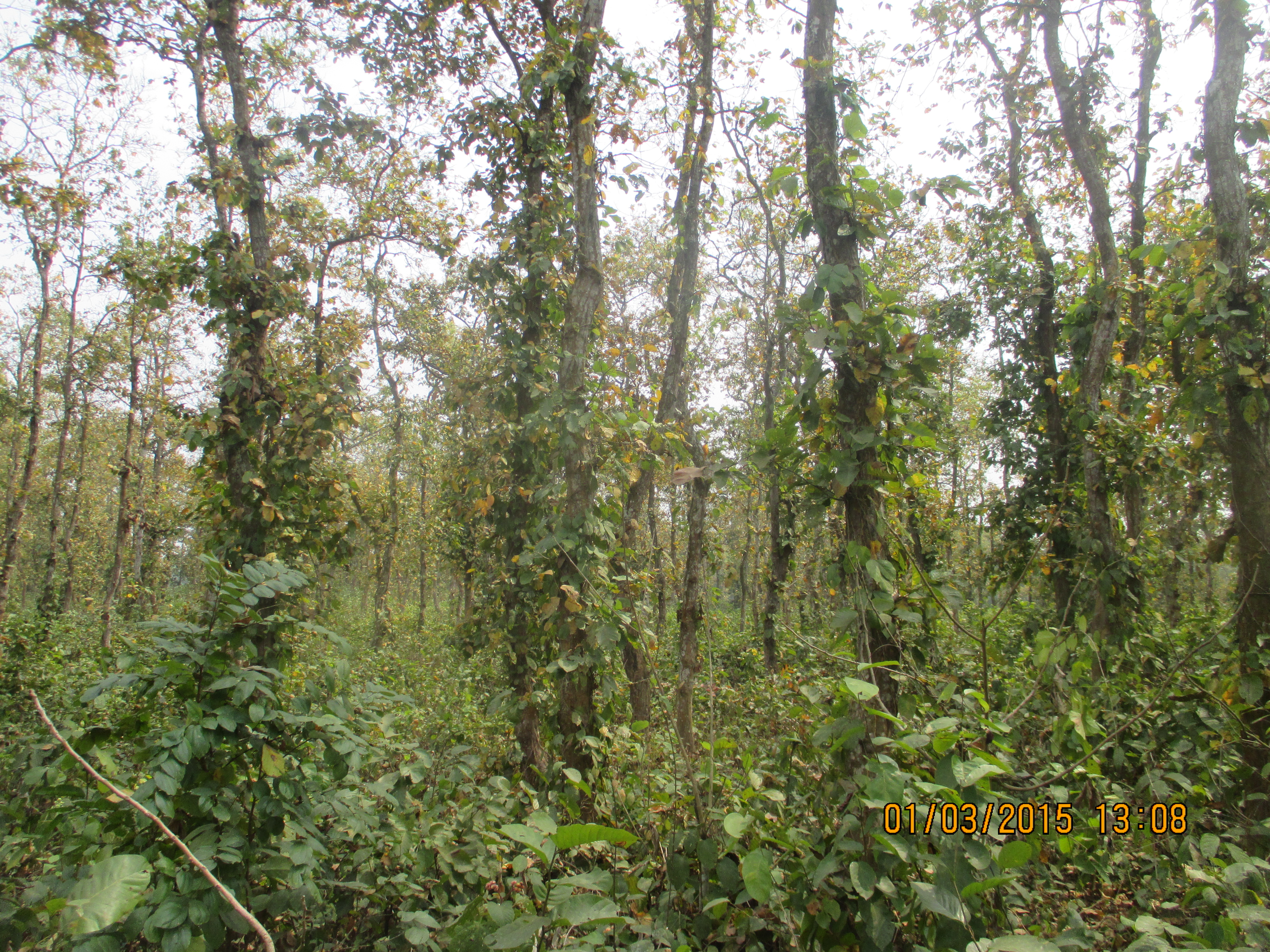

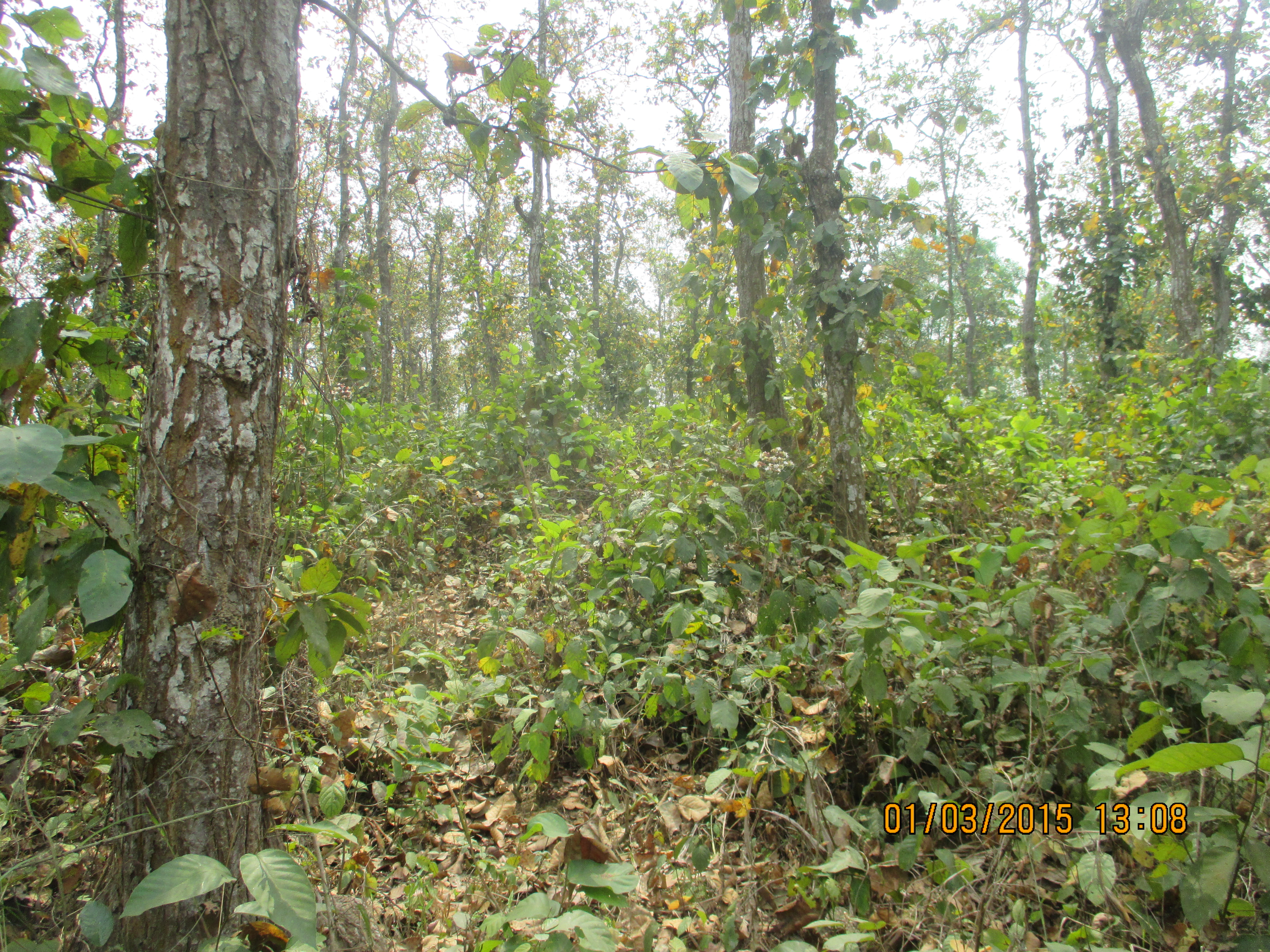

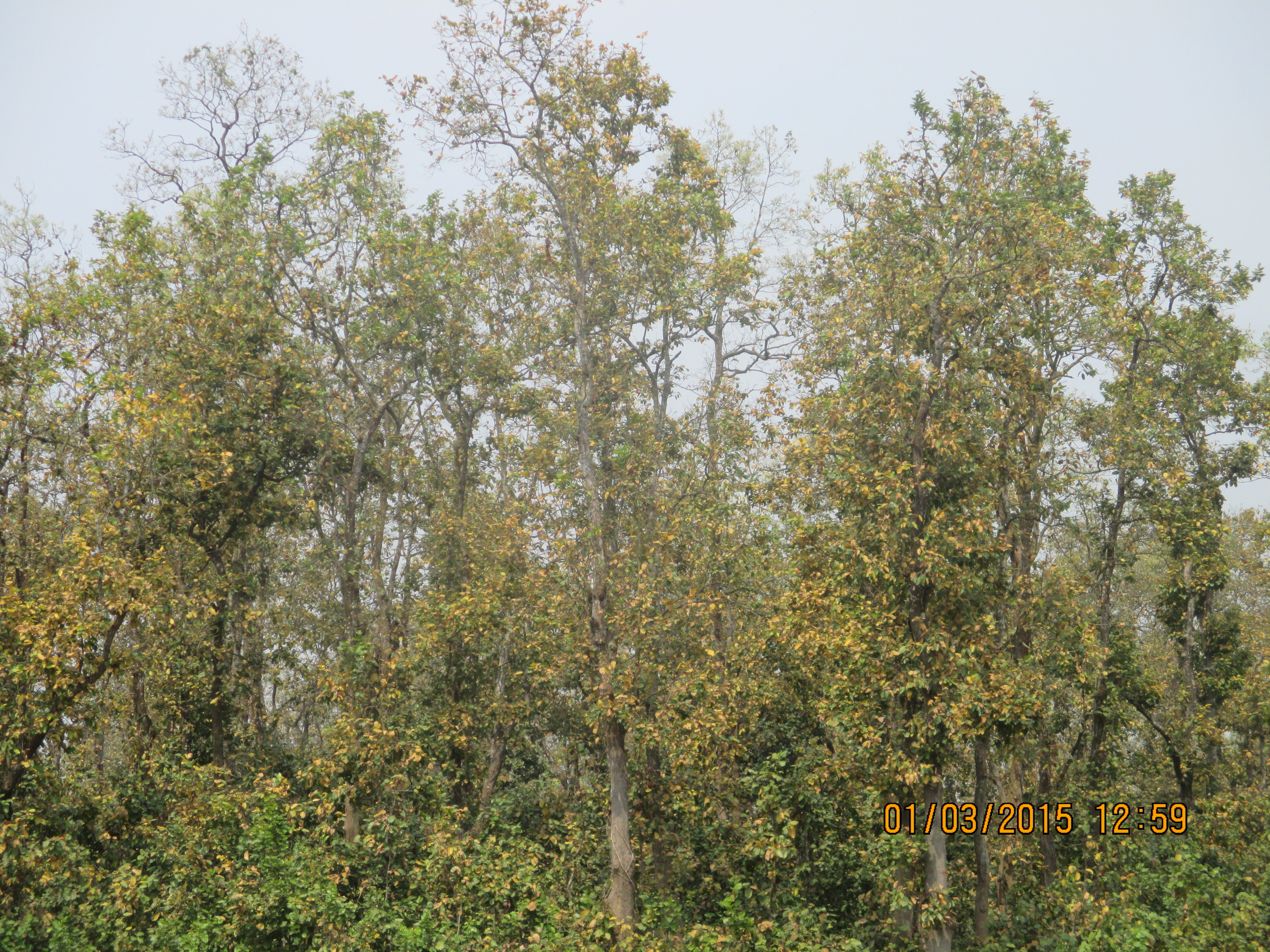

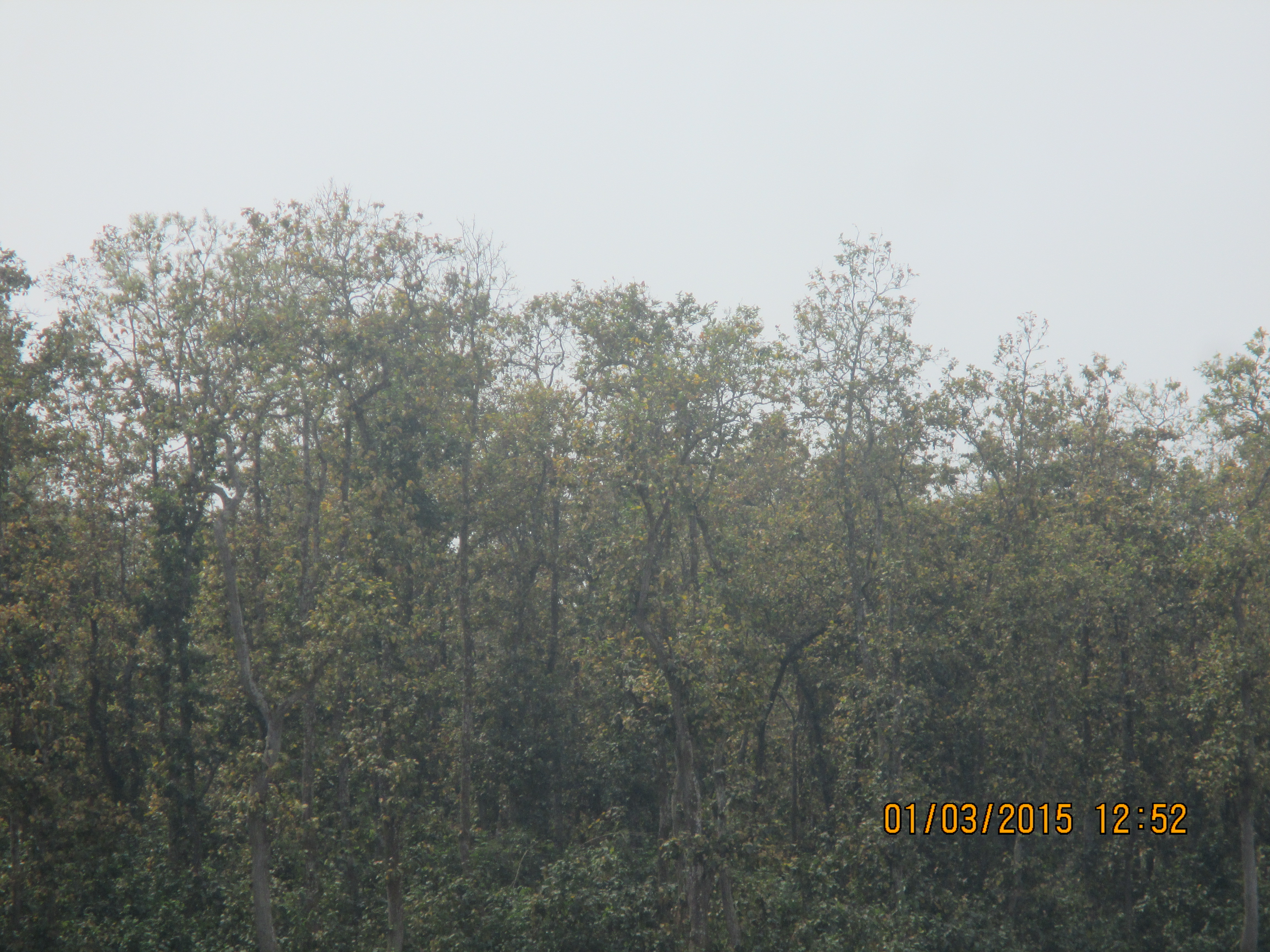

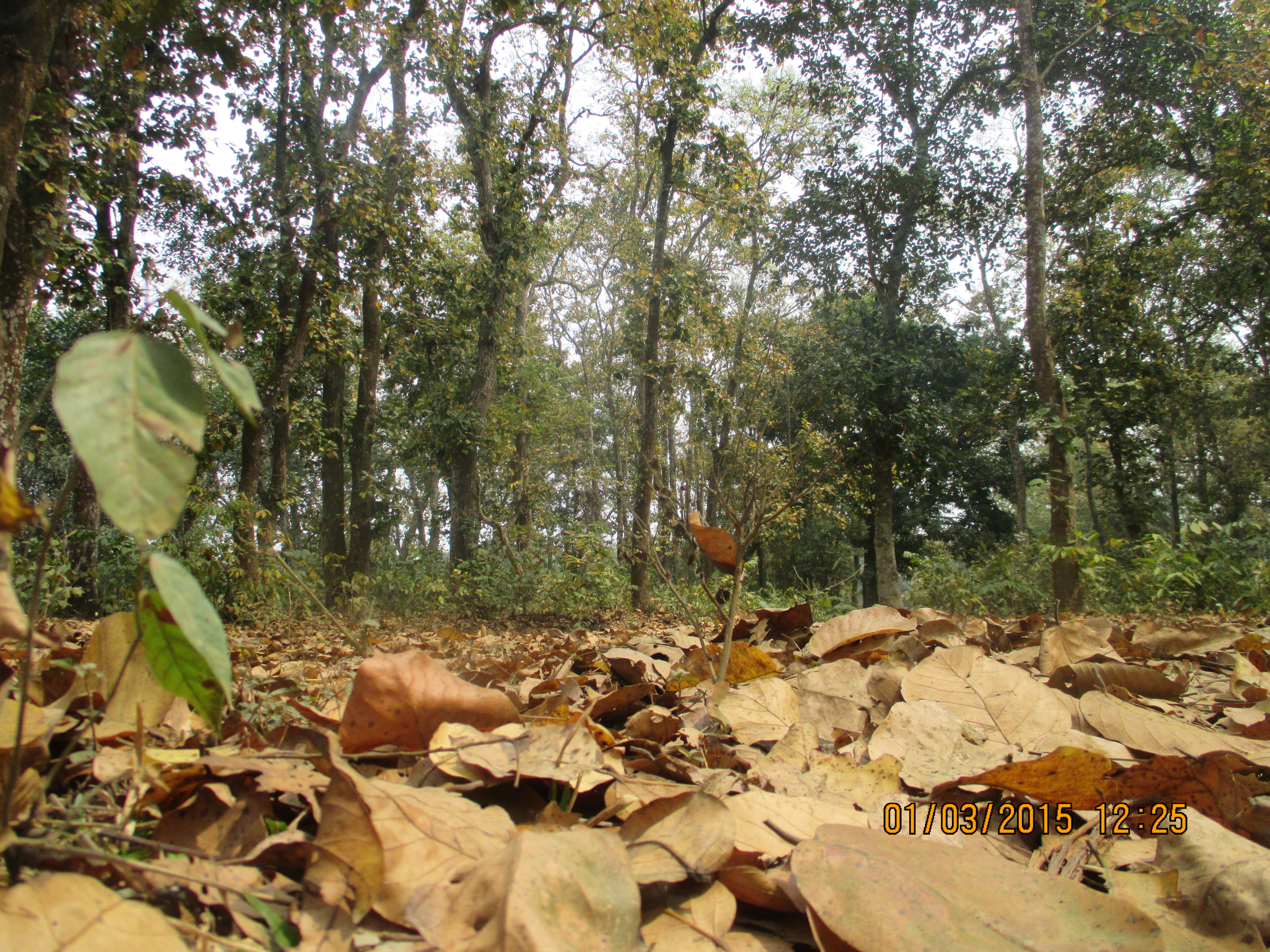
