= Aftab Uddin Chowdhury =

Bangladeshi diplomat and politician

- আফতাব উদ্দিন চৌধুরী

Member of Parliament for Mymensingh-10
- In office 1979–1984
- Preceded by: Shamsul Haque
- Succeeded by: Enamul Haque

Personal details
- Born: Aftabuddin Chowdhury Chan Mia; 1 March 1912 Dhampur, Bhaluka, Mymensingh District, Bengal Presidency
- Died: 24 July 1985 (aged 73)
- Party: Bangladesh Muslim League
- Children: Aman Ullah Chowdhury

Aftab Uddin Chowdhury (Bengali: আফতাব উদ্দিন চৌধুরী, (1 March 1912 – 24 July 1985)), also known as Chan Miah (Bengali: চান মিঞা), was a Bangladesh Muslim League politician, diplomat and a former member of parliament for the Mymensingh-10 constituency.

== Biography ==
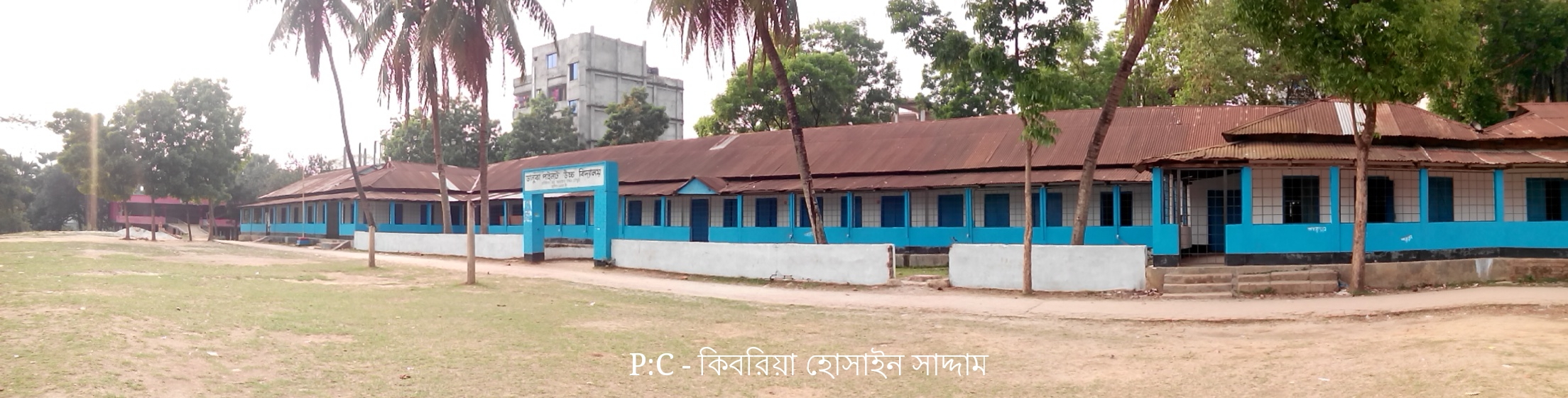
The Bhaluka Pilot High School, established by Aftab in 1948.

Chowdhury was born into a wealthy Bengali Muslim zamindari family in Dhampur, Bhaluka, Mymensingh District on 1 March 1913. His parents were Khan Sahib Abedullah Chowdhury and Halimunnesa Chowdhurani.

In 1948, Aftab Uddin Chowdhury was the founding secretary of the Bhaluka Pilot High School. He was a member of the 4th National Assembly of Pakistan from 1965 to 1969, representing the Pakistan Muslim League in the Mymensingh-VI constituency. The Dhaka-Mymensingh highway was built in the regime of Ayub Khan because of the proposal given by Chowdhury. He was elected to parliament for Mymensingh-10 as a Bangladesh Muslim League candidate in the 1979 Bangladeshi general election. He died on 24 July 1985.
