= Mohammad Akhtaruzzaman (politician) =

Bangladeshi politician

Members of Parliament
- Incumbent
- Assumed office 17 February 2026
- Preceded by: Fahmi Gulandaz Babel
- Constituency: Mymensingh-10

Personal details
- Born: 1 November 1975 (age 50) Mymensingh
- Party: Bangladesh Nationalist Party
- Spouse: Samima Sultana
- Children: 2
- Occupation: Politician

Mohammad Akhtaruzzaman Bachchu is a Bangladesh Nationalist Party politician and a member of Jatiya Sangsad representing Mymensingh-10.

== Early life ==
Aktaruzzaman was born 01 November 1975 in Mymensingh Division, Bangladesh.

== Career ==
Aktaruzzaman was elected to Parliament in 2026 from Mymensingh-10 as an BNP candidate.

== Electoral history ==
Year	Constituency	Party	Votes	%	Result
2026	Mymensingh-10	BNP	74,638	52.9	Won
