= Bhaluka Pilot High School =

- ভালুকা পাইলট উচ্চ বিদ্যালয়

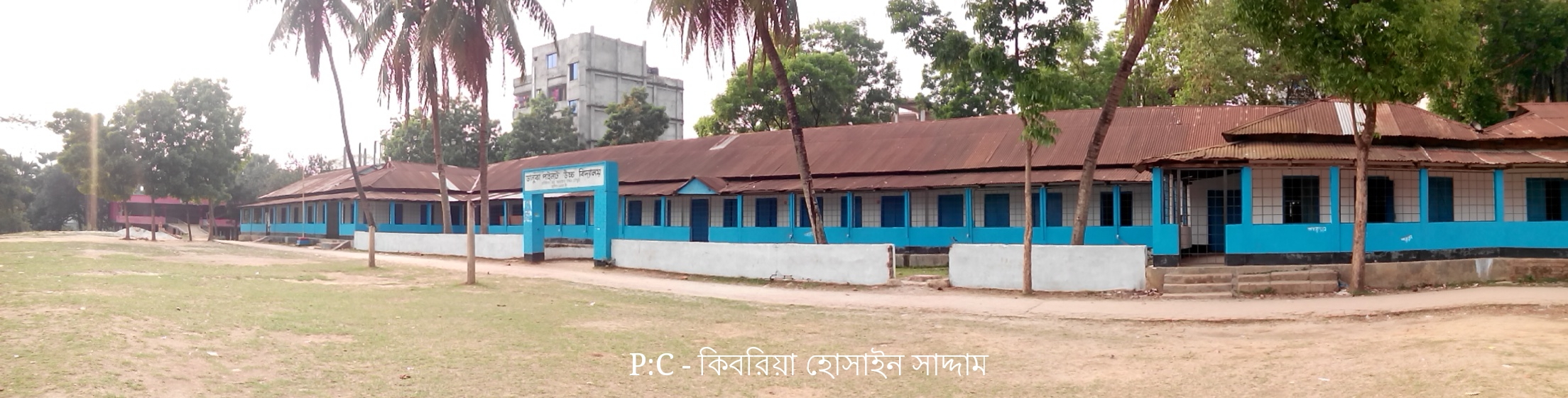

Location
- Bhaluka, Mymensingh District; Bangladesh
- Coordinates: 24.408708°N 90.385149°E

Information
- Type: Public
- Motto: শিক্ষাই জীবন (Education is life)
- Established: 1948
- Founder: Aftab Uddin Chowdhury
- Headmaster: Md. Ashequllah Chowdhury
- Campus type: Urban
- Website: deb111280.dhakaeducationboard.gov.bd

Bhaluka Pilot High School (Bengali: ভালুকা পাইলট উচ্চ বিদ্যালয়) is a boys' school located in Bhaluka, Mymensingh District. It is one of the most famous schools which was established in 1948 by Aftab Uddin Chowdhury, an honourable social worker at that time. This school is one of the oldest schools in the district. At that time, it was the only famous school in greater Bhaluka thana. It is situated at the center point of Bhaluka thana near N3 Highway. It has a long L-shaped building and two single-storied building. A large rounded playground is located just in front of the school building for playing and different functional programs of schools and local areas.

== School hostel ==
No hostel facilities. In the very beginning of this school there was a hostel on the western part of this school premises.

== Auditorium ==
A long hall room is situated just beside the teachers' common room. Local conference and school functions are held here by taking permission from school authority.

== EIIN number ==
111290
