= Gafargaon Upazila =

Gafargaon গফরগাঁও
- Upazila
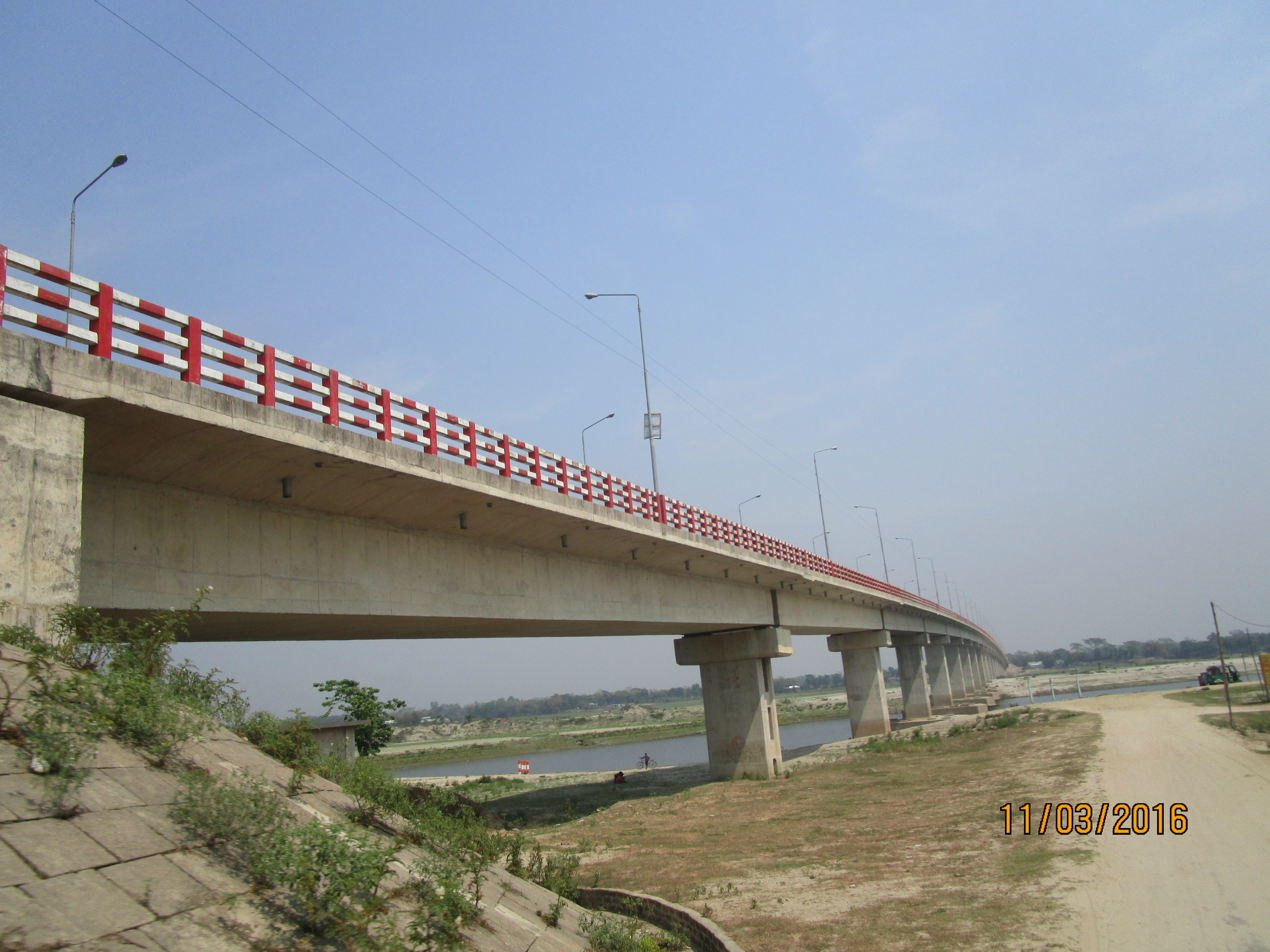
- Bridge over Old Brahmaputra in Gafargaon

- Coordinates: 24°25′N 90°33′E
- Country: Bangladesh
- Division: Mymensingh Division
- District: Mymensingh District

Area
  - Total: 166.66 km^{2} (64.35 sq mi)

Population (2022)
  - Total: 275,000
  - Density: 1,650/km^{2} (4,270/sq mi)
- Time zone: UTC+6 (BST)
- Postal code: 2230
- Area code: 09025
- Website: gafargaon.mymensingh.gov.bd

Gaffargaon Upazila mauza geocode map

Gafargaon (Bengali: গফরগাঁও) is an upazila of Mymensingh District in Mymensingh Division, Bangladesh.

== Geography ==
Gafargaon is located at 24.4167°N 90.5500°E. It has 73,130 households and total area is 401.16 km^{2}. Trishal on the north, Nandail in the east, Hossainpur upazila of Kishoreganj District, South Gafargaon on the south, and Trishal and Bhaluka upazilas on the west. Nearly three sides of the border are surrounded by the River Old Brahmaputra, with Kalivana to the south and Sutia to the west. Just land on the north.

== Demographics ==
Historical population
Year	Pop.	±%
1981	318,705	—
1991	379,803	+19.2%
2001	413,488	+8.9%
2011	430,746	+4.2%
2022	463,253	+7.5%
Source: Bangladesh Bureau of Statistics

Religions in Gafargaon Upazila (2022)
Religion	Percent
Islam	98.64%
Hinduism	1.35%
Other or not stated	0.01%

According to the 2022 Bangladeshi census, Gafargaon Upazila had 118,365 households and a population of 463,253. 10.07% of the population were under 5 years of age. Gafargaon had a literacy rate (age 7 and over) of 72.98%: 73.65% for males and 72.37% for females, and a sex ratio of 92.86 males for 100 females. 80,544 (17.39%) lived in urban areas.

== Administration ==
Gafargaon Upazila consists of Gafargaon Municipality and fifteen union councils. The union councils are further subdivided into 202 mauzas and 214 villages.

Gafargaon Municipality and 7 union councils under Gafargaon Upazila

- 1 No. Rasulpur
- 2 No. Barobaria
- 3 No. Charalgi
- 4 No. Saltia
- 5 No. Josora
- 6 No. Raona
- 8 No. Gafargaon

Gafargaon Municipality is organized into 9 wards and 19 mahallas.

== Infrastructure ==
=== Health and hospitals ===
Upazila Health Complex: 1

Upazila Health and Family Welfare Center: 16

Number of beds: 50

Family planning

Health and Family Welfare Center: 11

Family planning clinic: 1

The number of fertile couples: 84,833

== Education ==
- Gafargaon Islamia Govt. High School
- Khairullah Govt. Girls High School

According to Banglapedia, Kandipara Askar Ali High School, founded in 1906, is a notable secondary school.

== Notable people ==
- Abdul Jabbar, Language Movement martyr
- Shamsul Huda Panchbagi, Islamic scholar, politician and activist
- Muhiuddin Khan, Islamic scholar whose family was originally from Gafargaon
- Altaf Hossain Gulandaz, Member of parliament and Awami League leader
- Fahmi Gulandaz Babel, Member Of Parliament and Awami League leader
- S. M. Mumtaz Uddin, Freedom Fighter, Member of Parliament
- Fazlur Rahman Sultan Member Of parliament and BNP politician
- Abul Kashem, Member Of Parliament
- Selina Hossain, Writer and Novelist
- Mohammad Jaffar Iqbal, Journalists (Although he was born in Sylhet, his paternal grandfather had roots in Gafargaon)
- Shahidullah Forayezi, Folk Singer

== See also ==
- Upazilas of Bangladesh
- South Gafargaon Upazila
- Upazila Nirbahi Officer
- Districts of Bangladesh
- Divisions of Bangladesh
- Administrative geography of Bangladesh
- Narayanganj-Bahadurabad Ghat Line
