= Altaf Hossain Golandaz =

Bangladeshi politician

Altaf Hossain Gulandaz
- আলতাফ হোসেন গোলন্দাজ

Member of the Bangladesh Parliament for Mymensingh-10
- In office 14 July 1996 – 27 October 2006
- Succeeded by: Gias Uddin Ahmed
- In office 5 March 1991 – 24 November 1995
- Preceded by: Enamul Haque
- Succeeded by: Fazlur Rahman Sultan

Personal details
- Born: 15 August 1947 Gafargaon, Mymensingh District, Bengal Province, British India
- Died: 17 February 2007 (aged 59) Dhaka, Bangladesh
- Party: Awami League
- Spouse: Mahmuda Anam
- Children: Fahmi Gulandaz Babel Anjum Gulandaz

Altaf Hossain Gulandaz (15 August 1947 – 17 February 2007) was a Bangladesh Awami League politician and member of parliament from Mymensingh-10 for three terms.

== Career ==
Gulandaz was elected upazila chairman in 1989. He was elected to parliament in 1991, 1996, and 2001 from Mymensingh-10 as a Bangladesh Awami League candidate. He boycotted the parliament during the 15th session of the Bangladesh Nationalist Party rule.

== Personal life and death ==
Altaf Gulandaz was married to Mahmuda Anam. In July 2004, she alleged that her husband threw her out of home with two sons for failing to meet his insatiable demand of dowry. They had two sons and a daughter, Fuad Gulandaz Joglu, Fahmi Gulandaz Babel and Anjum Gulandaz; a member parliament elected from the same constituency during 2014–2024.

Altaf Gulandaz died due to a cardiac arrest on 17 February 2007 at MP Hostel in Dhaka, Bangladesh.
