= Gias Uddin Ahmed =

Bangladeshi politician (1954–2022)

Gias Uddin Ahmed BP
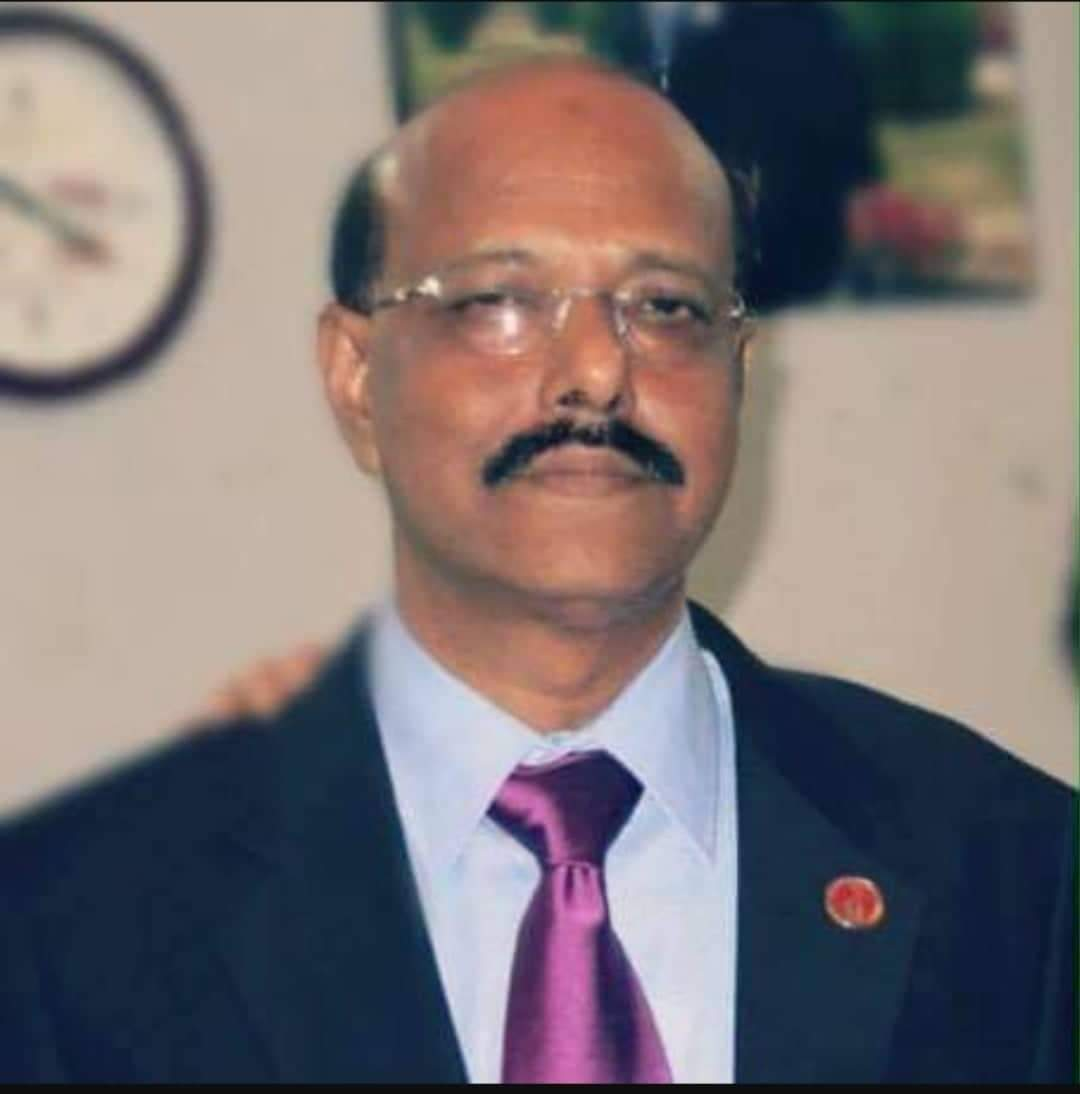

Member of Parliament for Mymensingh-10
- In office 2008–2014
- Preceded by: Altaf Hossain Golandaz
- Succeeded by: Fahmi Gulandaz Babel

Personal details
- Born: 9 May 1954 Mymensingh, East Bengal, Pakistan
- Died: 5 September 2022 (aged 68) Faridabad, India
- Party: Bangladesh Awami League
- Awards: Bir Protik

Military service
- Allegiance: Bangladesh
- Branch/service: Bangladesh Army
- Years of service: 1975—1981
- Rank: Captain
- Unit: East Bengal Regiment
- Battles/wars: Bangladesh Liberation War

Gias Uddin Ahmed (9 May 1954 – 5 September 2022) was a politician of the Awami League, and officer of the Bangladesh Army, and member of parliament for Mymensingh-10.

== Career ==
Ahmed fought in the Bangladesh War of Independence.

Ahmed was arrested in 1981 for being involved in the assassination of Ziaur Rahman, president of Bangladesh.

Ahmed was elected to Parliament in 2008 from Mymensingh-10 as an Awami League candidate. He had received 142,126 votes, while his nearest rival from the Bangladesh Nationalist Party, Fazlur Rahman Sultan, had received 71,511 votes. He served in the Parliamentary Standing Committee on the Ministry of Chittagong Hill Tracts Affairs and the Parliamentary Standing Committee on the Ministry of Environment, Forest and Climate Change.

On 18 May 2012, Ahmed shot at protestors from his licensed gun in Mymensingh. He remained unpopular with local Awami League activists.

In January 2013, Ahmed had threatened to shoot two officers of the Ministry of Education over delaying the photocopying of some documents. He reportedly said, "You better know I'm a death row convict in Ziaur Rahman killing case. You must do my task whenever it comes. Even then, the buggers make delay". He had to the secretariat to meet Afsarul Ameen, the minister for primary and mass education.

Ahmed did not receive the Awami League nomination for Mymensingh-10 for the 2014 general election; the nomination went to Fahmi Gulandaz Babel, son of Altaf Hossain Golandaz. He did not receive the nomination due to various controversies.

== Death ==
Ahmed died on 5 September 2022 at the Asian Institute of Medical Sciences in Faridabad, India.
