= Dhitpur Union =

Dhitpur Union ধীতপুর ইউনিয়ন
- Union
- Location within Bangladesh
- Coordinates: 24.3750°N 90.3778°E
- Country: Bangladesh
- Division: Mymensingh
- District: Mymensingh
- Upazila: Bhaluka

Area
  - Total: 23.24 km^{2} (8.97 sq mi)

Population (2011)
  - Total: 22,009
  - Density: 947.0/km^{2} (2,453/sq mi)
- Time zone: UTC+6 (BST)
- Website: official website

Dhitpur Union is a union parishad under Bhaluka Upazila of Mymensingh District in the division of Mymensingh, Bangladesh.

== Demographics ==
According to the National Bureau of Statistics of Bangladesh census report, the number of population was 22,009 in 2011.
