= Gafargaon Municipality =

Municipality in Mymensingh, Bangladesh

Coordinates: 24.4527°N 90.5545°E

Gafargaon Municipality গফরগাঁও পৌরসভা
- Municipality
- Interactive map of Gafargaon Municipality

Area
  - Total: 5.33 km^{2} (2.06 sq mi)

Population
  - Total: 39,973

Gafargaon Municipality (Bengali: গফরগাঁও পৌরসভা, lit. 'Gafargaon Municipality') is a municipality in Gafargaon, Mymensingh, Bangladesh.

== History ==
Gafargaon Municipality was established on 20 July 1999.

On August 2024, the former mayor of Gafargaon Municipality, Iqbal Hossain Sumon, was beaten up by a mob.

== Institutions ==
=== Religion ===
There are 41 mosques and 1 Hindu temple in the area.

=== Education ===
There are 2 degree colleges, 18 madrasahs, 5 government primary schools, 3 high schools in the area.
