= Nazim Uddin (politician) =

Bangladeshi politician

Member of Bangladesh Parliament
- In office 1973–1979
- Succeeded by: Fazlur Rahman Sultan

Personal details
- Party: Bangladesh Awami League

Nazim Uddin is a Bangladesh Awami League politician and a former member of parliament for Mymensingh-11.

== Career ==
Uddin was elected to parliament from Mymensingh-11 as a Bangladesh Awami League candidate in 1973.
