= Shamsul Haque (Mymensingh politician) =

Bangladeshi politician

- শামসুল হক

Member of the Bangladesh Parliament for Mymensingh-10
- In office 7 April 1973 – 15 August 1975
- Preceded by: Position created
- Succeeded by: Aftab Uddin Chowdhury

Personal details
- Died: c. July 2004 Dhaka, Bangladesh
- Party: Awami League
- Occupation: Politician, advocate

Shamsul Haque was an Awami League politician who was a member of parliament for Mymensingh-10.

== Biography ==
Haque sought election to the National Assembly of Pakistan as an Awami League candidate in the 1970 Pakistani general election. He was duly elected for Mymensingh-X. The assembly was not convened, however. The Bangladesh Liberation War broke out in March 1971.

He was elected to the Bangladesh Parliament from Mymensingh-10 as a candidate of the Awami League in 1973.

He died circa July 2004.
