= Fazlur Rahman Sultan =

Bangladeshi politician

- ফজলুর রহমান সুলতান

Member of the Bangladesh Parliament for Mymensingh-10
- In office 19 March 1996 – 30 March 1996
- Preceded by: Altaf Hossain Golandaz
- Succeeded by: Altaf Hossain Golandaz

Member of the Bangladesh Parliament for Mymensingh-11
- In office 2 April 1979 – 24 March 1982
- Preceded by: Nazim Uddin
- Succeeded by: Aman Ullah Chowdhury

Personal details
- Died: 6 April 2015 (aged 85) Dhaka, Bangladesh
- Party: Bangladesh Nationalist Party

Fazlur Rahman Sultan (died 6 April 2015) was a Bangladesh Nationalist Party politician and a member of Jatiya Sangsad representing the Mymensingh-10 and Mymensingh-11 constituencies.

== Career and personal life ==
Sultan was elected to parliament from Mymensingh-11 as a Bangladesh Nationalist Party candidate in 1979. He died on 6 April 2015.
