= Fahmi Gulandaz Babel =

Bangladeshi politician

- ফাহমি গোলন্দাজ বাবেল

Member of the Bangladesh Parliament for Mymensingh-10
- In office 30 January 2014 – 6 August 2024
- Preceded by: Gias Uddin Ahmed

Personal details
- Born: 9 September 1976 (age 49) Mymensingh, Dhaka, Bangladesh
- Party: Bangladesh Awami League
- Spouse: Sharmeen
- Parents: Altaf Hossain Golandaz (father); Mahmuda Anam (mother)

Fahmi Gulandaz Babel (born 9 September 1976) is a Bangladesh Awami League politician and a former Jatiya Sangsad member representing the Mymensingh-10 constituency from where his father was elected 3 times.

== Early life ==
Babel was born 23 June 1976 in Mymensingh, Dhaka, Bangladesh (now in Mymensingh Division) to former Awami League MP Altaf Hossain Golandaz and Mahmuda Anam. He had a brother, Fuad Golandaz Joglu and has a sister Anjum Golandaz.

== Career ==
Babel was elected to Parliament in 2014 from Mymensingh-10 as an Awami League candidate. He is a member of the Parliamentary Standing Committee on the Ministry of Textile and Jute. In 2018 he was made a member of the executive committee of Bangladesh Awami League in Mymensingh District. He has been accused of torturing politicians in his constituency, including members of his own party.

Babel was re-elected from Mymensingh-10 in 2018 and in 2024 as a candidate of Awami League.

After the fall of the Sheikh Hasina led Awami League government his home was looted and burned down in September 2024. On 16 January 2025, Anti-Corruption Commission of Bangladesh filed two cases against Babel and his wife Sharmeen Gulandaz for amassing illegal wealth worth Tk 20.11 crore and engaging in suspicious transactions worth Tk 60.98 crore through 16 bank accounts and USD 1.71 lakh.
