= South Gafargaon Upazila =

Upazila in Mymensingh Division, Bangladesh

South Gafargaon দক্ষিণ গফরগাঁও
- Upazila
- Dakkhin Gafargaon
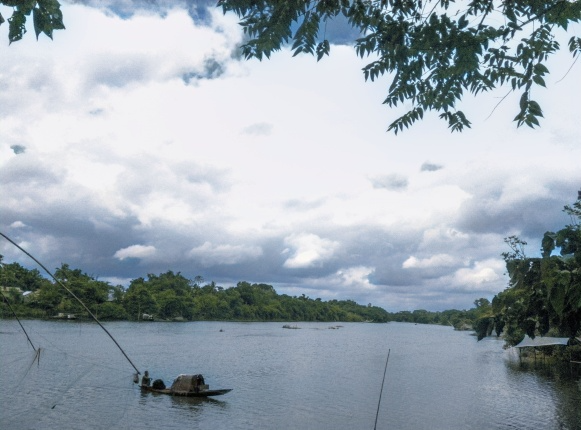
- Sutia River at Dakkhin Gafargaon Upazila
- Interactive map of South Gafargaon
- Coordinates: 24.3713°N 90.5859°E
- Country: Bangladesh
- Division: Mymensingh Division
- District: Mymensingh District
- Established: 1 July 2026

Area
  - Total: 235 km^{2} (91 sq mi)

Population (2022)
  - Total: 300,000
  - Density: 1,300/km^{2} (3,400/sq mi)
- Time zone: UTC+6 (BST)
- Postal code: 2230
- Area code: 09025
- Parliamentary constituency: Mymensingh-10
- Website: southgafargaon.mymensingh.gov.bd

Gaffargaon Upazila mauza geocode map

South Gafargaon (Bengali: দক্ষিণ গফরগাঁও), officially Dakkhin Gafargaon is an upazila in the Mymensingh District of Bangladesh. It is the 14th upazila within the district. The upazila's administrative territory mirrors the exact boundary of the pre-existing Pagla Thana region.

== History ==
Dakkhin Gafargaon emerged as an Upazila following the publication of a gazette notification on July 9.

== Area and population ==
Dakkhin Gafargaon Upazila comprises eight unions under Pagla Thana. It covers an area of 235 square kilometers, and according to the last census, the population is approximately 300,000.

== Administrative area ==
There are currently eight unions in Dakkhin Gafargaon Upazila. The unions included in the new upazila are Moshakhali, Panchbagh, Usthi, Longair, Paithal, Datter Bazar, Niguari and Tangab.

== See also ==
- Upazilas of Bangladesh
- Districts of Bangladesh
- Divisions of Bangladesh
