= Bhaluka Upazila =

Bhaluka ভালুকা
- Upazila
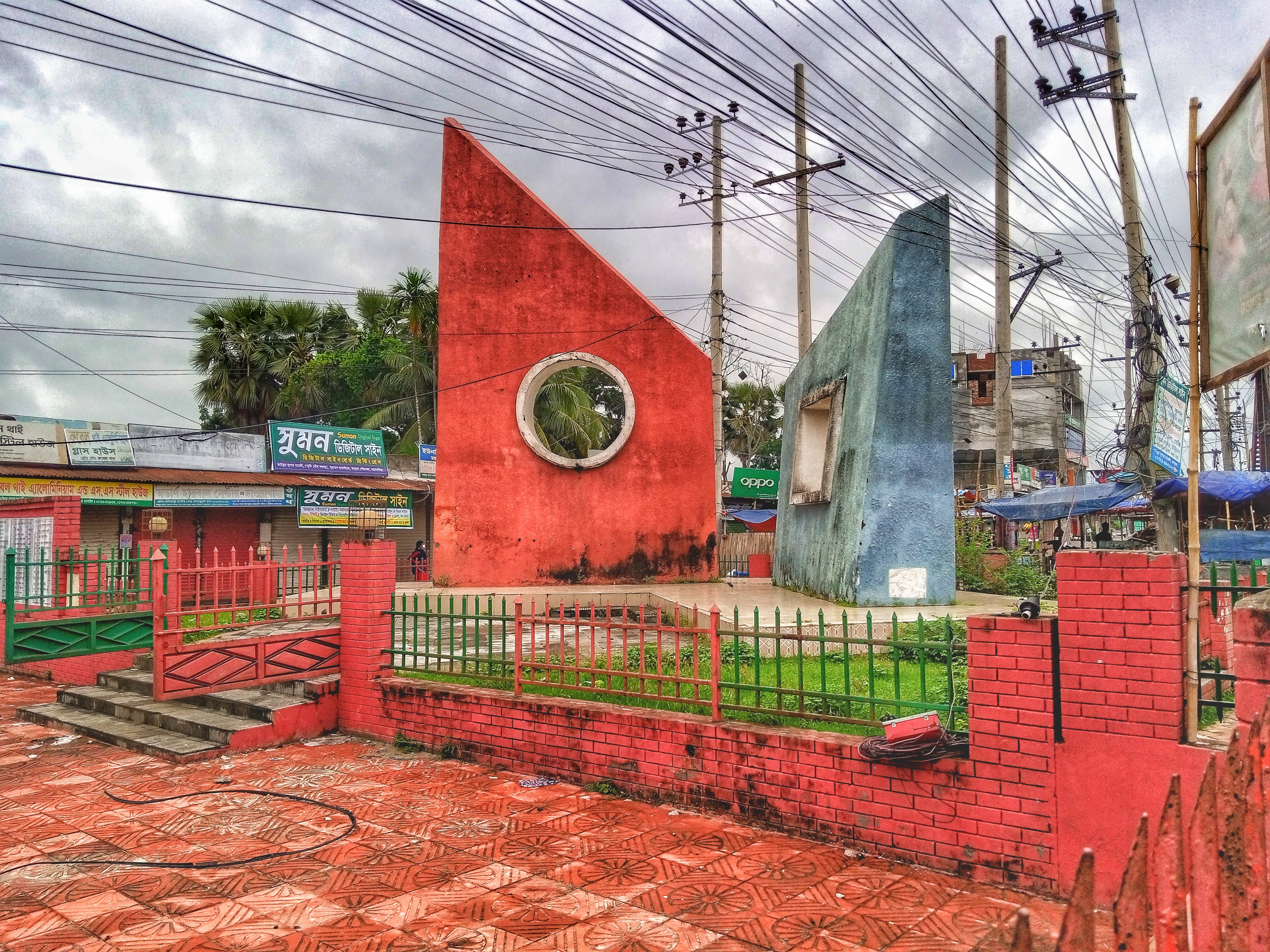
- Bhaluka Memorial Monument

- Coordinates: 24°22.5′N 90°22.7′E
- Country: Bangladesh
- Division: Mymensingh
- District: Mymensingh

Government
  - MP (Mymensingh-11): Fakhruddin Ahmed (BNP)
  - Upazila Chairman: Muhammad Abul Kalam

Area
  - Total: 444.05 km^{2} (171.45 sq mi)

Population (2022)
  - Total: 583,981
  - Density: 1,315.1/km^{2} (3,406.2/sq mi)
- Time zone: UTC+6 (BST)
- Postal code: 2240
- Area code: 09022
- Website: bhaluka.mymensingh.gov.bd

Bhaluka (Bengali: ভালুকা) is an upazila of Mymensingh District, Bangladesh. It is one of the oldest small-scale business hubs in the area.

== Etymology ==
Bhaluka Upazila is named after the Bhaluka village and Bhaluka Bazar located in the union. There are three main theories behind its etymology:

1. During the British rule, indigo planters established indigo factories in various locations to serve their interests. After setting up an indigo factory in the area (known as Neelkuthi), the planters frequently went hunting. In the forest, they encountered tigers and bears. The Bengali word for bear is ভালুক (Bhaluk), so Bhaluka is considered a corruption of Bhaluk.
2. The revenue office (kachari bari) of the eastern bazaar was under the name of Bhawal's zamindar. It was known as Bhawal-er Kachari. Some believe this was shortened to Bhaluka.
3. As the area is inhabited by the Koch people, another theory suggests that Bhaluka was named after the tribal Koch chief Bhaluk Chand Mandal.

== History ==
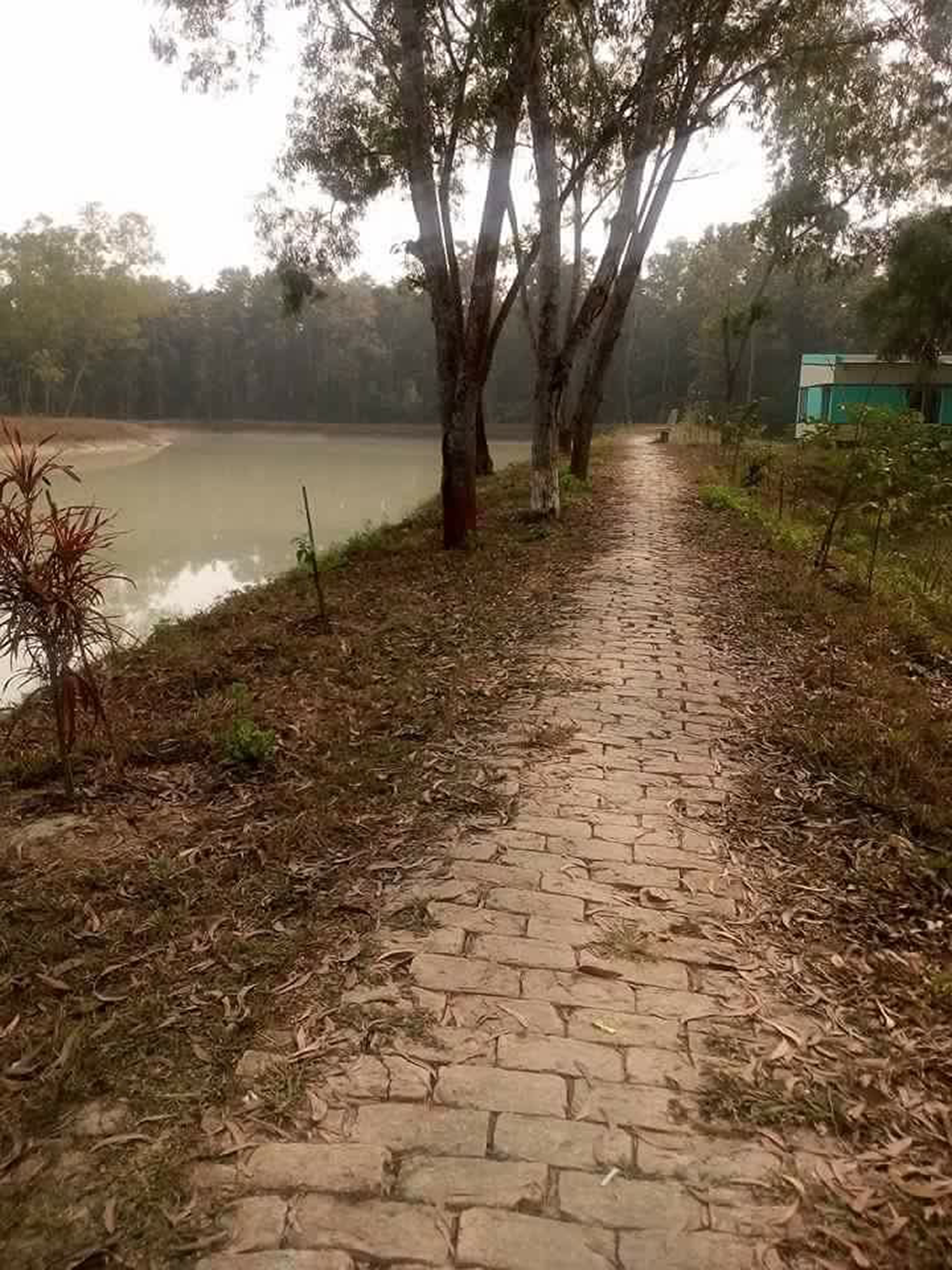
Brick road winding through Kadigarh National Park in Bhaluka.

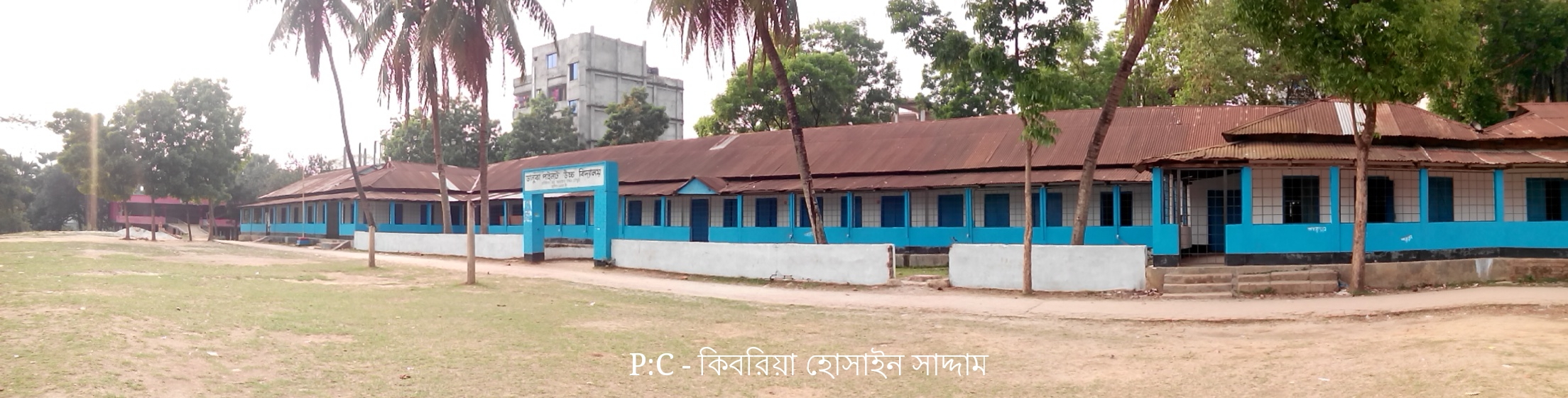
Bhaluka Pilot High School, established in 1948.

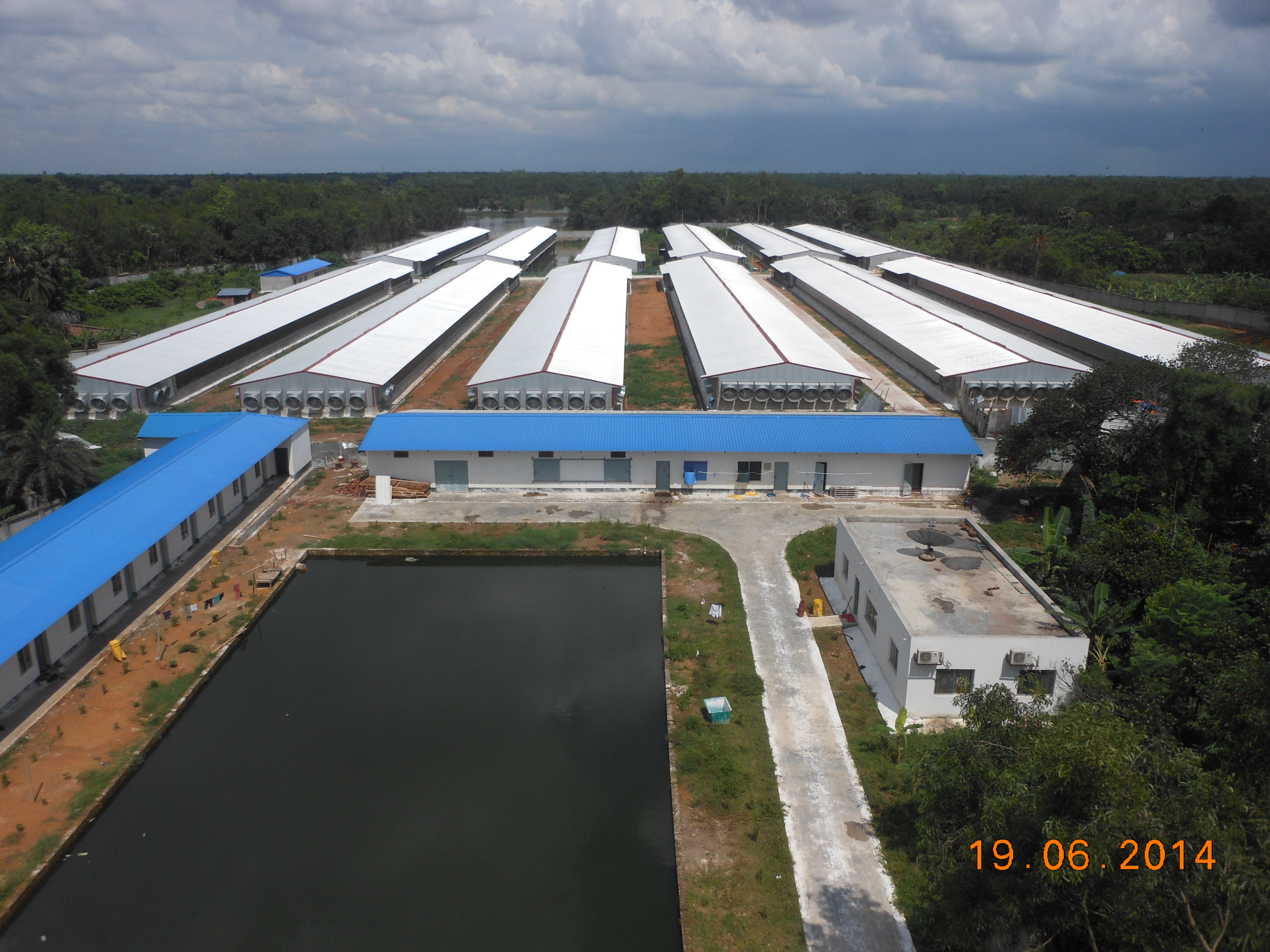
New Hope Farm located in Bhaluka.

During the reigns of the Palas and Senas, Bhaluka was administered by a samanta. It came under Muslim rule during the reign of Sultan Alauddin Husain Shah in the early fourteenth century.

Khan Saheb Abedullah Chowdhury was a notable zamindar of Bhaluka. He, along with his wife, Halimunnesa Chowdhurani, made significant contributions to the development of Bhaluka. Under the leadership of Abedullah Chowdhury and with the assistance of Mansur Ali Khan, Zayed Ali, and Zayed Khan, the Bhaluka Bazar (marketplace) was established. However, the Bhaluka Bazar area was divided into two parts, each controlled by different zamindars (landowners). The western bazaar was under Maharaja Shashikanta of the Muktagacha Zamindari, while the entirety of Bhaluka, along with the eastern bazaar, was under the Bhawal Zamindari. In the forests of the former part, there was a mazar whose custodian was Innat Faqir, the father of Wahid Ali Faqir. There was a courthouse in the eastern bazaar, where rent was collected for the Zamindar of Bhawal. The village next to the marketplace also came to be known as Bhaluka. Separating from Gafargaon Thana, Bhaluka became its own administrative thana of Mymensingh Subdivision in 1917. Maulvi AKM Nazir Hosain was appointed as the Sub-Registrar of Bhaluka.

Their son Aftabuddin Chowdhury served as a member of the National Assembly from 1965 to 1969 representing the Pakistan Muslim League and later as an MP in Bangladesh from the same party. The Dhaka-Mymensingh highway was constructed during the regime of Ayub Khan following a proposal by Chowdhury.

During the Bangladesh War of 1971, Afsar Uddin Ahmed, the Sub-sector Commander of Sector 11, gathered arms and ammunition and established the Afsar Bahini to challenge the Pakistan Army. Mohammad Abdul Mannan, a Civil Engineering student and the vice president of the student wing at Rajshahi Engineering College, was the first to collect three units of 303 rifles from the nearest thana and requested Afsar Uddin to train everyone. Shah Ali Akbar was also a fighter from Bhaluka. Together with Mohammad Abdul Mannan and Afsar Uddin Ahmed, he organized the Mukti Bahini in Bhaluka. The Pakistan Army established military camps at Mallikbari, Tashka, Tamat, and Bhaluka Bazar. A memorial monument was erected at Bhaluka Bus Stand. Bhaluka Thana was upgraded to an upazila in August 1983.

In 2010, work began on the Kadigarh National Park located in Palgaon, Kachina Union.

== Geography ==
Bhaluka covers a total area of 444.05 km^{2}. It is bordered by Fulbaria and Trishal Upazilas to the north, Sreepur Upazila to the south, Gafargaon to the east, South Gafargaon to the southeast, and Sakhipur and Ghatail Upazilas to the west. The major rivers flowing through the upazila are Sutia, Khiru, Lalti, and Bajua.

== Administration ==
Bhaluka Upazila mauza geocode map

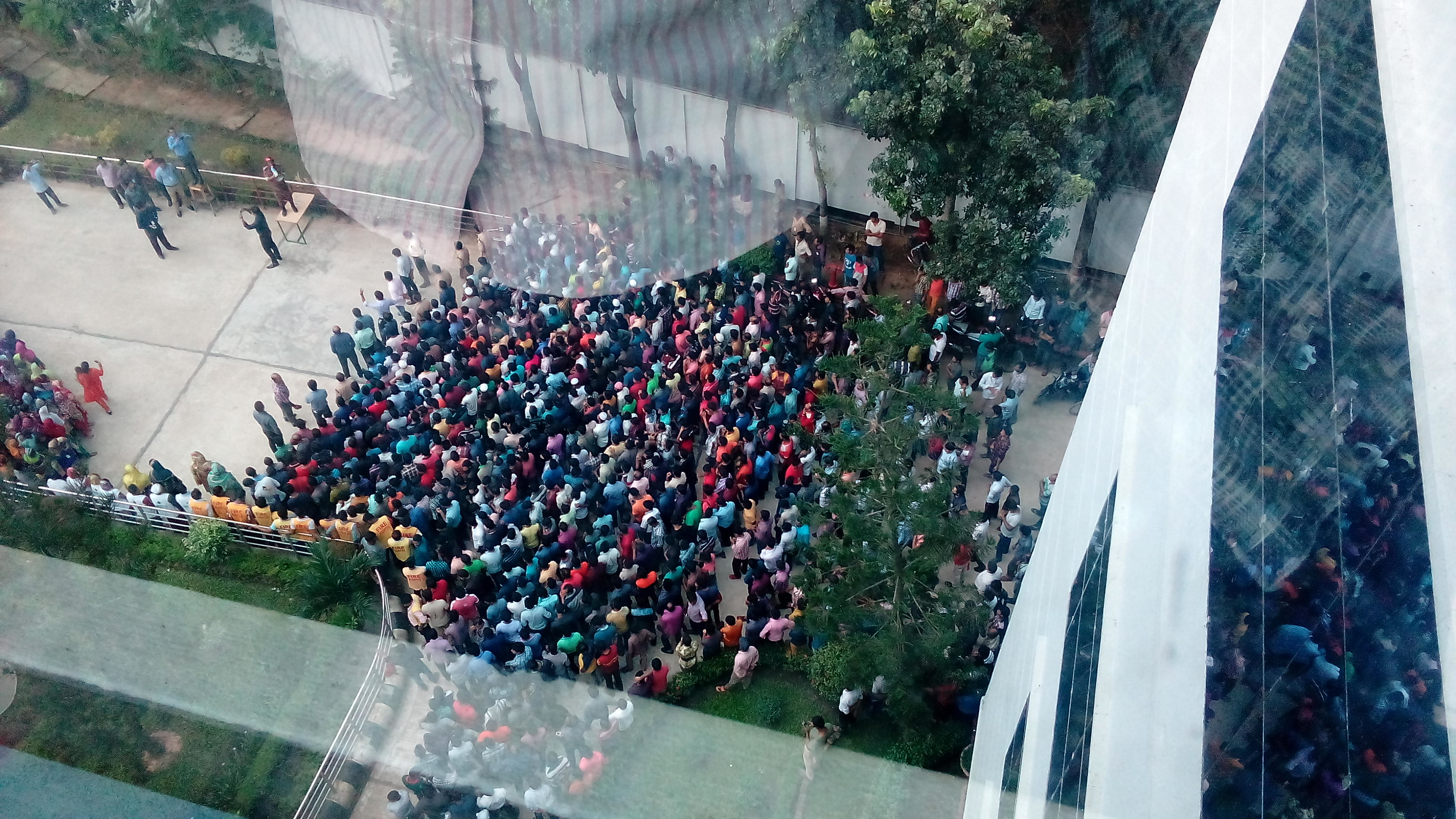
PA Knite Composite Factory.

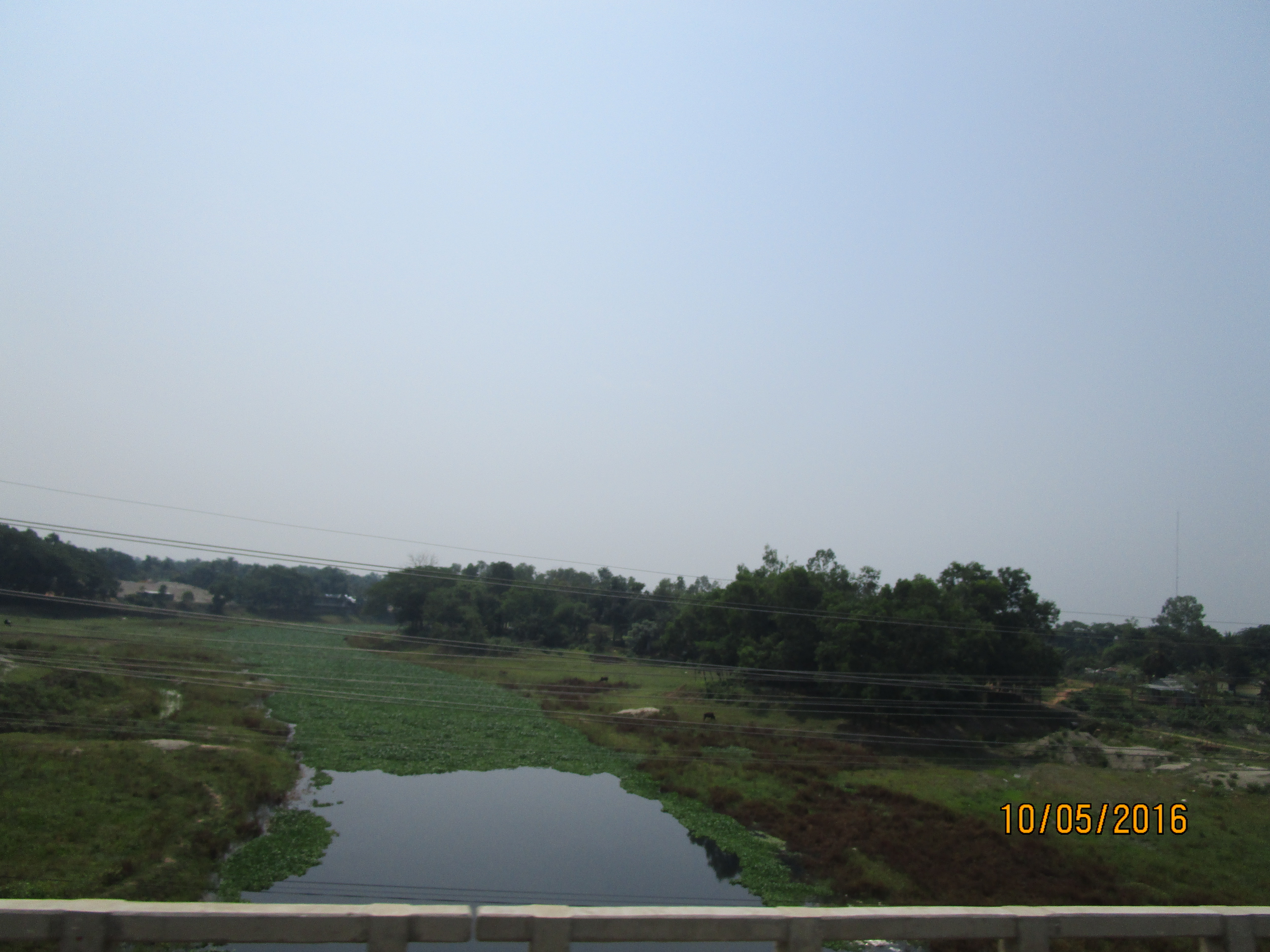
Medua River, Bhaluka

Bhaluka, established as a Thana in 1917, was upgraded to an upazila in 1983.

Bhaluka Upazila comprises Bhaluka Municipality and 11 union parishads: Bhaluka, Birunia, Dakatia, Dhitpur, Habirbari, Kachina, Mallikbari, Meduari, Rajoi, Uthura, and Varadoba. These union parishads are further divided into 87 mauzas and 110 villages.

Bhaluka Municipality is divided into 9 wards and 18 mahallas.

=== Upazila chairmen ===
List of chairmen
Name	Term
Talukdar Julhas Uddin	1985 - 1989
Afsar Uddin Ahmed	1989 - 1991
Kazim Uddin Ahmed	2009- 2014
Muhammad Ghulam Mustafa	2014 - 2019
Muhammad Abul Kalam	Present

== Education ==
Bhaluka Govt. Girl's High School is one of the oldest educational institutes of the upazila. Bhaluka Pilot High School, founded in 1948 by Aftab Uddin Chowdhury, is considered the oldest and most renowned school in Bhaluka. Additionally, the Chowdhury family established numerous schools and madrasahs, placing particular emphasis on girls' education and establishing the Halimunnesa Chowdhurani Memorial Girls School. Batazor M.U. Founder of Dakhil Madrasah - Alhaj Moslem Uddin Sarkar.

Bhaluka Govt. College was established on 13 June 1972 by Mr. Mostofa M A Matin(MP), with land donated by Dr. Md. Abdul Khaleque and M. Md.Amir Ali.

== Demographics ==
Historical population
Year	Pop.	±%
1981	215,789	—
1991	264,991	+22.8%
2001	308,758	+16.5%
2011	430,320	+39.4%
2022	583,981	+35.7%
Source: Bangladesh Bureau of Statistics

Religions in Bhaluka Upazila (2022)
Religion	Percent
Islam	95.45%
Hinduism	4.18%
Other or not stated	0.37%

According to the 2022 Bangladeshi census, Bhaluka Upazila had 167,496 households and a population of 583,981. 8.74% of the population were under 5 years of age. Bhaluka had a literacy rate (age 7 and over) of 74.98%: 77.51% for males and 72.34% for females, and a sex ratio of 104.11 males for 100 females. 126,723 (21.70%) lived in urban areas.

A minority of 2,376 individuals (0.41%) belong to indigenous tribes such as the Garo, Rajbongshi, and Koch Mandai tribes. The Koch community resides primarily in Uthura and Dakatiya Unions and commonly bear the surname Varman.

== Economy ==
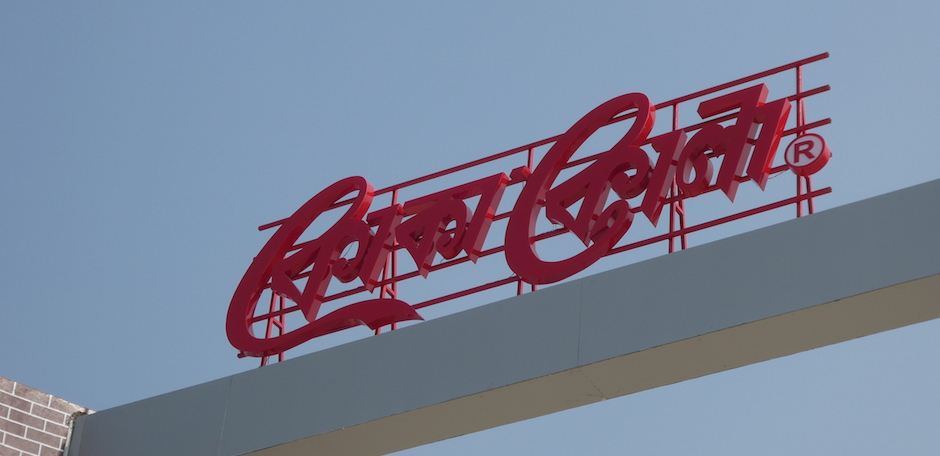
Coca-Cola factory in Bhaluka.

Bhaluka boasts several tourist attractions, including the historical mosques of Neshaiganj and Bhaluka Bazar, the picturesque Tepantar Shooting Spot, Pamwel Garden, Dream Holiday Resort, and Paradise Point. The Nilkuthi indigo factory, dating back to the British colonial period, adds to its historical charm. Additionally, the mosques at Uthura and Mallikbari are noteworthy landmarks, while the Kadigarh National Park attracts many visitors.

Notable establishments in the area include a crocodile breeding center in Hatiber, Mutalib Miah's Arabian date cultivation farm in Paragaon, the Mallikbari orange farm, and a rabbit breeding center in Habirbari. By 2014, there was a potential to export 4,000 crocodiles annually, with the one at Hatiber playing a crucial role in this endeavor. This export could generate an income ranging from three to 40 million dollars. Several European countries have already expressed official interest in importing crocodiles from Bangladesh.

== Notable people ==
- Aftabuddin Chowdhury, politician
- Arifin Shuvoo, film actor and TV personality
- Kazim Uddin Ahmed, politician
- Mohammed Amanullah, cardiologist
