= Mymensingh District =

Mymensingh District ময়মনসিংহ জেলা
- District of Bangladesh
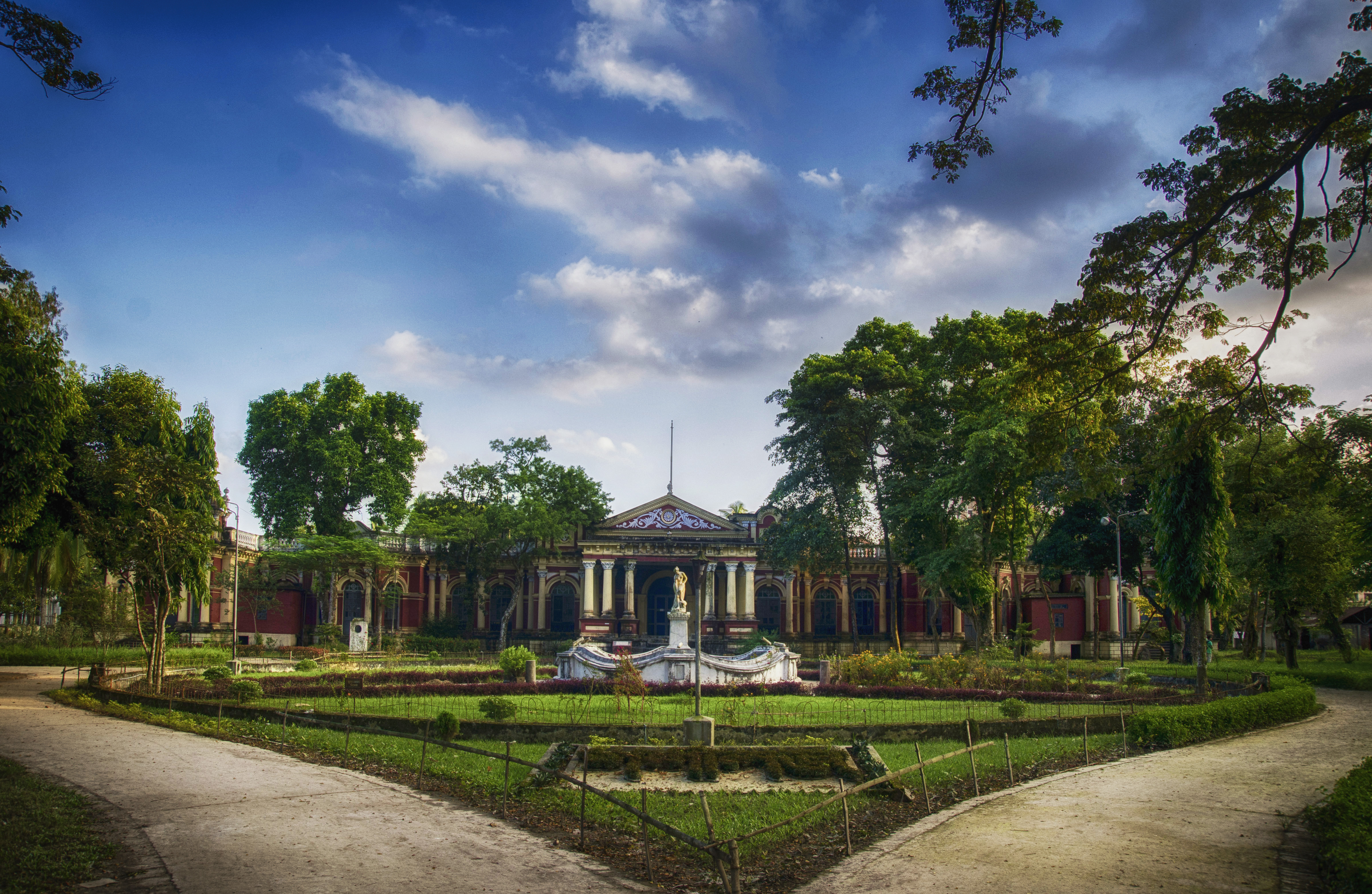
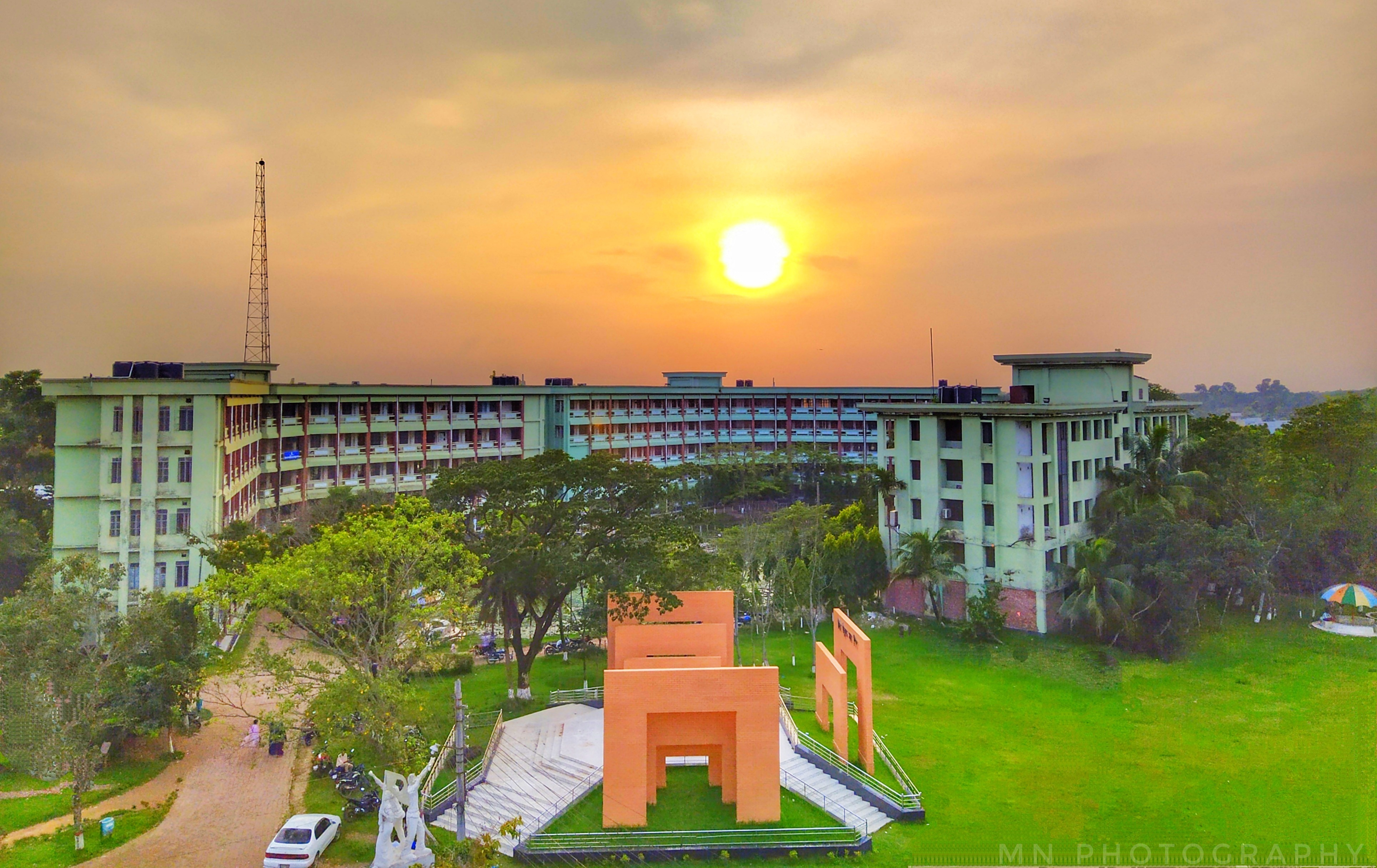
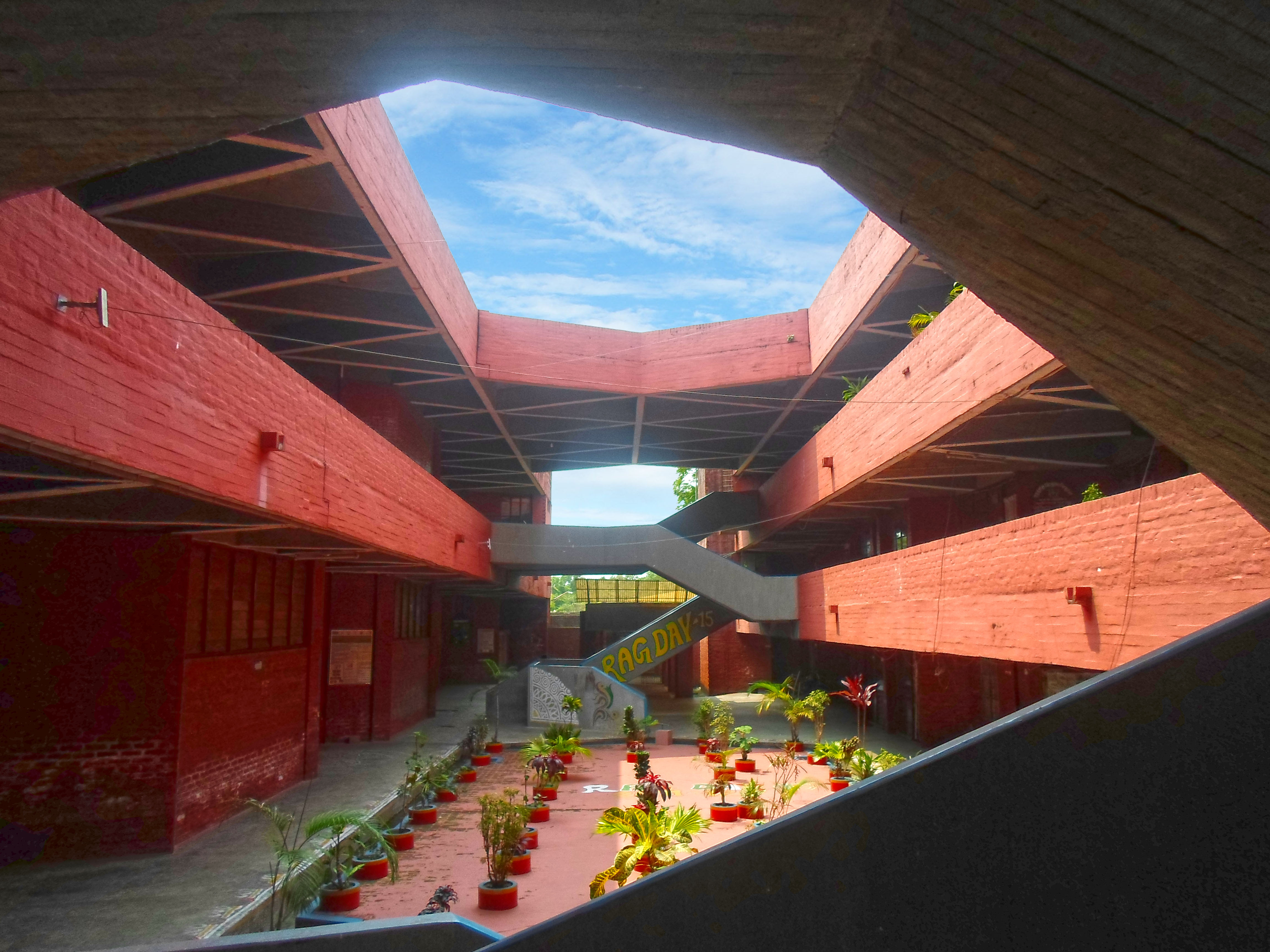
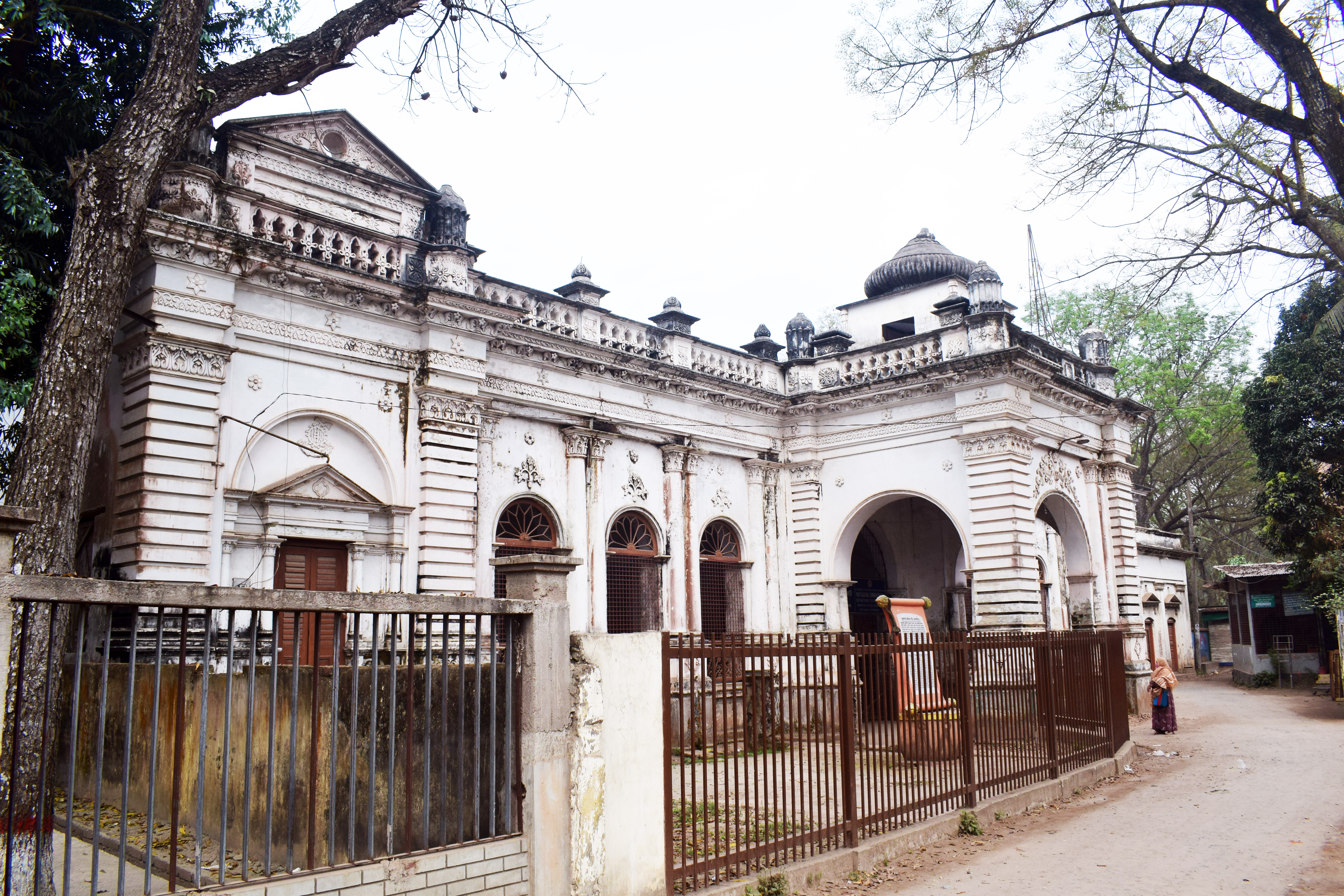
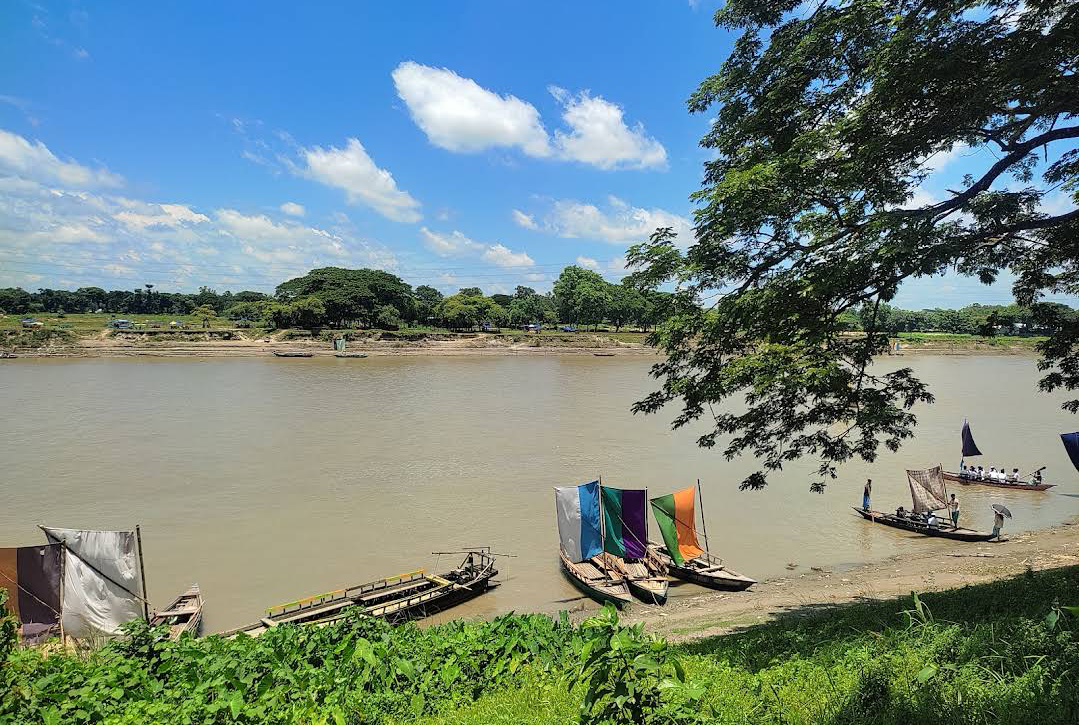
- Clockwise from top-left: Shashi Lodge, Jatiya Kabi Kazi Nazrul Islam University, BAU Building, Muktagacha Zamindar Bari, Old Jamuna River
- Nicknames: Momenshahi, Momishing, Moishing, Nasirabad, Education District, Green District
- Location of Mymensingh District in Bangladesh
- Expandable map of Mymensingh District
- Coordinates: 24°38′3″N 90°16′4″E
- Country: Bangladesh
- Division: Mymensingh Division
- Headquarters: Mymensingh

Area
  - Total: 4,363.48 km^{2} (1,684.75 sq mi)

Population (2022)
  - Total: 5,899,005
  - Density: 1,351.90/km^{2} (3,501.41/sq mi)
- Demonym: Mumishinga
- Time zone: UTC+06:00 (BST)
- Postal codes: 2200
- Area code: 091
- ISO 3166 code: BD-34
- HDI (2018): 0.562 medium · 19th of 21
- Website: mymensingh.gov.bd

Mymensingh District (Bengali: ময়মনসিংহ জেলা) is a district in Mymensingh Division Bangladesh, and is bordered in the north by Meghalaya, India and the Garo Hills, in the south by Gazipur District, in the east by the districts of Netrokona and Kishoreganj and in the west by the districts of Sherpur, Jamalpur and Tangail. Mymensingh is the 8th administrative divisional headquarters and 12th city corporation of Bangladesh. According to Ministry of Public Administration, Mymensingh is ranked 4th in district status. The density of Mymensingh city is 44,458/km^{2} (115,150/sq mi) which is the second most densely populated city in Bangladesh. Mymensingh attracts 25 percent of health tourists visiting Bangladesh. It was once known as the largest district of the Indian subcontinent. Mymensingh town is the district headquarters.

== Geography ==
The district covers an area of 4363.48 km^{2}. It is mostly plain land, in the north along the border there are several small valleys between high forests.

The temperature ranges from 12 to 33 °C, and the annual rainfall averages 2,174 mm.

Mymensingh district is situated in northern Bangladesh, at the heart of Mymensingh Division. It shares borders with the Garo Hills of India's Meghalaya state to the north, Gazipur District to the south, Netrokona and Kishoreganj districts to the east, and Sherpur, Jamalpur, and Tangail districts to the west.

The district's geology is defined by its location along an older course of the Brahmaputra, the main stream of which flowed through the district until the late 18th century. Consequently the majority of the district's geological formations are various alluvial deposits. The part of the district southwest of the Old Brahmaputra consists largely of the Madhupur tract which has comparatively elevated and harder soil. The northernmost part of the district, namely the part corresponding roughly to Haluaghat and Dhobaura upazilas, is mostly coarser sand with a tiny portion of the foothills of the Garo Hills, comprising Dihing and Dupi Tila formations, along the Indian border.

The delineation of Greater Mymensingh is: the north front line is just at the foot of Garo hills of Meghalaya of India, the south this area excludes Gazipur District, the east ends in the rich watery land of Bangladesh the natives call 'Haor', the west ends in the ancient single wood forest (e.g. Muktagacha, Fulbaria and Bhaluka upazilas) and the Chars of Jamalpur District border north-west of the Mymensingh district.

=== Forests ===
The Madhupur jungle is a slightly elevated tract, extending from the north of Dhaka district into the heart of Mymensingh; its average height is about 60 ft above the level of the surrounding country, and it nowhere exceeds 100 ft. The jungle contains abundance of sal, valuable both as timber and charcoal. Sal trees are particularly beneficial because they absorb more carbon than any other native tree, making them a crucial part of mitigating the severe pollution in Dhaka city. The only other elevated area in the district is along the northern border, where Susang Durgapur is located in Netrokona district, part of Greater Mymensingh. Haluaghat upazila in Mymensingh borders India and the Garo Hills of Meghalaya. The region is mostly covered by dense, thorny jungle, although some parts are barren and rocky.

=== Rivers ===
Mymensingh district has several rivers and numerous smaller khals and beels. The Old Brahmaputra river flows through the district in a southeasterly direction, entering the district at its tripoint with Jamalpur and Sherpur districts, passing through Mymensingh town, and finally turning southwards to form part of the border with Kishoreganj district. The city of Mymensingh stands on the bank of the Old Brahmaputra, as beginning in 1787 the main flow of the Brahmaputra shifted to the Jamuna River which flows west of the greater Mymensingh region. After about hundred years, a port city of sea vessels from England lost its status as the river became a seasonal flow. Some former residences of colonial officials along the riverside in the city are now government buildings.

The Kangsha River, which arises in the Garo Hills and enters the plain in Sherpur district, flows eastward through the northern part of the district. It forms the border between Phulpur Upazila and Haluaghat and Dhobaura upazilas, as well as part of the border with Netrokona district. The Nitai river, a tributary of the Kangsha, also arises in the Garo Hills and flows southward through Dhobaura Upazila, with its lowermost course forming part of the border with Netrokona District before its confluence with the Kangsha. The Narsunda River, a distributary of the Old Brahmaputra, flows first northeast, then bends near Ishwarganj to go southeasterly, before turning east again while flowing through Nandail Upazila and entering Kishoreganj District.

=== Climate ===
Climate data for Mymensingh
Month	Jan	Feb	Mar	Apr	May	Jun	Jul	Aug	Sep	Oct	Nov	Dec	Year
Mean daily maximum °C (°F)	24.0 (75.2)	27.7 (81.9)	31.8 (89.2)	33.4 (92.1)	32.1 (89.8)	31.0 (87.8)	31.2 (88.2)	31.2 (88.2)	31.1 (88.0)	30.8 (87.4)	28.7 (83.7)	25.8 (78.4)	29.9 (85.8)
Daily mean °C (°F)	17.5 (63.5)	20.7 (69.3)	25.1 (77.2)	27.8 (82.0)	27.9 (82.2)	28.0 (82.4)	28.5 (83.3)	28.5 (83.3)	28.4 (83.1)	27.2 (81.0)	23.4 (74.1)	19.6 (67.3)	25.2 (77.4)
Mean daily minimum °C (°F)	11.0 (51.8)	13.8 (56.8)	18.4 (65.1)	22.3 (72.1)	23.7 (74.7)	25.0 (77.0)	25.8 (78.4)	25.8 (78.4)	25.5 (77.9)	23.6 (74.5)	18.2 (64.8)	13.5 (56.3)	20.6 (69.0)
Average precipitation mm (inches)	12 (0.5)	17 (0.7)	46 (1.8)	110 (4.3)	286 (11.3)	469 (18.5)	401 (15.8)	398 (15.7)	311 (12.2)	179 (7.0)	18 (0.7)	2 (0.1)	2,249 (88.6)
Average relative humidity (%)	42	36	32	46	61	75	74	75	72	68	55	46	57
Source: National newspapers

== History ==
The early history of Mymensingh is little known. Due to its general isolation from the more populous centres of Bengal, this territory was always loosely-controlled by the state and was a frontier area dividing the more populous regions of Bengal from the Garo Hills. The region was part of the kingdom of Kamarupa, but after the breakup of Kamarupa, the region was conquered by the Bengal Sultanate. Between the 14th and 18th centuries, the lands of Mymensingh were generally ruled by political adventurers who came to Mymensingh after a defeat. The territory was nominally under Mughal control, but the Mughal state had very little influence in the region, separated as it was from the rest of Bengal by the mighty Brahmaputra, which at the time still flowed in its old channel through present-day Mymensingh.

During the late 15th and early 16th centuries, many families which would later become prominent zamindars arrived in the region and were granted ownership of lands by the Bengal Sultans. In the early 16th century, most of the district was under the control of the Baro-Bhuiyans, specifically Isa Khan. After his submission to the Mughal Empire, Isa Khan's son Musa Khan was granted ownership of much of northern and eastern Bangladesh, including Mymensingh. Mymensingh was part of the Sarkar of Bazuha in Bengal Subah and was also known as Tappe Hazradi. The northern part of the district at the foot of the Garo Hills was part of the Susang pargana, ruled by the Maharajas of Susang.

The district was acquired by the East India Company with the Dewani Grant from the Mughal Emperor in 1765. At that time its greater part was included in the Niabat (Sub-Province of Dhaka) and a small portion in the Zamindaries of Atia, Kagmari, Pukuria and Patilandaha (of Rahahahi Zamindari). At the time of Permanent Settlement, it included northwest Garo Hills and the present Brahmanbaria district but did not include north Tangail and north-west part of Jamalpur.

After the 1770 Famine, the Fakir-Sannyasi rebellion took place, where armed Fakirs and Sanyasis fought against the colonial power and the Zamindars, who at the time were still largely independent. Some of these armed godmen found employment as retainers of the Zamindars, (the Talukdars and Majumdars), and often fought for them, while also sometimes fighting their own employers. Because of the constant fighting and instability, often the Zamindars relied on the British administration to help maintain their power, which resulted in the British gaining more and more influence over the Zamindars.

Furthermore, starting in the 1780s, the Brahmaputra began to shift back to its old channel in the Jamuna, which led to a decrease in agricultural output in the region. However the Zamindars still needed to maintain their revenue and began exploiting the peasants even more. This led to the Pagalpanthi peasant movement among the many Muslims, Hindus and tribal peoples of the areas. The Pagalpanthis were a syncretic group who combined Hinduism, Islam and local folk religion and also resisted the oppression of the Zamindars. The Pagalpanthis soon began to rebel against the Zamindars and Britishers, but were eventually crushed.

In 1799, Taluk Amirabad was transferred to Tippera (Comilla). In 1809, Patiladaha, situated north-east of the Brahmaputra came to district form Rangpur. In 1811, the river Banar and Brahmaputra were declared boundary between Dhaka and Mymensingh district and the river Brahmaputra and Meghna as boundary between Tippera (Comilla) and Mymensingh and Dhaka. In 1811 west Garo Hills were transferred to Rangpur district. In 1812 Patiladaha was retransferred to Rangpur. In 1830, Parganas Sarail, Daudpur, Haripur, Bejra, and Satarakhandal, were transferred to Tippera for Public convenience. In 1855, due to change in river course part of Serajganj thana was transferred from Mymensingh to Pabna and in 1866, the whole of it was transferred to Pabna. In 1866, thana Dewanganj was transferred to Mymensingh from Bogra and thana Atia from Dhaka. In 1867 for the administrative convenience boundaries of five subdivisions (including Tangail) and Thanas were notified. In 1874, on the basis of survey, the district boundaries were notified. In 1874, the Jamuna (or Daokoba) River was declared the western boundary between Mymensingh and Bogra and as such, 165 villages were transferred to Bogra. In 1875, the Jamuna was made the boundary between Mymensingh and Rangpur and the portion of Patiladaha, east of the river, was transferred to this district form Rangpur. In 1877, the Jamuna was declared as the boundary between Pabna and Mymensingh in the west.

On 1 December 1969, the Tangail subdivision was separated from Mymensingh District to become Tangail District. Then in 1977, another new district Jamalpur (including present Sherpur district) was formed. In 1984, Kishoreganj and Netrokona districts were caved out of from Mymensingh district.

=== Timeline ===
- 1772—1790 Fakir and Sannyasi revolt
- 1787 floods
- 1788 famines
- 1897 Earthquake
- 1905 Swadeshi Movement
- 1947 Breakdown of British India
- 1971 Independence war
- 2015 8th division of Bangladesh

== Administrative divisions ==
Mymensingh District upazila geocode map

Inside map of Mymensingh District with Bengali text

Mymensingh district was established in 1787, which was later on reorganised into six districts, namely, Tangail, Jamalpur, Kishoreganj, Sherpur, Netrokona, and Mymensingh. Currently, Mymensingh district has a city corporation, eight municipalities and thirteen upazilas. One of the most eminent District Magistrate and Collector of Mymensingh district was Gurusaday Dutt, Esq., ICS, the first Indian to come first in any part of the Open Competitive Services Examination then held in England.

No.	Upazila (subdistrict) name	Area (sq km)	Population (2022)
1	Bhaluka	444.05	583,953
2	Trishal	338.98	491,467
3	Haluaghat	356.07	316,528
4	Muktagacha	314.71	460,381
5	Dhobaura	251.05	217,466
6	Fulbaria	402.41	495,894
7	Gafargaon	166.66	2,75,000
8	South Gafargaon	235	3,00,000
8	Gauripur	374.07	357,331
9	Ishwarganj	286.19	404,598
10	Mymensingh Sadar	388.45	998,340
11	Nandail	326.13	421,277
12	Phulpur	312.53	350,967
13	Tarakanda	313.68	337,297
14	Fulbaria	398.70	495,917

=== Major zamindaris of Mymensingh (before 1947) ===
- Susanga (Maharaja) (3rd in the Order of Precedence in the Government House of Calcutta before 1947)
- Muktagagacha (also called Mymensingh) (Maharaja)
- Ramgopalpur (Raja)
- Gouripur (Babu)
- Kalipur (Babu)
- Malotipur

== City ==
Mymensingh City, earlier known as Nasirabad or Momenshahi, is on the west bank of Old Brahmaputra River. The population is around 225,811. Having Bangladesh Agricultural University, Jatiya Kabi Kazi Nazrul Islam University, Mymensingh Engineering College, Women Teachers Training College, Teachers Training College-Both, Government Laboratory High School, Mymensingh, Mymensingh Zilla School, Govt. Mumenunnesa College, Ananda Mohan College, huge bridge on Brahmaputra river, two medical colleges (Mymensingh Medical College, Community Based Medical College), eight high schools, Raj bari, and surrounding farm lands, Mymensingh is one of the best places for living and educating children in Bangladesh. Because there are very few fuel run-vehicles, sound pollution and air pollution levels are very low. There is no public boys college in Mymensingh city; however, every year many students from the town are admitted to various universities and medical colleges in Bangladesh. Now, Mymensingh is the 12th city corporation of Bangladesh named Mymensingh City Corporation. Mymensingh Girls' Cadet College is the nation's first military high school for girls. Much land occupied by various churches in Mymensingh city in relation to number of followers.

Religious institutions include 2,362 mosques, 1,020 temples, 600 Buddhist temples, and 36 churches.

Zainul Udyan beside the river Brahmaputra, Circuit House Park, Botanical Garden, BAU, Shashi Lodge are the places visited in the city.

== Demographics ==
Historical population
Year	Pop.	±% p.a.
1974	2,719,276	—
1981	3,231,179	+2.49%
1991	3,957,182	+2.05%
2001	4,489,726	+1.27%
2011	5,110,272	+1.30%
2022	5,899,005	+1.31%

Religions in Mymensingh District (2022)
Religion	Percent
Islam	96.04%
Hinduism	3.43%
Christianity	0.50%
Other or not stated	0.03%

According to the 2022 Census of Bangladesh, Mymensingh District had 1,460,904 households and a population of 5,899,905 with an average 3.97 people per household. Among the population, 1,202,837 (20.39%) inhabitants were under 10 years of age. The population density was 1,342 people per km^{2}. Mymensingh District had a literacy rate (age 7 and over) of 70.89%, compared to the national average of 74.7%, and a sex ratio of 1,034 females per 1,000 males. Approximately, 22.90% (1,351,016) of the population lived in urban areas. The ethnic population was 27,652 (0.47%), mainly Garo and Hajong.

Religion in present-day Mymensingh District
Religion	1941 (Note: Sadar subdivision of Mymensingh district)		1981		1991		2001		2011		2022	
Religion	Pop.	%	Pop.	%	Pop.	%	Pop.	%	Pop.	%	Pop.	%
Islam	1,261,714	78.37%	3,039,658	94.07%	3,748,759	94.73%	4,289,789	95.55%	4,895,267	95.79%	5,665,649	96.04%
Hinduism	321,264	19.95%	159,285	4.93%	168,091	4.25%	168,135	3.74%	183,026	3.58%	202,440	3.43%
Tribal religion	26,091	1.62%	—N/a	—N/a	—N/a	—N/a	—N/a	—N/a	—N/a	—N/a	—N/a	—N/a
Christianity	507	0.03%	26,226	0.82%	29,812	0.75%	27,999	0.62%	28,446	0.56%	29,737	0.50%
Others (Note: Including Jainism, Buddhism, Zoroastrianism, Judaism, Ad-Dharmis, or not stated)	398	0.03%	6,010	0.18%	10,520	0.27%	3,803	0.09%	3,533	0.07%	1,179	0.03%
Total Population	1,609,974	100%	3,231,179	100%	3,957,182	100%	4,489,726	100%	5,110,272	100%	5,899,005	100%

== Railroads ==
The Eastern Bengal Railway opened a line from Dhaka to Mymensingh in 1884. The line was extended to Jamalpur in 1898. What is now the Narayanganj–Bahadurabad Ghat line has 14 stations in the district, the main one being Mymensingh Junction railway station. The Mymensingh–Gouripur–Bhairab line serves a further 10 stations in the district.
