= Mohammed Zakir Hossain =

Bangladeshi politician

Mohammad Zakir Hossain Bablu
- মোহাম্মদ জাকির হোসেন

Member of the Bangladesh Parliament for Mymensingh-5
- Incumbent
- Assumed office 17 February 2026
- Preceded by: Nazrul Islam

Personal details
- Party: Bangladesh Nationalist Party
- Relations: A. K. M. Mosharraf Hossain (brother)
- Occupation: Politician

Mohammad Zakir Hossain Bablu (Bengali: মোহাম্মদ জাকির হোসেন বাবলু) is a Bangladeshi politician who is the member of parliament for the Mymensingh-5 constituency. He was elected in the 13th parliamentary election, held on 13 February 2026, as a candidate of the Bangladesh Nationalist Party (BNP).

He is the younger brother of A. K. M. Mosharraf Hossain, who represented Mymensingh-5 in parliament from 1996 to 2006. Zakir stood unsuccessfully for the seat twice, in 2008 and 2018.

== Biography ==
Mohammed Zakir Hossain is the younger brother of A. K. M. Mosharraf Hossain.

A. K. M. Mosharraf Hossain was a Bangladesh Nationalist Party (BNP) politician who was the member of parliament for Mymensingh-5 from 1996 to 2006.

The 2008 general election gave Zakir a chance to stand for parliament. The BNP selected him as their candidate for Mymensingh-5 and his brother for Mymensingh-4. Zakir finished second behind Awami League candidate K. M. Khalid, receiving 81,205 votes, 32.2% of those cast.

For the 2018 general election, the BNP again selected Zakir to stand against K. M. Khalid in Mymensingh-5. He was again defeated, and by a much wider margin.

By February 2025, Hossain held the position of convener of the Mymensingh District BNP (south).

When the interim government of Muhammad Yunus called a general election for 2026, Hossain was nominated as the BNP's candidate for Mymensingh-5. According to unofficial results reported by Bangladesh Sangbad Sangstha, Hossain was elected with a majority of 26,668.

On 8 July 2026, parliament appointed Hossain to its 15-member Standing Committee on Public Accounts. The Public Accounts Committee is one of the most important parliamentary committees. It audits spending by the executive branch, ensuring money has been spent legally and for the purposes authorized by parliament.
