= Ishwarganj (disambiguation) =

Ishwarganj is a town and municipality in Mymensingh District, Bangladesh.

Ishwarganj may also refer to the following places in Bangladesh:

- Ishwarganj Union, a Union Parishad under Ishwarganj Upazila
- Ishwarganj Upazila, an upazila of the Mymensingh District
