= Umanathpur =

Umanathpur is a small village in the Rajibpur Union of Ishwarganj Upazila, Mymensingh District, Bangladesh. It is known as the smallest village in the country. Additionally, the village is also a mouza (JL 116) encompassing only this single village.

== Geographic location ==
Umanathpur is approximately 15 kilometers from the Ishwarganj Upazila headquarters. The village is bordered by Ramgobindapur to the north, Haripur to the south, Udayrampur to the east, and the Brahmaputra River to the west. The total land area is approximately six to seven acres.

== History ==
Umanathpur was named in 1916 after Umanath Chowdhury, a talukdar during the British period, who established it. His only son, Yamininath Chowdhury, worked as a naib (land officer). Yamininath had three sons—Nalinanath Chowdhury, Abaninanath Chowdhury, and Barendranath Chowdhury—and a daughter, Shatadalbasini Devi. Following the Partition of India in 1947, all the family members migrated to India.

Later, in 1965, Ramzan Ali Sarkar built a house in this area, which his family subsequently used. Currently, only two descendants of his family reside here, forming the sole household in the village.

== Population ==
Currently, the permanent population of Umanathpur village is only two people. Although the village once had a population of four, it has decreased over time. At present, a single family resides in the village.
