= Jatia Union =

Coordinates: 24.6374°N 90.6341°E

Jatia Union is a union parishad under Ishwarganj Upazila of Mymensingh District in the division of Mymensingh, Bangladesh.

== Geography ==
Jatia Union is bounded on the east by Atharabari and Sarisha Unions, on the west by Maijbagh Union, on the south by Maijbagh Union and Nandail Upazila and on the north by Sohagi and Ishwarganj Union.
