= Md. Omar Faruk =

Bangladeshi politician

Member of the Bangladesh Parliament for Naogaon-6
- In office 7 January 2024 – 6 August 2024
- Preceded by: Anwar Hossain Helal
- Succeeded by: Seikh Md. Rejaul Islam

Personal details
- Party: Independent

Md. Omar Faruk is a Bangladeshi politician and a former Jatiya Sangsad member representing the Naogaon-6 constituency.

== Career ==
Faruk was elected to parliament from Naogaon-6 as an Independent candidate on 7 January 2024.
