= Tarundia Union =

Tarundia তারুন্দিয়া
- Union
- Location in Bangladesh
- Coordinates: 24°40′14.66″N 90°32′07.48″E
- Country: Bangladesh
- Division: Mymensingh Division
- District: Mymensingh District

Area
  - Total: 27.32 km^{2} (10.55 sq mi)

Population (2011)
  - Total: 32,289
  - Density: 1,182/km^{2} (3,061/sq mi)
- Time zone: UTC+06:00 (BST)
- Postal code: 2280
- Literacy: 41.08%
- Official language: Bengali and English

Tarundia is a union of Ishwarganj Upazila, Mymensingh District, Mymensingh Division in Bangladesh. Border area cover in the western side is Vangnamari Union, in the northern side Douhakhola Union, in the eastern side is Barahit Union and in the southern side is Uchakhila Union. Villages of this union are Tarundia, Mirzapur, Matikhola, Dhopakhola, Balihata, Gowalpara, Golla, Taherpur, Konapara, Shakua, Shartaj Bahera, Nagaryatrapur, Kazir Bahera, Jhithor, Gaborboalia, Purabaria, Indrajitkhola, Begunbari and so on.

== Geographical location ==
This Union is situated on the bank of Swine river and Koila/Kalia Bill.

== Education ==
There are many educational institutions in this union.

- Tarundia Jagat Memorial High School
- Konapara High School
- Shakua Adarsh Bidya Niketon
- Purabaria High School
- Golla Alia Madrasha (Boys)
- Golla Alia Madrasha (Girls)
- Tarundia Government Primary School
- Taherpur Government Primary School
- Dhopakhola Government Primary School
- Shakua Government Primary School
- Polash Kanda Government Primary School
