= Ohidur Rahman =

Bangladeshi politician (1943–2025)

- ওহিদুর রহমান

Member of 3rd Jatiya Sangsad
- In office 1986–1988
- Preceded by: Chowdhury Motahar Hossain (Rajshahi-9)
- Succeeded by: Mullah Rezaul Islam
- Constituency: Naogaon-6

Personal details
- Born: 1943 Atrai, Naogaon District, Rajshahi Division, Bengal Province, British India
- Died: 26 July 2025 (aged 81) Dhaka, Bangladesh
- Party: Communist Party of Bangladesh; Awami League

Ohidur Rahman (Bengali: ওহিদুর রহমান; 1943 – 26 July 2025) was a Bangladeshi Communist political leader, independence activist and writer. He was a member of parliament for Naogaon-6.

== Background ==
Ohidur Rahman was born in 1943, into a Bengali Muslim family in Atrai, Naogaon, Rajshahi District, Bengal Province, British India. He completed his education at the University of Rajshahi where he studied political science, and was associated with the Writers Students League.

Rahman died in Dhaka on 26 July 2025, at the age of 81.

== Career ==
Prior to Bangladesh's independence, Ohidur Rahman had been a part of Abdul Hamid Khan Bhashani's National Awami Party and Purbo Banglar Communist Party. During the Bangladesh Liberation War of 1971, he set up resistances in 9 areas across Rajshahi. After the Independence of Bangladesh, he became the leader of the Communist Party of Bangladesh's Atrai branch and later the greater Rajshahi branch. Not long after, he was arrested after being injured in an armed brawl as part of a Naxalite uprising. He was released from prison in 1977.

During the 1986 Bangladeshi general elections, Ohidur Rahman successfully won a seat in the newly created Naogaon-6 constituency as an independent candidate. He stood up again as a Communist Party candidate during the 1991 Bangladeshi general elections but lost to Bangladesh Nationalist Party politician Alamgir Kabir. He stood up as an Awami League candidate in the 1996 Bangladeshi general elections, but lost again to BNP politician Kabir.

Rahman wrote several works relating to the Bangladesh Liberation War and politics of Bangladesh. Two of his notable books are Mukti Shongrame Atrai (Atrai in the Liberation struggle) and Gontobbohīn Pothe (In a path with no destination).
