= Mahmud Hasan Sumon =

Bangladeshi politician

Member of the Bangladesh Parliament for Mymensingh-8
- In office 30 January 2024 – 6 August 2024
- Preceded by: Fakhrul Imam
- Succeeded by: Luthfullahel Mazed

Personal details
- Born: 20 December 1978 (age 47)

Mahmud Hasan Sumon (born 20 December 1978) is a Bangladeshi politician and a former Jatiya Sangsad member representing the Mymensingh-8 constituency.
