= Abu Reza Fazlul Haque Bablu =

Bangladesh Nationalist Party Politician And Lawyer

- আবু রেজা ফজলুল হক বাবলু

Member of the Bangladesh Parliament for Mymensingh-5
- In office 15 February 1996 – 12 June 1996
- Preceded by: Keramat Ali Talukdar
- Succeeded by: A. K. M. Mosharraf Hossain

Personal details
- Born: 4 September 1955 (age 70) Mymensingh District
- Party: Bangladesh Nationalist Party

Abu Reza Fazlul Haque Bablu Bangladesh Nationalist Party politician. He was elected a member of parliament from Mymensingh-5 in February 1996.

== Career ==
Bablu is a lawyer and president of Muktagachha Upazila BNP. He was elected to parliament from Mymensingh-5 as a Bangladesh Nationalist Party candidate in 15 February 1996 Bangladeshi general election.
