= Hashimuddin Ahmed =

Bangladeshi politician

Hashim Uddin Ahmed

Member of Bangladesh Parliament
- In office 1986–1988
- Preceded by: Shamsul Huda Chaudhury
- Succeeded by: Fakhrul Imam

Personal details
- Party: Jatiya Party (Ershad)

Hashim Uddin Ahmed is a Jatiya Party (Ershad) politician and a former member of parliament for Mymensingh-8.

== Career ==
In the early 1950s, Ahmed worked to remove Sheikh Mujibur Rahman from the post of general secretary of the Awami League. He was aided by Abdus Salam Khan, Khairat Hossain, and Almas Ali. Ahmed was a member of the East Pakistan Assembly in 1957. He was elected to parliament from Mymensingh-8 as a Jatiya Party candidate in 1986.
