= Ishwarganj Degree College =

Coordinates: 24.7629°N 90.3976°E

Ishwarganj Government College
- ঈশ্বরগঞ্জ সরকারি কলেজ
- Type: Public
- Established: 1968
- Principal: Md. Rafikul Islam Khan
- Students: 4,250
- Location: Ishwarganj Mymensingh, Bangladesh
- Campus: Urban
- Website: ishwarganjgovtcollege.edu.bd

Ishwarganj Government College is a public university-college located in Ishwarganj, Mymensingh near the Kacamatia river in Bangladesh.

== History ==
Ishwarganj College was established in 1968, in Ishwarganj, Mymensingh and it's the first college in Ishwarganj Upazila.

The institution became Ishwarganj Degree College when pass-level degree courses were introduced in 1975. Honors-level courses in two subjects were added in 2011. The college was nationalised in September 2018.
