= Sarisha Union, Ishwarganj =

Coordinates: 24.6683°N 90.6679°E

Sarisha Union is a union parishad under Ishwarganj Upazila of Mymensingh District in the division of Mymensingh, Bangladesh.
