= Md. Abu Wahab Akanda Wahid =

Bangladeshi politician

- মোঃ আবু ওয়াহাব আকন্দ ওয়াহিদ

Member of the Bangladesh Parliament for Mymensingh-4
- Incumbent
- Assumed office 17 February 2026
- Preceded by: Mohit Ur Rahman Shanto

Personal details
- Party: Bangladesh Nationalist Party
- Occupation: Politician

Md. Abu Wahab Akanda Wahid (Bengali: মোঃ আবু ওয়াহাব আকন্দ ওয়াহিদ) is a Bangladeshi politician who is the member of parliament for the Mymensingh-4 constituency. He was elected in the 13th parliamentary election, held on 13 February 2026, as a candidate of the Bangladesh Nationalist Party (BNP).

He was the BNP's candidate for the same seat in the 2018 general election.

== Biography ==
Wahid's father was a farmer. Wahid is a former student leader.

He was the joint convener of the Mymensingh metropolitan unit of the Bangladesh Nationalist Party (BNP).

The BNP selected Wahid as their candidate for the Mymensingh-4 constituency in the 2018 general election. The campaign in this constituency was noteworthy because his opponent was incumbent Raushan Ershad, co-chair of the Jatiya Party and leader of the opposition in parliament. He finished second behind Ershad, receiving 103,950 votes, 28.4% of those cast.

In June 2024, Wahid was made assistant organizing secretary for the Mymensingh Division unit of the BNP.

There were two main contenders for the party's nomination in the 2026 general election, Wahid and Rokonuzzaman Sarkar Rokon, member secretary of the district BNP. On 4 December 2025, the BNP chose Wahid. Campaign disclosures described him as having tens of millions of taka in assets and ten legal cases pending against him. According to unofficial results reported by Bangladesh Sangbad Sangstha, Wahid was elected with a majority of 7,788.
