= Mansura Mohiuddin =

Bangladeshi politician (died 2021)

Begum Monsura "Mukti" Mohiuddin

Member of Parliament for Nilphamari-1
- In office 1986–1991
- Preceded by: constituency created
- Succeeded by: Abdur Rouf

Personal details
- Born: 31 August 1947
- Died: 25 November 2021 (aged 74) Manhattan, New York
- Party: Jatiya Party (Ershad)
- Spouse: A. H. G. Mohiuddin
- Relatives: Mashiur Rahman (father); Shawfikul Ghaani Shapan (brother)

Begum Monsura Mohiuddin was a Jatiya Party (Ershad) politician and a former member of parliament for Nilphamari-1. She was the eldest daughter of former Senior Minister Mashiur Rahman (Jadu Mia) and sister of former cabinet minister Shawfikul Ghaani Shapan. She was married to former diplomat and Permanent Representative of Bangladesh to the United Nations A. H. G. Mohiuddin. She died on 25 November 2021.

== Career ==
Mohiuddin was elected to parliament from Nilphamari-1 as a Jatiya Party candidate in 1986 and 1988.
