= Mamta Wahab =

Bangladeshi politician

- মমতা ওয়াহাব

Deputy Minister of Health
- In office 1986–1991

Member of the Bangladesh Parliament for Mymensingh-4
- In office 15 April 1988 – 6 December 1990
- Preceded by: Motiur Rahman
- Succeeded by: AKM Fazlul Haque

Personal details
- Died: 2012
- Party: Jatiya Party (Ershad)
- Relations: Rowshan Ershad (sister); A. H. G. Mohiuddin (brother)

Mamta Wahab (died 2012) was a Jatiya Party (Ershad) politician in Bangladesh and a former member of parliament for Mymensingh-4. She was an elder sister of Rowshan Ershad and A. H. G. Mohiuddin.

== Career ==
Wahab was elected to parliament from Mymensingh-4 as a Jatiya Party candidate in 1988. She served as the deputy minister of health. Her sister, Rowshan Ershad, her brother-in-law, Hussain Mohammad Ershad, was the president of Bangladesh.

Wahab was arrested on 14 December 1991 after her brother-in-law was removed from power.
