= Uchakhila Union =

Uchakhila Union উচাখিলা ইউনিয়ন
- Union
- Location within Bangladesh
- Coordinates: 24.6833°N 90.6250°E
- Country: Bangladesh
- Division: Mymensingh
- District: Mymensingh
- Upazila: Ishwarganj
- Time zone: UTC+6 (BST)
- Postal code: 2280
- Website: uchakhilaup.mymensingh.gov.bd

Uchakhila Union (Bengali: উচাখিলা ইউনিয়ন) is a union parishad under Ishwarganj Upazila of Mymensingh District in the division of Mymensingh, Bangladesh.

== Geography ==
Uchakhila Union is bounded on the east by Barahit Union, on the west by Trishal and Gouripur Upazilas, on the south by Rajibpur Union and Trishal Upazila and on the north by Tarundia Union and Gouripur Upazila.

== Demographics ==
The total area of Uchakhila Union is 656 acres. According to the census report of the National Bureau of Statistics, the total population of the union in 2001 was 27,152 of which 14,035 were men and 13,117 were women.
