= Sohagi Union =

Union parishad in Bangladesh

Sohagi Union is a union parishad under Ishwarganj Upazila of Mymensingh District in the division of Mymensingh, Bangladesh.

== Geography ==
Sohagi Union is bounded on the east and north by Gouripur Upazila, on the west by Ishwarganj Union and on the south by Jatia and Sarisha Unions.

== Demographics ==
According to the National Bureau of Statistics of Bangladesh census report, the number of men and women in the union was 12,525 and 12,136 respectively in 2001.
