= Mymensingh-8 =

Constituency of Bangladesh's Jatiya Sangsad

Coordinates: 24.69°N 90.60°E

- Constituency for the Jatiya Sangsad
- District: Mymensingh District
- Division: Mymensingh Division
- Electorate: 348,879 (2026)

Current constituency
- Created: 1973
- Parliamentary Party: Bangladesh Nationalist Party
- Member of Parliament: Lutfullahel Majed
- ← 152 Mymensingh-7 154 Mymensingh-9 →

Mymensingh-8 is a constituency represented in the Jatiya Sangsad (National Parliament) of Bangladesh.

== Boundaries ==
The constituency encompasses Ishwarganj Upazila.

== History ==
The constituency was created for the first general elections in newly independent Bangladesh, held in 1973.

== Members of Parliament ==
Election	Member	Party
1973	Md. Abdul Halim	Bangladesh Awami League
1979	Shamsul Huda Chaudhury	Bangladesh Nationalist Party
1986	Hashim Uddin Ahmed	Jatiya Party (Ershad)
1988	Fakhrul Imam	Jatiya Party (Ershad)
1991	Khurram Khan Chowdhury	Jatiya Party (Ershad)
Feb 1996	Zainul Abedin	Bangladesh Nationalist Party
Jun 1996	Abdus Sattar	Bangladesh Awami League
2001	Shah Nurul Kabir	Bangladesh Nationalist Party
2008	Abdus Sattar	Bangladesh Awami League
2014	Fakhrul Imam	Jatiya Party (Ershad)
2018	Fakhrul Imam	Jatiya Party (Ershad)
2024	Mahmud Hasan Sumon	Independent
2026	Lutfullahel Majed	Bangladesh Nationalist Party

== Elections ==
=== Elections in the 2020s ===
General election 2026: Mymensingh-8
Party	Candidate	Votes	%	±%
BNP	Lutfullahel Majed	108,685	56.42	New
LDP	Md. Aurangzeb Belal	46,515	24.15	New
Majority		62,170	32.27	−32.03
Turnout		192,632	55.21	−15.15
Registered electors		348,879		
BNP gain from Independent				

=== Elections in the 2010s ===
Fakhrul Imam was elected unopposed in the 2014 general election after opposition parties withdrew their candidacies in a boycott of the election.

=== Elections in the 2000s ===
General Election 2008: Mymensingh-8
Party	Candidate	Votes	%	±%
AL	Abdus Sattar	121,163	68.0	+32.7
BNP	Shah Nurul Kabir	57,041	32.0	−10.8
Majority		64,122	36.0	+28.6
Turnout		178,204	84.3	+16.6
AL gain from BNP				

General Election 2001: Mymensingh-8
Party	Candidate	Votes	%	±%
BNP	Shah Nurul Kabir	59,159	42.8	+22.9
AL	Abdus Sattar	48,885	35.3	−1.9
Independent	Shoumendra Kishor Chowdhury	23,813	17.2	N/A
IJOF	S. M. Iqbal	6,065	4.4	N/A
Independent	Ahmmed Hossain Bhuiyan	403	0.3	+0.2
Majority		10,274	7.4	+6.2
Turnout		138,325	67.7	+10.0
BNP gain from AL				

=== Elections in the 1990s ===
General Election June 1996: Mymensingh-8
Party	Candidate	Votes	%	±%
AL	Abdus Sattar	34,029	37.2	N/A
JP(E)	Rowshan Ershad	32,908	36.0	+11.3
BNP	Khurram Khan Chowdhury	18,190	19.9	−0.6
Jamaat	A. K. M. Wali Ullah	5,438	5.9	N/A
Zaker Party	Harun Or Rashid	398	0.4	−0.4
Islamic Sashantantrik Andolan	Mustafa Anowarul Haque Khan	204	0.2	N/A
FP	Md. Abdul Gafur	154	0.2	−1.3
Independent	Ahmmed Hossain Bhuiyan	113	0.1	N/A
Majority		1,121	1.2	−3.0
Turnout		91,434	57.7	+12.7
AL gain from JP(E)				

General Election 1991: Mymensingh-8
Party	Candidate	Votes	%	±%
JP(E)	Khurram Khan Chowdhury	18,209	24.7	
BNP	Golam Nabi	15,095	20.5	
Independent	Md. Akhter Hossain Vuiyan	13,992	19.0	
Ganatantri Party	A. H. M. Khalequzzaman	13,340	18.1	
Independent	Md. Reza-e-Karim	9,453	12.8	
Bangladesh Janata Party	Md. Siraj Uddin	1,404	1.9	
FP	Md. Abdul Gafur	1,117	1.5	
Zaker Party	Harun Or Rashid	571	0.8	
Independent	Jainul Abedin	267	0.4	
Jatiya Samajtantrik Dal-JSD	Md. Saidur Rahman Vuiyan	193	0.3	
Independent	Anwarul Kadir	143	0.2	
Majority		3,114	4.2	
Turnout		73,784	45.0	
JP(E) hold				
