= Ahsan Ullah Mollah =

Bangladeshi social worker and politician

Ahsan Ullah Molla
- Born: 1876; Jat Amrul, Atrai, Naogaon
- Died: 1939 (aged 62–63); Atrai, Naogaon
- Occupations: Businessman and politician
- Notable work: Ahsanganj Railway Station
- Spouse: Rahima Khatun
- Relatives: Moslem Ali Molla (brother)

Ahsan Ullah Molla (1876–1939) was a prominent social worker and veteran politician of Bangladesh. He was a member of the Bengal Legislative Assembly.

== Early life ==
Molla was born in 1876 in Jat Amrul village of Atrai Upazila, Naogaon District. His father was Haji Aman Ullah Molla, and his mother was Firman Nesa. He inherrited his zamindari from his maternal grandfather. He married Bibi Rahima Khatun. Their youngest son, Molla Abul Kalam Azad, was a Tollywood actor, politician, and social worker.

== Career ==
Molla was a businessman known for his ventures in jute and salt trading. His business operations extended to around 22 locations in undivided Bengal and Assam. His jute business had links as far as London and Dundee in the United Kingdom.

Molla was a member of the Bengal Legislative Council. Throughout his political career, he was closely associated with figures such as Mahatma Gandhi, A. K. Fazlul Huq, Huseyn Shaheed Suhrawardy, and Subhas Chandra Bose.

Molla contributed significantly to the construction of various mosques and madrassas and undertook pond excavation projects. He was widely recognized for his philanthropy and humanitarian efforts, providing financial aid to the poor and needy.

== Death ==
Molla died in 1939. In Mollah's honor, several institutions in Atrai Upazila were named after him. The Ahsan Ullah Memorial High School was established in his name. During British India, he founded a railway station called Atrai Ghat, which was later renamed Ahsanganj Railway Station after him. Additionally, the post office in Atrai was also named after him.
