= Abdul Malek (Awami League politician) =

Bangladeshi politician

Member of the Bangladesh Parliament for Mymensingh-4
- In office 1973–1975
- Succeeded by: Zainul Abedin

Personal details
- Born: 1 September 1934 Jamalpur
- Died: 19 January 2016 Jamalpur District
- Party: Bangladesh Awami League
- Children: 6 sons, 4 daughters

Abdul Malek (1 September 1934 – 19 January 2016) was a Bangladesh Awami League politician and a member of parliament for Mymensingh-4. He was an organizer of the Liberation War of Bangladesh.

== Career ==
Abdul Malek was elected to the Provincial Assembly of East Pakistan for constituency Mymensingh-IV in 1970. He was an organizer of the Liberation War of Bangladesh.

After the independence of Bangladesh, he was elected to parliament from Mymensingh-4 as a Bangladesh Awami League candidate in 1973.
