= Raktadaha River =

Bil in Naogaon & Bogura, Bangladesh

Raktadaha Bil Raktadaha Bil
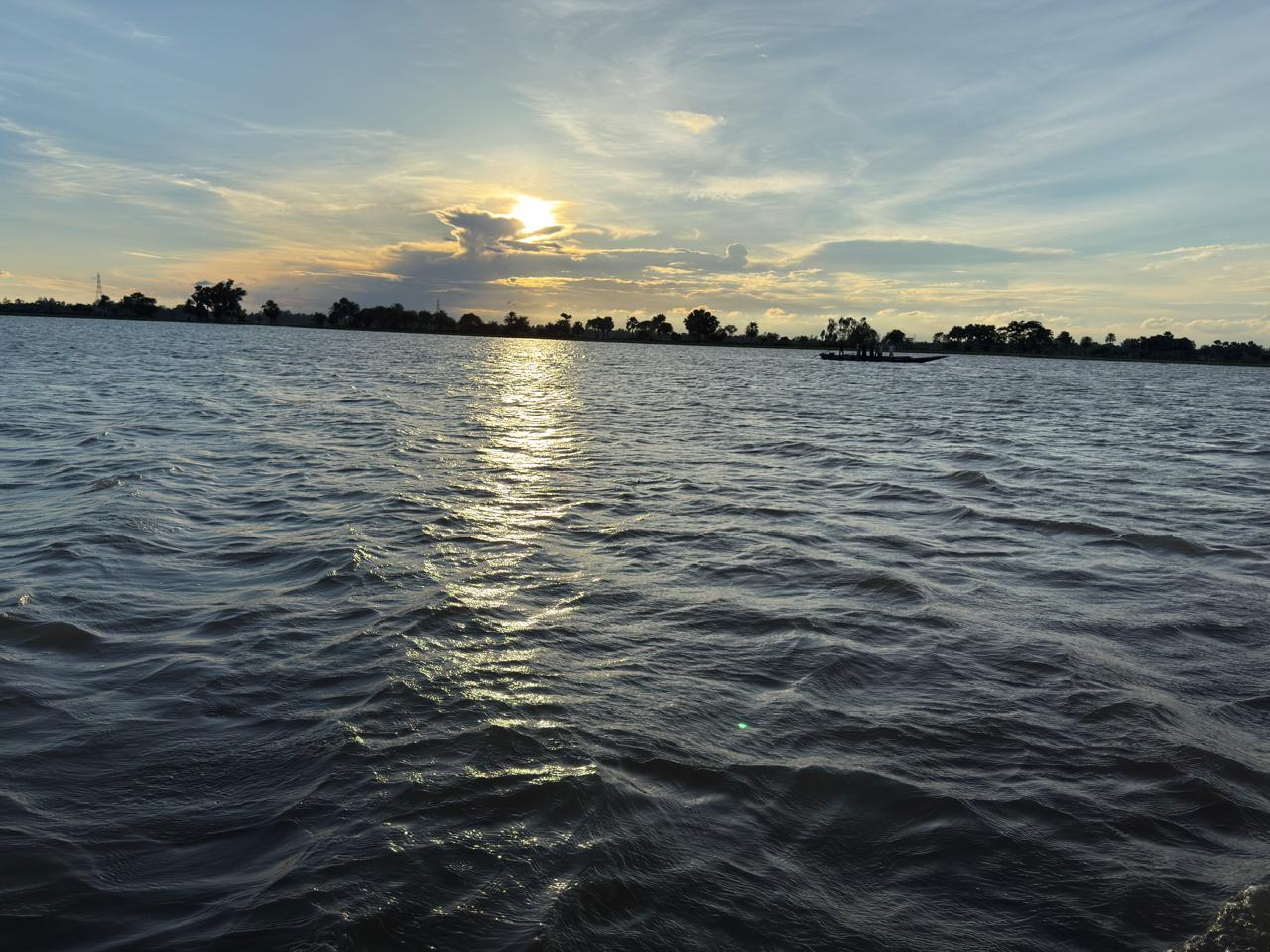

- Location of Raktadaha River in Bangladesh
- Etymology: Named after the blood-red waters during historical battles
- Nickname: Blood Lake Wetland
- Native name: রক্তদহ বিল (Bengali)

Location
- Country: Bangladesh
- Districts: Naogaon, Bogra
- Upazilas: Raninagar, Adamdighi

Physical characteristics
- Mouth
  - coordinates: 24.6236°N 88.9930°E

Basin features
- Landmarks: Raktadaha Dargah, Banyan tree
- Waterbodies: Thirteen canals and waterways
- Historical significance: Site of battles led by Fakir Majnu Shah against the East India Company

Raktadaha Bil is a river in the northern region of Bangladesh. A part of this river appears like a large wetland and is one of the largest wetlands in the area. It stretches across the Raninagar Upazila of Naogaon District and the Adamdighi Upazila of Bogra District. Thirteen canals and other waterways flow through the Raktadaha wetland.

== History ==
Fakir Majnu Shah, along with his armed followers, used to launch expeditions almost every year from this location to various parts of Bengal and Bihar, which were then under the control of the East India Company. His campaign regions mainly included Pania in Bihar and the districts of Rangpur, Dinajpur, Rajshahi, Cooch Behar, Jalpaiguri, Malda, Sirajganj, Pabna, and Mymensingh in Bengal. In August 1786, he clashed with Lieutenant Ayn Shine at a location 35 miles from Bogra. Research shows that this place is the Raktadaha wetland in the Adamdighi Thana. A large number of English soldiers were killed and injured here, and a flood of blood reportedly flowed, which is why the area came to be known as Raktadaha Bil ("Blood Lake Wetland"). A martyred Islamic Mujahid from the Fakir forces is buried in the Raktadaha Bil. The shrine here is locally known as Raktadaha Dargah.

In another battle between Majnu Shah and the British soldiers, so many people were killed and injured that the waters of Bil Bhomra turned red from the flood of blood, and since then, Bil Bhomra has been historically known as Raktadaha Bil. In that battle, one of Majnu Shah's top associates was killed. His body was buried on a slightly elevated spot in the wetland. A banyan tree still stands there to this day.
