= Seikh Md. Rejaul Islam =

Bangladeshi politician

Sheikh Md. Rejaul Islam
- শেখ মোঃ রেজাউল ইসলাম

Member of the Bangladesh Parliament for Naogaon-6
- Incumbent
- Assumed office 17 February 2026
- Preceded by: Anwar Hossain Helal

Personal details
- Born: 13 May 1959 (age 67) Jatamrul, Atrai Upazila, Naogaon District
- Party: Bangladesh Nationalist Party

Sheikh Md. Rejaul Islam is a Bangladeshi politician of the Bangladesh Nationalist Party. He is currently serving as a member of parliament from Naogaon-6.

== Early life ==
Islam was born on 13 May 1959 in Atrai Upazila in Naogaon District.
