= Motiur Rahman (politician, born 1942) =

Bangladeshi politician (1942–2023)

Principal Motiur Rahman
- মতিউর রহমান
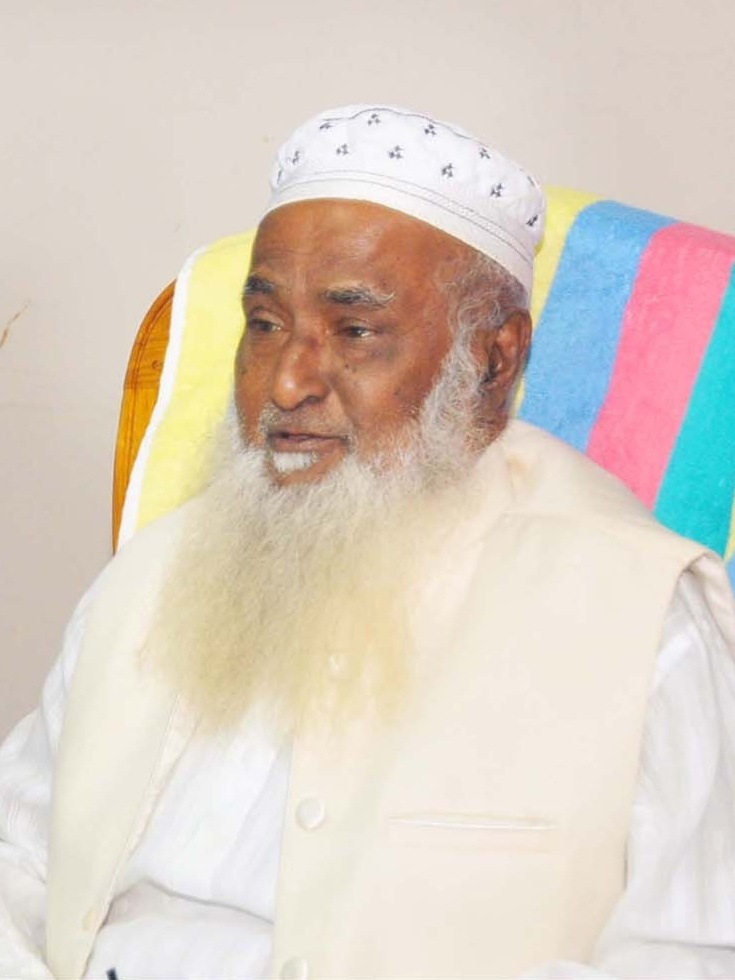
- Rahman in 2018

Minister of Religious Affairs
- In office 12 January 2014 – 7 November 2018

Member of the Bangladesh Parliament for Mymensingh-4
- In office 25 January 2009 – 24 January 2014
- Preceded by: Delwar Hossain Khan Dulu
- Succeeded by: Rowshan Ershad
- In office 10 July 1986 – 6 December 1987
- Preceded by: Zainul Abedin
- Succeeded by: Begum Mamta Wahab

Personal details
- Born: 8 February 1942 Mymensingh District, Bengal Province, British India
- Died: 27 August 2023 (aged 81) Mymensingh, Bangladesh
- Party: Bangladesh Awami League
- Children: Mohit Ur Rahman Shanto (son)
- Education: University of Dhaka; Ananda Mohan College; Mymensingh Zilla School

Motiur Rahman (8 February 1942 – 27 August 2023) was a Bangladesh Awami League politician who served as the Minister of Religious Affairs during 2014–2018.

== Early life ==
Motiur Rahman was born on 8 February 1942 in Akua, Mymensingh Sadar Upazila, Mymensingh District in the then Bengal Province, British India. He graduated from Akua Model Primary School in 1953. He joined Mymensingh Zilla School in 1957 and then went to Nokla High School. In 1961, he graduated from Ananda Mohan College and in 1964 he earned his undergraduate degree from the same college. In 1967, he graduated with a master's in zoology from the University of Dhaka.

== Career ==
Motiur Rahman started teaching at Nandina College in Jamalpur District and then taught at the Nasirabad College in Mymensingh District. In 1969, he founded the Alamgir Mansur Mintu Memorial College and served as its principal until 2002. In 1971, he fought in the Bangladesh Liberation War. He taught for awhile at the Mymensingh College. In 2002, he founded "Matiur Rahman Academy School and College" and appointed himself as its principal. He founded Nasirabad Girls' School, Shaheed Syed Nazrul Islam College, and Meher Razzak Private Primary School. He served as the chairman of Nasirabad College, Mymensingh, Mymensingh College, Mymensingh Women's Degree College, Islamic Academy and Akuabari Madrasa Management Committee.

Motiur Rahman served as the general secretary of Mymensingh District Awami League. He was elected to the parliament from Mymensingh-4 constituency in 1986 and 2008. On 12 January 2014, he was appointed the Minister of Religious Affairs.

Motiur Rahman named a government funded hospital after his deceased son which generated controversy in the news media about the appropriate use of public funds. He famously used Arabic language inscriptions on walls to prevent public urination.

On 22 January 2022, Motiur Rahman was awarded the Ekushey Padak, the second most important award for civilians in Bangladesh.

== Personal life ==
His son Mohit Ur Rahman Shanto won for the Bangladesh Awami League in the 2024 National Parliament election from Mymensingh-4.

== Death ==
Motiur Rahman died on 27 August 2023, at the age of 81.
