= Mohit Ur Rahman Shanto =

Bangladeshi Politician

Mohammad Mohit Ur Rahman Shanto
- মোহাম্মদ মোহিত উর রহমান শান্ত
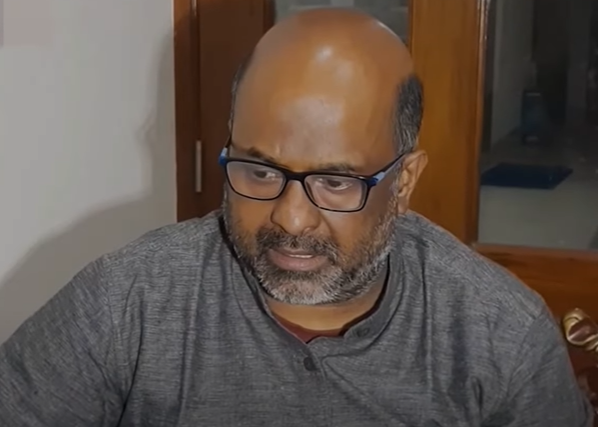
- Shanto in 2023

Member of the Bangladesh Parliament for Mymensingh-4
- In office 10 January 2024 – 6 August 2024
- Preceded by: Rowshan Ershad
- Succeeded by: Md. Abu Wahab Akanda Wahid

Personal details
- Born: 14 June 1977 (age 49) Mymensingh Sadar, Mymensingh, Bangladesh
- Parent: Motiur Rahman (father)
- Education: Delhi University; Ananda Mohan College

Mohammad Mohit Ur Rahman Shanto (born 14 June 1977) is a Bangladeshi politician and a former Jatiya Sangsad member representing the Mymensingh-4 constituency. He won for the Bangladesh Awami League in the 2024 Bangladeshi general election. Shanto is the son of former religion minister Matiur Rahman. He was also a councillor of the Bangladesh Cricket Board from Mymensingh.

== Early life and education ==
Mohit's father was Motiur Rahman, a freedom fighter (Muktijodhha), political leader, ex-Jatiya Sangsad member from Mymensingh-4 constituency, who served as the Minister of Religious Affairs during 2014–2018. Shanto was a graduate of English Literature, University of Delhi. Having begun his career in the private sector as an entrepreneur, Mohit Ur Rahman embraced full-time politics in 2016.

== Political career ==
Mohit Ur Rahman elected twice in a row as the General Secretary, Mymensingh Metropolitan Awami league. Bangladesh Awamileague has declared him as the for the upcoming National Election in 2024.
