= Nazrul Islam (Mymensingh-5 politician) =

Bangladeshi politician

- নজরুল ইসলাম

Member of the Bangladesh Parliament for Mymensingh-5
- In office 30 January 2024 – 6 August 2024
- Preceded by: K. M. Khalid

Personal details
- Born: 25 February 1960 (age 66) Muktagacha, Mymensingh
- Party: Bangladesh Awami League
- Occupation: Politician and Agriculturist

Nazrul Islam is a Mymensingh politician. He is a former Jatiya Sangsad member representing the Mymensingh-5 constituency in 2024.

== Early life ==
Nazrul Islam was born on 25 February 1960 at Muktagacha Upazila in Mymensingh.

== Political life ==
Nazrul Islam was nominated as a Member of Parliament as a candidate of Independent from Mymensingh-5 constituency in 2024 Twelfth National Parliament Election.
