= Zeenat Mosharraf =

Bangladeshi politician

- জ়িনাত মোশাররফ

Jatiya Sangsad member from the Reserved Women's Seat - 29
- In office 1996–2001

Personal details
- Party: Jatiya Party
- Spouse: A. K. M. Mosharraf Hossain

Zeenat Mosharraf (Bengali: জ়িনাত মোশাররফ, Bengali pronunciation: [ziinat moʃarːɔf]) is a Bangladesh Jatiya Party politician and the former Jatiya Sangsad member from the reserved women's seat 29.

== Career ==
Mosharraf and her husband were arrested in 1990 and sentenced to 120 years in jail under the Special Powers Act after the fall of the Hussain Mohammad Ershad government. She was elected to parliament from a reserved seat for women in 1996 as a Jatiya Party candidate.

== Personal life ==
Mosharraf was married to A. K. M. Mosharraf Hossain, a Bangladesh Nationalist Party politician and the former State Minister of Energy. In 1990, Dainik Bangla, a government-owned daily, claimed the former Bangladesh President Hossain Mohammad Ershad and Mosharraf used to meet at a guest house owned by the Bangladesh Chemical Industries Corporation. Her husband was the company's chairman until 1988 when he was given a job in Ershad's government as secretary of the Ministry of Industries. He issued a divorce notice on 17 April 1997 when Ershad had admitted to a 14-year affair with her. The then mayor of Dhaka, Mohammad Hanif, mediated the reconciliation between them on the last day of the three month time-limit following the divorce notice.

As of July 2019, Mosharraf has been living in London, England.
