= Maijbagh Union =

Maijbagh Union মাইজবাগ ইউনিয়ন
- Union
- Location within Bangladesh
- Coordinates: 24.630418°N 90.610800°E
- Country: Bangladesh
- Division: Mymensingh
- District: Mymensingh
- Upazila: Ishwarganj

Area
  - Land: 29.71 km^{2} (11.47 sq mi)

Population (2001)
  - Total: 38,848
  - Density: 1,308/km^{2} (3,387/sq mi)
- Time zone: UTC+6 (BST)
- Postal code: 2280
- Website: maijbaghup.mymensingh.gov.bd

Maijbagh Union (Bengali: মাইজবাগ ইউনিয়ন; alternate spelling Maijbag) is a union parishad under Ishwarganj Upazila of Mymensingh District in the division of Mymensingh, Bangladesh. It has an area of 29.71 square kilometres and a population of 38848.

== Geography ==
Maijbagh Union is bounded on the east by Jatia Union, on the west by Barahit Union, on the south by Magtula Union and Nandail Upazila and on the north by Ishwarganj Union.

== Demographics ==
The union has a total area of 29.71 km^{2} and a total of 27 villages. According to the Bangladesh National Portal, a total population of 38,848 lives in 7,150 households, of which males and females number 19,704 and 18,692 respectively. According to the census report of the National Bureau of Statistics of Bangladesh, the number of males and females in 2001 was 18,620 and 17,874 respectively.

== Places of interest ==
- Kumuria Bill
- Andar Dighighat
