= Mymensingh-5 =

Constituency of Bangladesh's Jatiya Sangsad

Coordinates: 24.77°N 90.26°E

- Constituency for the Jatiya Sangsad
- District: Mymensingh District
- Division: Mymensingh Division
- Electorate: 306,525 (2018)

Current constituency
- Created: 1973
- Party: Bangladesh Nationalist Party
- Member: Mohammed Zakir Hossain
- ← 149 Mymensingh-4 151 Mymensingh-6 →

Mymensingh-5 is a constituency represented in the Jatiya Sangsad (National Parliament) of Bangladesh since 2026 by Mohammed Zakir Hossain of the Bangladesh Nationalist Party.

== Boundaries ==
The constituency encompasses Muktagacha Upazila.

== History ==
The constituency was created for the first general elections in newly independent Bangladesh, held in 1973.

== Members of Parliament ==
Election	Member	Party
1973	Mohammad Abdul Hakim	Awami League
1979	Khurram Khan Chowdhury	Bangladesh Nationalist Party
1986	Shamsul Huda Chaudhury	Jatiya Party
1991	Keramat Ali Talukdar	Bangladesh Nationalist Party
Feb 1996	Abu Reza Fazlul Haque Bablu	Bangladesh Nationalist Party
Jun 1996	A. K. M. Mosharraf Hossain	Bangladesh Nationalist Party
2008	K. M. Khalid	Awami League
2014	Salahuddin Ahmed Mukti	Jatiya Party (Ershad)
2018	K. M. Khalid	Awami League
2024	Nazrul Islam	Independent
2026	Mohammed Zakir Hossain	Bangladesh Nationalist Party

== Elections ==
=== Elections in the 2010s ===
Salahuddin Ahmed Mukti was elected unopposed in the 2014 general election after opposition parties withdrew their candidacies in a boycott of the election.

=== Elections in the 2000s ===
General Election 2008: Mymensingh-5
Party	Candidate	Votes	%	±%
AL	K. M. Khalid	121,255	58.9	+15.5
BNP	Mohammed Zakir Hossain	81,205	39.5	−13.6
BKM	Habibur Rahman	2,275	1.1	N/A
KSJL	Md. Sayed Ali	439	0.2	−0.1
IAB	Md. Tafazzul Hossain	346	0.2	N/A
BDB	Sayed Mizanur Rahman	320	0.2	N/A
Majority		40,050	19.5	+9.8
Turnout		205,840	85.9	+11.9
AL gain from BNP				

General Election 2001: Mymensingh-5
Party	Candidate	Votes	%	±%
BNP	A. K. M. Mosharraf Hossain	90,501	53.1	+13.0
AL	Rashida Mohiuddin	74,033	43.4	+5.5
IJOF	Abul Bari	4,600	2.7	N/A
KSJL	Biswajit Nandi	579	0.3	N/A
WPB	Paresh Chandra Saha	296	0.2	N/A
BKA	Md. Amjat Hossain	285	0.2	N/A
Jatiya Party (M)	Chowdhury A. Mannan	171	0.1	N/A
Majority		16,468	9.7	+7.5
Turnout		170,465	74.0	+6.6
BNP hold				

=== Elections in the 1990s ===
General Election June 1996: Mymensingh-5
Party	Candidate	Votes	%	±%
BNP	A. K. M. Mosharraf Hossain	48,330	40.1	−6.8
AL	Shamsul Huda Chaudhury	45,706	37.9	+5.1
JP(E)	Abul Bari	19,169	15.9	+7.7
Jamaat	Sirajul Islam Khan	4,702	3.9	−5.3
IOJ	Mansurul Haque Khan	1,965	1.6	N/A
Zaker Party	Sujat Hossain Khan	798	0.7	−0.7
Majority		2,624	2.2	−11.9
Turnout		120,670	67.4	+22.1
BNP hold				

General Election 1991: Mymensingh-5
Party	Candidate	Votes	%	±%
BNP	Keramat Ali Talukdar	38,126	46.9	
AL	Shamsul Haque	26,675	32.8	
Jamaat	Sirajul Islam Khan	7,494	9.2	
JP(E)	Md. Isahaq Ali Sarkar	6,628	8.2	
Zaker Party	Sujat Hossain Khan	1,142	1.4	
Jatia Mukti Dal	Kh. A. Malek	945	1.2	
WPB	Paresh Chandra Saha	319	0.4	
Majority		11,451	14.1	
Turnout		81,329	45.3	
BNP gain from JP(E)				
