= Moslem Ali Mollah =

East Pakistan member of parliament

Maulvi Moslem Ali Mollah
- মোসলেম আলী মোল্লা

Member of the National Assembly of Pakistan
- In office 1955–1958
- President: Iskander Mirza
- Prime Minister: A. K. Fazlul Huq; Amiruddin Ahmad

Member of the Bengal Legislative Assembly
- In office 1937–1945
- Prime Minister: Khawaja Nazimuddin; A. K. Fazlul Huq
- Succeeded by: Madar Bux
- Constituency: Rajshahi Central

Personal details
- Born: Jat Amrul, Rajshahi district, Bengal Presidency

Moslem Ali Mollah (Bengali: মোসলেম আলী মোল্লা) was a Bengali politician, jute merchant and philanthropist. He was a member of the 1st Bengal Legislative Assembly and the 2nd National Assembly of Pakistan. Mollah contributed greatly to the independence movement against the British Raj.

== Early life and family ==
Mollah was born into the Mollah clan of Jat Amrul in Atraighat (now Ahsanganj), a Bengali family of Muslim jotedars based in Atrai, Naogaon. He was the son of Haji Aman Ullah Mollah. Mollah was the younger brother of zamindar-philanthropist Ahsan Ullah Mollah, a jute merchant who served as a representative of the Rally Brothers Company and as a member of the Bengal Legislative Council.

== Career ==
Mollah was one of the leaders of the Non-cooperation movement and Khilafat Movement across Naogaon subdivision. He donated 10,000 rupees to Mahatma Gandhi. Mollah was a founding member of the Rajshahi Muslim Society. He was the president of the Atraighat Union Board, later renamed to Ahsanganj after his elder brother.

Mollah won a seat at the Rajshahi Central constituency at the Bengal Legislative Assembly following the 1937 elections. He was a Member of the 2nd National Assembly of Pakistan from 1955 to 1958.
