= Magtula Union =

Magtula Union মগটুলা ইউনিয়ন
- Union
- Location within Bangladesh
- Coordinates: 24.5995°N 90.5997°E
- Country: Bangladesh
- Division: Mymensingh
- District: Mymensingh
- Upazila: Ishwarganj

Area
  - Land: 23.87 km^{2} (9.22 sq mi)

Population (2011)
  - Total: 30,922
  - Density: 1,295/km^{2} (3,355/sq mi)
- Time zone: UTC+6 (BST)
- Postal code: 2280
- Website: magtulaup.mymensingh.gov.bd

Magtula Union (Bengali: মগটুলা ইউনিয়ন; alternet spelling Maktula Union) is a union parishad under Ishwarganj Upazila of Mymensingh District in the division of Mymensingh, Bangladesh. It has an area of 23.87 square kilometres and a population of 30,922.

== Geography ==
Magtula Union is bounded on the east by Maijbagh Union, on the west by Rajibpur Union, on the south by Nandail Upazila and on the north by Barahit and Maijbagh Unions.

== Demographics ==
According to the National Bureau of Statistics of Bangladesh census report, the number of men and women in the Magatula Union in 2001 is 15,687 and 15,235 respectively.
