= Md. Abdul Halim =

Bangladeshi politician

Member of Bangladesh Parliament
- In office 1973–1979
- Succeeded by: Shamsul Huda Chaudhury

Personal details
- Party: Bangladesh Awami League

Md. Abdul Halim is a Bangladesh Awami League politician and a former member of parliament for Mymensingh-8.

== Career ==
Halim was elected to parliament from Mymensingh-8 as a Bangladesh Awami League candidate in 1973.
