= Shah Nurul Kabir =

Bangladeshi politician

Member of Bangladesh Parliament

Personal details
- Party: Bangladesh Nationalist Party

Shah Nurul Kabir Shaheen is a Bangladesh Nationalist Party politician and a former member of parliament for Mymensingh-8.

== Career ==
Shaheen was elected to parliament from Mymensingh-8 as a Bangladesh Nationalist Party candidate in 2001. He is the convener of the Ishwarganj Upazila unit of the Bangladesh Nationalist Party. On 9 October 2018, he was arrested under Special Powers Act. Shaheen and his party leaders maintain that these alleged charges were brought on by the local leaders of Awami League and are politically motivated.
