= Islamganthi Mosque =

Mosque in Naogaon, Rajshahi, Bangladesh

- ইসলামগাঁথী মসজিদ
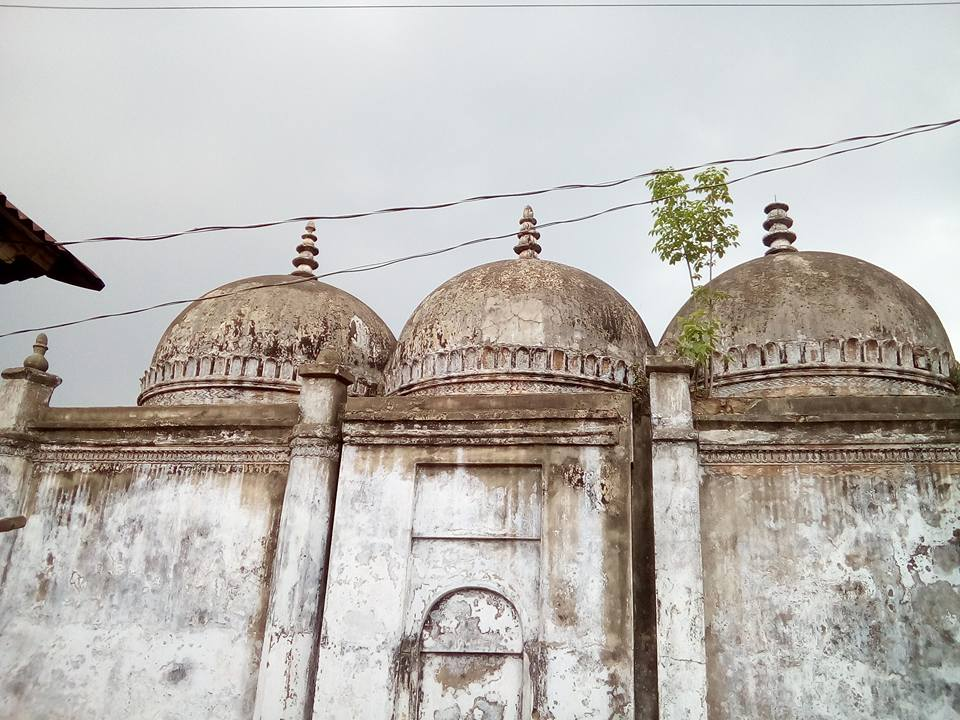

- Location of the mosque in Bangladesh

Religion
- Affiliation: Sunni Islam
- Ecclesiastical or organizational status: Friday mosque
- Status: Active

Location
- Location: Islamganthi, Atrai Upazila, Naogaon District, Rajshahi Division
- Country: Bangladesh
- Interactive map of Islamganthi Mosque
- Coordinates: 24°35′42″N 89°01′31″E

Architecture
- Type: Mosque architecture
- Style: Islamic; Mughal
- Groundbreaking: 1608
- Completed: 1613
- Dome: Three

The Islamganthi Mosque (Bengali: ইসলামগাঁথী মসজিদ; Arabic: مسجد إسلامغاتي), and also known as the Islamganthi Jame Mosque, and sometimes spelled as the Islamganti Mosque (Bengali: ইসলামগাঁতী মসজিদ), is a Sunni Friday mosque, located in the village of Islamganthi, in Bisha Union, Atrai Upazila, Naogaon District, in the Rajshahi Division of Bangladesh. The seventeenth-century mosque dates from the Mughal era, and is situated on the banks of the Atrai River.

== History ==
Researchers have hypothesised that the mosque was constructed by Islam Khan I during his term as the Mughal Subahdar of Bengal which lasted between 1608 and 1613. Many villages in the area are named after the governor.

== Architecture ==
The mosque has three circular domes which sit on top of each of the mosque's three rooms.

== See also ==
- Islam in Bangladesh
- List of mosques in Bangladesh
