= Rowshan Ershad =

Bangladeshi politician and former first lady

Begum Rowshan Ershad
- রওশন এরশাদ
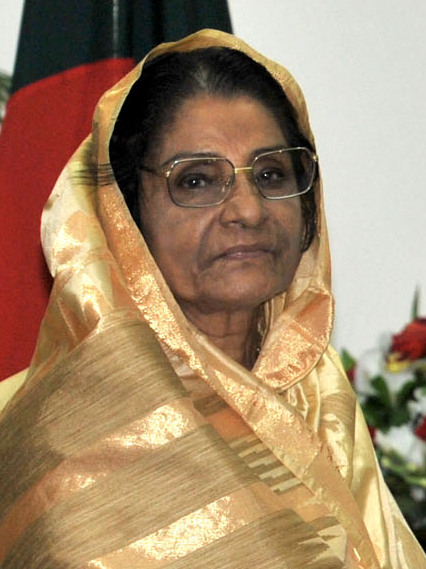
- Ershad in 2017

Chief Patron of Jatiya Party (Ershad)
- Incumbent
- Assumed office 28 January 2024
- Leader: disputed with GM Quader
- Preceded by: GM Quader

6th Leader of the Opposition
- In office 9 September 2019 – 10 January 2024
- Prime Minister: Sheikh Hasina
- Preceded by: Hussain Muhammad Ershad
- Succeeded by: GM Quader
- In office 9 January 2014 – 3 January 2019
- Prime Minister: Sheikh Hasina
- Preceded by: Khaleda Zia
- Succeeded by: Hussain Muhammad Ershad

Member of the Bangladesh Parliament for Mymensingh-4
- In office 12 January 2014 – 10 January 2024
- Preceded by: Motiur Rahman
- Succeeded by: Mohit Ur Rahman Shanto
- In office 23 June 1996 – 15 July 2001
- Preceded by: A. K. M. Fazlul Haque
- Succeeded by: Delwar Hossain Khan Dulu

Minister of Health and Family Welfare
- In office 21 November 2013 – 6 January 2014
- Prime Minister: Sheikh Hasina
- Preceded by: AFM Ruhal Haque
- Succeeded by: Mohammed Nasim

9th First Lady of Bangladesh
- In office 11 December 1983 – 6 December 1990
- President: Hussain Muhammad Ershad
- Preceded by: Name unavailable
- Succeeded by: Anowara Begum (acting)

Personal details
- Born: 19 July 1943 (age 83)
- Party: Jatiya Party (Ershad)
- Spouse: Hussain Muhammad Ershad (m. 1956; death 2019)
- Relations: Mamta Wahab (sister); A. H. G. Mohiuddin (brother)
- Children: 2, including Saad Ershad

Begum Rowshan Ershad (born 19 July 1943) is a Jatiya Party (Ershad) politician from Bangladesh. She was the former Jatiya Sangsad member from the Mymensingh-4 constituency and the former leader of the opposition in the 11th parliament. She was the chief patron of the Jatiya Party (Ershad) and the widow of former Bangladeshi president Hussain Muhammad Ershad. Currently she is leading her own faction, Jatiya Party (Rowshan), which is different from Jatiya Party (Ershad).

== Political career ==
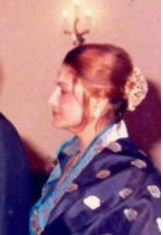
Rowshad Ershad at SAARC. 1986

As the first lady during 1982–1990, Ershad was active in social welfare and in promoting the rights of women and children. She was the chief patron of the Bangladesh Jatiya Mohila Sangstha.

In 1975, Ershad became the founder-president of the Sena Paribar Kalyan Samity (Armed Forces Family Welfare Association). She attended the UN Special Convention on Drug Abuse in 1985.

In November 2023, Ershad announced she would not participate in the 2024 Bangladeshi general election.

In May 2025, Ershad's ancestral home in Mymensingh was vandalized on Thursday by members of the Anti-Discrimination Student Movement protesting its conversion into a commercial restaurant. Activists had earlier demanded the site be turned into a July Memorial Museum, calling the house "Dalal Mahal" following the fall of the Sheikh Hasina-led Awami League government. Despite submitting a memorandum to local authorities, construction continued, prompting the attack led by student leader Walid Ahmed.

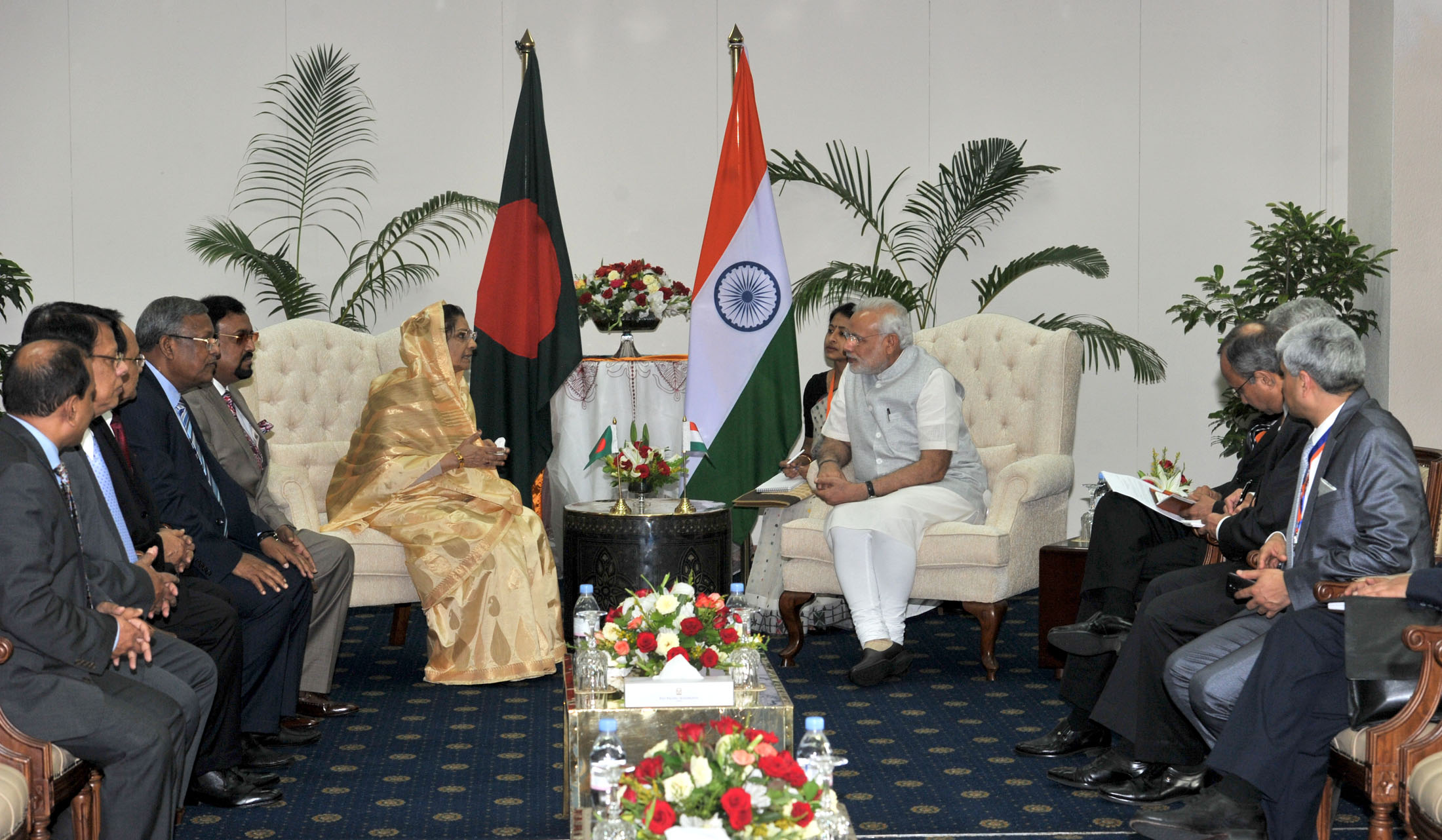
Rowshan with Indian Prime Minister Narendra Modi in June 2015 in Dhaka

== Personal life ==
Rowshan married Hussain Muhammad Ershad in 1956. Together they had a son, Saad Ershad, and a daughter, Jebin.
