= Zainul Abedin (Mymensingh politician) =

Bangladeshi politician

- জয়নুল আবেদীন জায়েদী

Member of the Bangladesh Parliament for Mymensingh-4
- In office 1979–1982
- Preceded by: Md. Abdul Maleque
- Succeeded by: Motiur Rahman

Member of the Bangladesh Parliament for Mymensingh-8
- In office February 1996 – June 1996
- Preceded by: Khurram Khan Chowdhury
- Succeeded by: Abdus Sattar

Personal details
- Born: Zainul Abedin Zaidi c. 1944
- Died: 11 January 2014
- Party: LDP
- Other political affiliations: Bangladesh Nationalist Party

Zainul Abedin (c. 1944 – 11 January 2014) was a Bangladesh Nationalist Party politician and a member of parliament for Mymensingh-4 and Mymensingh-8.

== Career ==
Abedin was a lawyer and politician. he was elected to parliament from Mymensingh-4 as a Bangladesh Nationalist Party candidate in 1979. He was elected to parliament from Mymensingh-8 as a Bangladesh Nationalist Party candidate in 15 February 1996 Bangladeshi general election. He was the president of Ishwarganj Upazila BNP.

He joined the Liberal Democratic Party (LDP) on 26 October 2006 and served as a presidium member and president of the Mymensingh district LDP.

== Death ==
Zainul Abedin died on 11 January 2014.
