= Mullah Rezaul Islam =

Bangladeshi politician

Member of Bangladesh Parliament
- In office 1988–1991
- Preceded by: Ohidur Rahman
- Succeeded by: Alamgir Kabir

Personal details
- Party: Jatiya Party (Ershad)

Mullah Rezaul Islam is a Jatiya Party (Ershad) politician in Bangladesh and a former member of parliament for Naogaon-6.

== Career ==
Islam was elected to parliament from Naogaon-6 in 1988.
