= Israfil Alam =

Bangladeshi politician (1966–2020)

- ইসরাফিল আলম

Member of the Bangladesh Parliament for Naogaon-6
- In office 25 January 2009 – 27 July 2020
- Preceded by: Alamgir Kabir
- Succeeded by: Anwar Hossain Helal

Personal details
- Born: 13 March 1966 Naogaon, East Pakistan, Pakistan
- Died: 27 July 2020 (aged 54) Dhaka, Bangladesh
- Party: Bangladesh Awami League

Israfil Alam (13 March 1966 – 27 July 2020) was a Bangladesh Awami League politician and a 3-term Jatiya Sangsad member representing the Naogaon-6 constituency.

== Career ==
Alam had a very humble beginning as a meter reader for the Titas Gas Transmission and Distribution Company. He then got involved in labor movement and rose to the prominence by being elected as the CBA President of Titas Gas. Later he was inducted as the General Secretary of Sramik League, the labor wing of Bangladesh Awami League. He was elected to the parliament from Naogaon-6 in 2008 as a Bangladesh Awami League candidate.

He was the chairman of the parliamentary standing committee on the Labour and Employment Ministry.

He was chairman of board of trustees in Atish Dipankar University of Science and Technology.

== Death ==
Alam died from COVID-19 complications at Square Hospital in Dhaka on 27 July 2020, during the COVID-19 pandemic in Bangladesh.
