= Ishwarganj Union =

Ishwarganj Union ঈশ্বরগঞ্জ ইউনিয়ন
- Union
- Location within Bangladesh
- Coordinates: 24.6833°N 90.6250°E
- Country: Bangladesh
- Division: Mymensingh
- District: Mymensingh
- Upazila: Ishwarganj

Population (2001)
  - Total: 20,184
- Time zone: UTC+6 (BST)
- Postal code: 2280
- Website: official website

Ishwarganj Union (Bengali: ঈশ্বরগঞ্জ ইউনিয়ন) is a union parishad under Ishwarganj Upazila of Mymensingh District in the division of Mymensingh, Bangladesh.

== Geography ==
Ishwarganj Union is bounded on the east by Jatia and Sohagi Unions, on the west by Barahit Union and Gouripur Upazila, on the south by Maijbag and Jatia Union and on the north by Gouripur Upazila.

== Demographics ==
The total area of Ishwarganj Union is 619 acres. According to the census report of the National Bureau of Statistics of Bangladesh, the total population of the union in 2001 was 20,184, of which 10,484 were males and 9,700 were females.
