= A. H. S. Ataul Karim =

Bangladeshi diplomat

- এ. এইচ. এস. আতাউল করিম
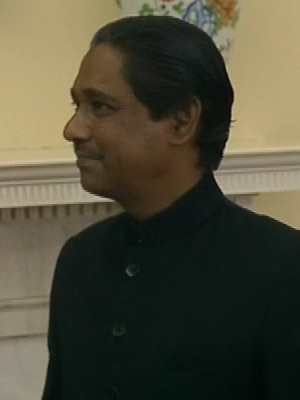
- Karim in 1988

Ambassador of Bangladesh to the United States
- In office December 1987 – September 1991
- Preceded by: Abu Zafar Obaidullah
- Succeeded by: Abul Ahsan

Permanent Representative of Bangladesh to the United Nations
- In office 1988–1990
- Preceded by: B. A. Siddiqi
- Succeeded by: A. H. G. Mohiuddin

Ambassador of Bangladesh to Indonesia
- In office 6 April 1976 – 3 July 1979
- Preceded by: Khurram Khan Panni
- Succeeded by: Shamsul Islam

Personal details
- Born: 1931/1932
- Died: 28 July 2010 (aged 78) Dhaka, Bangladesh

A. H. S. Ataul Karim (1931/1932 – 28 July 2010) was a Bangladesh diplomat, foreign secretary, and an ambassador of Bangladesh to the United States and Indonesia. He was also a Permanent Representative of Bangladesh to the United Nations.

== Career ==
Ataul Karim served as the chairperson of a meeting of foreign secretaries of South Asian Association for Regional Cooperation countries from 28 March to 30 March 1983.

In 1986, Karim served as the Permanent Representative of Bangladesh to the United Nations in Geneva.

On 16 August 1988, Karim was appointed the Permanent Representative of Bangladesh to the United Nations.

In 1991, Karim was appointed the head of the United Nations Mission in Cambodia, UN Advance Mission in Cambodia (UNAMIC), and Chief Liaison Officer. Previously he was the Ambassador of Bangladesh to the United States.

== Death ==
Karim died on 28 July 2010 at the Japan-Bangladesh Friendship Hospital, Dhaka, Bangladesh from lung cancer.
