= Keramat Ali Talukdar =

Bangladesh Nationalist Party Politician

Member of Bangladesh Parliament
- In office 1991–1996
- Preceded by: Shamsul Huda Chaudhury
- Succeeded by: A. K. M. Mosharraf Hossain

Personal details
- Party: Bangladesh Nationalist Party

Keramat Ali Talukdar is a Bangladesh Nationalist Party politician and a former member of parliament for Mymensingh-5.

== Career ==
Talukdar completed a Bachelor of Arts. In the 1965 East Pakistan Provincial Assembly election, he was elected for constituency Mymensingh-XI.

Talukdar was elected to parliament from Mymensingh-5 as a Bangladesh Nationalist Party candidate in 1991.
