= Naogaon-6 =

Constituency of Bangladesh's Jatiya Sangsad

Coordinates: 24.74°N 88.96°E

- Constituency for the Jatiya Sangsad
- District: Naogaon District
- Division: Rajshahi Division
- Electorate: 294,493 (2018)

Current constituency
- Created: 1984
- Party: Bangladesh Nationalist Party
- Member: Seikh Md. Rejaul Islam
- ← 50 Naogaon-5 52 Rajshahi-1 →

Naogaon-6 is a constituency represented in the Jatiya Sangsad (National Parliament) of Bangladesh since 2026 by Seikh Md. Rejaul Islam of the Bangladesh Nationalist Party.

== Boundaries ==
The constituency encompasses Atrai and Raninagar upazilas.

== History ==
The constituency was created in 1984 from the Rajshahi-9 constituency when the former Rajshahi District was split into four districts: Nawabganj, Naogaon, Rajshahi, and Natore.

== Members of Parliament ==
Election	Member	Party
1986	Ohidur Rahman	Independent (Note: Multiple sources state that Ohidur Rahman was elected as an independent candidate. The Bangladesh Parliament's list of members suggests that during his term he changed his party affiliation to the Communist Party of Bangladesh.)
1988	Mullah Rezaul Islam	Jatiya Party
1991	Alamgir Kabir	Bangladesh Nationalist Party
2008	Israfil Alam	Awami League
2020 by-election	Anwar Hossain Helal	Awami League
2026	Seikh Md. Rejaul Islam	Bangladesh Nationalist Party

== Elections ==
=== Elections in the 2010s ===
Israfil Alam was re-elected unopposed in the 2014 general election after opposition parties withdrew their candidacies in a boycott of the election.

=== Elections in the 2000s ===
General Election 2008: Naogaon-6
Party	Candidate	Votes	%	±%
AL	Israfil Alam	130,985	60.1	+16.2
BNP	Anwar Hossain Bulu	86,990	39.9	−14.9
Majority		43,995	20.2	+9.3
Turnout		217,975	91.5	+4.5
AL gain from BNP				

General Election 2001: Naogaon-6
Party	Candidate	Votes	%	±%
BNP	Alamgir Kabir	102,693	54.8	+3.3
AL	Israfil Alam	82,218	43.9	+6.6
IJOF	K. C. Mashiur Alam	2,086	1.1	N/A
CPB	Pradyut Fouzder	359	0.2	N/A
Majority		20,475	10.9	−3.3
Turnout		187,356	87.0	+1.8
BNP hold				

=== Elections in the 1990s ===
General Election June 1996: Naogaon-6
Party	Candidate	Votes	%	±%
BNP	Alamgir Kabir	77,304	51.5	+5.5
AL	Ohidur Rahman	56,053	37.3	N/A
JP(E)	Sree Bethindranath Shaha	8,467	5.6	+2.7
Jamaat	Md. Mofazzal Hossain	7,678	5.1	−9.9
BKA	M. Abdul Latif	311	0.2	N/A
Zaker Party	Md. Ataur Rahman	226	0.2	−0.2
Majority		21,251	14.2	+3.4
Turnout		150,039	85.2	+11.3
BNP hold				

General Election 1991: Naogaon-6
Party	Candidate	Votes	%	±%
BNP	Alamgir Kabir	61,183	46.0	
CPB	Ohidur Rahman	46,780	35.2	
Jamaat	Md. Mofazzal Hossain	19,911	15.0	
JP(E)	Mollah Rezaul Islam	3,791	2.9	
Independent	Chowdhury Motahar Hossain	540	0.4	
Zaker Party	Md. Nazrul Islam	525	0.4	
Jatiya Samajtantrik Dal-JSD	Md. Shahiur Rahman Kha	239	0.2	
Majority		14,403	10.8	
Turnout		132,969	73.9	
BNP gain from				
