= Shamsul Huda Chaudhury =

Bangladeshi politician

- শামসুল হুদা চেীধুরী

5th Speaker of the Jatiya Sangsad
- In office 10 July 1986 – 5 April 1991
- Deputy: Md Korban Ali; Md. Reazuddin Ahmed
- Preceded by: Mirza Ghulam Hafiz
- Succeeded by: Abdur Rahman Biswas

Minister of Education
- In office 4 August 1985 – 16 February 1986
- Prime Minister: Ataur Rahman Khan
- Preceded by: Himself
- Succeeded by: Mohammed Abdul Matin
- In office 1 June 1984 – 15 January 1985
- Prime Minister: Ataur Rahman Khan
- Preceded by: A. Majeed Khan
- Succeeded by: Himself

Minister of Religious Affairs
- In office 25 May 1986 – 9 July 1986
- Prime Minister: Ataur Rahman Khan
- Preceded by: Himself
- Succeeded by: Abdul Mannan
- In office 16 February 1986 – 23 March 1986
- Prime Minister: Ataur Rahman Khan
- Preceded by: A. K. M. Nurul Islam
- Succeeded by: Himself

Minister of Communications
- In office 12 February 1982 – 24 March 1982
- Prime Minister: Shah Azizur Rahman
- Preceded by: Abdul Alim
- Succeeded by: Mahbub Ali Khan

Minister of Information and Broadcasting
- In office 5 March 1982 – 24 March 1982
- Prime Minister: Shah Azizur Rahman
- Preceded by: Tafazzal Hossain Khan
- Succeeded by: A R Shamsud Doha (as advisor)
- In office 25 April 1980 – 27 November 1981
- Prime Minister: Shah Azizur Rahman
- Preceded by: Habib Ullah Khan
- Succeeded by: Tafazzal Hossain Khan
- In office 12 October 1977 – 4 July 1978
- Preceded by: Akbar Kabir
- Succeeded by: Habib Ullah Khan

Member of the Bangladesh Parliament for Mymensingh-5
- In office 7 May 1986 – 6 December 1990
- Preceded by: Khurram Khan Chowdhury
- Succeeded by: Keramat Ali Talukdar

Member of the Bangladesh Parliament for Mymensingh-8
- In office 18 February 1979 – 24 March 1982
- Preceded by: Md. Abdul Halim
- Succeeded by: Hashim Uddin Ahmed

Personal details
- Born: 1 May 1920 Birbhum, Bengal Presidency, British India
- Died: 15 February 2000 (aged 79) Dhaka, Bangladesh
- Party: Bangladesh Nationalist Party
- Spouse: Leila Arjumand Banu
- Education: Presidency College, Kolkata; Aligarh Muslim University

Shamsul Huda Chaudhury (1 May 1920 – 15 February 2000) was a Bangladeshi politician, mass-media administrator, minister, and two-time speaker of the Bangladesh Jatiya Sangsad.

== Early life ==
Chaudhury was born on 1 May 1920 in Sufi, Birbhum, West Bengal, British India. In 1941, he graduated with a B.A. from the Presidency College, Kolkata. He also got an M.A. and LL.B. degree from the Aligarh Muslim University. From 1943 to 1944, he was the vice president of Aligarh University Students Union. He was the president of the All Bengal Muslim Students League. He was a successful debater in his student life and won awards for his debate performances. In 1943, he was awarded the Sir Morris Goar Trophy in the All India Debate competition.

== Career ==
Chaudhury was the regional director of All India Radio, and after the Partition of India in 1948, he joined the Pakistan Radio. He was also the deputy director of the tourism department. He was the founder director of Pakistan International Airlines and the chief of public relations of East Pakistan Industrial Development Corporation.

In 1970, Chaudhury was the secretary-general, East Pakistan, of the Convention Muslim League (CML). He stood as a CML candidate in the 1970 Pakistani general election, and was elected member of the national assembly (MNA) for constituency Mymensingh-XI.

He served as the chairman of the Bangladesh Broadcasting Inquiry Commission in 1976. He was appointed advisor to the Information Ministry in 1977. Chaudhury was elected as a member of the parliament in 1979. He served as the minister of information, minister of youth and sports, minister of cultural affairs, minister of religious affairs, minister of railways, and minister of planning. He was elected a member of parliament for the second time in 1986 and became the speaker of the Jatiya Sangsad. He served a second term as speaker of the Jatiya Sangsad for the second time from 1986 to April 1991.

== Personal life ==
He was married to Leila Arjumand Banu (1929–1995), a music artiste and social worker.

== Death ==
Chaudhury died on 15 February 2000 and is buried in Dhaka beside his wife, Leila Arjumand Banu.
