= A. H. G. Mohiuddin =

Bangladeshi diplomat

- এ. এইচ. জি. মহিউদ্দিন

Permanent Representative of Bangladesh to the United Nations
- In office 16 Aug 1990 – 17 Dec 1990
- Preceded by: A. H. S. Ataul Karim
- Succeeded by: Mohammed Mohsin

Personal details
- Spouse: Mansura Mohiuddin
- Relatives: Rowshan Ershad (sister); Mamta Wahab (sister); Hussain Muhammad Ershad (brother-in-law); Mashiur Rahman (father-in-law); Shafiqul Ghani Swapan (brother-in-law)

A. H. G. Mohiuddin is a Bangladeshi businessman, diplomat, and a former Permanent Representative of Bangladesh to the United Nations served in 1990.

== Career ==
Mohiuddin headed the Consulate General of Bangladesh in Hong Kong from 1 August 1980 to 30 November 1982.

In 1987, Mohiuddin was the Deputy Permanent Representative of Bangladesh to the United Nations in New York City.

On 29 June 1990, Mohiuddin was appointed the Permanent Representative of Bangladesh to the United Nations.

Mohiuddin served as the Director of Economic Affairs at the Organization of Islamic Conferences.

Mohiuddin is the chairperson of the Board of Directors of Grameen Bitek. He is the representative of Al-Rajhi Company for Industry and Trade in the Board of Islami Bank Bangladesh Limited.

== Personal life ==
Mohiuddin is the brother in law of Hussain Muhammad Ershad, President of Bangladesh.

Mohiuddin was residing in Westchester County, New York while serving as the Deputy Permanent Representative of Bangladesh to the United Nations in New York City. His domestic maid, Amina, accused him and his wife of holding her prisoner in their home in Westchester County and beating her.
