= Barahit Union =

Barahit Union বড়হিত ইউনিয়ন
- Union
- Location within Bangladesh
- Coordinates: 24.6413°N 90.5807°E
- Country: Bangladesh
- Division: Mymensingh
- District: Mymensingh
- Upazila: Ishwarganj

Area
  - Land: 23.74 km^{2} (9.17 sq mi)

Population (2011)
  - Total: 29,350
  - Density: 1,236/km^{2} (3,202/sq mi)
- Time zone: UTC+6 (BST)
- Postal code: 2280
- Website: barahitup.mymensingh.gov.bd

Barahit Union (Bengali: বড়হিত ইউনিয়ন) is a union parishad under Ishwarganj Upazila of Mymensingh District in the division of Mymensingh, Bangladesh. It has an area of 23.74 square kilometres and a population of 28049.

== Geography ==
Barahit Union is bounded on the west by Tarundia and Uchakhila Unions, on the east by Maijbagh and Ishwarganj Unions, on the south by Magtula and Rajibpur Unions and on the north by Gauripur Upazila.

== Demographics ==
The total area of Barahit Union is 23.74 km^{2}. According to the Bangladesh National Portal, the total population living in the union in 2011 was 29,350.
