= Luthfullahel Mazed =

Bangladeshi politician

- লুৎফুল্লাহেল মাজেদ
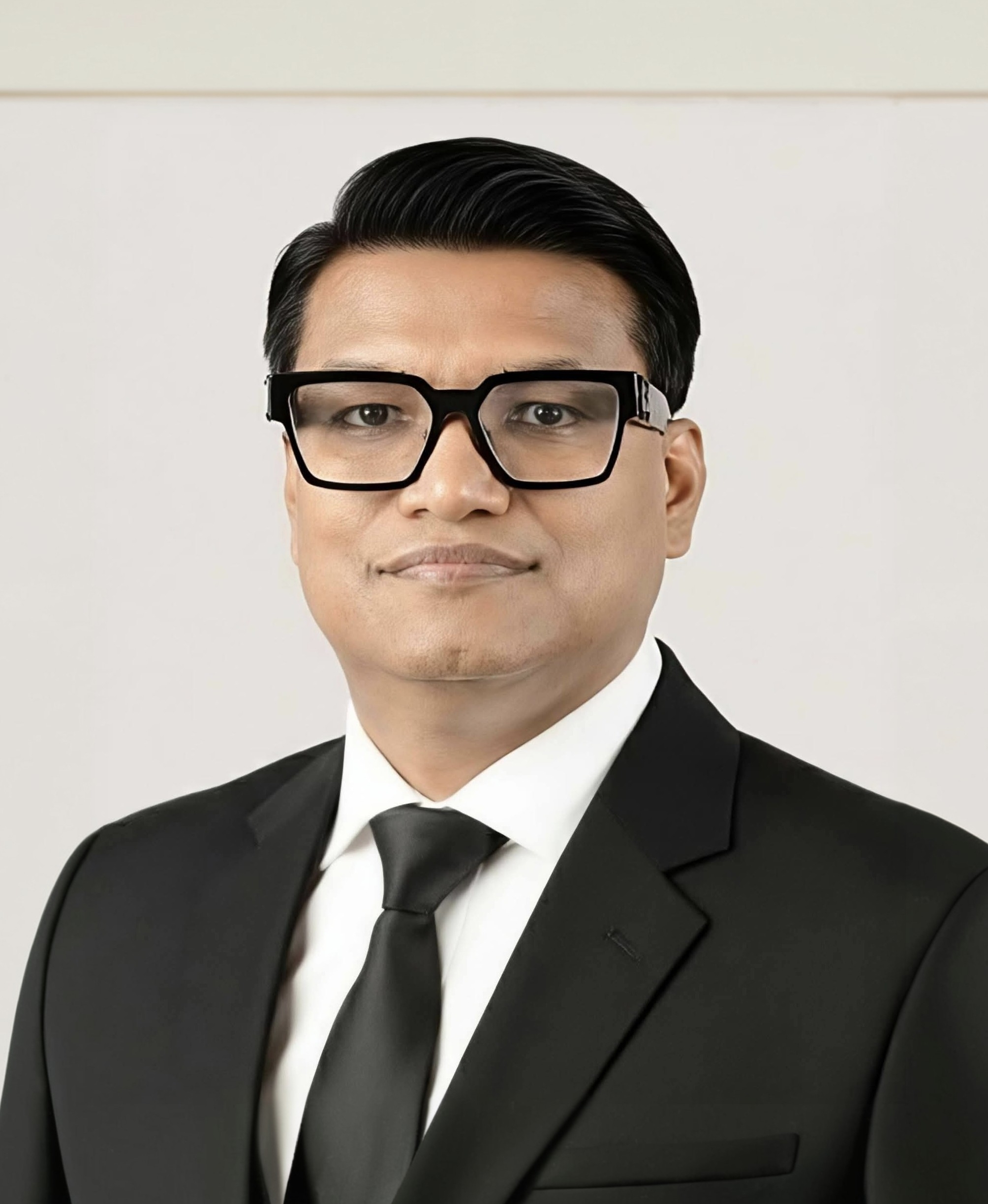

Member of the Bangladesh Parliament for Mymensingh-8
- Incumbent
- Assumed office 17 February 2026
- Preceded by: Mahmud Hasan Sumon
- Constituency: Mymensingh-8

Personal details
- Born: 24 September 1978 (age 47)
- Party: Bangladesh Nationalist Party
- Profession: Engineer, businessperson

Luthfullahel Mazed is a Bangladeshi businessman, owner of Aeroness International Ltd, and a politician of the Bangladesh Nationalist Party. He is currently serving as a member of parliament from Mymensingh-8.

== Early life and education ==
Mazed was born on 24 September 1978 in the village of Narayanpur located within Ishwarganj Upazila in the Mymensingh District. He completed his higher education earning a Master of Business Administration (MBA) degree. He is married to Farhana Rifat.
