= K. M. Khalid =

Bangladeshi politician

- কে এম খালিদ
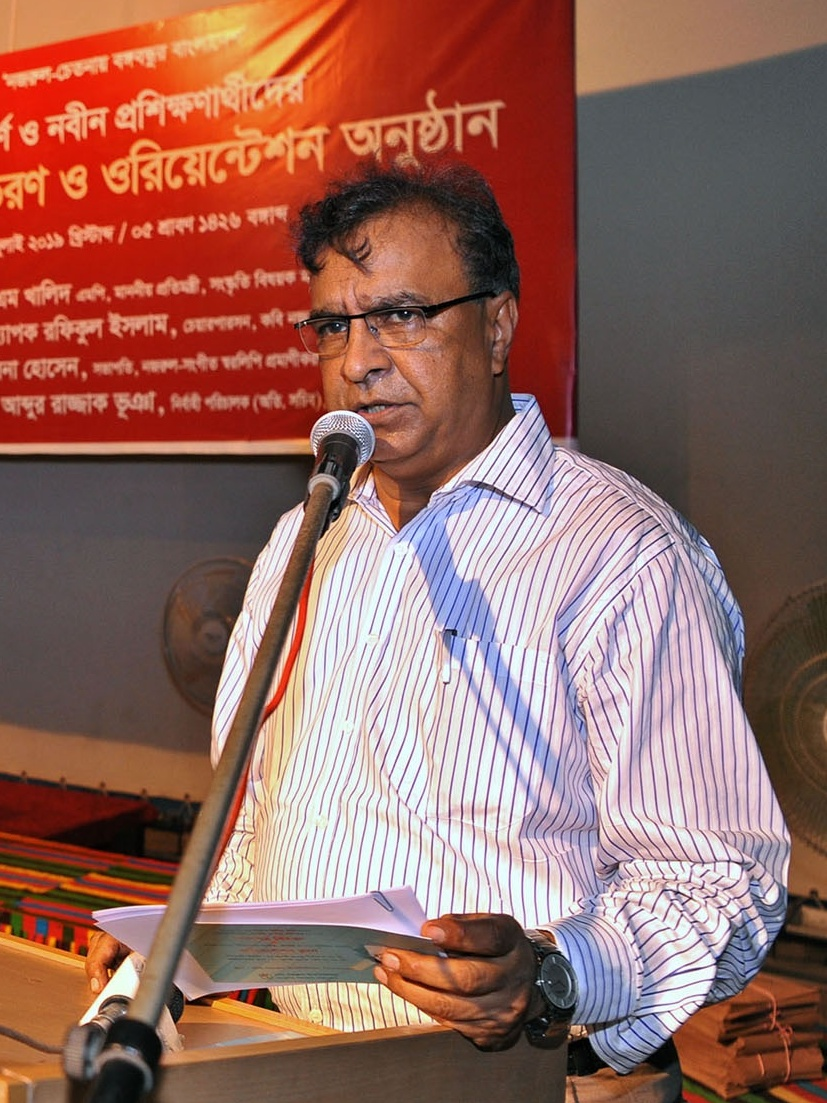
- Khalid in 2019

Minister of State for Cultural Affairs
- In office 7 January 2019 – 7 January 2024
- Prime Minister: Sheikh Hasina
- Preceded by: Asaduzzaman Noor
- Succeeded by: Ali Newaz Mahmud Khaiyam

Member of Parliament
- In office 7 January 2019 – 7 January 2024
- Preceded by: Salahuddin Ahmed Mukti
- Constituency: Mymensingh-5
- In office 25 January 2009 – 24 January 2014
- Preceded by: A. K. M. Mosharraf Hossain
- Constituency: Mymensingh-5

Personal details
- Born: 4 August 1955 (age 70)
- Party: Bangladesh Awami League
- Relatives: M Hamid (brother); Mahmud Sajjad (brother)

K. M. Khalid (born 4 August 1955) is a Bangladesh Awami League politician and former state minister of cultural affairs. He is former Jatiya Sangsad member from the Mymensingh-5 constituency.

== Personal life ==
Among Khalid's five brothers, M Hamid is the former director-general of Bangladesh Television and Mahmud Sajjad (d. 2021) was an actor.
