= Anwar Hossain Helal =

Bangladeshi politician

Anowar Hossain Helal
- আনোয়ার হোসেন হেলাল

Member of the Bangladesh Parliament for Naogaon-6
- In office 28 October 2020 – 7 January 2024
- Preceded by: Israfil Alam
- Succeeded by: Md. Omar Faruk

Personal details
- Born: 12 July 1964 (age 62) Naogaon
- Party: Bangladesh Awami League
- Children: 2 sons and one daughter
- Nickname: Helal

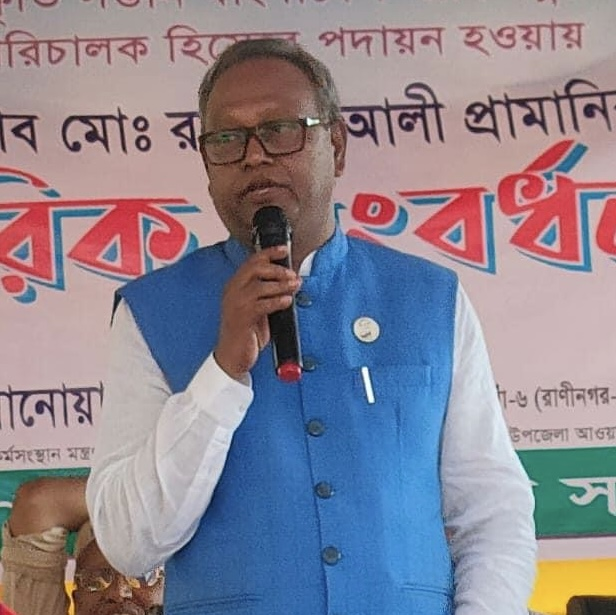
Anwar Hossain Helal.

Anwar Hossain Helal is a politician from Naogaon District of Bangladesh. He was elected a member of parliament from Naogaon-6 in an October 2020 by-election.

== Biography ==
Anowar Hossain Helal was born on 12 July 1964 in Raninagar, Naogaon. His father is Azim Uddin Sardar. On 19 June 2000, Helal's younger brother Nazrul Islam Naju, then president of Raninagar Upazila Chhatra League, was brutally slaughtered by the proletariat.

In 2003, Helal was elected chairman of Khatteshwar Raninagar Union. He was the chairman of the Raninagar Upazila Parishad for 2009–2014 and 2019–2020. He has been the vice president of the upazila Awami League since 2014.

Israfil Alam, member of parliament for Naogaon-6, died on 27 July 2020. The Awami League nominated Helal to replace him. Helal was elected in a by-election on 17 October 2020. He bagged 105,467 votes, while BNP candidate Sheikh Rezaul Islam got 4,517 votes. Helal was sworn in on 28 October 2020.
