= Kanchamatia River =

River in Bangladesh

Coordinates: 24.6661°N 90.5546°E

The Kanchamatia River (Bengali: কাঁচামাটিয়া নদী) is a river in Ishwarganj and Nandail upazilas of Mymensingh district in northeastern Bangladesh. The length of the river is 50 km (31 mi), the average width is 116 m (381 ft) and the nature of the river is serpentine. It is a tributary of the Old Brahmaputra Rivar and is the only river passing through these upazilas.
