= Atharabari Union =

Atharabari Union আঠারবাড়ী ইউনিয়ন
- Union
- Location within Bangladesh
- Coordinates: 24.6445°N 90.7199°E
- Country: Bangladesh
- Division: Mymensingh
- District: Mymensingh
- Upazila: Ishwarganj

Area
  - Land: 20.197 km^{2} (7.798 sq mi)

Population (2011)
  - Total: 30,322
  - Density: 1,501.3/km^{2} (3,888.4/sq mi)
- Time zone: UTC+6 (BST)
- Postal code: 2280
- Website: official website

Atharabari Union (Bengali: আঠারবাড়ী ইউনিয়ন) is a union parishad under Ishwarganj Upazila of Mymensingh District in Mymensingh Division, Bangladesh. It has an area of 20.197 square kilometres and a population of 30,322.

== Demographics ==
The total area of Atharbari Union is 5463 acres. According to the National Bureau of Statistics of Bangladesh census report, the total population of the union in 2001 was 30,322, of which the number of men and women was 15,475 and 14,847 respectively.
