= Alamgir Kabir (politician) =

Bangladeshi politician

- আলমগীর কবির

State Minister of Women and Children Affairs
- In office 16 May 2006 – 29 October 2006

State Minister of Housing and Public Works
- In office 11 October 2001 – 16 May 2006

Member of the Bangladesh Parliament for Naogaon-6
- In office 5 March 1991 – 27 October 2006
- Preceded by: Mullah Rezaul Islam
- Succeeded by: Israfil Alam

Personal details
- Born: 1 January 1948 (age 78)
- Party: Bangladesh Nationalist Party
- Relatives: Anowar Hossain Bulu (brother)

Alamgir Kabir (born 1 January 1948) is a Bangladesh Nationalist Party politician and a former Jatiya Sangsad member representing the Naogaon-6 constituency. He also served as the state minister of Housing and Public Works and Women and Children Affairs.

== Background ==
Alamgir Kabir's brother, Anowar Hossain Bulu, is a politician and a former member of Bangladesh Nationalist Party (BNP).

== Career ==
Kabir was elected to parliament from Naogaon-6 as a BNP candidate in 1991, February 1996, June 1996, and 2001. In 2007, he was sued for patronizing Jamaat-ul-Mujahideen Bangladesh, an Islamist terror organisation. He was nominated by the BNP to contest the 11th Jatiya Sangshad elections from Naogaon.

In March 2014, ACC sued Kabir for corruption charges.
