= A. K. M. Mosharraf Hossain =

Bangladeshi politician (died 2020)

- এ. কে. এম. মোশাররফ হোসেন

State Minister of Energy and Mineral Resources
- In office 10 October 2001 – 18 June 2005

Member of the Bangladesh Parliament for Mymensingh-5
- In office 14 July 1996 – 27 October 2006
- Preceded by: Abu Reza Fazlul Haque Bablu
- Succeeded by: K. M. Khalid

Personal details
- Born: 1936/37
- Died: 17 October 2020 (aged 83) Dhaka, Bangladesh
- Party: Bangladesh Nationalist Party
- Spouse: Zeenat Mosharraf
- Relations: Mohammed Zakir Hossain (brother)

A. K. M. Mosharraf Hossain (1936/37 – 17 October 2020) was a politician of the Bangladesh Nationalist Party and a state minister of energy and mineral resources from 10 October 2001 until his resignation on 18 June 2005. He was a 2-term Jatiya Sangsad member representing the Mymensingh-5 constituency.

== Career ==
Hossain served as a bureaucrat in the administration of President Hussain Muhammad Ershad. He was elected to the parliament from Mymensingh-5 in 1996 and 2001 as a candidate of the Bangladesh Nationalist Party. He served as the state minister of energy and mineral resources in the Third Khaleda Cabinet from October 2001 to June 2005. He was removed from office on allegations of corruption regarding Niko Resources.

Hossain was nominated by the BNP for the Mymensingh-4 constituency in the 2008 Bangladeshi general election but he failed to win the election.

=== Corruption charges ===
Hossain received a Toyota Land Cruiser, worth 9.5 million taka, from Canadian petroleum company Niko Resources as a bribe for a contract in the Tengratila and Feni gas fields. On 12 February 2012, Hossain was sued by the Bangladesh Anti Corruption Commission for corruption. Niko sued Bangladesh in 2010 at the International Centre for Settlement of Investment Disputes of the World Bank.

== Personal life ==
Hossain was married to Zeenat Mosharraf, a former Jatiya Sangsad member of the Jatiya Party.

Hossain died on 17 October 2020 at a hospital in Dhaka. He was infected with the COVID-19 virus.
