= Salahuddin Ahmed Mukti =

Bangladeshi politician

Member of Parliament

Personal details
- Party: Jatiya Party

Salahuddin Ahmed Mukti (Bengali: সালাহউদ্দিন আহমেদ (মুক্তি)) is a Bangladeshi politician. He was the member of Bangladesh Parliament from Mymensingh-5 during 2014 to 2019.

== Early life ==
Mukti was born on 2 January 1973. He has a S.S.C. degree.

== Career ==
Mukti was elected to Parliament from Mymensingh-5 as a Jatiya Party candidate in 2014.
