= Permanent Representative of Bangladesh to the United Nations =

- Government Seal of Bangladesh

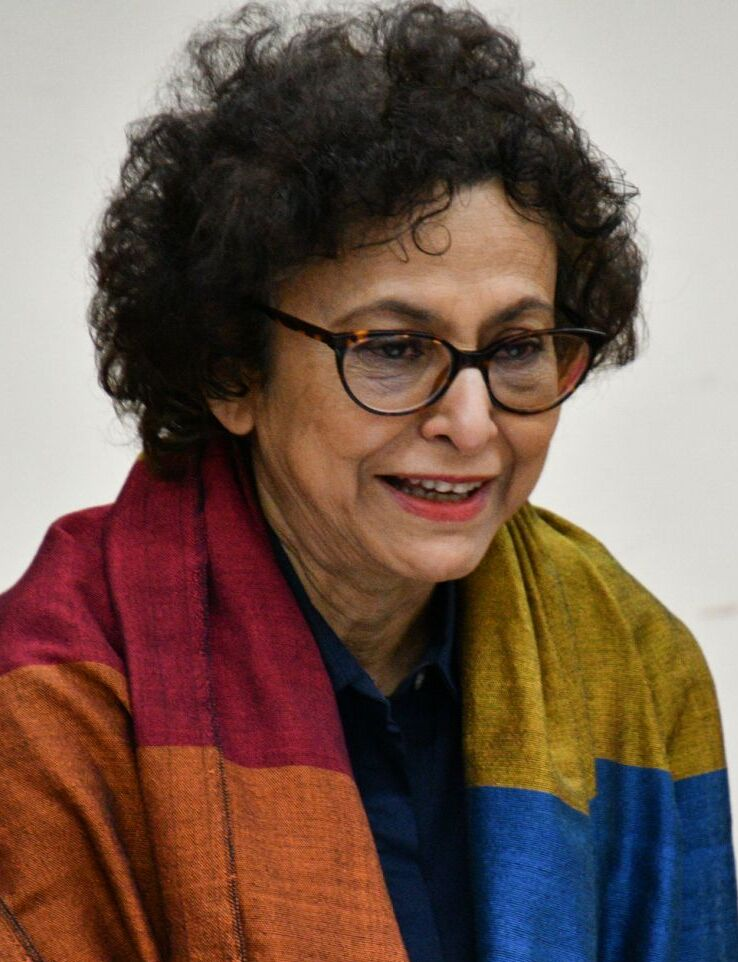
- Incumbent; Irene Khan since 29 August 2026
- Style: His/Her Excellency
- Appointer: President of Bangladesh
- Formation: 1972
- Website: Permanent Representative of Bangladesh to the United Nations

The Permanent Representative of Bangladesh to the United Nations is the head of the Permanent Mission of Bangladesh to the United Nations. The Permanent Representative of Bangladesh to the United Nations is the foremost representative of Bangladesh to the United Nations and holds of the rank of ambassador and sometimes as a state minister.

== Permanent representatives to the United Nations ==
- 1974-1976: Syed Anwarul Karim
- 1976-1982: Khwaja Mohammed Kaiser
- 1982-1986: Khwaja Wasiuddin
- 1986-1988: B. A. Siddiqi
- 1988-1990: A. H. S. Ataul Karim
- 1990-1991: A. H. G. Mohiuddin
- 1991-1991: Mohammed Mohsin
- 1991-1994: M. Humayun Kabir
- 1994-1996: Reaz Rahman
- 1996-2001: Anwarul Karim Chowdhury
- 2001-2007: Iftekhar Ahmed Chowdhury
- 2007-2009: Ismat Jahan
- 2009-2015: Abulkalam Abdul Momen
- 2015–2019: Masud Bin Momen
- 2019-2022: Rabab Fatima
- 2022–2024: Muhammad Abdul Muhith
- 2024–2026: Salahuddin Noman Chowdhury
- 2026–present: Irene Khan
