= Rajibpur Union =

Rajibpur Union রাজীবপুর ইউনিয়ন
- Union
- Location within Bangladesh
- Coordinates: 24.6004°N 90.5473°E
- Country: Bangladesh
- Division: Mymensingh
- District: Mymensingh
- Upazila: Ishwarganj

Area
  - Land: 32.11 km^{2} (12.40 sq mi)

Population (2011)
  - Total: 42!208
  - Density: 1.3/km^{2} (3.4/sq mi)
- Time zone: UTC+6 (BST)
- Postal code: 2280
- Website: official website

Rajibpur Union (Bengali: রাজীবপুর ইউনিয়ন) is a union parishad under Ishwarganj Upazila of Mymensingh District in the division of Mymensingh, Bangladesh. It has an area of 32.107 square kilometres and a population of 42,028.

== Geography ==
The Union is bounded on the east by Trishal Upazila, on the south by Nandail Upazila, on the west by Magtula Union and on the north by Uchakhila and Barahit Unions.

== Demographics ==
According to the census report of the National Bureau of Statistics of Bangladesh, the number of males and females in the union in 2001 was 16,933 and 12,617 respectively.

== Education ==
Rajibpur Aftab Uddin High School is the only secondary school in the union.
