= Mymensingh-4 =

Constituency of Bangladesh's Jatiya Sangsad

Coordinates: 24.76°N 90.40°E

- Constituency for the Jatiya Sangsad
- District: Mymensingh District
- Division: Mymensingh Division
- Electorate: 650,289 (2023)

Current constituency
- Created: 1973
- Party: Bangladesh Nationalist Party
- Member: Md. Abu Wahab Akanda Wahid
- ← 148 Mymensingh-3 150 Mymensingh-5 →

Mymensingh-4 is a constituency represented in the Jatiya Sangsad (National Parliament) of Bangladesh since 2026 by Md. Abu Wahab Akanda Wahid of the Bangladesh Nationalist Party.

== Boundaries ==
The constituency encompasses Mymensingh Sadar Upazila.

== History ==
The constituency was created for the first general elections in newly independent Bangladesh, held in 1973.

Ahead of the 2008 general election, the Election Commission redrew constituency boundaries to reflect population changes revealed by the 2001 Bangladesh census. The 2008 redistricting altered the boundaries of the constituency.

Ahead of the 2014 general election, the Election Commission expanded the boundaries of the constituency to include all Mymensingh Sadar Upazila. Previously the constituency had excluded five union parishads: Borar Char, Char Ishwardia, Char Nilashmia, Paranganj, and Sirta.

== Members of Parliament ==
Election	Member	Party
1973	Abdul Malek	Awami League
1979	Zainul Abedin	Bangladesh Nationalist Party
1986	Motiur Rahman	Awami League
1988	Begum Mamta Wahab	Jatiya Party
1991	AKM Fazlul Haque	Bangladesh Nationalist Party
Jun 1996	Rowshan Ershad	Jatiya Party
2001	Delwar Hossain Khan Dulu	Bangladesh Nationalist Party
2008	Motiur Rahman	Awami League
2014	Rowshan Ershad	Jatiya Party
2024	Mohit Ur Rahman Shanto	Awami League
2026	Md. Abu Wahab Akanda Wahid	Bangladesh Nationalist Party

== Elections ==
=== Elections in the 2020s ===
General election 2026: Mymensingh-4
Party	Candidate	Votes	%	±%
BNP	Md. Abu Wahab Akanda Wahid			
Jamaat	Md Kamrul Ahsan			
BSD (Marxist)	Sekhar Kumar Roy			
IAB	Md Nasir Uddin			
JP(E)	Abu Md Musa Sarkar			
Majority				
Turnout				

=== Elections in the 2010s ===
Rowshan Ershad was elected unopposed in the 2014 general election after opposition parties withdrew their candidacies in a boycott of the election.

=== Elections in the 2000s ===
General Election 2008: Mymensingh-4
Party	Candidate	Votes	%	±%
AL	Motiur Rahman	172,239	65.3	+34.0
BNP	A. K. M. Mosharraf Hossain	85,760	32.5	−5.8
IAB	Md. Musharaf Husen	2,161	0.8	N/A
JP(E)	Rowshan Ershad	1,653	0.6	N/A
BKA	Abdul Aziz	634	0.2	N/A
BSD	Abu Naem Md. Khairul Bashar	538	0.2	N/A
JSD	Choudhuri Muhammad Ishak	407	0.2	N/A
Bangladesh Kalyan Party	Shahid Amini Rumi	184	0.1	N/A
BIF	Md. Saydur Rahman	110	0.0	N/A
Majority		86,479	32.8	+25.8
Turnout		263,686	79.0	+9.7
AL gain from BNP				

General Election 2001: Mymensingh-4
Party	Candidate	Votes	%	±%
BNP	Delwar Hossain Khan Dulu	102,016	38.3	+10.1
AL	Motiur Rahman	83,380	31.3	+0.1
IJOF	Rowshan Ershad	49,278	18.5	N/A
Independent	Amir Ahmed Chowdhury Ratan	28,893	10.9	N/A
CPB	Shah Asaduzzaman	551	0.2	N/A
KSJL	Md. Kamruzzaman	526	0.2	N/A
Independent	A. B. M. Ayub	416	0.2	N/A
Jatiya Party (M)	Anil Bandhu Das	367	0.1	N/A
Bangladesh Samajtantrik Dal (Basad-Khalekuzzaman)	Sheikh Md. Siddiqur Rahman	231	0.1	N/A
Independent	Md. Kawser Hossain Haroon	166	0.1	N/A
Independent	Nasrin Monem Khan	124	0.0	N/A
Independent	A. H. Golam Mohiuddin	111	0.0	N/A
Bangladesh Krisak Sramik Mukti Andolon (Sadeq)	Krishak Md. Sadek	47	0.0	N/A
Majority		18,636	7.0	+1.8
Turnout		266,106	69.3	+3.8
BNP gain from JP(E)				

=== Elections in the 1990s ===
General Election June 1996: Mymensingh-4
Party	Candidate	Votes	%	±%
JP(E)	Rowshan Ershad	72,130	36.4	+14.9
AL	Amir Ahmed Chowdhury Ratan	61,831	31.2	+7.3
BNP	AKM Fazlul Haque	55,838	28.2	−7.0
Jamaat	Md. Golam Rabbani	4,203	2.1	N/A
IOJ	Md. Qazi Nurul Islam	2,117	1.1	N/A
Bangladesh Samajtantrik Dal (Khalekuzzaman)	Md. Obaidullah	689	0.3	N/A
Zaker Party	H. E. F. Afzal Ali	273	0.1	−0.1
Independent	Md. Habibul Islam	256	0.1	N/A
Gano Forum	Md. Adul Hasnat	233	0.1	N/A
Independent	Md. Abdus Sattar Fakir	177	0.1	N/A
NAP	Md. Amir Hossain	173	0.1	N/A
Majority		10,299	5.2	−6.1
Turnout		197,920	65.5	+17.0
JP(E) gain from BNP				

General Election 1991: Mymensingh-4
Party	Candidate	Votes	%	±%
BNP	AKM Fazlul Haque	44,842	35.2	
AL	Motiur Rahman	30,454	23.9	
JP(E)	Anil Bandhu Das	27,412	21.5	
BAKSAL	Zalil	14,285	11.2	
Bangladesh Muslim League (Kader)	Md. A. Hannan	5,108	4.0	
Bangladesh Janata Party	Md. Ali Ashraf Dulal	2,241	1.8	
Independent	Md. Rezaul Haq	1,129	0.9	
BKA	Abdul Aziz	756	0.6	
Jatiya Samajtantrik Dal-JSD	Md. A Hai Miah	301	0.2	
Jatiya Biplobi Front	Abdul Muttaleb Lal	291	0.2	
Jatiyatabadi Gonotantrik Chashi Dal	Raihana Khan	271	0.2	
Zaker Party	H. M. Afzal Ali	226	0.2	
Majority		14,388	11.3	
Turnout		127,316	48.5	
BNP gain from				
