= Abdus Sattar (Mymensingh politician) =

Bangladeshi politician

Md. Abdus Sattar

Personal details
- Party: Bangladesh Awami League

Md. Abdus Sattar is a Bangladesh Awami League politician and Member of Parliament. He is currently serving as a secretary of trade in Bangladesh Awami League.

== Early life ==
Sattar was born on 21 February 1952 in Ishwarganj Upazila, Mymensingh District, East Bengal, Pakistan.

He passed his matriculation from Ishwarganj Bisweswari Pilot High School.

== Career ==
Sattar worked as an importer. He was elected to the 9th Parliament of Bangladesh in 2009 from the Mymensingh-8 constituency. He served as the chairman of the Parliamentary Standing Committee on Ministry of Post and Telecommunication. He was a member of the Parliamentary Standing Committee on Ministry of Labour and Employment and Parliamentary Standing Committee on Ministry of Housing and Public Works.
