= Atrai Upazila =

Atrai Upazila আত্রাই উপজেলা
- Upazila
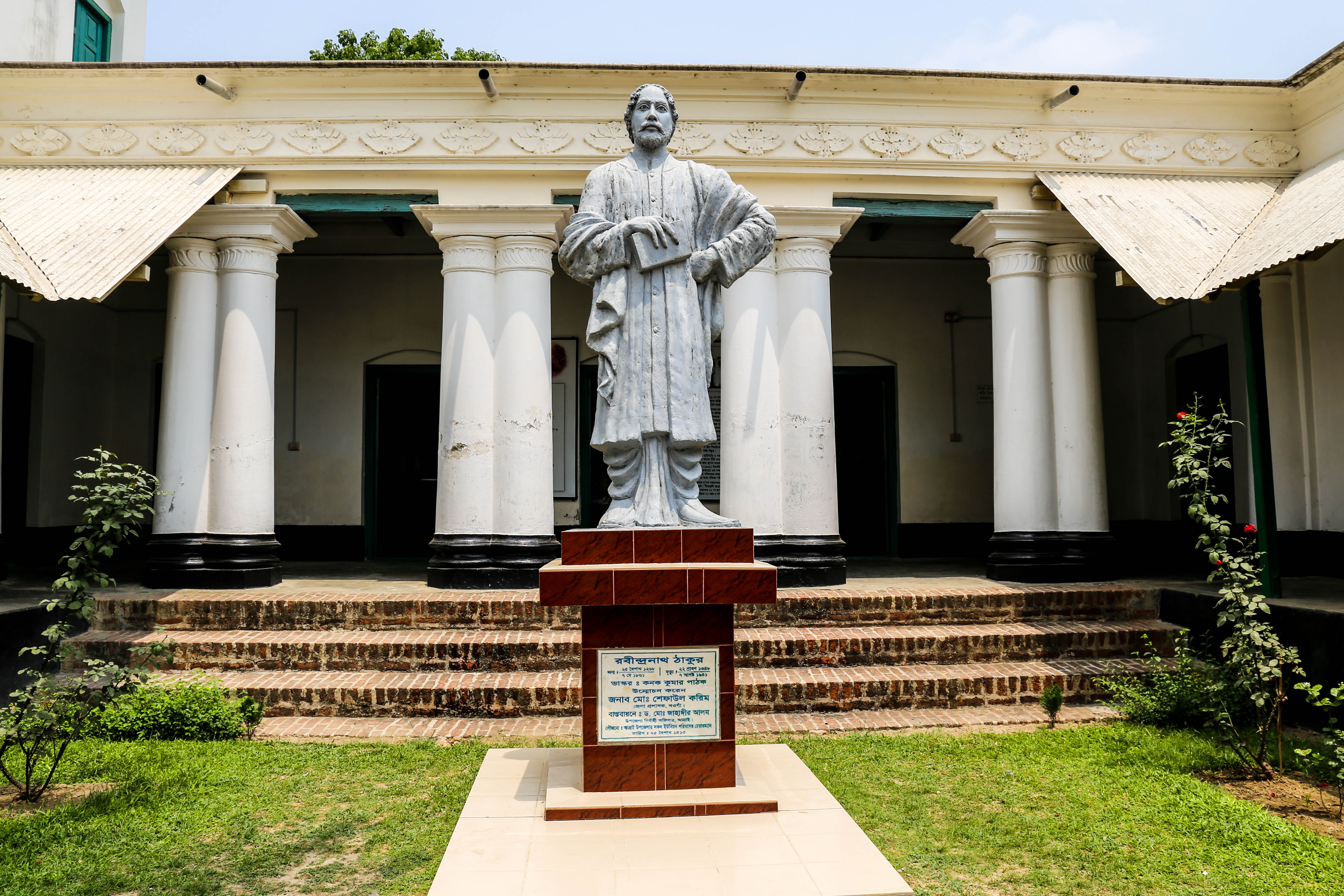
- Rabindra Katchibari at Patisar

- Coordinates: 24°36.8′N 88°58.2′E
- Country: Bangladesh
- Division: Rajshahi
- District: Naogaon

Government
  - Upazila Chairman: Ibadur Rahman Pramanik
  - MP (Naogaon-6): Anwar Hossain Helal

Area
  - Total: 284.40 km^{2} (109.81 sq mi)

Population (2022)
  - Total: 201,459
  - Density: 708.36/km^{2} (1,834.7/sq mi)
- Time zone: UTC+6 (BST)
- Postal code: 6596
- Website: Official website (in Bengali)

Atrai Pastoral Greenery (আত্রাই, পল্লী-প্রকৃতির এক শ্যামলিমা)

Atrai Upazila mauza geocode map

Atrai Upazila (Bengali: আত্রাই উপজেলা) is the southernmost upazila of Naogaon District, located in Bangladesh's Rajshahi Division. It is named after its principal watercourse, the Atrai River.

== Geography ==
Map of Naogaon District

Atrai has 45,465 households and total area 284.40 km^{2}. Along with the Atrai River, the Nagor River, Pakar Beel, Chander Beel, Kaklaban Beel are notable water bodies.

The upazila is bounded by Raninagar and Manda upazilas on the north, Natore sadar upazila on the south, Singra upazila on the east, Bagmara upazila on the west.

== History ==
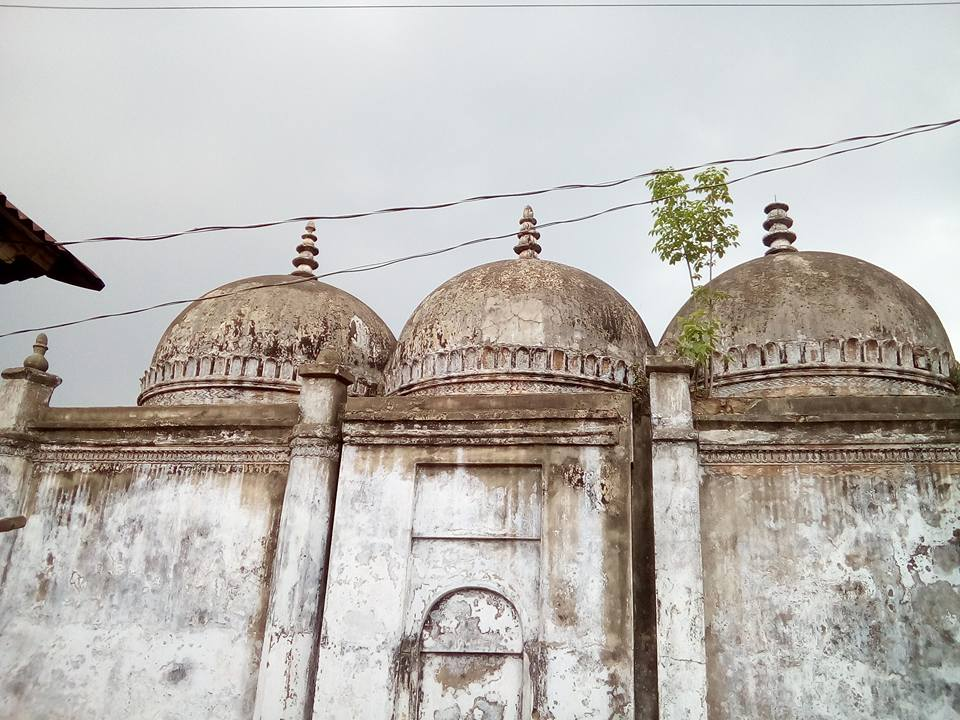
The medieval three-domed Islamganthi Mosque.

It is said that Islam Khan I, a Mughal Subahdar of Bengal, passed through Atrai (hence many villages have names such as Islampur and Islamganthi) and constructed a mosque known as the Islamganthi Mosque in the seventeenth century. Atrai later came under the zamindari of the Mollah political family.

In 1916, Atrai was officially established as a thana. In 1968, the Mollah Azad Memorial College was founded in Atrai. During the Bangladesh Liberation War of 1971, a brawl emerged between the two factions in Bandaikhara on 19 September. Another encounter took place near Ghaulya and Taranagar. In a surprise attack, nine Pakistan Army ships were sunk. Its status was upgraded to upazila (sub-district) in August 1983 as part of the President of Bangladesh Hussain Muhammad Ershad's decentralisation programme.

== Demographics ==
Religions in Atrai Upazila (2022)
| Religion | Percent |
| Islam | 91.18% |
| Hinduism | 8.79% |
| Other or not stated | 0.03% |

According to the 2022 Bangladeshi census, Atrai Upazila had 55,930 households and a population of 201,459. 7.89% of the population were under 5 years of age. Atrai had a literacy rate (age 7 and over) of 67.47%: 70.74% for males and 64.46% for females, and a sex ratio of 93.13 males for every 100 females. 22,447 (11.14%) lived in urban areas.

According to the 2011 Census of Bangladesh, Atrai Upazila had 45,465 households and a population of 193,256. 38,390 (19.86%) were under 10 years of age. Atrai had a literacy rate (age 7 and over) of 45.38%, compared to the national average of 51.8%, and a sex ratio of 1010 females per 1000 males. 13,202 (6.83%) lived in urban areas.

As of the 1991 Bangladesh census, Atrai has a population of 166978. Males constitute 50.88% of the population, and females 49.12%. The population above the age of eighteen years is 83466.

== Administration ==
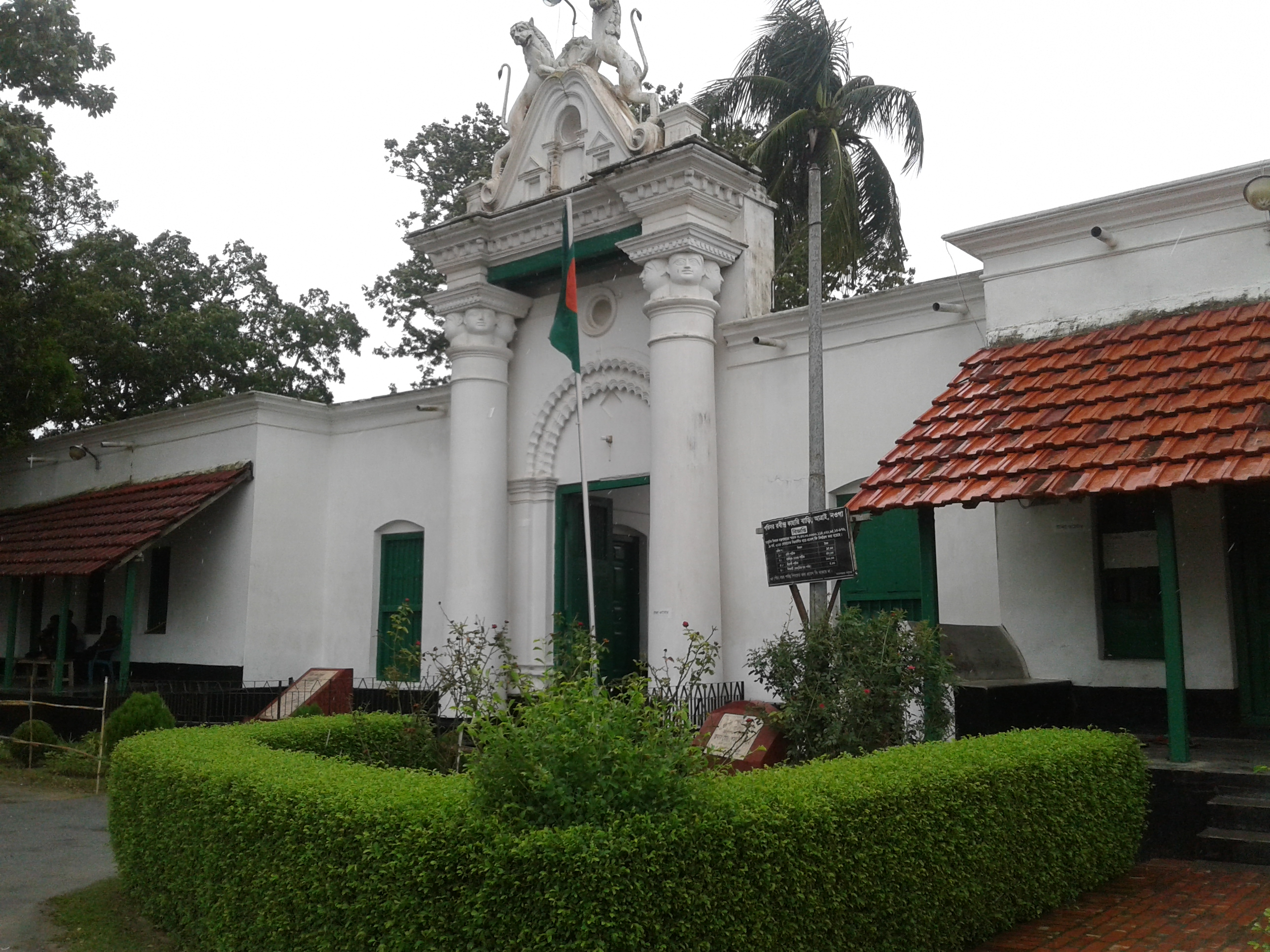
Rabindranath Tagore's home in Patisar, Atrai.

Atrai Upazila is divided into eight union parishads: Ashanganj, Bhonpara, Bisha, Hatkalupara, Kalikapur, Maniari, Panchupur, and Sahagola. The union parishads are subdivided into 155 mauzas and 200 villages.

Atrai Thana was formed in 1916 and it was turned into an upazila on 1 August 1983.

=== Chairmen ===
List of chairmen
| Name | Notes |
|---|---|
Bithindra Nath Saha
Ohidur Rahman
| Muhammad Ibadur Rahman Pramanik | Present |

== Facilities ==
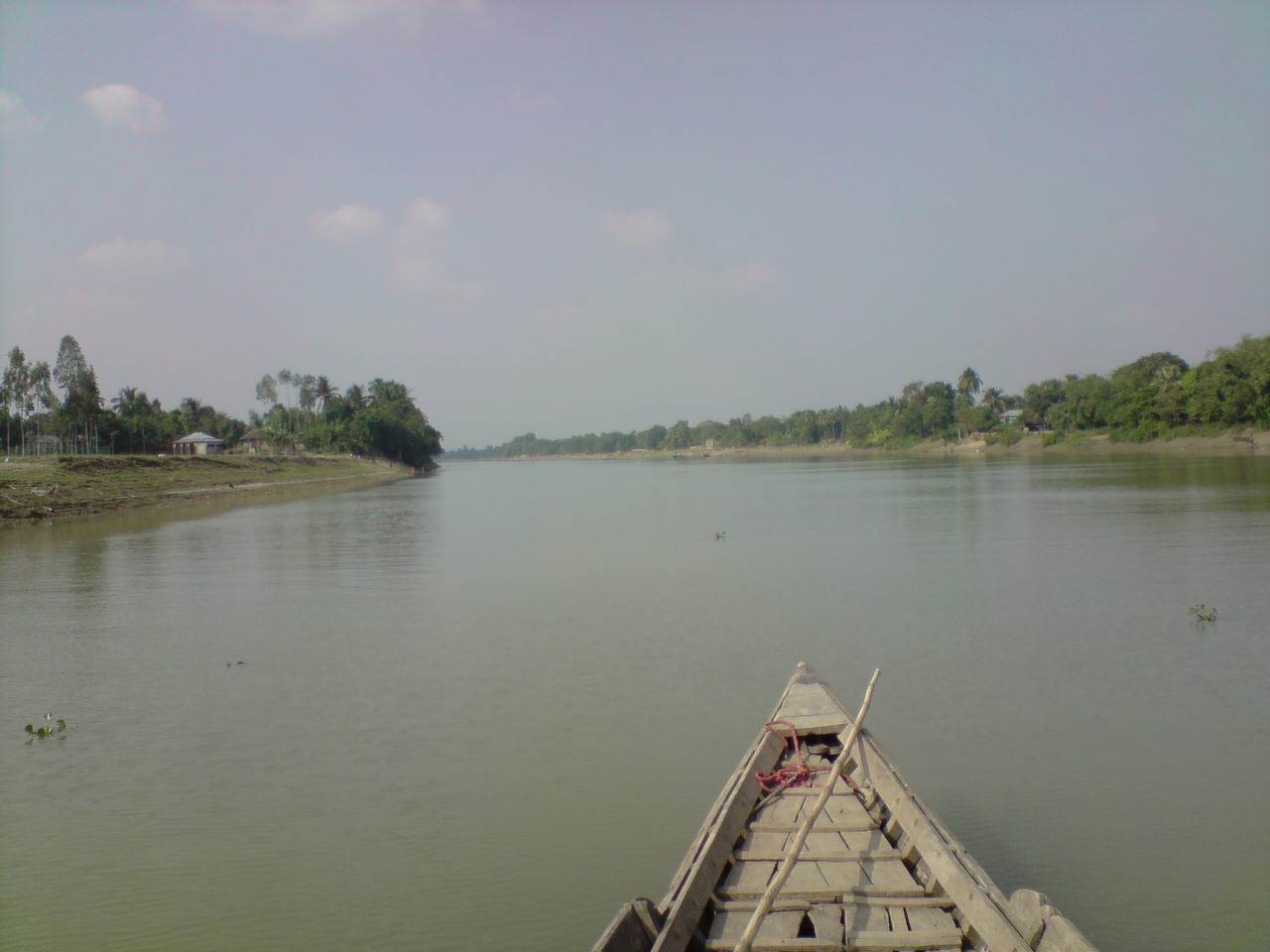
View of Atrai River from Samaspara neighbourhood.

Atrai Upazila has hundreds of mosques. Many of the mosques are notable tourist attractions in Atrai due to their antiquity or architectural style. These include the Islamganthi Mosque, Mahadighi Mosque, Qazipara Mosque and Mirpur Mosque. The mazar (mausoleum) of Naib Ali the Dervish is situated in Sannyasbari.

The upazila is home to other facilities such as the Madinatul Uloom Madrasa and Lillah Boarding Orphanage in Biharipur and the Bandaikhara Madhyapara Islamia Hafizia Madrasa and Orphanage Lillah Boarding.

== Notable people ==
- Moslem Ali Mollah, politician and businessman
- Ohidur Rahman, politician
- Rabindranath Tagore, poet and Nobel laureate who had lived here

== See also ==
- Upazilas of Bangladesh
- Districts of Bangladesh
- Divisions of Bangladesh
