= Delwar Hossain Khan Dulu =

Bangladeshi politician

Member of Bangladesh Parliament

Personal details
- Political party: Bangladesh Nationalist Party

Delwar Hossain Khan Dulu is a Bangladesh Nationalist Party politician and a former member of parliament for Mymensingh-4.

== Career ==
Dulu was elected to parliament from Mymensingh-4 as a Bangladesh Nationalist Party candidate in 2001.
