= AKM Fazlul Haque (Bangladesh Nationalist Party politician) =

Bangladeshi politician

Member of Bangladesh Parliament

Personal details
- Party: Bangladesh Nationalist Party

AKM Fazlul Haque is a Bangladesh Nationalist Party politician and a former member of parliament for Mymensingh-6 and Mymensingh-4.

== Career ==
Fazlul Haque was elected to parliament from Mymensingh-6 as a Bangladesh Nationalist Party candidate in 1979. He was elected to parliament from Mymensingh-4 as a Bangladesh Nationalist Party candidate in 1991.
