= Ishwarganj =

Ishwarganj ঈশ্বরগঞ্জ
- Town and Municipality
- Location of Ishwarganj town Ishwarganj (Bangladesh)
- Coordinates: 24.688°N 90.595°E
- Country: Bangladesh
- Division: Mymensingh Division
- District: Mymensingh District
- Upazila: Ishwarganj Upazila

Government
  - Type: Municipality
  - Body: Ishwarganj Municipality
  - Paura Mayor: Abdus Sattar

Population (2022)
  - Total: 33,632
  - Ethnicities: Bengali
- Time zone: UTC+6 (BST)
- postal code: 2280, Mymensingh
- National calling code: +880

Ishwarganj Municipality mahallah geocode map

Ishwarganj is a town and municipality in Mymensingh District in the division of Mymensingh. It is the administrative centre and urban centre of Ishwarganj Upazila.

== Demographics ==
Religions in Ishwarganj (2011)
Religion	Percent
Islam	91.47%
Hinduism	8.53%

According to the 2022 Bangladesh census, Ishwarganj city had a population of 33,632 and a literacy rate of 77.50%.

According to the 2011 Bangladesh census, Ishwarganj city had 5,917 households and a population of 28,631. 7,007 (24.47%) were under 10 years of age. Ishwarganj had a literacy rate (age 7 and over) of 58.00%, compared to the national average of 51.8%, and a sex ratio of 962 females per 1000 males.
