= Raninagar Upazila =

Raninagar Upazila রাণীনগর উপজেলা
- Upazila of Bangladesh
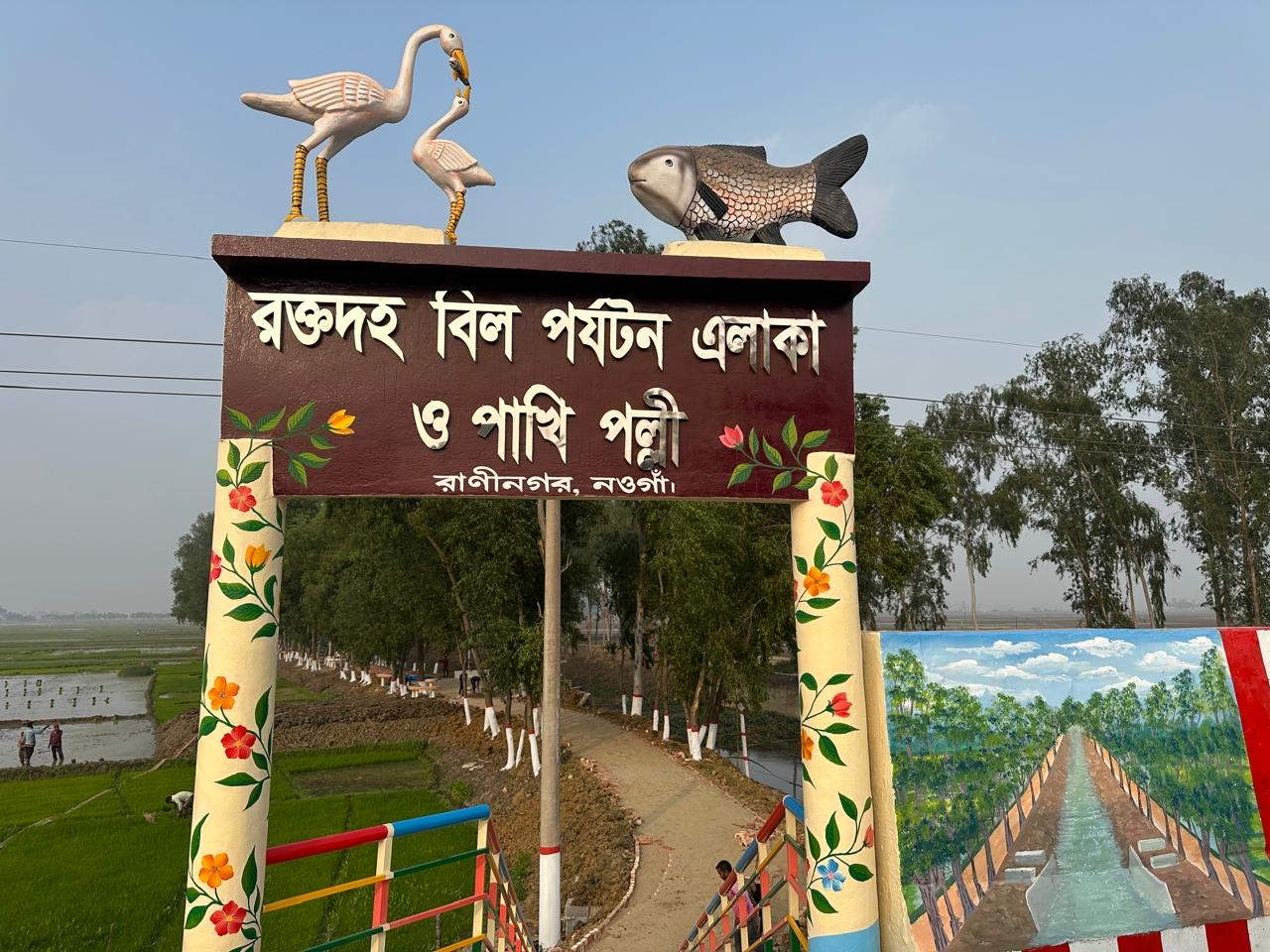
- Raktadaha Beel Tourist Area Entrance, Raninagar

- Coordinates: 24°44′N 88°58.5′E
- Country: Bangladesh
- Division: Rajshahi
- District: Naogaon

Area
  - Total: 258.32 km^{2} (99.74 sq mi)

Population (2022)
  - Total: 192,226
  - Density: 744.14/km^{2} (1,927.3/sq mi)
- Time zone: UTC+6 (BST)
- Postal code: 6590
- Website: Official Map of Raninagar

Raninagar Upazila mauza geocode map

Raninagar Upazila (Bengali: রাণীনগর উপজেলা) is an Upazila of Naogaon District in the Division of Rajshahi, Bangladesh.

== Geography ==
Map of Naogaon District

Raninagar is located at 24.7333°N 88.9750°E. It has 45,637 households and total area 258.32 km^{2}.

The upazila is bounded by Naogaon Sadar Upazila and Adamdighi Upazila of Bogra District on the north, Atrai upazila on the south, Nandigram Upazila of Bogra District and Singra Upazila of Natore district on the east and Manda upazila on the west.

== Demographics ==
Religions in Raninagar Upazila (2022)
Religion	Percent
Islam	89.55%
Hinduism	10.42%
Other or not stated	0.03%

According to the 2022 Bangladeshi census, Raninagar Upazila had 52,205 households and a population of 192,226. 7.66% of the population were under 5 years of age. Raninagar had a literacy rate (age 7 and over) of 70.44%: 73.61% for males and 67.47% for females, and a sex ratio of 94.98 males for every 100 females. 14,362 (7.47%) lived in urban areas.

According to the 2011 Census of Bangladesh, Raninagar Upazila had 45,637 households and a population of 184,778. 37,183 (20.12%) were under 10 years of age. Raninagar had a literacy rate (age 7 and over) of 46.04%, compared to the national average of 51.8%, and a sex ratio of 1017 females per 1000 males. 6,808 (3.68%) lived in urban areas.

As of the 1991 Bangladesh census, Raninagar has a population of 158244. Males constituted 50.94% of the population, and females 49.06%. This Upazila's eighteen up population was 79,136. Raninagar had an average literacy rate of 28.4% (7+ years), and the national average of 32.4% literate.

== Administration ==
Raninagar, primarily formed as a Thana in 1916, was turned into an upazila in 1983.

The upazila is divided into eight union parishads: Bargachha, Ekdala, Gona, Kaligram, Kashimpur, Mirat, Parail, and Raninagar. The union parishads are subdivided into 188 mauzas and 174 villages.

== See also ==
- Upazilas of Bangladesh
- Districts of Bangladesh
- Divisions of Bangladesh
