= Fakhrul Imam =

Bangladeshi politician

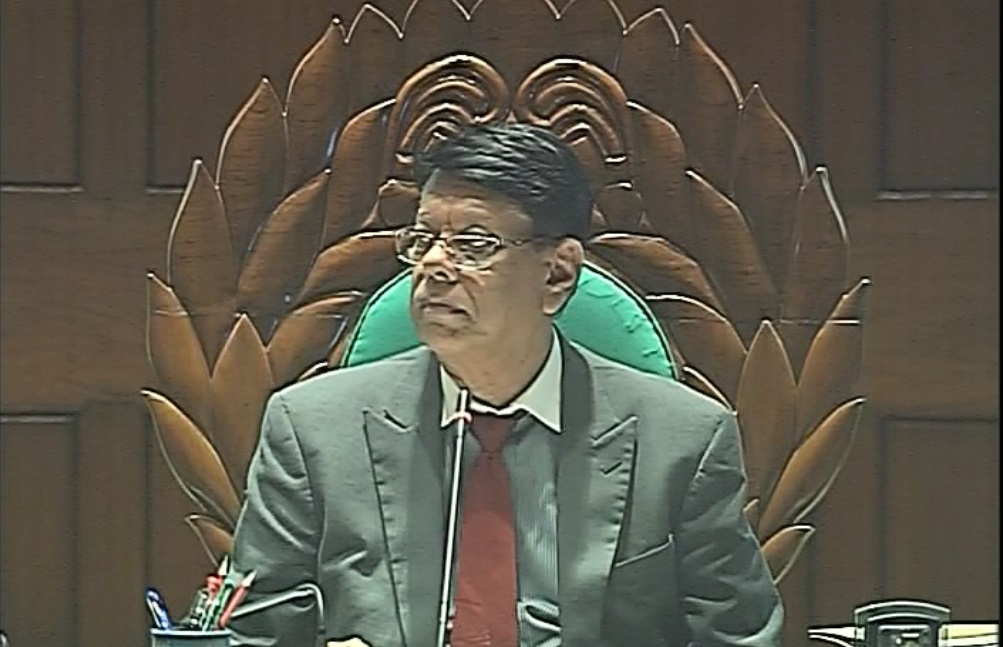

Jatiya Sangsad

Member of Parliamentary Standing Committee, Public Accounts Committee

Member of Parliament for Mymensingh-8
- In office 1988–1990
- President: Hussain Muhammad Ershad

Member of Parliamentary Standing Committee, Standing Committee on Ministry of Home Affairs

Member of Parliament for Mymensingh-8
- In office 2013–2018

Member of Parliamentary Standing Committee, Committee on Government Assurances

Member of Parliament for Mymensingh-8
- In office 2019–2024

Personal details
- Born: 9 February 1948 (age 78) Mymensingh
- Citizenship: Bangladesh
- Party: Jatiya Party

Fakhrul Imam (Bengali: ফখরুল ইমাম) is a Bangladeshi politician and former Member of Parliament from Mymensingh-8. He is also known as one of the most veteran parliamentarians in Bangladesh.

Imam was elected to Parliament from Mymensingh-8 as a Jatiya Party candidate in 1988, 2014 and re-elected on 30 December 2018.
