= Ishwarganj Upazila =

Ishwarganj ঈশ্বরগঞ্জ
- Upazila
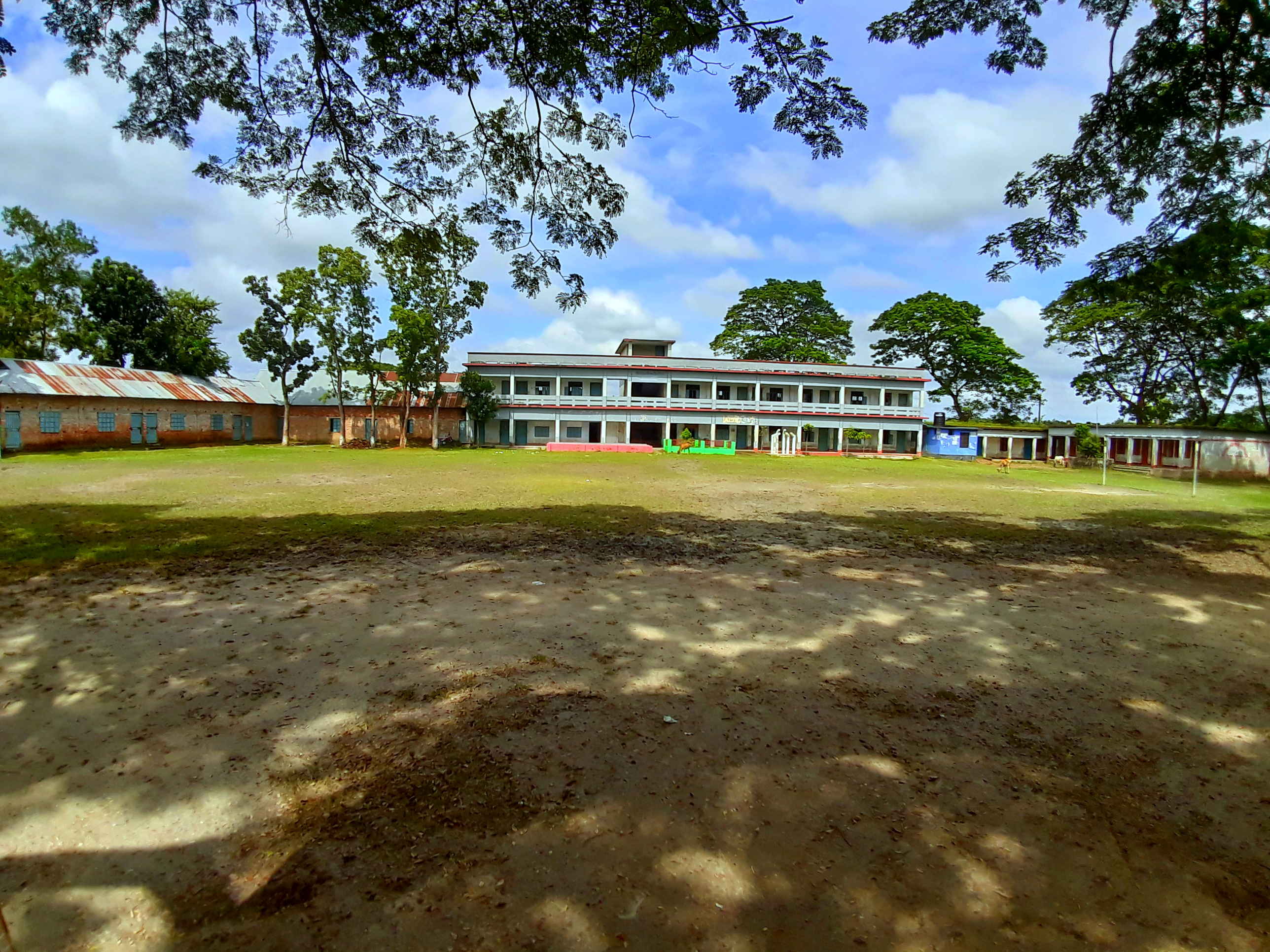
- Mollikpur Laksmiganj High School

- Coordinates: 24°39′0″N 90°30′0″E
- Country: Bangladesh
- Division: Mymensingh
- District: Mymensingh
- Headquarters: Ishwarganj

Government
  - Type: Upazila Parishad
  - Chairman: A. K. M. Faridullah
  - MP (Mymensingh-8): vacant

Area
  - Total: 280.43 km^{2} (108.27 sq mi)

Population (2022)
  - Total: 404,613
  - Density: 1,442.8/km^{2} (3,736.9/sq mi)
- Time zone: UTC+6 (BST)
- Postal code: 2280
- Area code: 09027
- Website: iswarganj.mymensingh.gov.bd

Ishwarganj Upazila mauza geocode map

Ishwarganj (Bengali: ঈশ্বরগঞ্জ) is an administrative area in north-eastern Bangladesh. It is an upazila in Mymensingh District.

== History ==
Bhulsoma Mosque was established in 1600, and the Naluapara Mosque in 1625.

In 1936, Pitalganj was established as a thana. It was renamed to Ishwarganj in honour of boatman Ishwari Patni. On 16 October 1971, during the Bangladesh War of Independence, six Bengali fighters were killed by Pakistani troops. Ishwarganj was captured on 9 December 1971. The thana was upgraded to an upazila in 1983.

== Geography ==
Ishwarganj has a total area of 280.43 km^{2}. It borders Gauripur Upazila to the north, Nandail Upazila to the south, Kendua Upazila to the east, and Trishal Upazila to the west. It is 147 km from Dhaka and 24 km from Mymensingh.

The Kanchamatia River flows through the upazila into the Narasunda River.

== Demographics ==
Historical population
Year	Pop.	±%
1981	274,694	—
1991	306,977	+11.8%
2001	338,080	+10.1%
2011	376,348	+11.3%
2022	404,613	+7.5%
Source: Bangladesh Bureau of Statistics

Religions in Ishwarganj Upazila (2022)
Religion	Percent
Islam	97.01%
Hinduism	2.99%
Other or not stated	0.00%

According to the 2022 Bangladeshi census, Ishwarganj Upazila had 97,445 households and a population of 404,613. 10.60% of the population were under 5 years of age. Ishwarganj had a literacy rate (age 7 and over) of 66.82%: 68.63% for males and 65.09% for females, and a sex ratio of 96.08 males for 100 females. 57,115 (14.12%) lived in urban areas.

== Points of interest ==
Nearby places of interest include the Atharabari Railway Station, Luxmigonj Bazar, Mizebag, Mirzapur, Tarundia, Uchakhila, Boro hit, Sohagi Railway Station, and Uchakhila Bazar.

Atharabari has been known for its Rayerbazar for centuries.

Khalbala Bazar offers locally made jute products.

== Administration ==
Ishwarganj Upazila is divided into Ishwarganj Municipality and 11 union parishads: Atharabari, Barahit, Iswarganj, Jatia, Magtula, Maijbagh, Rajibpur, Sarisha, Sohagi, Tarundia, and Uchakhila. The union parishads are subdivided into 293 mauzas and 294 villages.

Ishwarganj Municipality is subdivided into 9 wards and 13 mahallas.

Ishwarganj's Member of the Parliament is Lutfullahel Majed. Its Upazila Chairman is Badrul Alom Prodip. The Vice Chairman is Sheikh Waliullah Rasel. The female Vice Chairman is Shefali Hamid. [BNP]. Its Upazila Nirbahi Officer (UNO) is Hafiza Jasmin.

=== List of chairmen ===
List of chairmen
Name
Ahmad Husayn Bhuiyan
Saumyendra Kishore Chowdhury
Mahmud Hasan Sumon

== Economy ==
The economy of the region centers on agriculture, accounting for 70.52% of income. 70,718 acres are under cultivation. Other sectors include business (10.22%) and services (3.84%).

== Education ==
Ishwaraganj's educational institutes include:

- Ishwarganj Degree College
- Ishwarganj Bisweswari Pilot High School
- Abdul Khaleque Moksuda High School
- Uchakhila Higher Secondary School and college
- Ishwarganj Mohila College
- Atharabari College
- Alinogor Technical & Commercial College
- Atharabari M.C. High School
- Barohit High School
- Charjhithor High School
- Charnikhla High School
- Ishwargonj Ideal College
- Jatia High School
- Kasimpur High School
- Konapara High School
- Madhupur M.L. High School
- Maizbag Pas Para High School
- Mollik pur High School, (Laxmigonj)
- Moricharchor High School
- Postail High School
- Rajibpue AU High School
- Shakhua Adarsha Bidya Niketon High school
- Shohagi Union High School
- Tarundia Jagat Memorial High School
- Protishruti Model High School
- D.S. Kamil Madrasha
- Kazir Bolsha Dakhil Madrasha
- Mohespur Dakil Madrasha
- Pitambar Para Alia Madrasha, (Laxmigonj)
- Shakhwa Mozidia Dakhil Madrasha
- Uchakhila Keramotia S.A Madrasha
- Dhitpur High School
- Sree Nogor Dakhil Madrasha
- Rawlar Char Alim Madrasha
- Kumaruli High School
- Fanur Ashraful Ulom Dhakil Madrasha
- Madhupur abbasia DS Dhakil Madrasha

== Notable people ==
- Abdul Hye Mashreki, litterateur
- Fakhrul Imam, politician
- Abdus Sattar, parliamentarian
- Shah Nurul Kabir, politician
- Zainul Abedin, politician
- Omar Faruk|Educator,Thinker and Social activist

== See also ==
- Upazilas of Bangladesh
- Districts of Bangladesh
- Divisions of Bangladesh
- Administrative geography of Bangladesh
