= Shiva temple of stone =

Temple from bangladesh

- পাথরের শিব মন্দির
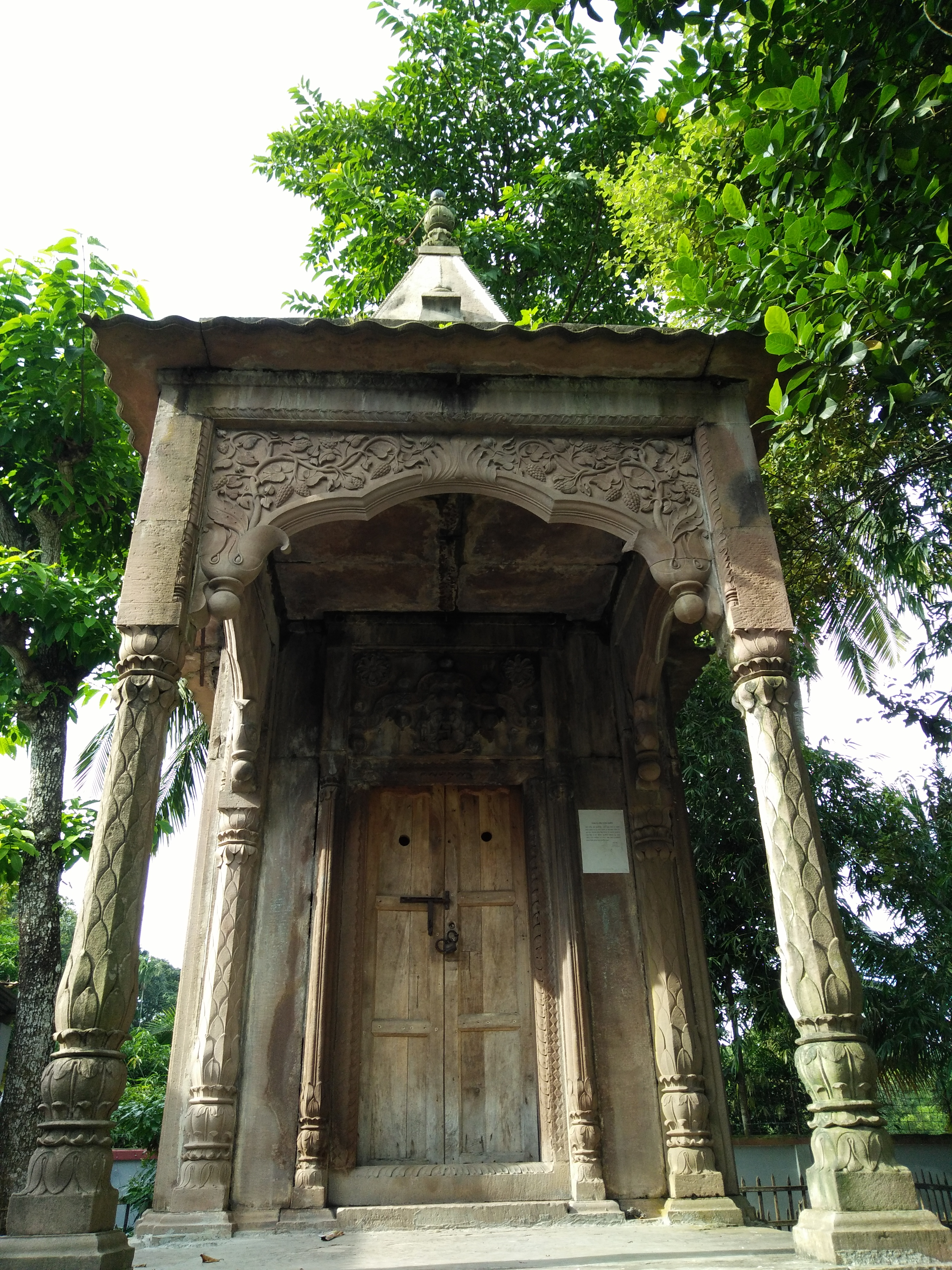
- Shiva temple of stone

Religion
- Affiliation: Hindu
- District: Mymensingh district
- Festivals: Durga Puja, Shiva Puja
- Ownership: Department of Archaeology

Location
- Location: Muktagachha, Mymensingh district, Bangladesh
- Country: Bangladesh
- Interactive map of Shiva temple of stone
- Coordinates: 24°46′6.13″N 90°26′56.78″E

Architecture
- Architect: Moyej Uddin
- Funded by: Jagat Kishore Acharya Chowdhury
- Established: 1270

Shiva Temple of Stone (Bengali: পাথরের শিব মন্দির) is an ancient temple and archaeological site located in Mymensingh district of Bangladesh. Raja Jagat Kishore Acharya, the then zamindar of Atani in Muktagachha built the temple with the help of architect Moyez Uddin. It is the temple set up by the zamindars in front of the Armed Police Battalion Camp in Muktagachha.

== History ==
In 1826, with the grace of Nawab Murshid Quli Khan, Muktagacha became habitable and started zamindari. Later, 16 landlord lived here. For this, the place is known as '16 Hissar Zamindar' meaning in English 'region of 16 landlord'. One of those 16 zamindars was Raja Jagat Kishore Acharya, the zamindar of Atani. He built a stone Shiva temple in 183 with the famous architect Moyez Uddin of Patna, India. Jagat Kishore gave a lot of gifts to Acharya Moyez Uddin for the construction of this temple.

== Descriptions ==
The temple is built of stone. There are various designs on the walls, herbaceous work on the dome and beautiful arch work.

== See also ==
- List of archaeological sites in Bangladesh
