= Muktagacha Upazila =

Muktagacha মুক্তাগাছা
- Upazila
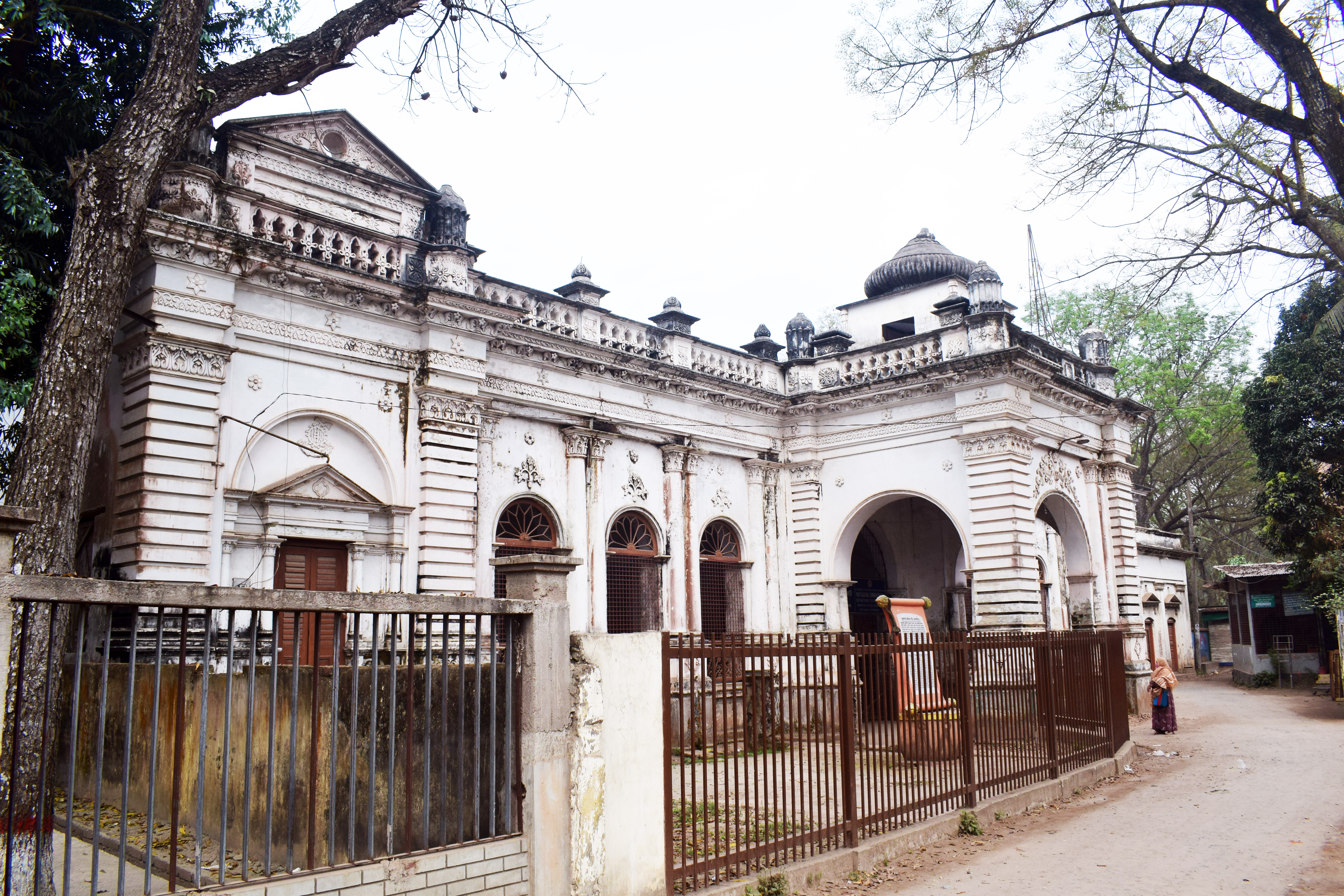
- Muktagacha Zamindar Bari

- Coordinates: 24°45.5′N 90°16′E
- Country: Bangladesh
- Division: Mymensingh
- District: Mymensingh
- Headquarters: Muktagachha

Government
  - Municipal Mayor: Billal Hossain Sarkar

Area
  - Total: 314.70 km^{2} (121.51 sq mi)

Population (2022)
  - Total: 460,389
  - Density: 1,462.9/km^{2} (3,789.0/sq mi)
- Time zone: UTC+6 (BST)
- Postal code: 2210
- Area code: 091
- Website: Official Map of Muktagacha

Muktagachha Upazila mauza geocode map

Muktagacha (Bengali: মুক্তাগাছা) is an Upazila of Mymensingh District. in the Division of Mymensingh, Bangladesh. It is known for sweets which are made here, called "Monda". It is also known for the Rajbari of Brahmin family (a Zamindar's residence) which is currently used as an educational institute, Shahid Shrity College.

== Etymology ==
The previous name of Muktagacha was Binodbari. When the Zamindars (kings) arrived from Natore, an inhabitant of the town, Muktaram Karmakar, presented them with a gold lamp-stand, locally called Gacha. This pleased the Zamindars. They wanted to acknowledge the present and show respect to Muktaram, so they renamed the town to Muktagacha.

== Geography ==
Muktagacha is located at 24.7583°N 90.2667°E. It has a total area of 314.70 km^{2}. It is bounded by Jamalpur Sadar upazila of Jamalpur district to the northwest, Mymensingh Sadar upazila to the northeast, Fulbaria upazila to the south and Madhupur upazila of Tangail district to the west.

== Demographics ==
Historical population
Year	Population	±%
1981	256,906	—
1991	321,759	+25.2%
2001	366,397	+13.9%
2011	415,473	+13.4%
2022	460,389	+10.8%
Source: Bangladesh Bureau of Statistics

Religions in Muktagacha Upazila (2022)
Religion	Percent
Islam	94.83%
Hinduism	5.01%
Other or not stated	0.16%

According to the 2022 Bangladeshi census, Muktagachha Upazila had 114,293 households and a population of 460,389. 10.80% of the population were under 5 years of age. Muktagachha had a literacy rate (age 7 and over) of 71.91%: 72.92% for males and 70.99% for females, and a sex ratio of 93.57 males for 100 females. 74,038 (16.08%) lived in urban areas.

== Arts and culture ==
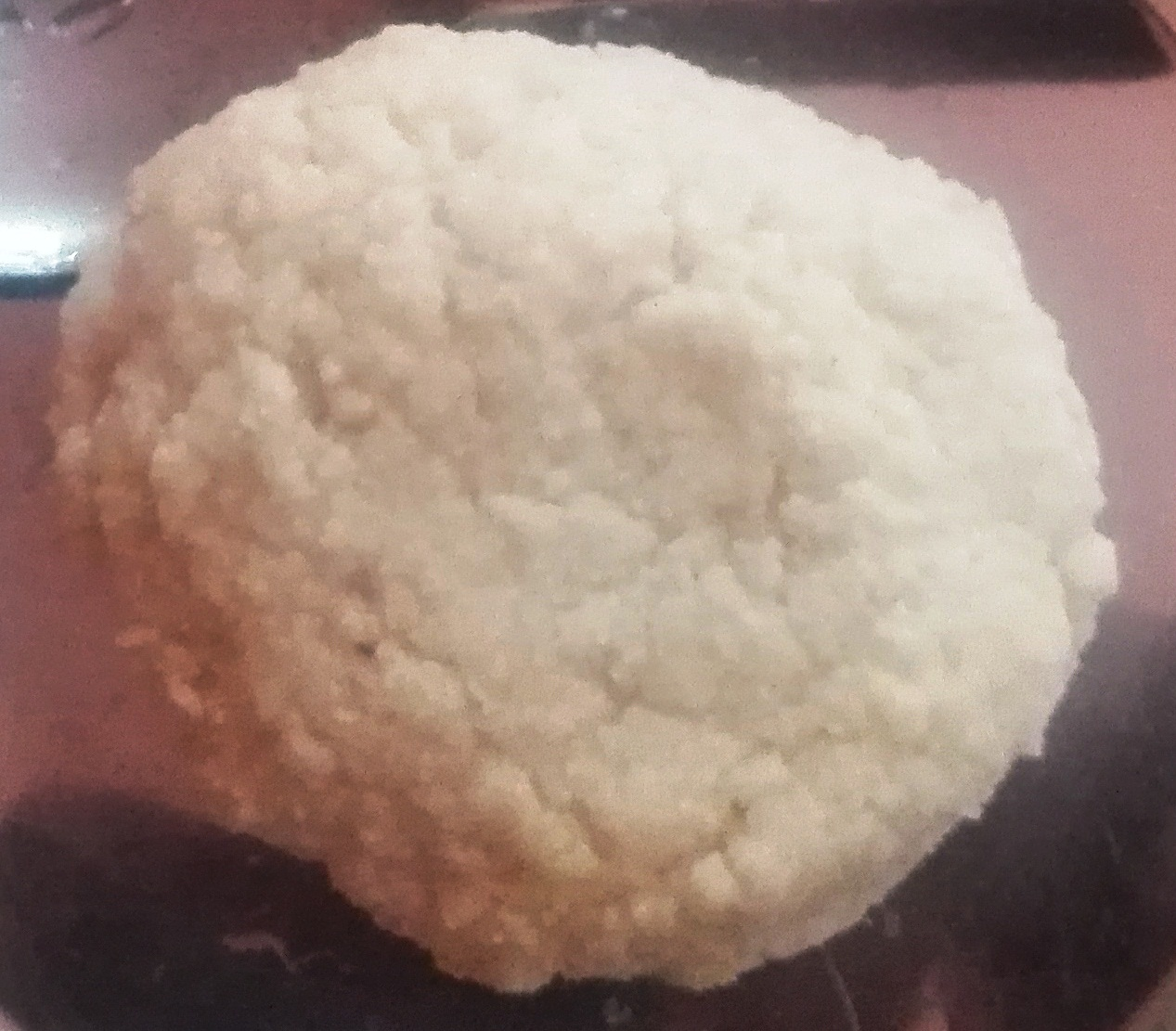
The traditional monda of Muktagacha, Mymensingh

The Muktagcha monda is a popular local sweetmeat.

== Administration ==
Muktagachha Thana was formed in 1961 and it was turned into an upazila in 1983. Muktagachha Municipality was formed in 1875.

Muktagacha Upazila is divided into Muktagacha Municipality and ten union parishads: Basati, Borogram, Daogaon, Dulla, Ghoga, Kashimpur, Kheruajani, Kumargata, Mankon, and Tarati. The union parishads are subdivided into 261 mauzas and 283 villages.

Muktagacha Municipality is subdivided into 9 wards and 21 mahallas.

Administration &public representative
Chairman	Vice Chairman	Woman Vice Chairman	Upazila Nirbahi Officer (UNO)
Abdul High Akonda	Arab Ali	Murshida Akter Kakoly	Shuborna Sarker

== Religious activities ==
Muktagacha has a long tradition of being a peaceful land decorated with religious harmony. Both the Hindus and Muslims are of brotherly nature and live peacefully together. Eid is celebrated with much grandeur and devotion. In this day, not only the Muslims visit each other's home but also the Hindus also visit Muslim homes as well. People share many food items and gifts to mark the occasion. Many fairs, locally called Mela, are held for weeks. Durga Puja is the main religious festival of the Hindu community here. During Durga Puja the whole town takes a festive look. People of all community enjoy the Puja holiday. Devotees and visitors go from one pandal to another to see the idols of Goddess Durga. On the day of Bijoyadashami, the idols are carried out in long processions and then immersed into nearby water bodies. Besides these all other religious activities are peacefully observed. There is a 200-year-old twin Shiva Temple just outside the zamindar-house where Durga Puja is also celebrated.

== Major zamindaris of Mymensingh ==
- Susanga (Maharaja) (3rd in the Order of Precedence in the Government House of Calcutta before 1947)
- Ramgopalpur(raja)
- Ratanpur (nawab)
- Gouripur (Babu)
- Kalipur (Babu)
- Malotipur (Babu)

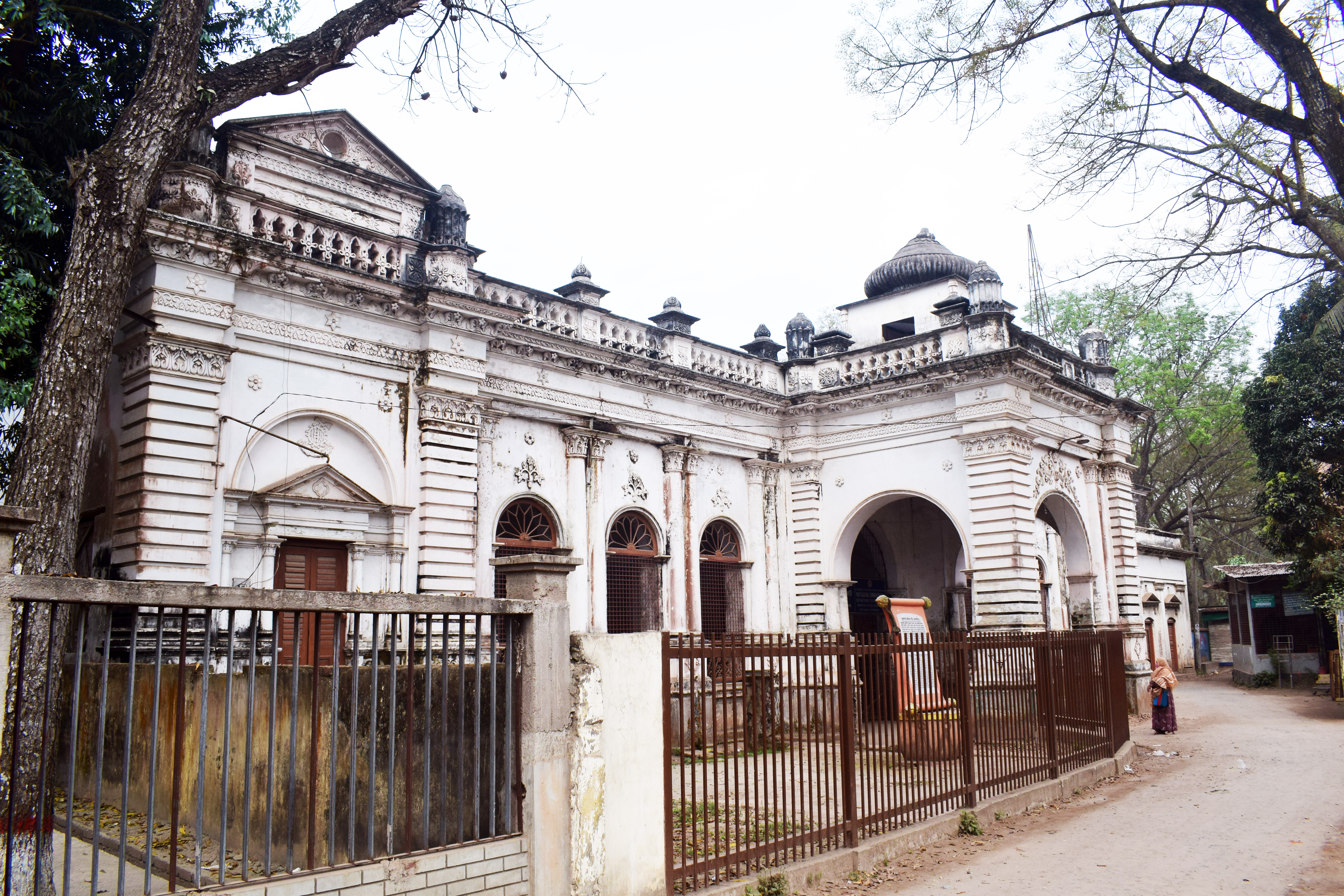
Aat Ani Zamindar Bari, Muktagacha

== Schools and colleges ==
Schools

1. Muktagacha RK Govt. High School
2. NN Girls High School
3. Nabarun Bidyaniketan
4. Hamida Sultana Girls High School
5. Montola High School
6. Armed Batalian High School
7. Gabtali High School
8. Chachua High School
9. Mankun High School
10. Bahenga Govt. Primary School
11. Mogaltula Secondary School

Colleges

1. Govt. Shahid Smriti College
2. Muktagacha Mahabidyaloy
3. Hazi Kashem Ali Degree College
4. Gabtali Degree College
5. Mymensingh Physical Education College

== See also ==
- Upazilas of Bangladesh
- Districts of Bangladesh
- Divisions of Bangladesh
