= Muktagachha Shiva temple =

Anandomoyee Twin Temple
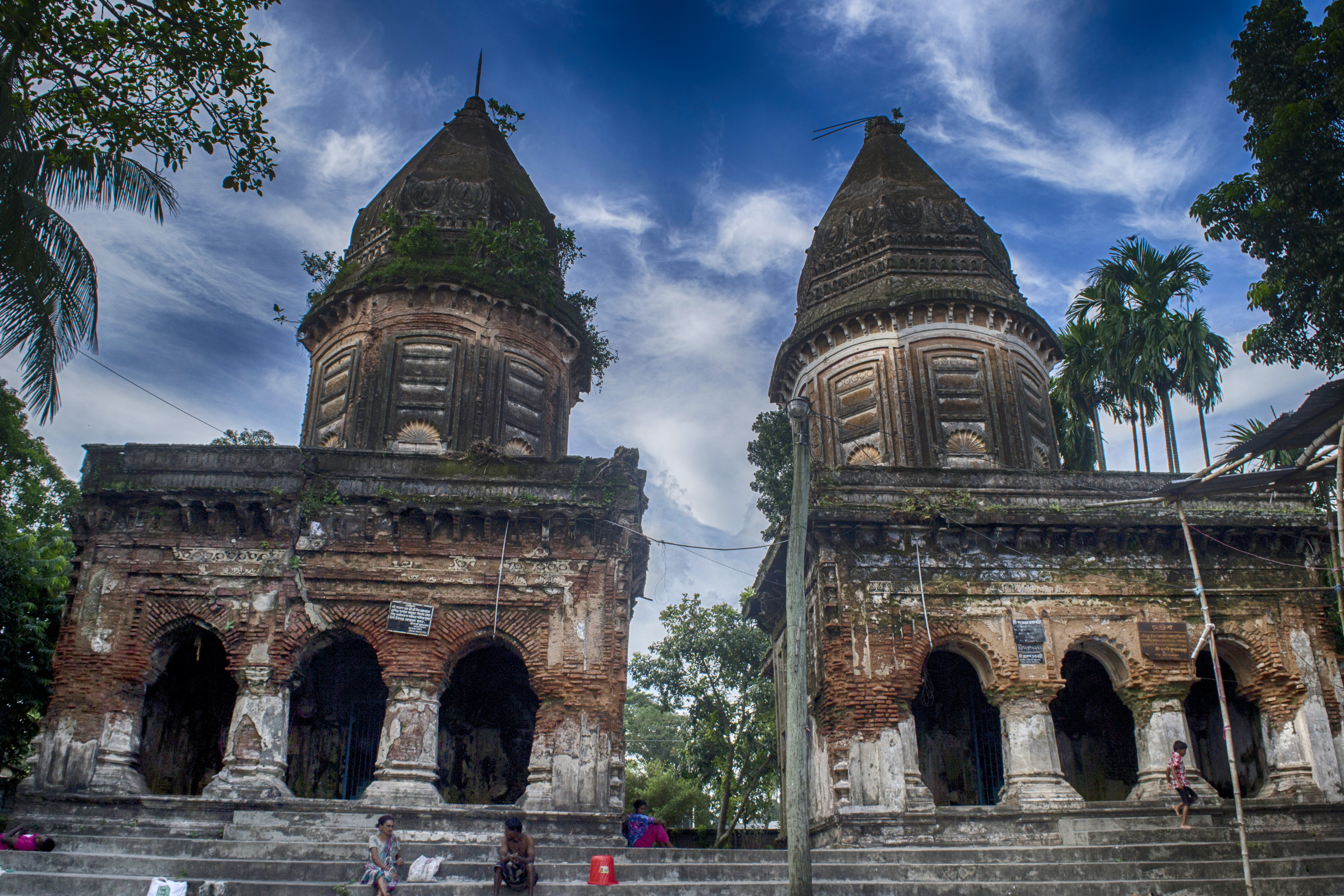
- Anandomoyee Twin Temple
- Interactive map of the Anandomoyee Twin Temple area

General information
- Location: Muktagacha Upazila, Mymensingh
- Coordinates: 24.7674°N 90.2558°E

The Muktagachha Shiva temple is a twin temple located outside the Rajbari of Muktagachha, located in the Mymensingh District of Bangladesh. The temple was constructed in 1820 by Rani Bimola Devi, the mother of Maharaja Shashikantha Acharya Choudhary, the Zamindar of Muktagachha. The twin temples consist of the Shree Shree Anandamoyi Shiva and Kali Mata Mandir. The Hindu Rabidas community performs a two-day-long Kattyani Puja, locally known as the 'Shat' Puja, in the Bengali month of Kartik. The temple is in dilapidated condition due to a lack of repairs.

== History ==
Two symmetrical temples build around 1820 by Rani Bimola Devi, mother of Maharaja Shoshi Kanta Acharaya, the Zamindar of Muktagacha. These two adjacent temples are great examples of mirror structures in Bengal being one of the heritage sites in Bangladesh. Both temples are serving as temples of Shiv Maheshwar and Anadamoyi Kali. Bimaladevi, the daughter-in-law of Raghunandan Acharya Chowdhury initiated the build of this unique structure after the name of her mother Anandamoyee.

== Key features ==
The architectural style is Nagara. It has a square Garbhagriha (Womb Chamber) in each temple. It has a flat roof called Mandapa. The temple is highly decorated with plaster especially the part that contains Shikhara (the representational mountain) above the roof. It is oblong in shape with conical shape tops and small corridors on a high basement which is connected to the staircase leading to a large pond. The temples are symmetrical and identical. There is a pond on the north of the temple in front of the entrance.

== Physically significant features ==
Wall: Brick with Lime mortar and plaster, Roof: Lime, concrete, and plaster, Plaster: Lime, Shikhara: Ornamented

== State of conservation ==
State of Conservation: Very rickety, major cracks on the roof and walls as rainwater drips through them. Structural Stability: At the risk of collapse Level of intervention: No initiative has yet been taken by the local authorities and DoA from last 24 years. These two adjacent temples are great examples of mirror structures in Bengal being one of the heritage sites in Bangladesh. Both temples are serving as temples of Shiv Maheshwar and Anadamoyee Kali.

== Culturally significant features ==
The twin temples consist of the Shree Shree Anandamoyi Shiva and Kali Mata Mandir. The Hindu Ravidas community performs a two-day-long Kattyani Puja, locally known as the 'Shat' Puja, in the Bengali month of Kartik. local people forgot the heritage value although the background of the temple is connecting to the Muktagacha Zamindar bari. It might lose its own identity if the temple is not well preserved and promoted. Must be restored, May be used for community festivals as originally meant for, along with associated activities like pooja, etc. Also, local people use the pond in front of the temples for religious purposes.

== Management ==
Unprotected and in 1993, the Department of Archaeology (DoA) under the Ministry of Cultural Affairs listed the temple as an archaeological site for its proper preservation but its condition has worsened over the last two decades, locals alleged. No initiative has been taken for maintenance so far. DoA( Department of Archaeology needs to preserve it as soon as possible before collapsing. The intervention can be done by reviving the temple and landscaping the area properly and make it more accessible. Collecting funds from the social and religious activities in the temples for financial support of the temple. The owner of “Muktagacha Zamindar Bari” can take the responsibility to revive it.
