= Muktagacha Zamindar Bari =

Old Zamindar palace in Muktagacha, Mymensingh

- Aat Ani Zamindar Bari (Bengali)
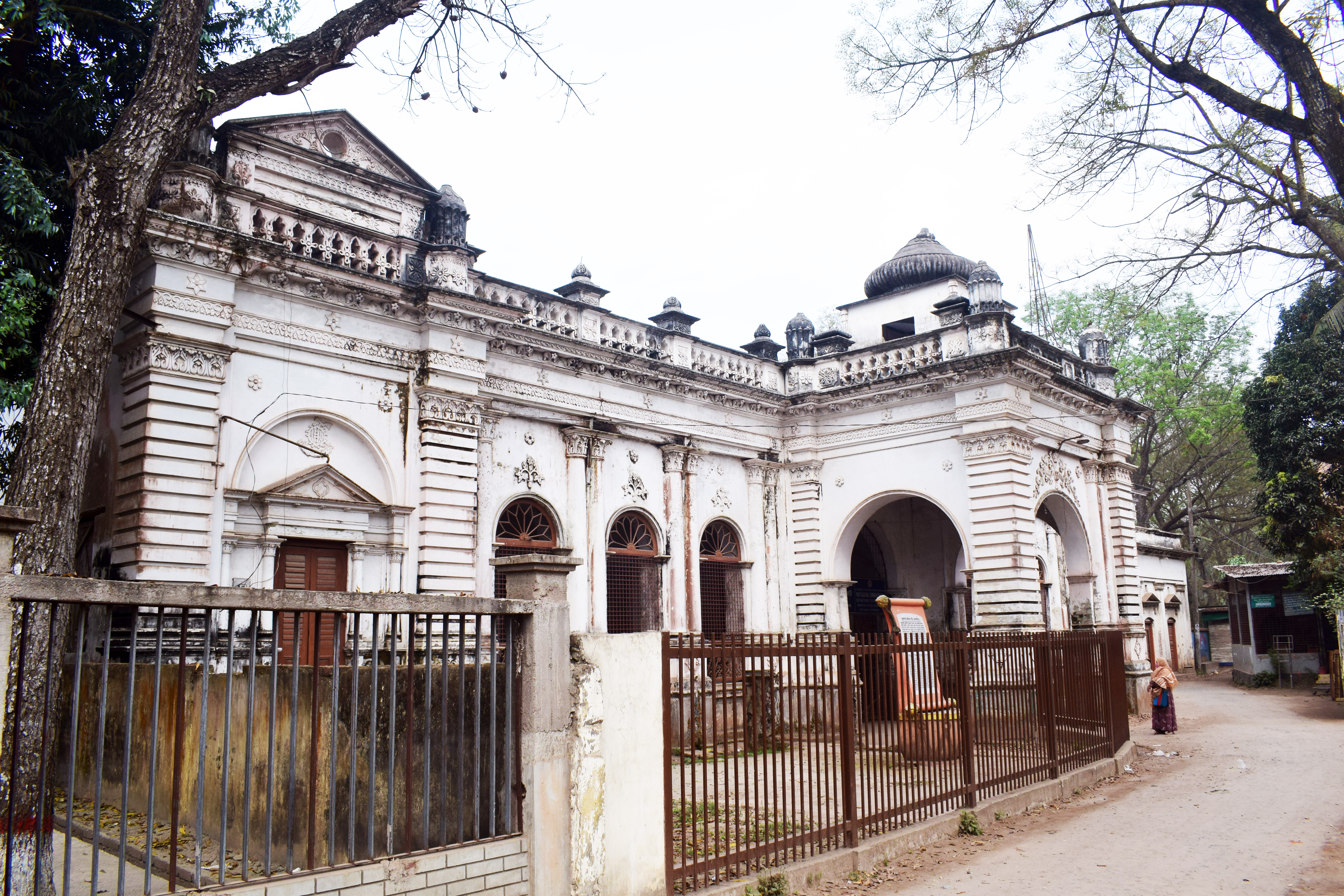
- Interactive map of Muktagacha Zamindar Bari
- 24.7693°N 90.2551°E
- Location: Muktagacha, Mymensingh, Bangladesh

Muktagacha Zamindar Bari (Bengali: মুক্তাগাছার জমিদার বাড়ি) or Aat Ani Zamindar Bari is an ancient zamindar palace located in Muktagacha Upazila of Mymensingh District, Bangladesh. The zamindar of Muktagacha was given the title of first Raja and then Maharaja by the British Raj, so the zamindar's residence was called Rajbari.

== History ==
Zamindar Acharya Chowdhury founded the city of Muktagacha. Acharya Chowdhury clan founded the city and settled here. Shri Krishna Acharya Chowdhury, the first male of the Acharya Chowdhury clan, was a resident of Bogra. He was working in the revenue department at the Durbar of Murshidabad. He was a very confidant of the Nawab. He was working in the revenue department at the Nawab's court in 1132 at that time.

After the end of Palashi War in 1757 AD, due to various reasons, the four sons of Shri Krishna Acharya Chowdhury decided to come to Alapsingh from Bogra. These four sons of Shri Krishna Acharya Chowdhury are Ramram, Harram, Vishnuram and Shivaram. Before settling, they visited various places in this pargana and decided to settle in the present Muktagacha area. At that time there was not much population in Alapsingh pargana.

Hareram is one of the zamindars of Muktagacha. This Hareram house is now the Rajbari. Mezzo son of Srikrishna Acharya Chowdhury, the founder of Muktagacha zamindari. The zamindar of this clan is known as the zamindar of the Atani house. Atani Jagat Kishore Acharya Chowdhury had a reputation. Jagat Kishore has 4 sons Jitendra, Birendra, Nrisingh and Bhupendra Kishore Acharya Chowdhury. Jeetendra Kishore's son is Jivendra Kishore Acharya Chowdhury.

== Architecture ==
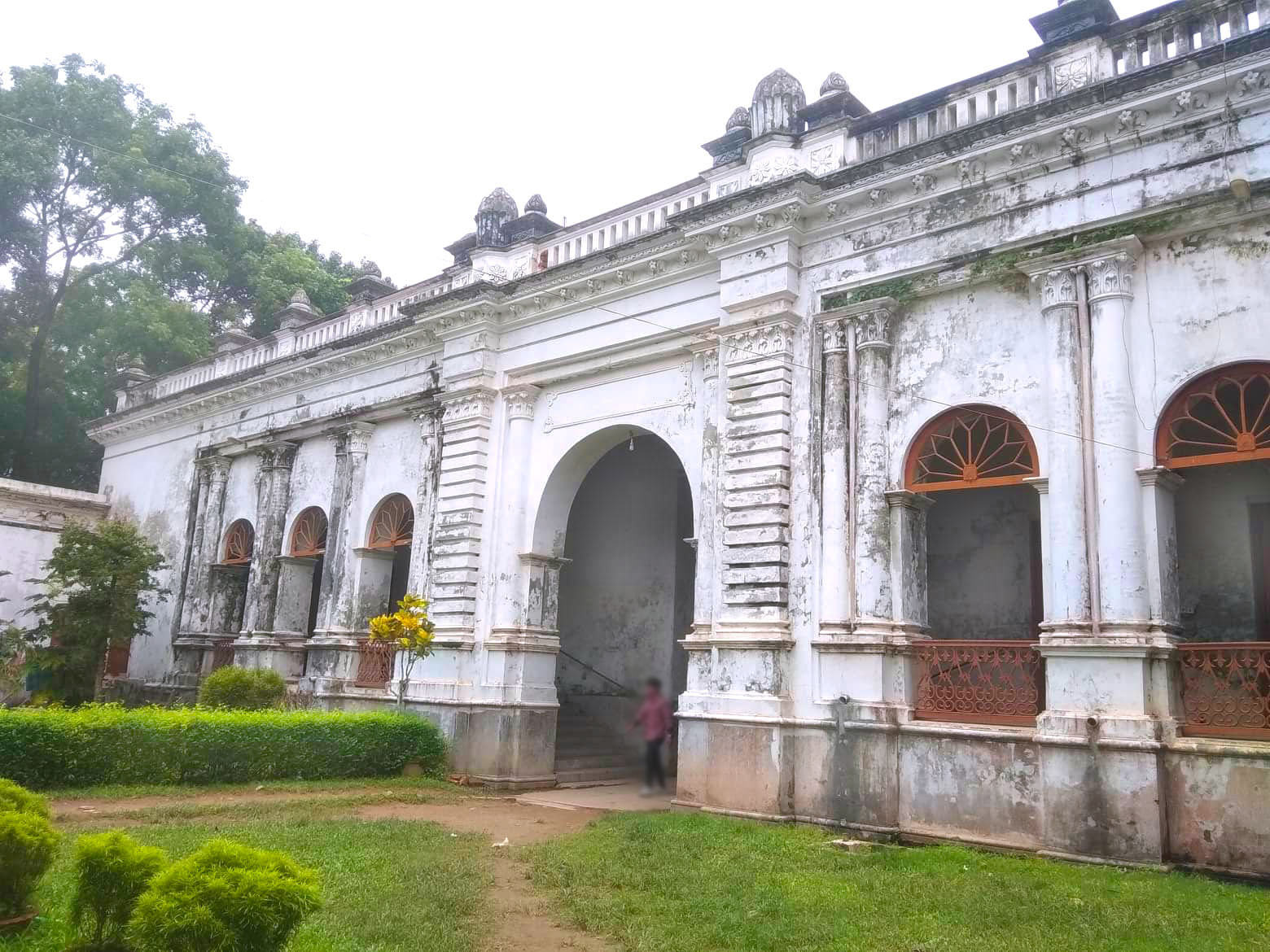
One side of the house

Muktagacha's zamindari is 16 in total. 16 zamindars ruled here. There is a huge gate at the entrance of Muktagacha Rajbari. Built on an area of about 100 acres, this royal palace is a unique example of ancient architecture.

== Revolving theater ==
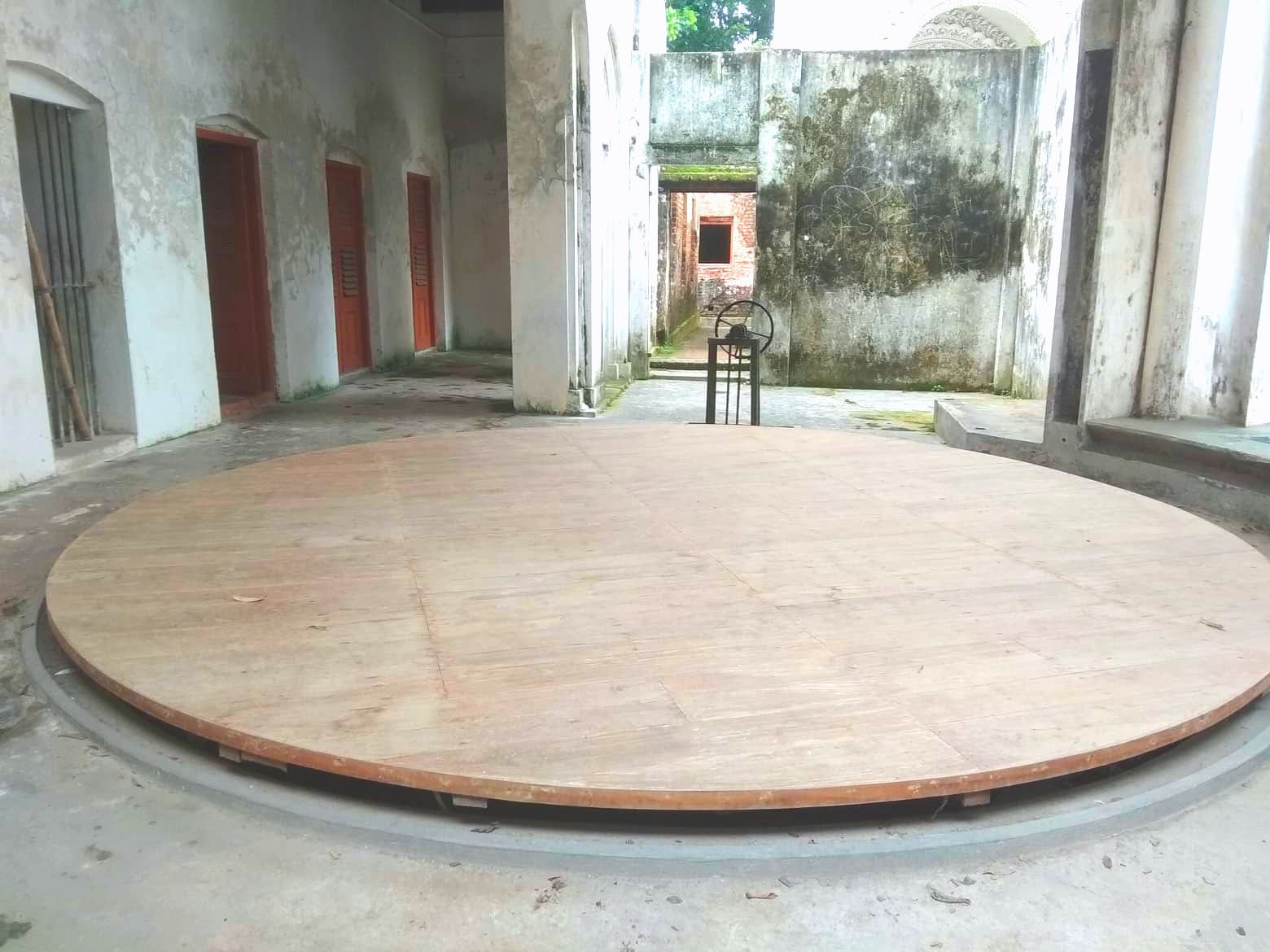
Revolving theater

Mymensingh has a long tradition of muktagacha plays. The cultural scene here was once very diverse. There was spontaneous participation of Muktagacha zamindars in drama, literature, culture etc. And this revolving stage made the drama more popular. Kumar Bhupendra Kishore, son of Zamindar Jagatkishore Acharya Chowdhury, was fond of drama. The stage was built as Bhupendra Rangapeeth after Bhupendra Kishore. It was the first such stage in Asia outside Kolkata.

== Gallery ==
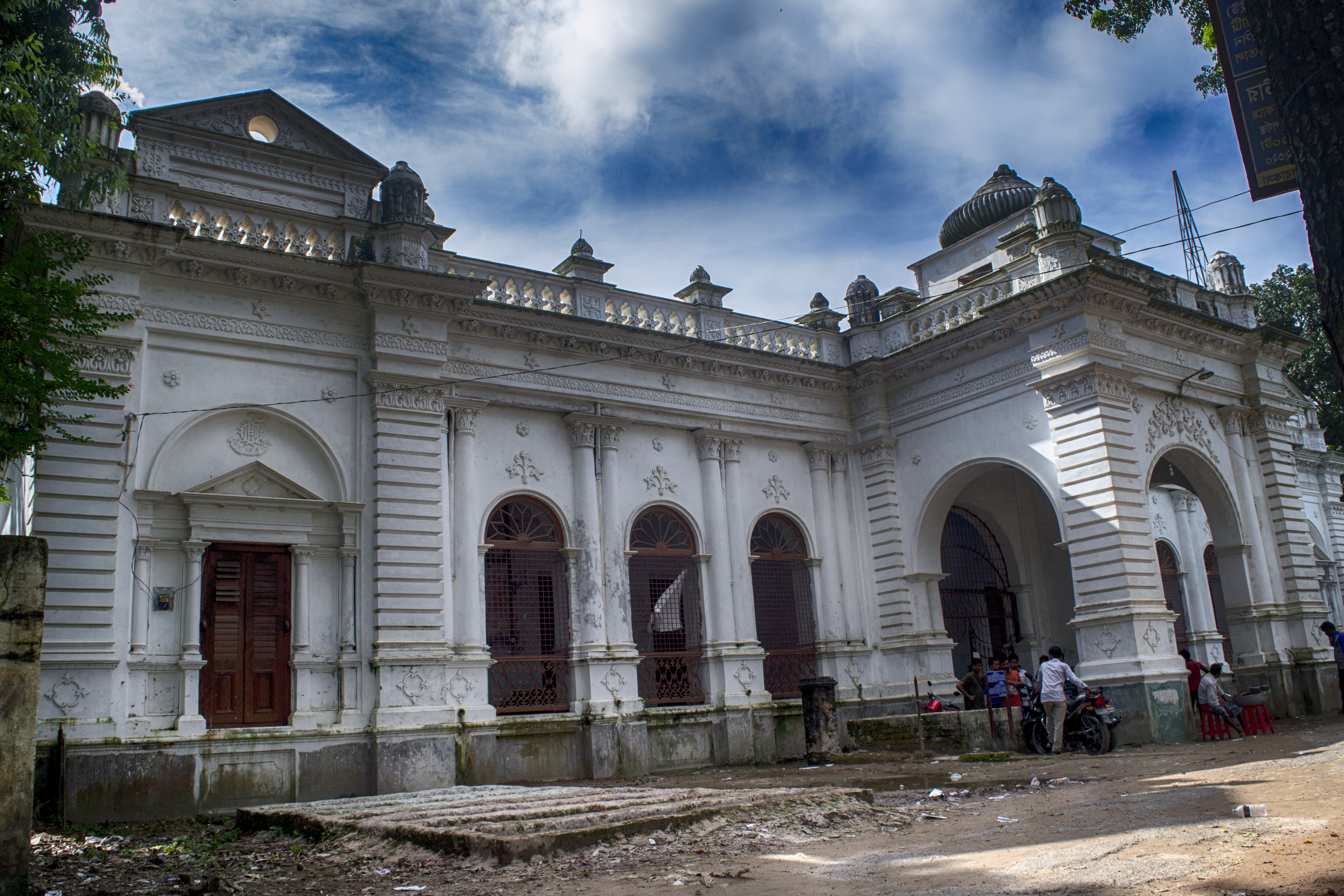

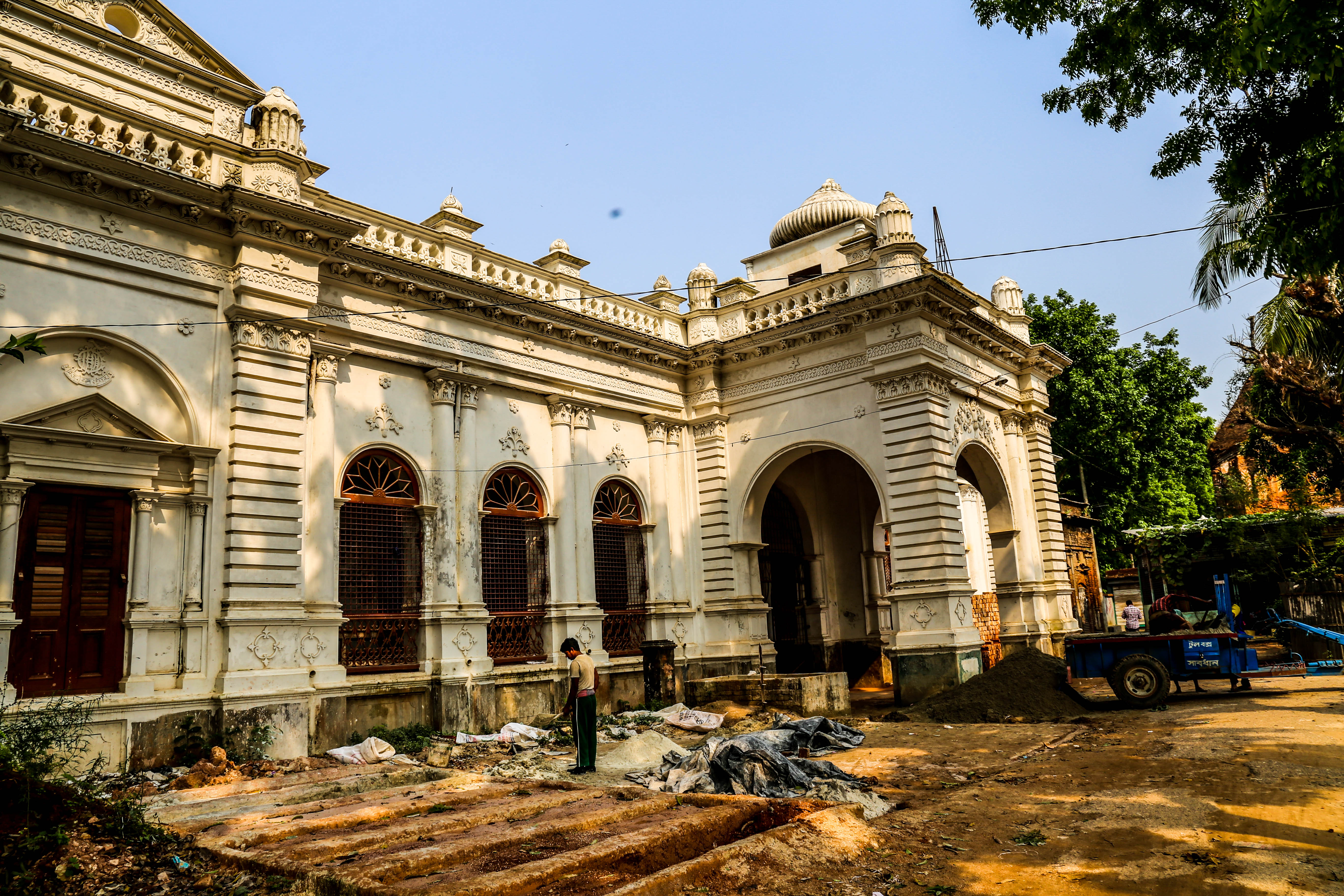

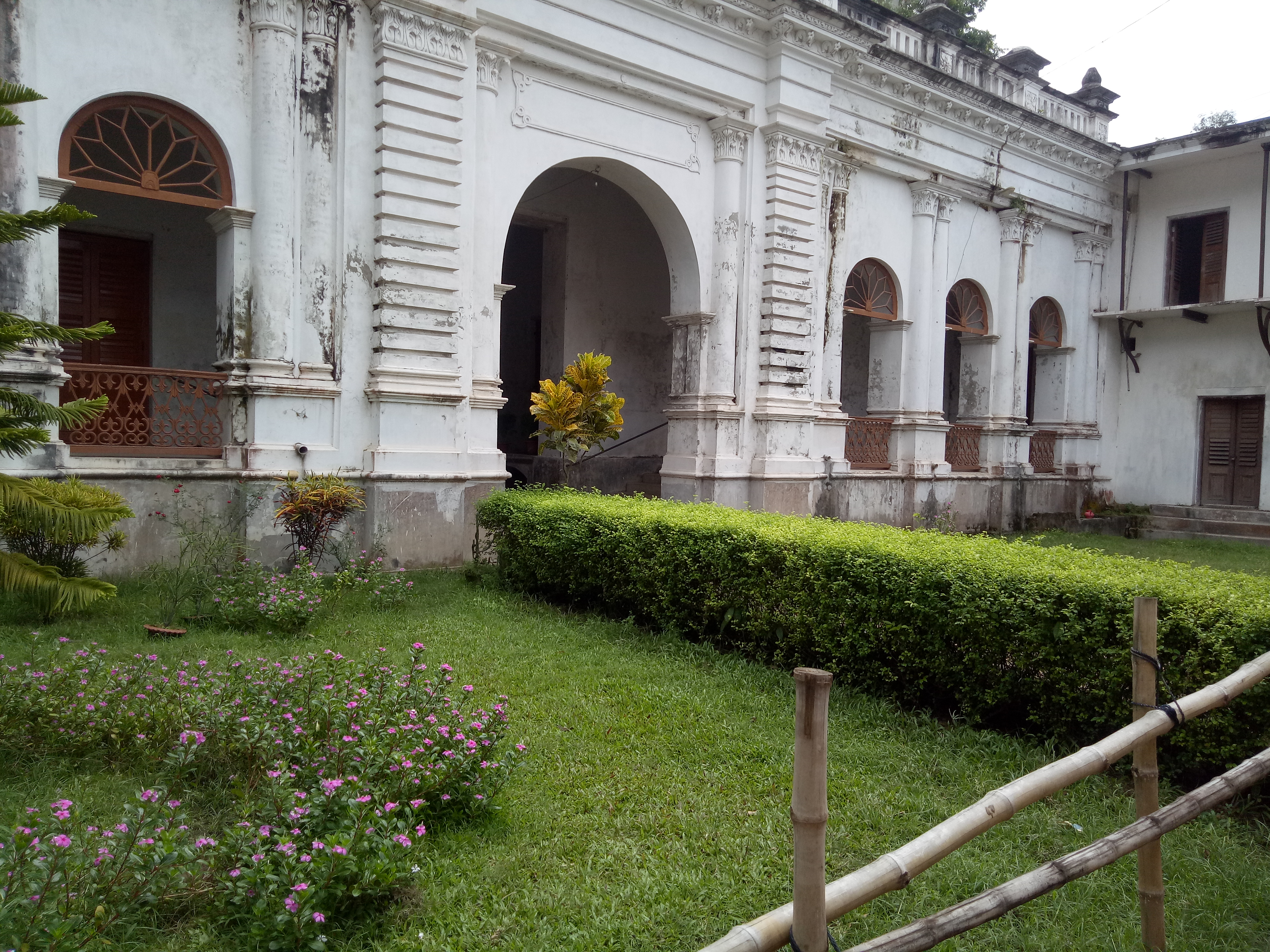

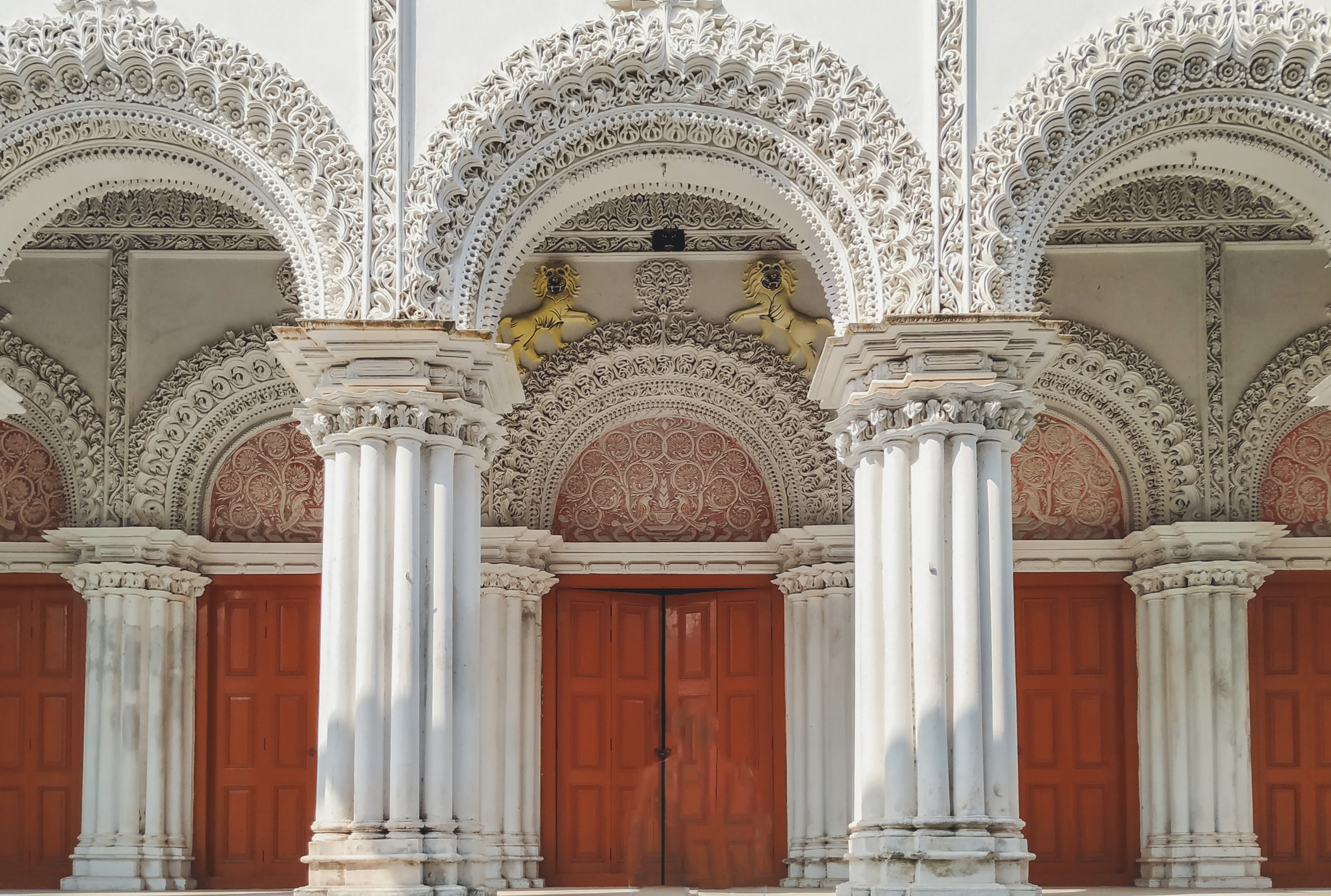

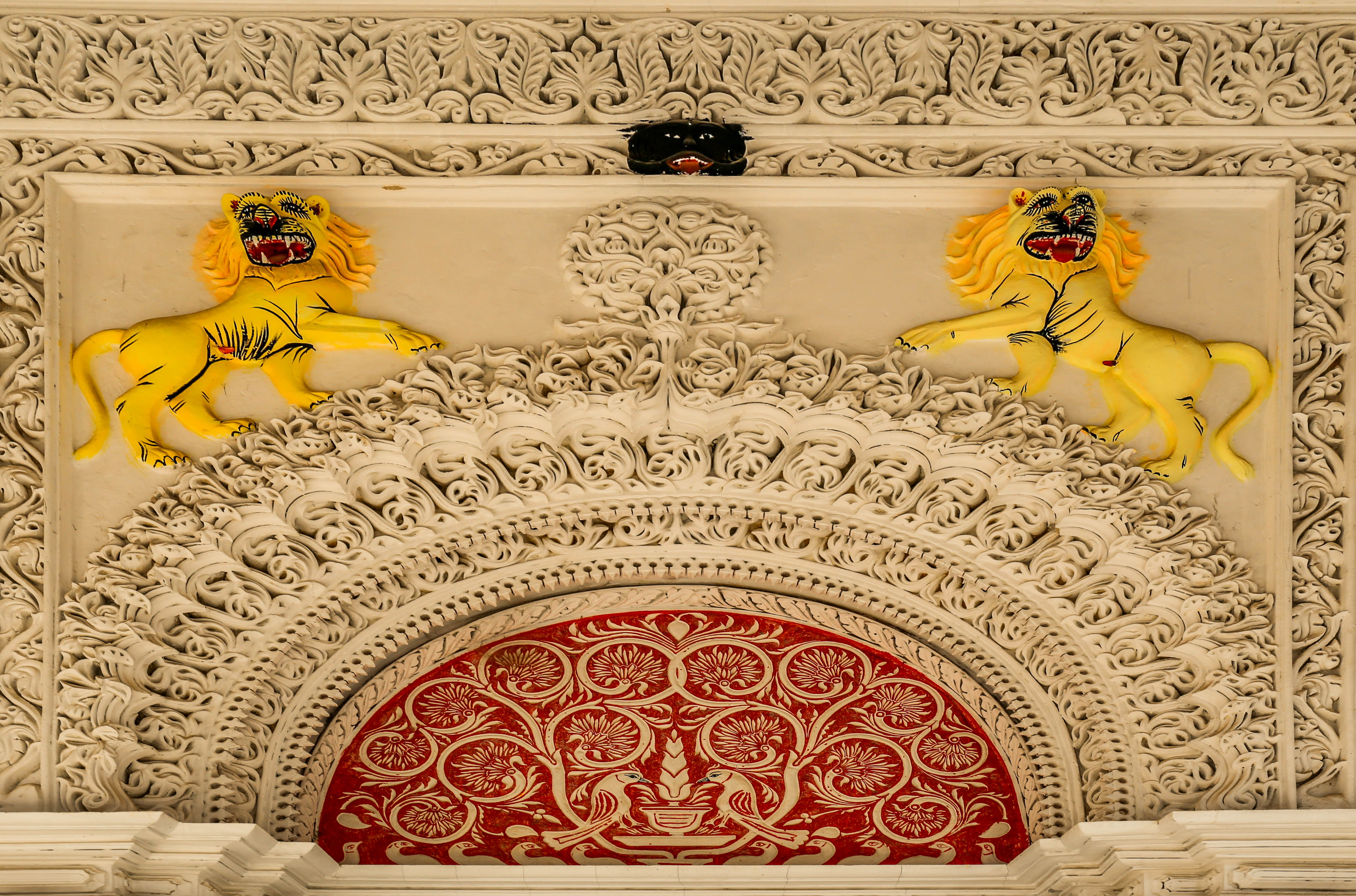

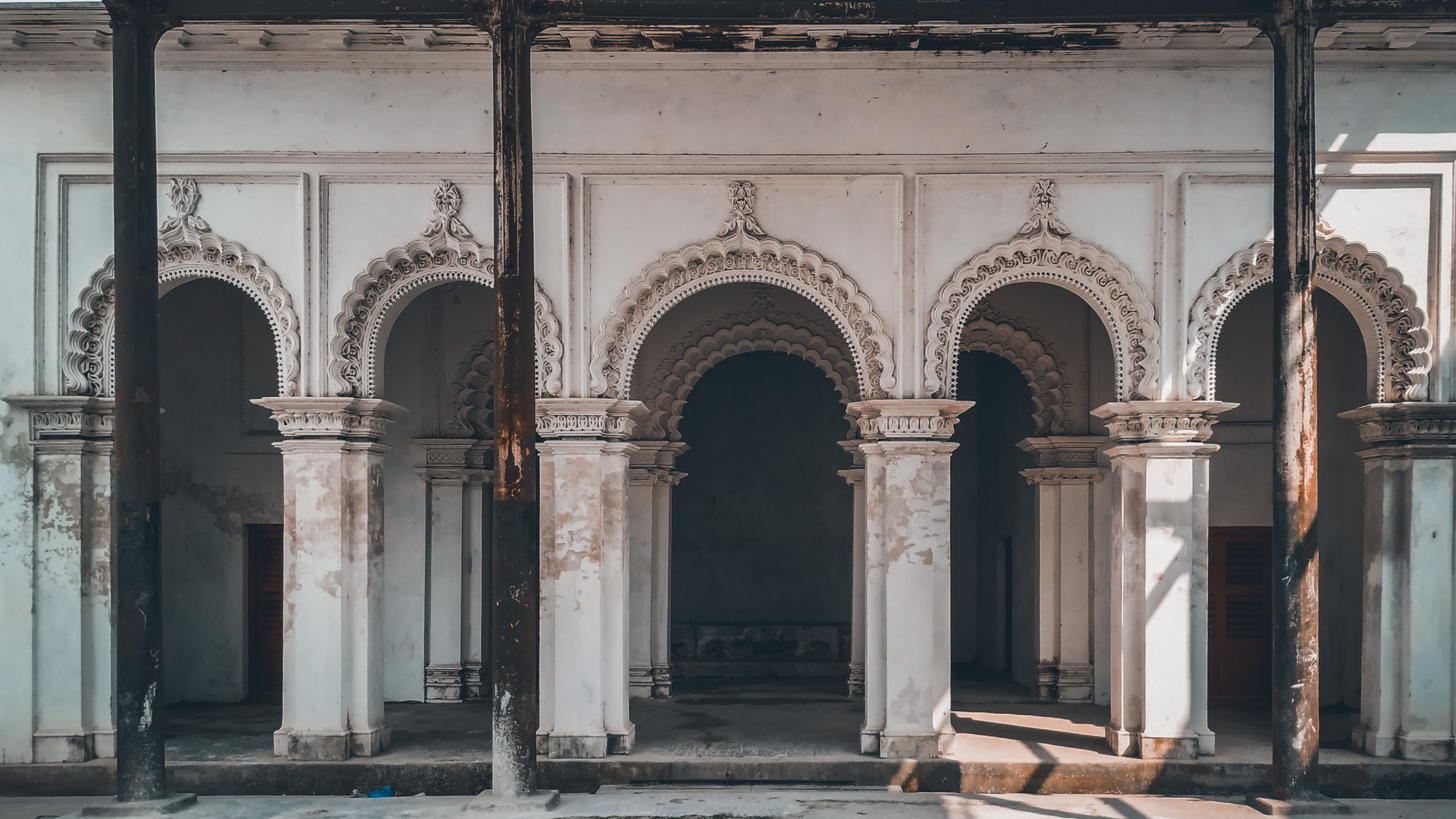

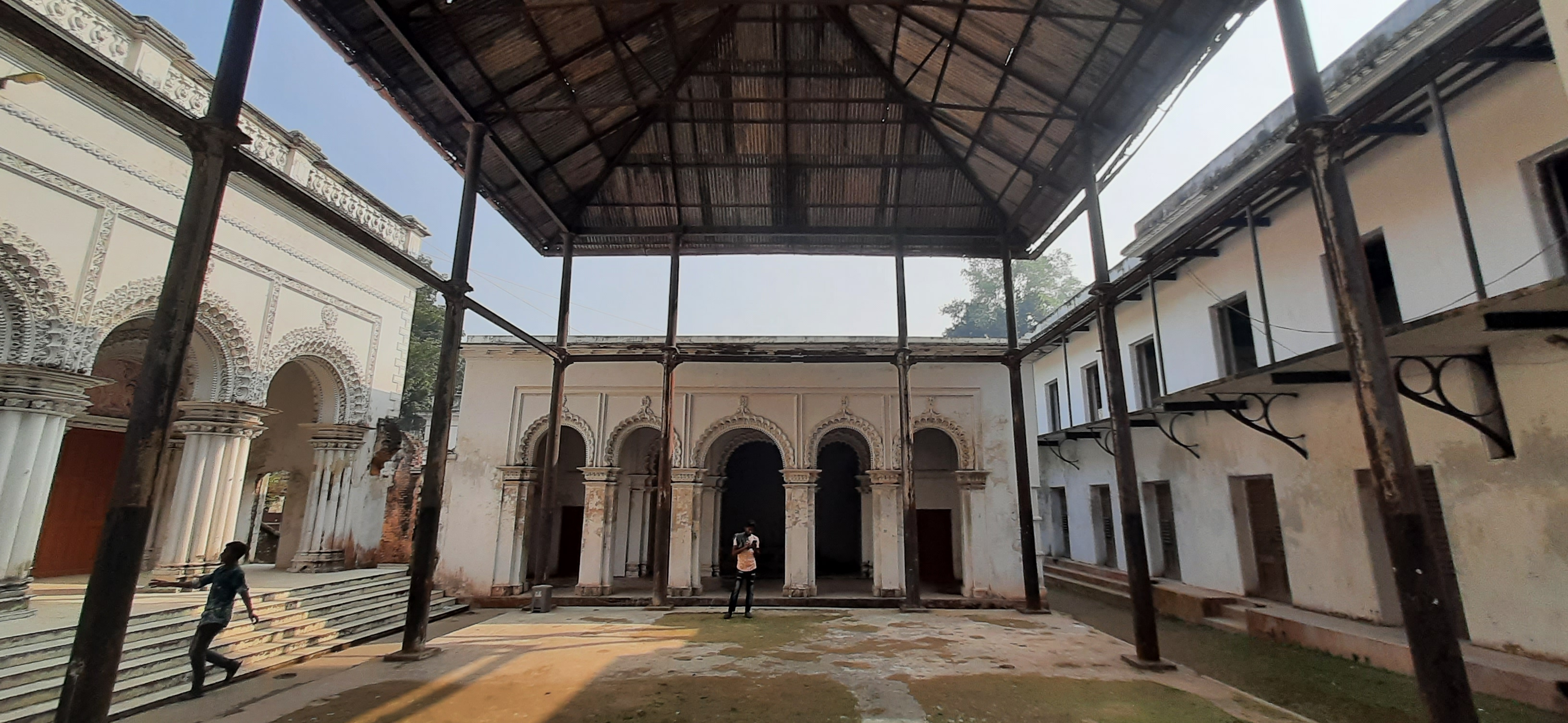

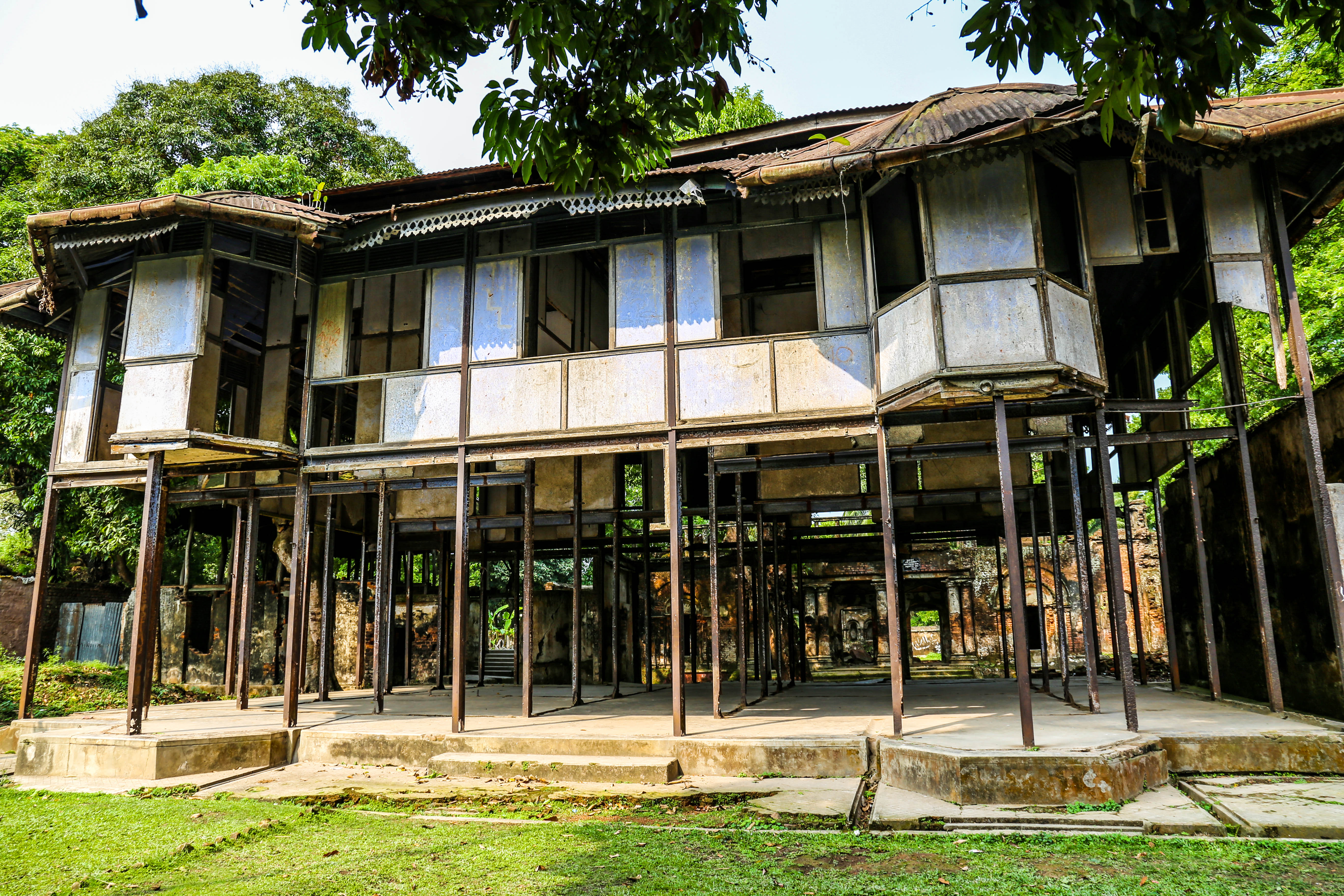

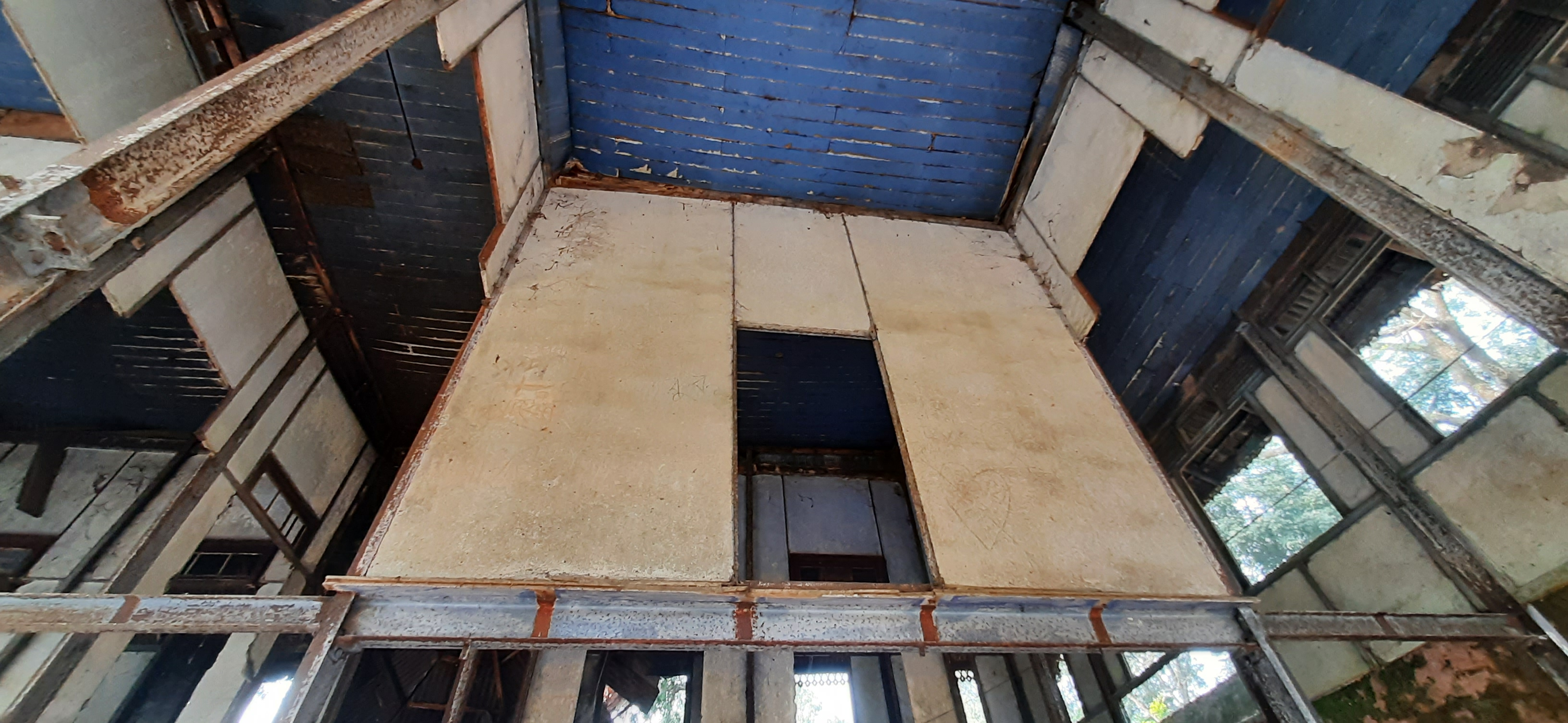

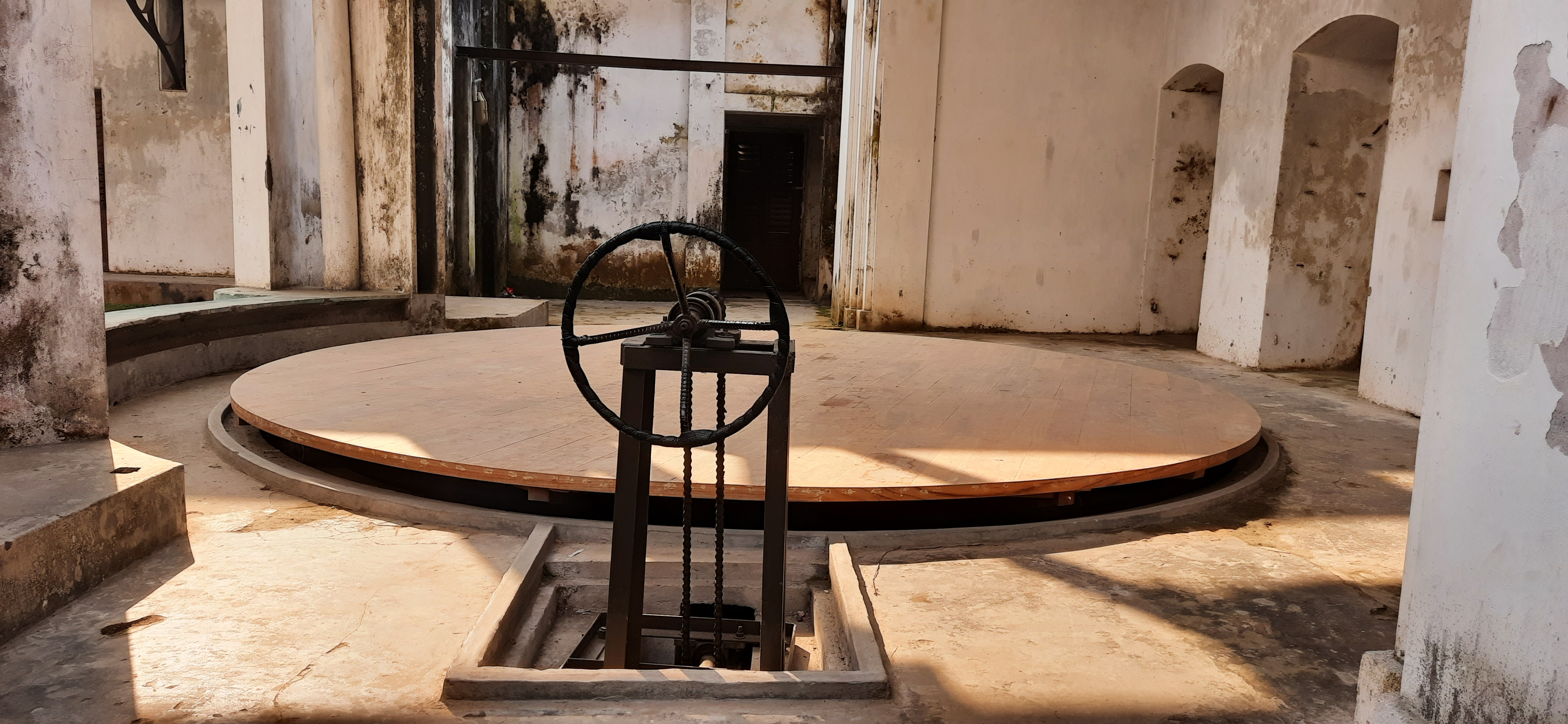

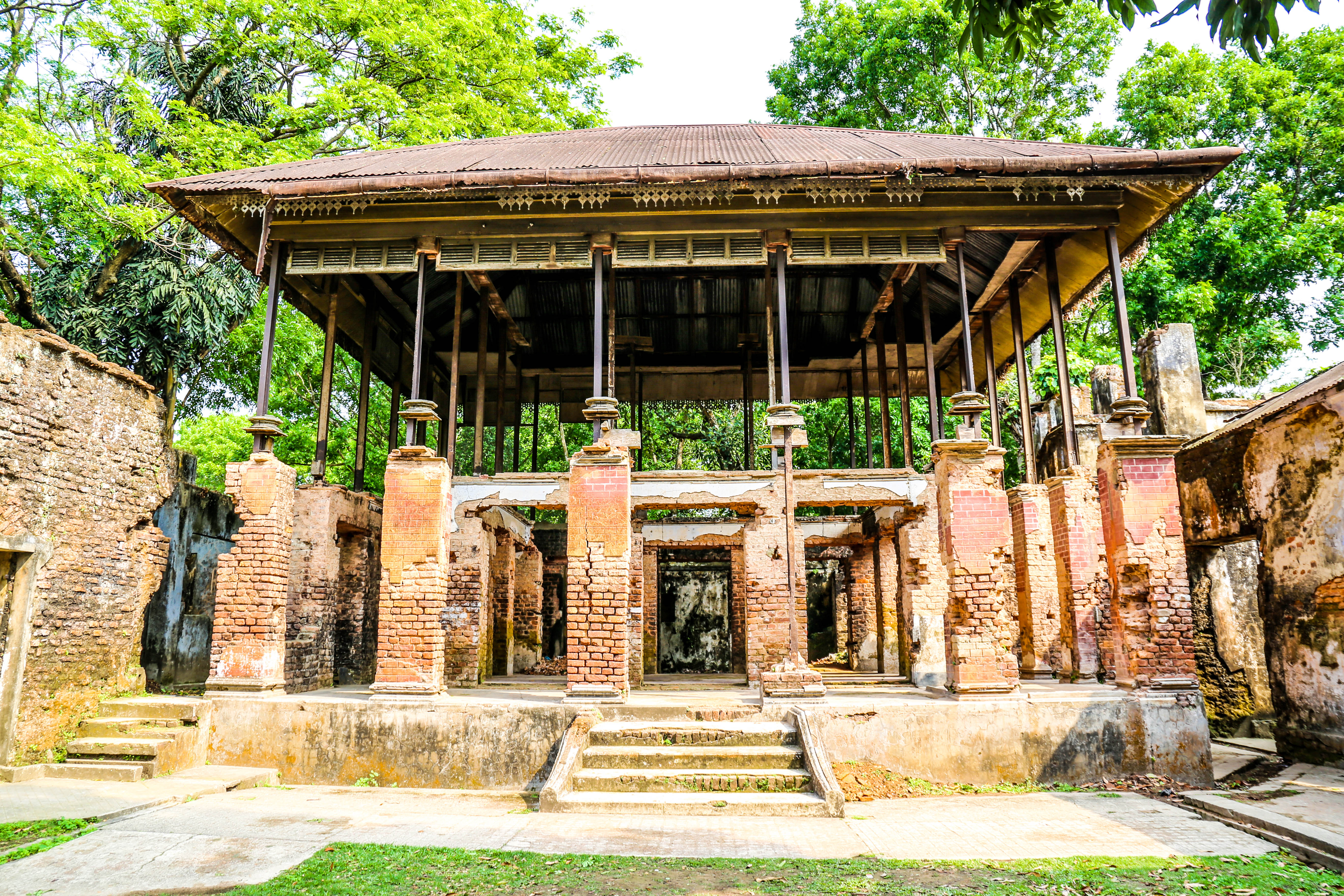

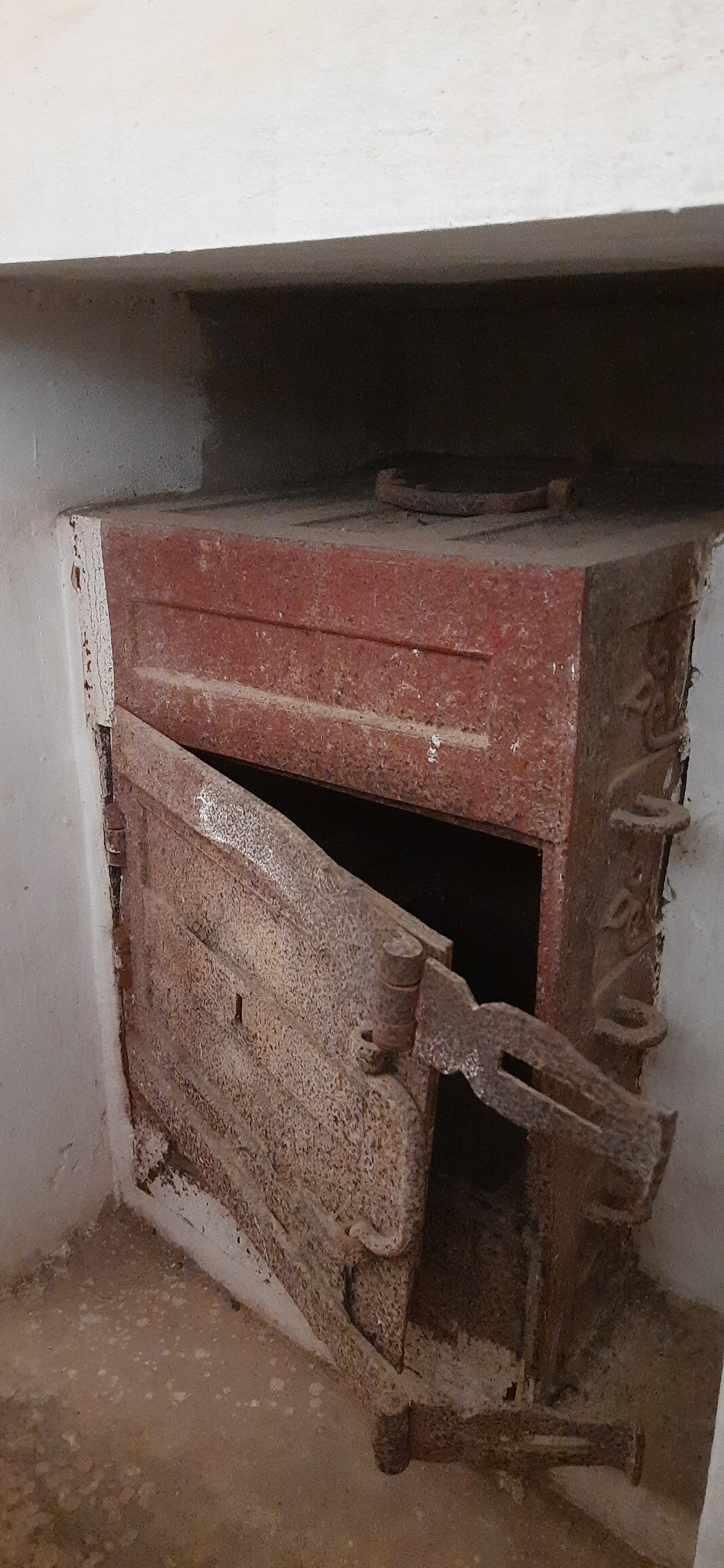

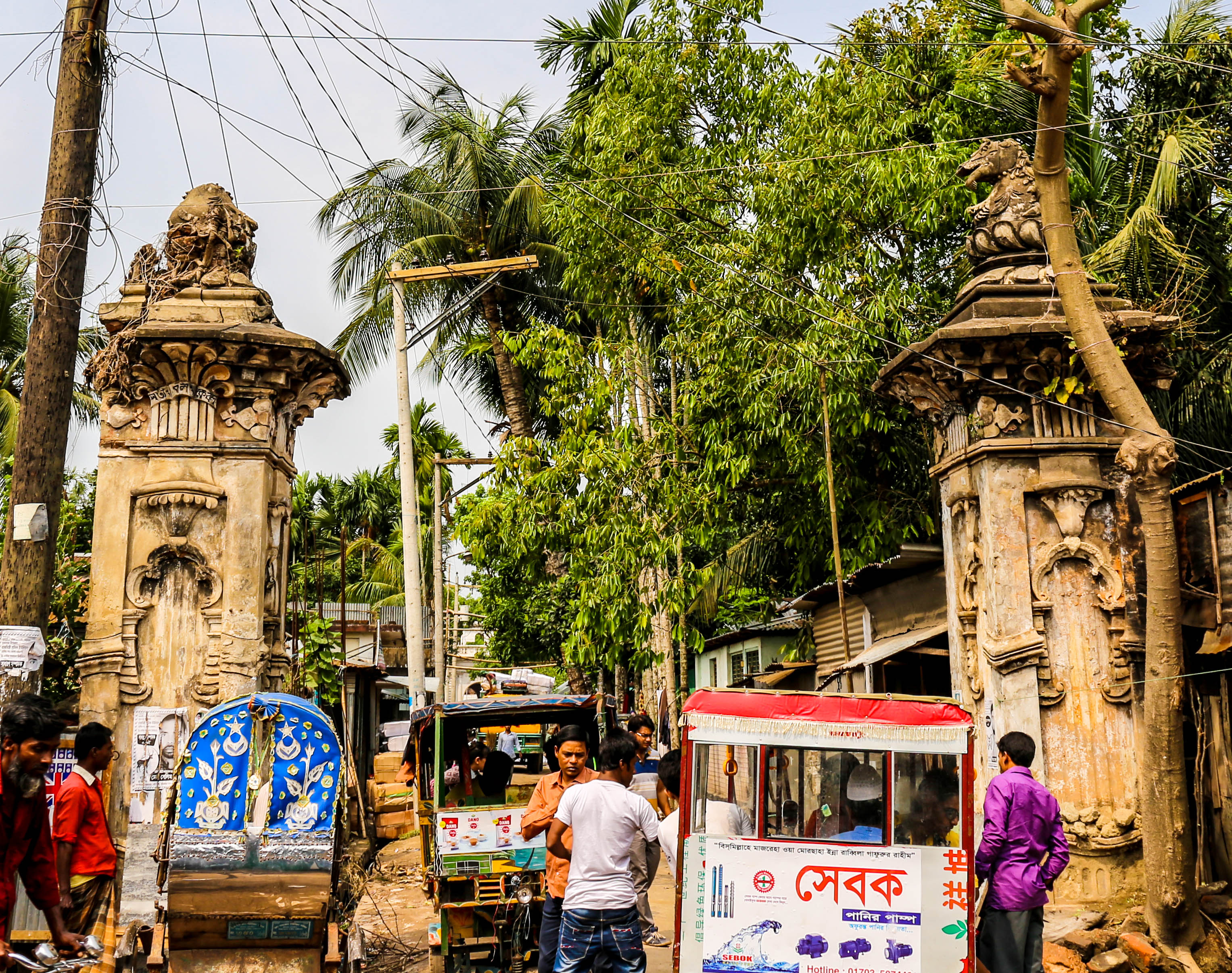

== See also ==
- List of archaeological sites in Bangladesh
