= Govt. Shahid Smriti College =

- Type: Public
- Established: 1967
- Affiliations: National University, Bangladesh
- Principal: Professor Md. Safir Uddin Chowdhury
- Students: 10,000
- Location: Mymensingh Division, Bangladesh; 23.1668°N 89.1989°E
- Campus: City
- Website: gsscollege.gov.bd

Govt. Shahid Smriti College is a post-graduate educational institution located in Muktagachha in the Mymensingh Division of Bangladesh.

== History ==
Shaheed Smriti Government College is in Muktagachha upazila of Mymensingh district. The college was established in 1966 in a part of Muktagachha Rajbari Bhavan. It was declared a government college in 1960. The college offers higher secondary, undergraduate (pass), and undergraduate (honors) courses. The college enrolls 10 thousand students.

== Curriculum ==
=== High school ===
- Science
- Humanities
- Business

=== Graduation (pass) ===
- 2001 – BA (Pass)
- 6002 – BSc (Pass)
- 2004 – BBS (Pass)

=== Graduation (honors) ===
- 1001 – Bengali
- 1101 – English
- 1901 – Political science
- 2101 – Social
- 2020 – Economy
- 2501 – Accounting
- 2601 – Management

=== Master's final courses ===
10-Bengali 19-Political Science 26-Management
