= Muktagachha =

Muktagachha মুক্তাগাছা
- Town and Municipality
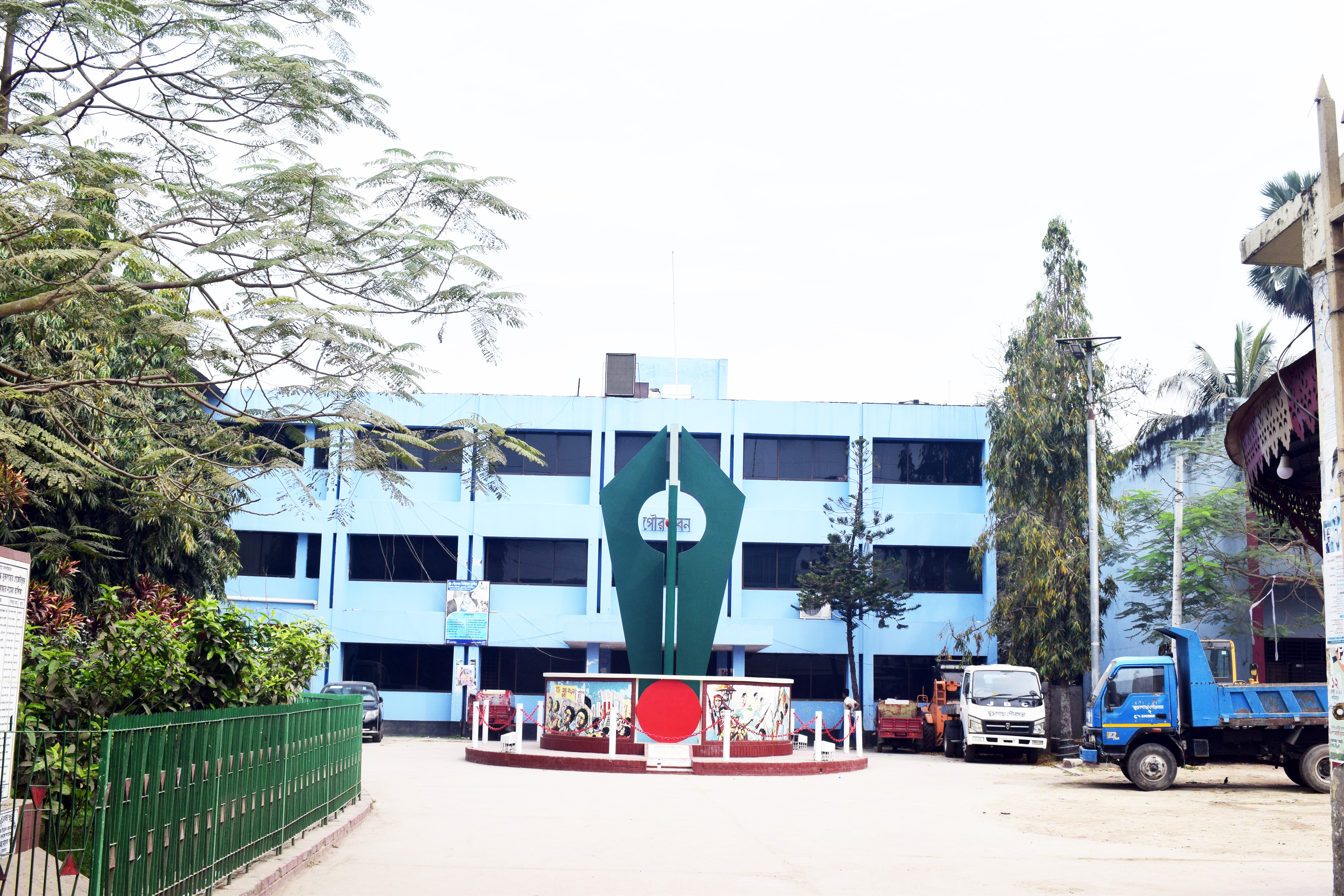
- Muktagachha municipality building

- Location of Muktagachha town in Mymensingh division Location of Muktagachha town in Bangladesh
- Coordinates: 24.766226°N 90.256233°E
- Country: Bangladesh
- Division: Mymensingh
- District: Mymensingh
- Upazila: Muktagachha

Government
  - Type: Municipality
  - Body: Muktagachha Municipality
  - Paura Mayor: Md. Billal Hossain Sarker

Area
  - Total: 12.6 km^{2} (4.9 sq mi)

Population (2022)
  - Total: 61,420
  - Density: 4,870/km^{2} (12,600/sq mi)
- Time zone: UTC+6 (BST)
- National calling code: +880

Muktagachha Municipality mahallah geocode map

Muktagachha is a town and municipality in Mymensingh District in the Mymensingh Division. It is the administrative centre and urban centre of Muktagachha Upazila.

== Geographical Location ==
Muktagachha is located in the western part of Mymensingh district, in Muktagachha Upazila.

== Founding period ==
Muktagacha thana was created in 1961 and the thana was converted into an upazila in 1983. Municipality 1, Ward 9, Mohalla 20, Union 10, Mauza 261, Village 273. The upazila city consists of 9 wards and 20 mohallas. Area 7•28 km. The municipality was created in 1875. The population is 37043 with males 50•63 percent and females 49•37 percent. Population density is 5088 persons per km^{2}.

== Demographics ==
Religions in Muktagachha (2011)
| Religion | Percent |
| Islam | 86.52% |
| Hinduism | 13.38% |
| Other or not stated | 0.10% |

According to the 2022 Bangladesh census, Muktagachha city had a population of 61,420 and a literacy rate of 86.05%.

According to the 2011 Bangladesh census, Muktagachha city had 11,189 households and a population of 49,915. 11,091 (22.22%) were under 10 years of age. Muktagachha had a literacy rate (age 7 and over) of 60.17%, compared to the national average of 51.8%, and a sex ratio of 987 females per 1000 males.

== Education ==
Education rate is 45.93 percent.

=== Government College 2 ===
- Govt. Shahid Smriti College
- Government Physical Education College.

=== Private Colleges (4) ===
- Muktagacha Mahavidyalaya,
- Haji Kashem Ali Women College
- Gabtali College
- Binodbari Ideal College

There are also 40 high schools, 18 madrasas, 101 government primary schools, 43 private primary schools. Ancient Educational Institutions: Ramkishore High School, Nagendra Narayan Government Primary School
