= 2024 Bangladeshi general election =

- 7 January 2024

300 of the 350 seats in the Jatiya Sangsad 151 seats needed for a majority
- Registered: 119,691,633
- Turnout: 41.8% (disputed; (Note: Independent sources reported 28% turnout.) ▼39.4pp)
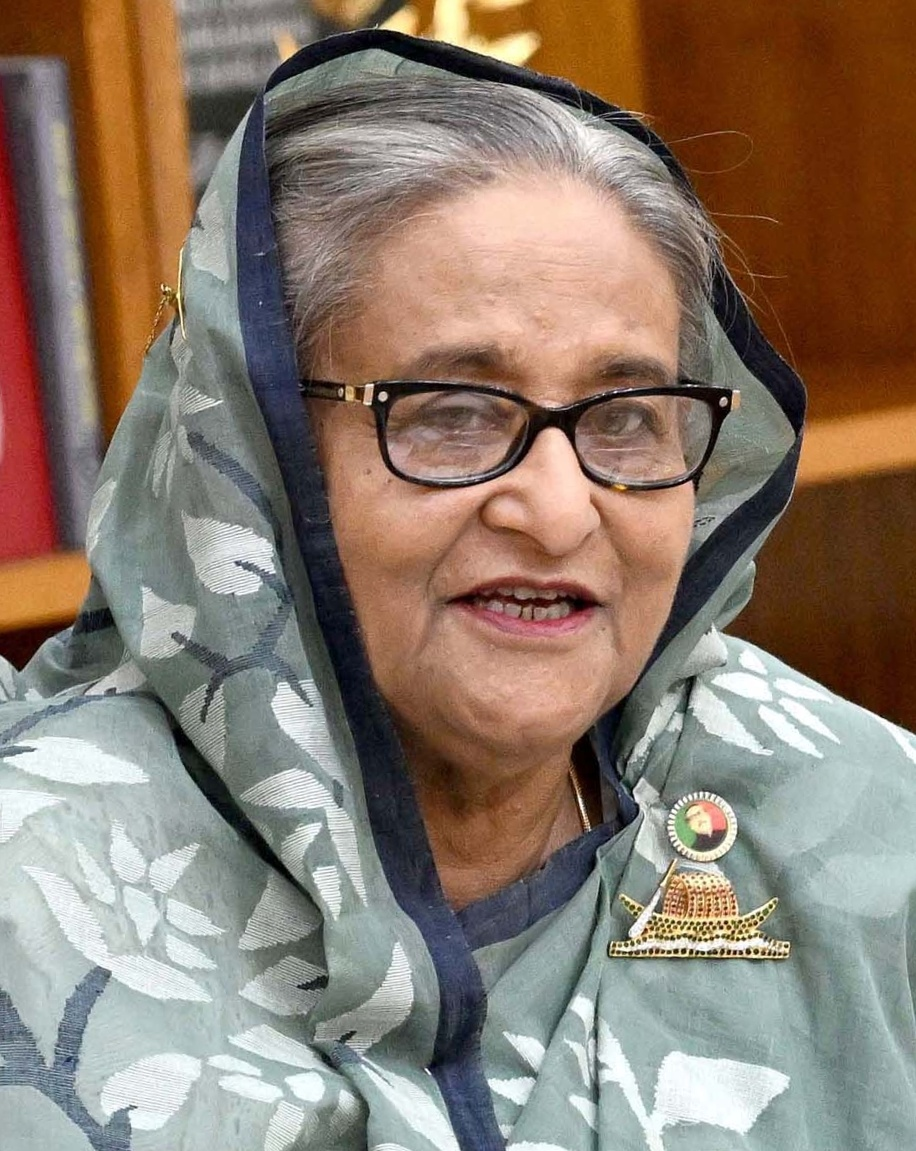

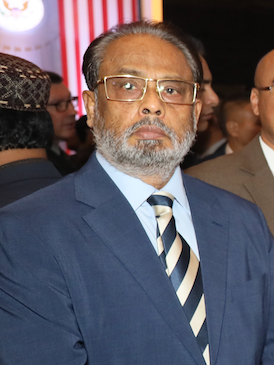
	First party	Second party
Leader	Sheikh Hasina	GM Quader
Party	AL	JP(E)
Leader's seat	Gopalganj-3 (won)	Rangpur-3 (won)
Last election	74.96%, 257 seats	5.22%, 24 seats
Seats won	224	11
Seat change	▼33	▼13
Popular vote	32,113,540	2,179,673
Percentage	65.15%	4.42%
Swing	▼9.81pp	▼0.80pp
- Results by constituency
Prime Minister before election
Sheikh Hasina
AL
Prime Minister after election
Sheikh Hasina
AL

General elections were held in Bangladesh on 7 January 2024 in accordance with the constitutional requirement, stating that elections must take place within the 90-day period before the expiration of the current term of the Jatiya Sangsad on 29 January 2024. The Awami League, led by incumbent Sheikh Hasina, won the election for the fourth consecutive time with less than 40% of the eligible voters voting according to an Election Commission, which was run by the ruling political party. The party won 224 seats while independent candidates, most of whom were Awami League members propped up as dummy candidates to give a semblance of competition, won 62 seats.

In the lead-up to the election, the incumbent government led by Sheikh Hasina cracked down on opposition parties and silenced critics of the government. Hasina's prime ministership has been described as authoritarian since being re-elected in 2008, and in 2011 removed the requirement that a temporary independent caretaker government be formed to hold elections. The main opposition party, the Bangladesh Nationalist Party, boycotted the elections (as they did in 2014) as they assumed that the election commission under the incumbent government were unable to organise a free and fair election.

A protest over the election turnout emerged as the Chief Election Commissioner initially claimed, based on the data at hand, that turnout was 28%, but later retracted that statement to claim turnout was around 40%.

The United States Department of State, in a statement, said that the election "was not free and fair" and the UK's Foreign, Commonwealth and Development Office termed the election "lacking the preconditions of democracy." According to The Economist, through this election, Bangladesh "effectively became a one-party state."

On 5 August 2024, Sheikh Hasina fled the country, facing a widespread student protest that turned into a national uprising against her rule. The movement succeeded and the 12th Jatiya Sangsad was dissolved. An interim government headed by Muhammad Yunus took charge as per the demand of the students. Both Sheikh Hasina (by virtue of being sentenced to death) and her party are barred from running in the 2026 election.

== Schedule ==
Poll Event	Schedule
Declaration of the schedule	15 November 2023
Application deadline for candidates	30 November 2023
Scrutiny of nomination	1–4 December 2023
Last Date for Withdrawal of nomination	17 December 2023
Symbol allocation	18 December 2023
Start of campaign period	18 December 2023
End of campaign period	5 January 2024
Date of Poll	7 January 2024
Date of Counting of Votes	7 January 2024
Date of reserved seats Poll	14 March 2024

== Background ==
The Awami League won the 2018 general elections and formed the government. The first session of the parliament sat on 30 January 2019. As the tenure of a parliament lasts five years in Bangladesh, the Sangsad was scheduled to expire on 29 January 2024.

The main opposition party, the Bangladesh Nationalist Party (BNP), demanded that the government hand over power to a neutral caretaker government before the next elections. This has been rejected by Prime Minister Sheikh Hasina, who vowed that "Bangladesh will never allow an unelected government again". Hasina's resistance to a caretaker government arose following the 2006–2008 crisis, during which a caretaker government assumed military control of the country and arrested a number of political leaders, including Hasina and BNP leader Khaleda Zia. Zia was sentenced to prison for five years on 8 February 2018, for her involvement in the Zia Orphanage corruption case. The sentence was then modified to 10 years. Khaleda Zia's successor as chair of the party, her son Tarique Rahman, was also found guilty of criminal conspiracy and multiple counts of murder for a grenade attack in 2004 that injured Hasina and killed 24 people. He was sentenced to life in prison. As such, he was barred from running for office.

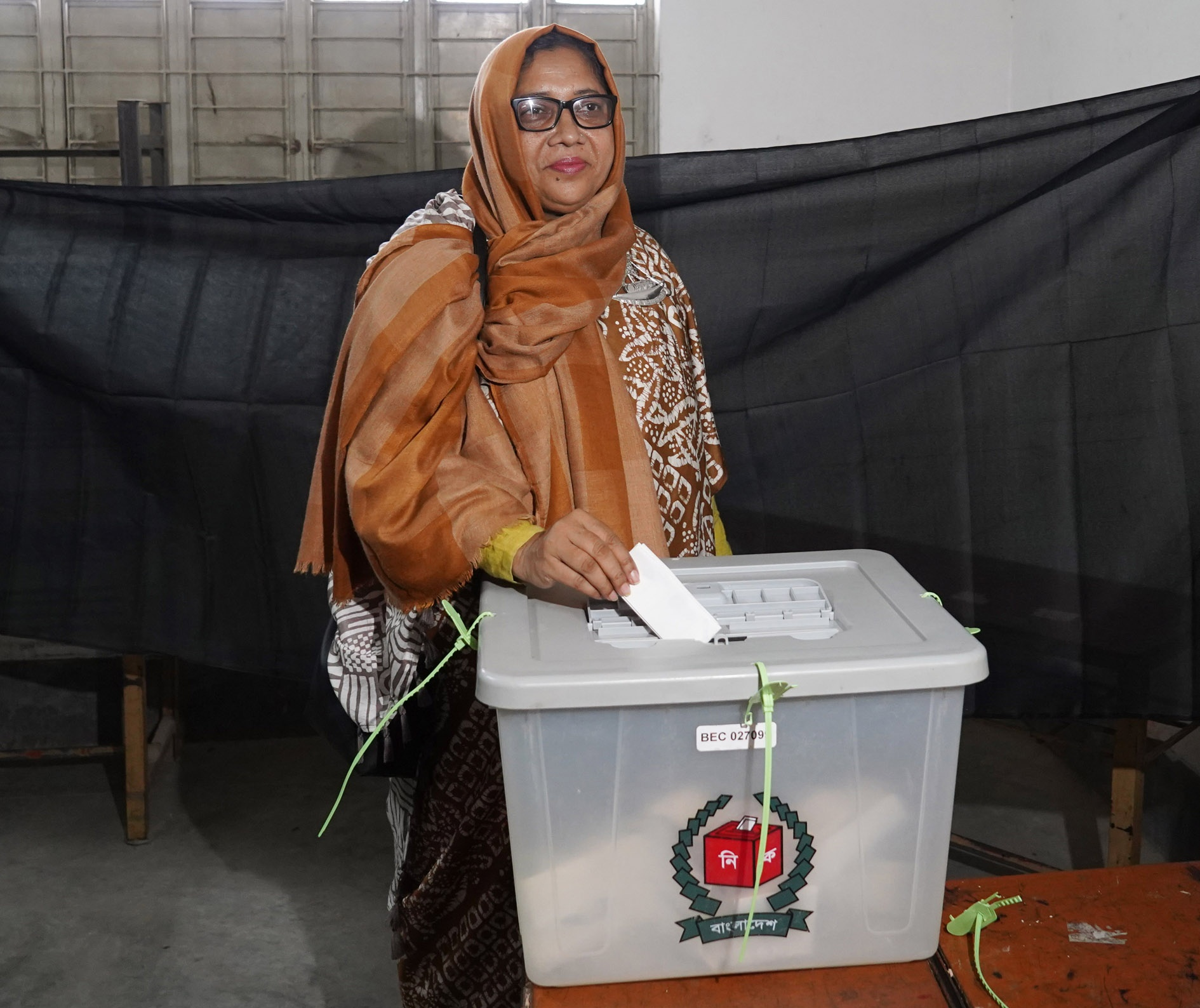
A female voter from Dhaka

In order to guarantee that the election will be conducted in accordance with electoral law and the constitution, the 2024 Bangladesh Election Commission was formed on 27 February 2022. It is responsible for announcing election schedules, outlining constituency zones, preparing electoral rolls, supervising the elections, announcing the election's results, and establishing election boards to settle any election disputes. It is chaired by Kazi Habibul Awal, Md. Alamgir, Anisur Rahman, Rashida Sultana Emily and Ahsan Habib Khan.

In the election, President Mohammed Shahabuddin and first lady Rebecca Sultana used a postal ballot to cast their vote on 3 January 2024. It is the first instances of using postal ballot in the history of elections in Bangladesh.

== Electoral system ==
The 350 members of the Jatiya Sangsad consist of 300 directly elected seats using first-past-the-post voting in single-member constituencies, and an additional 50 seats reserved for women. The reserved seats are selected by the elected constituency members via the single transferable vote. Each parliament sits for a five-year term.

=== Criticism ===
The electoral system has been criticised as disproportional and a key driver of political deadlock in the country.

== Pre-electoral statistics and information ==
According to the data released by the Election Commission on 4 January 2024, the total number of voters in the next parliamentary election is 119,689,289 people. Among them, 60,769,741 are men voters, 58,918,699 are women voters and 849 hijra voters. According to EC, 28 political parties and a total of 1,970 candidates are contesting the election, of which 436 are independent candidates. Total final polling centres are 42,148 and final polling booths are 261,564.

== Controversies ==
The BNP has demanded that there should be a caretaker government during election season because, as Citizens for Good Governance founder-secretary Badiul Alam Majumder has claimed, every election in Bangladesh that was not conducted under a caretaker government has been marred by irregularities. Without a caretaker government, the BNP has stated its intent to boycott the elections. On 17 May 2023, BNP standing committee member Amir Khasru Mahmud Chowdhury said: "[Our] movement and elections cannot go hand in hand. Participating in elections under [the current government] means to validate them. We cannot continue our movement with those who compete in the elections when the leaders and activists are being arrested and harassed while protesting to free the country from this illegal government. Rather, it is time to identify them and uproot them politically." On 3 June 2023, the BNP expelled 43 of its leaders for life as a result of their decision to participate in the Sylhet City Corporation election.

Jamaat-e-Islami was banned from participating in elections in 2013, and many of its former leaders have gone on to form the Bangladesh Development Party (BDP), which intends to participate in the elections. The president of the BDP, Anwarul Islam Chan, has denied any affiliations with the Jamaat, saying: "The post-liberation generation was born after independence. We are a political party and not interested in such issues" as opposing Bangladesh's independence from Pakistan.

The Awami League, on the other hand, has insisted that a caretaker government would be unconstitutional and that the Election Commission is independent and sanctioned by law.

The Bangladeshi Ministry of Foreign Affairs asserted "the electoral process will remain under strict vigilance, including by international observers as accredited by the Election Commission." Bangladesh Foreign Minister Dr. AK Abdul Momen said on 10 April 2023, in a meeting with US Secretary of State Antony Blinken that the independent election commission is key to holding fair, transparent elections.

== Foreign positions ==
=== United States ===
On 23 May 2023, U.S. Secretary of State Antony Blinken announced a new visa policy vis-a-vis Bangladesh to support the country's goal of holding free, fair, and peaceful national elections. The policy states that the US would "restrict the issuance of visas for any Bangladeshi individual, believed to be responsible for, or complicit in, undermining the democratic election process in Bangladesh", including "current and former Bangladeshi officials, members of pro-government and opposition political parties, and members of law enforcement, the judiciary, and security services". The policy lists actions that would undermine the election process as "vote rigging, voter intimidation, the use of violence to prevent people from exercising their right to freedoms of association and peaceful assembly, and the use of measures designed to prevent political parties, voters, civil society, or the media from disseminating their views".

The restrictions were meant to act as a signal to the Bangladeshi government to hold democratic elections and to the BNP to participate in the elections, as a boycott of them could lead to instability. When asked how the US would navigate a situation in which a party that refuses to participate in the national election would later claim that the election was unfair, US State Department Principal Deputy Spokesperson Vedant Patel said: "I don't have anything else to get into, as it's an internal, domestic election" and that all the US wants is that it should be free, fair, and reflective of the will of the Bangladeshi people.

On 1 August 2023, US Ambassador Peter Haas announced after meeting with Chief Election Commissioner Kazi Habibul Awal that a US pre-election monitoring team consisting of experts with previous experience in election monitoring and preparation, would arrive in Bangladesh in October before the election which was subsequently cancelled.

=== United Nations ===
On 4 August 2023, the United Nations denounced pre-election violence in Bangladesh, calling for police "to refrain from excessive use of force amid recurring violence and mass arrests ahead of general elections". This is a human rights issue concerning violence erupting at opposition rallies in 2023, and the harsh response by police using rubber bullets, tear gas and water cannons. A UN spokesman said: "Police, alongside men in plain clothing, have been seen using hammers, sticks, bats and iron rods, among other objects, to beat protesters". He added that hundreds of people who oppose the government have been arrested before and during the rallies.

UN concerns have arisen after Sheikh Hasina rejected demands by the BNP and its allies for the government to step down and allow the January election to be held under a neutral caretaker government. The UN has stressed that Hasina's government "must abide by their human rights obligations and allow people to exercise their rights to freedom of peaceful assembly and freedom of opinion and expression".

Responding to the UN statement, Mahfuz Anam commented: "From the looks of it, our two major political parties are preparing for 'gladiatorial' street fights as a part of their election preparation. Can this be democracy?" Later, on 4 August, Information Minister Hasan Mahmud attacked the BNP during a mosquito eradication conference in Dhaka, saying: "Dengue mosquitoes bite people and BNP puts people on fire and burns cars. Therefore, like dengue, BNP has to be prevented".

Soon after Mahfuz Anam spoke, there was a meeting in Dhaka of the 14-party alliance led by the Awami League. They announced a rally to be held on 7 August before Awami League HQ on Bangabandhu Avenue. The purpose of the rally is to protest against the "terror and anarchy" of BNP and to "prevent any conspiracy of the BNP-Jamaat". A spokesman said alliance members will take to the streets across the whole country, besides Dhaka.

=== Others ===
On 7 May 2023, Prime Minister Sheikh Hasina urged Commonwealth Secretary-General Patricia Scotland to send diversified election observers for the election while stating that her government has made the election commission an independent and powerful institution to strengthen the democratic process in the country.

A group of human rights organizations wrote to 14 members of United States Congress urging them to be aware of how the BNP and Jamaat-e-Islami have been operating "overtly and covertly in cahoots with terrorist groups, like Ansar al Islam, since 2001".

Terry Isley, a member of an independent election monitoring delegation that visited Bangladesh in August 2023, said that the demand for a caretaker government is unconstitutional and illegal in the present political context of Bangladesh. He also expressed disappointment that the BNP refused to meet with the delegation.

On 20 September 2023, the Election Commission of Bangladesh received a letter from the European Union stating that it would not send a full-fledged election observation mission to the upcoming general election. The letter said Bangladesh's environment is not suitable for election observation. However, in a letter to the Election Commission on 19 October the EU said it would send a 4-member technical team to observe the election.

== Parties and alliances ==
Alliance/Party		Flag	Leader	Seats Contested	Seats Contested under Alliance	
Grand Alliance	AL		Sheikh Hasina	263	263	269
Grand Alliance	WPB		Rashed Khan Menon	33	2	269
Grand Alliance	JaSaD		Hasanul Haque Inu	91	3	269
Grand Alliance	BTF		Syed Najibul Bashar Maizbhandari	41	0	269
Grand Alliance	JP (M)		Anwar Hossain Manju	20	1	269
Grand Alliance	BSD-ML		Dilip Barua	6	0	269
JP (E)			GM Quader	286		
TBNP			Shamsher Mobin Chowdhury	151		
UF	BKP		Syed Muhammad Ibrahim	20	20	38
UF	BJP		Mohammed Abdul Muqit	13	13	38
UF	BML (B)		Sheikh Zulfiqar Bulbul Chowdhury	5	5	38
BNM			Abdur Rahman	49		
BSP			Sayed Saifuddin Ahmed	82		
BIF			M.A. Matin	37		
BML			Badruddoza Ahmed Shuja	2		
IFB			Bahadur Shah Mujaddedi	39		
ZP			Mustafa Amir Faisal	218		
IOJ			Abu Hasnat Amini	45		
BKA			Mawlana Ataullah	14		
BKSJL			Kader Siddique	34		
GF			Jakir Hossain	25		
GF			Kamal Hossain	9		
NPP			Sheikh Salauddin Salu	142		
BDNAP			Jobel Rahman Gani	6		
BDB		Bikalpadhara Bangladesh	A. Q. M. Badruddoza Chowdhury	14		
BSM			Abdur Razzak Mullah	74		
BNF			M.A. Abul Kalam Azad	55		
BCP			Kazi Rezaul Hossen	116		

== Candidates ==
Few terms used in the following table are described as-

- Nomination Withdrawn means candidates withdrew their nomination before or on 17 December.
- Candidacy Invalid means candidates who are declared ineligible to contest by the EC.
- Disqualified means disqualification of eligible candidates due to inappropriate nomination submission.
- Candidacy Withdrawn means candidates who are on the final list or on ballot but won't be contesting or endorsed another candidate.
- Candidacy Cancelled means cancellation of candidacy of the candidates who are on ballot due to breaking election code.
- Didn't Submit Nomination Paper means candidates were nominated by the party but failed to submit their nomination paper on due date.

Parliamentary Constituency		Grand Alliance		Jatiya Party (Ershad)		Third Party (Note: significant candidates)	
#	Name	Party	Candidate	Party	Candidate	Party	Candidate
Rangpur Division
1	Panchagarh-1	AL	Naimuzzaman Bhuiyan	JP(E)	Disqualified	Independent	Md. Anwar Sadat
2	Panchagarh-2	AL	Md. Nurul Islam Sujon	JP(E)	Lutfar Rahman Ripon	TBNP	Md. Abdul Aziz
3	Thakurgaon-1	AL	Ramesh Chandra Sen	JP(E)	Md. Rezaul Razi Swapan Chowdhury	IOJ	Md. Rofikul Islam
4	Thakurgaon-2	AL	Mazharul Islam Suzon	JP(E)	Nurunnahar Begum		
5	Thakurgaon-3	AL	Nomination Withdrawn	JP(E)	Hafiz Uddin Ahmed		
6	Dinajpur-1	AL	Manoranjan Shill Gopal	JP(E)	Md. Shahinur Islam		
7	Dinajpur-2	AL	Khalid Mahmud Chowdhury	JP(E)	Candidacy Withdrawn		
8	Dinajpur-3	AL	Iqbalur Rahim	JP(E)	Ahmed Shafi Rubel		
9	Dinajpur-4	AL	Abul Hassan Mahmood Ali	JP(E)	Md. Monajat Chowdhury		
10	Dinajpur-5	AL	Mostafizur Rahman	JP(E)	Nurul Islam		
11	Dinajpur-6	AL	Shibli Sadique	JP(E)	Md. Feroze Sultan Alam		
12	Nilphamari-1	AL	Aftab Uddin Sarkar	JP(E)	Lt Col. (Retd.) Taslim		
13	Nilphamari-2	AL	Asaduzzaman Noor	JP(E)	Md. Shahjahan Ali Chowdhury		
14	Nilphamari-3	AL	Nomination Withdrawn	JP(E)	Rana Mohammad Sohail		
15	Nilphamari-4	AL	Nomination Withdrawn	JP(E)	Ahsan Adelur Rahman		
16	Lalmonirhat-1	AL	Md Motahar Hossain	JP(E)	Md. Habibul Haque Bashu Mia		
17	Lalmonirhat-2	AL	Nuruzzaman Ahmed	JP(E)	Md. Delwar		
18	Lalmonirhat-3	AL	Md Motiyar Rahman	JP(E)	Zahid Hasan		
19	Rangpur-1	AL	Nomination Withdrawn	JP(E)	HM Shahriar Asif	Independent	Mashiur Rahaman Ranga
20	Rangpur-2	AL	A.K.M. Ahsanul Haque Chowdhury	JP(E)	Anisul Islam Mondal		
21	Rangpur-3	AL	Nomination Withdrawn	JP(E)	GM Quader		
22	Rangpur-4	AL	Tipu Munshi	JP(E)	Mustafa Salim Bengal		
23	Rangpur-5	AL	Rashek Rahman	JP(E)	Md. Anishur Rahman		
24	Rangpur-6	AL	Shirin Sharmin Chaudhury	JP(E)	Md. Noor Alam Mia		
25	Kurigram-1	AL	Nomination Withdrawn	JP(E)	A.K.M Mostafizur Rahman		
26	Kurigram-2	AL	Nomination Withdrawn	JP(E)	Panir Uddin Ahmed		
27	Kurigram-3	AL	Soumendra Prasad Pandey	JP(E)	Abdus Subhan		
28	Kurigram-4	AL	Md Biplab Hasan	JP(E)	AKM Saifur Rahman		
29	Gaibandha-1	AL	Nomination Withdrawn	JP(E)	Shamim Haider Patwary		
30	Gaibandha-2	AL	Nomination Withdrawn	JP(E)	Abdur Rashid Sarkar		
31	Gaibandha-3	AL	Umme Kulsum Smrity	JP(E)	Engineer Mainur Rabbi Chowdhury		
32	Gaibandha-4	AL	Abul Kalam Azad	JP(E)	Md Moshiur Rahman		
33	Gaibandha-5	AL	Mahmud Hasan Ripon	JP(E)	Ataur Rahman Sarkar		
Rajshahi Division
34	Joypurhat-1	AL	Shamsul Alam Dudu	JP(E)	Md. Moazzem Hossain		
35	Joypurhat-2	AL	Abu Sayeed Al Mahmood Swapon	JP(E)	Abu Saeed Nurullah		
36	Bogra-1	AL	Shahadara Mannan	JP(E)	Md. Golam Mustafa Babu		
37	Bogra-2	AL	Nomination Withdrawn	JP(E)	Shariful Islam Jinnah		
38	Bogra-3	AL	Nomination Withdrawn	JP(E)	Nurul Islam Talukder		
39	Bogra-4	JSD	A. K. M. Rezaul Karim Tansen	JP(E)	Shahin Mustafa Kamal Faruk	BCP	Ashraful Alom
40	Bogra-5	AL	Majibur Rahman Majnu	JP(E)	Md. Omar Faruk		
41	Bogra-6	AL	Ragebul Ahsan Ripu	JP(E)	Aziz Ahmed Rubel		
42	Bogra-7	AL	Mostafa Alam	JP(E)	ATM Anisul Islam	Independent	Rezaul Karim Bablu
43	Chapai Nawabganj-1	AL	Shamil Uddin Ahmed Shimul	JP(E)	Md. Afzar Hosen		
44	Chapai Nawabganj-2	AL	Md. Ziaur Rahman	JP(E)	Abdur Rashid		
45	Chapai Nawabganj-3	AL	Md. Abdul Odud	JP(E)	Candidacy Invalid		
46	Naogaon-1	AL	Sadhan Chandra Majumder	JP(E)	Md. Akbar Ali		
47	Naogaon-2	AL	Md. Shahiduzzaman Sarker	JP(E)	Md. Tofazzal Hosen		
48	Naogaon-3	AL	Sourendra Nath Chakraborty	JP(E)	Masud Rana		
49	Naogaon-4	AL	Md. Nahid Morshed	JP(E)	Md. Altaf Hosen		
50	Naogaon-5	AL	Nizam Uddin Jalil	JP(E)	Md. Iftarul Islam Bokul		
51	Naogaon-6	AL	Anwar Hossain Helal	JP(E)	Abu Belal Hosen		
52	Rajshahi-1	AL	Omar Faruk Chowdhury	JP(E)	Shamsuddin Mondol	Independent	Mahiya Mahi
53	Rajshahi-2	WPB	Fazle Hossain Badhsha	JP(E)	Saiful Islam Shopon		
54	Rajshahi-3	AL	Asadujjaman Asad	JP(E)	Solaiman Hosen		
55	Rajshahi-4	AL	Abul Kalam Azad	JP(E)	Md. Abu Taleb Pramanik		
56	Rajshahi-5	AL	Abdul Wadud	JP(E)	Abul Hosen		
57	Rajshahi-6	AL	Shahriar Alam	JP(E)	Md. Shamsuddin Rintu		
58	Natore-1	AL	Shahidul Islam Bakul	JP(E)	Md. Ashik Hosen		
59	Natore-2	AL	Shafiqul Islam Shimul	JP(E)	Md. Nurunnobi Mridha		
60	Natore-3	AL	Zunaid Ahmed Palak	JP(E)	Anisur Rahman		
61	Natore-4	AL	Siddiqur Rahman Patwari	JP(E)	Md. Alauddin Mridha		
62	Sirajganj-1	AL	Tanvir Shakil Joy	JP(E)	Md. Jahirul Islam		
63	Sirajganj-2	AL	Jannat Ali Henry	JP(E)	Md. Aminul Islam Jhontu		
64	Sirajganj-3	AL	Abdul Aziz	JP(E)	Md. Jakir Hosen		
65	Sirajganj-4	AL	Shafiqul Islam	JP(E)	Md. Abdulla Al Hashem		
66	Sirajganj-5	AL	Abdul Majid Mondol	JP(E)	Md. Fazlul Haque		
67	Sirajganj-6	AL	Choyon Islam	JP(E)	Md. Moktar Hosen		
68	Pabna-1	AL	Shamsul Haque Tuku	JP(E)	Sardar Shahjahan		
69	Pabna-2	AL	Ahmed Firoz Kabir	JP(E)	Shahidul Islam Dayen	BNM	Doly Shaontoni
70	Pabna-3	AL	Md. Mokbul Hossain	JP(E)	Mir Nadir Md. Dablu		
71	Pabna-4	AL	Galibur Rahman Sherif	JP(E)	Md. Rezaul Karim		
72	Pabna-5	AL	Golam Faruk Khandker	JP(E)	Tarikul Alam Shadhin		
Khulna Division
73	Meherpur-1	AL	Farhad Hossain	JP(E)	Md. Abdul Hamid		
74	Meherpur-2	AL	Abu Saleh Md. Nazmul Haque	JP(E)	Ketab Ali		
75	Kushtia-1	AL	A. K. M Sarwar Jahan	JP(E)	Shahriar Jamil Jewel		
76	Kushtia-2	JSD	Hasanul Haq Inu	JP(E)	Shahidul Islam Faruki		
77	Kushtia-3	AL	Mahbubul Alam Hanif	JP(E)	Nafiz Ahmed Khan Titu		
78	Kushtia-4	AL	Selim Altaf George	JP(E)	Md. Ayan Uddin		
79	Chuadanga-1	AL	Solaiman Haque Joarder (Selun)	JP(E)	Candidacy Withdrawn		
80	Chuadanga-2	AL	Md. Ali Azgar	JP(E)	Candidacy Withdrawn		
81	Jhenaidah-1	AL	Abdul Hyee	JP(E)	Monika Alam		
82	Jhenaidah-2	AL	Tahjib Alam Siddique	JP(E)	Maj. (Retd.) Mahfuzur Rahman		
83	Jhenaidah-3	AL	Salahuddin Miaji	JP(E)	Md. Abdur Rahman		
84	Jhenaidah-4	AL	Md. Anwarul Azim Anar	JP(E)	Emdadul Islam Bacchu		
85	Jessore-1	AL	Sheikh Afil Uddin	JP(E)	Md. Aktaruzzaman		
86	Jessore-2	AL	Md Towhiduzzaman	JP(E)	Firoz Shah		
87	Jessore-3	AL	Kazi Nabil Ahmed	JP(E)	Md. Mahbub Alam		
88	Jessore-4	AL	Enamul Haque Babul	JP(E)	Md. Johurul Haque	Independent	Ranajit Kumar Roy
89	Jessore-5	AL	Swapan Bhattacharjee	JP(E)	M.A. Halim		
90	Jessore-6	AL	Shahin Chakladar	JP(E)	G.M. Hasan		
91	Magura-1	AL	Shakib Al Hasan	JP(E)	Md. Shirazus Sayefin Sayef		
92	Magura-2	AL	Biren Sikder	JP(E)	Md. Murad Ali		
93	Narail-1	AL	B.M. Kabirul Haque	JP(E)	Milton Mollah		
94	Narail-2	AL	Mashrafe Mortaza	JP(E)	Khandakar Fayekuzzaman Firoz		
95	Bagerhat-1	AL	Sheikh Helal Uddin	JP(E)	Md. Kamruzazaman		
96	Bagerhat-2	AL	Sheikh Sharhan Naser Tonmoy	JP(E)	Hazara Shahidul Islam		
97	Bagerhat-3	AL	Habibun Nahar	JP(E)	Md. Moniruzzaman Moni		
98	Bagerhat-4	AL	HM Badiuzzaman Sohag	JP(E)	Sajon Kumar Mistri		
99	Khulna-1	AL	Nani Gopal Mandal	JP(E)	Kazi Hasanur Roshid		
100	Khulna-2	AL	Sheikh Salahuddin Jewel	JP(E)	Gausul Azam		
101	Khulna-3	AL	SM Kamal Hossain	JP(E)	Abdullah Al Mamun		
102	Khulna-4	AL	Abdus Salam Murshedi	JP(E)	Md. Farhad Ahmed		
103	Khulna-5	AL	Narayon Chandra Chanda	JP(E)	Md. Shahid Alam		
104	Khulna-6	AL	Md. Roshiduzzaman	JP(E)	Md. Shofikul Islam Modhu		
105	Satkhira-1	AL	Firoz Ahmed Swapan	JP(E)	Sayed Didar Bakht		
106	Satkhira-2	AL	Nomination Withdrawn	JP(E)	Md. Ashrafuzzaman Ashu		
107	Satkhira-3	AL	A.F.M. Ruhal Haque	JP(E)	Md. Alif Hossain		
108	Satkhira-4	AL	S.M. Ataul Haque	JP(E)	Md. Mahobubur Rahman		
Barisal Division
109	Barguna-1	AL	Dhirendra Debnath Shambhu	JP(E)	Candidacy Withdrawn		
110	Barguna-2	AL	Sultana Nadira	JP(E)	Mizanur Rahman		
111	Patuakhali-1	AL	Nomination Withdrawn	JP(E)	A.B.M. Ruhul Amin Howlader		
112	Patuakhali-2	AL	A. S. M. Feroz	JP(E)	Md. Mohsin Howlader		
113	Patuakhali-3	AL	SM Shahjada	JP(E)	Md. Nazrul Islam		
114	Patuakhali-4	AL	Muhibur Rahman Muhib	JP(E)	Abdul Mannan Howlader		
115	Bhola-1	AL	Tofail Ahmed	JP(E)	Shahjahan Mia		
116	Bhola-2	AL	Ali Azam	JP(E)	Candidacy Invalid		
117	Bhola-3	AL	Nurunnabi Chowdhury	JP(E)	Md. Kamal Uddin		
118	Bhola-4	AL	Abdullah Al Islam Jacob	JP(E)	Md. Mizanur Rahman		
119	Barisal-1	AL	Abul Hasnat Abdullah	JP(E)	Sirniabat Sekandar Ali		
120	Barisal-2	WPB	Rashed Khan Menon	JP(E)	Candidacy Withdrawn		
121	Barisal-3	AL	Nomination Withdrawn	JP(E)	Golam Kibria Tipu		
122	Barisal-4	AL	Candidacy Invalid	JP(E)	Md. Mizanur Rahman	Independent	Pankaj Nath
123	Barisal-5	AL	Zahid Faruk	JP(E)	Candidacy Withdrawn		
124	Barisal-6	AL	Abdul Hafiz Mallick	JP(E)	Nasreen Jahan Ratna		
125	Jhalokati-1	AL	Shahjahan Omar	JP(E)	Md Ejazul Haque		
126	Jhalokati-2	AL	Amir Hossain Amu	JP(E)	Md Anwar Hossain Howlader		
127	Pirojpur-1	AL	SM Rezaul Karim	JP(E)	Md. Nazrul Islam	Independent	A. K. M. A. Awal Saydur Rahman
128	Pirojpur-2	Jatiya Party (M)	Anwar Hosain Manju	JP(E)	Candidacy Invalid		
129	Pirojpur-3	AL	Nomination Withdrawn	JP(E)	Md. Mashrekul Azam Ravi		
Dhaka & Mymensingh Division
130	Tangail-1	AL	Muhammad Abdur Razzaque	JP(E)	Mohammad Ali		
131	Tangail-2	AL	Choto Monir	JP(E)	Md Humayun Kabir Talukdar		
132	Tangail-3	AL	Kamrul Hasan Khan	JP(E)	Md Abdul Halim		
133	Tangail-4	AL	Md Mozaharul Islam Talukder	JP(E)	Md Liaquat Ali	Independent	Abdul Latif Siddiqui
134	Tangail-5	AL	Md. Mamun-ur-Rashid	JP(E)	Md Mozammel Hossain		
135	Tangail-6	AL	Ahasanul Islam Titu	JP(E)	Abul Kashem		
136	Tangail-7	AL	Khan Ahmed Shuvo	JP(E)	Candidacy Withdrawn		
137	Tangail-8	AL	Anupam Shahjahan Joy	JP(E)	Md. Rezaul Karim	KSJL	Bangabir Kader Siddique
138	Jamalpur-1	AL	Noor Mohammad	JP(E)	SM Abu Sayem		
139	Jamalpur-2	AL	Md. Faridul Haq Khan	JP(E)	Mostafa al Mahmud		
140	Jamalpur-3	AL	Mirza Azam	JP(E)	Mir Shamsul Alam Lipton		
141	Jamalpur-4	AL	Mahbubur Rahman	JP(E)	Md. Abul Kalam Azad	Independent	Murad Hasan
142	Jamalpur-5	AL	Md. Abul Kalam Azad	JP(E)	Md. Zakir Hossain Khan		
143	Sherpur-1	AL	Md. Atiur Rahman Atik	JP(E)	Md. Mahmudul Haq Moni		
144	Sherpur-2	AL	Matia Chowdhury	JP(E)	-		
145	Sherpur-3	AL	A.D.M. Shahidul Islam	JP(E)	Md. Shirajul Haque		
146	Mymensingh-1	AL	Jewel Areng	JP(E)	Kajol Chandra Mahanto		
147	Mymensingh-2	AL	Sharif Ahmed	JP(E)	Md. Enayel Hossain	Independent	Shah Shahid Sarwar
14	Mymensingh-3	AL	Nilufar Anjum	JP(E)	Candidacy Withdrawn		
149	Mymensingh-4	AL	Mohammad Mohit Ur Rahman	JP(E)	-	Independent	Delwar Hossain Khan Dulu
150	Mymensingh-5	AL	Nomination Withdrawn	JP(E)	Salahuddin Ahmed Mukti		
151	Mymensingh-6	AL	Moslem Uddin	JP(E)	Mahfuzur Rahman Babul		
152	Mymensingh-7	AL	Ruhul Amin Madani	JP(E)	Md. abdul Mojid		
153	Mymensingh-8	AL	Nomination Withdrawn	JP(E)	Fakhrul Imam		
154	Mymensingh-9	AL	Abdus Salam	JP(E)	Hasmat Mahmud Tariq		
155	Mymensingh-10	AL	Fahmi Gulandaz Babel	JP(E)	Md. Najmul Haque		
156	Mymensingh-11	AL	Kazim Uddin Ahmed	JP(E)	Md. Nafiz Uddin		
157	Netrokona-1	AL	Mushtaq Ahmed Ruhi	JP(E)	Golam Rabbani		
158	Netrokona-2	AL	Ashraf Ali Khan Khasru	JP(E)	Rahima Aktar Asma Sultana		
159	Netrokona-3	AL	Ashim Kumar Ukil	JP(E)	Md. Jashim Uddin Bhuyan		
160	Netrokona-4	AL	Sajjadul Hassan	JP(E)	Liyakat Ali Khan		
161	Netrokona-5	AL	Ahmad Hossain	JP(E)	Wahizuzzaman Azad		
162	Kishoreganj-1	AL	Sayeda Zakia Noor	JP(E)	Dr. Md. Abdul Hai		
163	Kishoreganj-2	AL	Abdul Kahar Akond	JP(E)	Abu Saeed Azad Khurram Bhuiyan		
164	Kishoreganj-3	AL	Nomination Withdrawn	JP(E)	Mujibul Haque		
165	Kishoreganj-4	AL	Rejwan Ahammad Taufiq	JP(E)	Md. Abu Wahab		
166	Kishoreganj-5	AL	Md. Afzal Hossain	JP(E)	Md. Mahbubul Alam		
167	Kishoreganj-6	AL	Nazmul Hassan	JP(E)	Nurul Quader Sohail		
168	Manikganj-1	AL	Nomination Withdrawn	JP(E)	Zahirul Alam Rubel		
169	Manikganj-2	AL	Momtaz Begum	JP(E)	Candidacy Invalid		
170	Manikganj-3	AL	Zahid Maleque	JP(E)	Zahirul Alam Rubel		
171	Munshiganj-1	AL	Mohiuddin Ahmed	JP(E)	Sheikh Mohammad Sirajul Islam	BDB	Mahi B. Chowdhury
172	Munshiganj-2	AL	Sagufta Yasmin Emily	JP(E)	Md Zainal Abedin		
173	Munshiganj-3	AL	Mrinal Kanti Das	JP(E)	AFM Rafiqullah Salim		
174	Dhaka-1	AL	Salman F Rahman	JP(E)	Salma Islam		
175	Dhaka-2	AL	Qamrul Islam	JP(E)	Shakeel Ahmed		
176	Dhaka-3	AL	Nasrul Hamid	JP(E)	Md. Monir Sarkar		
177	Dhaka-4	AL	Sanjida Khanam	JP(E)	Sayed Abu Hossain		
178	Dhaka-5	AL	Harunor Rashid Munna	JP(E)	Mir Abdus Sabur Asud		
179	Dhaka-6	AL	Sayeed Khokon	JP(E)	Nomination Withdrawn		
180	Dhaka-7	AL	Mohammad Solaiman Salim	JP(E)	Tarek A Adel		
181	Dhaka-8	AL	AFM Bahauddin Nasim	JP(E)	Md Zubair Alam Khan Rabin		
182	Dhaka-9	AL	Saber Hossain Chowdhury	JP(E)	Kazi Abul Khair		
183	Dhaka-10	AL	Ferdous Ahmed	JP(E)	Haji Md Shahjahan		
184	Dhaka-11	AL	Mohammad Wakil Uddin	JP(E)	Shamim Ahmed Rizvi		
185	Dhaka-12	AL	Asaduzzaman Khan	JP(E)	Khorshed Alam Khushu		
186	Dhaka-13	AL	Jahangir Kabir Nanak	JP(E)	Shafiqul Islam Sentu	BTF	Kamrul Ahsan
187	Dhaka-14	AL	Mainul Hossain Khan Nikhil	JP(E)	Md Almas Uddin		
188	Dhaka-15	AL	Kamal Ahmed Majumder	JP(E)	Md Shamsul Haque		
189	Dhaka-16	AL	Elias Uddin Mollah	JP(E)	Md Amanat Hossain Amant		
190	Dhaka-17	AL	Mohammad A. Arafat	JP(E)	Nomination Withdrawn	BNF	S.M. Abul Kalam Azad
191	Dhaka-18	AL	Nomination Withdrawn	JP(E)	Sharifa Quader	BNF	S.M. Abul Kalam Azad
192	Dhaka-19	AL	Md. Enamur Rahaman	JP(E)	Candidacy Invalid	Independent	Towhid Jung Murad
193	Dhaka-20	AL	Benzir Ahmed	JP(E)	Khan Md Israfil Khokon		
194	Gazipur-1	AL	A.K.M. Mozammel Huq	JP(E)	Candidacy Withdrawn	TBNP	Chowdhury Irad Ahmed Siddiky
195	Gazipur-2	AL	Zahid Ahsan Russel	JP(E)	Zainal Abedin	Independent	Md. Alim Uddin Buddin
196	Gazipur-3	AL	Rumana Ali	JP(E)	FM Saiful Islam	Independent	Iqbal Hossain Sabuj
197	Gazipur-4	AL	Simeen Hussain Rimi	JP(E)	Candidacy Withdrawn		
198	Gazipur-5	AL	Meher Afroze	JP(E)	Candidacy Withdrawn		
199	Narsingdi-1	AL	Muhammad Nazrul Islam	JP(E)	Md. Omar Farique Mia	Independent	Md. Kamruzzaman
200	Narsingdi-2	AL	Anwarul Ashraf Khan	JP(E)	ANM Rafiqul Islam Salim	Independent	Md. Masum Billah
201	Narsingdi-3	AL	Fazle Rabbi Khan	JP(E)	ASM Jahangir Pathan	Independent	Md. Saiful Islam Khan (Biru)
202	Narsingdi-4	AL	Nurul Majid Mahmud Humayun	JP(E)	Md. Kamal Uddin	Independent	Md. Sirajul Islam Mollah
203	Narsingdi-5	AL	Rajiuddin Ahmed Raju	JP(E)	Md. Shahidul Islam	Independent	Mijanur Rahman
204	Narayanganj-1	AL	Golam Dastagir Gazi	JP(E)	Md. Saiful Islam	TBNP	Taimur Alam Khandaker
205	Narayanganj-2	AL	Nazrul Islam Babu	JP(E)	Alamgir Sikder Loton		
206	Narayanganj-3	AL	Abdullah-Al-Kaisar	JP(E)	Liyakot Hossain Khoka	BTF	Md. Mujibur Rahman Manik
207	Narayanganj-4	AL	Shamim Osman	JP(E)	Alhaj Salah Uddin Khoka Molla		
208	Narayanganj-5	AL	-	JP(E)	Salim Osman		
209	Rajbari-1	AL	Kazi Keramat Ali	JP(E)	Khandkar Habibur Rahman Bachchu		
210	Rajbari-2	AL	Md. Zillul Hakim	JP(E)	Md. Shafiul Azam Khan		
211	Faridpur-1	AL	Abdur Rahman	JP(E)	Aktaruzzaman Khan		
212	Faridpur-2	AL	Shahdab Akbar Chowdhury	JP(E)	-		
213	Faridpur-3	AL	Shamim Haque	JP(E)	S.M. Yahya	Independent	A.K. Azad
214	Faridpur-4	AL	Kazi Zafarullah	JP(E)	Md. Anwar Hossain	Independent	Mujibur Rahman Chowdhury
215	Gopalganj-1	AL	Faruk Khan	JP(E)	Shahidul Islam Molla	Independent	Md. Kabir Mia
216	Gopalganj-2	AL	Sheikh Fazlul Karim Selim	JP(E)	Kazi Shaheen		
217	Gopalganj-3	AL	Sheikh Hasina	JP(E)	-		
218	Madaripur-1	AL	Noor-E-Alam Chowdhury Liton	JP(E)	Md. Motahar Hossain Siddiqui		
219	Madaripur-2	AL	Shajahan Khan	JP(E)	AKM Nuruzzaman Zaman		
220	Madaripur-3	AL	Abdus Sobhan Golap	JP(E)	Md Abdul Khalek		
221	Shariatpur-1	AL	Iqbal Hossain	JP(E)	-		
222	Shariatpur-2	AL	AKM Enamul Haque Shamim	JP(E)	Md. Wahidur Rahman		
223	Shariatpur-3	AL	Nahim Razzaq	JP(E)	Md. Abdul Hannan		
Sylhet Division
224	Sunamganj-1	AL	Ranjit Chandra Sarkar	JP(E)	Candidacy Withdrawn		
225	Sunamganj-2	AL	Chowdhury Abdullah Al Mahmud	JP(E)	-		
226	Sunamganj-3	AL	M.A. Mannan	JP(E)	-		
227	Sunamganj-4	AL	Mohammad Sadiq	JP(E)	Pir Fazlul Rahman Mizbah		
228	Sunamganj-5	AL	Mohibur Rahman Manik	JP(E)	Nazmul Huda Himel		
229	Sylhet-1	AL	A.K. Abdul Momen	JP(E)	Nazrul Islam Babul		
230	Sylhet-2	AL	Shafikur Rahaman Chowdhury	JP(E)	Maqsood Ibn Aziz Lama		
231	Sylhet-3	AL	Habibur Rahman Habib	JP(E)	Atiqur Rahman Atiq		
232	Sylhet-4	AL	Imran Ahmad	JP(E)	ATU Taj Rahman		
233	Sylhet-5	AL	Masuk Uddin Ahmed	JP(E)	Alhaj Sabbir Ahmad		
234	Sylhet-6	AL	Nurul Islam Nahid	JP(E)	Salim Uddin	TBNP	Shamsher M. Chowdhury
235	Moulvibazar-1	AL	Md. Shahab Uddin	JP(E)	Ahmad Riaz Uddin		
236	Moulvibazar-2	AL	Shafiul Alam Chowdhury Nadel	JP(E)	Abdul Malik	TBNP	MM Shahin
237	Moulvibazar-3	AL	Mohammad Zillur Rahman	JP(E)	Ruhul Amin		
238	Moulvibazar-4	AL	Md. Abdus Shahid	JP(E)	-		
239	Habiganj-1	AL	Nomination Withdrawn	JP(E)	M.A. Munim Chowdhury Babu	Independent	Amatul Kibria Keya Chowdhury
240	Habiganj-2	AL	Mayez Uddin Sharif	JP(E)	-	Independent	Md. Abdul Majid Khan
241	Habiganj-3	AL	Md. Abu Zahir	JP(E)	Abdul Mumin Chowdhury		
242	Habiganj-4	AL	Md. Mahbub Ali	JP(E)	Ahad Uddin Chowdhury Shaheen	Independent	Sayedul Haque Sumon
Chittagong Division
243	Brahmanbaria-1	AL	Bodruddoza Md. Farhad Hossain	JP(E)	Md. Shahanul Karim		
244	Brahmanbaria-2	AL	Nomination Withdrawn	JP(E)	Abdul Hamid		
245	Brahmanbaria-3	AL	R. A. M. Obaidul Muktadir Chowdhury	JP(E)	Md. Rezaul Islam Bhuiyan		
246	Brahmanbaria-4	AL	Anisul Huq	JP(E)	Tarek Ahmed Adel		
247	Brahmanbaria-5	AL	Faizur Rahman	JP(E)	Md. Mobarak Hossain Dulu		
248	Brahmanbaria-6	AL	AB Tajul Islam	JP(E)	Amjad Hossain		
249	Comilla-1	AL	Md. Abdus Sabur	JP(E)	Md. Amir Hossain Bhuiyan		
250	Comilla-2	AL	Selima Ahmad	JP(E)	A.T.M. Manjurul Islam		
251	Comilla-3	AL	Yussuf Abdullah Harun	JP(E)	Md. Alamgir Hossain		
252	Comilla-4	AL	Razee Mohammad Fakhrul	JP(E)	Yusuf Azgar		
253	Comilla-5	AL	Abul Hashem Khan	JP(E)	Md Jahangir Alam		
254	Comilla-6	AL	A. K. M. Bahauddin	JP(E)	Air Ahmed Saleem		
255	Comilla-7	AL	Pran Gopal Datta	JP(E)	Lutfar Reza Khokon		
256	Comilla-8	AL	A.Z.M. Shafiuddin Shamim	JP(E)	H.N.M Irfan		
257	Comilla-9	AL	Md. Tajul Islam	JP(E)	Md. Golam Mostafa Kamal		
258	Comilla-10	AL	Mustafa Kamal	JP(E)	Jonaki Munshi		
259	Comilla-11	AL	Mujibul Haque Mujib	JP(E)	Mustafa Kamal		
260	Chandpur-1	AL	Salim Mahmud	JP(E)	A.K.S.M. Shahidul Islam		
261	Chandpur-2	AL	Mofazzal Hossain Chowdhury	JP(E)	Md. Emran Hossain Mia		
262	Chandpur-3	AL	Dipu Moni	JP(E)	Mahasin Khan		
263	Chandpur-4	AL	Muhammad Shafiqur Rahman	JP(E)	Sajjad Rashid	BTF	Baqibillah Mishkat Chowdhury
264	Chandpur-5	AL	Rafiqul Islam	JP(E)	Md. Omar Farique	BTF	Baqibillah Mishkat Chowdhury
265	Feni-1	AL	Alauddin Ahmed Chowdhury Nasim	JP(E)	Shahriar Iqubal	JSD	Shirin Akhter
266	Feni-2	AL	Nizam Uddin Hazari	JP(E)	Khandaker Nazrul Islam		
267	Feni-3	AL	Nomination Withdrawn	JP(E)	Masud Uddin Chowdhury		
268	Noakhali-1	AL	H. M. Ibrahim	JP(E)	-	BTF	Selim Bhuiyan
269	Noakhali-2	AL	Morshed Alam	JP(E)	Md. Talebuzzaman		
270	Noakhali-3	AL	Md. Mamunur Rashid Kiron	JP(E)	Fazle Elahi Sohag Mia	Independent	Minhaz Ahmed Jabed
271	Noakhali-4	AL	Ekramul Karim Chowdhury	JP(E)	Mubarak Hossain Azad		
272	Noakhali-5	AL	Obaidul Quader	JP(E)	Khaja Tanveer Ahmed		
273	Noakhali-6	AL	Mohammad Ali	JP(E)	Mushfiqur Rahman		
274	Lakshmipur-1	AL	Anwar Hossain Khan	JP(E)	Mahmudur Rahman Mahmud	Independent	Md. Habibur Rahman Pobon
275	Lakshmipur-2	AL	Nuruddin Chowdhury Noyon	JP(E)	Borhan Uddin Ahmed Mithu		
276	Lakshmipur-3	AL	Mohammed Golam Faroque	JP(E)	Candidacy Withdrawn		
277	Lakshmipur-4	JSD	Mosharraf Hossain	JP(E)	-		
278	Chittagong-1	AL	Mahboob Rahman Ruhel	JP(E)	Md. Emdad Hossain Chowdhury	Independent	Md. Gias Uddin
279	Chittagong-2	AL	Khadizatul Anwar	JP(E)	Md. Shafiul Azam Chowdhury	BTF	Candidacy Withdrawn
280	Chittagong-3	AL	Mahfuzur Rahaman	JP(E)	M. A. Salam		
281	Chittagong-4	AL	S.M. Al Mamun	JP(E)	Md. Didarul Kabir	TBNP	Khokon Chowdhury
282	Chittagong-5	AL	Nomination Withdrawn	JP(E)	Anisul Islam Mahmud		
283	Chittagong-6	AL	A. B. M. Fazle Karim Chowdhury	JP(E)	Md. Shafiul Alam Chowdhury		
284	Chittagong-7	AL	Muhammad Hasan Mahmud	JP(E)	Musa Ahmed Rana		
285	Chittagong-8	AL	Nomination Withdrawn	JP(E)	Solaiman Alam Sheth	Independent	Abdus Salam
286	Chittagong-9	AL	Mohibul Hasan Chowdhury	JP(E)	Sanjid Rashid Chowdhury		
287	Chittagong-10	AL	Md. Mohiuddin Bacchu	JP(E)	-	Independent	M. Manjur Alam
288	Chittagong-11	AL	M. Abdul Latif	JP(E)	-	Independent	Ziaul Haque Sumon
289	Chittagong-12	AL	Motaharul Islam Chowdhury	JP(E)	Md. Nuruchchafa Sarkar	Independent	Shamsul Haque Chowdhury
290	Chittagong-13	AL	Saifuzzaman Chowdhury	JP(E)	Abdur Rab Chowdhury		
291	Chittagong-14	AL	Md. Nazrul Islam Chowdhury	JP(E)	Abu Zafar Md. Oliullah	BTF	Alhajj Muhammad Ali Faruki
292	Chittagong-15	AL	Abu Reza Muhammad Nezamuddin	JP(E)	Md. Salem	Independent	Abdul Motaleb
293	Chittagong-16	AL	Candidacy Cancelled	JP(E)	Didn't Submit Nomination Paper		
294	Cox's Bazar-1	AL	Candidacy Invalid	JP(E)	Hosne Ara	BKP	Syed Muhammad Ibrahim
295	Cox's Bazar-2	AL	Asheq Ullah Rafiq	JP(E)	Didn't Submit Nomination Paper	BNM	Mohammad Sharif Badsha
296	Cox's Bazar-3	AL	Shaimum Sarwar Kamal	JP(E)	Md. Tareq	BKP	Abdul Awal Mamun
297	Cox's Bazar-4	AL	Shahin Akhtar	JP(E)	Nurul Amin Sikder Bhutto	TBNP	Mujibul Haque Mujib
298	Khagrachhari	AL	Kujendra Lal Tripura	JP(E)	Mithila Roaza	TBNP	Ushepru Marma
299	Rangamati	AL	Dipankar Talukdar	JP(E)	Didn't Submit Nomination Paper	BSM	Amor Kumar Dey
300	Bandarban	AL	Bir Bahadur Ushwe Sing	JP(E)	A.T.M. Shahidul Islam	Independent	Nomination Withdrawn

== Surveys and polls ==
Approval ratings

Polling firm/Link	Fieldwork date	Date published	Sample size	Margin of Error	Government				'Opposition'			
Polling firm/Link	Fieldwork date	Date published	Sample size	Margin of Error	Approval	Disapproval	Neither/Don't know	Net approval	Approval	Disapproval	Neither/Don't know	Lead
International Republican Institute	1 Mar – 6 Apr 2023	8 Aug 2023	5,000	±1.4	70	30	1	+40	63	26	12	+37
Research and Training International	—	26 Jan 2020	2,266	±2.9	85	3	12	+82	7	25	68	–18
International Republican Institute	1 Aug – 16 Sep 2019	8 Jan 2020	4,993	±1.4	83	11	7	+72	36	34	30	+2

Seat projections

Polling firm/Link	Fieldwork date	Date published	Sample size	Margin of Error	Grand Alliance				BNP+			JaPa (Ershad)	KSJL	BJP (Naziur)	Trinomool BNP	Islami Andolan	Neither/Don't know/Others	Majority	
Polling firm/Link	Fieldwork date	Date published	Sample size	Margin of Error	Awami League	Workers Party	JaSaD (Inu)	JP (Manju)	BNP	Jamaat	LDP (Oli)	JaPa (Ershad)	KSJL	BJP (Naziur)	Trinomool BNP	Islami Andolan	Neither/Don't know/Others	Majority	
Bangladesh Economic Association	April–October 2023	26 Oct 2023			148–166	—	—	—	119–150	2	1	11	—	1	—	—	—	Hung	16

== Foreign observers ==
On 5 January 2024, at a meeting attended by heads of missions from about 90 countries, Bangladesh's Foreign Secretary, Masud Bin Momen, invited foreign envoys to be part of the international team of observers for its general elections scheduled for 7 January 2024. A total of 127 observers from various countries, were present for these polls, including members from the European Union, The Commonwealth, the South Asia Democratic Forum (SADF), the US-based International Republican Institute (IRI), National Democratic Institute (NDI) and American Global Strategies (AGS); UK-based Conservative Commonwealth Association and other reputable organizations.

After the vote on 7 January 2024, this election drew mixed reactions among international observers. Representatives of many international team of observers acknowledged that this election was conducted free and fairly and praised the role and efficiency of present Bangladesh Election Commission. Alexander Barton Gray, CEO of American Global Strategies (AGS) said "Considering the overall situation, all the observers present here agree that the 12th National Parliament Election of Bangladesh was held peacefully and with the participation of the common people". The CEO of the Central Election Commission of Palestine, Hisam M.Y Kuhail, made remarks during a media briefing in Dhaka. "The voting process in all the centers that we visited was very quiet and peaceful," Kuhail said. "The people of your country should be proud of holding such a peaceful election." When asked about the voter turnout, Kuhail avoided the question, stating, "We are here to judge the voting process, whether voters were allowed access to the polls or whether voting took place systematically.

The governments of the United States of America and Canada had separately confirmed, through official statements, that they did not deploy any election observers with their authority to monitor Bangladesh's national elections held on 7 January. Despite that, a group of international observers were present at their own effort. However, some US, UK based international team of observers expressed the views that this election was not free or fair. Local media in Bangladesh reported that the Hasina government lined up their supporters near polling stations when cameras and foreign election observers were near and had them disperse immediately afterwards. However, some election observers did report a peaceful environment at the polling stations on the day of the elections.

== Violence ==
The Secretary of the Election Commission, Jahangir Alam, stated that Mustafizur Rahman Chowdhury's candidacy from the Chittagong-16 comstituency was cancelled for "violating election norms" and for threatening law enforcement officials just before polling was officially closed. He was accused with similar allegations in past as well.

== Results ==
Summary table of the results of 2024 Bangladeshi general election
Party	Seats				Votes		
Party	General	Women	Total	Net	#	%	±pp
Bangladesh Awami League (Note: 6 candidates from other affiliate parties also contested with the Awami League's symbol Boat, who received 392,528 votes. Among those six, 2 got elected, one each from the Workers Party of Bangladesh and the Jatiya Samajtantrik Dal.) (Note: Based on the general seats won, the Awami League was supposed to get 37 reserved seats for women on a proportional basis. However, when all winning independent candidates from general seats gave support to the Awami League for the reserved women's seats election, the party fielded candidates for a total 48 seats— incorporating the seats strength of the independents.) (Note: Among the Awami League's officially nominated 48 candidates for the women reserved seats, 1 candidate (Kanan Ara Begum) was from the affiliate Ganatantri Party. However, she remained as an Awami League nominated member in official state records and functionality.)	224	47	271	▼29	32,113,540	65.15	▼9.81
Jatiya Party (Ershad)	11	2	13	▼15	2,179,673	4.42	▼0.80
Workers Party of Bangladesh (Note: Workers Party of Bangladesh fielded a total 26 candidates. Among them, 24 (92.31%) contested with their party's symbol Hammer and received 99,378 votes (39.40%). The other 2 (7.69%) coalition candidates contested with the Awami League's Boat symbol and received 152,835 votes (60.60%).)	1	0	1	▼2	252,213	0.51	▼0.25
Jatiya Samajtantrik Dal (Inu) (Note: Jatiya Samajtantrik Dal (Inu) fielded a total 66 candidates. Among them, 63 (95.45%) contested with their party's symbol Torch and received 62,361 (26.95%). The other 3 (4.55%) coalition candidates contested with the Awami League's Boat symbol and received 169,012 votes (73.05%).)	1	0	1	▼1	231,373	0.47	▼0.25
Bangladesh Kallyan Party (Ibrahim)	1	0	1	▲1	94,332	0.19	▲0.14
Ganatantri Party	0	1	1	▲1	6,772	0.01	▲0.01
Bangladesh Nationalist Movement	0	0	0	New entry	157,573	0.32	New entry
Trinomool BNP	0	0	0	New entry	139,829	0.28	New entry
Zaker Party	0	0	0	0	89,394	0.18	▲0.05
Krishak Sramik Janata League	0	0	0	0	88,854	0.18	▲0.01
Bangladesh Congress	0	0	0	New entry	88,613	0.18	New entry
Jatiya Party (Manju) (Note: Jatiya Party (Manju) fielded a total 13 candidates. Among them, 12 (92.31%) contested with their party's symbol Bicycle and received 10,438 votes (12.87%). The other 1 (7.69%) coalition candidate contested with the Awami League's Boat symbol and received 70,681 (87.13%).)	0	0	0	▼1	81,119	0.16	▼0.05
National People's Party (Nilu)	0	0	0	0	79,550	0.16	▲0.12
Bangladesh Islami Front	0	0	0	0	77,631	0.16	▲0.09
Islami Oikya Jote (Amini)	0	0	0	0	60,414	0.12	▲0.11
Islamic Front Bangladesh	0	0	0	0	56,025	0.11	▲0.05
Bangladesh Supreme Party	0	0	0	New entry	55,407	0.11	New entry
Bangladesh Sangskritik Muktijote	0	0	0	0	31,624	0.06	▲0.06
Bangladesh Nationalist Front	0	0	0	0	27,454	0.06	▲0.04
Bangladesh Tarikat Federation	0	0	0	▼1	24,219	0.05	▼0.46
Bikalpa Dhara Bangladesh (Badruddoza)	0	0	0	▼2	22,979	0.05	▼0.61
Bangladesh Khilafat Andolan	0	0	0	0	11,846	0.02	▲0.01
Gano Front	0	0	0	0	10,929	0.02	▲0.01
Gono Forum (Kamal)	0	0	0	▼2	9,964	0.02	▼0.57
Bangladesh National Awami Party (Muzaffar)	0	0	0	0	2,480	0.01	0.00
Communist Party of Bangladesh (M.L.) (Barua)	0	0	0	0	1,836	0.00	0.00
Bangladesh Jatiya Party (Matin)	0	0	0	0	1,494	0.00	▼0.01
Bangladesh Muslim League (Kamaruzzaman)	0	0	0	0	762	0.00	0.00
Independent(s)	62	0	62	▲58	13,295,218	26.97	▲25.21
Total	300	50	350	—	49,293,117	100.0	—
Valid votes					49,293,117	98.02	▼0.95
Invalid votes					995,641	1.98	▲0.95
Total votes					50,288,758	100.0	—
Registered voters/Turnout					119,691,633 (Note: This figure is the final voter count previously disclosed by the EC. The party-wise results are the sums of the constituency-wise results published by the EC; therefore if the voter counts are aggregated from those same seat-wise results, the total number of voter stands at 119,686,373. Even in that case, the voter turnout is roughly 42.02%.)	42.02	▼40.56

=== Division-wise ===
==== Barishal Division ====
Vote share by parties (Barishal Division).
1. AL (59.0%)
2. JaPa (5.59%)
3. WPB (4.18%)
4. JP-M (2.30%)
5. BCP (1.06%)
6. NPP (0.35%)
7. TBNP (0.23%)
8. JaSaD (0.14%)
9. BTF (0.12%)
10. Inds. (26.6%)
11. Others (0.39%)

2024 Bangladesh general election (12th Jatiya Sangsad) : Barishal Division
Party	Seats			Votes			
Party	Contested	Won	+/–	In total			Average
Party	Contested	Won	+/–		%	+/–pp	Average
Bangladesh Awami League	15	14	▼4	1,893,530	59.05		126,235
Jatiya Party	18	2	0	179,314	5.59		9,962
Workers Party of Bangladesh	3	1	▲1	134,073	4.18		44,691
Jatiya Party	2	0	▼1	73,872	2.30		36,936
Bangladesh Congress	10	0	New entry	34,034	1.06		3,403
National People's Party (Shalu)	11	0	0	11,146	0.35		1,013
Trinomool Bangladesh National Party	9	0	New entry	7,510	0.23		729
Jatiya Samajtantrik Dal (Inu)	4	0	0	4,569	0.14		1,142
Bangladesh Tarikat Federation	6	0	0	3,857	0.12		643
Bangladesh Shangskritik Muktijote (Muktijote)	6	0	0	2,894	0.09		482
Bangladesh Nationalist Front	2	0	0	2,350	0.07		1,175
Bangladesh Nationalist Movement	2	0	New entry	2,017	0.06		1,009
Zaker Party	1	0	0	1,624	0.05		1,624
Krishak Sramik Janata League	1	0	0	1,421	0.04		1,421
Bangladesh Supreme Party	3	0	New entry	990	0.03		330
Gano Front	1	0	0	518	0.02		518
Bangladesh Kallyan Party (Ibrahim)	1	0	0	195	0.01		195
Independent	15	4	▲4	852,695	26.59		
Total		21	—	3,206,609	100.00	—	—
Valid votes				3,206,609	98.61		
Invalid votes				45,044	1.39		
Total votes cast				3,251,653	100.00		
Registered voters/Turnout				7,423,300	43.80		
Source: BEC

==== Chattogram Division (w/o Cumilla) ====
Vote share by parties (Chattogram Division).
1. AL (70.4%)
2. JaPa (2.84%)
3. BKP (2.34%)
4. BIF (1.30%)
5. BNM (1.02%)
6. TBNP (0.54%)
7. IFB (0.42%)
8. NPP (0.26%)
9. BSP (0.20%)
10. Inds. (20.3%)
11. Others (0.37%)

2024 Bangladesh general election (12th Jatiya Sangsad) : Chattogram Division
Party	Seats			Votes			
Party	Contested	Won	+/–	In total			Average
Party	Contested	Won	+/–	#	%	+/–pp	Average
Bangladesh Awami League	19	18	▼3	2,519,531	70.39		132,607
Jatiya Party	19	1	0	101,680	2.84		5,352
Bangladesh Kallyan Party (Ibrahim)	5	1	▲1	83,736	2.34		16,747
Bangladesh Islami Front	13	0	0	46,393	1.30		5,352
Bangladesh Nationalist Movement	2	0	New entry	36,659	1.02		18,330
Trinomool Bangladesh National Party	13	0	New entry	19,382	0.54		3,569
Islamic Front Bangladesh	16	0	0	15,108	0.42		944
National People's Party (Nilu)	7	0	0	9,390	0.26		1,341
Bangladesh Supreme Party	10	0	New entry	6,987	0.20		699
Bangladesh Shangskritik Muktijote (Muktijote)	2	0	0	5,051	0.14		2,526
Bangladesh National Awami Party (Muzaffar)	3	0	0	1,744	0.05		581
Bangladesh Nationalist Front	6	0	0	1,539	0.04		257
Islami Oikya Jote	4	0	0	1,509	0.04		377
Bangladesh Congress	5	0	New entry	879	0.02		176
Jatiya Samajtantrik Dal (Inu)	2	0	0	724	0.02		362
Bangladesh Khilafat Andolan	1	0	0	615	0.02		615
Workers Party of Bangladesh	1	0	0	537	0.02		537
Bangladesh Tarikat Federation	2	0	▼1	325	0.01		163
Gano Forum	1	0	0	145	0.00		145
Bangladesh Muslim League (Kamaruzzaman)	1	0	0	46	0.00		46
Independent	16	3	▲3	727,423	20.32		
Total		23	—	3,579,403	100.00	—	—
Valid votes				3,579,403	97.16		
Invalid votes				104,791	2.84		
Total votes cast				3,684,194	100.00		
Registered voters/Turnout				9,243,258	39.86		
Source: BEC

==== Cumilla Division ====
Vote share by parties (Cumilla Division).
1. AL (72.3%)
2. JaPa (3.73%)
3. JaSaD (0.76%)
4. IFB (0.46%)
5. BIF (0.25%)
6. BSP (0.23%)
7. TBNP (0.17%)
8. BTF (0.17%)
9. BSM (0.15%)
10. Inds. (21.0%)
11. Others (0.82%)

2024 Bangladesh general election (12th Jatiya Sangsad) : Cumilla Division
Party	Seats			Votes			
Party	Contested	Won	+/–	In total			Average
Party	Contested	Won	+/–	#	%	+/–pp	Average
Bangladesh Awami League	32	27	▼3	4,301,121	72.32		134,410
Jatiya Party	29	1	0	221,945	3.73		7,653
Jatiya Samajtantrik Dal (Inu)	12	0	▼1	45,354	0.76		3,780
Islamic Front Bangladesh	9	0	0	27,115	0.46		3,013
Bangladesh Islami Front	12	0	0	14,576	0.25		1,215
Bangladesh Supreme Party	14	0	New entry	13,541	0.23		967
Trinomool Bangladesh National Party	12	0	New entry	10,307	0.17		859
Bangladesh Tarikat Federation	10	0	0	10,190	0.17		1,019
Bangladesh Shangskritik Muktijote (Muktijote)	12	0	0	9,091	0.15		758
Bangladesh Congress	7	0	New entry	7,702	0.13		1,100
Islami Oikya Jote	7	0	0	7,462	0.13		1,066
National People's Party (Nilu)	7	0	0	7,199	0.12		1,028
Zaker Party	5	0	0	6,359	0.11		1,272
Krishak Sramik Janata League	3	0	0	4,651	0.08		1,550
Bangladesh Khilafat Andolan	4	0	0	3,321	0.06		830
Gano Front	5	0	0	2,703	0.05		541
Bangladesh Nationalist Movement	3	0	New entry	2,635	0.04		878
Gano Forum	3	0	0	1,825	0.03		608
Workers Party of Bangladesh	3	0	0	1,055	0.02		352
Bangladesh Kallyan Party (Ibrahim)	3	0	0	545	0.01		182
Communist Party of Bangladesh (Marxist–Leninist)	1	0	0	533	0.01		533
Bangladesh National Awami Party (Muzaffar)	1	0	0	494	0.01		494
Bangladesh Jatiya Party (Matin)	1	0	0	382	0.01		382
Bangladesh Nationalist Front	3	0	0	372	0.01		124
Independent	27	7	▲6	1,246,726	20.96		
Total		35	—	5,947,204	100.00	—	—
Valid votes				5,947,204	98.18		
Invalid votes				109,963	1.82		
Total votes cast				6,057,167	100.00		
Registered voters/Turnout				14,511,027	41.74		
Source: BEC

==== Dhaka Division (w/o Faridpur) ====
Vote share by parties (Dhaka Division).
1. AL (62.9%)
2. JaPa (5.36%)
3. KSJL (0.95%)
4. BDB (0.27%)
5. TBNP (0.26%)
6. BSP (0.24%)
7. NPP (0.15%)
8. IFB (0.14%)
9. BZP (0.13%)
10. Inds. (28.8%)
11. Others (0.89%)

2024 Bangladesh general election (12th Jatiya Sangsad) : Dhaka Division
Party	Seats			Votes			
Party	Contested	Won	+/–	In total			Average
Party	Contested	Won	+/–	#	%	+/–pp	Average
Bangladesh Awami League	51	40	▼8	4,944,763	62.87		96,956
Jatiya Party	46	2	▼3	421,540	5.36		9,164
Krishak Sramik Janata League	8	0	0	74,383	0.95		9,298
Bikalpa Dhara Bangladesh	5	0	▼1	21,274	0.27		4,255
Trinomool Bangladesh National Party	26	0	New entry	20,741	0.26		798
Bangladesh Supreme Party	28	0	New entry	18,912	0.24		675
National People's Party (Nilu)	29	0	0	11,522	0.15		397
Islamic Front Bangladesh	8	0	0	11,217	0.14		1,402
Zaker Party	5	0	0	10,184	0.13		2,037
Islami Oikya Jote	9	0	0	9,872	0.13		1,097
Bangladesh Islami Front	7	0	0	8,358	0.11		1,194
Bangladesh Nationalist Movement	10	0	New entry	6,763	0.09		676
Bangladesh Congress	19	0	New entry	6,460	0.08		340
Gano Forum	2	0	0	5,503	0.07		2,752
Bangladesh Shangskritik Muktijote (Muktijote)	19	0	0	4,947	0.06		260
Bangladesh Nationalist Front	17	0	0	4,684	0.06		276
Jatiya Samajtantrik Dal (Inu)	9	0	0	3,996	0.05		444
Bangladesh Tarikat Federation	9	0	0	3,987	0.05		443
Gano Front	10	0	0	3,332	0.04		333
Ganatantri Party	5	0	0	3,016	0.04		603
Bangladesh Khilafat Andolan	1	0	0	2,635	0.03		2,635
Bangladesh Kallyan Party (Ibrahim)	2	0	0	981	0.01		491
Workers Party of Bangladesh	2	0	▼1	907	0.01		454
Bangladesh Jatiya Party (Matin)	3	0	0	598	0.01		199
Jatiya Party	2	0	0	559	0.01		280
Communist Party of Bangladesh (Marxist–Leninist)	1	0	0	234	0.00		234
Independent	40	13	▲13	2,264,141	28.79		
Total		55	—	7,865,509	100.00	—	—
Valid votes				7,865,509	98.27		
Invalid votes				138,402	1.73		
Total votes cast				8,003,911	100.00		
Registered voters/Turnout				23,147,793	34.58		
Source: BEC

==== Faridpur Division ====
Vote share by parties (Faridpur Division).
1. AL (72.6%)
2. BNM (0.70%)
3. JaPa (0.66%)
4. TBNP (0.18%)
5. IOJ (0.13%)
6. BSP (0.13%)
7. BCP (0.13%)
8. BKA (0.11%)
9. JaSaD (0.11%)
10. Inds. (25.1%)
11. Others (0.16%)

2024 Bangladesh general election (12th Jatiya Sangsad) : Faridpur Division
Party	Seats			Votes			
Party	Contested	Won	+/–	In total			Average
Party	Contested	Won	+/–	#	%	+/–pp	Average
Bangladesh Awami League	15	12	▼2	2,375,119	72.57		158,341
Bangladesh Nationalist Movement	2	0	New entry	22,757	0.70		11,379
Jatiya Party	13	0	0	21,512	0.66		1,655
Trinomool Bangladesh National Party	7	0	New entry	5,804	0.18		829
Islami Oikya Jote	1	0	0	4,188	0.13		4,188
Bangladesh Supreme Party	6	0	New entry	4,183	0.13		697
Bangladesh Congress	5	0	New entry	4,179	0.13		836
Bangladesh Khilafat Andolan	3	0	0	3,682	0.11		1,227
Jatiya Samajtantrik Dal (Inu)	3	0	0	3,445	0.11		1,148
Bangladesh Tarikat Federation	3	0	0	2,955	0.09		985
Bangladesh Shangskritik Muktijote (Muktijote)	3	0	0	1,119	0.03		373
National People's Party (Nilu)	3	0	0	896	0.03		299
Zaker Party	1	0	0	425	0.01		425
Gano Front	2	0	0	297	0.01		149
Krishak Sramik Janata League	1	0	0	263	0.01		263
Bikalpa Dhara Bangladesh	1	0	0	46	0.00		46
Independent	11	3	▲2	822,143	25.12		
Total		15	—	3,273,013	100.00	—	—
Valid votes				3,273,013	98.86		
Invalid votes				37,787	1.14		
Total votes cast				3,310,800	100.00		
Registered voters/Turnout				5,740,891	57.67		
Source: BEC

==== Khulna Division ====
Vote share by parties (Khulna Division).
1. AL (65.1%)
2. JaPa (3.34%)
3. JaSaD (1.53%)
4. BNM (0.78%)
5. TBNP (0.27%)
6. BCP (0.24%)
7. NPP (0.24%)
8. BZP (0.16%)
9. IOJ (0.15%)
10. Inds. (27.8%)
11. Others (0.33%)

2024 Bangladesh general election (12th Jatiya Sangsad) : Khulna Division
Party	Seats			Votes			
Party	Contested	Won	+/–	In total			Average
Party	Contested	Won	+/–		%	+/–pp	Average
Bangladesh Awami League	34	29	▼5	4,081,537	65.13		120,045
Jatiya Party	35	1	▲1	209,298	3.34		5,980
Jatiya Samajtantrik Dal (Inu)	5	0	▼1	96,178	1.53		19,236
Bangladesh Nationalist Movement	12	0	New entry	48,800	0.78		4,067
Trinomool Bangladesh National Party	23	0	New entry	16,763	0.27		729
Bangladesh Congress	15	0	New entry	15,231	0.24		1,015
National People's Party (Shalu)	17	0	0	15,104	0.24		888
Zaker Party	4	0	0	10,252	0.16		2,563
Islami Oikya Jote	4	0	0	9,236	0.15		2,309
Workers Party of Bangladesh	5	0	▼1	8,343	0.13		1,669
Bangladesh Nationalist Front	4	0	0	3,802	0.06		951
Bangladesh Shangskritik Muktijote (Muktijote)	7	0	New entry	2,329	0.04		333
Islamic Front Bangladesh	1	0	0	1,398	0.02		1,398
Bangladesh Khilafat Andolan	1	0	0	1,246	0.02		1,246
Ganatantri Party	1	0	0	845	0.01		845
Communist Party of Bangladesh (Marxist–Leninist)	1	0	0	778	0.01		778
Gano Front	1	0	0	582	0.01		582
Bikalpa Dhara Bangladesh	1	0	0	555	0.01		555
Bangladesh Supreme Party	2	0	New entry	538	0.01		269
Bangladesh Tarikat Federation	2	0	0	528	0.01		264
Jatiya Party	1	0	0	515	0.01		515
Bangladesh Kallyan Party (Ibrahim)	1	0	0	296	0.00		296
Bangladesh National Awami Party (Muzaffar)	1	0	0	242	0.00		242
Independent	33	6	▲6	1,742,354	27.80		
Total		36	—	6,266,750	100.00	—	—
Valid votes				6,266,750	97.13		
Invalid votes				185,121	2.87		
Total votes cast				6,451,871	100.00		
Registered voters/Turnout				13,446,783	47.98		
Source: BEC

==== Mymensingh Division ====
Vote share by parties (Mymensingh Division).
1. AL (66.2%)
2. JaPa (2.84%)
3. JaSaD (0.13%)
4. TBNP (0.13%)
5. KSJL (0.12%)
6. JP-M (0.09%)
7. IOJ (0.09%)
8. GF (0.07%)
9. NPP (0.04%)
10. Inds. (30.1%)
11. Others (0.13%)

2024 Bangladesh general election (12th Jatiya Sangsad) : Mymensingh Division
Party	Seats			Votes			
Party	Contested	Won	+/–	In total			Average
Party	Contested	Won	+/–	#	%	+/–pp	Average
Bangladesh Awami League	22	15	▼7	2,840,426	66.23		129,110
Jatiya Party	23	0	▼2	121,596	2.84		5,287
Jatiya Samajtantrik Dal (Inu)	4	0	0	5,726	0.13		1,432
Trinomool Bangladesh National Party	13	0	New entry	5,411	0.13		416
Krishak Sramik Janata League	7	0	0	5,265	0.12		752
Jatiya Party	3	0	0	3,821	0.09		1,274
Islami Oikya Jote	4	0	0	3,780	0.09		945
Gano Front	1	0	0	3,093	0.07		3,093
National People's Party (Nilu)	6	0	0	1,795	0.04		299
Bangladesh Shangskritik Muktijote (Muktijote)	3	0	0	1,217	0.03		406
Bangladesh Congress	3	0	New entry	973	0.02		324
Zaker Party	1	0	0	950	0.02		950
Bangladesh Supreme Party	4	0	New entry	578	0.01		145
Bangladesh Nationalist Movement	2	0	New entry	557	0.01		279
Bangladesh Nationalist Front	1	0	0	513	0.01		513
Bangladesh Tarikat Federation	1	0	0	286	0.01		286
Workers Party of Bangladesh	1	0	0	252	0.01		252
Bangladesh Muslim League (Bulbul)	1	0	0	126	0.00		126
Independent	21	9	▲9	1,292,062	30.13		
Total		24	—	4,288,427	100.00	—	—
Valid votes				4,288,427	98.71		
Invalid votes				56,194	1.29		
Total votes cast				4,344,621	100.00		
Registered voters/Turnout				9,558,676	45.45		
Source: BEC

==== Rajshahi Division ====
Vote share by parties (Rajshahi Division).
1. AL (65.2%)
2. JaPa (1.82%)
3. JaSaD (0.83%)
4. WPB (0.60%)
5. BNM (0.34%)
6. BCP (0.18%)
7. BNF (0.16%)
8. NPP (0.14%)
9. TBNP (0.14%)
10. Inds. (30.3%)
11. Others (0.25%)

2024 Bangladesh general election (12th Jatiya Sangsad) : Rajshahi Division
Party	Seats			Votes			
Party	Contested	Won	+/–	In total			Average
Party	Contested	Won	+/–		%	+/–pp	Average
Bangladesh Awami League	35	32	▲1	4,317,852	65.25		123,367
Jatiya Party	37	1	▼1	120,198	1.82		3,249
Jatiya Samajtantrik Dal (Inu)	18	1	▲1	54,946	0.83		3,053
Workers Party of Bangladesh	6	0	▼1	39,993	0.60		6,666
Bangladesh Nationalist Movement	15	0	New entry	22,201	0.34		1,480
Bangladesh Congress	14	0	New entry	11,974	0.18		855
Bangladesh Nationalist Front	7	0	0	10,775	0.16		1,539
National People's Party (Shalu)	16	0	0	9,550	0.14		597
Trinomool Bangladesh National Party	14	0	New entry	9,298	0.14		664
Islami Oikya Jote	1	0	0	4,105	0.06		4,105
Zaker Party	1	0	0	2,015	0.03		2,015
Bangladesh Supreme Party	5	0	New entry	1,956	0.03		391
Bangladesh Shangskritik Muktijote (Muktijote)	4	0	New entry	1,779	0.03		445
Jatiya Party	2	0	0	1,540	0.02		770
Ganatantri Party	2	0	0	1,469	0.02		735
Krishak Sramik Janata League	2	0	0	959	0.01		480
Bangladesh Islami Front	1	0	0	754	0.01		754
Bangladesh Tarikat Federation	3	0	0	728	0.01		243
Bangladesh Khilafat Andolan	1	0	0	347	0.01		347
Gano Front	1	0	0	323	0.00		323
Bikalpa Dhara Bangladesh	1	0	0	230	0.00		230
Independent	32	5	▲4	2,004,442	30.29		
Total		39	—	6,617,434	100.00	—	—
Valid votes				6,617,434	97.63		
Invalid votes				160,318	2.37		
Total votes cast				6,777,752	100.00		
Registered voters/Turnout				15,462,150	43.83		
Source: BEC, Dhaka Post, Bangladesh Gazette 18475-18514

==== Rangpur Division ====
Vote share by parties (Rangpur Division).
1. AL (53.2%)
2. JaPa (12.8%)
3. WPB (1.23%)
4. BZP (1.15%)
5. JaSaD (0.26%)
6. BNM (0.26%)
7. NPP (0.18%)
8. TBNP (0.16%)
9. IOJ (0.15%)
10. Inds. (30.1%)
11. Others (0.49%)

2024 Bangladesh general election (12th Jatiya Sangsad) : Rangpur Division
Party	Seats			Votes			
Party	Contested	Won	+/–	In total			Average
Party	Contested	Won	+/–	#	%	+/–pp	Average
Bangladesh Awami League	24	22	▼3	2,853,161	53.20		118,882
Jatiya Party	30	3	▼4	689,037	12.85		22,968
Workers Party of Bangladesh	4	0	0	65,775	1.23		16,444
Zaker Party	2	0	0	61,638	1.15		30,819
Jatiya Samajtantrik Dal (Inu)	8	0	0	14,189	0.26		1,773
Bangladesh Nationalist Movement	4	0	New entry	13,980	0.26		3,495
National People's Party (Nilu)	19	0	0	9,762	0.18		514
Trinomool Bangladesh National Party	9	0	New entry	8,736	0.16		971
Islami Oikya Jote	2	0	0	7,847	0.15		3,924
Bangladesh Supreme Party	5	0	New entry	6,683	0.12		1,337
Bangladesh Congress	11	0	New entry	5,319	0.10		484
Bangladesh Kallyan Party (Ibrahim)	4	0	0	3,641	0.07		910
Bangladesh Nationalist Front	5	0	0	3,360	0.06		840
Krishak Sramik Janata League	5	0	0	1,481	0.03		296
Ganatantri Party	1	0	0	1,193	0.02		1,193
Bangladesh Tarikat Federation	1	0	0	1,079	0.02		1,079
Bangladesh Shangskritik Muktijote (Muktijote)	2	0	New entry	863	0.02		432
Bikalpa Dhara Bangladesh	2	0	0	713	0.01		357
Jatiya Party	2	0	0	608	0.01		304
Bangladesh Islami Front	1	0	0	500	0.01		500
Bangladesh Muslim League (Bulbul)	1	0	0	376	0.01		376
Communist Party of Bangladesh (Marxist–Leninist)	1	0	0	291	0.01		291
Islamic Front Bangladesh	1	0	0	265	0.00		265
Independent	30	8	▲8	1,612,536	30.07		
Total		33	—	5,363,033	100.00	—	—
Valid votes				5,363,033	97.85		
Invalid votes				117,909	2.15		
Total votes cast				5,480,942	100.00		
Registered voters/Turnout				13,296,954	41.22		
Source: BEC

==== Sylhet Division ====
Vote share by parties (Sylhet Division).
1. AL (68.8%)
2. JaPa (3.24%)
3. TBNP (1.24%)
4. IOJ (0.43%)
5. BIF (0.24%)
6. NPP (0.11%)
7. GaFo (0.09%)
8. BSM (0.08%)
9. JaSaD (0.08%)
10. Inds. (25.3%)
11. Others (0.35%)

2024 Bangladesh general election (12th Jatiya Sangsad) : Sylhet Division
Party	Seats			Votes			
Party	Contested	Won	+/–	In total			Average
Party	Contested	Won	+/–	#	%	+/–pp	Average
Bangladesh Awami League	18	15	▼1	1,986,500	68.84		110,361
Jatiya Party	15	0	▼1	93,553	3.24		6,237
Trinomool Bangladesh National Party	9	0	New entry	35,877	1.24		3,986
Islami Oikya Jote	9	0	0	12,415	0.43		1,379
Bangladesh Islami Front	4	0	0	7,050	0.24		1,763
National People's Party (Nilu)	7	0	0	3,186	0.11		455
Gano Forum	2	0	▼2	2,491	0.09		1,246
Bangladesh Shangskritik Muktijote (Muktijote)	5	0	0	2,334	0.08		467
Jatiya Samajtantrik Dal (Inu)	1	0	0	2,246	0.08		2,246
Bangladesh Congress	7	0	New entry	1,862	0.06		266
Workers Party of Bangladesh	1	0	0	1,278	0.04		1,278
Bangladesh Nationalist Movement	4	0	New entry	1,204	0.04		301
Bangladesh Supreme Party	2	0	New entry	1,039	0.04		520
Islamic Front Bangladesh	3	0	0	922	0.03		307
Zaker Party	1	0	0	885	0.03		885
Bangladesh Jatiya Party (Matin)	1	0	0	514	0.02		514
Krishak Sramik Janata League	3	0	0	431	0.01		144
Bangladesh Tarikat Federation	1	0	0	284	0.01		284
Ganatantri Party	1	0	0	249	0.01		249
Bangladesh Muslim League (Kamaruzzaman)	1	0	0	214	0.01		214
Jatiya Party	1	0	0	204	0.01		204
Bikalpa Dhara Bangladesh	1	0	0	161	0.01		161
Gano Front	1	0	0	81	0.00		81
Bangladesh Nationalist Front	1	0	0	59	0.00		59
Independent	13	4	▲4	730,696	25.32		
Total		19	—	2,885,735	100.00	—	—
Valid votes				2,885,735	98.63		
Invalid votes				40,112	1.37		
Total votes cast				2,925,847	100.00		
Registered voters/Turnout				7,855,841	37.24		
Source: BEC

=== Constituency-wise ===
Parliamentary Constituency				Winner				Runner Up				Margin		Turnout
#	Division	Name	Total Voters	Candidate	Party	Votes	%	Candidate	Party	Votes	%	Votes	%	Turnout
1	Rangpur	Panchagarh-1	436,923	Naimuzzaman Bhuiyan Mukta	AL	124,742	66.73%	Anwar Sadat Samrat	IND	57,210	30.60%	67,532	36.12%	44.08%
2	Rangpur	Panchagarh-2	389,941	Md. Nurul Islam Sujon	AL	181,725	91.67%	Lutfar Rahman Ripon	JP(E)	7,627	3.85%	174,098	87.82%	53.18%
3	Rangpur	Thakurgaon-1	480,604	Ramesh Chandra Sen	AL	205,313	89.03%	Raziur Reza Swapan	JP(E)	13,940	6.04%	191,373	82.99%	49.70%
4	Rangpur	Thakurgaon-2	317,965	Mazharul Islam Suzon	AL	115,416	64.74%	Ali Aslam Jewel	IND	57,245	32.11%	58,171	32.63%	57.12%
5	Rangpur	Thakurgaon-3	344,354	Hafiz Uddin Ahmed	JP(E)	106,714	61.39%	Gopal Chandra Roy	WPB	64,821	37.29%	41,893	24.10%	51.18%
6	Rangpur	Dinajpur-1	392,826	Md. Zakaria Zaka	IND	115,516	51.77%	Manoranjan Shill Gopal	AL	106,499	47.73%	9,017	4.04%	57.46%
7	Rangpur	Dinajpur-2	349,062	Khalid Mahmud Chowdhury	AL	173,912	91.96%	Anwar Chowdhury Jibon	IND	10,359	5.48%	163,553	86.48%	56.16%
8	Rangpur	Dinajpur-3	392,872	Iqbalur Rahim	AL	108,254	62.15%	Biswajit Ghosh Kanchan	IND	54,038	31.03%	54,216	31.12%	45.69%
9	Rangpur	Dinajpur-4	398,822	Abul Hassan Mahmood Ali	AL	96,447	60.02%	Tariqul Islam Tarique	IND	62,424	38.85%	34,023	21.17%	41.14%
10	Rangpur	Dinajpur-5	450,135	Mostafizur Rahman Fizar	AL	167,428	80.47%	Hazrat Ali Belal	IND	26,482	12.73%	140,946	67.74%	47.98%
11	Rangpur	Dinajpur-6	525,674	Shibli Sadique	AL	182,667	68.24%	Azizul Haque Chowdhury	IND	82,515	30.83%	100,152	37.42%	52.09%
12	Rangpur	Nilphamari-1	429,094	Aftab Uddin Sarkar	AL	1,19,902		Lt Col. (Retd.) Taslim	JP(E)	24,661		95,241		
13	Rangpur	Nilphamari-2	358,791	Asaduzzaman Noor	AL	1,19,565			IND	16,682		1,02,883		
14	Rangpur	Nilphamari-3	275,698	Saddam Hossain Pavel	IND	39,321			IND	25,205		14,116		
15	Rangpur	Nilphamari-4	426,087	Md. Siddiqul Alam	IND									
16	Rangpur	Lalmonirhat-1	376,122	Motahar Hossain	AL									
17	Rangpur	Lalmonirhat-2	402,029	Nuruzzaman Ahmed	AL									
18	Rangpur	Lalmonirhat-3	285,572	Motiar Rahman	AL									
19	Rangpur	Rangpur-1	332,219	Asaduzzaman Bablu	IND	73,927		Mashiur Rahaman Ranga	IND	24,332		49,595		
20	Rangpur	Rangpur-2	357,046	Abul Kalam Md. Ahasanul Hoque Chowdhury	AL									
21	Rangpur	Rangpur-3	494,768	GM Quader	JP(E)	81,861		Rani	IND	23,323		58,538		
22	Rangpur	Rangpur-4	478,383	Tipu Munshi	AL	46,572		Mustafa Salim Bengal	JP(E)	15,631		30,941		
23	Rangpur	Rangpur-5	440,335	Zakir Hossain Sarkar	IND	1,00,979		Rashek Rahman	AL	74,590		26,389		
24	Rangpur	Rangpur-6	329,754	Shirin Sharmin Chaudhury	AL	1,00,835			IND	36,832		64,003		
25	Rangpur	Kurigram-1	529,163	A.K.M. Mostafizur Rahman	JP(E)	88,023			IND	59,756		28,267		
26	Rangpur	Kurigram-2	567,202	Hamidul Haque Khandker	IND	95,609		Ponir Uddin Ahmed	JP(E)	36,948		58,661		
27	Rangpur	Kurigram-3	347,261	Soumendra Prasad Pandey	AL	53,367			IND	35,515		17,852		
28	Rangpur	Kurigram-4	338,406	Md Biplab Hasan	AL	86,658			IND	12,684		73,974		
29	Rangpur	Gaibandha-1	393,044	Abdullah Nahid Nigar	IND	66,463		Shamim Haider Patwary	JP(E)	44,343		22,120		
30	Rangpur	Gaibandha-2	381,969	Abdullah Nahid Nigar	AL									
31	Rangpur	Gaibandha-3	474,876	Umme Kulsum Smrity	AL	57,115			IND	26,382		30,733		
32	Rangpur	Gaibandha-4	439,925	Abul Kalam Azad	AL									
33	Rangpur	Gaibandha-5	362,883	Mahmud Hassan	AL									
34	Rajshahi	Joypurhat-1		Shamsul Alam AB	AL									
35	Rajshahi	Joypurhat-2		Abu Sayeed Al Mahmood Swapon	AL	1,51,128			IND	32,541		1,18,587		
36	Rajshahi	Bogra-1		Shahadara Mannan	AL	51,494		shahajadi Alam Lipi	IND	35,684				
37	Rajshahi	Bogra-2		Shariful Islam Jinnah	JP	36,952								
38	Rajshahi	Bogra-3		Khan Muhammad Saifullah Al Mehdi	IND									
39	Rajshahi	Bogra-4		A. K. M. Rezaul Karim Tansen	JSD									
40	Rajshahi	Bogra-5		Md. Mujibur Rahman (Majnu)	AL									
41	Rajshahi	Bogra-6		Ragebul Ahsan Ripu	AL	53,226			IND	22,840		30,386		
42	Rajshahi	Bogra-7		Md. Mustafa Alam	AL									
43	Rajshahi	Chapai Nawabganj-1		Shamil Uddin Ahmed Shimul	AL									
44	Rajshahi	Chapai Nawabganj-2		Md. Ziaur Rahman	AL									
45	Rajshahi	Chapai Nawabganj-3		Md. Abdul Odud	AL									
46	Rajshahi	Naogaon-1		Sadhan Chandra Majumder	AL	1,87,647			IND	75,721		1,11,926		
47	Rajshahi	Naogaon-2		Election postponed										
48	Rajshahi	Naogaon-3		Sourendra Nath Chakraborty	AL	84,284			IND	40,682		43,602		
49	Rajshahi	Naogaon-4		Brahani Sultan Mahmud	IND	85,180		Md. Nahid Morshed	AL	62,132		23,048		
50	Rajshahi	Naogaon-5		Nizam Uddin Jalil John	AL	1,04,371		Dewan Chekar Ahmed Shishan	IND	52,884		51,487		
51	Rajshahi	Naogaon-6		Omar Faruk	IND	76,660		Anwar Hossain Helal	AL	69,971				
52	Rajshahi	Rajshahi-1		Omor Faruk Chowdhury	AL									
53	Rajshahi	Rajshahi-2		Shafiqur Rahman Badsha	IND	54,906		Fazle Hossain Badsha	AL	31,466		23,440		
54	Rajshahi	Rajshahi-3		Md. Assaduzzaman Assad	AL									
55	Rajshahi	Rajshahi-4		Md. Abul Kalam Azad	AL									
56	Rajshahi	Rajshahi-5		Md. Abdul Wadud	AL									
57	Rajshahi	Rajshahi-6		Md. Shahriar Alam	AL									
58	Rajshahi	Natore-1		Md. Abul Kalam	IND									
59	Rajshahi	Natore-2		Shafiqul Islam Shimul	AL	1,17,844			IND	61,085		56,759		
60	Rajshahi	Natore-3		Zunaid Ahmed Palak	AL	1,35,668			IND	42,914		92,754		
61	Rajshahi	Natore-4		Siddiqur Rahman Patwari	AL									
62	Rajshahi	Sirajganj-1		Tanvir Shakil Joy	AL									
63	Rajshahi	Sirajganj-2		Jannat Ara Henry	AL									
64	Rajshahi	Sirajganj-3		Abdul Aziz	AL	1,17,642			IND	44,708		72,934		
65	Rajshahi	Sirajganj-4		Md. Shafiqul Islam	AL									
66	Rajshahi	Sirajganj-5		Abdul Momin Mondol	AL									
67	Rajshahi	Sirajganj-6		Choyon Islam	AL									
68	Rajshahi	Pabna-1		Shamsul Hoque Tuku	AL	93,300			IND	72,343		20,957		
69	Rajshahi	Pabna-2		Ahmed Firoz Kabir	AL									
70	Rajshahi	Pabna-3		Mokbul Hossain	AL									
71	Rajshahi	Pabna-4		Galibur Rahman Sharif	AL									
72	Rajshahi	Pabna-5		Golam Faruk Khandakar Prince	AL	1,57,260		Tarikul Alam Shadhin	JP(E)	3,316		1,53,944		
73	Khulna	Meherpur-1												
74	Khulna	Meherpur-2												
75	Khulna	Kushtia-1												
76	Khulna	Kushtia-2												
77	Khulna	Kushtia-3												
78	Khulna	Kushtia-4												
79	Khulna	Chuadanga-1												
80	Khulna	Chuadanga-2												
81	Khulna	Jhenaidah-1		Abdul Hyee	AL	95,674			IND	79,728		15,946		
82	Khulna	Jhenaidah-2												
83	Khulna	Jhenaidah-3		Salahuddin Miaji	AL	83,015			IND	64,909		18,106		
84	Khulna	Jhenaidah-4												
85	Khulna	Jessore-1		Sheikh Afil Uddin	AL	1,05,466			IND	19,477		85,989		
86	Khulna	Jessore-2												
87	Khulna	Jessore-3		Kazi Nabil Ahmed	AL	1,21,838		Mohit Kumar Nath	IND	64,710		57,128		
88	Khulna	Jessore-4												
89	Khulna	Jessore-5												
90	Khulna	Jessore-6												
91	Khulna	Magura-1		Shakib Al Hasan	AL	1,85,388				5,973		1,79,415		
92	Khulna	Magura-2		Biren Sikder	AL	1,56,487		Md. Murad Ali	JP(E)	13,265		1,43,222		
93	Khulna	Narail-1												
94	Khulna	Narail-2												
95	Khulna	Bagerhat-1												
96	Khulna	Bagerhat-2		Sheikh Sharhan Naser Tonmoy	AL	1,82,318		Hazra Shahidul Islam	JP(E)	4,174		1,78,144		
97	Khulna	Bagerhat-3												
98	Khulna	Bagerhat-4												
99	Khulna	Khulna-1												
100	Khulna	Khulna-2												
101	Khulna	Khulna-3												
102	Khulna	Khulna-4												
103	Khulna	Khulna-5												
104	Khulna	Khulna-6												
105	Khulna	Satkhira-1												
106	Khulna	Satkhira-2												
107	Khulna	Satkhira-3												
108	Khulna	Satkhira-4												
109	Barisal	Barguna-1												
110	Barisal	Barguna-2												
111	Barisal	Patuakhali-1												
112	Barisal	Patuakhali-2												
113	Barisal	Patuakhali-3		SM Shahjada	AL	94,476			IND	59,024		35,452		
114	Barisal	Patuakhali-4												
115	Barisal	Bhola-1		Tofail Ahmed	AL	1,86,799		Shahjahan Mia	JP(E)	5,980		1,80,819		
116	Barisal	Bhola-2		Ali Azam	AL	1,59,326			IND	3,191		1,56,135		
117	Barisal	Bhola-3		Nurunnabi Chowdhury	AL	1,71,927			IND	17,886		1,54,041		
118	Barisal	Bhola-4		Abdullah Al Islam Jacob	AL	2,46,478		Md. Mizanur Rahman	IND	6,043		2,40,435		
119	Barisal	Barisal-1												
120	Barisal	Barisal-2												
121	Barisal	Barisal-3												
122	Barisal	Barisal-4												
123	Barisal	Barisal-5		Zahid Faruk	AL	97,706			IND	35,370		62,336		
124	Barisal	Barisal-6												
125	Barisal	Jhalokati-1												
126	Barisal	Jhalokati-2												
127	Barisal	Pirojpur-1												
128	Barisal	Pirojpur-2												
129	Barisal	Pirojpur-3												
130	Mymensingh	Jamalpur-1		Nur Mohammad	AL	2,28,247		SM Abu Sayem	JP(E)	6,070		1,67,757		
131	Mymensingh	Jamalpur-2		Md. Faridul Haq Khan	AL	70,762		Mostafa al Mahmud	JP(E)	10,220		60,542		
132	Mymensingh	Jamalpur-3		Mirza Azam	AL	2,76,453		Mir Shamsul Alam Lipton	JP(E)	7,470		2,68,983		
133	Mymensingh	Jamalpur-4		Abdur Rashid	IND	50,678		Mahbubur Rahman	AL	47,638		3,040		
134	Mymensingh	Jamalpur-5		Md. Abul Kalam Azad	AL	2,15,913			IND	65,249		1,50,664		
135	Mymensingh	Sherpur-1												
136	Mymensingh	Sherpur-2		Matia Chowdhury	AL	2,20,142		Saiyad Mohammad Said	IND	5,342		2,14,800		
137	Mymensingh	Sherpur-3												
138	Mymensingh	Mymensingh-1												
139	Mymensingh	Mymensingh-2												
140	Mymensingh	Mymensingh-3												
141	Mymensingh	Mymensingh-4												
142	Mymensingh	Mymensingh-5			IND	52,785		Salahuddin Ahmed Mukti	JP(E)	34,168		18,617		
143	Mymensingh	Mymensingh-6												
144	Mymensingh	Mymensingh-7												
145	Mymensingh	Mymensingh-8		Mahmud Hasan Sumon	IND	56,801		Fakhrul Imam	JP(E)	27,984		28,817		
146	Mymensingh	Mymensingh-9												
147	Mymensingh	Mymensingh-10												
148	Mymensingh	Mymensingh-11												
149	Mymensingh	Netrokona-1		Mushtaq Ahmed Ruhi	AL	1,59,019			IND	25,219		1,33,800		
150	Mymensingh	Netrokona-2		Ashraf Ali Khan Khasru	AL	1,05,353			IND	86,287		19,066		
151	Mymensingh	Netrokona-3		Iftiquar Uddin Talukder Pintu	IND	76,803		Ashim Kumar Ukil	AL	74,550		2,253		
152	Mymensingh	Netrokona-4		Sajjadul Hassan	AL	1,88,068		Liyakat Ali Khan	JP(E)	5,759		1,82,309		
153	Mymensingh	Netrokona-5		Ahmad Hossain	AL	79,647			IND	27,214		49,733		
154	Dhaka	Tangail-1												
155	Dhaka	Tangail-2												
156	Dhaka	Tangail-3												
157	Dhaka	Tangail-4												
158	Dhaka	Tangail-5												
159	Dhaka	Tangail-6												
160	Dhaka	Tangail-7												
161	Dhaka	Tangail-8												
162	Dhaka	Kishoreganj-1												
163	Dhaka	Kishoreganj-2												
164	Dhaka	Kishoreganj-3												
165	Dhaka	Kishoreganj-4												
166	Dhaka	Kishoreganj-5												
167	Dhaka	Kishoreganj-6												
168	Dhaka	Manikganj-1												
169	Dhaka	Manikganj-2												
170	Dhaka	Manikganj-3												
171	Dhaka	Munshiganj-1		Mohiuddin Ahmed	AL	1,02,209			IND	61,980		40,229		
172	Dhaka	Munshiganj-2												
173	Dhaka	Munshiganj-3												
174	Dhaka	Dhaka-1												
175	Dhaka	Dhaka-2												
176	Dhaka	Dhaka-3												
177	Dhaka	Dhaka-4												
178	Dhaka	Dhaka-5												
179	Dhaka	Dhaka-6												
180	Dhaka	Dhaka-7												
181	Dhaka	Dhaka-8												
182	Dhaka	Dhaka-9												
183	Dhaka	Dhaka-10												
184	Dhaka	Dhaka-11												
185	Dhaka	Dhaka-12												
186	Dhaka	Dhaka-13												
187	Dhaka	Dhaka-14												
188	Dhaka	Dhaka-15												
189	Dhaka	Dhaka-16												
190	Dhaka	Dhaka-17												
191	Dhaka	Dhaka-18												
192	Dhaka	Dhaka-19												
193	Dhaka	Dhaka-20		Benzir Ahmed	AL	83,708		Khan Md Israfil Khokon	JP(E)	1,279		82,429		
194	Dhaka	Gazipur-1												
195	Dhaka	Gazipur-2												
196	Dhaka	Gazipur-3												
197	Dhaka	Gazipur-4												
198	Dhaka	Gazipur-5												
199	Dhaka	Narsingdi-1												
200	Dhaka	Narsingdi-2												
201	Dhaka	Narsingdi-3												
202	Dhaka	Narsingdi-4												
203	Dhaka	Narsingdi-5		Rajiuddin Ahmed Raju	AL	1,11,756			IND	64,077		47,679		
204	Dhaka	Narayanganj-1												
205	Dhaka	Narayanganj-2												
206	Dhaka	Narayanganj-3												
207	Dhaka	Narayanganj-4												
208	Dhaka	Narayanganj-5												
209	Dhaka	Rajbari-1												
210	Dhaka	Rajbari-2												
211	Dhaka	Faridpur-1		Abdur Rahman	AL	1,23,331		Arifur Rahman Dolon	IND	84,989		38342		49.69%
212	Dhaka	Faridpur-2		Shahdab Akbar	AL									
213	Dhaka	Faridpur-3		Abdul Kader Azad	IND									
214	Dhaka	Faridpur-4		Mujibur Rahman Chowdhury	IND	1,48,036		Kazi Zafarullah	AL	1,21,036		27,000		
215	Dhaka	Gopalganj-1		Muhammad Faruk Khan	AL									
216	Dhaka	Gopalganj-2		Sheikh Fazlul Karim Selim	AL									
217	Dhaka	Gopalganj-3		Sheikh Hasina	AL	2,49,962			IND	469		2,49,493		
218	Dhaka	Madaripur-1		Noor-E-Alam Chowdhury Liton	AL	1,96,731		Md. Motahar Hossain Siddiqui	JP(E)	1,826		1,94,905		
219	Dhaka	Madaripur-2		Shajahan Khan	AL									
220	Dhaka	Madaripur-3		MST Tahmina Begum	IND									
221	Dhaka	Shariatpur-1		Md Iqbal Hossain	AL									
222	Dhaka	Shariatpur-2		A K M Enamul Hoque Shameem	AL									
223	Dhaka	Shariatpur-3		Nahim Razzaq	AL									
224	Sylhet	Sunamganj-1		Ranjit Chandra Sarkar	AL									
225	Sylhet	Sunamganj-2		Jaya Sen Gupta	AL									
226	Sylhet	Sunamganj-3		M A Mannan	IND									
227	Sylhet	Sunamganj-4		Muhammed Sadique	AL									
228	Sylhet	Sunamganj-5		Mohibur Rahman Manik	AL									
229	Sylhet	Sylhet-1		A K Abdul Momen	AL									
230	Sylhet	Sylhet-2		Shofiqur Rahman Choudhury	AL									
231	Sylhet	Sylhet-3		Habibur Rahman Habib	AL	N/A								
232	Sylhet	Sylhet-4		Imran Ahmad										
233	Sylhet	Sylhet-5		Mohammad Huchamuddin Chowdhury	IND									
234	Sylhet	Sylhet-6		Nurul Islam Nahid	AL									
235	Sylhet	Moulvibazar-1		Md Shahab Uddin	AL									
236	Sylhet	Moulvibazar-2		Shafiul Alam Chowdhury Nadel	AL	73,528		MM Shahin	TBNP	10,575		62,953		
237	Sylhet	Moulvibazar-3		Mohammad Zillur Rahman	AL									
238	Sylhet	Moulvibazar-4		Md Abdus Shahid	AL									
239	Sylhet	Habiganj-1		Amatul Kibria Keya Chowdhury	IND	75,052		M.A. Munim Chowdhury Babu	JP(E)	30,703		44,349		
240	Sylhet	Habiganj-2		Moyj Uddin Sharif	AL									
241	Sylhet	Habiganj-3		Md. Abu Zahir	AL	1,60,605		Abdul Mumin Chowdhury	JP(E)	4,076		1,56,530		
242	Sylhet	Habiganj-4		Sayedul Haque Sumon	IND	1,69,099		Md. Mahbub Ali	AL	69,543		99,556		
243	Chittagong	Brahmanbaria-1		Syed A.K. Ekramuzzaman	IND	89,424		Bodruddoza Md. Farhad Hossain	AL	46,189		43,235		
244	Chittagong	Brahmanbaria-2		Moin Uddin	IND	84,135		Ziaul Haque Mridha	IND	55,281				
245	Chittagong	Brahmanbaria-3		R. A. M. Obaidul Muktadir Chowdhury	AL									
246	Chittagong	Brahmanbaria-4		Anisul Huq	AL	2,20,667			IND	6,586		2,14,081		
247	Chittagong	Brahmanbaria-5		Fayzur Rahman	AL	1,65,635		Md. Mobarak Hossain Dulu	JP(E)	3,378		1,62,257		
248	Chittagong	Brahmanbaria-6		A B Tajul Islam	AL									
249	Chittagong	Comilla-1		Md. Abdus Sabur	AL	1,59,738			IND	23,673		1,36,065		
250	Chittagong	Comilla-2		Md. Abdul Majid	IND									
251	Chittagong	Comilla-3		Jahangir Alam	IND									
252	Chittagong	Comilla-4		Md. Abul Kalam Azad	IND									
253	Chittagong	Comilla-5		M A Jaher	IND									
254	Chittagong	Comilla-6		A.K.M Bahauddin Bahar	AL	132210								
255	Chittagong	Comilla-7		Pran Gopal Datta	AL	1,73,676			IND	11,668		1,62,008		
256	Chittagong	Comilla-8		A.Z.M. Shafiuddin Shamim	AL	2,00,727		H.N.M Irfan	JP(E)	3,721		2,00,006		
257	Chittagong	Comilla-9		Md. Tajul Islam	AL									
258	Chittagong	Comilla-10		AHM Mustafa Kamal	AL									
259	Chittagong	Comilla-11		Mujibul Haque Mujib	AL									
260	Chittagong	Chandpur-1		Salim Mahmud	AL	1,51,383			TBNP	5,734		1,45,649		
261	Chittagong	Chandpur-2		Mofazzal Hossain Chowdhury	AL	1,84,721			IND	13,750		1,70,971		
262	Chittagong	Chandpur-3		Dipu Moni	AL	1,06,566			IND	24,159		82,407		
263	Chittagong	Chandpur-4		Md. Shafiqur Rahman	AL									
264	Chittagong	Chandpur-5		Rafiqul Islam	AL									
265	Chittagong	Feni-1		Alauddin Ahmed Chowdhury	AL									
266	Chittagong	Feni-2		Nizam Uddin Hazar	AL									
267	Chittagong	Feni-3		Masud Uddin Chowdhury	JP(E)									
268	Chittagong	Noakhali-1		H. M. Ibrahim	AL	1,59,291			IND	2,819		1,56, 472		
269	Chittagong	Noakhali-2		Morshed Alam	AL									
270	Chittagong	Noakhali-3		Md. Mamunur Rashid Kiron	AL	56,435		Minhaz Ahmed Jabed	IND	51,885		4,550		
271	Chittagong	Noakhali-4		Ekramul Karim Chowdhury	AL	1,28,764			IND	47,573		81,191		
272	Chittagong	Noakhali-5		Obaidul Quader	AL									
273	Chittagong	Noakhali-6		Mohammad Ali	AL									
274	Chittagong	Lakshmipur-1		Anwar Hossain Khan	AL	40,094		Md. Habibur Rahman Pobon	IND	18,156		21,938		
275	Chittagong	Lakshmipur-2		Mohammad Shahid Islam	IND									
276	Chittagong	Lakshmipur-3		Mohammed Golam Faroque	AL	52,293			IND	35,628		16,665		
277	Chittagong	Lakshmipur-4		Mohammad Abdullah	IND	46,485		Mosharraf Hossain	JSD	33,301		13,184		
278	Chittagong	Chittagong-1		Mahboob Rahman Ruhel	AL	89,064		Md. Gias Uddin	IND	52,995		36,069		
279	Chittagong	Chittagong-2		Khadizatul Anwar	AL	1,02,167			IND	35,639		66,528		
280	Chittagong	Chittagong-3		Mahfuzur Rahaman	AL	55,659			IND	28,656		27,003		
281	Chittagong	Chittagong-4		S.M. Al Mamun	AL	1,42,708		Md. Didarul Kabir	JP(E)	4,880		1,37,828		
282	Chittagong	Chittagong-5		Anisul Islam Mahmud	JP(E)	50,977			IND	36,251		14,726		
283	Chittagong	Chittagong-6		A.B.M. Fazle Karim Chowdhury	AL	2,21,792			IND	3,152		2,18,640		
284	Chittagong	Chittagong-7		Muhammad Hasan Mahmud	AL	1,98,976			IND	9,301		1,89,675		
285	Chittagong	Chittagong-8		Abdus Salam	IND	78,266		Bijoy Kumar Chowdhury	IND	41,530		36,736		
286	Chittagong	Chittagong-9		Mohibul Hasan Chowdhury	AL	1,30,993		Sanjid Rashid Chowdhury	JP(E)	1,982		1,29,011		
287	Chittagong	Chittagong-10		Md Mohiuddin Bacchu	AL									
288	Chittagong	Chittagong-11		M. Abdul Latif	AL	51,494		Ziaul Haque Sumon	IND	46,525		4,969		
289	Chittagong	Chittagong-12		Motaherul Islam Chowdhury	AL									
290	Chittagong	Chittagong-13		Saifuzzaman Chowdhury	AL	1,87,925			IND	5,141		1,82,784		
291	Chittagong	Chittagong-14		Md. Nazrul Islam Chowdhury	AL	71,125			IND	36,884		34,241		
292	Chittagong	Chittagong-15		Abdul Motaleb	IND	85,624		Abu Reza Muhammad Nezamuddin	AL	49,252		36,372		
293	Chittagong	Chittagong-16		Mujibur Rahman	IND	57,499		Abdullah Kabir	IND	32,220		25,279		
294	Chittagong	Cox's Bazar-1		Syed Muhammad Ibrahim	BKP	81,955		Zafar Alam	IND	52,896		29,059		
295	Chittagong	Cox's Bazar-2		Ashek Ullah Rafiq	AL	97,398		Mohammed Sharif Badsha	BNM	34,496				
296	Chittagong	Cox's Bazar-3		Saimum Sarwar Kamal	AL	1,67,029		Mizan Saeed	IND	21,946				
297	Chittagong	Cox's Bazar-4		Shaheen Akhtar	AL	1,25,725		Md. Nurul Bashar	IND	29,929				
298	Chittagong	Khagrachhari		Kujendra Lal Tripura	AL	2,49,736		Mithila Roaza	JP(E)	10,938		2,38,798		
299	Chittagong	Rangamati		Dipankar Talukder	AL	2,71,373		Amar Kumar Dey	BSM	4,965		2,66,408		
300	Chittagong	Bandarban		Bir Bahadur Ushwe Sing	AL	1,72,671		A.T.M. Shahidul Islam	JP(E)	10,361		1,62,310		

== Reactions ==
On 8 January, the day following the general elections, envoys from many countries, including China, India, Russia, Singapore, the Philippines, and Sri Lanka, met and congratulated the Prime Minister at her official residence, Ganabhaban. The envoys expressed their firm conviction to continue supporting Bangladesh, extending greetings on behalf of their respective countries to the Prime Minister. Sheikh Hasina thanked them and sought help in the journey towards the development and prosperity of her country. Additionally, a delegation of Aga Khan Diplomatic Representatives also met her.

=== United States ===
The U.S. Department of State termed the election as not free and fair. The spokesperson of the State Department Mathew Miller said, "The United States shares the view with other observers that these elections were not free or fair and we regret that not all parties participated."

=== European Union ===
The European Union acknowledged the results of Bangladesh's parliamentary elections while expressing regret over the non-participation of all major parties. Emphasizing the importance of democratic values, human rights, and the rule of law in the EU-Bangladesh partnership, they called for a thorough investigation into reported election irregularities. The EU condemned election-related violence, urged respect for the rule of law, and emphasized the need for political pluralism, peaceful dialogue, and media freedom, committing to ongoing collaboration with Bangladesh across various domains.

=== China ===
On 8 January, Yao Wen, China's Ambassador to Bangladesh, was among the first foreign dignitaries to go to newly reelected Sheikh Hasina's residence and congratulate her for winning the election. Local media reported that he said China will support Bangladesh in protecting its sovereignty and in opposing external interference.

=== Japan ===
Japan's election observer mission, led by Masato Watanabe, former Ambassador to Bangladesh, reported some irregularities but overall welcomed the peaceful conduct of the 12th general elections in Bangladesh. Despite incidents of violence during the pre-election period, Japan expresses hope for Bangladesh's progress as a democratic nation, reaffirming its commitment to supporting the country's development and strengthening bilateral ties as a strategic partner.

=== India ===
Prime Minister of India Narendra Modi spoke to Sheikh Hasina and congratulated on her victory for the fourth consecutive term in the parliamentary elections.

Modi then posted on X: "Spoke to Prime Minister Sheikh Hasina and congratulated her on her victory for a historic fourth consecutive term in the Parliamentary elections. I also congratulate the people of Bangladesh for the successful conduct of elections. We are committed to further strengthen our enduring and people-centric partnership with Bangladesh."

=== United Kingdom ===
The Foreign, Commonwealth and Development Office of the United Kingdom claimed the conditions for a "credible, open, and fair competition" were not present in the election and the voters did not have the "fullest range of voting options".

=== Russia ===
Russia congratulated Sheikh Hasina on Awami League's victory in the 12th parliamentary election. Alexander Mantytsky, Ambassador of Russia to Bangladesh, was received by Sheikh Hasina, also Awami League president, at the Ganabhaban. He expressed hope for further cooperation between Russia and Bangladesh, and outlined promising areas of bilateral partnership.

=== Canada ===
Global Affairs Canada, in a statement on 9 January 2024, commended Bangladeshi citizens' democratic aspirations while condemning acts of intimidation and violence during the 7 January parliamentary elections. Expressing disappointment in the electoral process falling short of democratic principles, Canada urged transparent collaboration with all parties to advance democracy, human rights, and fundamental freedoms. As a longstanding supporter of Bangladesh since 1971, Canada "remains committed to fostering a stable, prosperous, and democratic future" for the country.

=== Australia ===
Australia acknowledged the results of Bangladesh's parliamentary elections on 7 January 2024, expressing concern over the limited participation of stakeholders. Highlighting the importance of free and fair elections, Australia condemned the pre-election violence and arrests of political opposition members. Urging Bangladesh to strengthen democratic institutions, Australia reaffirmed its commitment to collaborative efforts for an open, stable, prosperous, and inclusive region.

=== United Nations ===
UN High Commissioner for Human Rights, Volker Türk, expressed concern over Bangladesh's recent elections, citing violence and repression against opposition candidates and supporters. Türk urged the newly elected government, led by Prime Minister Sheikh Hasina, to address human rights concerns and enhance the foundations of an inclusive democracy. The statement highlighted arbitrary detentions, intimidation, enforced disappearances, and political violence in the lead-up to the elections. Türk called for independent investigations into reported incidents, emphasizing the need for fair and transparent trials for those responsible. He stressed the significance of preserving hard-won democracy in Bangladesh and called for comprehensive investigations into campaign-related violations and irregularities.

=== Press coverage of the 2024 national election ===
The news channels in Bangladesh reported some mismanagement in some voting centers of the country, for instance, Jamuna Television reported some underaged kids going to the polls.

== See also ==
- 12th National Parliament Election Process Tracking
- List of members of the 12th Jatiya Sangsad
- 2024 elections in Bangladesh
