= Sheikh Shawkat Hossain Nilu =

Bangladeshi politician (1952–2017)

Sheikh Shawkat Hossain (3 April 1952 – 7 May 2017) was a Bangladeshi politician and chairman of the National People's Party (Bangladesh).

== Early life ==
Sheikh Shawkat Hossain was born in Sheikh Bari of Gimadanga Village of Tungipara Upazila of Gopalganj District into an aristocratic Bengali Muslim family, his father was Sheikh Shahadat Hossain. His family, the Tungipara Sheikh Family was a renowned family in the Faridpur region, having been the former Zamindars of Faridpur Mahakumar. His family was founded by Sheikh Burhanuddin, a businessman who had settled in Tungipara after marrying into the neighbouring Kazi family of the village and purchasing an estate in the area, Sheikh Burhanuddin was a great grandson of Sheikh Abdul Awal, a Dervish likely from Eastern Iran who had come to preach Islam in Bengal through Chittagong as part of a group of Persian missionaries. Sheikh Shawkat Hossain was a distant relative of Sheikh Mujibur Rahman, the founder of Bangladesh, having come from different branches of the same family. As family, Sheikh Shawkat Hossain's immediate family were neighbours with Sheikh Mujibur Rahman's immediate family, Sheikh Shawkat Hossain's father Sheikh Shahadat Hossain was a friend and classmate of Sheikh Mujibur Rahman but eventually favoured the political positions of the Bangladesh Nationalist Party over the Awami League led by Sheikh Mujibur Rahman. Sheikh Shawkat Hossain had an older brother, Sheikh Salahuddin. His nickname in his family was Nilu

== Career ==
Sheikh Shawkat Hossain joined Bangladesh Students' Union in the 1960s. He was the founding Agriculture Secretary of the Bangladesh Nationalist Party. He served as the Student Affairs Secretary to General Ziaur Rahman. He was the Secretary General of the Bangladesh Jatiotabadi Krishak Dal, the farmers' wing of the Bangladesh Nationalist Party.

He led the Progressive Nationalist Party (Progatishil Jatiyabadi Dal) which merged into the Jatiya Party, after Hussain Mohammad Ershad came to power and became a presidium member. He was the head of the Krishak Party, the farmers' unit of the Jatiya Party. He left the Jatiya Party and formed the National Peoples' Party in 2007. His party entered into an alliance with the Bangladesh Nationalist Party.

In September 2014, he was expelled from the Bangladesh Nationalist Party led-alliance after he attended an event at the Gonobhaban hosted by Prime Minister Sheikh Hasina. In response, he created his own alliance, National Democratic Front, with 10 ideologically similar political parties. He was made Secretary General of the alliance.

== Death ==
Sheikh Shawkat Hossain died on 7 May 2017 in Square Hospital, Dhaka, Bangladesh. He was buried in the Banani graveyard.
