= Trinomool BNP =

Bangladeshi political party

Trinomool Bangladesh National Party তৃণমূল বাংলাদেশ জাতীয় দল
- Abbreviation: Trinomool BNP
- Chairperson: Antara Selima Huda
- Founder: Nazmul Huda
- Founded: 20 November 2015
- Registered: 16 February 2023
- Split from: Bangladesh Nationalist Party; Bangladesh Nationalist Front
- Preceded by: Bangladesh Manobadhikar Party
- Headquarters: 15/C (16th floor), 33 Topkhana Road, Paltan, Dhaka
- Student wing: Trinomool Chhatra Dal
- Youth wing: Trinomool Jubo Dal
- Women's wing: Trinomool Mohila Dal
- Ideology: Grassroots democracy; Bangladeshi nationalism; Conservatism (Bangladeshi)
- Political position: Centre to centre-right
- National affiliation: National Democratic Front (2025—present); Bangladesh National Alliance (2015–present); Grand Alliance (2018)
- Colors: Alizarin crimson Kombu green
- Slogan: "Shustho Rajniti- Shushashoner Bhitti" (Bengali) "Healthy politics - Foundation of good governance"
- Bangladesh Parliament: 0 / 350

Election symbol
- "Shonali Aash" (Golden fibre)

Party flag

Trinomool Bangladesh National Party (Bengali: তৃণমূল বাংলাদেশ জাতীয় দল/তৃণমূল বিএনপি), commonly known as the Trinomool BNP, is a political party in Bangladesh founded by former minister Barrister Nazmul Huda in 2015. The party is the fourth to be founded by Huda, and the second to get registered by the Election Commission (EC). Huda first founded BNF after leaving Bangladesh Nationalist Party-BNP, although he was later expelled from BNF. Trinomool BNP had tried to join the ruling Grand Alliance publicly in the past.

The party struggled to get registration from the EC, and the issue even went to the courts. Although as the 2018 general election got held and the party couldn't participate because of being unregistered to EC, the issue became insignificant and remained unsolved. Later on, the EC registered the party in February 2023 following a court verdict ahead of the 12th general election, and the party started preparing to start political activities again. Within 3 days of being registered, the party's chief Nazmul Huda passed away.

The party's responsibility was then taken by his eldest daughter, Antara Selima Huda.
