= Islamic Front Bangladesh =

Bangladeshi political party

Islamic Front Bangladesh ইসলামিক ফ্রন্ট বাংলাদেশ
- Party logo
- Abbreviation: IFB
- President: Allama Sayed Mohammad Bahadur Shah Mujaddedi
- Secretary-General: Abul Bashar Mohammad Zainul Abedin (Zubair)
- Founded: 21 December 1990; 35 years ago
- Registered: 16 November 2008; 17 years ago
- Headquarters: Kabbokash Super Market, 10/5, Plot-3/D, Kawran Bazar, Tejgaon, Dhaka-1215
- Student wing: Islami Chattrasena
- Youth wing: Islamic Jubafront Bangladesh
- Ideology: Islamism; Islamic fundamentalism
- Political position: Far-right
- National affiliation: Greater Sunni Alliance
- Slogan: "To Establish the Society and the state on the basis of the Holy Qur'an and Sunnah"
- Bangladesh Parliament: 0 / 350

Party flag

Website
- http://islamicfrontbd.com/

Islamic Front Bangladesh (Bengali: ইসলামিক ফ্রন্ট বাংলাদেশ), is an Islamist political party in Bangladesh. Registered by Bangladesh Election Commission. It was founded on 21 December 1990.

== History ==
Sayed Bahadur Shah Mujaddedi is the president of the party, and Abul Bashar Mohammad Zainul Abedin (Zubaer) its secretary.

In December 2006, the party aligned itself with the Awami League-led 'Grand Alliance'.

It claimed that Bangladesh Jamaat-e-Islami, the largest Islamist party in Bangladesh before its deregistration, was distorting the religion.

The party is associated with the student group Bangladesh Islami Chhatra Sena.

== Election results ==
=== Jatiya Sangsad elections ===
Election	Party leader	Votes	%	Seats	+/–	Position	Government
2008	Abul Bashar Mohammad Zainul Abedin	1,020	0.00%	0 / 300	New	▲36th	Extra-parliamentary
2014	Abul Bashar Mohammad Zainul Abedin	Boycotted		0 / 300	0	—N/a	Extra-parliamentary
2018	Abul Bashar Mohammad Zainul Abedin	31,468	0.04%	0 / 300	0	▲16th	Extra-parliamentary
2024	Abul Bashar Mohammad Zainul Abedin	18,488	0.05%	0 / 300	0		Extra-parliamentary

== See also ==
- List of Islamic political parties
