= Shaheen Akhtar =

Bangladeshi writer (born 1962)

- Born: February 1962 (age 64); Cumilla, Bangladesh
- Education: University of Dhaka

Shaheen Akhtar (Bengali: শাহীন আখতার; born 1962) is a Bangladeshi writer.

== Biography ==
She was born in Cumilla and studied economics at University of Dhaka. She next studied and worked at film-making in India, returning to Bangladesh in 1991. She used to write short stories when she was younger.

Her first novel was Palabar Path Nei (No Escape Route), a story that explored the life of two single women in Dhaka. Shaheen’s second novel Talaash won the Prothom Alo Best Book of the Year Award for 2004. For this novel She also won the 3rd Asian Literary Award-2020, a major prize in South Korea, Talaash (Eng: The Search, trans. Ella Dutta), translated into Korean by Seung Hee Jeon. Talaash (The Search) is about birangana (literally heroic women) of Bangladesh - women who were raped during the liberation war in 1971.

Her short stories have been published in Words without Border and other prestigious literary magazines. Shaheen’s works have been translated into English, German, and Korean.

She works as an editor in the Media and Communication Unit of Ain o Salish Kendra, a civil rights organization in Dhaka.

== Selected works ==
- Talaash (The Search), novel, translated into English in 2011
- Shokhi Rongomala (Beloved Rongomala), novel, translated into English in 2018
- Moyur Shinghashon (Peacock Throne), novel
- Ashukhi din (Unhappy days), novel
- Boner Shange Amarloke (Sisters in eternity), short stories
- Poneroti Golpo (Fifteen stories), short stories
- Shish o Onnyanno Golpo, short stories
- Soti O Swotontora: Bangla Shahitye Nari, editor
- Zenana Mehfil: Bangali Musalman Lekhikader Nirbachita Rachana, 1904-1938 (Women in Concert: An Anthology of Bengali Muslim Women's Writings, 1904–1938), editor with Mousumi Bhowmik

== Awards ==
- Bangla Academy Literary Award (2015)
- Asian Literary award (2020)
- Gemcon Literary Award (2019)
- Akhteruzzaman Elias Kothashahitya Puroshkar 2015
- IFIC Bank Puroshkar2015
