= Bangladesh Sangskritik Muktijote =

Political party of Bangladesh

Bangladesh Sangskritik Muktijote বাংলাদেশ সাংস্কৃতিক মুক্তিজোট
- President: Abu Layes Munna
- Founded: November 2, 1997; 28 years ago (established); November 24, 2000; 25 years ago (launched)
- Trade union: Bangladesh Labor Muktijote
- Farmers wing: Bangladesh Farmers Muktijote
- Ideology: Culturalism Progressivism; Social liberalism; Secularism (Bangladeshi)
- Political position: Centre-left
- Bangladesh Parliament: 0 / 350

Election symbol
- Cane

Party flag
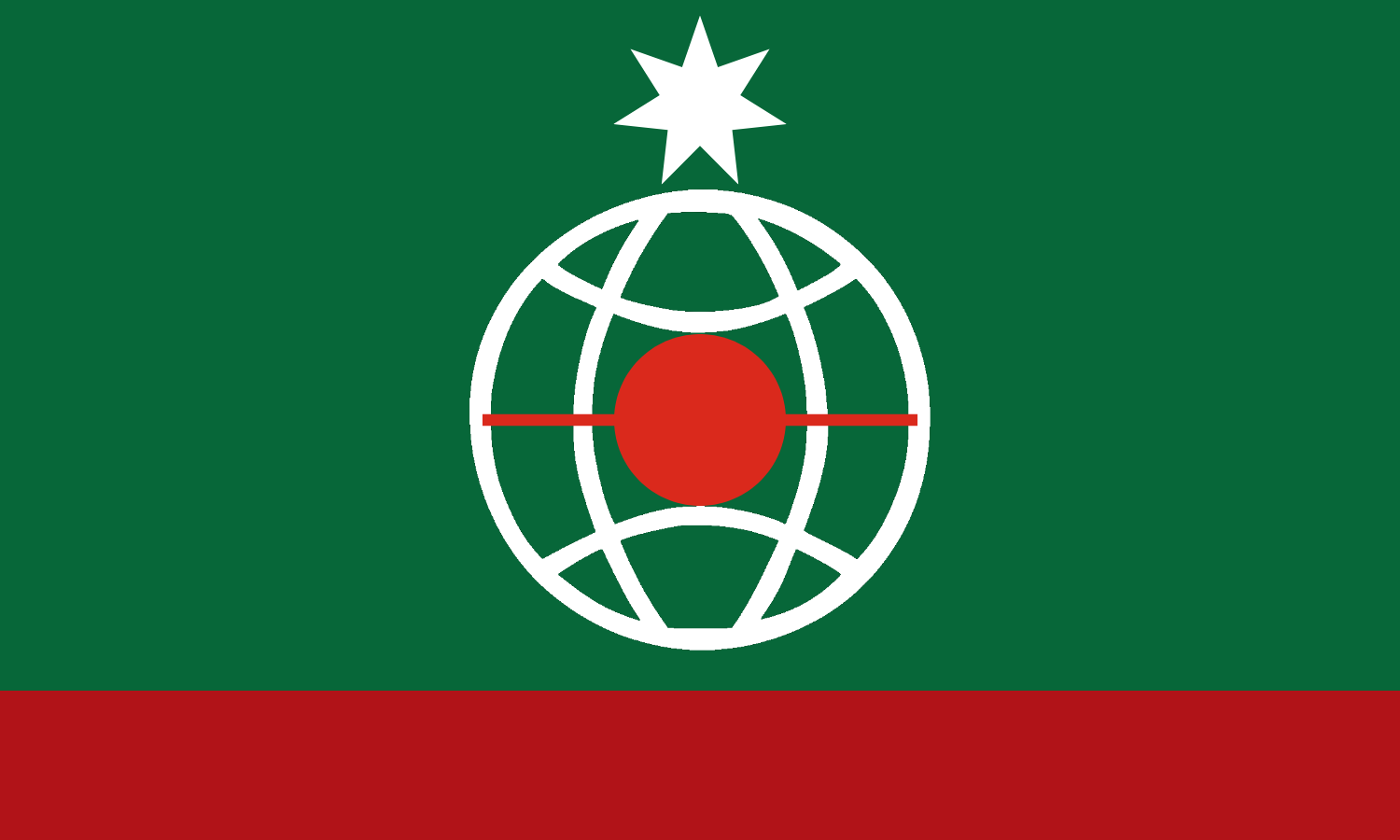

Bangladesh Sangskritik Muktijote (Bengali: বাংলাদেশ সাংস্কৃতিক মুক্তিজোট, lit. 'Bangladesh Cultural Liberation Alliance') is a political party in Bangladesh.

== History ==
On 2 November 1997, Bangladesh Sangskritik Muktijote was established and on 24 November 2000, it was officially launched as a political organization.

On 8 October 2013, It achieved registration with the Bangladesh Election Commission.
