= Bangladesh Supreme Party =

Political party in Bangladesh

Bangladesh Supreme Party বাংলাদেশ সুপ্রিম পার্টি
- Abbreviation: BSP
- President: Syed Saifuddin Ahmed Maizbhandari
- Founded: January 11, 2019; 7 years ago
- Headquarters: Shah Ali Bagh, Mirpur-1, Dhaka-1216
- Ideology: Liberalism; Bengali nationalism; Sufism; Islamic democracy
- Political position: Far-right
- Religion: Sunni Islam
- National affiliation: Greater Sunni Alliance
- Bangladesh Parliament: 0 / 350

Election symbol
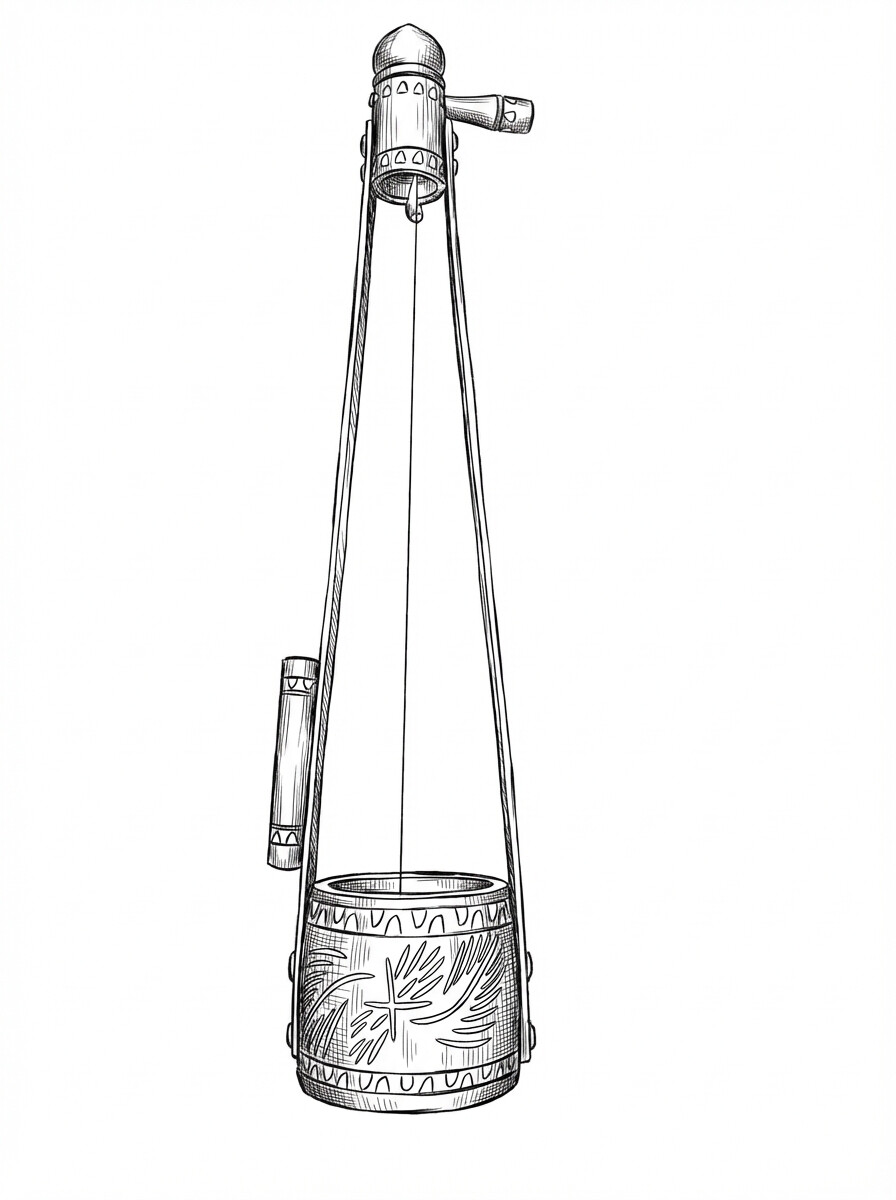
- Ektara

Party flag
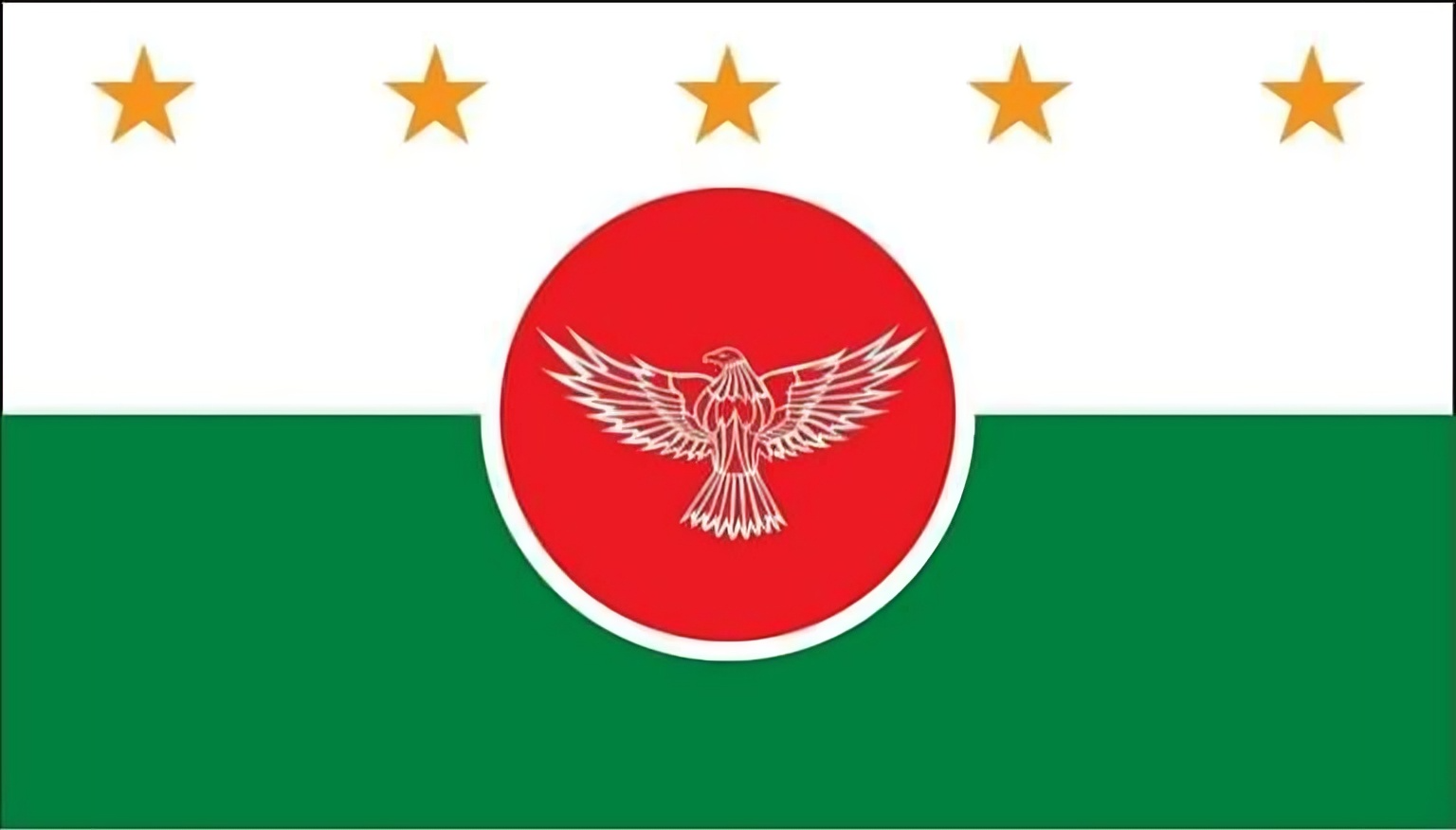

Website
- bangladeshsupremeparty.org

Bangladesh Supreme Party (Bengali: বাংলাদেশ সুপ্রিম পার্টি, lit. 'Bangladesh Supreme Party') (BSP) is a political party in Bangladesh. It was established in 2019.

It has 500 district and sub-district offices throughout the country. The HQ of the party is located in 82 Shah Ali Bagh, Mirpur-1, Dhaka-1216.

== History ==
On 11 January 2019, the Bangladesh Supreme Party (BSP) was established.

During the COVID-19 pandemic, the organization distributed relief goods and sanitizers, PPEs.

In 2023, the Bangladesh Supreme Party and the Bangladesh Nationalist Movement were registered as political parties and received approval from the Bangladesh Election Commission.

== Ideology ==
The party is somewhat liberal and supports communal harmony and equal representation and it led an 9-party Liberal Islamic Alliance.
