= Bangladesh Nationalist Movement =

Bangladesh Nationalist Movement - BNM
- Founded: 2021
- Headquarters: House No. H-23, Shaheed Bir Uttam Ziaur Rahman Road/New Airport Road, Mohakhali, Banani, Dhaka-1212
- Colours: Red, Green, Yellow

Election symbol
- Anchor

The Bangladesh Nationalist Movement (BNM) is a political party in Bangladesh. The party was officially registered with the Election Commission of Bangladesh on August 10, 2023. The party's symbol is an anchor. The convenor and founding president of the party is Dr. Abdur Rahman, while the member secretary is Major (Retd.) Muhammad Hanif.

== Current Status ==
BNM is a newly established political party, and it has yet to build a strong foundation. The party is still striving to gain recognition among the people. However, it has achieved some milestones. In August 2023, the party was registered with the Election Commission. In the 2024 parliamentary elections, the party fielded candidates in 82 constituencies.
