= Bangladesh Congress =

Political party in Bangladesh

Bangladesh Congress বাংলাদেশ কংগ্রেস
- President: Kazi Rezaul Hossain
- Secretary-General: Md. Earul Islam
- Founded: 2013; 13 years ago
- Headquarters: Happy Rahman Plaza, Kazi Nazrul Islam Avenue, Banglamotor, Dhaka
- Ideology: Liberalism (Bangladeshi); Economic liberalism Secularism (Bangladeshi)
- Political position: Centre

Election symbol
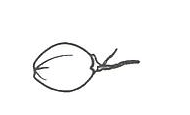
- "Coconut"

Party flag

The Bangladesh Congress (Bengali: বাংলাদেশ কংগ্রেস) is a political party in Bangladesh, founded in 2013.

== History ==
The Bangladesh Congress was founded in March 2013. Adv. Kazi Rezaul Hossain is the president of the party. Md. Earul Islam is its secretary general. This party was registered by the Bangladesh Election Commission on 9 May 2019 as per the direction of the Appellate Division of the Supreme Court of Bangladesh.

== Electoral results ==
The Bangladesh Congress has never gained a seat in the Bangladesh Parliament. In the 2019 Bogra-6 by-election, it received 0.3% of the vote. In 2020, it contested three by-elections, gaining 0.1% of the vote in each of Dhaka-10, Dhaka-5, and Dhaka-18. It did better in the 2021 Sylhet-3 by-election, in which it received 0.5% of the vote.

== See also ==
- Politics of Bangladesh
- List of political parties in Bangladesh
