= Kanon Ara Begum =

Bangladeshi politician

- কানন আরা বেগম

Member of the Bangladesh Parliament for Reserved women's seat-41
- In office 28 February 2024 – 6 August 2024
- Preceded by: Sharifa Quader

Personal details
- Born: 25 June 1964 (age 61)
- Party: Bangladesh Awami League

Kanon Ara Begum (born 25 June 1964) is a Ganatantri Party politician and a former Jatiya Sangsad member from a women's reserved seat. She was a member of the Chattogram Zila Parishad.
