= National People's Party (Bangladesh) =

Bangladeshi political party

National People's Party ন্যাশনাল পিপলস পার্টি
- Abbreviation: NPP
- Chairman: AZM Fariduzzaman Farhad
- Founder: Sheikh Shawkat Hossain Nilu
- Founded: July 19, 2007; 19 years ago
- Headquarters: 5th Floor, Sharif Complex, Purana Paltan, Dhaka
- Youth wing: National People's Jubo Party
- Ideology: Bangladeshi nationalism
- Political position: Centre-left
- Bangladesh Parliament: 0 / 350

Election symbol
- Mango

Party flag
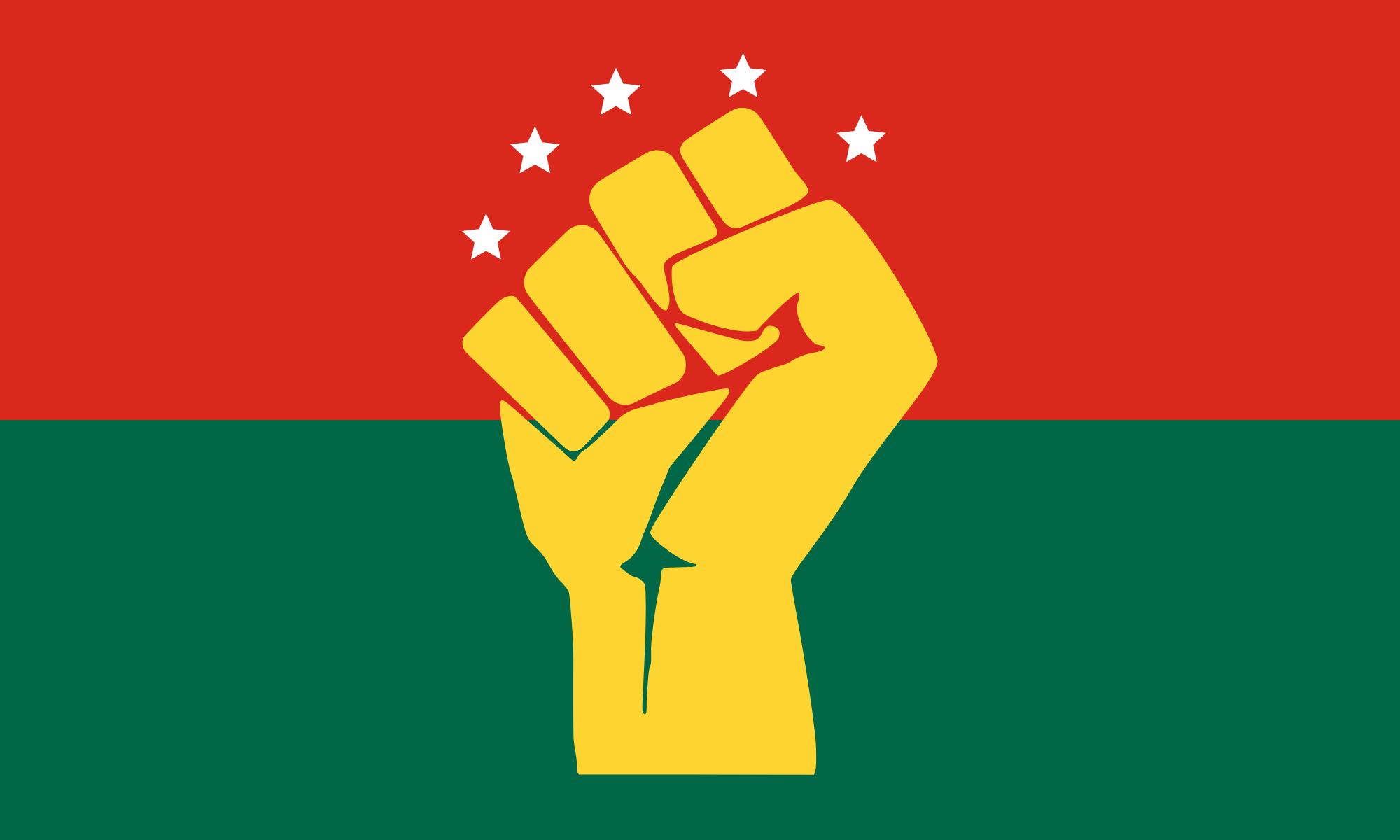

Website
- https://bangladeshpeoplesparty.org

National People's Party (Bengali: ন্যাশনাল পিপলস পার্টি, romanized: National People's Party) (NPP) is a political party in Bangladesh. The party was established in 2007 and used to be part of the BNP-led 20 Party Alliance.

== History ==
On 19 July 2007, the party was established and a 151-member committee was announced. The party was established by former Jatiya Party leader Sheikh Shawkat Hossain Nilu and the party was initially composed of members and leaders of Jatiya Party (Ershad), Bangladesh Nationalist Party, Bangladesh Jatiotabadi Chatradal, Jatiya Samajtantrik Dal, JaSaD Chhatra League.

In 2014 after Nilu joined Sheikh Hasina's Iftar party in Ganabhaban, he was kicked from the party and NPP split into 2 factions.

On 3 December 2022, National People's Party declared a 171-member central executive committee.

== Ideology ==
The party is alleged to be supportive of Bangladeshi nationalism, social progressivism, and democracy.

== Participation in elections ==
the National People's Party participated in the 2008 Bangladeshi general election with around 30 candidates and got 10,348 votes and the 2018 Bangladeshi general election, In both of the elections that it participated in, the party faced a devastating defeat and had their security deposits seized.

== Affiliate organisations ==
- National People's Jubo Party
