= Kanchana Union =

Kanchana Union কাঞ্চনা ইউনিয়ন
- Union
- Location in Bangladesh
- Coordinates: 22°7′N 92°0.5′E
- Country: Bangladesh
- Division: Chittagong Division
- District: Chittagong District

Government
  - Union Chairman: Ramjan Ali

Area
  - Total: 13.53 km^{2} (5.22 sq mi)

Population (2011)
  - Total: 21,575
  - Density: 1,600/km^{2} (4,100/sq mi)
- Time zone: UTC+6 (BST)
- Post code: 4386
- Website: kanchanaup.chittagong.gov.bd

Kanchana Union (Bengali: কাঞ্চনা ইউনিয়ন) is a union parishad of Satkania Upazila in the division of Chittagong, Bangladesh.

== Geography ==
The union has a total area of 13.53 km^{2} or 5.22 sq miles.

Kanchana Union is located in the western part of Satkania Upazila. The distance from this union to Upazila Sadar is about 15 kilometers. It is bounded on the north by Charoti Union and Amilaish Union, on the east by Amilaish Union and Eochia Union, on the south by Eochia Union and on the west by Eochia Union and Sadhanpur Union of Banshkhali Upazila.

The Gaharchari Canal, Burachari Canal and Eochia Chara Canal are flowing over Kanchana Union.

== Population ==
As of 2011, the union total population is 21,275. Male is 10,164 and female is 11,411.

== Naming and history ==
It is said that in ancient times, the village was attracted by its natural beauty, economic prosperity and the abode of spiritual pursuits. They wanted to buy the village from the people of the village at the price of kanchan. Bengali kanchan means gold. But the villagers did not want to hand over the freedom in exchange for Kanchan or gold. On the one hand, the Auliya saints want to pay Kanchan as the price of the village and on the other hand, the people of the village do not respond, Bengali means "Na". Finally, Kanchan and Na merge with Kanchana.

== Administrative area ==
Kanchana Union is 4th union of Satkania Upazila. The union administrative activities are under Satkania police station. It is part of Jatiya Sangsads 292 constituency Chittagong-15. It consists of Kanchana mouza. The villages of this union are:

1. South Kanchana
2. Middle Kanchana
3. North Kanchana

== Education ==
Kanchana Union has a literacy rate of 49.31%, The union has 3 secondary schools, 3 madrasas and 9 primary schools.

Madrasa

- Kanchana Anwarul Ulum Islamia Alia Madrasa
- South Kanchana Shah Rashidia Islamia Dhakil Madrasa
- Darul Ihsan Women Dhakil Madrasa

Secondary school

- Amilaish Kanchana Bonga Chandra Ghosh Institute
- Kanchana Girls High School
- South Kanchana Nur Ahmed Chowdhury High School

Primary School

- North Kanchana Kamal Uddin Government Primary School
- North Kanchana Government Primary School
- Kanchana A I Government Primary School
- Kanchana Palpara Government Primary School
- Kanchana Girls Primary School
- Kanchana Government Primary School
- South Kanchana Gurguri Government Primary School
- Bokshirkhil Model Government Primary School
- Middle Kanchana Government Primary School

== Religious places ==
Kanchana Union has 18 mosques, 5 Eidgahs and 5 temples.

== Places of interest ==
- Traditional Kazi Jame Mosque

== Notable residents ==
- Alamgir Muhammad Serajuddin - Ekushey Padak recipient and Bangladeshi academic.
- Asif Iqbal - Bangladeshi lyricist and composer.
- B. M. Faizur Rahman - Bangladeshi politician and freedom fighter

== Chairman ==
- Present chairman: Ramjan Ali

List of all Chairman

Serial	Chairman name	period
1	Syed Rafiqur Rahman	1958-1962
2	Abdur Rahim	1963-1967
3	B. M. Faizur Rahman	1968-1969
4	Nur Ahmed	1970-1972
5	Furak Ahmed	1973-1977
6	Abdul Hakim	1978
7	Jahirul Haque	1978-1982
8	Anowerul Haque Kaderi	1983-1987
9	Ataur Rahman	1988-1991
10	Anowerul Haque Kaderi	1992-1997
11	Ataur Rahman	1998-2000
12	Abu Shah Alam Ledu	2001-2002
13	Maulana Mujaffar Ahmed	2003-2016
14	Ramjan Ali	2016–present

== See also ==
- Madarsha Union
- Eochia Union
