= Dharmapur Union =

Dharmapur Union may refer to the following unions in Bangladesh:

- Dharmapur Union, Noakhali, Noakhali District
- Dharmapur Union, Fatikchhari, Chittagong District
- Dharmapur Union, Feni, Feni District
- Dharmapur Union, Satkania, Satkania Upazila, Chittagong District
- Dharmapur Union, Birol, Dinajpur District, Bangladesh
