= Boli Khela =

Traditional form of wrestling

Boli Khela (বলি খেলা)
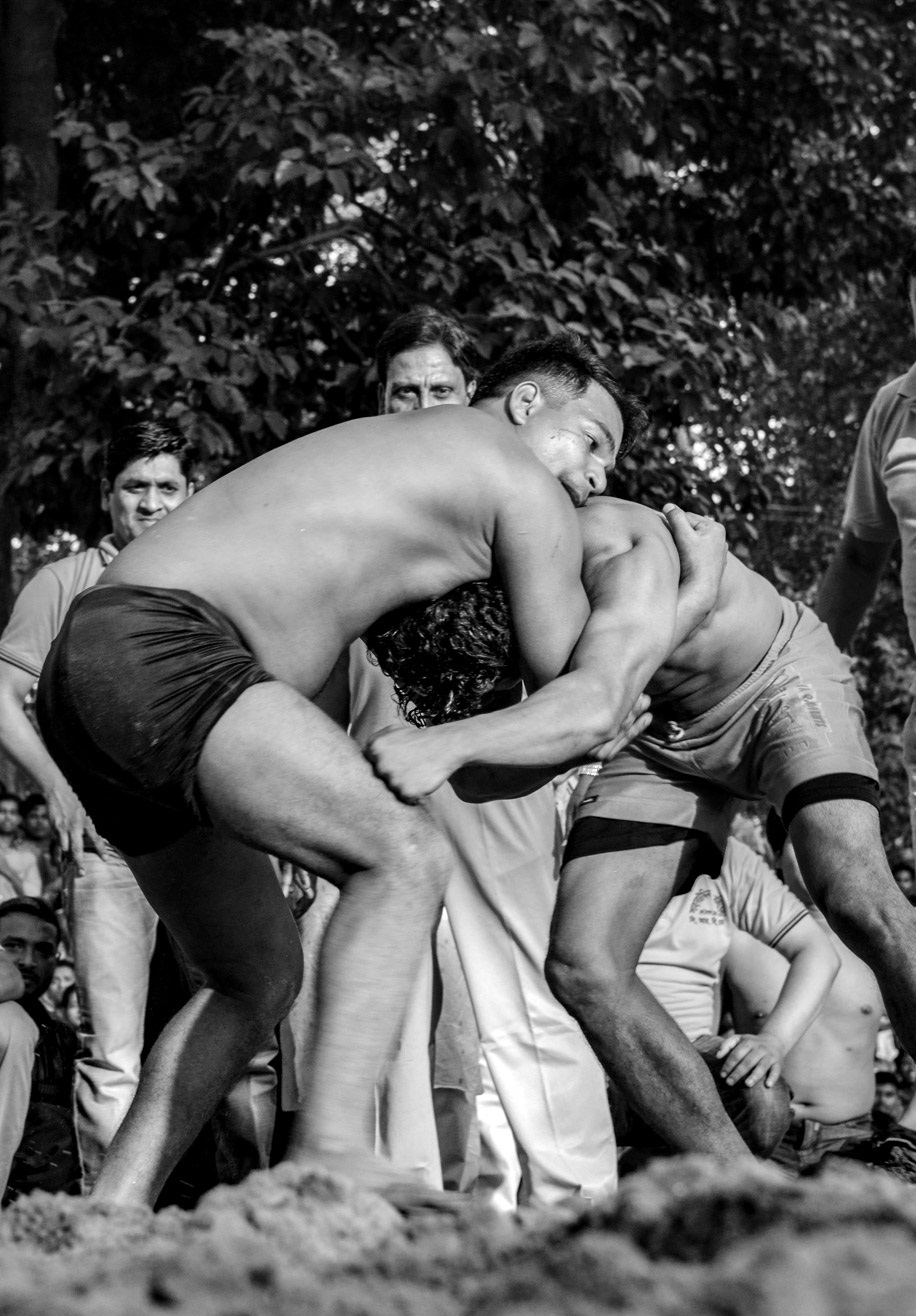
- Two players (boli) playing Boli khela in Chittagong
- Focus: Grappling
- Hardness: Full Contact
- Country of origin: Bangladesh
- Famous practitioners: Didarul Alam, Marma Singh
- Parenthood: Historic
- Olympic sport: No

Boli Khela, also known as Bali Khela (Bengali: বলীখেলা), and popularly known as Jobbarer Boli Khela (Bengali: জব্বারের বলীখেলা), is a traditional form of wrestling in Bangladesh. It is particularly popular in the Chittagong region, where it is regarded as the district's traditional national sport. This combat sport incorporates grappling techniques such as clinch fighting, throws and takedowns, joint locks, pins, and other grappling holds. It is one of Chittagong's oldest traditions. The event is held on the 7th day of the first month of the Bengali calendar at Madarsha Union as Mokkaro Boli Khela, and on the 12th day of the same month at Laldighi Maidan as Jabbarer Boli Khela.

== Etymology ==
In the Chittagonian dialect, Boli means "wrestler" or "a powerful person," while Khela means "game" or "sport." Thus, Boli Khela literally translates to "game of the powerful person.".

== History ==
Boli Khela was introduced in the 19th century by Kader Boxo, a landlord and resident of Satkania Upazila in the Madarsha Union of Chittagong District. Starting in 1879, he collected rent from his tenants each year and organized a Boli Khela match. After his death, the 7th of Boishakh (the first month of the Bengali calendar) became known as "Mokkaro Boli Khela."

The sport was popularized in the early 20th century by Abdul Jabbar Saodagor of Chittagong. It gained widespread appeal after World War I but declined after World War II.

The event was not held in 2020 or 2021 due to the COVID-19 pandemic. After two years, the 113th edition of the historic Jobbarer Boli Khela took place in Chattogram on 24 April 2022, followed by the 114th edition on 25 April 2023.

== Participation ==
The arena is circular or square, measuring at least fourteen to twenty feet across. Instead of using modern mats, Boli wrestlers train and compete on dirt floors. Matches begin on a sandy wrestling ground. Each year, Boli Khela attracts new participants and fans, serving as a spectator sport for local residents and enthusiasts while also demonstrating traditional wrestling techniques to the public.

== Format ==
Events are divided into tournament sessions. Each match typically lasts 25–30 minutes, but if both competitors agree, the final match may be extended by 10–15 minutes.

== Competitions ==
Mokkar Boli Khela

Jobbarer Boli Khela

== See also ==
Kabaddi

Lathi khela

Boli – The Wrestler (film)
