= Barua people =

Chittagonian-speaking ethnic group in the Indian subcontinent

Barua Magh
বড়ুয়া মঘ
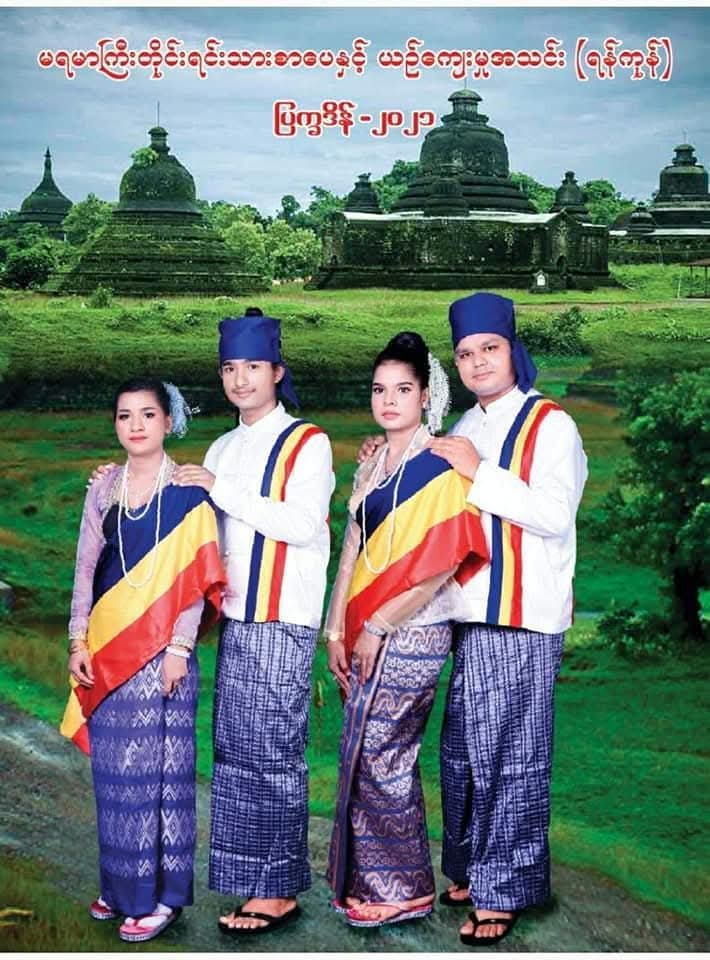
- Traditional costume of Magh Barua or Maramagyi people

Total population
- 1.2 million

Regions with significant populations
- Bangladesh; Myanmar; India

Languages
- Chittagonian, Bengali, Rakhine

Religion
- Theravada Buddhism

Related ethnic groups
- Jummas, Rakhine

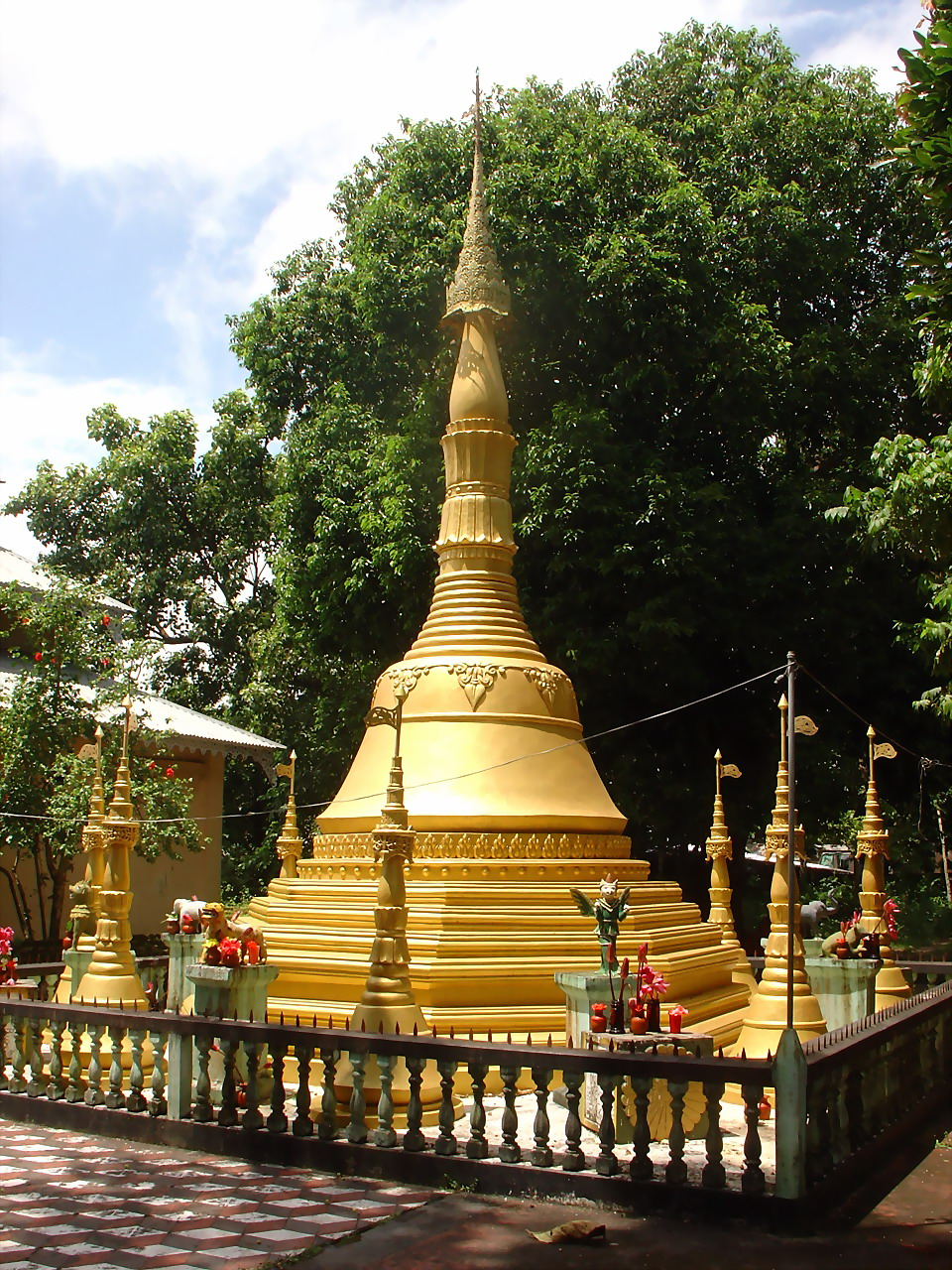
Buddhist temple on Maheshkhali Island

The Barua (Chittagonian: বড়ুয়া, romanized: Boṛua; Rakhine: မရမာကြီး) are a Magh ethnic group who live in Chittagong Division in Bangladesh, West Bengal in India, and Rakhine State in Myanmar, where they are known as the Maramagyi or Maramagri, or particularly the Magh Barua. According to Arakanese chronology, the Barua Buddhists have lived in Myanmar for over 5,000 years. In Myanmar, Barua Maghs are classified as one of the seven ethnic groups that make up the Rakhine ethnic group. In West Bengal (India), the Baruas are known as Magh and are recognised as Scheduled Tribe (ST). Magh is the general term used for Buddhists in the Southeastern Bengal and Arakanese region.

== Etymology ==
The word 'Barua' is derived from Arakanese words: "Bo" (meaning Army Chief) and "Yoya" (meaning locality or village). Literally, Barua means "the place where an army chief resides." Over time, the people who lived in such a locality or village came to be known as Barua. Since the people of Bengal were unable to pronounce the Burmese or Arakanese words, the word Boyoya was replaced by the word Barua. In the past, the title Barua was probably not used by them.They started to use this title more during the last quarter of the eighteenth century to obscure their social identity in order to avoid persecution and social discrimination from the King Bodowpaya of Burma who destroyed the kingdom of Arakan in 1785.

== History ==
In the ancient history of Rakhine Razawin, around the middle of the second century AD (146 AD), a vassal of the Magadh's Chandra Surya Kingdom established a territory in Arakan and Chittagong. He and his subjects, along with soldiers, established the capital in Dhanyawadi. These settlers played a key role in spreading Buddhism and its culture in Chittagong and Arakan. The settlers from Magadh (an ancient Indian kingdom in Southern Bihar), along with local inhabitants in Chittagong, embraced Buddhism and came to be known as ‘Mag’ or ‘Magh’. By 1585, European, Persian, and Bengali accounts began describing all the Buddhist groups in the region as the Mugh or Maghs.

According to historical accounts, particularly the Maharazawan, the Baruas date their settlement in Chittagong to the period of political upheaval following the death of Sri Sudhamma, the king of Arakan. After his minister Narapati usurped the throne, several nobles and royal family members fled to Kantha in Chittagong. Approximately 50,000 of the 100,000 guards stationed in Mrauk U deserted and accompanied a priest, later settling in Kantha under Narapati. The Baruas claim descent from these immigrants. The governor of Kantha was subsequently referred to as the king of Maramagyi, a title the Arakanese continued to apply to the Barua Maghs. The term Maramagyi is believed to be a corruption of Brahmagri, combining Mrama (or Brahma, used by Aryan settlers to denote early inhabitants of Burma) and gri (great).

Descriptions by European writers like Risley (1891), Hunter and O’Malley (O’Malley 1908), and present-day discussions by Sukomal Chaudhuri (Chaudhuri 1982), Ram Chandra Barua (Barua 2010) reveal that 'Magh' and 'Buddhism' are synonymously treated in Chittagong.

Today, non-Buddhists in Chittagong often consider the terms ‘Magh’ and Buddhists to be synonymous. It is also agreed that those belonging to the ‘Magh’ community are divided into several groups:

1. Thongtha, Thongcha, Jumia Mags
2. Marma, Mayamma, Roang or Rakhaing Magh
3. Maramagri, Maramagyi or otherwise called Barua Magh.

They belong to the second sub-tribe or group within the Magh community.

Baruas or Maramagyis were known as Plain Maghs or true Maghs of Chittagong, whereas the other two groups i.e., Thongtha and Marma were known as hill maghs. The Marmas considered these names to be pejorative because of the word's association with piracy, however, Baruas of West Bengal, India and Myanmar continue to identify themselves as Magh and Maramagyi respectively.

=== Origin ===
The Baruas are of mixed ethnic background. Barua Maghs was the name given to the Bengali-speaking Arakanese who had migrated north of the Naf River into southern Chittagong after the Burmese king conquered Arakan in 1785. As these populations resettled across Chittagong and other parts of Bengal, many Arakanese men married Bengali women and the descendants of these families were known as Barua Maghs. In the view of Hunter (1876), “the Baruas have originated as a result of matrimonial alliances between the Arakanese father and women of lower castes of Bengal and their physiognomy and cultural traits bear it out.” Hunter further described that the Baruas are of Burmese descent.

== Culture ==
=== Magh cooks ===
The British built railways to expand the tea and Burma teak trade, ferrying goods, passengers, British sahibs, and zamindars. Magh Baruas, who were inherently exceptional cooks, were able to understand European recipes and adapt them with a touch of their own. Since Maghs were Buddhists and had no qualms about preparing pork or beef, they were employed by the British on steamers. The delicacies made by Magh Barua cooks eventually found their way into the colonial clubs of Kolkata.

The Magh Baruas were appointed by the British and the affluent households of babus like the Shobhabazar Rajbari. Raja Nabakrishna Deb and his family often entertained British officials, and on such occasions, the Magh cooks were called in to prepare various European delicacies for the British. Maghs also traditionally serve as cooks in buddhist temples. The Maghs thus found a steady source of income through their culinary expertise, with recipes being passed down for generations.

=== Connection with the Arakanese or Rakhine ===
In early times, most of the family names of the Magh Baruas were akin to the old Arakanese, for example: Mulaim, Chidayim, Lebaim, Hachagri, Annakka Phungi, Mimagri, Lualamba, Kamamsu, Kayanca, Dhumsam, Hosam, Kailangri, Roaja, Keja, Rambata, Cotta-Chattam, Chattam-suyana, Laoyela, Telam, Mocatelam, Hresa, Thanja, Acekkal, Phulakdalu, etc. In addition, old Arakanese personal names were also seen among the Baruas in the past. Some examples are: Mam-pru, Manca-pru, Toaila-pru, Cailapru, Hoa-pru, Keja-pru, Hrepa-pru, Anga-pru, Mayu-pru, Kalam-pru, Maha-pru and Aikyajaim.

Even today, the Magh Barua community uses many Arakanese words in their daily life, such as phara (phaya-The Buddha), ataim-mang (Bengali pansalla or meeting), letha (from lethajin), phang (invitation to the monk), choyaim (offering food), khiong (temple), chadam, chabaik (eating pot), wa (rainy retreat), waik and gheing (ordination place). Moreover, by tradition, the Baruas used to maintain Magi Era, instead of the Bengali Era (San) or Christian Era, similar to the people of Arakan. At the same time, the dietary habits and culture of the Barua community of certain villages, mainly Mohamuni and Ranihat/Ichamati of Bangladesh resemble Southeast Asian food practices like those of Arakan.

=== Marriage ===
The Barua traditional marriage customs are influenced by local practices. They recognise two main ceremonies: Cholanta Bivaha, held at the bride's home, and Tokemanta Bivaha, conducted at the groom's home, with the latter being more common. Certain months, such as Caitra and Paus, are considered inauspicious for weddings, possibly due to agricultural activities. Pre-wedding ceremonies include Ashirbad, Bostra-Alonkar Chorani (engagement), Pan-Mita, Jorani Bhat, Pan-Salla, Tele-Chorani (turmeric ceremony), Boron Khula, Panchaila prarthana (prayer to Lord Buddha) and Vandana (Prayer to Monk) to the present Bhikkhu Sangha and offerings to household deities. The wedding involves a Barjatri procession, monastic blessings, haala geet (done by women) and protective chants. Social marriages are preferred, while divorce is rare but permitted. Polygamy and child marriage are prohibited, and interfaith unions are uncommon.

=== Festivals ===
The Baruas observe Buddha Purnima, Madhu Purnima, Prabarana Purnima, and Kaṭhina Chivara Dana (offering robes to monks). The Baruas also worship their ancestors and gram (village) devata (image of a deity) for their peace and survival. Besides these festivals, the Biu-paraw or Cait-paraw and Nababash are also the most popular festivals among the Baruas of Bangladesh. Biu paraw or Cait-paraw is held the last two days of the month of Caitra. This festival is not only popular among the Baruas and Buddhists of Bangladesh, but also in the Southeast and South Asian countries of Burma, Sri Lanka and Thailand.

Cultural practices are linked to these festivals, such as Fanus (lantern releases), Sadang (village fairs), Anno Prason (child rice-feeding ceremonies), and Haala geet (a women's event).

== Religion ==
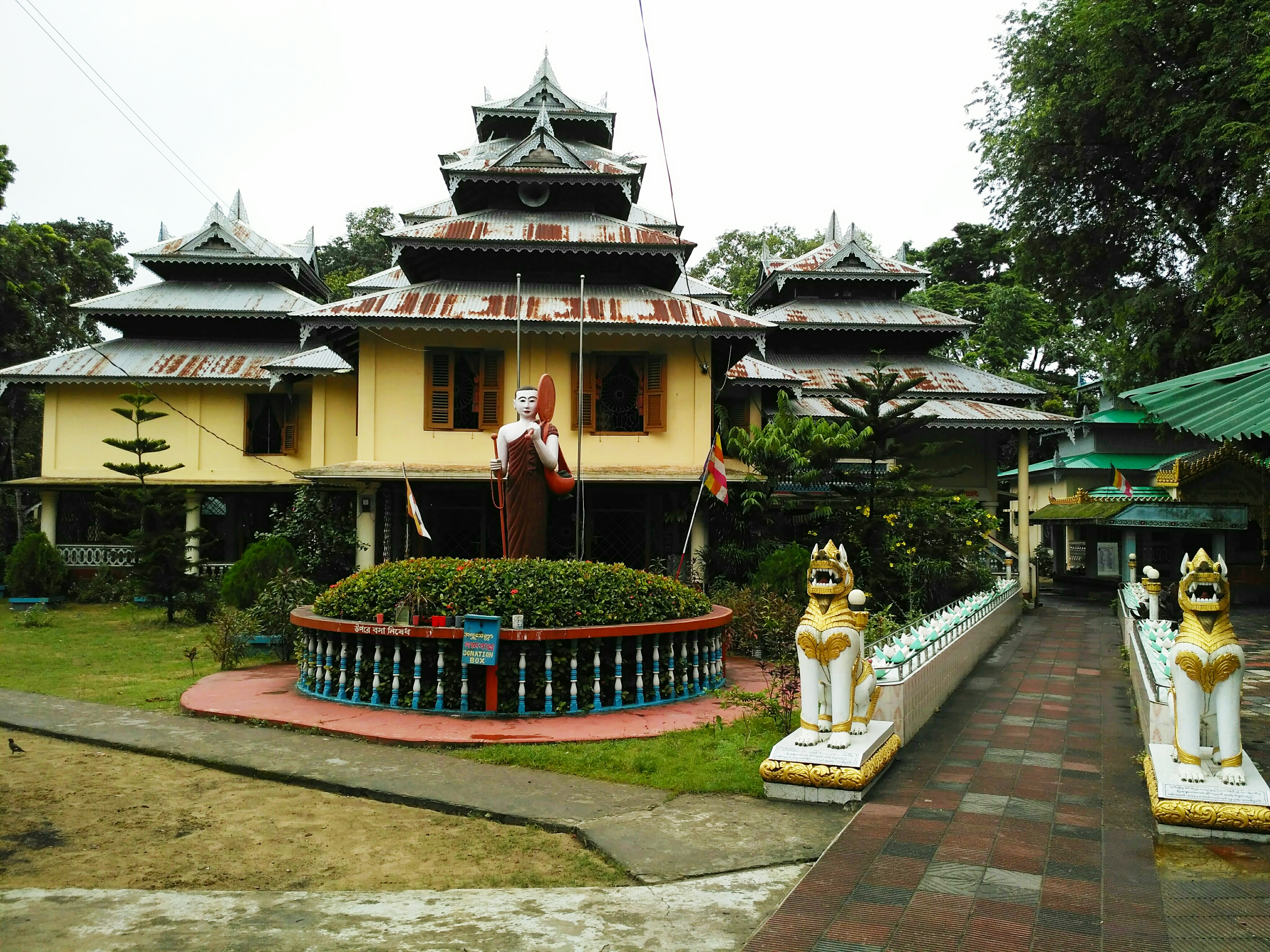
Buddhist monastery in Moheshkhali

The Baruas used to follow Mahayana Buddhism and adhered to some Hindu customs until the mid-19th century, when Saṅgharaj Sāramedha Mahāthera (1801–82) of Arakan, returning from Bodh Gaya, was invited to Chittagong in 1856.

In the mid-19th century, the Baruas came into contact with other Theravada Buddhists from Burma and Ceylon. The Baruas were among the first groups, alongside the Chakmas, to convert to Buddhism during Buddha's time.

The first Pāli school in modern times was established in Pahartali, Chittagong by Ācarya Punnācāra, with financial support from a zamindar, Haragobinda Mutsuddi, in 1885. The Bauddha Dharmankur Sabha Buddhist religious organisation was founded by Venerable Kripasaran Mahasthavir in Calcutta on 5 October 1892. Kripasharan Mahasthavir was its first president, and Surendralal Mutsuddi was its secretary. The journal of the Dharmankur Sabha, Jagajjyoti, edited by Gunalangkar Sthavir and Shraman Punnananda Swami, was first published in 1908.

Benimadhab (1888–1948) was born in the village of Mahamuni under Raozan Thana, Chittagong. He was the son of Kaviraj Rajchandra Talukder. Benimadhab assumed the title of "Barua." In 1913, he obtained an MA degree in Pali from University of Calcutta. He also studied law at Calcutta City College and Calcutta Law College.

He became one of the pioneers of the revitalisation of Buddhism in the Barua Community. He joined the Mahāmuni Anglo-Pāli Institution as headmaster in 1912. From 1913 to 1914, he worked as a lecturer in the Pāli department of the University of Calcutta. He went to England on a government scholarship in 1914, earning an MA in Greek and Modern European Philosophy from the University of London. In 1917, he was awarded a D.Litt. by the University of London, becoming the first Asian to do so. After returning to India in 1918, Benimadhab rejoined Calcutta University and was promoted to professorship. He improvised the syllabus of the MA course in Pali, as well as his work in the departments of Ancient Indian History and Culture (1919–48) and Sanskrit (1927–48) at the same university.

Anagarika Dharmapala visited Chittagong in 1917, where he influenced a 9-year-old boy, who later became the well-known Pali scholar Prof. Dwijendra Lal Barua.

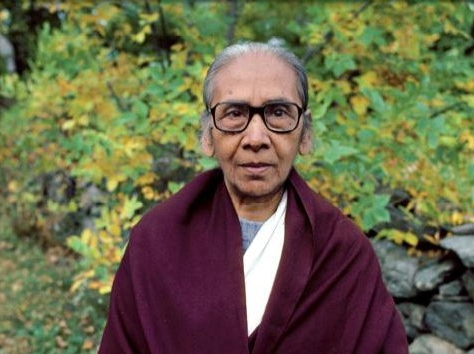
Dipa Ma, a prominent Buddhist master in Asia of Barua descent.

Religious Barua Magh Buddhist Scriptures

== Present status ==
In West Bengal, India, the Baruas are considered as Magh tribe. The Barua people are called Maramagyi or Maramagri in Myanmar. They are considered a subgroup of the Rakhine people under Myanmar's 1982 ethnicity law.

Barua surname is also a common Assamese surname used by Assamese Hindus. Magh Buddhist Baruas are historically, culturally, regionally, socially, linguistically, ethnically and by religion, a different community from the Assamese Hindu Baruas and both the communities share no similarity with each other. Barua is just a shared surname between various communities in the Indian subcontinent.

== Notable Barua ==
- Benimadhab Barua
- Dipa Ma
- Kripasaran
- Sukumar Barua
- Partha Barua
- Bipradash Barua
- Subrata Barua
- Sukomal Barua
- Braja Bihari Barua
- Dibyendu Barua
- Bikiran Prasad Barua
- Dilip Barua
- Dilip Barua (footballer)
- Gyanashree Mahathero
- Satya Priya Mahathero
- Suddhananda Mahathero

== See also ==
- Anagarika Munindra
- Barua Buddhist Institutes in India and Bangladesh
- Bengali Buddhists
- Dalit Buddhist movement § Re-emergence of Buddhism in India
- Dipa Ma
- Shalban Vihara
- Chakma people
