= Mirzakhil High School and College =

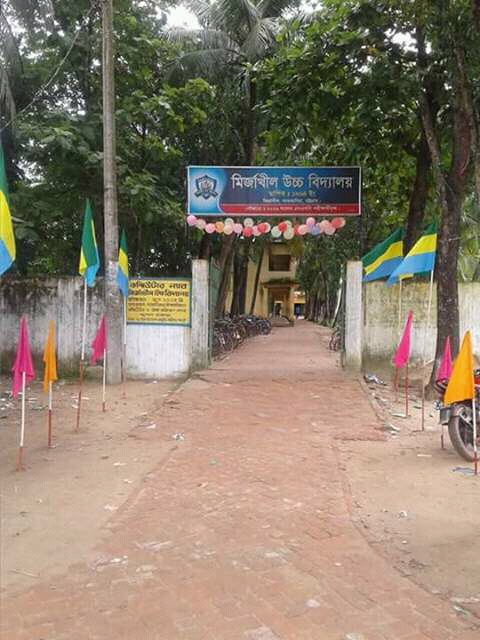

Location
- Mirzakhil village, Sonakania Union, Satkania Upazila, Chittagong; Bangladesh
- 22.0534°N 92.0426°E

Information
- Type: school and college
- Motto: শিক্ষাই আলো (Education is light)
- Established: 1964
- Founder: Abdur Rauof Chowdhury
- School board: Board of Intermediate and Secondary Education, Chittagong
- Session: January–December
- School code: EIIN: 104992
- Headmaster: Akhter Ahmed
- Teaching staff: 17
- Grades: 6th-12th grade
- Gender: Boy's and Girl's
- Enrollment: 1500+
- Education system: National Curriculum and Textbook Board
- Language: Bengali
- Campus: Rural
- Colours: Blue and Green
- school code: 3726
- EIIN number: 104992
- Website: http://mirzakhilhs.edu.bd

Mirzakhil High School and College is an educational institution of Bangladesh.

== Location ==
Mirzakhil High School and College is located in Chittagong district under Satkania Upazila at Sonakania Union at Mirzakhil village.

== History ==
The high school was founded in 1964 by Abdur Rauf. It run as a secondary school in 1982. The institution received permission to teach higher secondary level as per the notification signed by the Deputy Secretary of the Ministry of Education on 10 February 2022.

== Teachers ==
Akhter Ahmed is the present headmaster of the school. The institution has more than 20 teachers.

== Extracurricular activities ==
Extracurricular activities include Scouts and Girl Guides, as well as yearly cultural competitions.

== Achievement ==
Among the 1500+ student's studies in this school, its yearly result is 92%.

== Gallery ==
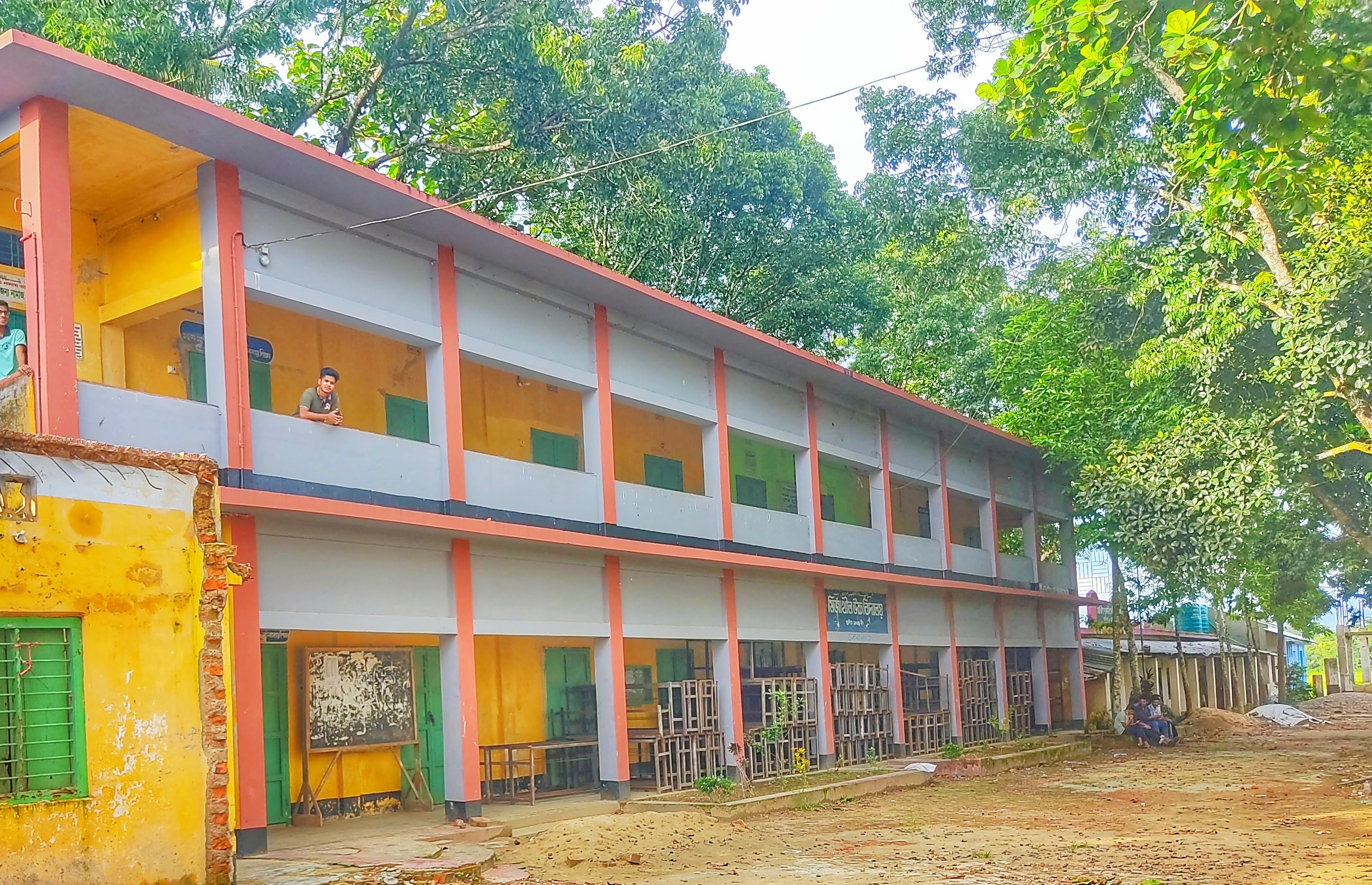

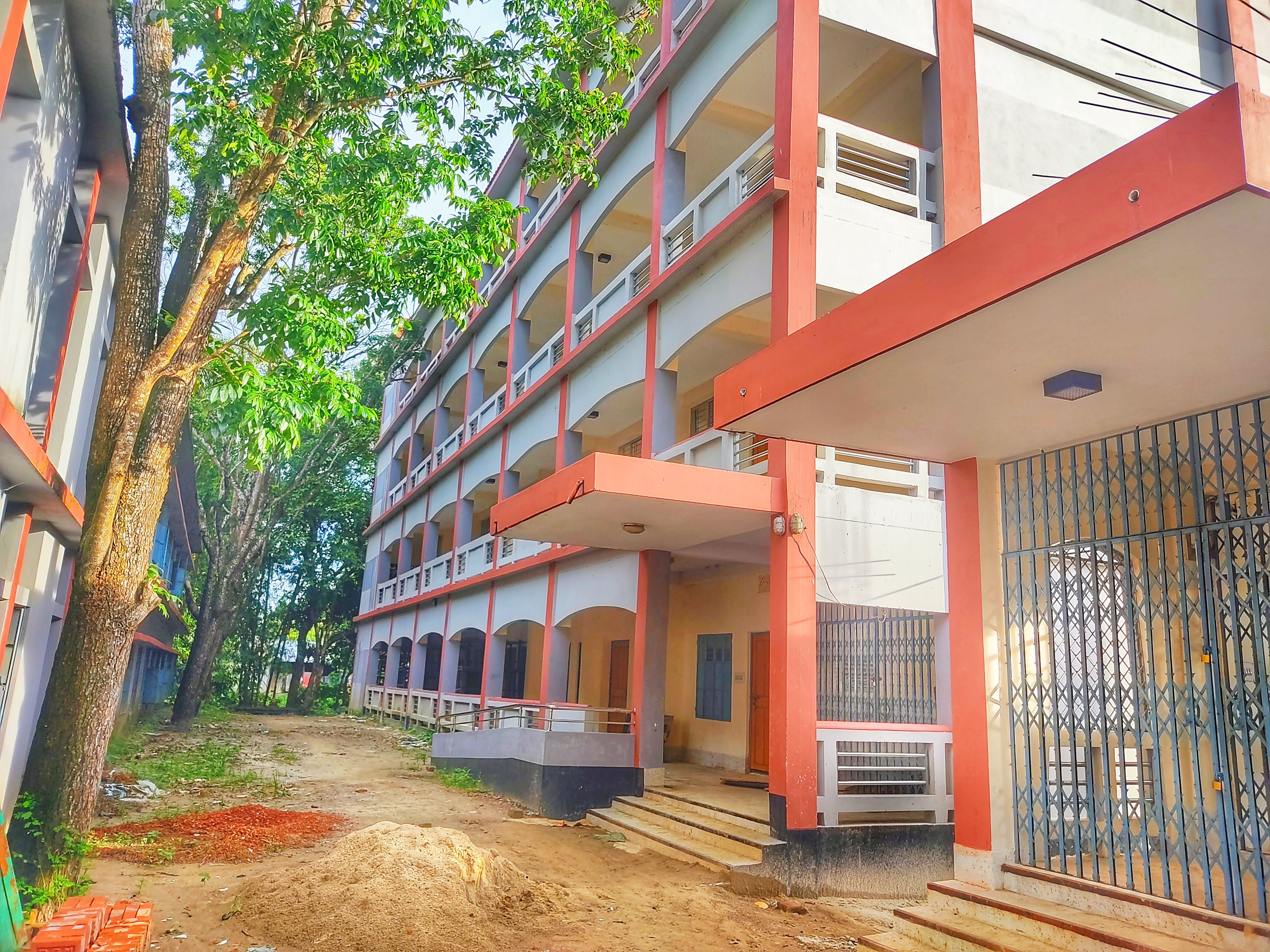

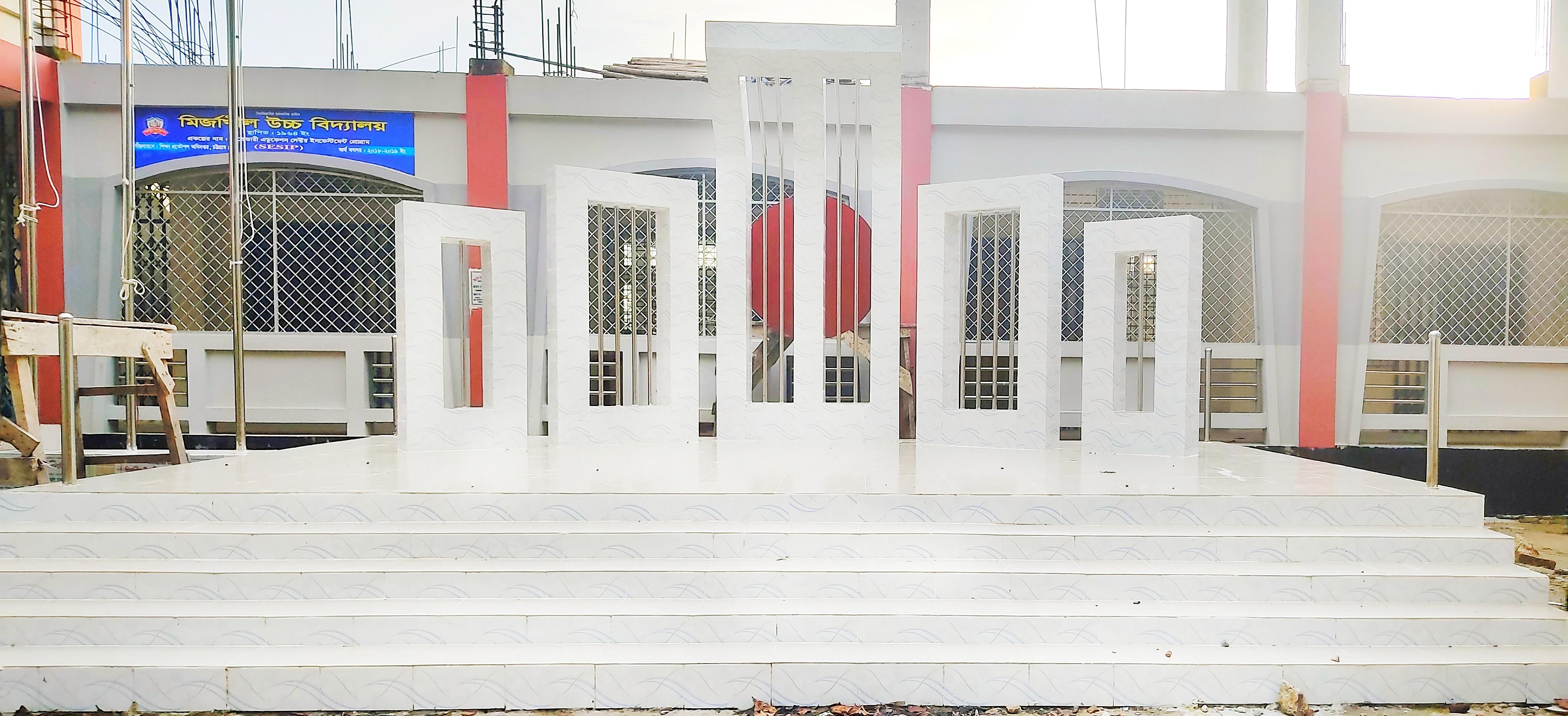

== See also ==
1. Satkania Government College
2. Madarsha Union
3. Sonakania Union
