= Dharmapur Union, Satkania =

Dharmapur Union ধর্মপুর ইউনিয়ন
- Union
- Location within Bangladesh
- Coordinates: 22°8.5′N 92°6′E
- Country: Bangladesh
- Division: Chittagong Division
- District: Chittagong District
- Upazila: Satkania Upazila

Government
  - Chairman: Nasir Uddin Tipu

Area
  - Total: 6.58 km^{2} (2.54 sq mi)

Population (2011)
  - Total: 11,191
  - Density: 1,700/km^{2} (4,400/sq mi)
- Postal code: 4388
- Website: dharmapur.chittagong.gov.bd

Dharmapur is a union of Satkania Upazila in Chittagong District, Bangladesh.

== Area ==
The area of Dharmapur Union is 1,626 acres (6.58 square kilometres).

== Population ==
According to the 2011 statistics, the population of Dharmapur Union is 11,191. Among them, 5,866 are males and 5,325 are females.

== Location and boundaries ==
Dharmapur Union is located in the north-eastern part of Satkania Upazila. The distance of this union from the upazila headquarters is about 6 kilometers. To the west of this union are Kaliaish Union and Keochia Union, to the south are Keochia Union and Bajalia Union, to the east are the Sangu River and Dohazari Municipality, and to the north are the Sangu River and Dohazari Municipality.

== History ==
For administrative convenience, Dharmapur Union was established as a new union in 1973 by separating from Bajalia.

== Administrative structure ==
Dharmapur Union is the No. 12 Union Parishad under Satkania Upazila. The administrative activities of this union are under Satkania Police Station. It is part of the 291st parliamentary constituency Chittagong-14 of the Jatiya Sangsad. It is divided into 2 mouzas. The villages of this union are:

- Alamgir
- Dharmapur

== Education system ==
The literacy rate of Dharmapur Union is 49.72%. There are 2 secondary schools and 8 primary schools in this union.

== Educational institutions ==
Secondary schools

- Oli Ahmad Bir Bikram High School
- Bajalia High School

Primary schools

- Uttar Dharmapur Government Primary School
- Dakshin Dharmapur Government Primary School
- Dharmapur Alamgir Government Primary School
- Dharmapur Kalgazi Sikdar Government Primary School
- Dharmapur Mohuripara Government Primary School
- Dharmapur Government Primary School
- Paschim Dharmapur Government Primary School
- Bajalia Government Primary School

== Communication system ==
The two main roads for communication in Dharmapur Union are the Bajalia–Dohazari Road and the Kaliaish–Dharmapur Road. The primary mode of communication is the CNG-driven auto-rickshaw.

== Places of worship ==
There are 15 mosques, 4 Eidgahs, and 17 temples in Dharmapur Union.

== Canals and rivers ==
The Sangu River flows along the northern and eastern borders of Dharmapur Union. In addition, the Garal canal and Uttya canal flow inside this union.

== Markets ==
The two main haats/markets of Dharmapur Union are Chakraborty Hat and Biswas Hat.

== Points of interest ==
- Dharmapur Fakirpara Darbar Sharif

== Public representatives ==
- Current Chairman: Nasir Uddin Tipu

List of chairmen

Serial No	Name of Chairman	Time of Period
01	Siddiq Ahmad Chowdhury	1965–1972
02	Mafzal Ahmad Chowdhury	1972 (Chairman of Relief Committee)
03	Siddiq Ahmad Chowdhury	1973–1982
04	Khuilya Mia (acting)	1982–1983
05	Siddiq Ahmad Chowdhury	1983–1987
06	Abdul Motaleb Chowdhury (acting)	1987–1990
07	Abdul Latif	1990–1991
08	Yunus Chowdhury	1992–1997
09	Mohammad Kutub Uddin Shah Alam	1998–2011
10	Mohammad Elias Chowdhury	2011–2022
11	Nasir Uddin Tipu	2022–present

== See also ==
- Madarsha Union
- Eochia Union
