= Purangor Union =

Purangor Union পুরানগড় ইউনিয়ন
- Union
- Location in Bangladesh
- Coordinates: 22°9′N 92°8′E
- Country: Bangladesh
- Division: Chittagong Division
- District: Chittagong District

Government
  - Union Chairman: Mahbubul Hoque Sikdar

Area
  - Total: 25.65 km^{2} (9.90 sq mi)

Population (2011)
  - Total: 17,809
  - Density: 694.31/km^{2} (1,798.3/sq mi)
- Time zone: UTC+6 (BST)
- Post code: 4388
- Website: puranagarup.chittagong.gov.bd

Purangor Union (Bengali: পুরাণগড় ইউনিয়ন) is a Union of Satkania Upazila in the Division of Chittagong, Bangladesh.

It has an area of 25.65 square kilometres (9.90 sq mi)

== Geography ==
The union's total area is 25.65 square kilometres (9.90 sq mi). Purangor is bounded by Dohazari in the west, Bandarban in the east, Bajalia in the south and Chandanaish in the north.

== Economy ==
Most villagers are directly and indirectly involved in agriculture. Here main crops are rice, beans, cucumbers, potatoes and other vegetables. They supply these crops local market and outside. Overall, their financial condition is good. There are also teachers, engineers, doctors, businessmen, bankers and government employees in this village. and it beside Bank of the sangu river it life of purangor union.

== Administration ==
- Natun Hat
- Hashim Para
- Purangor
- South Purangor
- middle Moneyabad
- Moneyagor
- Kalinogor
- Lotabnia
- Fokirkhil
- Boitoroni
- Shilghata

== Education ==
There are only 1 high school, 8 government primary school and 4 junior dakhil madrasha in this village. Remarkable educational institutes are:

- Purangor Shah Sharfuddin High School
- Purangor Govt. Primary School
- middleMoneyabad Govt. Primary School
- Fakhirkhil Govt. Primary School
- Baitarani Govt. Primary School
- Shilghata Govt. Primary School
- North Purangor Govt. Primary School(newly Govt.)
- South Purangor Govt. Primary School(newly Govt.)
- Purangor Shah Sharfuddin Junior Dakhil Madrasha
- Rahima salam adorsho ibtedayi madrasha.
- Munira mujaher madrasha.
- Shilgata nure madina madrasha
- Dhalirbari Nurani Madrasha

== See More ==
- Madarsha Union
- Eochia Union
- Sonakania Union
- Satkania Upazila
