= Satkania Government College =

College in Chittagong, Bangladesh

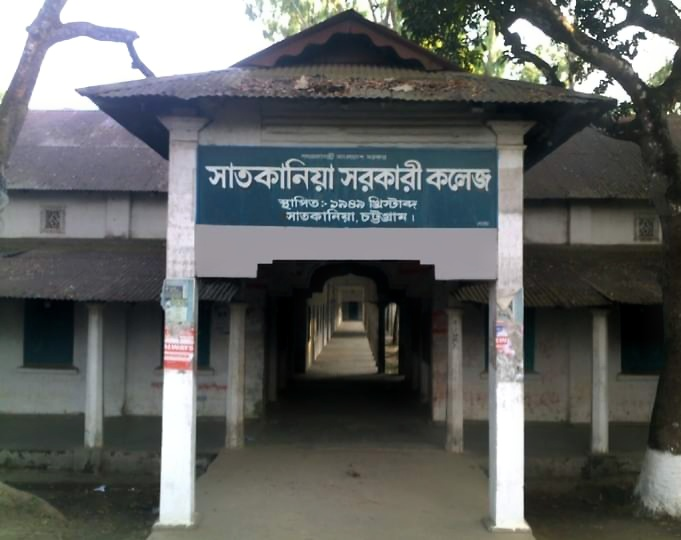
- Type: Public
- Established: 1949
- Founder: Mozaffar Ahmed Chowdhury
- Location: Satkania, Chittagong District, Bangladesh; 22.0768°N 92.0577°E
- Campus: 9.6 acres (3.9 ha); Suburban
- Website: satkaniagovtcollege.edu.bd

Satkania Government College is an educational institution of Bangladesh and the only government college of Satkania Upazila.

== Location ==
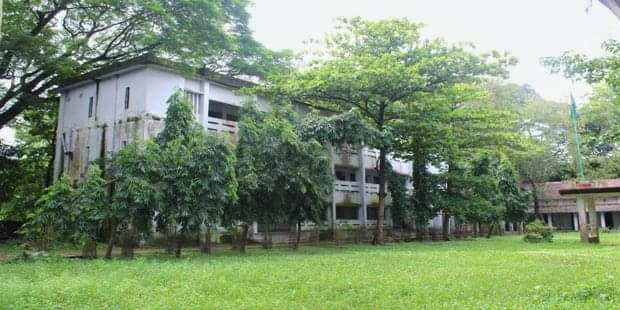
Satkania Government College

Satkania Government College is situated in the Chittagong District at Satkania Upazila.

== History ==
It was established in 1949 by Mozaffar Ahmed Chowdhury. In 1982 it runs as government college.

The college began offering bachelor's degrees in arts and commerce in 1965.

== Academic works ==
At present the institution offer to study higher secondary education class 11–12. Bedside this, it has degree course under National University of Bangladesh. Recently the institution starts undergraduate honours course under National University of Bangladesh.

== Student ==
There are 4000+ students study in the institution.

== Infrastructure ==
The institution area is 9.6 acres (3.9 ha). The institution has an administrative building, it has six academic buildings. For the students, the institution has a playground. The institution has a Library.

== Management ==
The institution has a managing committee, who are conduct the institution.

== Department and faculty ==
The institution currently offer three department for higher secondary students. These are Science, Arts and Commerce. And also the institution has following faculties

1. Physics
2. Chemistry
3. Mathematics
4. Zoology
5. Botany
6. Bengali
7. English
8. Philosophy
9. Economics
10. Information and Communication Technology (ICT)
11. Accounting
12. Management
13. Political Science
14. History
15. Islamic history and culture.

== Notable people ==
- Zakerul Haq Chowdhury, two-term member of the Provincial Assembly of East Pakistan, was on the college's governing body.
- Bimal Guha, poet and Ekushey Padak recipient, completed his Higher Secondary Certificate in 1970.

== See also ==
- Mirzakhil High School
