= Barua Buddhist Institutes in India and Bangladesh =

Barua Buddhists come from the small Barua community of Bengali-speaking Theravada Buddhists native to Tripura in north-east India. Barua Buddhist institutes have been established in India and Bangladesh.

== Barua Buddhist Institutes ==
- Bouddha Dharmankur Sabha or Bengal Buddhist Association, Kolkata, India
- Dharmarajika Bouddha Mahavihar, Kamalapur, Dhaka.
- Sudarshan Vihar, Hoarapara, Raozan, CHT.
- Dharmananda Vihar, Boalkhali, CHT.
- Chandagon Sarbajanin Bouddha Vihar, Chandgaon, CHT city.
- Pancharia Gandha kuti Vihar, Pancharia, Patiya, CHT.
- Nandabangsha Int'l Meditation Center, Bangalhaliya, Rajsthali, Rangamati, CHT.
- Ananda Vihar, Lagnasar, Comilla.
- All India Federation of Bengali Buddhists, Kolkata.
- International Brotherhood Mission, Dibrugarh, India.
- International Meditation Center, Bodh Gaya, India.
- Garia Bauddha Sanskriti Samsad, Kolkata.
- Young Buddhist Student Literacy Mission, Kolkata.
- Vidarsan Siksha Kendra, Kolkata.
- Shyamnagar Buddhist Welfare Society, Shyamnagar.
- Santiniketan Ambedkar Buddhist Welfare Mission, Snajuripally, Goalpara, Bolpur.
- North Dum Dum Bauddha Society.
- Ananda Buddha Vihar, Durganagar, Kolkata-700049, West Bengal, India.
- Jetaban Vihar Parisad, Dattapukur, P.S.Barasat, West Bengal.
- Insight Buddhist Meditation Centre, Barisa, Kolkata.
- Bodhi Sabha, Athpur Nutan Pally (Barua Para), Shyamnagar, Barrackpore.
- Benuban Bauddha Sangha, Rabindra Nagar Dum Dum Cantonment, Kolkata.
- Bodhisattva Vihara, Lucknow.
- Gandhamadhan Vihara, Darjeeling.
- Shillong Buddhist Temple, Shillong.
- Saptaparni Vihara, Rajgir, Bihar.
- Dharmachakra Vihara, Saranath.
- Buddhist education and Cultural Centre of Assam, Jorhat.
- Jorhat Buddha Vihara, Rajabari, Jorhat, Assam.
- Vangabodhi.
- Bongaigaon Buddhist Temple, Bongaigaon, Assam.
- Jaggajyoti Buddha Vihar, New Delhi.
