= Mahbub Kabir Chowdhury =

Bangladeshi politician

Member of Bangladesh Parliament
- In office 1979–1986
- Preceded by: B. M. Faizur Rahman
- Succeeded by: Oli Ahmad

Personal details
- Political party: Bangladesh Nationalist Party

Mahbub Kabir Chowdhury is a Bangladesh Nationalist Party politician and a former member of parliament for Chittagong-13.

== Career ==
Chowdhury was elected to parliament from Chittagong-13 as a Bangladesh Nationalist Party candidate in 1979.
