= Mokkar Boli Khela =

Traditional form of wrestling

Mokkar Boli Khela (মক্কার বলীখেলা)
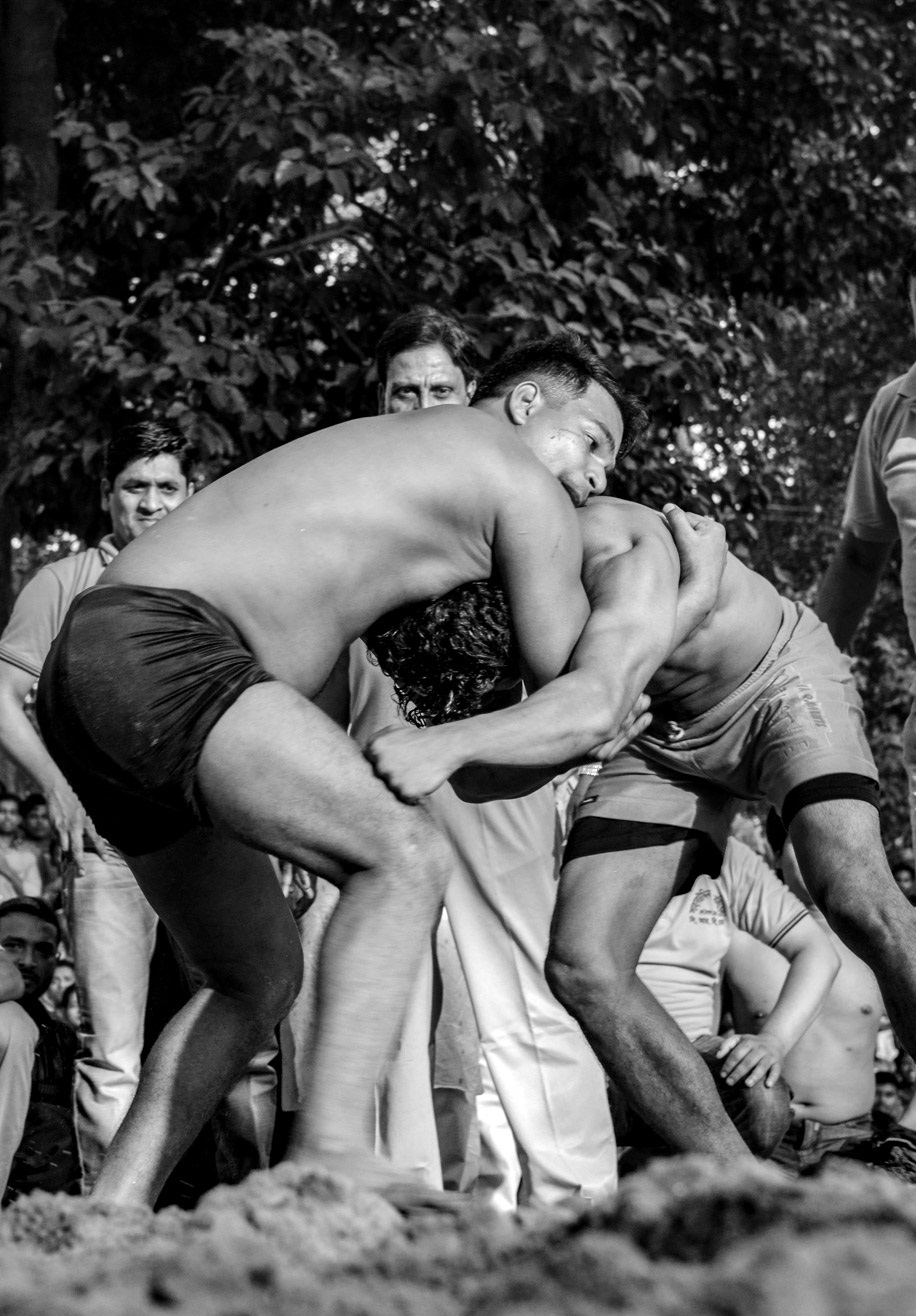
- Two players (boli) playing Boli khela in Chittagong
- Focus: Grappling
- Hardness: Full Contact
- Country of origin: Bangladesh
- Famous practitioners: Didarul Alam
- Parenthood: Historic
- Olympic sport: No

Mokkar Boli Khela is a special type of wrestling game, which is held in Madarsha Union under Chittagong Satkania Upazila every year on 7th Baishakh of Bengali year. The participants in this game are called "Bali". In the regional language of Chittagong, it is known as Bali khela.

== Etymology ==
"Boli" means wrestler or a powerful person in Bengali, while "Khela" denotes a game or play. So, Boli Khela means game of the powerful person.

== History ==
About 250–300 years ago, Yasin Makki, who came from Mecca, Saudi Arabia, to spread Islam, started living in the hilly area of Madarsha in Satkania Upazila, Chittagong. From then on the area became known as Mokkarbari. Yasin started some business in the area as well as preaching. During the Hajj season, he used to take many Bangladeshi Haji to Saudi Arabia for Hajj. At one time he started living permanently in the Madarsha area of Satkania. Apart from Satkania, he bought a large amount of land in different parts of Chittagong. Yasin Makki went to Saudi Arabia with some Haji from Bangladesh during the Hajj season and died there. Then his next generation introduced the zamindari system. Later, Yasin Makki's grandson, Kader Bokshu, first introduced the game in 1889 to give pleasure to his subjects while collecting rent, and after his death it became known as the Mokkar Bali Khela. At the beginning of the game, he used to put a giant tree in front of the house. Those who came to pay the rent and those who could lift the tree from among the locals were considered only suitable for playing game. The main competition was played among those who were qualified to pick up pieces of trees, and prizes were given to the winners. Boishakhi fairs are also organized in the vicinity of a few kilometers around the game.

== Rules ==
The arena measures 20 feet in diameter, and can be a circle or square in shape. It is played on a dirt or sand floor.

The event starts at afternoon in a festive mood with the music of 'Dabor' (one kind of folk drum) and 'Sanai' (folk flute). Each match lasts about 25–30 minutes, but if both competitors agree, the length of the final match may be extended up to 10–15 minutes.

== See also ==
- Boli Khela
