= Abu Taher (academic) =

Bangladeshi academic

Md. Abu Taher
- মো. আবু তাহের
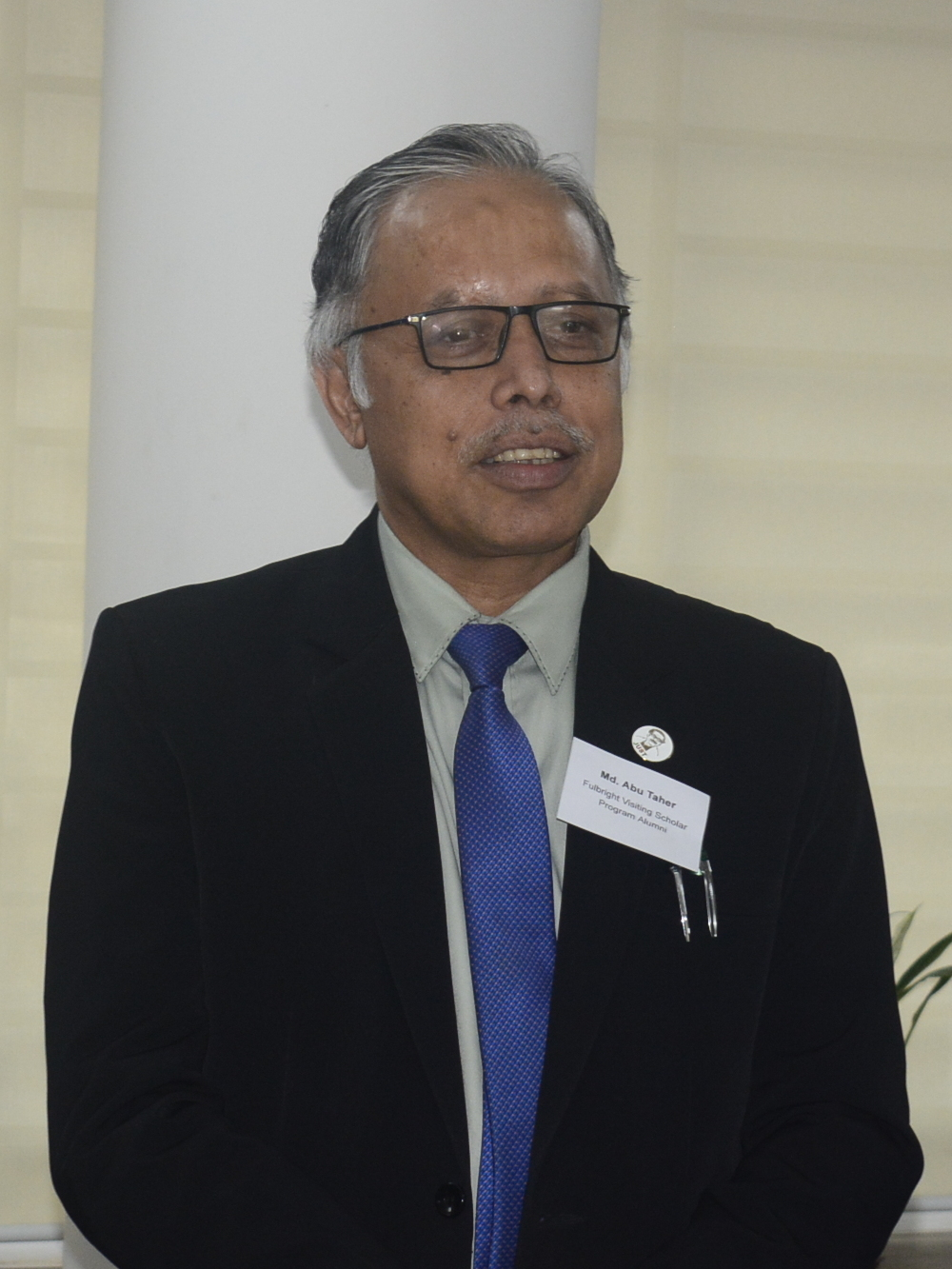

19th Vice-chancellor of the University of Chittagong
- In office 20 March 2024 – 12 August 2024
- Chancellor: President of Bangladesh
- Preceded by: Shireen Akhter

Personal details
- Born: Satkania, Chittagong District, Bangladesh
- Education: University of Chittagong; Inha University; Texas A&M University

Md. Abu Taher is a Bangladeshi academic who served as the 19th vice-chancellor of the University of Chittagong in 2024. He is also a full-time member of the University Grants Commission (Bangladesh). Previously, he served as pro-vice chancellor of Southeast University and treasurer of Bangladesh Open University and currently teaches at Brac University

== Early life and education ==
Md. Abu Taher was born at Madarsha Union of Satkania Upazila in Chittagong.

Taher completed his primary education at Babunagar Government Primary School of Madarsha Union, his secondary education at Amilaish Kanchana Banga Chandra Ghosh Institute, and his higher secondary education at Chittagong College. He later completed his higher education at the University of Chittagong, Inha University in South Korea, and Texas A&M University in the United States.

== Career ==
Taher started his career by joining Government Commerce College after passing the BCS examination. In 1995, he joined Chittagong University as a teacher in the Department of Management, and in 2004, he became a professor in the department. Earlier, he served as the pro-vice chancellor of Southeast University and treasurer of Bangladesh Open University. In addition to teaching, he worked in important positions in various local and foreign organisations and projects, including the World Bank, the ILO, and the British Council.

On 12 August 2024, Taher was compelled to resign from his post in the face of student agitation. The protesters set an ultimatum of 24 hours for the resignations of Taher, hall provosts, and proctorial body officials. Later, they extended the deadline to 12pm on Friday. As they did not resign, the protesters locked the VC's residence and the proctor's office. Finally, he submitted his resignation letter on Sunday morning.

== Publication ==
More than 70 articles written by Taher have been published. His 10 books on business administration are being read as undergraduate- and postgraduate-level texts. He has presented 28 papers at various international conferences.
