= Abu Saleh (politician) =

Bangladeshi politician (1940–2022)

Abu Saleh MP
- আবু ছালেহ
- Born: 1940; Satkania, Chittagong, Bengal Presidency, British India
- Died: 3 August 2022 (aged 82); Chittagong, Bangladesh
- Political party: Bangladesh Awami League
- Spouse: Fatema Saleh

Abu Saleh (Bengali: আবু ছালেহ; 1940 – 3 August 2022) was a Bangladeshi politician, independence activist, and a member of the Constituent Assembly of Bangladesh. He was one of the organisers of the Bangladeshi Liberation War. Saleh was also a close companion of the first president of Bangladesh, Sheikh Mujibur Rahman.

== Life and career ==
Saleh was born in Satkania Upazila, Chittagong District in 1940. During the 1960s, he was a student leader in Chittagong and an organiser of the Bangladesh Liberation War. He participated in the National Assembly elections for the Awami League, held on 6 December 1970, and was elected MNA of Satkania-Kutubdia-Chakaria (N-E-160) upazila. Saleh served as the co-captain of Chittagong South and East during the Liberation War. Furthermore, he served as president of the Chhatra League in the Chittagong District and as general secretary of the Awami League in Chittagong South District.

Saleh died on 3 August 2022, at the age of 82, at a private hospital in Chittagong City.
