= Afzal Ali (poet) =

Medieval Bengali poet

- আফজল আলী
- Born: 16th century Satkania Upazila, Chittagong District
- Occupation: Poet
- Writing career
- Language: Bengali
- Notable works: Nasihatnama, Padabali

Afzal Ali (Bengali: আফজল আলী, romanized: Afzol Ali) was a medieval Bengali poet. He is best known for his magnum opus, Nasihatnama. Abdul Karim Sahitya Bisharad claims that he belongs to the 16th-century, although Banglapedia places him in the 17th century.

== Early life and family ==
Afzal Ali was born into a Bengali Muslim family from the village of Milua in present-day Satkania, Chittagong District. His father was known as Bhangu Faqir.

== Career ==
Afzal Ali was known to have written Nasihatnama (নসীহতনামা) around 1662 C.E., as well as Padabali, which were a few verses written in Vaishnava style. The former is a notable Muslim literary work of Bengal as only few Islamic have been found in Bengali during that period. The book contains references to sermons in simple language, and Ali had a good reputation as a writer. Many Bengali authors wrote books titled "Nasihatnama", with the next-known poet being Sheikh Paran (1550-1615).
