= B. M. Faizur Rahman =

Bangladeshi politician (1930–2012)

Dr. B. M. Faizur Rahman

Member of Bangladesh Parliament and Constituent Assembly
- In office 1973–1979
- Succeeded by: Mahbub Kabir Chowdhury

Personal details
- Born: 1930 Satkania, Chittagong
- Died: 30 October 2012 (aged 81–82)
- Party: Bangladesh Awami League
- Children: Mohammad Sadrul Pasha, Asif Iqbal, Tazia Irfan, Jessica Irfan and Moontaha Irfan

B. M. Faizur Rahman (1930 — 30 October 2012) was a Bangladesh Awami League politician and a member of parliament for Chittagong-13.

== Early life ==
He was born in 1930 in Chittagong district under Satkania Upazila at Kanchana Union. He was the son of an influential Muslim League family. He passed LMF degree from the then Chittagong Medical School. The Chittagong General Hospital was then called Chittagong Medical School.

== Political life ==
On the advice of MA Aziz, a close associate of Bangabandhu, Fayez, a son of a Muslim League family, was nominated as an MPA from the Awami League in the 1970 provincial election from the present Chandnaish constituency of Satkania (partial) and Patia (partial) from Chittagong-13. On 17 December 1970, he elected as MPA at Provincial Assembly election from Chittagong-13 (P.E-293).

He was elected to parliament from Chittagong-13 as a Bangladesh Awami League candidate in 1973. He served as the vice-president of the South Chittagong District unit of Bangladesh Awami League. Rahman also was the chairman of Kanchana Union from 1968 to 1969. He died on 30 October 2012 in Dhaka, Bangladesh, aged 82.
