= Kripasaran =

Venerable Kripasaran

Personal life
- Born: 22 June 1865 Unainepura, Chittagong, Bengal Presidency, British India
- Died: 30 April 1926 (aged 60)

Religious life
- Religion: Buddhism

Kripasaran was a 19th and 20th-century Buddhist monk and yogi, best known for reviving Buddhism in British India. Kripasaran led a renaissance of Buddhist thought and culture in nineteenth century India.

== Early life ==
He was born in the village of Unainpura, Chittagong (in modern-day Bangladesh), on 22 June 1865. His parents were members of the Barua Magh community, a group of mixed Bengali-speaking Arakanese who had migrated north to southern Chittagong after the Burmese conquest of Arakan in 1785.

== Contribution ==
Kripasaran was ordained at the age of 16 and then became fully ordained as a bhikkhu at the age of 20 under Candramohan, the respected elder of the Sangharaja Nikaya. He founded Buddha Dharmankur Sabha (Bengal Buddhist Association) in Calcutta in October 1892. He authored Sakpura Bauddha Batak Samity in 1908 and Satbaria Mahila Sammelani in 1917. At his insistence, higher studies in Pali were introduced in the Calcutta University by Sir Ashutosh. He opened Gunalankar Library in 1909.

In 1907, he established branches at Simla and Lucknow. In 1908, he opened Dibrugarh and Shillong. He started a facility in Ranchi in 1915 and in 1922. He renovated Buddhist templates such as the Vihara of Noapara in 1913, Unainepura in 1921 and Rangamati in 1921. He organised a World Buddhist Conference from 6 Dec 1924 at Nalanda Park, Calcutta.

He died on 30 April 1926. His 150th birth anniversary was celebrated by Bangladesh Bauddha Kristi Prachar Sangha.

== See also ==
- Buddhism in Bangladesh
- History of Buddhism in India
