= Bimal Guha =

Bangladeshi poet (born 1952)

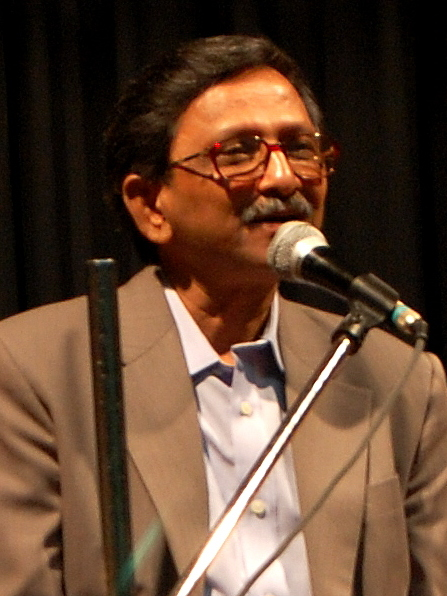
- Guha in Delhi (2011)
- Native name: বিমল গুহ
- Born: 27 October 1952 (age 73) Chittagong, East Bengal, Dominion of Pakistan

Bimal Guha (born 27 October 1952) is a Bangladeshi poet. He appeared on the Bangladesh literary scene in the 1970s. His themes revolve around the war of liberation and the eternal subjects of love, nature, motherland, mother-tongue, tradition, and modernity.

== Biography ==
Guha was born to Prasanna Kumar Guha and Manadabala Guha in Bajalia Union under Satkania Upazila of Chittagong District. He was the eldest among his siblings – Nirmal, Niyati and Amal. Bimal had his early education at local Bajalia High School and passed SSC in 1968. He had his higher secondary education at Satkania College and passed HSC in 1970. Late he received his MA in Bengali literature from the University of Chittagong in 1975. He had his higher education in publishing at Napier University. He received training in editing and publication from Philippines and Thailand. He earned his PhD in modern Bengali poetry from the University of Dhaka in 1997.

== Literary career ==
Guha entered the literary arena in 1968 while he was in school. He read the Sanchaita (collected poems) by Rabindranath Tagore during his leisure time after his secondary examination. He was inspired and began writing. His first poem, Akash (The Sky) was published in Rashmi, the Satkania college magazine, in 1969. Shortly after, his poems began to appear in different literary periodicals and literary sections of the daily newspapers.

Guha's first book of poems Ahongkar, Tomar Shabdo ("Pride, Your Words") was published in 1982. His style changed and he sought new perspectives from one volume to another. The imagery, simile, metaphors and symbolism that Guha applies in his poems imply the probabilities of his speciality in creating an individualistic style in the poetic world of Bangladesh.

Guha has 32 books to his credit; his works include poetry, research, travelogue, edited books and more than 100 articles on literature and culture. Uncompromising in life-struggles, Bimal never bends down to the ungraceful. He has revolting fire in himself; he struggles with quick-sand all through his life. During the 1970s, especially after the liberation war of Bangladesh, some young poets transformed Bangladesh poetry into a newer consciousness and human rejuvenation, and developed the expression of art to arrest time and space into a newer vision; Bimal Guha is remarkable among them. He is associated with many literary and cultural organisations including the Bangladesh Writers Club, Editing and Publication Association of Bangladesh, Asiatic Society of Bangladesh and Bangla Academy.

== Critical acclaim ==
Poet-Critic Shudhasattwa Bose of West Bengal, India remarked on Bimal Guha's poem- "Since the seventies, poems developed a newer feelings and understanding, poetic diction has changed, delivery of words and phrases has totally changed overnight. It has started a new journey without touching the old totally. We can take references from Bimal's poems".

Professor Syed Manzoorul Islam has described in an introductory note- "Bimal Guha's poems are about the problems of our time, more particularly about the difficulties of adjustment that a feeling and thinking individual faces in an increasingly alienating world. As values are forgotten or become obsolete, and relationships become problematic, individuals have to struggle to cling to their dreams. Guha writes movingly about love which can offer a way out but which is constantly thwarted by a mechanical universe. Guha also writes about the need for social change. What makes his poems remarkable is his crisp style which both invokes the rich tradition of the 1930s and charts its distance from it. His diction is personal, contemporary and colloquial. His poems are indeed records of a creative pursuit that excels when it find challenges".

British poet Benjamin Zephaniah has remarked in an interview- "Bimal's poetry is so conversational, and he is also very passionate about the poetry of Bangladesh".

== Personal ==
Guha married Meena Guha in 1980. They have three daughters: Ishika, Upoma and Mithila. He began working at the University of Dhaka in 1979, and he served as Head of office of the Bureau of Publications, the office of the Inspector of Colleges for long. Now he has been teaching at the Department of Printing and Publication Studies of the same university.

== Literary works ==
=== Poetry ===
- Ahongkar, Tomar Shabdo (1982)
- Sanko Par Hole Kholapath (1985)
- Swapne Jwale Shartohin Bhor (1986)
- Bhalobasar Kobita (1989)
- Poetry (Tr. Syed Manzoorul Islam) (1989)
- Nasto Manush O Onnanno Kobita (1995)
- Pratibadi Shabder Michhil (2000)
- Nirbachito Kobita (2001)
- Selected Poems of Bimal Guha (Tr. Siddique Mahmudur Rahman) (2010)
- Thirteen Poems of Bimal Guha (Tr. Kabir Chowdhury) (2011)
- Amra Rayechhi Mati Chhunye (2011)
- Prottekei Prithok Biplobi (2015)
- Biborer Gaan (2015)
- Kobita Sangraha (2016)
- O Prem O Jaltarango (2019)
- Dwitio Britte (2020)
- Bangabandhu O Onnano Kobita (2021)
- E-Kon Mataal Nritto (2022)
- Shreshto Kobita (BehulaBangla Selection) (2023)
- Amader Dirghoshwasguli Jege Achhe (2023)

=== Juvenile poetry ===
- Megh Gurgur Bishti Namey (2000)
- Aguner Dim (2001)
- Chadai Chhana (2002)
- Shada Megher Bhela (2008)
- Tupur O Charka Budi (2013)
- Kishor Kobita Sangraha (2014)
- Tupar Sarabela (2016)
- Sheikh Mujiber Bajrokantho Dak (2020)

=== Research ===
- Ohidul Alam : Life and Literature (1999)
- Adhunik Bangla Kobitay Lokojo Upadan (2001)

=== Travelogue ===
- Onno Deshe Onno Bhubane (2008)
- Statue of Liberty (2018)

=== Autobiography ===
- Dhalproharer Alo (2022)

=== Other publications ===
- Dhaka Bishwabidyalaya Printing and Publication Studies Bibhag Protisthar Itihas (2019)
- Sheikh Mujiber Tarjani (2021)
- Ekattorer Duhshaho Din (2022)
- Godder Adale Jato Kotha (2022)

== Awards and honours ==
- Best Young Poet Award at National Level by Ministry of Information, Government of Bangladesh (1979)
- Kingbadontir Amra National Literary Award for poetry (1385 Bangla Era)
- Bangabandhu Memorial Award (2000)
- Palal Prokashani 50th Birth Anniversary Celebration (2002)
- Poet-Celebrity of Bangladesh Writers' Club (2002)
- Shilpa O Sahitya (literary journal) ed. Ferdous Salam, Vol.2, no.1, Oct. 2002, Special issue on Bimal Guha
- Bimal Guha: Kobi-O-Kobita, a book ed. Farook Mahmud & Khan Mahbub, Palal Prokashani, Dhaka, Oct. 2003
- Faridpur Nirnoy Shilpigoshthi Gold Medal (2008)
- Poet Jibanananda Das Award (2009)
- Sahityo Academy, New York City Honour (2012)
- Palal Prokashani 60th Birth Anniversary celebration (2012)
- Sufi Motahar Hossen Literary Award-2009 (2013)
- Abasor Literary Award 1422 (Bengali Year) (2015)
- Arani Sahitya Puraskar (2016)
- The 65th Birth Anniversary celebration (2017)
- Bangladesh Writers Club Literary Award for poetry (2020)
- Bangla Academy Literary Award for poetry (2021)
- The 70th Birth Anniversary celebration (2022)
- Padakshep Bangladesh Literary Award for poetry (2022)
