= Rakhine Razawin =

Chronicle covering the history of Arakan

- Author: Do We
- Original title: ရခိုင် ရာဇဝင်
- Language: Burmese
- Series: Burmese chronicles
- Genre: Chronicle, History
- Publication place: Arakan
- Pages: 576 palm-leaves

Rakhine Razawin (Burmese: ရခိုင် ရာဇဝင်), is an Arakanese (Rakhine) chronicle covering the history of Arakan. The surviving portions of the chronicle consist of 48 palm-leaf manuscript bundles (576 palm-leaves).

== Bibliography ==
- Harvey, G. E. (1925). History of Burma: From the Earliest Times to 10 March 1824. London: Frank Cass & Co. Ltd.
