= Ohidul Alam =

Ohidul Alam was a Bangladeshi writer, poet, historian, and journalist.

== Early life ==
Alam was born on 1 January 1911 into a conservative Muslim family in Fateyabad, Hathazari Upazila, Chittagong District, East Bengal, British India. He showed an interest in culture at a young age, forming a culture circle with his siblings, Mahbubul Alam and Didarul Alam. He was able to interact with Abdul Quadir, Habibullah Chowdhury, and Kazi Nazrul Islam, when they visited his house. He graduated in 1936 after finishing his B.A. and completed his BEd in Chittagong.

== Career ==
Alam wrote in a number of journals and newspapers. He wrote in the Purabi, which was a journal of folk arts and literature. He published Karnafulir Majhi in 1946. He also worked at the Satyabarta weekly and The Daily Naya Jamana, both of which were based in Chittagong. He was the editor of the East Pakistan-based Daily Purba Pakistan which was owned by the poet Abdus Salam, who was also his relative. In 1974 he started editing the Deshkal periodical. Prthibir Pathik, his biography, was published in 1972. In 1979 he published Kavyasamagra, a collection of his poems. His works were similar to those of poet Jasimuddin. In 1987 the Bangla Jibanikos was published. He wrote a number of children's book. He published on Islamic subjects notably Quraner Jibandarshan.

== Death ==
Alam died on 24 January 1998.
