= Alamgir Muhammad Serajuddin =

Bangladeshi academic

- আলমগীর মোহাম্মদ সিরাজুদ্দীন
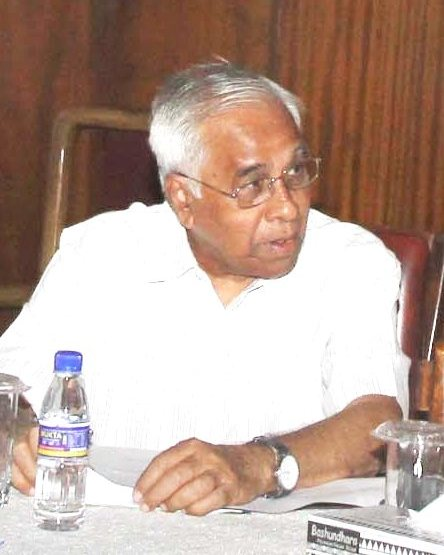
- Serajuddin in 2016

Vice-Chancellor of University of Chittagong
- In office 23 May 1988 – 29 December 1991
- Preceded by: Mohammad Ali
- Succeeded by: Rafiqul Islam Chowdhury

Personal details
- Born: 1 December 1937 (age 88)
- Education: University of Dhaka (MA), University of London (PhD)
- Occupation: university academic, professor
- Awards: Ekushey Padak

Alamgir Muhammad Serajuddin is a Bangladeshi academic. He served as the 8th Vice-Chancellor of the University of Chittagong. In 2017, he was awarded Ekushey Padak by the Government of Bangladesh in the education category.

== Early life and education ==
Serajuddin was born on 1 December 1937 to a Bengali Muslim family in Kanchana, Satkania, Chittagong District. In 1959, he graduated from Dhaka University with a first class honours Master of Arts in History. He gained his Doctor of Philosophy degree from the University of London in 1964. In 1967, Serajuddin became a qualified barrister-at-Law from the Lincoln's Inn of London.

== Career ==
Serajuddin returned to Chittagong in the seventies, where he served as a faculty member of the Department of History at the University of Chittagong. He finished his post-doctoral degree at the University of London in 1974. In 2012, he was made Professor Emeritus of the same university.
