= Braja Bihari Barua =

Bangladeshi war veteran and social worker

- ব্রজ বিহারী বড়ুয়া
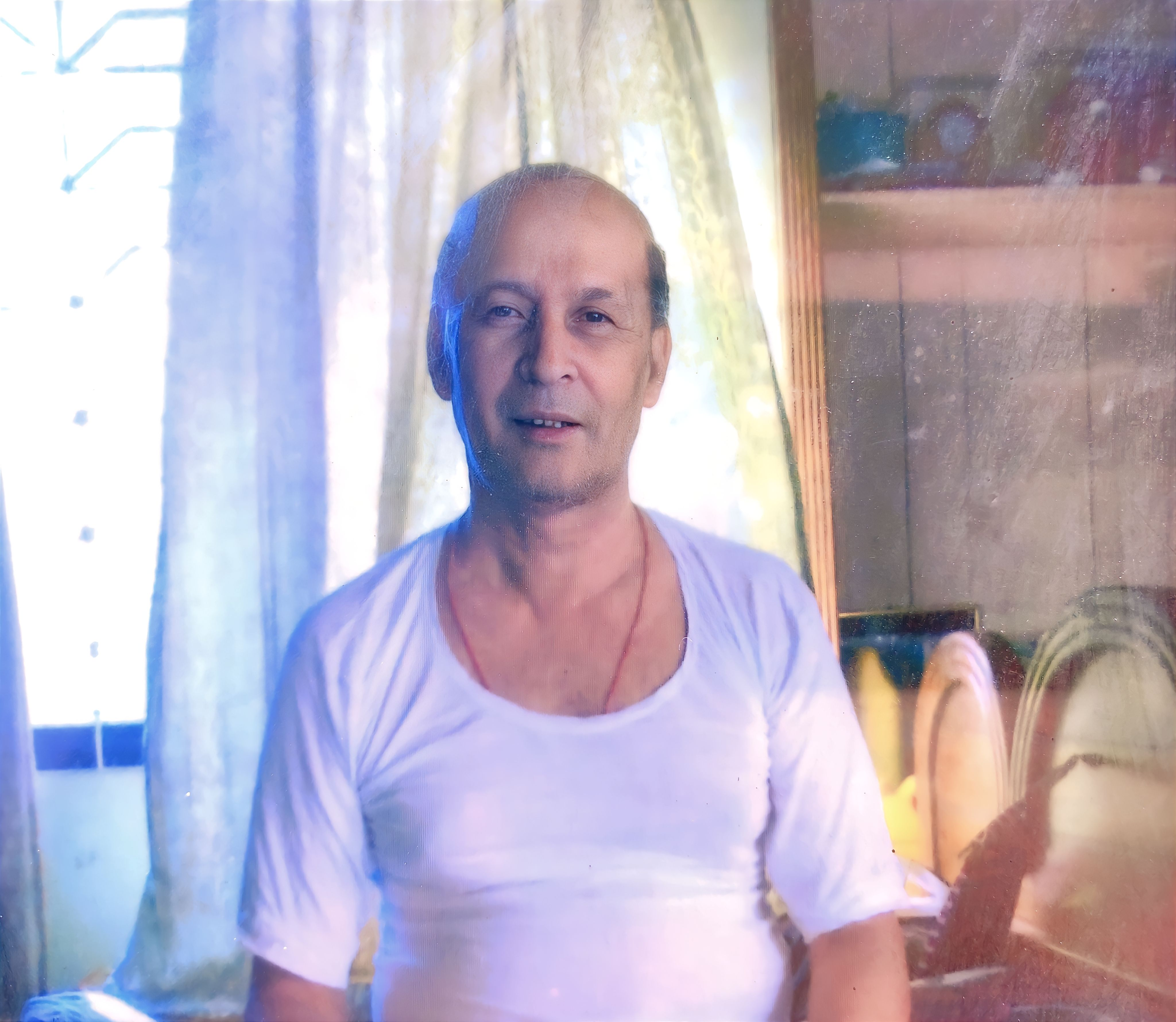
- Braja Bihari Barua in 2012
- Born: Brajendra Bihari Barua; 3 March 1935; Satkania, Chittagong, Bengal Presidency
- Died: 12 April 2014 (aged 79); Chittagong Medical College Hospital, Chittagong
- Spouse: Lily Barua (m. 1970–2014)
- Children: 5
- Military career
- Allegiance: Bangladesh
- Branch: Mukti Bahini
- Service years: 1971
- Unit: Sector 1
- Known for: Participation in the Bangladesh Liberation War
- Conflicts: Bangladesh Liberation War
- Other work: Politician; Social worker; Spiritual practitioner; Traditional healer

Braja Bihari Barua (3 March 1935 – 12 April 2014) was a Bangladeshi war veteran, politician, and social worker. He took part in the Bangladesh Liberation War in 1971 under Sector 1 as a member of the Mukti Bahini.

He later became known for his social work in the Bandarban region and was locally recognized for his community service and spiritual activities.

== Early life and family ==
Barua was born on 3 March 1935 in Dhemsha village under Satkania in the Chittagong District of then British India. He was the fourth of five children of Upendra Lal Bihari Barua and Sita Rani Barua. On his maternal side, he was of English descent. He grew up in a Bengali Buddhist family. His father worked as a police officer during the British Raj.

In 1970, he married Lily Barua. They had two sons and three daughters.

== Career ==
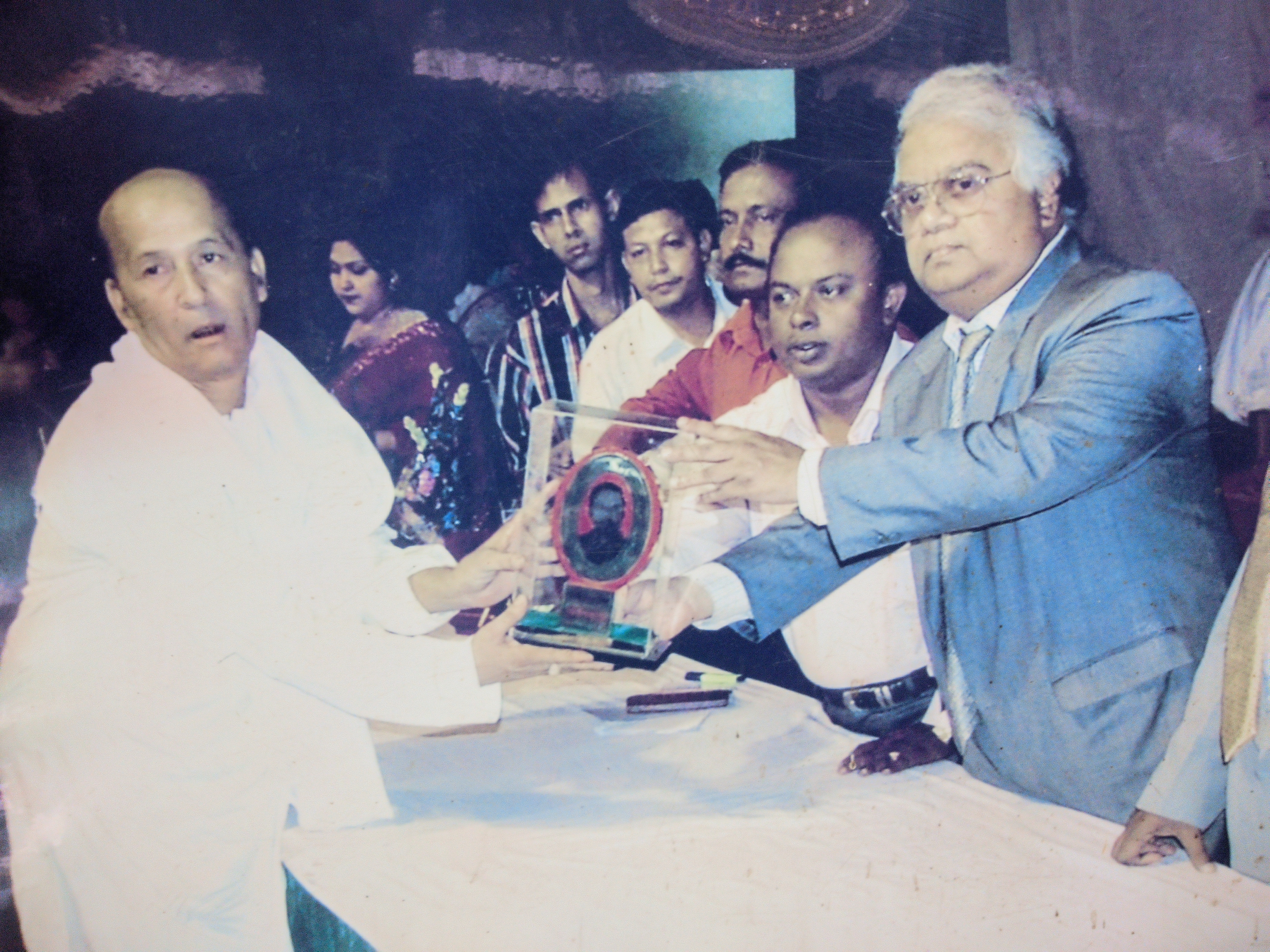
Barua receiving the JISAS Award from Barrister Nazmul Huda at Shahbagh in 2005

Barua was active in politics, the Bangladesh Liberation War, social work, spiritual practice, and traditional medicine. From a young age, he was involved in social and political activities. He worked against inequality, poverty, and social injustice, and was engaged in protecting the rights of people at the local level. He mainly focused on public welfare and was known as a people-oriented leader.

During the Bangladesh Liberation War in 1971, he took part as a freedom fighter and organizer under Sector 1. He was involved in organizing freedom fighters, arranging training, setting up safe shelters, and providing logistical and medical support. He also helped in gathering and sharing information about enemy movements. He was associated with various risky operations during the war and remained active under difficult conditions.

After independence, he settled in Bandarban District and became involved in social work. He contributed to education and healthcare in the Chittagong Hill Tracts and provided traditional herbal treatment to many poor and underprivileged people.

Alongside his social work, he was engaged in spiritual practice. He promoted values such as humanity, morality, self-discipline, and non-violence.

He remained active in social and spiritual activities until the later years of his life.

== War career ==
After the declaration of independence on 25 March 1971, he went to India for training. After completing his training, he returned and joined Sector 1 of the Mukti Bahini. He took part in the war in the Chittagong region and remained active with other freedom fighters, supporting local resistance efforts and participating in operations against Pakistani forces.

As the war progressed, resistance activities increased across the region, and by December 1971 the situation turned in favor of the freedom fighters. Areas including Satkania and Lohagara were liberated on 14 December 1971, shortly before the final victory.

== Death ==
Barua died on 12 April 2014 at the age of 79 at Chittagong Medical College Hospital. At the time, he was engaged in spiritual study. He fell ill suddenly at night and was taken to the hospital, where he died of a heart attack despite treatment.

His death was widely mourned in Bandarban and the Chittagong Hill Tracts. Freedom fighter organizations, social groups, and cultural organizations expressed their condolences. A large number of people attended his funeral prayers, including freedom fighters, political figures, and local residents. He was buried in his family graveyard in the Suwalak area of Bandarban District.
