= Bengal Buddhist Association =

Indian Buddhist organisation

Bengal Buddhist Association (Bengali: বৌদ্ধ ধর্মাঙ্কুর সভা, Bôuddhô Dhôrmāṅkurô Sôbhā) is a Buddhist organisation based in Kolkata.

== History ==
This institution was established by Kṛpāśaraṇa Mahāsthabira on 5 October 1892. It was influenced by modernist South Asian Buddhist currents such as Sri Lankan Buddhist modernism as well as Western Oriental scholarship and spiritual movements like Theosophy. The aim of the organisation was to revive, practice and propagate the principles of Buddhism in India and nurture Buddhist studies. In 1903, Dharmankur Buddhist Temple was set up in Bow Barracks in Kolkata by the association. In 1908 their journal Jagajjyoti was first published.
