= Sonakania Union =

Sonakania Union সোনাকানিয়া ইউনিয়ন
- Union
- Location in Bangladesh
- Coordinates: 22°06′12″N 92°04′50″E
- Country: Bangladesh
- Division: Chittagong Division
- District: Chittagong District

Area
  - Total: 26.53 km^{2} (10.24 sq mi)

Population (2011)
  - Total: 28,072
  - Density: 1,056/km^{2} (2,740/sq mi)
- Time zone: UTC+6 (BST)
- Post code: 4386(Satkania Post Office)
- Website: Official Map of Satkania

Sonakania (Bengali: সোনাকানিয়া) is a Union of Satkania Upazila in the Division of Chittagong, Bangladesh.

It has an area of 26.53 km^{2} and is bounded by Satkania Municipality on the north, Lohagara Upazila on the south, Satkania Union on the east, Madarsha Union on the west.

According to the 2011 Bangladesh Census, Sonakania Union has a population of 23,790.
