= Satkania Upazila =

Upazila in Chattogram Division, Bangladesh

Satkania সাতকানিয়া
- Upazila
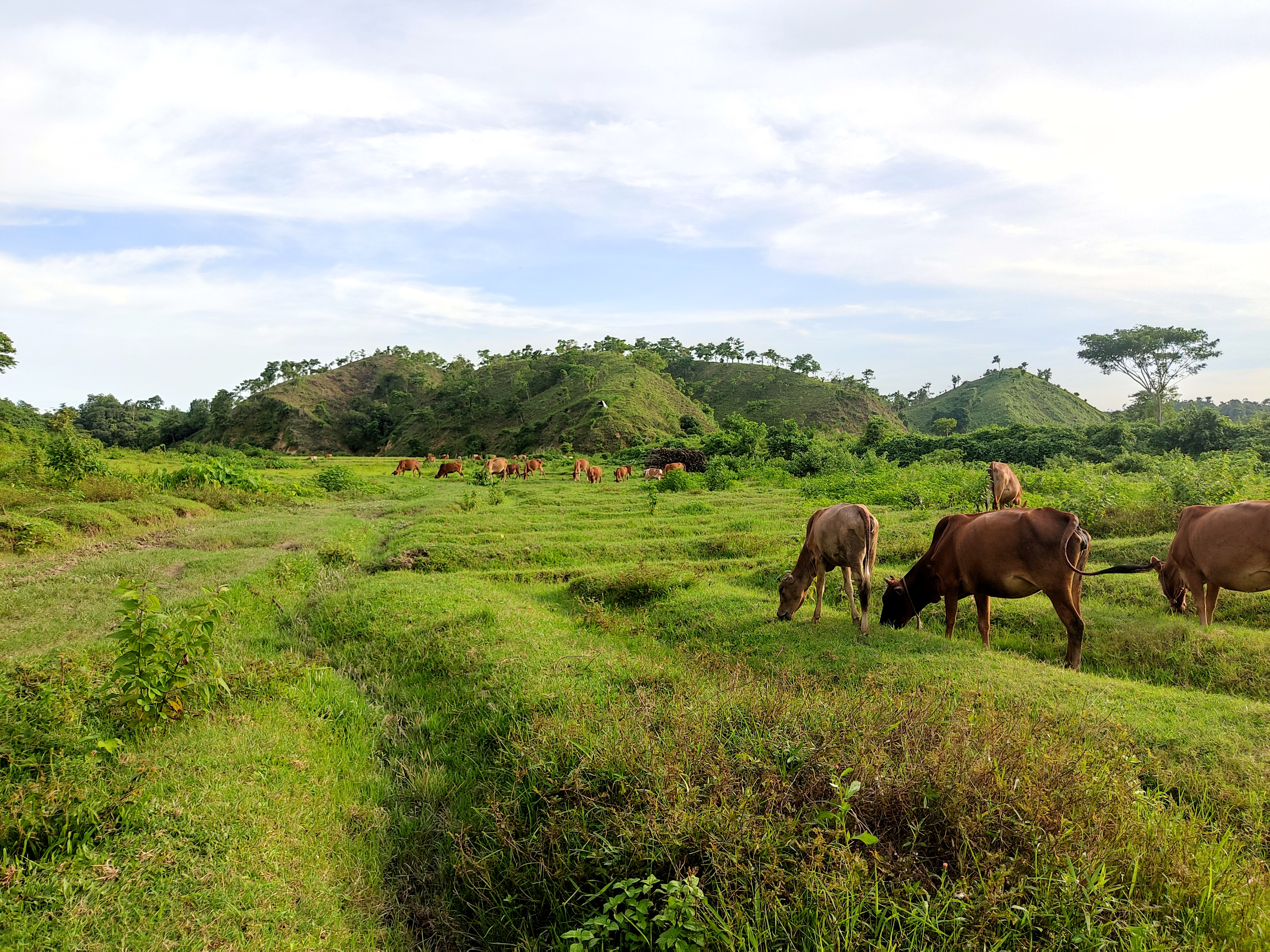
- Hills in Madarsha Union

- Coordinates: 22°06′12″N 92°04′50″E
- Country: Bangladesh
- Division: Chittagong
- District: Chittagong
- Jatiya Sangsad constituency: Part of Chittagong-14 & Chittagong-15
- Headquarters: Satkania Upazila Complex

Government
  - Body: Upazila Council
  - MP: Shajahan Chowdhury & Jashim Uddin Ahammed
  - Chairman: Vacant
  - Chief Executive Officer: Rajeeb Das Purkayastha

Area
  - Total: 280.99 km^{2} (108.49 sq mi)

Population (2022)
  - Total: 454,062
  - Density: 1,615.9/km^{2} (4,185.3/sq mi)
- Time zone: UTC+6 (BST)
- Post code: 4386
- Area code: 03036
- Website: satkania.chittagong.gov.bd

Satkania Upazila mauza geocode map

Satkania (Bengali: সাতকানিয়া) is an upazila of Chattogram District in Chattogram Division, Bangladesh.

== Geography ==
Satkania has a total area of 280.99 km^{2}.

It is bounded by Chandanaish Upazila on the north, Lohagara Upazila on the south, Bandarban Sadar upazila on the east, Banshkhali and Anwara Upazilas on the west. Main river is Sangu, Dalu & Hangor; Main depressions are Goribarjheel, Mahalia.

== Demographics ==
Historical population
Year	Pop. (000)	±%
1981	247,000	—
1991	300,000	+21.5%
2001	339,000	+13.0%
2011	384,806	+13.5%
2022	454,062	+18.0%
Source: Bangladesh Bureau of Statistics

Religions in Satkania Upazila (2022)
Religion	Percent
Islam	91.20%
Hinduism	7.95%
Buddhism	0.83%
Other or not stated	0.02%

According to the 2022 Bangladeshi census, Satkania Upazila had 100,763 households and a population of 454,062. 11.53% of the population were under 5 years of age. Satkania had a literacy rate (age 7 and over) of 80.84%: 82.49% for males and 79.37% for females, and a sex ratio of 90.61 males for every 100 females. 105,566 (23.25%) lived in urban areas.

As of the 2011 Census of Bangladesh, Satkania upazila had 70,808 households and a population of 384,806. 101,447 (26.36%) were under 10 years of age. Satkania had an average literacy rate of 52.75%, compared to the national average of 51.8%, and a sex ratio of 1069 females per 1000 males. 31,206 (7.83%) of the population lived in urban areas.

== Points of interest ==
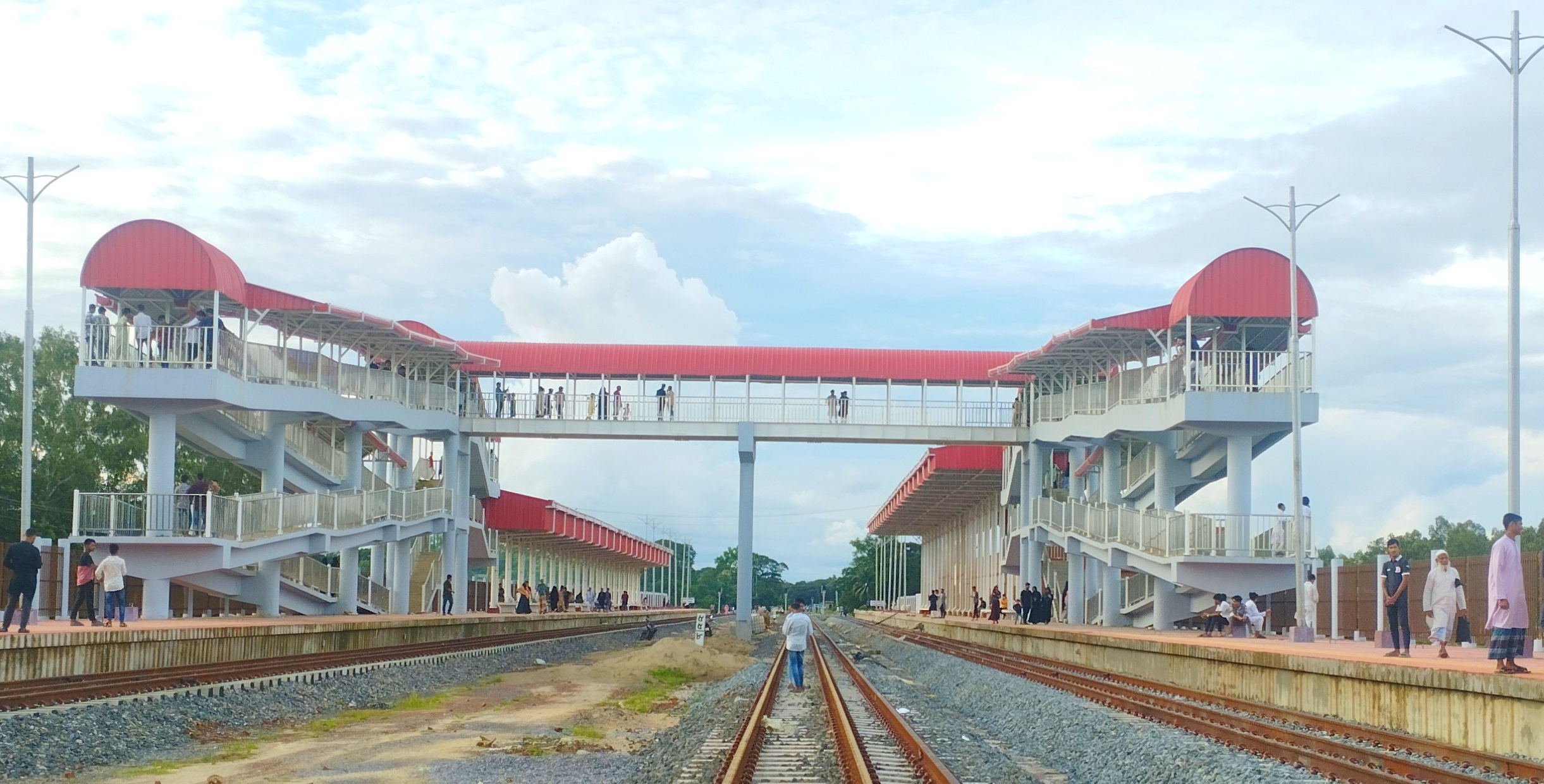
Satkania Railway Station

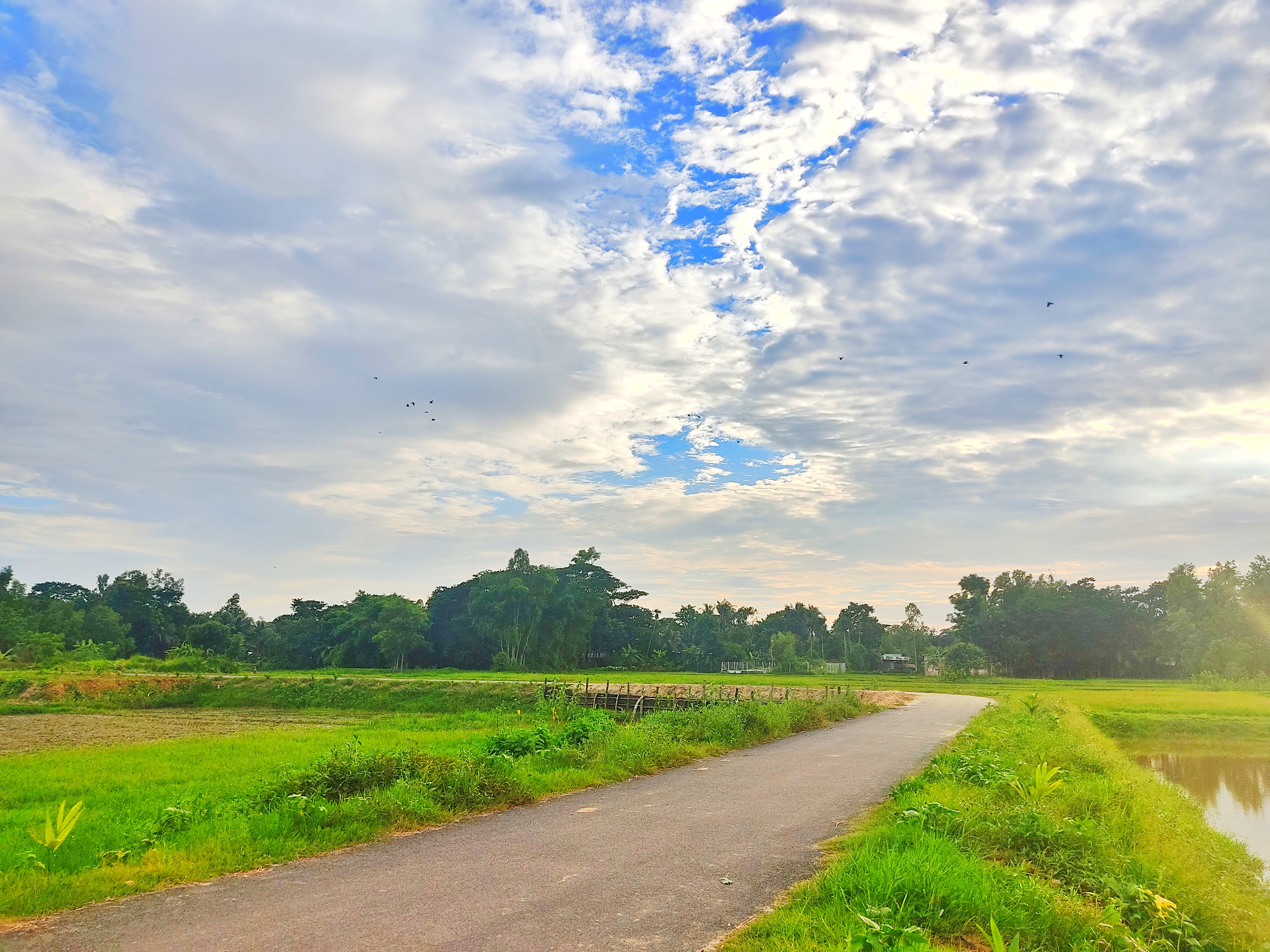
A road of Satkania Upazila

- Sangu River
- Satkania Railway Station
- Katakhali Lake
- Baitul Izzat Area
- Baitarani-Shilghata Forest Area by the river Sangu
- Razar Pahar Charati
- Shahi Eid Gah of Churamani
- Charati and pukuria Belgao Tea Garden
- Amilaish Bill and Charanchal
- Mahaliya Bill (Natural Lake)
- Satyapirer dargah (Baitul Ijjat)
- Forestry area of churamani
- Prantik Lake Holodia
- Thakur Dighi
- Daroga Mosque
- Jangli Pir Mazar, Kanchana
- Ahzgor Shah Ara (Mazar), Sairtali, Sonakania Union
- Al-Monsur Jame Masjid, ChamdarPara, nazu seth barri
- Basar-Mar Pokur, ChhamdarPara, nazu seth barri
- Play ground of Mokkar Boli Khela, Madarsha.
- Dowlat shah Mosjid (DowlatShah para) Alinagor
- Mirzakhil Darbar Sharif
- Sonakania Manziler Dargah
- Kazi Bari Jame Masjid, Kanchana
- West Chitua Para Shahi Jame Masjid, Chituapara

== Administration ==
Satkania thana was established in 1917 and was turned into an upazila in 1983.

Satkania Upazila is divided into Satkania Municipality and 17 union parishads: Amilaish, Bazalia, Charati, Dharmapur, Dhemsa, Eochia, Kaliaish, Kanchana, Keochia, Khagaria, Madarsha, Nalua, Paschim Dhemsa, Purangor, Sadaha, Satkania, and Sonakania. The union parishads are subdivided into 73 mauzas and 84 villages.

Satkania Municipality is subdivided into 9 wards and 19 mahallas.

== Educational institution ==
There are many educational institution. Some of these are:

- Satkania Government College
- Chibbari M.A Motaleb College.
- Satkania Adarsha Mohila College
- Al Helal Adarsha Degree College
- North Satkania Jafor Ahmed Chowdhury College
- Chibbari High School
- Satkania Model High School
- Mirzakhil High School and College

== Notable residents ==
- Abul Fazal, writer and former vice-chancellor of Chittagong University
- Abu Reza Muhammad Nezamuddin, member of parliament (2014–2024), represented Chittagong-15 (Lohagara-Satkania).
- Abdul Motaleb, member of parliament (2024), was previously chairman of the upazila.
- Afzal Ali, medieval poet, lived in Milua.
- A F M Khalid Hossain – Islamic scholar, researcher and writer, adviser to the Bangladesh Interim government
- Alamgir Muhammad Serajuddin – Ekushey Padak recipient Bangladeshi academic
- Abu Saleh – Bangladeshi politician and former MNA
- Dr B M Faizur Rahman – Bangladeshi politician and freedom fighter
- Bimal Guha (born 1952), poet
- Braja Bihari Barua (1934 — 2014), Bangladeshi freedom fighter and politician
- Ibrahim Bin Khalil – Bangladeshi politician and freedom fighter
- Md. Abu Taher – vice-chancellor of the University of Chittagong
- M. Siddique – Bangladeshi politician and freedom fighter
- Shamsul Islam – Bangladeshi politician
- Shahjahan Chowdhury – Bangladeshi politician
- Sukomal Barua – Ekushey Padak Bangladeshi academic

== See also ==
- Upazilas of Bangladesh
- Districts of Bangladesh
- Divisions of Bangladesh
