= Eochia Union =

Eochia Union এওচিয়া ইউনিয়ন
- Union
- Location in Bangladesh
- Coordinates: 22°6′N 92°2′E
- Country: Bangladesh
- Division: Chittagong Division
- District: Chittagong District

Area
  - Total: 23.91 km^{2} (9.23 sq mi)

Population (2011)
  - Total: 19,925
  - Density: 830/km^{2} (2,100/sq mi)
- Time zone: UTC+6 (BST)
- Post code: 4387
- Website: eochiaiup.chittagong.gov.bd

Eochia Union (Bengali: এওচিয়া ইউনিয়ন) is a union parishad of Satkania Upazila in the Division of Chittagong, Bangladesh.

== Area ==
Eochia Union's total area is 23.91 km^{2}

== Population ==
As of 2011, Eochia Union total population is 19,925. There are male 9849 and female 10,076.

== Union chairman ==
List of previous chairmen

Serial No	Name of Chairman	Time of Period
01	Dulal Kanthi Dash	1971-1972
02	Hafez Ahmad	1973-1983
03	Nurul Kobir	1984-1988
04	Hafez Ahmad	1988-1992
05	Nurul Kobir	1993-1997
06	Ahmadul Hoque Chowdhury	1997-2003
07	Jahirul Alam	2004-2007
08	Hafez Ahmad (Incharge)	2007-2011
09	Mahmudul Hoque Chowdhury	2011-2016
10	Nazrul Islam Manik	2016–2022
11	Abu Saleh	2022–2024

== See also ==
- Madarsha Union
