= Madarsha Union =

Madarsha Union মাদার্শা ইউনিয়ন
- Union
- Location in Bangladesh
- Coordinates: 22°4′N 92°1′E
- Country: Bangladesh
- Division: Chittagong Division
- District: Chittagong District
- Upazila: Satkania Upazila

Government
  - Chairman: Abul Hossain (Acting)

Area
  - Total: 21.29 km^{2} (8.22 sq mi)

Population (2011)
  - Total: 34,266
  - Density: 1,600/km^{2} (4,100/sq mi)
- Time zone: UTC+6 (BST)
- Post code: 4386 (Satkania Post Office)
- Website: madarsaup.chittagong.gov.bd

Madarsha Union (Bengali: মাদার্শা ইউনিয়ন) is a union parishad of Satkania Upazila in the Division of Chittagong, Bangladesh.

It has an area of 21.29 square kilometres (8.22 sq mi).

== Geography ==
The union total area is 21.29 square kilometres (8.22 sq mi).

Madarsha Union is located in the south-western part of Satkania Upazila. The distance of this union from Upazila Sadar is about 10 kilometers. Eochia Union is to the north of this union, Satkania Municipality is to the east, Sonakania Union is to the south and Saral Union, Bailchhari Union and Kalipur Union of Banshkhali Upazila are to the west.

Kurulia's Chara is flowing over the Madarsha Union.

== History ==
The Madarsha Union was formed in 1943 during the British rule with the two present villages of Rampur and Madarsha. At that time the chairman of the union was called the village president. During the rule of Pakistan in 1950, the post of village president was declared as the chairman of the union council. In 1954, Oshiuddin Sarkar became the first village president. Abu Noyeem Mohammad Selim Chowdhury is the current Chairman of the Madarsha Union. In 2010, the then administrator separated Rampur village from Madarsha Union and formed a separate union called West Dhemsha Union to facilitate administrative work.

== Population ==
According to the 2011 Bangladesh census, the total population of Madarsha Union was 38,266 at the time.

Density

1600/km^{2} or 4200/mile^{2}.

== Administrative area ==
Madarsha Union is the 7th union of Satkania Upazila. The administrative activities of this union are under Satkania Police Station. It is part of Jatiya Sangsad Constituency No. 292 of Chittagong-15. It is divided into 4 mouzas. The villages of this union are:

- Babunagar
- Rupnagar
- West Madrasha
- Middle Madarsha
- Southern Madrasha
- East Madrasha
- North Madrasha

== Education ==
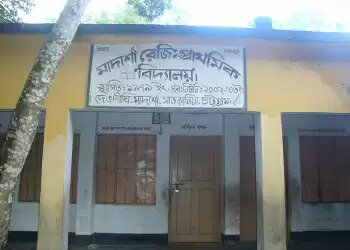
Madarsha Government Primary School

=== Literacy rate ===
According to the educational survey, Madarsha Union's literacy rate was 48% as of 2001.

=== Educational institutions ===
There are three primary schools, one high school and three madrasa.

These are:

Primary schools

- Madarsha Government Primary School
- Babunagar Government Primary school
- Hajrat Shah Fakir Maulana (Rh.) Academy

High School

- Madarsha Kholil-Sofura Adarsha High School

Madrasa

- Baitush Sharaf Adarsha Mohila Madrasha
- Hajarat Abu Huraira (Rh.) Dhakhil Madrasha
- Baitush Sharaf Adarsha Ibtedayee Madrasa

== Health centers ==
The union has the following community clinics:

1. Somitighor Community Clinic
2. Babunogor Community Clinic

== Religious places ==
There are about 30 mosques, 4 Eidgahs and 7 shrines in Madarsha Union.

== Points of interest ==
- Playground of Mokkar Boli Khela
- Hilly region of Madarsha Union.
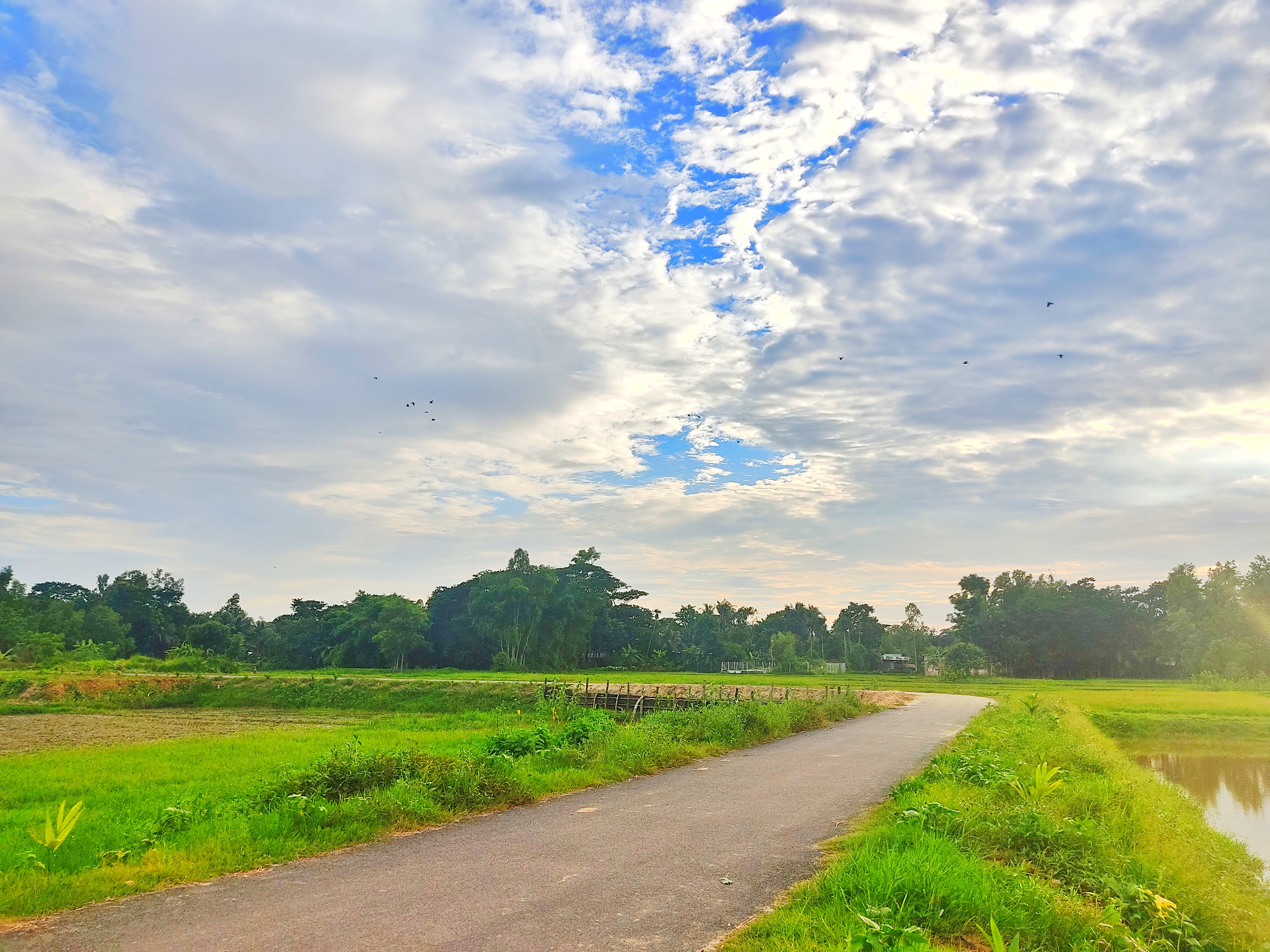
Road and nature at Chairman Para road

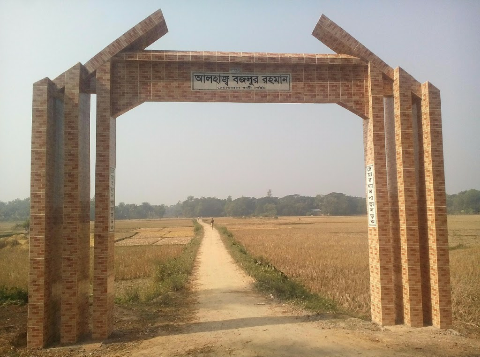
Chairman Para Gate, Madarsha

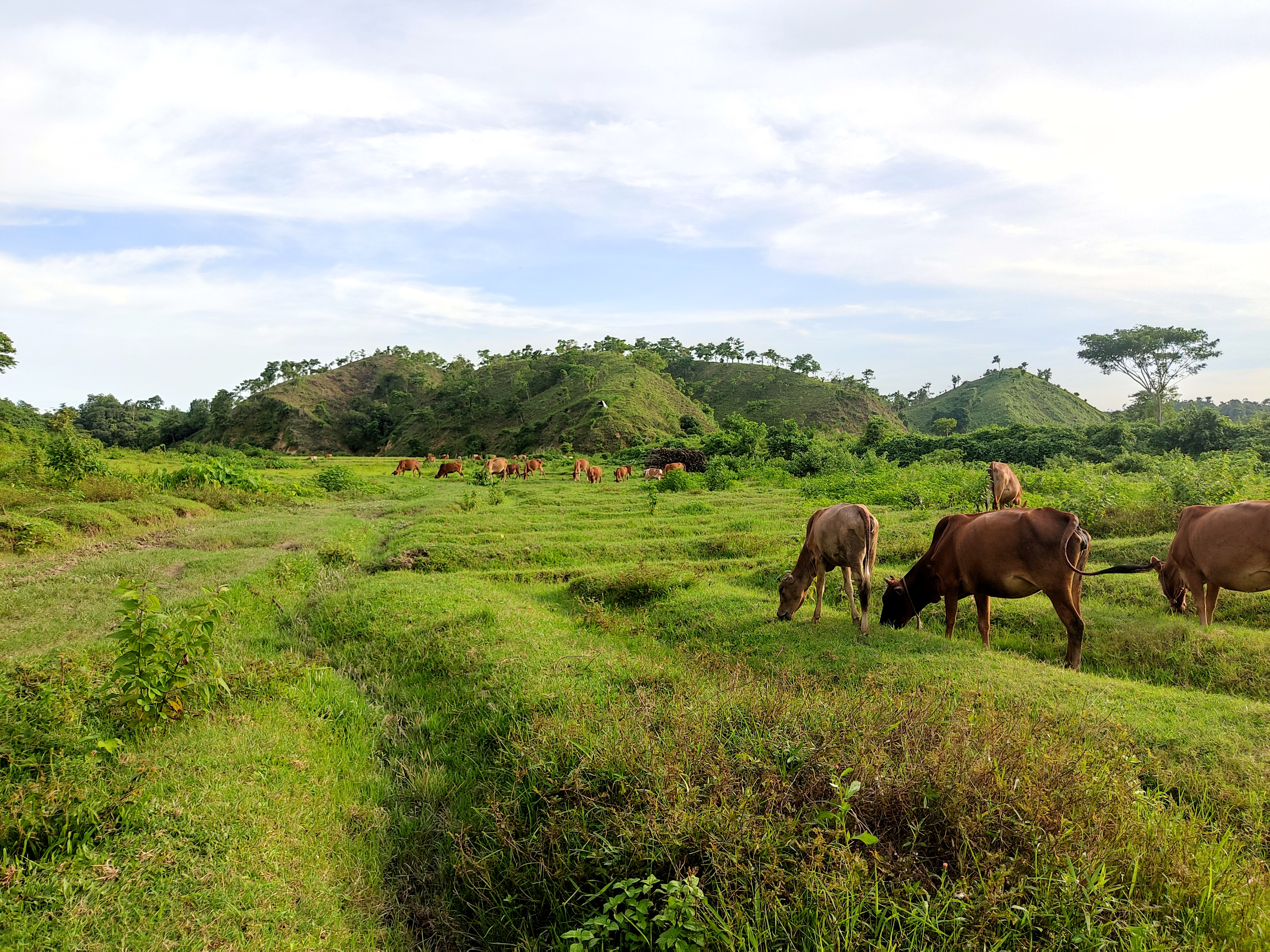
Hilly region of Madarsha Union

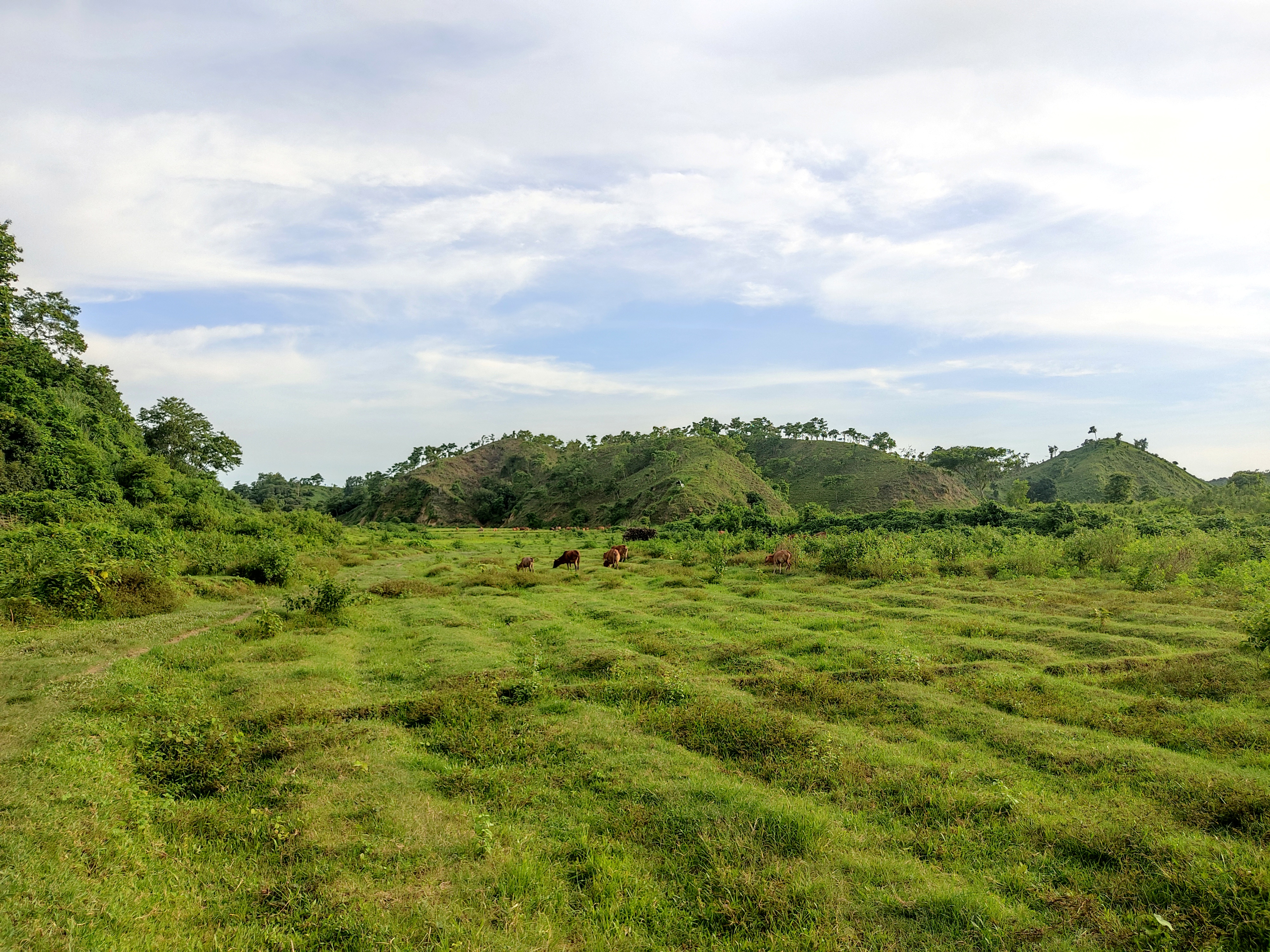
Hilly region of Madarsha Union

== Notable residents ==
- Md. Abu Taher - Former Vice-chancellor of The University of Chittagong
- Abu Reza Muhammad Nezamuddin Nadwi (Former Member of Parliament, Bangladesh)
- A F M Khalid Hossain, Islamic scholar, researcher and writer. (born 1959)

== Chairmen ==
The current chairman of Madarsha Union is Abul Hossain (Acting).

List of Previous Chairmen of Madarsha

Serial No	Name of Chairman	Time of Period
01	Faridul Alam Chowdhury	
02	Ahmad Kabir	
03	Najemul Alam Chowdhury	
04	Bazlur Rahman	
05	Mahmudul Hoque	
06	Faridul Alam	
07	Siddiq Ahmad (acting)	
08	Ahmad Hossain (acting)	
09	Mohammad Ibrahim	2011-2016
10	Abu Noyeem Muhammad Selim Chowdhury	2016–2025
11	Abul Hossain (acting)	2025-present

== See also ==
- Administrative geography of Bangladesh
- Satkania Upazila
- Purangor Union
