= Jafrul Islam Chowdhury =

Bangladeshi politician (1950–2022)

- জাফরুল ইসলাম চৌধুরী
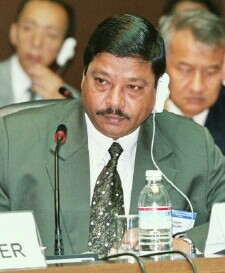
- Chowdhury in 2003

Minister of State for Environment and Forest
- In office 10 October 2001 – 29 October 2006
- Prime Minister: Khaleda Zia
- Succeeded by: Hasan Mahmud

Member of Parliament
- In office 20 December 2008 – 20 November 2013
- Preceded by: Mahmudul Karim Chowdhury
- Succeeded by: Mustafizur Rahaman Chowdhury
- Constituency: Chittagong-16
- In office 19 March 1996 – 29 October 2006
- Preceded by: Sultanul Kabir Chowdhury
- Succeeded by: A.N.M Shamsul Islam
- Constituency: Chittagong-15

Personal details
- Born: 14 October 1950 Banshkhali Upazila, Chittagong District, East Bengal, Pakistan
- Died: 8 November 2022 (aged 72) Chittagong, Bangladesh
- Party: Bangladesh Nationalist Party
- Children: Miskatul Islam Chowdhury

Jafrul Islam Chowdhury (14 October 1950 – 8 November 2022) was a Bangladeshi politician of the Bangladesh Nationalist Party and a four-term Jatiya Sangsad member representing the Chittagong-15 constituency. He served as the state minister for the forest and environment ministry in the Third Khaleda Cabinet during 2001–2006.

== Early life ==
Chowdhury was born on 14 October 1950. He completed his undergraduate degree in commerce.

== Career ==
Chowdhury served as a state minister for environment and forest in the Third Khaleda Cabinet. He was nominated by the Bangladesh Nationalist Party in Chittagong-15 for the 2008 Bangladeshi general election. In June 2009, he was made the joint convenor of the Bangladesh Nationalist Party unit of Chittagong South. In 2010, he served as the Chittagong south district president of the Bangladesh Nationalist Party. He was the only member of parliament from the Bangladesh Nationalist Party in the Bangladesh-Japan Parliamentary Friendship Group. His cousin, Aminur Rahman Chowdhury, was charged with being involved in the murder of 11 members of a Hindu family in the Banshkhali carnage case.

== Personal life and death ==
Chowdhury died in Chittagong on 8 November 2022, at the age of 72.
