= Mahmudul Islam Chowdhury =

Bangladeshi politician

- মাহমুদুল ইসলাম চৌধুরী

1st Mayor of Chittagong
- In office 30 September 1989 – 4 December 1990
- Preceded by: Sekandar Hossain Mia
- Succeeded by: Mir Mohammad Nasiruddin

Member of Parliament
- In office 18 February 1979 – 5 March 1991
- Preceded by: Shah-e-Jahan Chowdhury
- Succeeded by: Sultanul Kabir Chowdhury
- Constituency: Chittagong-15

Personal details
- Born: 1950 (age 75–76) Satkania, Chittagong, East Bengal now Bangladesh
- Party: Jatiya Party (Ershad)
- Education: University of Chittagong

Mahmudul Islam Chowdhury is a Jatiya Party (Ershad) politician and a former member of parliament for Chittagong-15. He was the first mayor of Chittagong City Corporation.

== Career ==
Mahmudul Islam Chowdhury was elected to parliament from Chittagong-15 as a Bangladesh Nationalist Party candidate in the 1979 Bangladeshi general election He was elected to parliament from Chittagong-15 as a Jatiya Party candidate in 1986 and 1988.
