= Md. Nazrul Islam Chowdhury =

Bangladeshi politician (1952–2026)

- মোঃ নজরুল ইসলাম চৌধুরী
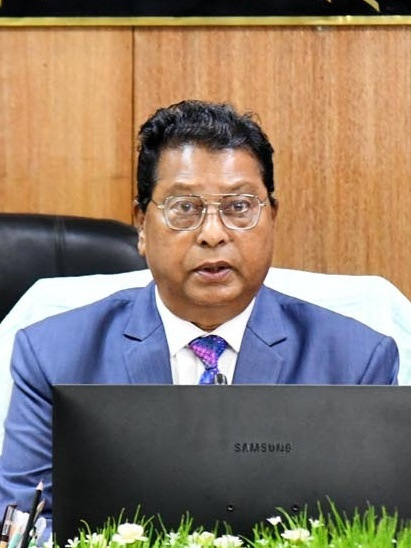
- Chowdhury in 2024

Minister of State for Labour and Employment
- In office 1 March 2024 – 6 August 2024
- Succeeded by: Asif Mahmud

Member of the Bangladesh Parliament for Chittagong-14
- In office 29 January 2014 – 6 August 2024
- Preceded by: Shamsul Islam
- Succeeded by: Jashim Uddin Ahammed

Personal details
- Born: 1 February 1952 Chittagong, East Bengal, Dominion of Pakistan
- Died: 13 July 2026 (aged 74) Dhaka, Bangladesh
- Party: Bangladesh Awami League
- Committees: Standing committee for Ministry of Jute and Textiles and Ministry of Labour and Employment

Md. Nazrul Islam Chowdhury (1 February 1952 – 13 July 2026) was a Bangladeshi Awami League politician who was a onetime member of the Jatiya Sangsad, representing the Chittagong-14 constituency.

== Early life ==
Chowdhury was born on 1 February 1952. He had a B.A. degree.

== Career ==
Chowdhury was elected to parliament from Chittagong-14 on 5 January 2014 as a Bangladesh Awami League candidate. He was a member of parliamentary standing committee for the Ministry of Jute and Textiles and the Ministry of Labour and Employment. He was a parliamentary standing committee member for the Ministry of Civil Aviation and Tourism in the 10th parliament.

== Death ==
Chowdhury died from cancer on 13 July 2026 at the age of 74.
