= Abu Reza Muhammad Nezamuddin =

Bangladeshi Politician

Abu Reza Muhammad Nezamuddin Nadwi
- আবু রেজা মুহাম্মদ নেজামউদ্দিন

Member of Parliament
- In office 29 January 2014 – 10 January 2024
- Preceded by: A.N.M Shamsul Islam
- Succeeded by: Abdul Motaleb
- Constituency: Chittagong-15

Personal details
- Born: 15 August 1968 (age 58)
- Citizenship: Pakistan (1968-1971); Bangladesh (1971-present)
- Party: Bangladesh Awami League
- Spouse: Rizia Sultana Chowdhury
- Relatives: A F M Khalid Hossain (cousin)
- Education: Darul Uloom Nadwatul Ulama
- Occupation: Politics
- Profession: Professor
- Website: aburezanadwi.com

Religious life
- Religion: Islam
- Denomination: Sunni
- Jurisprudence: Hanafi
- Arabic name
- Personal (Ism): Muḥammad Niẓām ad-Dīn محمد نظام الدين
- Patronymic (Nasab): ibn Muḥammad Fayḍullāh بن محمد فيض الله
- Teknonymic (Kunya): Abū Riḍā أبو رضا
- Toponymic (Nisba): an-Nadwī الندوي

Abu Reza Muhammad Nezamuddin Nadwi (Bengali: আবু রেজা মুহাম্মদ নেজামউদ্দিন নদভী) is a Bangladeshi Islamic scholar, educator. He is a former member of parliament for the Chittagong-15 constituency.

== Early life ==
Nezamuddin was born on 15 August 1968. He is a cousin of Dr. Abul Fayez Muhammad Khalid Hossain. Nezamuddin has a Master of Arts and a PhD degree from Darul Uloom Nadwatul Ulama.

== Career ==
Since 14 August 2004, Nadwi has been an associate professor in the Da`wah & Islamic Studies Department of the International Islamic University Chittagong. He has served as the chairman of the Allamah Faizullah Foundation, Darul Hikma Education Foundation, Chittagong International School (CIS), Arabian International Madrasah and Emirates Welfare & Educational Complex Trust. Nadwi is also the director of the Shariah Board of both Social Islami Bank and Union Bank, as well as a member of the Shariah Board of Agrani Bank. He was a member of the Sheikh Zayed Bin Sultan al Nahyan Trust Bangladesh and Islamic Arabic University's Syndicate. Nadwi is currently a member of the International League for Islamic Literature based in Riyadh, Saudi Arabia and the vice-chairman of the executive committee of International Islamic Relief Organization's Bangladesh branch.

Nadwi contested as an Awami League candidate at the 2014 Bangladeshi general election, winning the seat for the Chittagong-15 constituency. He retained his seat for a second term at the 2018 Bangladeshi general election. Nadwi is a member of the Ministry of Religious Affairs's parliamentary standing committee and a governor of Islamic Foundation Bangladesh.

== Personal life ==
Nezamuddin is married to Rizia Sultana Chowdhury, a member of the central committee of the Women's Awami League.
