= Mustafizur Rahaman Chowdhury =

Bangladeshi politician

- মোস্তাফিজুর রহমান চৌধুরী

Member of Parliament
- In office 5 January 2014 – 10 January 2024
- Preceded by: Jafrul Islam Chowdhury
- Succeeded by: Mujibur Rahman
- Constituency: Chittagong-16

Personal details
- Born: December 20, 1957 (age 67)
- Political party: Bangladesh Awami League
- Education: B.A, M.A

Mustafizur Rahaman Chowdhury (Bengali: মোস্তাফিজুর রহমান চৌধুরী) is a Bangladesh Awami League politician and former Member of Parliament from Chittagong-16.

== Early life ==
Chowdhury was born on 20 December 1957. He has a B.A. and a M.A. degree.

== Career ==
Chowdhury was elected to parliament in 2014 from Chittagong-16 as a Bangladesh Awami League candidate.

== Controversy ==
On 1 June 2016, he was accused of assaulting Zahidul Islam, an upazila election officer, during the Union Parishad polls. The election officer complained to the Dèputy Commissioner (DC) who notified Bangladesh Election Commission. Zahidul Islam filed a case with the Banshkhali Police Station against Chowdhury and two of his associates. The Bangladesh High Court asked him to appear before the court by 20 June 2016 and ordered law enforcement agencies to arrest him if he fails to appear before the court. He secured bail from Judicial Magistrate Md Sajjad Hossain of local court on 16 June.
