= Chittagong-14 =

Bangladeshi parliamentary constituency

Coordinates: 22.21°N 92.01°E

- Constituency for the Jatiya Sangsad
- District: Chittagong District
- Division: Chittagong Division
- Electorate: 313,513 (2026)

Current constituency
- Created: 1973
- Party: Bangladesh Nationalist Party
- Member: Jashim Uddin Ahammed
- ← 290 Chittagong-13 292 Chittagong-15 →

Chittagong-14 is a constituency represented in the Jatiya Sangsad (National Parliament) of Bangladesh since 2026 by Jashim Uddin Ahammed of the Bangladesh Nationalist Party.

== Boundaries ==
The constituency encompasses Chandanaish Upazila and six union parishads of Satkania Upazila: Bazalia, Dharmapur, Kaliais, Keochia, Khagaria, Puranagar.

== History ==
The constituency was created for the first general elections in newly independent Bangladesh, held in 1973.

Ahead of the 2008 general election, the Election Commission redrew constituency boundaries to reflect population changes revealed by the 2001 Bangladesh census. The 2008 redistricting altered the boundaries of the constituency.

Ahead of the 2014 general election, the Election Commission renumbered the seat for Chittagong-16 (Sandwip) to Chittagong-3, bumping up by one the suffix of the former constituency of that name and higher numbered constituencies in the district. Thus Chittagong-14 covers the area previously covered by Chittagong-13. Previously Chittagong-14 encompassed Lohagara and all but seven union parishads of Satkania: Bazalia, Dharmapur, Kaliais, Keochia, Khagaria, Puranagar, and Sadaha.

== Members of Parliament ==
| Election | Member | Party |
|---|---|---|
| 1973 | M. Siddique | Awami League |
| 1979 | Mostaq Ahmed Chowdhury | Bangladesh Nationalist Party |
| 1986 | Ibrahim Bin Khalil | Awami League |
| 1991 | Shajahan Chowdhury | Bangladesh Jamaat-e-Islami |
| Feb 1996 | Oli Ahmad | Bangladesh Nationalist Party |
| Jun 1996 | Oli Ahmad | Bangladesh Nationalist Party |
| 2001 | Shajahan Chowdhury | Bangladesh Jamaat-e-Islami |
| 2008 | Shamsul Islam | Bangladesh Jamaat-e-Islami |
Major Boundary Changes
| 2014 | Nazrul Islam Chowdhury | Awami League |
| 2018 | Nazrul Islam Chowdhury | Awami League |
| 2024 | Nazrul Islam Chowdhury | Awami League |
| 2026 | Jashim Uddin Ahammed | Bangladesh Nationalist Party |

== Elections ==
=== Elections in the 2020s ===
General Election 2026: Chittagong-10
| Party | Candidate | Votes | % | ±% |
|---|---|---|---|---|
| BNP | Jashim Uddin Ahammed | 76,493 | 41.9 | N/A |
| LDP | Omar Farooq | 75,467 | 41.3 | N/A |
| BIF | Md. Solaiman | 22,992 | 12.6 | N/A |
| Independent | Mohammad Mizanul Haque Chowdhury | 3,630 | 2.0 | N/A |
| IAB | Mohammad Abdul Hamid | 1,539 | 0.8 | N/A |
| Independent | Shfiqul Islam Rahi | 1,165 | 0.6 | N/A |
| JP(E) | Mohammad Badshah Mia | 293 | 0.2 | N/A |
| IBB | H. M. Elias | 149 | 0.1 | N/A |
| Majority | | 1,026 | 0.6 | N/A |
| Turnout | | 182,754 | 58.3 | N/A |
| BNP gain from AL | | | | |

=== Elections in the 2010s ===
Nazrul Islam Chowdhury was elected unopposed in the 2014 general election after opposition parties withdrew their candidacies in a boycott of the election.

=== Elections in the 2000s ===
General Election 2008: Chittagong-14
| Party | Candidate | Votes | % | ±% |
|---|---|---|---|---|
| Jamaat | Shamsul Islam | 120,339 | 51.1 | +3.2 |
| LDP | Oli Ahmad | 63,412 | 26.9 | N/A |
| AL | AKM Sirajul Islam Chowdury | 49,472 | 21.0 | −1.2 |
| Independent | Jafar Ahmad Chowdhury | 924 | 0.4 | N/A |
| Gano Forum | Abdul Chowdhury | 893 | 0.4 | N/A |
| Bangladesh Kalyan Party | Anamul Haque Chowdhury | 393 | 0.2 | N/A |
| Majority | | 56,927 | 24.2 | +5.4 |
| Turnout | | 235,433 | 86.9 | +12.3 |
| Jamaat hold | | | | |

General Election 2001: Chittagong-14
| Party | Candidate | Votes | % | ±% |
|---|---|---|---|---|
| Jamaat | Shajahan Chowdhury | 105,773 | 47.9 | +21.1 |
| BNP | Oli Ahmad | 64,184 | 29.1 | −19.1 |
| AL | Jafar Ahmad Chowdhury | 48,932 | 22.2 | −0.3 |
| IJOF | Ibrahim Bin Khalil | 1,206 | 0.6 | N/A |
| CPB | Apurba Charan Das | 458 | 0.2 | N/A |
| Bangladesh Progressive Party | Syed Mostafa Jamal | 338 | 0.2 | N/A |
| Majority | | 41,589 | 18.8 | −2.8 |
| Turnout | | 220,891 | 74.6 | +4.1 |
| Jamaat gain from BNP | | | | |

=== Elections in the 1990s ===
General Election June 1996: Chittagong-14
| Party | Candidate | Votes | % | ±% |
|---|---|---|---|---|
| BNP | Oli Ahmad | 75,855 | 48.2 | +25.3 |
| Jamaat | Shajahan Chowdhury | 41,860 | 26.6 | −3.3 |
| AL | Md.Mainuddin Hasan Chowdhury | 35,432 | 22.5 | −7.4 |
| IOJ | Abdul Halim Bokhari | 2,056 | 1.3 | N/A |
| JP(E) | Ibrahim Bin Khalil | 1,208 | 0.8 | N/A |
| NAP (Bhashani) | Khondaker Fokhre Alam | 761 | 0.5 | N/A |
| Zaker Party | Mohammad Shahedul Alam Chowdhury | 183 | 0.1 | N/A |
| Majority | | 33,995 | 21.6 | +5.3 |
| Turnout | | 157,355 | 70.5 | 21.0 |
| BNP gain from Jamaat | | | | |

General Election 1991: Chittagong-14
| Party | Candidate | Votes | % | ±% |
|---|---|---|---|---|
| Jamaat | Shajahan Chowdhury | 62,897 | 46.2 | |
| AL | Akhtaruzzaman Chowdhury Babu | 40,659 | 29.9 | |
| BNP | Mostafizur Rahman Chowdhury | 31,145 | 22.9 | |
| BAKSAL | Mahfuzur Rahman Chowdhury | 1,449 | 1.1 | |
| Majority | | 22,238 | 16.3 | |
| Turnout | | 136,150 | 49.5 | |
| Jamaat gain from AL | | | | |
