= A.N.M Shamsul Islam (Chittagong politician) =

Bangladeshi politician

- আ.ন.ম শামসুল ইসলাম

Member of Parliament
- In office 25 January 2009 – 24 January 2014
- Preceded by: Jafrul Islam Chowdhury
- Succeeded by: Abu Reza Muhammad Nezamuddin
- Constituency: Chittagong-15

President of Bangladesh Sramik Kallyan Federation
- In office 12 November 2019 – 12 April 2026
- Preceded by: Mia Golam Parwar
- Succeeded by: Advocate Atikur Rahman

Chairman of BOT of IIUC
- Incumbent
- Assumed office 11 February 1995

President of Bangladesh Islami Chhatra Shibir
- In office 1 January 1988 – 30 December 1989
- Preceded by: Syed Abdullah Muhammad Taher
- Succeeded by: Dr. Aminul Islam Mukul

Personal details
- Born: 1 March 1957 (age 69) Satkania, Chittagong, East Pakistan now Bangladesh
- Party: Bangladesh Jamaat-e-Islami
- Education: Chittagong University, Dhaka University
- Occupation: Politician

A.N.M Shamsul Islam (Bengali: আ ন ম শামসুল ইসলাম; born 1 March 1957) is a Bangladeshi politician. and a former member of parliament representing the Chittagong-15 constituency. He is the former president of Bangladesh Sramik Kallyan Federation, and currently serving as Naib-e-Ameer of Bangladesh Jamaat-e-Islami.

== Early life ==
He was born on 1 March 1957 in Chittagong District under Satkania Upazila at Barodona Village. His father's name Mohammad Ali Miah and mother's name is Hafeza Amena Khatun. His father was a government employee and mother was a Hafez of the Quran. He has 6 siblings.

== Career ==
Shamsul Islam was closely connected to political and social activities from his student life. He was the elected president of Bangladesh Islami Chhatra Shibir, Chittagong North Zone, in 1978. He was the president of Chittagong University Zone of Bangladesh Islami Chhatra Shibir from October 1981 to September 1985. He was elected central secretary general of Bangladesh Islami Chhatra Shibir in 1985, and central president in 1987.

He handled numerous social services and security programs beginning in 1989. Besides professional activities, he joined Bangladesh Jamaat-e-Islami. He was the elected Secretary of Chittagong city Zone of Bangladesh Jamaat-e-Islami. He had to go to jail because of his movement against autocracy in 1999. He was the elected Ameer of Chittagong City Zone of Bangladesh Jamaat-e-Islami from 2000. He was elected as member of parliament in National Election of 2008 at Chittagong-14 (Satkania-Lohagara).

He is the candidate of Chittagong-15 (Satkania-Lohagara) in the national election of 30 December 2018.

Shamsul Islam is the chairman of the board of trustees of International Islamic University, Chittagong, and is now the senior vice chairman of the board of trustees of Chittagong International Medical College and Hospital.

He is the president of Bangladesh Sramik Kalyan Federation. He was the acting Ameer of Bangladesh Jamaat-e-Islam.

=== Imprisonment ===
He was sent to prison for the conspiracy of government party three times in last few years. He spent more than two and half year in prison.
