= Shah-e-Jahan Chowdhury =

Bangladeshi politician

Member of Bangladesh Parliament
- In office 1973–1979
- Succeeded by: Mahmudul Islam Chowdhury

Personal details
- Political party: Bangladesh Awami League

Shah-e-Jahan Chowdhury is a Bangladesh Awami League politician and a former member of parliament for Chittagong-15.

== Career ==
Chowdhury was elected to parliament from Chittagong-15 as a Bangladesh Awami League candidate in 1973.
