= Ashab Uddin Ahmad =

Bangladeshi communist politician and freedom fighter

Ashab Uddin Ahmad MLA
- আসহাব উদ্দীন আহমদ
- Born: 1914; Sadhanpur, Bengal Presidency, British India
- Died: 28 May 1994 (aged 80); Dhaka, Bangladesh
- Education: Chittagong College (BA); University of Dhaka (MA)
- Occupations: Teacher; writer; politician
- Years active: 1939–1994
- Employer(s): Chittagong College; Chittagong Islamia Intermediate College; Comilla Victoria College
- Political party: Communist Party of Bangladesh (Marxist–Leninist)
- Other political affiliations: Awami League; United Front; National Awami Party; Communist Party of East Pakistan
- Movement: Bengali language movement; Bengali nationalism; Communism
- Awards: Ekushey Padak

Ashab Uddin Ahmad (Note: also known as Ashabuddin Ahmad, Ashab Uddin Ahmed or Mohammed Ashabuddin Ahmad;) (Bengali: আসহাব উদ্দীন আহমদ; April 1914 – 28 May 1994) was a Bangladeshi writer, educator and politician. He was a member of the East Bengal Legislative Assembly for the United Front, and a Communist activist. In 2005, he was posthumously awarded the Ekushey Padak, one of the highest civilian awards in Bangladesh, for his contributions to literature, which include 24 published books in Bengali and English.

== Early life and background ==
Ashab Uddin was born in April 1914, in Sadhanpur, a village in what is now Banshkhali Upazila of the Chittagong District of Bangladesh, which was then part of the British Indian province of Bengal. He belonged to a middle-class Muslim family. His father was a tea plantation manager named Munshi Safar Ali Chowdhury. Safar Ali had five children from his first marriage and six from his second marriage with Ashab Uddin's mother, Nasima Khatun. Among Safar Ali's sons, Ashab Uddin was the second-youngest. According to Ashab Uddin, his ancestors were from the Gaur region, and one of his ancestors had moved to Sadhanpur while serving the Mughal Empire, possibly under Shah Shuja.

== Education ==
Ashab Uddin's education began in a maktab, after which he attended a "minor school", followed by the Sadhanpur English Middle School and the Banigram High School, from which he graduated in 1932. While studying at the Banigram High School, Ashab Uddin organised a library in Sadhanpur, which he named the Sadhanpur Rural Welfare Library. This was the first library in Sadhanpur, and one of the few in the area. One of his aims was to open a library in a Muslim-majority rural area, as all the rural libraries he knew of were located in Hindu neighbourhoods. Together with his friends, he raised money for the library by working as a waiter at weddings. Using this money, he purchased books for the library and subscribed the library to several periodicals. Ashab Uddin and his friends also staged an anti-moneylender play that they had read in one of these periodicals.

In 1934, Ashab Uddin Ahmad obtained an IA degree from Chittagong College, securing a scholarship of Rs. 20 per month. In 1936, he graduated from Chittagong College with a BA. He obtained an MA in English from the University of Dhaka in 1939.

== Teaching and activism ==
Ashab Uddin Ahmad began teaching English in September 1939 at his alma mater, Chittagong College, buying his first suit and tie prior to starting work there, as wearing these was compulsory for professors at state colleges under the British Raj. He was forced to leave this position in April 1941 as a result of a conflict with the principal, Padmini Bhusan Rudra.

In July 1941, he was hired by the Chittagong Islamia Intermediate College (now known as Government Hazi Mohammad Mohshin College), where he remained until 1945. One of his students there was Abdul Karim, who would later become the vice-chancellor of the University of Chittagong. Abdul Karim reminisced later that Ashab Uddin Ahmad's lectures on prose and poetry were so engaging that listening to them was sufficient preparation for an examination. He also noted that Ashab Uddin had helped him as well as other students with advice, money and books as needed.

In 1945, Ashab Uddin Ahmad joined Laksam Faizunnesa College, moving to Feni College in 1948, and Comilla Victoria College in 1950.

=== Language Movement ===
Although Ashab Uddin had supported the Pakistan Movement ever since the Lahore Resolution of 1940, he became disillusioned with Pakistan within a few months of the creation of the state. In his view, the Pakistani elite misused Islam as a way to promote its class interests at the expense of the country's "Sindhi, Baluch, Pathan and Bengali" peoples. On 27 December 1948, the Pakistani minister of education, Fazlur Rahman, declared that the Arabic script should be used to write all the languages of Pakistan. In practice, this suggestion, if implemented, would only have affected Bengali, as all the languages of West Pakistan already used the Arabic script. Ashab Uddin wrote to the Pakistan Observer in 1950 to protest against Fazlur Rahman's suggestion.

Around the same time, Ashab Uddin, together with a fellow professor at Comilla Victoria College named Abul Khair, founded a cultural organisation named the Pragati Majlis (Progress Assembly). The organisation was headquartered in Comilla, in rented premises across the street from the town hall. The Pragati Majlis organised discussions on the future of Bengali culture and the Bengali nation in general, and drew an audience largely consisting of professors and students from the Comilla Victoria College. The activities of the organisation were viewed with suspicion both by the Muslim League and by the state. Nevertheless, it was shielded from persecution by the influential non-Bengali principal of Comilla Victoria College, Akhtar Hameed Khan, who was on friendly terms with Ashab Uddin.

In 1952, following the killing of several people at a protest march in Dhaka demanding that Bengali be made an official language of Pakistan, a demonstration was held in Comilla to echo the demands made in Dhaka and express solidarity with the victims. Ashab Uddin and Abul Khair led a number of students of Comilla Victoria College to join the procession, which stretched out for a mile. The main slogan voiced by the protesters was, "We want Bengali to be a state language. We want Nurul Amin's neck." Prior to the Comilla protest, Ashab Uddin had talked to local Muhajir leaders in order to persuade them not to oppose the Bengali language movement. As a result, after the demonstration, one Muhajir leader gave a speech in Urdu at the Comilla town hall in support of granting Bengali the status of a state language.

=== Meeting with Ayub Khan ===
In October 1952, Ashab Uddin Ahmad joined a "Teachers' Goodwill Mission" to West Pakistan, organised by the East Bengal Non-Governmental College Teachers' Association. Among the places they visited was Saidu Sharif, the capital of the princely state of Swat. The members of the Teachers' Goodwill Mission were received on the day after their arrival in Swat by the ruler of the state, Abdul-Haqq Jahan Zeb. The dinner thrown in the teachers' honour by Jahan Zeb was also attended by Ayub Khan, then the Chief of Army Staff (whose daughter was married to Jahan Zeb's son), as well as several other federal government officials. During the meal, Ayub Khan happened to sit across the table from Ashab Uddin Ahmad. After dinner, Ayub engaged Ashab Uddin in conversation and told him that East Bengal was nothing but "water", "population" and "student trouble". He also suggested that if the Bengalis did not like Pakistan, they could "go to the Baboos", i.e. Indians. For his part, Ashab Uddin reminded Ayub that, in the provincial elections of 1946, the Muslim League had attained its best results in Bengal. Given that the creation of Pakistan was the main electoral issue, it was in fact Bengali Muslims who had made Pakistan possible, in Ashab Uddin's view.

Although Ayub Khan seemed to accept the above argument made by Ashab Uddin Ahmad, the latter was left sorely disappointed, and afterwards cited this as an example of the "ill will" the Teachers' Goodwill Mission had met with in West Pakistan. Ashab Uddin found it particularly surprising that Ayub Khan viewed the Bengali Language Movement as a separatist struggle at a time when the participants of this movement did not harbour separatist views. In Ashab Uddin's view, this prejudice against Bengalis on the part of Ayub and the rest of the Pakistani elite ultimately resulted in Ayub's words being prophetic, and Bangladesh becoming independent in 1971 with the help of the "Baboos" mentioned by Ayub.

=== Literature Conference ===
In 1953, Ashab Uddin Ahmad and Abul Khair organised the first All-East-Bengal Literature Conference at the Comilla town hall, under the auspices of the Pragati Majlis. A number of noteworthy East Bengali writers and journalists attended this conference, including Abdul Karim Sahitya Bisharad.

In December 1953, Ashab Uddin Ahmad quit his job at Comilla Victoria College to go into politics.

== Political life ==
By 1953, Ashab Uddin Ahmad was a member of the Awami League, led by Abdul Hamid Khan Bhashani, and put forward his candidacy for the Banshkhali seat in the East Bengal Legislative Assembly elections of 1954 on a United Front ticket, the United Front being an alliance of parties of which the Awami League was the most important part.

=== Dhar controversy ===
The election campaign began soon after the publication of Ashab Uddin's book Dhar (Loan). Some of his readers misinterpreted certain passages in that book as attacks against Islam. What caused particular consternation was his contention that it was useless to listen to a Friday prayer sermon if one could not understand its meaning. A rival candidate, Amirul Haq Khan Bahadur, bought up all the copies of Dhar that he could buy in the bookshops of Chittagong and had his canvassers carry copies with them on the campaign trail, damaging Ashab Uddin's chances of getting elected. Shortly before the election, a famous Islamic scholar, not named by Ashab Uddin in his recollections, visited Banshkhali. When some locals approached the scholar with objections to certain passages in Ashab Uddin's book, the scholar replied that he was not sufficiently well-versed in Bengali or English to judge the author's argument. Nevertheless, he promised to conduct an istikharah prayer to determine the author's level of faith. Ashab Uddin passed a sleepless night at home, feeling that he was being subjected to the whims of the Delphic oracle. To his immense relief, however, the scholar declared after the dawn prayer the following day that Ashab Uddin was a faithful and trustworthy man. Eventually, he was elected to the East Bengal Legislative Assembly with a majority of the votes in his constituency.

=== Petition incident ===
As a member of the Legislative Assembly (MLA), Ashab Uddin Ahmad was a member of the Awami League Central Committee. At the same time, he secretly cooperated with the Communist Party of East Pakistan, and would meet with its leaders, such as Moni Singh, in Dhaka. As a result of his left-wing sympathies, Ashab Uddin was arrested in 1954, and imprisoned in Chittagong. His cellmate was Prof. Ekhlasur Rahman, who was working as a chemist at the Karnaphuli Paper Mills in Chandraghona. Rahman, along with several other people, had been charged with organising a riot between Bengali Muslim and non-Bengali Muslim workers at the factory. In Ashab Uddin's view, Rahman was innocent, and the riot had been organised by the Pakistani federal government, with the help of the director of the paper mill. When Ashab Uddin was released from prison, Rahman asked him to intervene with the government on behalf of the accused.

Ashab Uddin then had a petition drawn up by a lawyer, and got it signed by 47 MLAs. The petition was addressed to the federal law minister, Huseyn Shaheed Suhrawardy. Once the petition was ready, Suhrawardy informed the Awami League executive Abdus Samad Azad that Ashab Uddin could bring the petition to him. Thus, Ashab Uddin Ahmad and Azad duly visited Suhrawardy to deliver the petition. When they arrived, however, Suhrawardy pretended not to recognise them, astonishing Ashab Uddin. He took the petition from Ashab Uddin's hands and returned it to him, telling him in English that the "Law cannot be altered". In Ashab Uddin's view, Suhrawardy misunderstood the intent of the petition, as what the petition was asking for was not a change in the law, but rather that the law be applied correctly. Eventually, Ekhlasur Rahman was tried by the High Court of East Pakistan and acquitted. Ashab Uddin's view of Suhrawardy, however, never recovered from this incident.

=== Autonomy resolution and opposition to Suhrawardy ===
On 27 March 1955, Governor-General Sir Ghulam Muhammad changed the name of East Bengal to East Pakistan. Consequently, the erstwhile East Bengal Legislative Assembly came to be known as the East Pakistan Assembly. Meanwhile, the United Front collapsed due to its inability to implement the platform under which it was elected, known as the 21-point plan. On 4 September 1956, the Awami League formed a provincial government headed by Ataur Rahman Khan, in coalition with five smaller parties. Eight days later, on 12 September, Huseyn Shaheed Suhrawardy of the Awami League became the prime minister of Pakistan, at the head of a coalition government. Thus, for the first time ever, the Awami League held the positions of prime minister of Pakistan and chief minister of East Pakistan simultaneously. Nevertheless, the 21-point programme remained largely unimplemented. Abdul Hamid Bhashani, the president of the Awami League, convened the a five-day Kagmari Conference which was funded by Yar Mohammad Khan the treasurer of the Awami League also the founder and publisher of The Daily Ittefaq and Mirza Mehdy Ispahani in February 1957 to promote autonomy for East Pakistan and a neutral foreign policy for Pakistan. Bhashani was unhappy with the military alliance between Pakistan and the US and wanted Pakistan to withdraw from all military treaty relationships it had with the US. At the conference, during a meeting of the Awami League Central Committee, Suhrawardy said to Ashab Uddin in English, "you do not want that I should remain Prime Minister of Pakistan". He added that Bhashani did not want him to keep the position either. In response, Ashab Uddin said to him in Bengali, "people voted for me not in order for me to pawn Pakistan to American imperialism." The following day, the Awami League Council met and voted by a wide margin to cancel the Pakistani military alliance with the US. Bhashani, meanwhile, gave a speech in which he said if East Pakistan did not get autonomy, it would be forced to bid goodbye to West Pakistan.

Finally, as a result of this pressure from left-leaning members of the Awami League, the provincial government allowed a private members' bill in support of provincial autonomy for East Pakistan to be brought before the East Pakistan Assembly. Thus, on 3 April 1957, several members of the East Pakistan Assembly moved four different versions of a resolution in support of granting East Pakistan autonomy. All members of the cabinet, other than Dhirendranath Datta and Sheikh Mujibur Rahman, withdrew from the assembly chamber, so as not to appear to back the resolution. During the ensuing debate, Ashab Uddin Ahman spoke in favour of the motion, alongside Muzaffar Ahmed, Sheikh Mujibur Rahman, Mohiuddin Ahmed, Chitta Ranjan Sutar, Razia Banu and Ashutosh Singha.

In his speech in Bengali in favour of the resolution, Ashab Uddin Ahmad said that "it was on the demand for autonomy that Pakistan was founded", as could be seen in the Lahore Resolution, and that consequently opposing autonomy for East Pakistan meant opposing Pakistan. He also argued that the 21-point plan, which, as he reminded the assembly, Suhrawardy was formally committed to, could not be implemented without the implementation of the 19th point, which called for regional autonomy. Giving a detailed breakdown of Pakistani government expenditure in East Pakistan and West Pakistan between 1947 and 1956, Ashab Uddin showed that the federal government had spent Rs. 3,280,000,000 in East Pakistan and Rs. 20,760,000,000 in West Pakistan. Ashab Uddin argued that, given that Pakistan, like an eagle, had two wings, both wings had to be strong. Lastly, he stated that "full regional autonomy" was necessary "for our freedom". At the end of the debate, a majority of the members of the East Pakistan Assembly voted in favour of one of the four versions of the resolution, calling for "full Provincial Autonomy for East Pakistan", with only currency, foreign affairs and defence to remain under the purview of the federal government. Ashab Uddin Ahmad later stated that he saw his contribution to this resolution to be his most significant act as an MLA.

On 13 June 1957, the Awami League Council was convened again, this time by Sheikh Mujibur Rahman in Dhaka. Ashab Uddin believed that Mujibur Rahman had inflated the membership of the council by issuing several hundred dubious membership cards. Moreover, there was intimidation used at the council meeting against the most left-wing members, such as Ashab Uddin and Mohammad Toaha. This council meeting voted to support the Pakistani-US military alliance.

As a result, Bhashani decided to leave the Awami League and form a new party called the All-Pakistan National Awami Party (NAP). This party's main demands would remain the same as Bhashani's earlier demands within the Awami League: that East Pakistan be granted autonomy, and that Pakistan observe neutrality in foreign relations. Following Bhashani's lead, Ashab Uddin switched his allegiance from the Awami League to the NAP. Delegates attending the inaugural NAP convention were attacked with sticks by thugs allegedly hired by the Awami League, but ultimately the formation of the party could not be prevented.

=== End of the East Pakistan Assembly ===
On 7 October 1958, President Iskander Mirza instituted martial law, which dissolved the federal parliament and provincial assemblies. Arrest warrants were issued against certain members of the East Pakistan Assembly, including Ashab Uddin Ahmad. He was able to leave his house 20 minutes before the police arrived to arrest him. Subsequently, he went into hiding, and took part in the underground anti-Ayub-Khan movement after Ayub replaced Iskander Mirza.

=== Communist activism and the 1971 war ===
In 1966, as a consequence of the Sino-Soviet split occasioned by Nikita Khrushchev's Secret Speech of 1956, the Communist Party of East Pakistan split in two, with the East Pakistan Communist Party (Marxist–Leninist) separating to become a pro-Chinese Communist Party organization. It was the latter party that Ashab Uddin Ahmad joined.

When the Bangladesh Liberation War broke out in 1971, Ashab Uddin Ahmad and Sudhanshu Bimal Datta decided not to leave the country, as many other political leaders were doing, but rather to organise an armed unit to take part in the war. They recruited several former members of the army, navy and air force, and appointed Saleh Ahmad (previously of the air force) commander of the unit. The unit operated in Satkania and pursued a twofold short-term aim: to fight against bandits operating in the area, and to rescue non-Muslims in danger of being killed by Pakistani forces. Once they were successful on both fronts, Ashab Uddin and Datta decided to expand the activities of the force by attempting a march from Satkania south to Cox's Bazar via Banshkhali. Ashab Uddin hoped that thousands of peasants would join the unit, which would then be able to seize and hold territory, subjecting members of exploitative classes to popular trials and fomenting a wider revolution. This, however, was not to be. On 22 September 1971, upon reaching Banshkhali, all but two of the members of the unit were killed by Sheikh Mujibur Rahman's supporters (who did not wish independent leftist forces to operate outside their control), while the other two escaped and were soon killed by Pakistani and Al-Badr forces. When Ashab Uddin and Datta arrived in Banshkhali the following day to rendezvous with their unit, they immediately had to flee. Ashab Uddin spent some time hiding on a boat in the middle of a river but, afraid of being caught either by either Pakistani or pro-Mujib forces, he proceeded to Chittagong, where he spent the rest of the war in hiding, growing a beard as a disguise.

=== Politics in the Bangladesh era ===
After the war, the Communist Party led by Toaha, which Ashab Uddin was a member of, was in opposition to Sheikh Mujibur Rahman's government.

In 1979, Ashab Uddin stood for election to the Bangladeshi parliament from Banshkhali. Although he did not wish to take part in the election so long as Ziaur Rahman was in power, he was persuaded to do so by the party leadership. However, he did not win the seat this time.

In 1980, Ashab Uddin, Toaha and another Bangladeshi Communist leader named Dr. Khayr were invited by the Chinese Communist Party (CCP) to visit the country. Before leaving China, the Bangladeshi delegation was hosted for a luncheon by Yang Shangkun, the mayor of Guangzhou. Yang stated during the gathering that "We have established socialism in the country. Now there is no longer a need for class struggle. It is enough to increase production." Ashab Uddin objected that Lenin and Mao had said that class struggle had to continue until full-fledged communism was established. He warned Yang that, with the import of capital from capitalist countries, China may also end up importing CIA plots. After this lunch, Ashab Uddin sent a letter of similar import to the Central Committee of the CCP.

Ashab Uddin quit active politics in 1981, disillusioned by the factionalism of Bangladeshi Communists (there were six or seven pro-CCP parties in Bangladesh, not to mention the pro-Soviet ones), as well as the corruption of some Communist leaders.

When discussing the 1991 election, Ashab Uddin Ahmad expressed the view that parliamentary democracy was unsuitable for Bangladesh, given that most of the population at the time was illiterate, which exposed them to exploitation and communalism. In his view, "Ministers and MPs do not represent the general public in any way. They are only the representatives of money and strength." In his view, Indian democracy had not been able to solve the problems of "poverty, landlessness, homelessness, unemployment, the lack of education, untouchability and communalism." He believed that, looking at India, Bangladeshis should draw the conclusion that, instead of democracy, what was needed was a popular revolution led by a revolutionary party.

== Literary works ==
Ashab Uddin Ahmad's bibliography includes the following published books:

- Poth Cholite (While Walking on the Path) (1942, in Bengali)
- Badoler Dhara Jhore Jhor Jhor (The Rain Keeps Falling) (1949, in Bengali)
- Made Very Easy (1949, in Bengali)
- Dhar (Loan) (1950, in Bengali)
- Jan o Man (Life and Honour) (1950, in Bengali)
- Sher Ek Ana Matro (A Ser for Just an Anna) (1968, in Bengali)
- Bande Votaram (1969, in English)
- Aoyami Liger Mir Jafori Oitijjo (The Awami League's Mir Jafar-Like Heritage) (1970, in Bengali)
- Hater Panch Angul (The Five Fingers of the Hand) (1970, in Bengali)
- Dari Shomachar (Beard News) (1971, in Bengali)
- Lekhok o Pachok (The Writer and the Cook) (1971, in Bengali)
- Bansh Shomachar (Bamboo News) (1974, in Bengali)
- Bhater Bangla Kaporer Bangla (The Bengali for Rice, the Bengali for Clothes) (1974, in Bengali)
- Biplob Bonam Oti Biplob (Revolution vs. Super-Revolution) (1974, in Bengali)
- Lathi Lathi o Gonotontro (Sticks, Kicks and Democracy) (1974, in Bengali)
- Dipod Bonam Chotushpod (Two-Legged vs. Four-Legged) (1975, in Bengali)
- Indira Gandhir Bichar Chai (I Demand that Indira Gandhi Be Put on Trial) (1975, in Bengali)
- Uddhar (Rescue) (1978, in Bengali)
- Amar Shahitto Jibon (My Literary Life) (1980, in Bengali)
- Danger Signal (1980, in Bengali)
- Ghush (Bribes) (1986, in Bengali)
- Ujan Srote Jiboner Bhela (Upstream on Life's Raft) (1990, in Bengali)
- Dam Shashon Desh Shashon (Ruling Prices, Ruling the Country) (1991, in Bengali)
- Bhumihin Krishok Korihin Lekhok (Landless Peasant, Penniless Writer) (1992, in Bengali)
- Ashabuddin Ahmoder Shera Rommo Rochona (Ashab Uddin Ahmad's Best Satire) (1994, in Bengali)

In addition to the above, Ashab Uddin Ahmad also wrote 15 unpublished books in Bengali and English.

== Establishing educational institutions ==
Ashab Uddin Ahmad is the founder of the Banshkhali Degree College, Chittagong City College, the Sadhanpur Rural Improvement High School, the West Banshkhali High School, Satkania College and Ratnapur High School.

== Personal life ==
Ashab Uddin got married the first time after taking his BA examinations in 1936. He had four children with his first wife, of whom the elder two (a son and a daughter) died in childhood, while the younger two (also a son and a daughter) survived into adulthood. Ashab Uddin's second wife died within a year of their marriage.

Ashab Uddin Ahmad died on 28 May 1994 of cardiovascular disease at the Shaheed Suhrawardy Hospital in Dhaka.

== Awards ==
In his lifetime, Ashab Uddin Ahmad received a number of awards from various organisations, including the Bangladesh Freedom Struggle and Liberation War Research Centre, the Chittagong Baisakh Celebration Council, the Lawyer Aid Society, the Chittagong College Alumni Council and the Chittagong Women Writers' Union.

In 2005, Ashab Uddin Ahmad was posthumously honoured with an Ekushey Padak by the government of Bangladesh.
