= Badi Ahmad Chowdhury =

- বদি আহমদ চৌধুরী

Member of the Bengal Legislative Assembly
- In office 1943–1945
- Preceded by: Kshirod Chandra Roy
- Succeeded by: Kumar Arun Chandra Sinha
- Constituency: Chittagong Landholders

Member of the Bengal Legislative Council
- In office 1929–1937
- Preceded by: Khan Sahib Abdus Sattar
- Succeeded by: Nur Ahamed
- Constituency: Chittagong South

Personal details
- Born: 23 March 1886 Bailchhari, Chittagong District, Bengal Presidency
- Died: 13 April 1962 (aged 76) East Pakistan

Khan Bahadur Haji Badi Ahmad Chowdhury CIE (23 March 1886 - 13 April 1962) was a Bengali politician and zamindar. He served as a member of both the Bengal Legislative Council and Bengal Legislative Assembly.

== Early life and family ==
Chowdhury was born on 23 March 1886 at the Bailchhari Wazir Bari (now Khan Bahadur Bari) in Banshkhali, Chittagong District, Bengal Presidency (now in Bangladesh). His father, Mazaharun Nabi Chowdhury, belonged to a Bengali zamindar family of Muslim Viziers. His mother, Tamizunnesa Chowdhury, was a housewife. His ancestor Syed Abdur Rahman Siddiqi is claimed to have migrated from Arabia to Bengal, settling down in Chittagong. Siddiqi's grandson Muhammad Khan served as the Naib-Wazir under Mughal governor Shaista Khan. Chowdhury's great grandfather Muhammad Ahmad Hussain Chowdhury migrated from Mallik Subhan to Bailchhari. Chowdhury's two younger brothers were divisional forest officer Khan Sahib Alhaj Rafiq Ahmed Chowdhury and Qazi Aziz Ahmed Chowdhury.

== Career ==
Badi Ahmed Chowdhury started his career soon after completing his primary education. At the age of 18, he was appointed as the Manager of Muhammad Abdul Bari's Munshi Estate in Anwara. Later, he served as the President of Bailchhari-Katharia Union in Banshkhali for a long 30 years from 1920 to 1950. In June 1929, he contested the Bengal Legislative Council elections for Chittagong South constituency (13 thanas from Rangunia to Teknaf) and won, serving as a member of the Council for eight years. Additionally, on December 15, 1943, he was by-elected as a Member of the Bengal Legislative Assembly (MLA) as a representative of the zamindars of Chittagong, Noakhali, Sylhet, and Tipperah, which formed the divisional Chittagong Landholders constituency. He was awarded the title "Amirul Hajj" in 1935 as the representative of the pilgrims of undivided Bengal, and the title "Khan Bahadur" by the British Raj in 1936. When famine struck Chittagong during World War II he approved 700,000 tons of rice from the legislature through a motion in the Bengal Legislative Assembly and distributed it to Chittagong. He was a member of various industrial, business and other organizations in Bengal and held important positions. He was the Commissioner of Chittagong Municipality, a member of the General Hospital and Medical School, a director of the Deshpriya Sugar Mill, Calcutta and the Indo-Burma Traders Bank.

== Death ==
He died on 13 April 1962 in East Pakistan.
