= Shamsuddin Ahmad Chowdhury =

Bangladeshi politician

Member of Bangladesh Parliament
- In office 1973–1976
- Succeeded by: Mahmudul Karim Chowdhury

Personal details
- Political party: Bangladesh Awami League

Shamsuddin Ahmad Chowdhury (Bengali: শামশুদ্দিন আহমদ চৌধুরী) is a Bangladesh Awami League politician and a former member of parliament for Chittagong-16.

== Career ==
Chowdhury was elected to parliament from Chittagong-16 as a Bangladesh Awami League candidate in 1973.
