= Mujibur Rahman (Chattogram politician) =

Bangladeshi politician

Mujibur Rahaman
- মুজিবুর রহমান
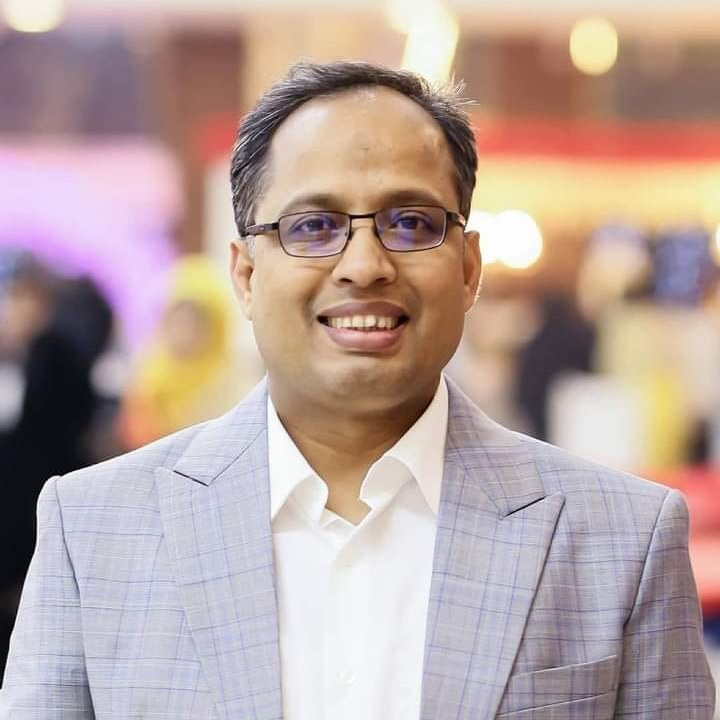

Member of Parliament
- In office 30 January 2024 – 6 August 2024
- Preceded by: Mustafizur Rahman Chowdhury
- Succeeded by: Mohammad Zahirul Islam
- Constituency: Chittagong-16

Personal details
- Born: 20 June 1972 (age 54)
- Party: Independent
- Other political affiliations: Bangladesh Awami League

Mujibur rahman cip (born 20 June 1972) is a Bangladeshi politician. He is a former member of Jatiya Sangsad from Chittagong-16 elected as an independent in the 2024 Bangladeshi general election.
