= Government City College, Chattogram =

Public educational institution in Chittagong, Bangladesh

- সরকারি সিটি কলেজ, চট্টগ্রাম
- Other name: GCCC
- Former name: Chittagong Night College
- Motto: প্রবেশ কর জ্ঞানের সন্ধানে ছড়িয়ে পড়ো দেশের খেদমতে
- Type: Public
- Established: 1954; 72 years ago
- Founders: Ashab Uddin Ahmad, Jonab Ali Ukil
- Affiliations: University of Chittagong; Board of Intermediate and Secondary Education, Chattogram
- Principal: Abu Saleh Mohammad Noim Uddin
- Students: 22000+
- Location: Ice Factory Road (near New Market), Chittagong-4000, Chittagong, Chittagong Division, Bangladesh
- Campus: Urban, 5.194 acres (2.102 ha)
- Language: Bangla & English
- Website: gccc.edu.bd

Government City College, Chattogram (Bengali: সরকারি সিটি কলেজ, চট্টগ্রাম) is a government higher secondary and post graduate educational institution located at Ice Factory Road, Chittagong. It was established in 1954 as Chittagong Night College. It was nationalized in 1979.

== History ==
In 1954, when eminent educationist, former professor of Chittagong College, Ashab Uddin was elected MLA of United Front, Badiul Chalam, the famous industrialist of Chittagong, organized a tea party at his residence in his honor. Many dignitaries were invited to this tea party. In order to improve the education of the backward common people, Ashab Uddin proposed to establish a night college in Chittagong city in front of all present. Everyone agreed to this proposal. In that meeting, a nine-member ad hoc committee was formed to establish the college. The name of the college was fixed as Chittagong Night College. The journey of City College, Chittagong basically starts from here. In 1954, a meeting of the Ad Hoc Committee was held in Chittagong Municipal Auditorium. Mr. Ali dissolved the ad hoc committee in the meeting. A full-fledged college management committee was formed with Ahmad Master as the president and Badsha Mia Chowdhury, a renowned philanthropist, as the secretary. According to the decision of the management committee meeting, the temporary office of Chittagong Night College was opened in Chittagong Municipal High School building in July 1954. Former professor of Chittagong College Babu Yogesh Chandra Sinha was appointed as the principal of the college and the student admission program was started. On August 18, classes were opened at Kazem Ali High School. Due to the increase in the number of students, the authorities shifted the college campus from here to the Victoria Islamia Hostel (now Muslim Education Society) building on 30th June. Day branch was opened in the college on 1st July 1957. As a result, the name of the college has to be changed. read All members of the College Management Committee on 1st July 1962. Unanimously changed the name of the college to City College, Chittagong. In the same year the college campus was shifted from the aforesaid location to the present location.

In 1965, the college opened a graduate course and a science group in the day branch. In the academic year 1970-71, the women's wing of the day wing of the main building of the college was opened. In 1972 the women's wing was shifted to Isgan High School building not far from the college. In the academic year 1972-73 during the tenure of Principal NA, BA and B.Com (Hons) courses in Day Branch and M. in Shaw Branch. And M.com course started. On February 26, 1978, the president announced the nationalization of City College in a joint meeting of students and teachers. Then on 15th August in a meeting of the governing body, a decision was taken to transfer all the movable and immovable assets and overall responsibility of the college to the government. After nationalization the name of the college was changed to Government City College, Chattogram Radha.

== Campus ==
The campus accommodates four multi-storied academic buildings, a Shaheed Minar and a three storied mosque.

== Notable alumni ==
- Shahjahan Chowdhury - Bangladeshi politician and member of parliament
- A. B. M. Mohiuddin Chowdhury - Bangladeshi politician and former mayor of Chittagong
