= M. Siddique =

Bangladeshi politician

Member of Bangladesh Parliament and Constituent Assembly
- In office 1973–1976
- Succeeded by: Mostaq Ahmed Chowdhury

Personal details
- Born: 1928; Satkania, Chittagong
- Died: 4 February 2013 (age 85); Satkania Upazila
- Political party: Bangladesh Awami League

M. Siddique (Bengali: এম সিদ্দিক; 1928 – 4 February 2013) was a Bangladesh Awami League politician and the former member of parliament for Chittagong-14.

== Life and career ==
He was born on 1928 in Chittagong district under Satkania Upazila. On 17 December 1970, he was elected as MPA at Provincial Assembly election from Chittagong-14 (P.E-294) and also he was elected to parliament from Chittagong-14 as a Bangladesh Awami League candidate in 1973. He died on 4 February 2013, at Satkania Upazila of his own residence.
