= Jashim Uddin Ahammed =

Bangladeshi politician

- জসিম উদ্দিন আহমেদ

Member of Parliament
- Incumbent
- Assumed office 17 February 2026
- Preceded by: Md. Nazrul Islam Chowdhury
- Constituency: Chittagong-14

Personal details
- Born: 10 June 1977 (age 49) Chandanaish, Bangladesh
- Party: Bangladesh Nationalist Party
- Occupation: Businessman, politician

Jashim Uddin Ahammed (Bengali: জসিম উদ্দিন আহমেদ) is a businessman and a Bangladesh Nationalist Party politician who is the incumbent member of parliament for Chittagong-14. He previously served as the chairman of Chandanaish Upazila.
