= Mohammad Zahirul Islam =

Bangladeshi politician

Mohammad Zahirul Islam MP
- মোহাম্মদ জহিরুল ইসলাম
- Official portrait, 2025

Member of Parliament
- Incumbent
- Assumed office 17 February 2026
- Preceded by: Mujibur Rahman
- Constituency: Chittagong-16

Upazila Chairman of Banshkhali Upazila
- In office 2014–2018
- Preceded by: Alamgir Kabir Chowdhury
- Succeeded by: Maulana Badrul Haque (acting); Chowdhury Mohammad Galib Sadli

Chairman of Shekherkhil Union Parishad
- In office 2003–2014

Personal details
- Born: Mohammad Zahirul Islam; 12 March 1976 (age 50) Banshkhali, Chittagong, Bangladesh
- Citizenship: Bangladesh
- Party: Bangladesh Jamaat-e-Islami
- Children: 1
- Occupation: Politician; Educator
- Profession: Madrasa principal; Islamic scholar
- Website: Zahirul Islam

Mohammad Zahirul Islam (born 12 March 1976), also known by the honorific Principal Mawlana Mohammad Zahirul Islam, is a Bangladeshi politician, educator, and the Member of Parliament (Jatiya Sangsad) representing the Chittagong-16 constituency. A member of Bangladesh Jamaat-e-Islami, he was elected in the 2026 Bangladeshi general election. He previously served as the Chairman of Banshkhali Upazila Parishad and as a two-term Chairman of Shekherkhil Union Parishad.

== Early life and education ==
Mohammad Zahirul Islam was born on 12 March 1976 in Shekherkhil Union of Banshkhali Upazila in Chittagong District, Bangladesh. His father was Ishaq and his mother was Zohra Begum. He earned a Bachelor of Laws (LL.B. Honours) degree along with religious qualifications in Islamic studies.

== Professional career ==
In 1998, Islam joined the faculty of Hamedia Rahima Fazil Madrasa in Banshkhali as a lecturer. In 2001, he was appointed as the principal of the institution.

== Political career ==
=== Student politics ===
Islam began his political activism during his student years through Bangladesh Islami Chhatra Shibir, an organization that is de jure an independent student body but operates as the de facto student wing of Bangladesh Jamaat-e-Islami. He participated in its organizational activities in Chittagong before transitioning into local government politics.

=== Local government ===
Islam entered local politics at the age of 24, winning election as the Chairman of Shekherkhil Union Parishad, a position he held for two terms.

In March 2014, Islam was elected Chairman of Banshkhali Upazila Parishad. He served as Upazila Chairman until late 2018, when he resigned to contest the parliamentary elections.

=== Parliamentary politics ===
In the 2018 general election, Islam contested the Chittagong-16 seat as an independent candidate, securing 17,160 votes.

In the 2026 Bangladeshi general election, Islam ran as the official candidate of Bangladesh Jamaat-e-Islami for Chittagong-16 and was elected to parliament. He was sworn into office at the Jatiya Sangsad on 17 February 2026.
