= Banshkhali carnage =

Banshkhali carnage was a targeted killing of 11 members of a Hindu family to grab their land in Bangladesh. There has been no verdict in the criminal case filled over the incident. The accused in the case include politicians of Bangladesh Nationalist Party.

== History ==
On 18 November 2003, some individuals set fire to the house of Tejendra Lal Sheel using gunpowder killing 11 members of family including six children. The house was located in Sheelpara, Sadhonpur village, Banshkhali Upazila, Chittagong District, Bangladesh. It is 30 miles from Chittagong, Bangladesh's second largest city. Bangladesh police initially described the case as "just another robbery". The incident outrage across Bangladesh. The family members did not believe it was a simple case of robbery. The accused intimidated Tejendra for while before the arson as they sought to take over his property.

On 10 March 2004, police arrested a number of individuals related to the case. One of the accused, Mahbub, said they followed orders from Mokhtar and shut down the doors and windows of the house while Rubel set fire to it. He said they had been hired by the nephew of a State Minister and a local Union chairman to set the building on fire. Dr Bimal Sheel, Tejendra Lal Sheel's son and survivor of the fire, started legal proceedings over the fire. He has not received support from the government of Bangladesh and has had to bourn the significant legal costs. General Secretary of Bangladesh Hindu Buddhist Christian Unity Council Rana Dasgupta has been a vocal supporter of Sheel and campaigned for a verdict in the case.

Assistant superintendent of police Clarence Gomez did not include Aminur Rahman Chowdhury in the initial charge sheet filed on 14 December 2005 which was challenged by Dr. Bimal Sheel in a Chittagong court. The court ordered additional probes and a new charge sheet was submitted on 27 November 2007 by Assistant superintendent of police Shafiqur Rahman. This charge sheet was also challenged in court by Dr Bimal Sheel. A new charge sheet was created by Assistant superintendent of police Khurshid Jamil of the Criminal Investigation Department (CID), where the case was transferred from Bangladesh Police.

Assistant superintendent of police Hla Ching Pru filed a case in January 2011 charging 38 individuals with arson, looting, and murder. The prosecutor added the charge of murder with motive to grab property. 17 of the accused are on bail and 19 are currently fugitives.

In May 2012, court proceedings in the Banshakhali carnage case began. It was momentarily transferred to the Speedy Trial Tribunal but returned to the regular court after failing to get a verdict within the stipulated time. On 6 June 2012, accused Aminul Haq alias Amin Chairman was arrested by Bangladesh Police from Banshkhali upazila. One of the accused, Aminur Rahman Chowdhury, is a politician of Bangladesh Nationalist Party, then the party in power, and president of its Kalipur union unit. Aminur Rahman Chowdhury's cousin, Jafrul Islam Chowdhury, was a member of parliament and the state minister for environment and forest. On 24 February 2014, Nirmal Shil, a prosecution witnesses testified in court that the arson was preplanned as part of an attempt to grab the victim's property.

As of November 2021, the trial in the case has not been completed. Rana Dasgupta, general secretary of the Hindu Buddhist Christian Unity Council, described the delay as part of the impunity that surrounds cases on attacks on religious minorities.
