= Sultanul Kabir Chowdhury =

Bangladeshi freedom fighter, lawyer and politician

Member of Parliament for Chittagong-15
- In office 5 March 1991 – 24 November 1995
- Preceded by: Mahmudul Islam Chowdhury
- Succeeded by: Jafrul Islam Chowdhury

Personal details
- Born: c. 1946
- Died: 30 June 2014 (aged 68)
- Political party: Bangladesh Awami League

Sultanul Kabir Chowdhury (c. 1946 – 30 June 2014) was a Bangladeshi freedom fighter, lawyer and politician from Chittagong belonging to Bangladesh Awami League. He was a member of the Jatiya Sangsad.

== Biography ==
Chowdhury was elected as the general secretary of Government City College, Chittagong in 1969. He took part in the mass uprising in 1969. He also took part in the Liberation War of Bangladesh in 1971.

Chowdhury was appointed as the president of Chittagong City Jubo League in 1972. He was arrested after the assassination of Sheikh Mujibur Rahman. He was released after six months.

Chowdhury was elected as a member of the Jatiya Sangsad from Chittagong-15 in 1991. He served as the acting president of Jubo League in 1999. He also served as the senior vice president of the Chittagong South District unit of Awami League.

Chowdhury died of heart disease on 30 June 2014 at the age of 68.
