= Abdul Motaleb (politician) =

Bangladeshi politician

- আব্দুল মোতালেব

Member of the Bangladesh Parliament for Chittagong-15
- In office 30 January 2024 – 6 August 2024
- Preceded by: Abu Reza Muhammad Nezamuddin
- Succeeded by: Shajahan Chowdhury

Personal details
- Born: 2 April 1953 (age 73)
- Party: Independent
- Other political affiliations: Bangladesh Awami League

Abdul Motaleb (born 2 April 1953) is a Bangladeshi politician and former member of parliament for Chittagong-15.

== Career ==
Motaleb was elected member of Jatiya Sangsad from Chittagong-15 as an independent candidate on the 2024 Bangladeshi general election. He received 85,628 votes while his nearest rival, Abu Reza Muhammad Nezamuddin Nadvi of the Awami League, received 39,252 votes. Previously he served as the Upazila Chairman of Satkania Upazila. Currently, he is serving as the president of Satkania Upazila Awami League.

After the fall of the Sheikh Hasina led Awami League government, a mob led by convener of the Pallabi unit of the Students Against Discrimination Shekh Tarek Jamil Taj broke into his house in Mohakhali DOHS. The misbehaved with the Mirpur DOHS Parishad leaders and ignored police orders to leave the house. This happened soon after two leaders of Bangladesh Jamaat-e-Islami were killed in mob lynching in Satkania where they had been looting businesses owned by Awami League leaders. The Bangladesh Jamaat-e-Islami leaders were armed with weapons looted from police stations during the movement against Hasina.
