= Natmura Pukuria High School =

- নাটমুড়া পুকুরিয়া উচ্চ বিদ্যালয়

Location
- Banshkhali Upazila Chittagong; Bangladesh
- Coordinates: 22.1601°N 91.9290°E

Information
- Type: Secondary School
- Motto: জ্ঞানই আলো (Knowledge is light)
- Established: 1957
- Founder: Mahbub Alam Anwar
- School board: Chittagong
- School district: Chittagong
- Session: January–December
- School code: 104064 (EIIN)
- Chairman: Rahbar Alam Anwar
- Acting headteacher: Mohammad Younus
- Teaching staff: 22
- Grades: 6-10
- Gender: Male and female
- Age range: 11-18
- Enrollment: 1600
- Language: Bangla
- Campus size: 1.91 Acre
- Campus type: Rural
- Color
- Sports: Football, handball, volleyball, kabaddi
- Nickname: NPHS
- Website: www.natmuraphs.edu.bd

Natmura Pukuria High School (NPHS) is a secondary school in the northern part of Banshkhali Upazila in Chittagong, Bangladesh.

== History ==
Natmura Pukaria High School was founded by Mahbub Alam Anwar in 1957. The first class, year 6, had twenty-four students. The following year the school added a class of year eight students. Eight years after the first class, Natmura Pukuria was able to add a class of year nine students. In 1967, the first Secondary School Certificate (SSC) batch of students took the public exam.

== Campus ==
The campus is located in Pukuria village, where Banshkhali Upazila crosses Sangu river. It is about 25 km from Chittagong city. The school campus covers about 1.9 acres. It operates in two enclosed buildings and a tin shed building.

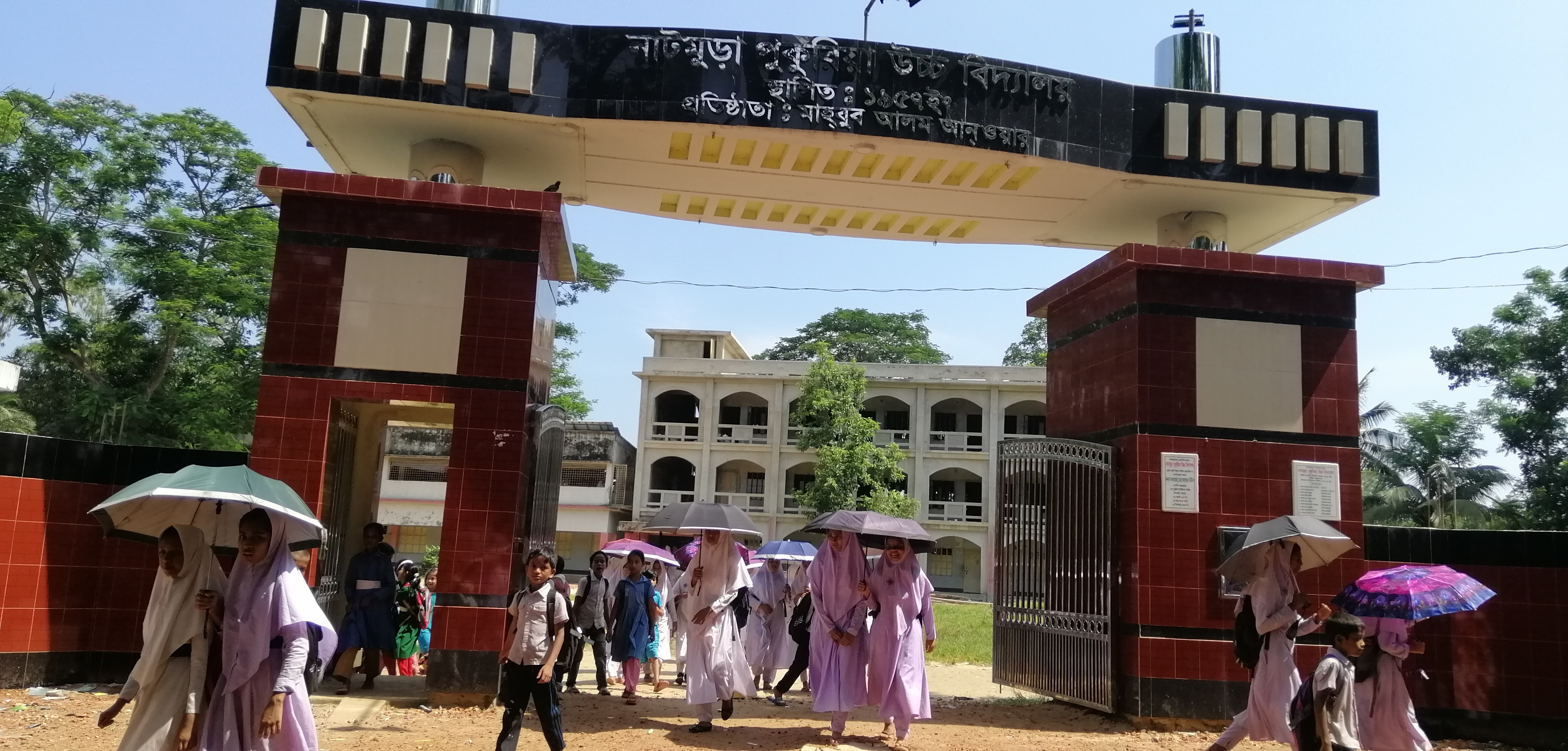
Entrance of Natmura Pukuria High School

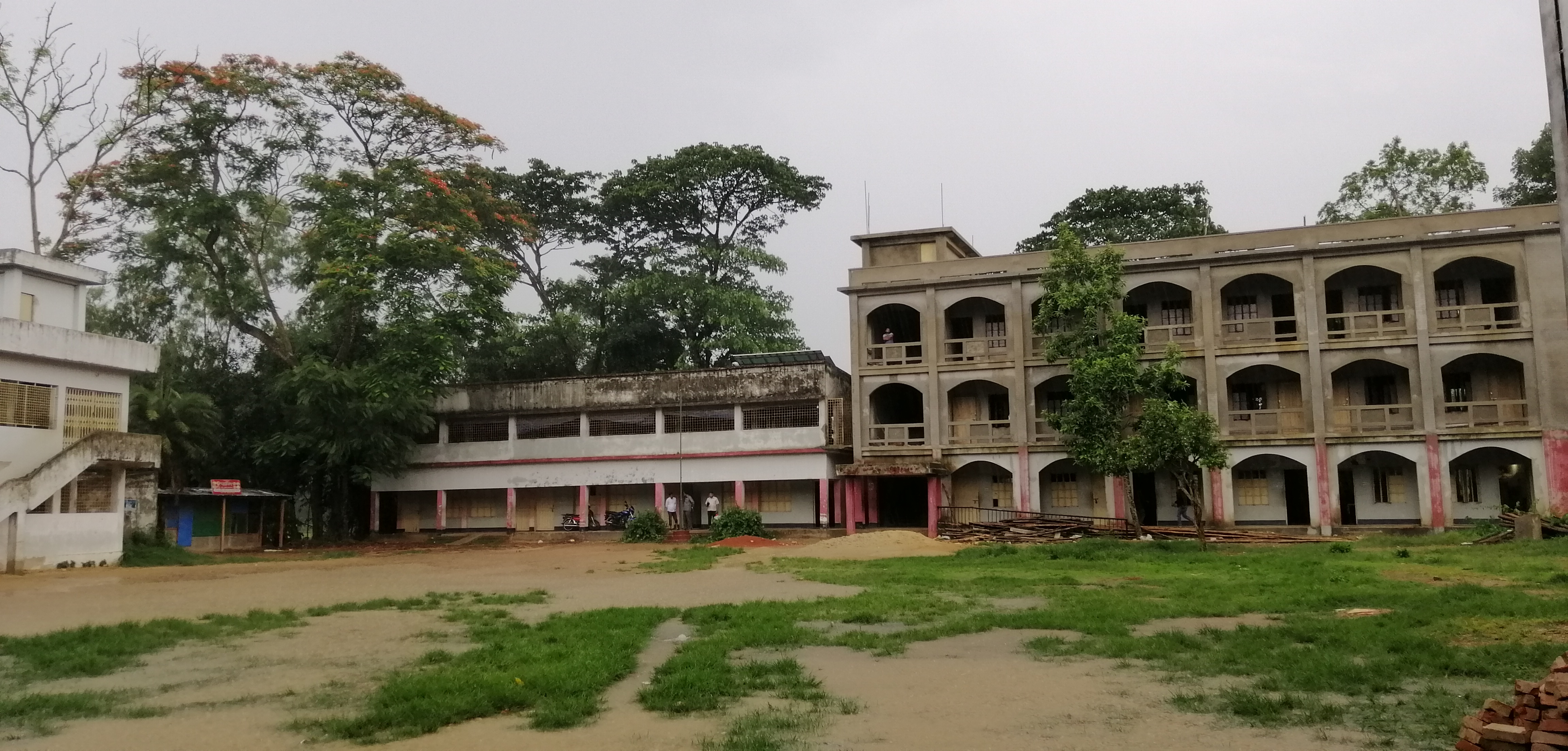
Main building with its playground

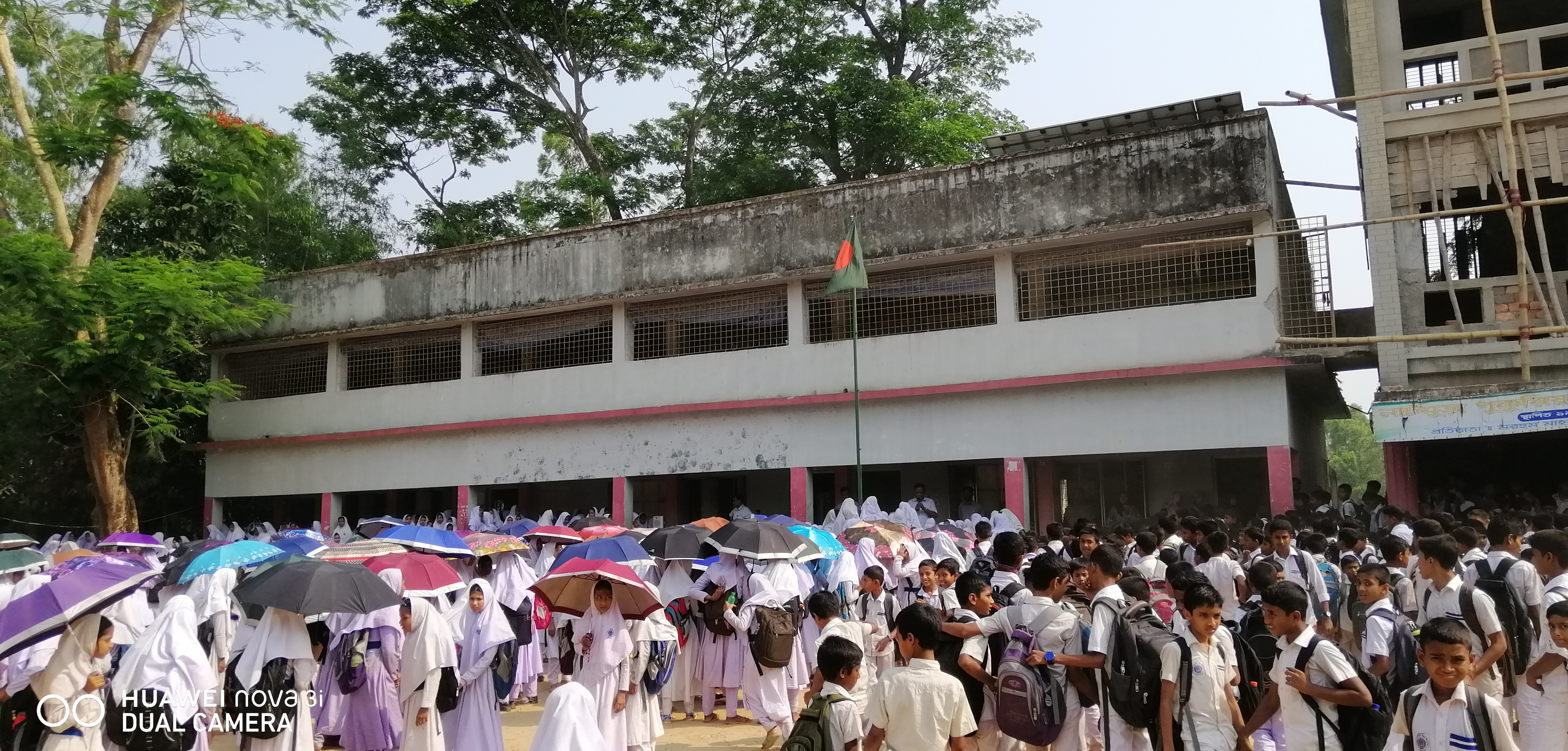
All the student gathered to join a meeting

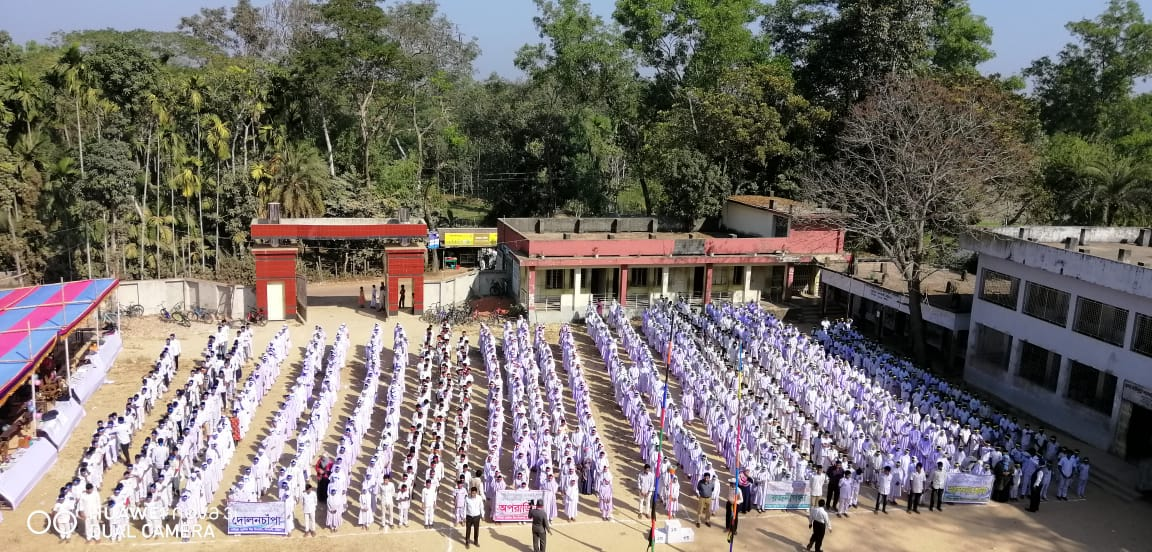
School Students from Classes 6 to 10 lined up for Assembly

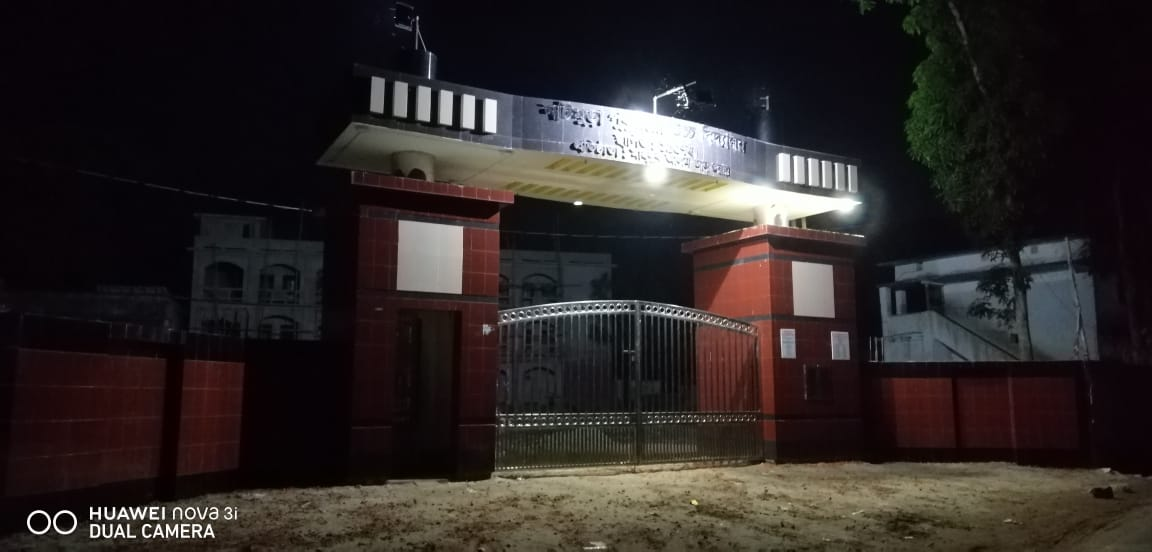
Night View of Natmura Pukuria High School Main Entrance Gate

== Facilities ==
=== Multimedia classes ===
The government of Bangladesh introduced 'multimedia classrooms' and 'teacher-led content development' in 15,200 secondary schools through projects of Ministry of Education and Ministry of Primary and Mass Education across the country. A minimum of two daily multimedia classes are held.

=== Digital classes ===
In 2018, the school launched digital classes using tablets.

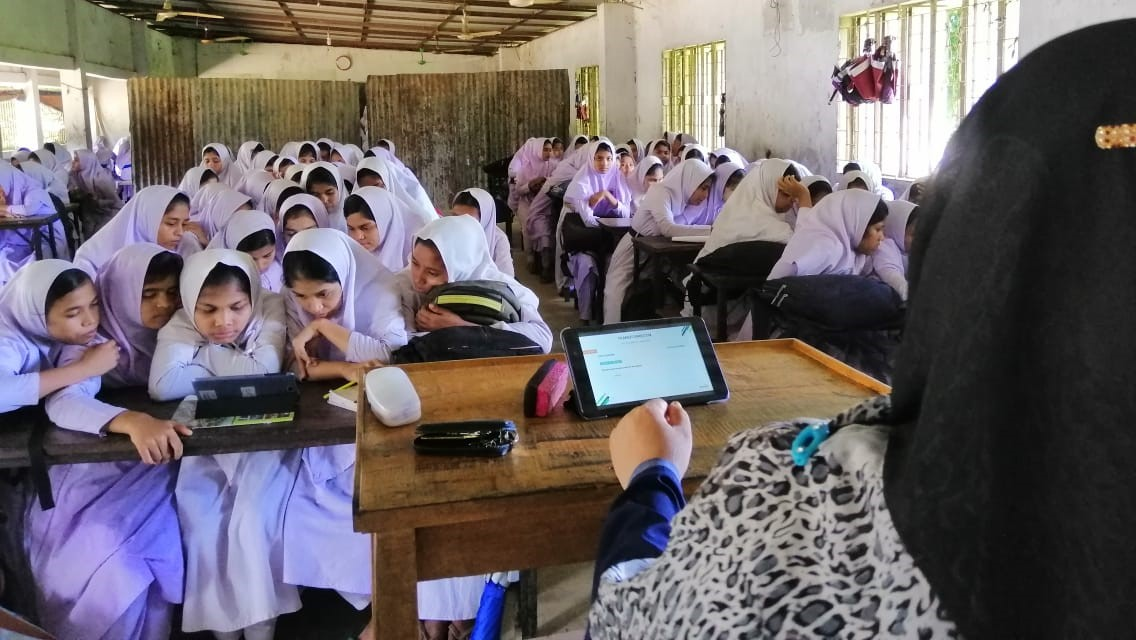
For Classes 8 and 9, teachers impart lessons through tabs for English and Mathematics

== Management ==
The school has a management system under the rules of Intermediate and Secondary Education Boards, Bangladesh. Rahbar Alam Anwar is the present chairman of the School Managing Committee.

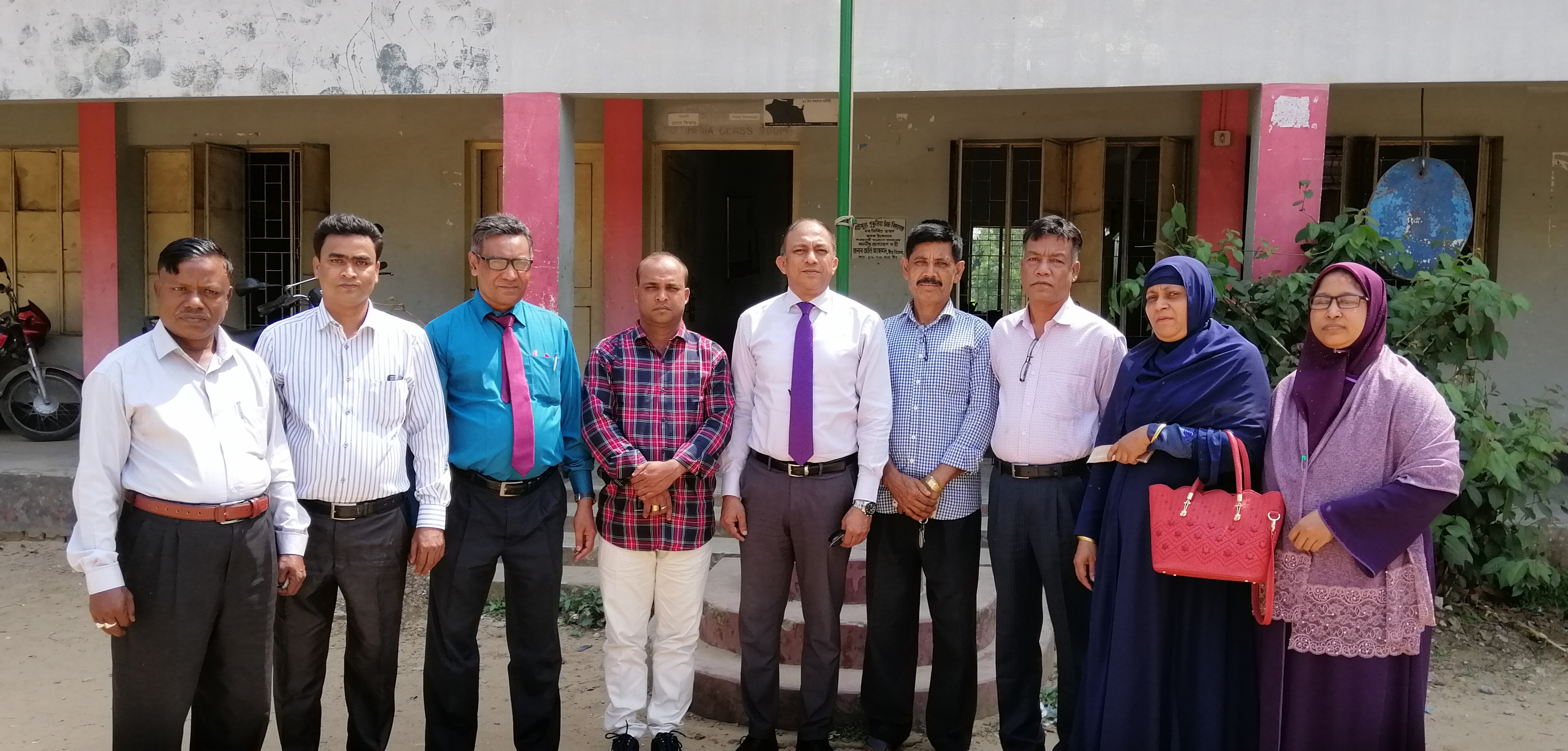
Current management panel of the school
