= Ibrahim Bin Khalil =

Bangladeshi politician

Member of Bangladesh Parliament
- In office 1986–1988
- Preceded by: Mostaq Ahmed Chowdhury
- Succeeded by: Ibrahim Bin Khalil
- In office 1988–1991
- Preceded by: Ibrahim Bin Khalil
- Succeeded by: Shajahan Chowdhury

Personal details
- Born: Satkania, Chittagong,
- Died: 2004
- Political party: Jatiya Party

Ibrahim Bin Khalil (Bengali: ইব্রাহিম বিন খলিল) is a Bangladeshi Jatiya Party politician and a former member of parliament for Chittagong-14.

== Career ==
Khalil was elected to parliament from Chittagong-14 as a Bangladesh Awami League candidate in 1986 and 1988. He was a member of the Chittagong Division Sub-Committee.
