= Chittagong-15 =

Constituency of Bangladesh's Jatiya Sangsad

Coordinates: 22.02°N 92.10°E

- Constituency for the Jatiya Sangsad
- District: Chittagong District
- Division: Chittagong Division
- Electorate: 506,059 (2026)

Current constituency
- Created: 1973
- Party: Bangladesh Jamaat-e-Islami
- Member: Shajahan Chowdhury
- ← 291 Chittagong-14 293 Chittagong-16 →

Chittagong-15 is a constituency represented in the Jatiya Sangsad (National Parliament) of Bangladesh since 2026 by Shajahan Chowdhury of the Bangladesh Jamaat-e-Islami.

== Boundaries ==
The constituency encompasses Lohagara Upazila and all but six union parishads of Satkania Upazila: Bazlia, Dharmapur, Kalais, Keochia, Khagaria, and Puranagar.

== History ==
The constituency was created for the first general elections in newly independent Bangladesh, held in 1973.

Ahead of the 2014 general election, the Election Commission renumbered the seat for Sandwip Upazila from Chittagong-16 to Chittagong-3, bumping up by one the suffix of the former constituency of that name and the higher numbered constituencies in the district. Thus Chittagong-15 covers the area previously covered by Chittagong-14. Previously Chittagong-15 encompassed Banshkhali Upazila.

== Members of Parliament ==
Election	Member	Party
1973	Shah-e-Jahan Chowdhury	Awami League
1979	Mahmudul Islam Chowdhury	Bangladesh Nationalist Party
1986	Mahmudul Islam Chowdhury	Jatiya Party
1991	Sultanul Kabir Chowdhury	Awami League
Feb 1996	Jafrul Islam Chowdhury	Bangladesh Nationalist Party
Jun 1996	Jafrul Islam Chowdhury	Bangladesh Nationalist Party
Major Boundary Changes
2014	Abu Reza Muhammad Nezamuddin	Awami League
2024	Abdul Motaleb	Independent
2026	Shajahan Chowdhury	Bangladesh Jamaat-e-Islami

== Elections ==
=== Elections in the 2020s ===
General Election 2026: Chittagong-10
Party	Candidate	Votes	%	±%
Jamaat	Shajahan Chowdhury	181,238	57.6	N/A
BNP	Nazmul Mustafa Amin	130,661	41.5	N/A
IAB	Shariful Alam Chowdhury	2,909	0.9	N/A
Majority		50,577	16.1	N/A
Turnout		314,808	62.2	N/A
Jamaat gain from Independent				

=== Elections in the 2010s ===
General Election 2014: Chittagong-15
Party	Candidate	Votes	%	±%
AL	Abu Reza Mohammad Nejamuddin	101,866	95.8	+48.3
BNF	Joynal Abedin Quaderi	4,448	4.2	N/A
Majority		97,418	91.6	+87.4
Turnout		106,314	31.6	−54.1
AL gain from BNP				

=== Elections in the 2000s ===
General Election 2008: Chittagong-15
Party	Candidate	Votes	%	±%
BNP	Jafrul Islam Chowdhury	99,896	51.7	−10.8
AL	Sultanul Kabir Chowdhary	91,870	47.5	+12.6
BIF	Mohammed Azizur Rahman Aziz	1,133	0.6	N/A
Gano Forum	Ranjit Kumar Sikdar	415	0.2	N/A
Majority		8,026	4.2	−23.4
Turnout		193,314	85.7	+13.0
BNP hold				

General Election 2001: Chittagong-15
Party	Candidate	Votes	%	±%
BNP	Jafrul Islam Chowdhury	100,856	62.5	+24.5
AL	Sultanul Kabir Chowdhury	56,314	34.9	+6.4
IJOF	Aminur Rashid Chowdhury	3,516	2.2	N/A
Liberal Party Bangladesh	Mohiuddin Hiru	357	0.2	N/A
Independent	Saifuddin Ahmed	213	0.1	N/A
Bangladesh Progressive Party	Syed Mujibar Rahman Quayes	66	0.0	N/A
Majority		44,542	27.6	+18.1
Turnout		161,322	72.7	+5.0
BNP hold				

=== Elections in the 1990s ===
General Election June 1996: Chittagong-15
Party	Candidate	Votes	%	±%
BNP	Jafrul Islam Chowdhury	45,392	38.0	+27.9
AL	Sultanul Kabir Chowdhury	34,076	28.5	−3.7
JP(E)	Mahmudul Islam Chowdhury	18,624	15.6	N/A
Jamaat	Muminul Haque Chowdhury	18,070	15.1	N/A
IOJ	Izharul Islam Chowdhury	2,048	1.7	N/A
BIF	Abdur Rahman	848	0.7	N/A
Zaker Party	Nurul Haque	517	0.4	N/A
Majority		11,316	9.5	+8.8
Turnout		119,575	67.7	+19.3
BNP gain from AL				

General Election 1991: Chittagong-15
Party	Candidate	Votes	%	±%
AL	Sultanul Kabir Chowdhury	29,704	32.2	
Independent	Mahmudul Islam Chowdhury	29,078	31.5	
Jamaat	Mominul Haq	21,271	23.0	
BNP	Abu Saleh Chowdhury	9,308	10.1	
Bangladesh Janata Party	Kamal Uddin	1,295	1.4	
Jatiya Samajtantrik Dal-JSD	Mokhter Ahmed	1,072	1.2	
Bangladesh Muslim League (Kader)	Mujubur Rahman	303	0.3	
BAKSAL	Kh. Md. Somi Uddin	288	0.3	
Majority		626	0.7	
Turnout		92,319	48.4	
AL gain from JP(E)				
