= Shajahan Chowdhury (Chittagong politician) =

Bangladeshi politician

- শাহজাহান চৌধুরী

Member of Parliament
- Incumbent
- Assumed office 17 February 2026
- Preceded by: Abdul Motaleb
- Constituency: Chittagong-15
- In office 1 October 2001 – 29 October 2006
- Preceded by: Oli Ahmad
- Succeeded by: Oli Ahmad
- Constituency: Chittagong-14
- In office 20 March 1991 – 30 March 1996
- Preceded by: Ibrahim Bin Khalil
- Succeeded by: Oli Ahmad
- Constituency: Chittagong-14

Personal details
- Born: April 7, 1956 (age 70) Satkania, Chittagong, East Pakistan
- Party: Bangladesh Jamaat-e-Islami
- Spouse: Zohra Begum
- Occupation: Politician

Shajahan Chowdhury (Bengali: শাহজাহান চৌধুরী) is a Bangladeshi politician. He is currently now the Member of Parliament representing the Chittagong-15 constituency. He previously served as the Ameer of the Chittagong Metropolitan unit and is currently a member of the Central Working Committee of Bangladesh Jamaat-e-Islami.

== Early life and education ==
Shajahan Chowdhury was born in Satkania, Chittagong, Bangladesh. He completed his early education in the Chittagong region and later pursued higher education from a recognized institution.

== Career ==
Chowdhury was elected to parliament from Chittagong-14 as a Bangladesh Jamaat-e-Islami candidate in 1991 and 2001.

Chowdhury was arrested on 1 May 2019. According to the local police, there had been 50 violence cases against him.

== See also ==
- Politics of Bangladesh
