= Chittagong-16 =

Constituency of Bangladesh's Jatiya Sangsad

Coordinates: 22.03°N 91.95°E

- Constituency for the Jatiya Sangsad
- District: Chittagong District
- Division: Chittagong Division
- Electorate: 411,274 (2026)

Current constituency
- Created: 2008
- Party: Bangladesh Jamaat-e-Islami
- Member: Mohammad Zahirul Islam
- ← 292 Chittagong-15 294 Cox's Bazar-1 →

Chattogram-16 is a constituency represented in the Jatiya Sangsad (National Parliament) of Bangladesh since 2026 by Mohammad Zahirul Islam of the Bangladesh Jamaat-e-Islami.

== Boundaries ==
The constituency encompasses Banshkhali Upazila.

== History ==
The constituency was created when, ahead of the 2008 general election, the Election Commission redrew constituency boundaries to reflect population changes revealed by the 2001 Bangladesh census. The 2008 redistricting added a new seat to Chattogram District, increasing the number of constituencies in the district to 16. The seat for Sandwip Upazila was renumbered from Chittagong-3 to Chittagong-16, and seats 2 through 7 were shuffled around so that the three metropolitan seats (Chittagong-8, 9, and 10) could be split into four (Chittagong-7, 8, 9, and 10).

Ahead of the 2014 general election, the Election Commission renumbered the seat for Sandwip Upazila from Chattogram-16 back to Chittagong-3, bumping up by one the suffix of the former constituency of that name and the higher numbered constituencies in the district. Thus Chattogram-16 covers the area covered in 2008 by Chittagong-15.

== Members of Parliament ==
Election	Member	Party
1973	Shamsuddin Ahmad Chowdhury	Awami League
1979	Mahmudul Karim Chowdhury	Bangladesh Nationalist Party
Major Boundary Changes
2008	Mostafa Kamal Pasha	Bangladesh Nationalist Party
2014	Mustafizur Rahman Chowdhury	Awami League
2018	Mustafizur Rahman Chowdhury	Awami League
2024	Mujibur Rahman	Independent
2026	Mohammad Zahirul Islam	Bangladesh Jamaat-e-Islami

== Elections ==
=== Elections in the 2020s ===
General Election 2026: Chittagong-10
Party	Candidate	Votes	%	±%
Jamaat	Mohammad Zahirul Islam	93,167	39.3	N/A
BNP	Mishkatul Islam Chowdhury	83,105	35.1	N/A
Independent	Mohammad Leaquat Ali	55,492	23.4	N/A
IAB	Hafez Ruhullah	4,054	1.7	N/A
Islamic Front	Abdul Malek	844	0.4	N/A
GOP	Md. Ariful Haque	243	0.4	N/A
BML	Ehsanul Haq	105	0.0	N/A
Majority		10,062	4.2	N/A
Turnout		237,010	57.6	N/A
Registered electors		411,274		
Jamaat gain from Independent				

=== Elections in the 2010s ===
General Election 2014: Chittagong-16
Party	Candidate	Votes	%	±%
AL	Mustafizur Rahman Chowdhury	147,855	95.6	+78.3
Jatiya Party (M)	AAM Haider Ali Chowdhury	6,848	4.4	N/A
Majority		141,007	91.1	+66.4
Turnout		154,703	57.6	−18.7
AL gain from BNP				

=== Elections in the 2000s ===
General Election 2008: Chittagong-16
Party	Candidate	Votes	%	±%
BNP	Mostafa Kamal Pasha	62,397	53.4	N/A
Independent	Mahfuzur Rahman	33,544	28.7	N/A
AL	Jamal Uddin Chowdhury	20,245	17.3	N/A
IAB	Didarul Maola	565	0.5	N/A
Majority		28,853	24.7	N/A
Turnout		116,751	76.3	N/A
BNP win (new seat)				
