= Mahmudul Karim Chowdhury =

Bangladeshi politician

Member of Bangladesh Parliament
- In office 1979–1986
- Preceded by: Shamsuddin Ahmad Chowdhury
- Succeeded by: Mostafa Kamal Pasha

Personal details
- Political party: Bangladesh Nationalist Party

Mahmudul Karim Chowdhury was a Bangladesh Nationalist Party politician and a member of parliament for Chittagong-16.

== Career ==
Chowdhury was elected to parliament from Mymensingh-11 as a Bangladesh Nationalist Party candidate in 1979.

== Death ==
Chowdhury died on 27 December 2012.
