= Sheikh Zayed Bin Sultan al Nahyan Trust Bangladesh =

- Formation: 1987
- Headquarters: Dhaka, Bangladesh
- Region served: Bangladesh
- Official language: Bengali
- Website: alnahyantrust.gov.bd

Sheikh Zayed Bin Sultan al Nahyan Trust Bangladesh (Bengali: শেখ জায়েদ বিন সুলতান আল নাহিয়ান ট্রাস্ট বাংলাদেশ) is a Bangladesh government managed trust that is responsible for managing a number of orphanages in Bangladesh. It is under the Ministry of Social Welfare. The chairperson of the trust is Nuruzzaman Ahmed, Minister of Social Welfare.

== History ==
In May 1984, Zayed bin Sultan Al Nahyan, President of the United Arab Emirates and Emir of Abu Dhabi, visited Bangladesh. During his visited, he expressed a desire to establish orphanages. He founded the Sheikh Zayed Bin Sultan al Nahyan Trust Bangladesh in 1987 to run orphanages in Bangladesh. The trust manages two orphanages, one in Lalmonirhat District, built in 1993, and another in Mirpur, Dhaka, built in 1987. The trust is funded by income generated from Bangladesh UAE Moitry Complex.

The Trust started with an initial funding of US$50 thousand from the United Arab Emirates. The Trust, beside the moitry shopping complex in Banani, built a number of residential buildings with the aim to use rent from those buildings to fund the orphanages. In 2006, the trust established Mirpur High School. The trust has subsidized the High School with 20 million taka by 2018. In 2020, an investigation by the Parliamentary Standing Committee on Social Welfare discovered graft and mismanagement in the running of the trust. The committee recommended the appointed of an external auditor.

On 6 March 2019, three girls at the orphanage in Lalmonirhat District, managed by Sheikh Zayed Bin Sultan al Nahyan Trust Bangladesh, attempted to commit suicide by consuming a toilet cleaning product.
