= Banshkhali Upazila =

Upazila in Chittagong Division, Bangladesh

Banskhali বাঁশখালী
- Upazila
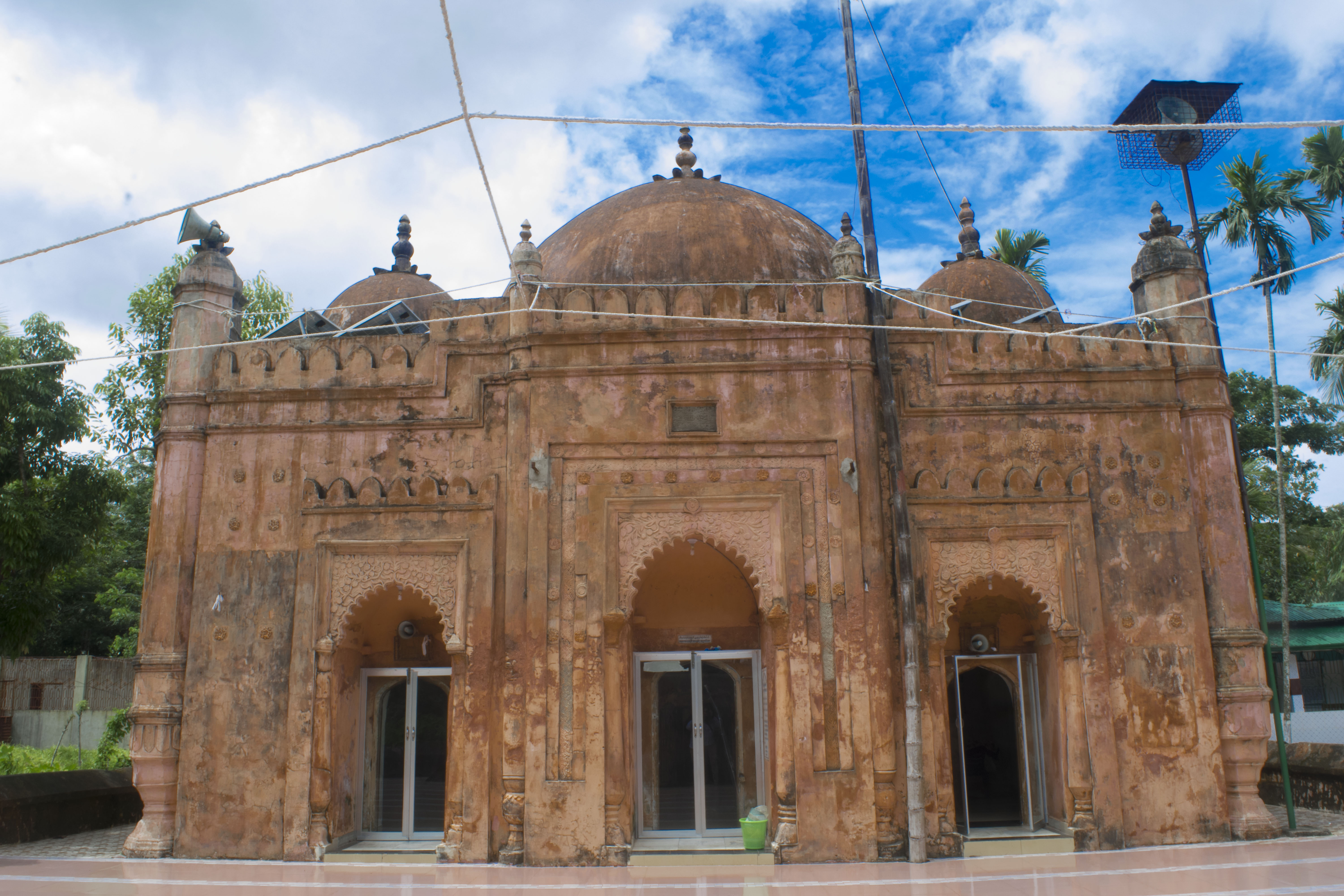
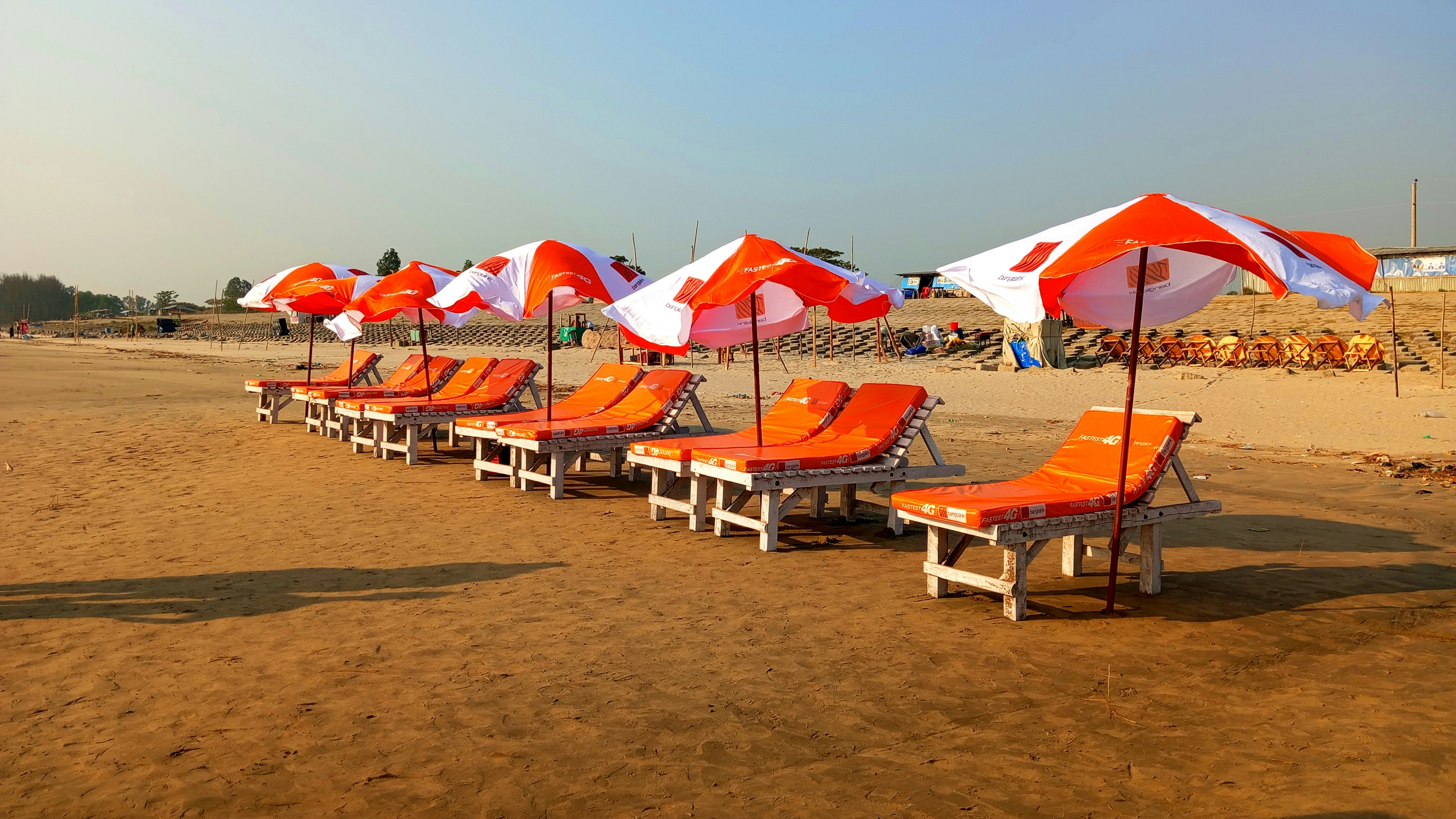
- Landmarks and coastal scenery of Banshkhali Upazila

- Coordinates: 22°1.5′N 91°57.3′E
- Country: Bangladesh
- Division: Chittagong
- District: Chittagong
- Jatiya Sangsad constituency: Chittagong-16
- Headquarters: Banshkhali Upazila Complex

Government
  - Body: Upazila Council
  - MP: Mohammad Zahirul Islam
  - Chairman: Vacant
  - Chief Executive Officer: Rehena Akhtar Kazmi

Area
  - Total: 376.90 km^{2} (145.52 sq mi)

Population (2022)
  - Total: 537,593
  - Density: 850/km^{2} (2,200/sq mi)
- Time zone: UTC+6 (BST)
- Postal code: 4390
- Area code: 03020
- Website: banskhali.chittagong.gov.bd

Banshkhali Upazila mauza geocode map

Banshkhali (Bengali: বাঁশখালী) is a coastal upazila of Bangladesh, located in the Chittagong District along the Bay of Bengal. It is the 5th largest upazila in the Chittagong District and the largest in southern Chittagong. This upazila boasts the second-largest sea beach in Bangladesh, after Cox's Bazar, known as Banshkhali Sea Beach. The longest hanging bridge in Bangladesh is also located in this upazila.

== History ==
Banshkhali's recorded history traces back to the 16th century when it was part of Chakaria under the rule of Khodabakhsh Khan during the Sultanate of Bengal. Following the decline of the Bengal Sultanate, the region came under the control of the Arakanese kingdom (Rakhine), which exerted authority over coastal Chittagong for several decades.

In 1666, the Mughal subahdar Shaista Khan launched a successful military campaign to drive out the Arakanese, bringing Banshkhali and the rest of southeastern Bengal under Mughal control. The area remained under Mughal influence until the advent of British colonial rule, during which Banshkhali was incorporated into the Chittagong district and designated as one of nine revenue chaklas in 1772.

The British period saw administrative restructuring, but the region remained largely agrarian. In 1958, during the Pakistan era, Banshkhali was established as a Thana, and after Bangladesh's independence in 1971, it was upgraded to an Upazila in 1983.

In more recent times, Banshkhali has experienced political and social unrest, including the 2016 protests over land acquisition for a coal-fired power plant that led to deadly clashes, as well as the Banshkhali carnage.

== Geography ==
Banshkhali Upazila is located at 22.0485°N 91.9416°E in Bangladesh. Its neighbouring upazilas are Anwara Upazila to the north, Chakaria and Pekua upazilas of Cox's Bazar District to the south, Lohagara and Satkania upazilas to the east, and Kutubdia Upazila and the Bay of Bengal to the west. Through it runs a canal named "Shonaichari at Banshkhali" which is locally known as "Honaichari". In the past, businessmen from Chakaria bought bamboo here and used the Shonaichari Canal to transport the bamboo to other areas. At that time, local people observed that the Shonaichari Canal was filled with bamboo. Banshkhali is named after this historical event. It has 84,216 households and a total area of 376.9 km^{2}.

== Demographics ==
Religions in Banshkhali Upazila (2022)
Religion	Percent
Islam	90.97%
Hinduism	8.23%
Buddhism	0.77%
Other or not stated	0.03%

According to the 2022 Bangladeshi census, Banshkhali Upazila had 111,743 households and a population of 537,593. 11.45% of the population were under 5 years of age. Banshkhali had a literacy rate (age 7 and over) of 71.32%: 72.67% for males and 69.99% for females, and a sex ratio of 99.94 males for every 100 females. 89,668 (16.68%) lived in urban areas.

As of the 2011 Census of Bangladesh, Bashkhali upazila had 84,216 households and a population of 431,162. 128,881 (29.89%) were under 10 years of age. Banshkhali had an average literacy rate of 37.40%, compared to the national average of 51.8%, and a sex ratio of 1034 females per 1000 males. 36,910 (8.56%) of the population lived in urban areas.

In 2001, among the population, 87% are Muslim, 11% are Hindu, and 1% are Buddhist and other.

== Places of interest ==
- Chandpur-Boilgaon Tea Estate
- Banshkhali Eco Park
- Sangu River
- Bokshi Hamid Mosque
- Khan Bahadur Jame Masjid
- Shafor Alli Munsi Bridge
- Banskhali Sea Beach
  (Baharchhara Point, Khankhanabadh Point, Kadamrasul Point)

== Administration ==
Banshkhali Upazila is divided into Banshkhali Municipality and 14 union parishads. Banshkhali Municipality is subdivided into 9 wards and 38 mahallas.

Unions
No.	Union Name
1	1 No. Pukuria union
2	2 No. Sadhanpur union
3	3 No. Khankhanabad union
4	4 No. Baharchhara union
5	5 No. Kalipur union
6	6 No. Bailchhari union
7	6(A) No. Katharia union
8	7 No. Saral union
9	8 No. Gandamara union
10	9(A) No. Silkup union
11	10 No. Chambal union
12	11 No. Puichhari union
13	12 No. Chhanua union
14	12(A) No. Sekherkhil union

== Education ==
There are 412 primary schools, 39 high schools, 66 madrassas, and 8 colleges.

=== Secondary schools ===
- Chhanua Kaderia High School (1947), Chhanua
- Kalipur Ezharul Haque High School (1942), Kalipur
- Saral Amiria High School (1967), Saral
- Bailchari Nazmunessa High School (1952), KB Bazar, Bailchari
- Kokdandi Gunagari High School, Kokdandi
- West Banshkali High School & College (1957), Chapachari
- Kamal Uddin Chy Girls High School (2005), Chapachari
- Natmura Pukuria High School, Pukuria
- Banskhali Pilot High School, Joldi
- Katharia Bagmara High School, Katharia
- Banigram Sadhonpur High School (1917), Banigram
- Khankhanabadh Ideal High School, Khankhanabadh
- Monaem Shah Awlia High School, South Borumchara
- Hazigoan Borumchara High School (1966), Hazigoan
- Joldi Piolot High School (1932), Joldi
- Sadhonpur Girl's High School
- B B Chowdhary High School (1975), Raichata
- Sadhanpur Polly Unniyon High School, West Sadhanpur
- Baharchara Ratnapur High School (1985)
- Napora Shekherkhil High School (1964)
- Puichari Izzatia Ideal High School
- Chambal High School (1946), Chambal
- Banskhali Bangabandhu High School
- Raichatta Premasia Adhorsho High School
- Gondamara Baraghona High School (1971), Baraghona

=== Colleges ===
- Banshkhli Degree College (1967), Gunagori
- Paschim Banskhali Upokuliyo Degree College (1995), Chapachari
- West Banskhali High School & College (2021) Chapachari
- Alawl Degree College (1973), Joldi
- Mtr. N. Ahd. College, Napora
- Banshkhli Mohila College, Boilchari
- Banshkhali Public School & College, Jaldi Miar Baza
- Hazigoan Borumchara School & College (only intermediate)
- Banskhali Polytechnic Institute (Technical), Boilchhari

=== Madrasas ===
- Banskhali Hamedia Rahima Alia Madrasa (1974), Chechuria
- Chapachari Abu Bakkar (R) Islamia Madrasa. Middle Chaparani
- Chandpur Q.H.R.D.U. Alim Madrasah (1963), Pukuria Union
- South Sadhanpur Jumhuriya Islamia Boys & Girl Madrasah (1970) West Banskhali Darul Islah Dakhil Madrasah (1992)

jaldhi hosainia kamil madrasah (1947)

- Palegram Hakim Miya Shah Senior Madrasha
- Gondamara Rahmania Fazil (Degree) Madrasa, Gondamara
- Puichhari Islamia Kamil Madrasa, Puichhari

== Notable residents ==
- Ashab Uddin Ahmad - educator, writer, politician, Ekushey Padak awardee
- Badi Ahmad Chowdhury (1886–1962), landlord and politician
- Mokhtar Ahmad, freedom fighter and member of parliament, was born in Sadhanpur Union in 1943.
- Abdul Karim, historian and Ekushey Padak recipient, was born in Banshkhali in 1928.

== See also ==
- Banshkhali power plant movement
- Banshkhali carnage
