= Murder of Jamaluddin Ahmed Chowdhury =

2003 kidnapping and murder of a Bangladeshi businessman

Jamaluddin Ahmed Chowdhury
- Born: Jamaluddin Ahmed Chowdhury
- Died: 2003
- Cause of death: Murder
- Occupations: Businessman; Politician
- Spouse: Nazma Akhter Khanam
- Children: Chowdhury Farman Reza Chowdhury Arman Reza Chowdhury Forkan Reza

Jamaluddin Ahmed Chowdhury, a businessman and former leader of the Chittagong District unit of the Bangladesh Nationalist Party (BNP), was kidnapped and murdered in Chittagong in 2003. His skeleton was recovered two years later. The Daily Star described the case as ‘sensational’. Sarwar Jamal Nizam, a BNP politician and former member of parliament for Chittagong‑12, was accused of diverting the investigation to protect his brother, who was also implicated in the case.

== Background ==
In 2003, Chittagong District recorded a rise in kidnappings and violent incidents, with over 1,500 crimes and 265 murders reported during the year. Cases included the abduction and murder of businessman Rezaur Rahman Zakir and the Banshkhali carnage, in which 11 members of a Hindu family were killed. Other notable murders included three brothers in Chariya, Mirzapur. The death of college student Rafeza Khanam Poppy and the suicide of college student Umme Habiba Rumi following harassment also drew public attention.

Political violence during the year included the murder of two Awami League activists inside a madrasa in Hathazari Upazila on the night of Eid al-Fitr and the killing of Sramik Dal leader Shafiuddin Ahmed in Ambagan. In a separate legal development, four members of Islami Chhatra Shibir were sentenced to death in February in connection with the 2001 murder of college principal Gopal Krishna Muhuri.

These incidents, along with a series of abductions for ransom and the disappearance of Jamaluddin Ahmed Chowdhury, contributed to a perceived sense of insecurity among the public. The growing concern over law and order during this period prompted the government to carry out a reshuffle of the police leadership in Chittagong.

== Incident ==
On 24 July 2003, Jamaluddin Ahmed Chowdhury was traveling from his office in Chawkbazar to his home in Chandgaon residential area when he was kidnapped. His kidnappers demanded a 10 million BDT ransom. Bangladesh Police suspected he was killed after 60 days of the kidnapping. According to one of the accused, he was held in Fatikchhari. Accused Shahid Chairman would later claim he was killed by strangulation and that it was done on the orders of Maruf Nizam who promised them 10 million BDT for the murder.

The Bangladesh Nationalist Party government made three top police officers officers on special duty as punishment for their failure in the Jamaluddin Ahmed Chowdhury case. They were Shahidullah Khan, Commissioner of Chittagong Metropolitan Police, Additional Deputy Inspector General of Chittagong Division of police, Naim Ahmed, and Motiur Rahman, Superintendent of Police of Chittagong District. The government transferred and/or punished 200 police officers.

Farid Ahmad Chowdhury, former president of Chittagong Chamber of Commerce and Industry, expressed frustration over the failure to locate Jamaluddin. In August 2003, Bangladesh Army and Bangladesh Rifles were deployed alongside the police to search for him. The vice-president of the Bangladesh Garment Manufacturers and Exporters Association, SM Nurul Hoque, expressed disappointment with the lack of results. Altaf Hossain Chowdhury, Minister of Home Affairs, said that Jamaluddin Ahmed Chowdhury would be rescued soon as they had specific information about his location. Inspector General of Police (IGP) Shahudul Haque visited Chittagong to increase the speed of the investigation. Government also deployed intelligence agents.

Rapid Action Battalion recovered his body from Satkainda Tilla on 24 August 2005 after being led to the spot by Kala Mahbub, a suspect in the murder. It was recovered from the property of an accused Abul Kashem Chowdhury, chairman of Kanchan Nagar Union Parishad.

== Reaction ==
=== Investigation ===
On 12 December 2003, Amar Das, a suspect in the kidnapping was killed in police custody six hours after being detained. His body had signs of torture.

On 15 August 2005, Rapid Action Battalion arrested Anwara union parishad chairman Shahid, the main accused in the kidnapping and murder, from Patenga beach. He would later confess that Jamaluddin Ahmed Chowdhury was killed on 24 July 2003. He stated the killers were Kala (black) Mahboob, Lamba (tall) Mahboob, and Babu. He said business partners of Maruf Nizam, Helal and Shahjahan, were involved. Maruf Nizam is the brother of Sarwar Jamal Nizam, a member of parliament of the Bangladesh Nationalist Party. He also alleged Akhteruzzaman Chowdhury Babu, member of parliament of Awami League, was involved along with his sons, Saifuzzaman Chowdhury Javed and Zia.

Chowdhury's eldest son, Chowdhury Farman Reza Liton, and wife, Nazma Akhtar Khanam, met with the Minister of Home Affairs Lutfozzaman Babar. Chowdhury Forman Reza Liton was critical of chairman Shahid's statements. He said Shahid had admitted Sarwar Jamal Nizam and his brother Maruf Nizam was involved which Babar denied. Babar said Akhtaruzzaman Chowdhury Babu was involved but Liton believed it was a diversion tactic as they have no problems with Akhtaruzzaman Chowdhury Babu. After the meeting officials of the Ministry of Home Affairs tried to prevent prevent the family from talking to the media. His family talked with Harris Chowdhury seeking justice.

The Criminal Investigation Department pressed charges against 16 on 20 July 2006. Jamaluddin Ahmed Chowdhury's son, Chowdhury Farman Reza, filed a narazi (non-acceptance) petition against the charge sheet as it did not include the alleged mastermind Maruf Nizam and Sarwar Jamal Nizam. The High Court Division issued a stay order against the narazi petition.

In June 2007, Nazma Akter Chowdhury welcomed the arrest of Sarwar Jamal Nizam by Rapid Action Battalion. She had accused the former Minister of Home Affairs Lutfozzaman Babar of taking bribes to protect the accused. The family of Jamaluddin Ahmed Chowdhury wanted to file a corruption case against Lutfozzaman Babar, Maruf Nizam, Sarwar Jamal Nizam, and Shahjahan Omar.

Detective Branch of Chittagong Metropolitan Police arrested suspect Sultan Driver in March 2011 from Cox's Bazar. In January 2023, Md Abul Kashem Chowdhury, was sent to jail after he asked for bail from the Fifth Additional Chattogram Metropolitan Session Judge's Court.

== Legacy ==
In November 2003, Abu Sayed, director of Shanta Group, was kidnapped and the police advised his family to pay the one million BDT ransom to avoid the fate of Jamaluddin Ahmed Chowdhury.

In 2008, the Jamal Uddin Smriti Parishad campaigned against Sarwar Jamal Nizam who received nomination for the parliamentary elections from Bangladesh Nationalist Party for Chittagong-12. They called him a killer a protest at the Chittagong Press Club.
