= Shamsul Haque Chowdhury =

Bangladeshi politician (born 1957)

- শামসুল হক চৌধুরী

Member of the Bangladesh Parliament for Chittagong-11
- In office 2008–2014
- Preceded by: Gazi Shahjahan Jwel
- Succeeded by: M. Abdul Latif

Member of the Bangladesh Parliament for Chittagong-12
- In office 2014–2023
- Preceded by: Saifuzzaman Chowdhury
- Succeeded by: Motaherul Islam Chowdhury

Personal details
- Born: 20 July 1957 (age 69) Shovonandi, Patiya Upazila, Chittagong District
- Party: Awami League

Shamsul Haque Chowdhury (Bengali: শামসুল হক চৌধুরী; born 20 July 1957) is a Bangladesh Awami League politician and a former member of parliament from Chittagong-12. He is also the general secretary of Chittagong based football club Chittagong Abahani.

== Early life ==
Chowdhury was born 20 July 1957 in Shovonandi, Patiya Upazila, Chittagong District.

== Career ==
Chowdhury received the prestigious National Sports Award 2013 in Organizer (football) category. Chowdhury was a councilor of Bangladesh Football Federation in 2008. In April 2008, before the elections of Bangladesh Football Federation, he filed a motion challenging the candidacy of Ashraf Uddin Ahmed Chunnu, Golam Rabbani Helal, and Kazi Salahuddin. His motion was dismissed by the election commission of the federation. In July 2008, he was made a member of the development committee of Bangladesh Football Federation.

Chowdhury was elected to Parliament from Chittagong-11 in 2008 as a candidate of Awami League. In January 2012, he was investigated by the Anti-Corruption Commission for allegation of irregularities over the distribution of government relief.

Chowdhury was elected to parliament from Chittagong-12 as a candidate of Awami League in 2014. he filled nomination papers for the post of Vice-President of Bangladesh Football Federation in April 2016.

Chowdhury is the general secretary of Chittagong based football club Chittagong Abahani. He is the chairperson of District Football Association (DFA) Monitoring Committee of Bangladesh Football Federation. He was re-elected to parliament from Chittagong-12 as a candidate of Awami League.

Chittagong Abahani was raided by Rapid Action Battalion who found cards used for gambling. Chowdhury told the Prothom Alo that if the youth weren't allowed to play cards they would mug people and expressed anger over the raids by law enforcement agencies. Khorshed Alam Sujan, Vice President of Chittagong Awami League, said that Chowdhury was an "infiltrator" who had previously elected ward commissioner on a Jatiya Party nomination in the 1980s. He also said it was an "open secret" that gambling took place at Abahani club in Chittagong. Chowdhury's son, Nazmul Karim Chowdhury Sharun, also faced criticism after a phone call was leaked in which he threatened to beat up Chittagong Awami League sports affairs secretary, Didarul Alam Chowdhury. Around the same time a video of Sharun shooting an Ak style rifle went viral in Bangladesh and for which he faced criticism. After the video, he was excluded from the entourage of Prime Minister Sheikh Hasina to the India Economic Summit of the World Economic Forum.

On 26 September 2019, an Inspector of Bangladesh Police, Mahmud Saiful Amin, was suspended after he alleged Chowdhury was involved in the casino operations in Chittagong and used to collect money from them along with some corrupt police officers. On 19 October 2019, Anti-Corruption Commission announced that it was investigating Chowdhury and a few other Awami League politicians on corruption allegation and involvement with the illegal casino operations. The commission announced it was getting ready to file charges against Chowdhury. In November 2019 a travel ban was imposed on him. The case was dropped in May 2023. Chowdhury commented:

I have respect for the country's judiciary, constitutional institutions, and media. The ACC has the authority to conduct inquiries and investigations against anyone. However, disclosing information in the media at the initial stage of an investigation without determining its veracity causes respectable persons in society to suffer social, political, and family embarrassment. Nevertheless, I applaud the ACC for conducting an impartial investigation.

== Personal life ==
Chowdhury was infected with COVID-19 on 26 December 2020.
