= Chittagong-12 =

Constituency of Bangladesh's Jatiya Sangsad

Coordinates: 22.30°N 91.97°E

- Constituency for the Jatiya Sangsad
- District: Chittagong District
- Division: Chittagong Division
- Electorate: 352,695 (2026)

Current constituency
- Created: 1973
- Party: Bangladesh Nationalist Party
- Member: Enamul Haque Enam
- ← 288 Chittagong-11 290 Chittagong-13 →

Chittagong-12 is a constituency represented in the Jatiya Sangsad (National Parliament) of Bangladesh since 2026 by Enamul Haque Enam of the Bangladesh Nationalist Party.

== Boundaries ==
The constituency encompasses all but five union parishads of Patiya Upazila: Bara Uthan, Char Lakshya, Char Patharghata, Juldha, and Sikalbaha.

== History ==
The constituency was created for the first general elections in newly independent Bangladesh, held in 1973.

Ahead of the 2014 general election, the Election Commission renumbered the seat for Sandwip Upazila from Chittagong-16 to Chittagong-3, bumping up by one the suffix of the former constituency of that name and the higher numbered constituencies in the district. Thus Chittagong-12 covers the area previously covered by Chittagong-11. Previously Chittagong-12 encompassed Anowara Upazila and five union parishads of Patiya Upazila: Bara Uthan, Char Lakshya, Char Patharghata, Juldha, and Sikalbaha.

== Members of Parliament ==
Election	Member	Party
1973	Mohammad Idris	Awami League
1979	Shahadat Hossain Chowdhury	Bangladesh Nationalist Party
1986	Akhtaruzzaman Chowdhury Babu	Jatiya Party
1988	Mokhtar Ahmad	
1991	Akhtaruzzaman Chowdhury Babu	Awami League
Feb 1996	Sarwar Jamal Nizam	Bangladesh Nationalist Party
Jun 1996	Sarwar Jamal Nizam	Bangladesh Nationalist Party
2001	Sarwar Jamal Nizam	Bangladesh Nationalist Party
2008	Akhtaruzzaman Chowdhury Babu	Awami League
Major Boundary Changes
2013 by-election	Saifuzzaman Chowdhury Javed	Awami League
2014	Shamsul Haque Chowdhury	Awami League
2018	Shamsul Haque Chowdhury	Awami League
2024	Motaherul Islam Chowdhury	Awami League
2026	Enamul Haque Enam	Bangladesh Nationalist Party

== Elections ==
=== Elections in the 2020s ===
General Election 2026: Chittagong-12
Party	Candidate	Votes	%	±%
BNP	Enamul Haque Enam	135,044	71.6	N/A
BIF	Syed Ali Mohammad Payaru	28,999	15.4	N/A
Jamaat	Mohammad Faridul Alam	21,706	11.5	N/A
IBB	Mohammad Abu Taleb Helali	929	0.5	N/A
IAB	S. M. Belal Noor	901	0.5	N/A
JP(E)	Farid Ahmed Chowdhury	732	0.4	N/A
Independent	Mohammad Shakhawat Hossain	243	0.1	N/A
LDP	M. Eyakub Ali	118	0.1	N/A
Majority		106,045	56.2	N/A
Turnout		188,672	53.5	N/A
BNP gain from AL				

=== Elections in the 2010s ===
General Election 2014: Chittagong-12
Party	Candidate	Votes	%	±%
AL	Shamsul Haque Chowdhury	128,214	92.6	+37.9
JP(E)	Sirajul Islam Chowdhury	10,197	7.4	N/A
Majority		118,017	85.3	+73.4
Turnout		138,411	55.4	−32.6
AL hold				

Akhtaruzzaman Chowdhury Babu died in November 2012. Saifuzzaman Chowdhury Javed of the Awami League was elected in a January 2013 by-election.

=== Elections in the 2000s ===
General Election 2008: Chittagong-12
Party	Candidate	Votes	%	±%
AL	Akhtaruzzaman Chowdhury Babu	110,951	54.7	+9.3
BNP	Sarwar Jamal Nizam	86,751	42.7	−8.2
BIF	M. A. Matin	4,307	2.1	0.0
Gano Forum	Uzzal Bhumik	517	0.3	N/A
BKA	Rashidul Haq	428	0.2	N/A
Majority		24,200	11.9	+6.4
Turnout		202,954	88.0	+17.5
AL gain from BNP				

General Election 2001: Chittagong-12
Party	Candidate	Votes	%	±%
BNP	Sarwar Jamal Nizam	76,473	50.9	+3.6
AL	Akhtaruzzaman Chowdhury Babu	68,187	45.4	+7.9
BIF	Abdu Noor Chowdhury	3,081	2.1	−0.7
IJOF	Abdus Sattar Rani	1,680	1.1	N/A
Independent	Syed Jamal Ahmmad	229	0.2	N/A
Independent	Abdul Hye	150	0.1	N/A
Independent	Md. Abul Kalam Bakul	133	0.1	N/A
Bangladesh Progressive Party	Ali Ahmad Talukder	128	0.1	N/A
JSD	Md. Abu Taher Bangali	96	0.1	N/A
Majority		8,286	5.5	−4.3
Turnout		150,157	70.5	+0.1
BNP hold				

=== Elections in the 1990s ===
General Election June 1996: Chittagong-12
Party	Candidate	Votes	%	±%
BNP	Sarwar Jamal Nizam	52,792	47.3	+10.2
AL	Ataur Rahman Khan Kaisa	41,901	37.5	−10.0
JP(E)	Ukil Shahadat Hossain Chowdhury	8,926	8.0	+0.4
Jamaat	Sumsuddin Ahmed Mirza	4,212	3.8	+1.0
BIF	Md. Momtaz Uddin Chowdhury	3,084	2.8	+0.3
NAP (Bhashani)	Nurul Haque	281	0.3	+0.1
BKA	Rashidul Haq	212	0.2	N/A
Zaker Party	Chitto Sen Barua	212	0.2	−0.1
Majority		10,891	9.8	−0.6
Turnout		111,620	70.4	+22.7
BNP gain from AL				

General Election 1991: Chittagong-12
Party	Candidate	Votes	%	±%
AL	Akhtaruzzaman Chowdhury Babu	42,973	47.5	
BNP	Md. Labir	33,563	37.1	
JP(E)	Shahadat Hossain Chowdhury	6,861	7.6	
Jamaat	Md. Hasan	2,562	2.8	
BIF	Md. Momtaz Uddin Chowdhury	2,249	2.5	
Bangladesh Janata Party	Aminur Rahman	984	1.1	
Bangladesh Samajtantrik Dal (Khalekuzzaman)	Akhter Kabir	399	0.4	
Zaker Party	Amir Ahmed Khan	249	0.3	
NAP (Bhashani)	Nurul Haq	199	0.2	
Independent	A. Haq	171	0.2	
Jatiya Samajtantrik Dal-JSD	Mokhter Ahmad	146	0.2	
Bangladesh Muslim League (Kader)	Ali Ahmad Talukder	95	0.1	
Majority		9,410	10.4	
Turnout		90,451	47.7	
AL gain from				
