= Shahadat Hossain Chowdhury (politician) =

Bangladeshi politician (died 2021)

- শাহাদত হোসেন চৌধুরী

Member of Parliament for Chittagong-12
- In office 1979–1986
- Preceded by: Mohammad Idris
- Succeeded by: Akhtaruzzaman Chowdhury Babu

Personal details
- Died: 29 November 2021 Dhaka, Bangladesh
- Political party: Bangladesh Nationalist Party

Shahadat Hossain Chowdhury (died on 29 November 2021) was a Bangladesh Nationalist Party politician and a Jatiya Sangsad member representing the Chittagong-12 constituency during 1979–1986.
