= Enamul Haque Enam =

Bangladesh Nationalist Party politician

Mohammed Enamul Hoque Enam

Member of Parliament
- Incumbent
- Assumed office 17 February 2026
- Preceded by: Motaherul Islam Chowdhury
- Constituency: Chittagong-12

Personal details
- Born: March 5, 1969 (age 57) Patiya, Chattogram, Bangladesh
- Party: Bangladesh Nationalist Party
- Spouse: Parvin Akter
- Children: 2
- Occupation: Politician

Mohammed Enamul Hoque Enam is a Bangladeshi politician with the Bangladesh Nationalist Party. He was elected as the Member of Parliament for the Chittagong-12 constituency in the 2026 Bangladeshi general election held on 12 February 2026.
