= Chittagong-11 =

Constituency of Bangladesh's Jatiya Sangsad

Coordinates: 22.29°N 91.79°E

- Constituency for the Jatiya Sangsad
- District: Chittagong District
- Division: Chittagong Division
- Electorate: 495,278 (2026)

Current constituency
- Created: 1973
- Party: Bangladesh Nationalist Party
- Member: Amir Khasru Mahmud Chowdhury
- ← 287 Chittagong-10 289 Chittagong-12 →

Chittagong-11 is a constituency represented in the Jatiya Sangsad (National Parliament) of Bangladesh since 2026 by Amir Khasru Mahmud Chowdhury of the Bangladesh Nationalist Party.

== Boundaries ==
The constituency encompasses Chittagong City Corporation wards 27 through 30 and 36 through 41.

== History ==
The constituency was created for the first general elections in newly independent Bangladesh, held in 1973.

Ahead of the 2008 general election, the Election Commission redrew constituency boundaries to reflect population changes revealed by the 2001 Bangladesh census. The 2008 redistricting altered the boundaries of the constituency.

Ahead of the 2014 general election, the Election Commission renumbered the seat for Sandwip Upazila from Chittagong-16 to Chittagong-3, bumping up by one the suffix of the former constituency of that name and the higher numbered constituencies in the district. Thus Chittagong-11 covers the area previously covered by Chittagong-10. Previously Chittagong-11 encompassed all but five union parishads of Patiya Upazila: Bara Uthan, Char Lakshya, Char Patharghata, Juldha, and Sikalbaha .

== Members of Parliament ==
Election	Member	Party
1973	Nurul Islam Chowdhury	Awami League
1979	Nazrul Islam	Bangladesh Nationalist Party
1986	Chowdhury Harunur Rashid	Jatiya Party
1988	Sirajul Islam Chowdhury	Jatiya Party
1991	Md. Shah Newaz Chowdhury	Bangladesh Nationalist Party
Feb 1996	Md. Shah Newaz Chowdhury	Bangladesh Nationalist Party
Jun 1996	Gazi Md. Shahjahan	Bangladesh Nationalist Party
2001	Gazi Md. Shahjahan	Bangladesh Nationalist Party
Major Boundary Changes
2008	Shamsul Haq Chowdhury	Awami League
Major Boundary Changes
2014	M. Abdul Latif	Awami League
2018	M. Abdul Latif	Awami League
2024	M. Abdul Latif	Awami League
2026	Amir Khasru Mahmud Chowdhury	Bangladesh Nationalist Party

== Elections ==
=== Elections in the 2020s ===
General Election 2026: Chittagong-11
Party	Candidate	Votes	%	±%
BNP	Amir Khasru Mahmud Chowdhury	115,999	57.3	N/A
Jamaat	Mohammad Shafiul Alam	76,681	37.9	N/A
Islamic Front	Muhammad Abu Taher	5,127	2.5	N/A
IAB	Noor Uddin	2,557	1.3	N/A
JP(E)	Abu Taher	1,004	0.5	N/A
Gano Forum	Ujjal Bhowmik	307	0.2	N/A
BSD (Marxist)	Dipa Majumder	231	0.1	N/A
IBB	Md. Aziz Mia	210	0.1	N/A
Independent	Mohammad Jahangir Bhuiyan	178	0.1	N/A
BSD	Md. Nizamul Haque Al Qaderi	120	0.1	N/A
GOP	Muhammad Nezam Uddin	104	0.1	N/A
Majority		39,318	19.4	N/A
Turnout		202,518	40.9	N/A
Registered electors		495,278		
BNP gain from AL				

=== Elections in the 2010s ===
General Election 2018: Chittagong-11
Party	Candidate	Votes	%	±%
AL	M. Abdul Latif	283,169	83.42	−12.78
BNP	Amir Khasru Mahmud Chowdhury	52,898	15.58	−28.92
IAB	Md. Lokman Sawdagar	3,382	1.00	+0.20
Majority		230,271	67.84	−19.96
Turnout		339,449	66.90	+53.00
Registered electors		507,405		
AL hold				

General Election 2014: Chittagong-11
Party	Candidate	Votes	%	±%
AL	M. Abdul Latif	65,011	96.2	+40.8
JP(E)	Kamal Uddin Chowdhury	2,007	3.0	N/A
JSD	Md. Jasim Uddin	582	0.9	N/A
Majority		76,180	87.8	+72.5
Turnout		67,600	13.9	−72.6
AL hold				

=== Elections in the 2000s ===
General Election 2008: Chittagong-11
Party	Candidate	Votes	%	±%
AL	Shamsul Haq Chowdhury	103,869	55.4	+14.3
BNP	Gazi Md. Shahjahan	75,156	40.1	−11.8
BIF	Gazi Mohammad Monjurul Karim	5,936	3.2	+0.9
NAP	Chandroshakhor Nath	1,344	0.7	N/A
BSD	Saifuddin Moha. Unus	572	0.3	N/A
CPB	A. F. M. Shah Alam	528	0.3	N/A
Majority		28,713	15.3	+4.5
Turnout		187,405	86.5	+12.9
AL gain from BNP				

General Election 2001: Chittagong-11
Party	Candidate	Votes	%	±%
BNP	Gazi Md. Shahjahan	79,914	51.9	+9.7
AL	Moslem Uddin Ahmad	63,250	41.1	+4.4
Jatiya Party (M)	Samsul Alam	4,503	2.9	N/A
BIF	Md. Nurul Absar	3,558	2.3	+0.2
IJOF	Md. Ferdous Chowdhury	1,539	1.0	N/A
Gano Forum	A. M. Moazzem Hossain	395	0.3	N/A
Independent	Nazim Uddin	302	0.2	N/A
Independent	Md. Shahjahan	269	0.2	N/A
Independent	Md. Ibrahim	161	0.1	N/A
Bangladesh Progressive Party	Md. Ayub Ali	145	0.1	N/A
Majority		16,664	10.8	+5.2
Turnout		154,036	73.6	−0.3
BNP hold				

=== Elections in the 1990s ===
General Election June 1996: Chittagong-11
Party	Candidate	Votes	%	±%
BNP	Gazi Md. Shahjahan	49,248	42.2	−1.9
AL	Moslem Uddin Ahmad	42,774	36.7	+1.2
JP(E)	Samsul Alam	17,148	14.7	+4.0
Jamaat	Mohammad Rafiqul Islam	3,712	3.2	N/A
BIF	Md. Nurul Absar	2,412	2.1	−3.5
CPB	Abdus Salam	431	0.4	−0.9
Zaker Party	Sheikh Nazrul Islam Mahmud	237	0.2	−0.6
Gano Forum	A. K. M. Moazzem Hossain	155	0.1	N/A
Independent	M. A. Zafar	145	0.1	N/A
Independent	Jomil Ahmed Chowdhury	100	0.1	N/A
Independent	A. K. M. Shajahan Uddin	79	0.1	N/A
NAP (Bhashani)	Md. Ayub Ali	74	0.1	−0.2
Bangladesh Muslim League (Jamir Ali)	A. K. M. Ekramul Haque Kaderi	60	0.1	N/A
Majority		6,474	5.6	−3.0
Turnout		116,575	73.9	+14.9
BNP hold				

General Election 1991: Chittagong-11
Party	Candidate	Votes	%	±%
BNP	Md. Shah Newaz Chowdhury	48,715	44.1	
AL	S. M. Yusuf	39,215	35.5	
JP(E)	Samsul Alam	11,846	10.7	
BIF	Md. Monjur Alam	6,202	5.6	
Bangladesh Janata Party	Md. Ali	1,745	1.6	
CPB	Shah Alam	1,436	1.3	
Zaker Party	Md. Shah Alam	831	0.8	
NAP (Bhashani)	Abdul Gaffar	353	0.3	
Majority		9,500	8.6	
Turnout		110,343	59.0	
BNP gain from				
