= Chowdhury Harunur Rashid =

Bangladeshi politician

Member of Bangladesh Parliament
- In office 1986–1988
- Preceded by: Nazrul Islam
- Succeeded by: Sirajul Islam Chowdhury

Personal details
- Party: Jatiya Party (Ershad)

Chowdhury Harunur Rashid is a Jatiya Party (Ershad) politician and a former member of parliament for Chittagong-11.

== Career ==
Rashid was elected to parliament from Chittagong-11 as a Jatiya Party candidate in 1986.
