= Shah Newaz Chowdhury =

Bangladeshi politician

Md. Shah Newaz Chowdhury

Member of Parliament
- In office 1991 – June 1996
- Preceded by: Sirajul Islam Chowdhury
- Succeeded by: Gazi Md. Shahjahan

Personal details
- Died: 29 December 1997
- Party: Bangladesh Nationalist Party

Md. Shah Newaz Chowdhury (Bengali: শাহ নেওয়াজ চৌধুরী মন্টু) was a Bangladesh Nationalist Party politician, industrialist, and a member of parliament for Chittagong-11.

== Career ==
Chowdhury was elected to parliament from Chittagong-11 (Patiya Upazila) as a Bangladesh Nationalist Party candidate in 1991 with 48,715 votes. His nearest rival was S M Yusuf of the Awami League with 39,215 votes. In 1992, he oversaw the construction of the Patiya-Kharna road. He was re-elected in the February 1996 Bangladeshi general election.

== Death ==
Chowdhury died on 29 December 1997. Shah Newaz Chowdhury Montu Smriti Sangsad is an organization dedicated to remembering his name and legacy.
