= Bangladesh Islami Chhatra Sena =

Bangladeshi student organisation

Bangladesh Islami Chattra Sena বাংলাদেশ ইসলামী ছাত্রসেনা
- President: Mohammad Azad Hossain
- Secretary General: Mohammad Alauddin
- Founded: 21 January 1980; 46 years ago
- Headquarters: Dhaka, Bangladesh
- Ideology: Barelvi
- National affiliation: Bangladesh Islami Front
- Website: www.chattrasena.org

Flag

Bangladesh Islami Chattra Sena (Bengali: বাংলাদেশ ইসলামী ছাত্রসেনা), is a far-right student political organization in Bangladesh. It is the student wing of Bangladesh Islami Front. The organization follows the Barlevi Movement and the Hanafi, Maliki, Shafi'i and Hanbali schools of Islamic jurisprudence, as well as the Sufi orders of Qadri, Chistia, Nakshbandia, Shohrawardya and Muzaddedia. The current president of the party is Sifuddin Ahmad, and secretary is Abdullah Al Jaber.

== History ==
The student organisation Bangladesh Islami Chattra Sena was founded on 21 January 1980. The founder of the student wing was M.A. Mannan, who later became the chairman of the party as a whole. President Sifuddin Ahmad was elected for the 2022-23 session by Bangladesh Islami Front's delegates. General Secretary Abdullah Al Jaber was the general secretary of the 2022-23 session.

== Flag ==
Party flag

The organization's flag is composed of three colors, with black as a symbol of Baitullah in Mecca, green as a symbol of tomb of the prophet's grave in Medina and white as a symbol of peace.

== Logo ==
The logo is a half moon with a star above it. Under the moon a verse of the Quran—Ja al Haqqu wajaahaqai Batilu (truth comes and false removes).

== Protests ==
In August 2014, Bangladesh Islami Chattra Sena chief Muhammad Nurul Haq Chisty made the announcement at a press meet that half-day strike across Bangladesh would be observed to demand the arrest and trial of the killers of party leader Nurul Islam Farooqi.

Days later, Bangladesh Islami Chhatra Sena formed a human chain on the Dhaka-Sylhet Highway's Ashuganj Goalchattor area demanding exemplary punishment for the killers.
