= Mamtaz Begum =

Bangladeshi politician

Member of Bangladesh Parliament
- In office September 1996 – 2001
- Preceded by: Oli Ahmad
- Succeeded by: Oli Ahmad

Personal details
- Party: Bangladesh Nationalist Party
- Spouse: Oli Ahmad

Mamtaz Begum is a Bangladesh Nationalist Party politician and the former member of parliament for Chittagong-13.

== Career ==
Begum was elected to parliament from Chittagong-13 as a Bangladesh Nationalist Party candidate in 1996 by-election. The by-elections were called after Oli Ahmed, who was elected from two constituencies, resigned and choose to represent Chittagong-14.
