= Nurul Islam Farooqi =

Bangladeshi Islamic scholar

Allama Nurul Islam Faruqi
- নুরুল ইসলাম ফারুকী

Personal life
- Born: 24 November 1959 Naotari Nawabganj, Boda, Panchagarh, East Pakistan
- Died: 27 August 2014 (aged 54) Dhaka, Bangladesh
- Resting place: Naotari Nawabganj, Boda Upazila
- Region: Bangladesh
- Main interest(s): Sufism, Sunni Hanafi jurisprudence

Religious life
- Religion: Islam
- Denomination: Sunni
- Jurisprudence: Hanafi
- Movement: Barelvi movement

Maulana Sheikh Nurul Islam Farooqi (Bengali: নুরুল ইসলাম ফারুকী) was a Bangladeshi Islamic scholar, businessman, politician, and preacher. He was killed by unknown assailants in 2014.

== Background ==
Nurul Islam Farooqi was born on 24 November 1959 in the village of Naotari Nawabganj, Boda Upazila, Panchagarh district. His father, Jamshed Ali, was a scholar. Farooqi anchored such programs as Shantir Pothe and Kafela on Channel I, and Haq Kotha on MyTv. He served as the Khatib of the Supreme Court mosque. Politically, he was a presidium member and the international affairs secretary of Ahle Sunnat Wal Jamaat and served as the presidium member of Bangladesh Islami Front, a platform of several Islamist groups. Apart from this, he owned a Hajj agency known as Faruque Tours and Travels.

== Death ==
On 27 August 2014, Farooqi was killed by 8–10 unknown assailants in his Rajabazar office. Earlier a mystery woman had telephoned him repeatedly in order to visit him at his home. Witnesses said the woman, who was in her forties, was nervous and behaved oddly during her two-hour stay at Farooqi's house. His family claimed that several youths had come to the house to talk over Hajj and killed him. According to a local imam, two youths came to his house at around 8:30 PM, and 6–7 armed youths entered the house and demanded all the money he had. When Farooqi said that he had around 100,000 taka at home, they said this money would not do for so many of them. They tied his hands and legs with clothes in his bedroom and slaughtered him before leaving. His family was left unharmed.

== Reactions ==
Farooqi's wife claimed that if the mystery woman was arrested, the culprits would be caught. His son, Ahmed Reza Farooqi, read a written statement saying, "My father was a believer of 'Sunni' ideology. He had received death threats on mobile phone and Facebook from those who opposed his ideology. Extremists or Khareji-Wahabi Ahle Hadith killed him. It was a planned murder." He also played down any role of his personal life or business relations over the matter.

Faruqi's murder triggered protests by several Islamic groups, who called a nationwide strike to demand the culprits' swift arrest. Mosaheb Uddin Bakhtiar, presidium member of Ahle Sunnat, blamed "the followers of Wahabi and Moududi" for the murder. "It was a planned murder as Maulana Faruqi was a supporter of Sunni (sic) and he was publishing truth through the media", he added. Members of Ahle Sunnat protested the murder of Farooqi in Chittagong by blocking the city's Muradpur intersection.

In August 2014, the head of Bangladesh Islami Chhatra Sena, Muhammad Nurul Haq Chisty, made the announcement at a press meet that a half-day strike across Bangladesh would be observed demanding the arrest and trial of the killers of Farooqi. Bangladesh Islami Chhatra Sena formed a human chain on the Dhaka-Sylhet Highway's Ashuganj area to demand punishment for the killers. The World Sunni Movement also organized several peaceful human chains under the direction of Syed Imam Hayat, demanding justice for the real killers.

=== Arrests ===
On 29 August, police detained the "mystery woman" named Mahbuba from Narayanganj's Rupganj area for her alleged involvement with the murder.

A decade later, it was announced that Farooqi was "murdered by extremists, including Jama'atul Mujahideen Bangladesh (JMB) member 'Jamai' Faruque, over ideological differences". The accused named in the charge sheet are Hadisur Rahman Sagar, Abdullah Al Tasnim Nahid, Rafiqul Islam Fardin, Abu Raihan Mahmud Abdul Hadi, Mahmud Ibn Bashar, and Ratan Chowdhury (alias Engineer Rakibul Islam Reaz). Sagar, Nahid, and Ratan are in custody, while the remaining three suspects are fugitives. However, the "mystery woman", Mahbuba, appears to have never been charged or indicted.

== Personal life ==
Farooqi had two wives. His second wife, Lubna Islam, lived with him at the Razabazar home, while his first wife and her children lived in the Malibagh area of Dhaka.
