= Chittagong-13 =

Constituency of Bangladesh's Jatiya Sangsad

Coordinates: 22.22°N 91.90°E

- Constituency for the Jatiya Sangsad
- District: Chittagong District
- Division: Chittagong Division
- Electorate: 395,246 (2026)

Current constituency
- Created: 1973
- Party: Bangladesh Nationalist Party
- Member: Sarwar Jamal Nizam
- ← 289 Chittagong-12 291 Chittagong-14 →

Chittagong-13 is a constituency represented in the Jatiya Sangsad (National Parliament) of Bangladesh since 2026 by Sarwar Jamal Nizam of the Bangladesh Nationalist Party.

== Boundaries ==
The constituency encompasses Karnaphuli Thana, Anwara Upazila, and five union parishads of Patiya Upazila: Bara Uthan, Char Lakshya, Char Patharghata, Juldha, and Sikalbaha.

== History ==
The constituency was created for the first general elections in newly independent Bangladesh, held in 1973.

Ahead of the 2008 general election, the Election Commission redrew constituency boundaries to reflect population changes revealed by the 2001 Bangladesh census. The 2008 redistricting altered the boundaries of the constituency.

Ahead of the 2014 general election, the Election Commission renumbered the seat for Sandwip Upazila from Chittagong-16 to Chittagong-3, bumping up by one the suffix of the former constituency of that name and the higher numbered constituencies in the district. Thus Chittagong-13 covers the area previously covered by Chittagong-12. Previously Chittagong-13 encompassed Chandanaish Upazila and seven union parishads of Satkania Upazila: Bazalia, Dharmapur, Kaliais, Keochia, Khagaria, Puranagar, and Sadaha.

== Members of Parliament ==
Election	Member	Party
1973	B. M. Faizur Rahman	Awami League
1979	Mahbub Kabir Chowdhury	Bangladesh Nationalist Party
1980 by-election	Oli Ahmad	Bangladesh Nationalist Party
1986	Afsar Uddin Ahmed	National Awami Party
1991	Oli Ahmad	Bangladesh Nationalist Party
Sep 1996 by-election	Mamtaz Begum	Bangladesh Nationalist Party
2001	Oli Ahmad	Bangladesh Nationalist Party
2008	Oli Ahmad	Liberal Democratic Party
Major Boundary Changes
2014	Saifuzzaman Chowdhury	Awami League
2018	Saifuzzaman Chowdhury	Awami League
2024	Saifuzzaman Chowdhury	Awami League
2026	Sarwar Jamal Nizam	Bangladesh Nationalist Party

== Elections ==
=== Elections in the 2020s ===
General Election 2026: Chittagong-13
Party	Candidate	Votes	%	±%
BNP	Sarwar Jamal Nizam	126,192	43.8	N/A
BIF	S. M. Shahjahan	51,450	17.8	N/A
Jamaat	Mahmudul Hasan	35,030	12.1	N/A
JP(E)	Abdur Rob Chowdhury	440	0.2	N/A
NDM	Mohammad Emran	204	0.1	N/A
IBB	Md. Rezaul Mustafa	191	0.1	N/A
GOP	Md. Mujibur Rahman Chong	168	0.1	N/A
Majority		74,742	25.9	N/A
Turnout		288,417	73.0	N/A
Registered electors		395,246		
BNP gain from AL				

=== Elections in the 2010s ===
General Election 2014: Chittagong-13
Party	Candidate	Votes	%	±%
AL	Saifuzzaman Chowdhury	178,985	96.0	+61.6
JP(E)	Tapan Chakrabarti	5,418	2.9	+2.6
BNF	Narayan Rakkhit	1,954	1.0	N/A
Majority		173,567	93.1	+81.7
Turnout		186,357	68.3	−19.8
AL gain from LDP				

=== Elections in the 2000s ===
General Election 2008: Chittagong-13
Party	Candidate	Votes	%	±%
LDP	Oli Ahmad	82,036	45.8	N/A
AL	Afsar Uddin Ahmed	61,646	34.4	−9.9
BNP	Mizanul Haque Chowdhury	33,335	18.6	−35.2
BIF	Shah Kholilur Rhaman	1,284	0.7	−0.5
JP(E)	Mridul Guha	478	0.3	N/A
National People's Party	Md. Aktaruzzaman	167	0.1	N/A
Bangladesh Kalyan Party	Md. Gulam Ishak Khan	83	0.0	N/A
Majority		20,390	11.4	+1.9
Turnout		179,029	88.1	+13.6
LDP gain from BNP				

General Election 2001: Chittagong-13
Party	Candidate	Votes	%	±%
BNP	Oli Ahmad	70,016	53.8	
AL	Abser Uddin Ahmad	57,700	44.3	
BIF	Ahmad Hossain Al Kaderi	1,614	1.2	
IJOF	Mridul Guha	380	0.3	
Independent	Abul Kashem	293	0.2	
Independent	Abdul Nabi	155	0.1	
JSD	Syed Manjur Rahman Jubair	69	0.1	
Majority		12,316	9.5	
Turnout		130,227	74.5	
BNP hold				

=== Elections in the 1990s ===
Oli Ahmad stood for two seats in the June 1996 general election: Chittagong-13 and Chittagong-14. After winning both, he chose to represent Chittagong-14 and quit Chittagong-13, triggering a by-election in Chittagong-13. Mamtaz Begum of the BNP was elected in a September 1996 by-election.

General Election June 1996: Chittagong-13
Party	Candidate	Votes	%	±%
BNP	Oli Ahmad	62,323	61.8	+2.3
AL	Nazrul Islam Chowdhury	30,728	30.5	−0.4
Jamaat	Shamsul Islam	6,433	6.4	−0.6
JP(E)	Mridul Guha	651	0.6	−0.1
CPB	Abdul Nabi	401	0.4	N/A
Zaker Party	Md. Siddiqul Islam	112	0.1	−0.1
FP	Md. Ali Jobaier	85	0.1	−0.1
NAP	Syed Mostafa Kamal	61	0.1	N/A
Majority		31,595	31.3	+2.8
Turnout		100,794	77.7	+21.0
BNP hold				

General Election 1991: Chittagong-13
Party	Candidate	Votes	%	±%
BNP	Oli Ahmad	52,072	59.5	
AL	Zafar Ahmed Chowdhury	27,092	30.9	
Jamaat	Shamsul Islam	6,108	7.0	
BIF	Md. Rezaul Karim	1,129	1.3	
JP(E)	Nurul Absar	612	0.7	
FP	Abu Syed	206	0.2	
Jatiya Samajtantrik Dal-JSD	A. K. M. Shamsuddin	186	0.2	
Zaker Party	Nurul Islam	158	0.2	
Majority		24,980	28.5	
Turnout		87,563	56.7	
BNP gain from NAP				
