= Afsar Uddin Ahmed =

Bangladeshi politician

- আফসার উদ্দিন আহমেদ

Member of Parliament for Chittagong-13
- In office 10 July 1986 – 6 December 1990
- Preceded by: Oli Ahmad
- Succeeded by: Oli Ahmad

Personal details
- Party: National Awami Party

Afsar Uddin Ahmed was a National Awami Party politician in Bangladesh and a Jatiya Sangsad member representing the Chittagong-13 constituency.

== Career ==
Ahmed was elected to parliament from Chittagong-13 as a Jatiya Party candidate in 1986 and 1988. He served as the president of the Chittagong City unit of the Bangladesh Awami League.
