= Oli Ahmad =

Bangladeshi politician

Oli Ahmad BB
- অলি আহমদ
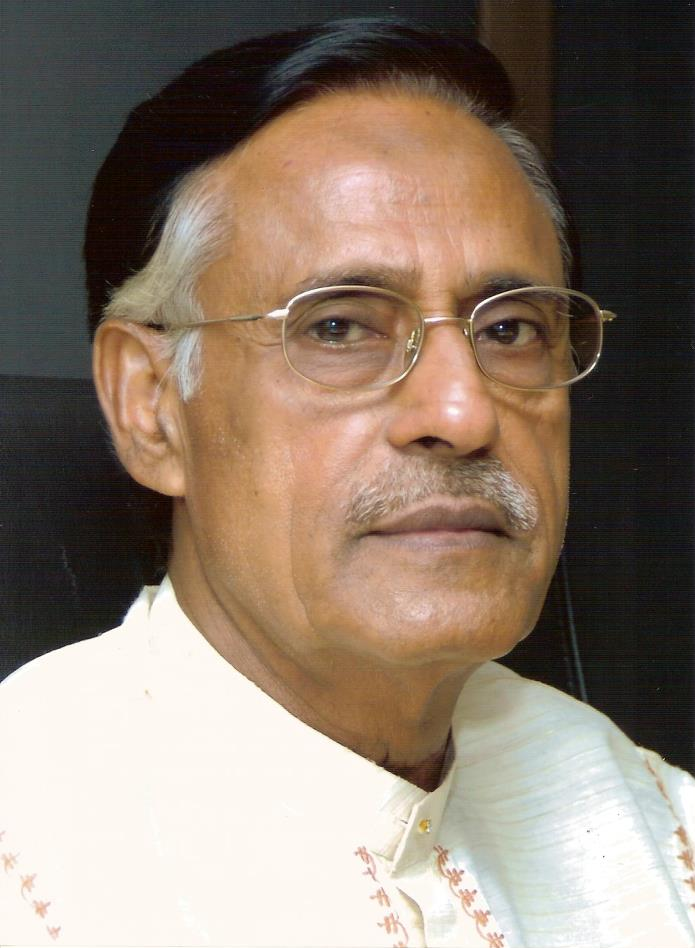
- Oli in 2004

President of Liberal Democratic Party
- Incumbent
- Assumed office 26 October 2006
- Secretary-General: Redwan Ahmed
- Preceded by: office established

Member of Parliament
- In office 28 February 1991 – 5 December 2014
- Preceded by: Afsar Uddin Ahmed
- Succeeded by: Saifuzzaman Chowdhury
- Constituency: Chittagong-13
- In office 10 June 1996 – 25 December 2001
- Preceded by: Shajahan Chowdhury
- Succeeded by: Shajahan Chowdhury
- Constituency: Chittagong-14

Minister of Power, Energy and Mineral Resources
- In office 19 March 1996 – 30 March 1996
- Prime Minister: Khaleda Zia
- Preceded by: Khandaker Mosharraf Hossain
- Succeeded by: Jamilur Reza Choudhury

Minister of Communications
- In office 20 March 1991 – 19 March 1996
- Prime Minister: Khaleda Zia
- Preceded by: Anwar Hossain Manju
- Succeeded by: Abdul Matin Chowdhury

Personal details
- Born: 30 September 1941 (age 85) Chittagong, Bengal, British India
- Party: Liberal Democratic Party (2006–present)
- Other political affiliations: Bangladesh Nationalist Party (1988–2006)
- Spouse: Mamtaz Begum
- Children: 4
- Education: PhD from Oxford Brooks
- Awards: Bir Bikrom

Military service
- Allegiance: Pakistan (before 1971); Bangladesh
- Branch/service: Pakistan Army; Mukti Bahini; Bangladesh Army
- Years of service: 1967-1980
- Rank: Colonel
- Unit: East Bengal Regiment
- Commands: Sub-Commander of Sector - I; BM of Z Force; CO of 24th East Bengal Regiment
- Battles/wars: Bangladesh Liberation War

Oli Ahmad BB (born 30 September 1941) is a Bangladeshi politician who is the current president of the Liberal Democratic Party. He is a former Bangladesh Nationalist Party politician and member of parliament who held several ministral positions. He is also a veteran freedom fighter who fought in the Bangladesh Liberation War.

== Military career ==
=== Pakistan Army ===
He was commissioned in the Pakistani Army in 1967. He was posted to the 4th East Bengal Regiment in 1967. On 24 September 1970, he was posted to the 8th East Bengal Regiment.

=== Liberation War of Bangladesh ===
Ahmad was one of the Bengali military officers to revolt against the Pakistani army on 25 March 1971, before the start of the Bangladesh Liberation War. He was the first officer to be awarded the Bir Bikrom for his bravery during that war. He fought under Major Ziaur Rahman in Sector No. 1.

=== Bangladesh Army ===
After the independence of Bangladesh, he was promoted to the rank of major in October 1972. Later, he served as the 2nd-in-Command of 19,9,10 and 6 East Bengal Regiment. In September 1975, he was promoted to the rank of lieutenant colonel and was appointed as the commanding officer of the 24 East Bengal Regiment in Saidpur. In November 1975, he was posted to Army Headquarters as general staff officer-1 (operations). Later, he served in the offices of army chief, DCMLA, CMLA, and the president of Bangladesh. In January 1980, he was promoted to the rank of colonel. On 10 January 1980, he resigned from the army.

== Political career ==
Ahmad is highly regarded as one of the key founding members of the Bangladesh Nationalist Party (BNP). On 26 October 2006, Ahmad and several other senior leaders of the BNP defected to form the Liberal Democratic Party. At present he is serving as the president of the Liberal Democratic Party. While chief coordinator for the 20 Party Alliance, Ahmad launched a new movement called "Jatiya Mukti Mancha" on 27 June 2019.

== Elections ==
=== General elections ===
Elected Member of Parliament Six times - 1980, 1991, 1996 (twice elected in two elections), 2001 & 2008. In 1996, there were two elections (6th and 7th parliaments); Oli Ahmad was elected MP both times. He was first elected from Chandanaish, in the March 1980 by-election and was in the 2nd parliament.

| General Election | Parliamentary Seat | Vote | Percentage of total vote | Political Party | Result |
|---|---|---|---|---|---|
| 2008 | Chittagong-13 | 82,036 | 45.8 | Liberal Democratic Party | Won |
| 2008 | Chittagong-14 | 63,412 | 26.9 | Liberal Democratic Party | 2nd |
| 2001 | Chittagong-13 | 70,016 | 53.8 | Bangladesh Nationalist Party | Won |
| 2001 | Chittagong-14 | 64,184 | 29.1 | Bangladesh Nationalist Party | 2nd |
| 1996 | Chittagong-13 | 62,323 | 61.8 | Bangladesh Nationalist Party | Won |
| 1996 | Chittagong-14 | 75,855 | 48.2 | Bangladesh Nationalist Party | Won |
| 1991 | Chittagong-13 | 52,072 | 59.5 | Bangladesh Nationalist Party | Won |

=== Presidential election ===
| Presidential election | Votes | Political party | Result |
|---|---|---|---|
| 2026 88data-sort-value="" style="background: var(--background-color-interactive, #ececec); color: var(--color-base, inherit); vertical-align: middle; text-align: center; " class="table-na" | —N/a | Liberal Democratic Party | —N/a | |

== Bangladesh Football Federation ==
Ahmad served as the president of the Bangladesh Football Federation (BFF) from 1992 until he resigned in late 1994.

== Publications ==
Books published by Oli Ahmad include:

- Revolution, Military Personnel and the War of Liberation in Bangladesh. Dhaka: Dizzy Publications, 2004.
- Battles That I Fought and Interviews of Liberation War Heroes. Dhaka: Annesha Prokashon, 2009.
