= Mokhtar Ahmad =

Bangladeshi politician

- মুখতার আহমদ

Member of Parliament from Chittagong-12
- In office 1988–1990
- Preceded by: Akhtaruzzaman Chowdhury Babu
- Succeeded by: Akhtaruzzaman Chowdhury Babu

Personal details
- Born: 31 August 1943 Chittagong District
- Died: 21 October 2006 (aged 63) Chittagong District
- Party: Jatiya Samajtantrik Dal
- Other political affiliations: Bangladesh Awami League

Mokhtar Ahmad (31 August 1943 – 21 October 2006) was a politician from the Chittagong District of Bangladesh and an elected a member of parliament for Chittagong-12. He was an organizer of the Liberation War of Bangladesh.

== Early life ==
Mokhtar Ahmad was born on 31 August 1943 in the village of Ratakhord Mozaffarabad in the Sadhanpur union of Banshkhali in Chittagong district.

== Career ==
Mokhtar joined politics in 1962. He was a freedom fighter. In Sector 1, he was the regional captain of Banshkhali, Anwara and Kutubdia.

He was defeated as the candidate of Jatiya Samajtantrik Dal from Chittagong-15 constituency in the first parliamentary elections of 1973. He was elected to parliament from Chittagong-12 as a Jatiya Samajtantrik Dal candidate in 1988.

In 1992 he rejoined the Bangladesh Awami League and served as a member of the Chittagong South District.

== Death ==
Mokhtar Ahmad died on 21 October 2006.
