= Mohammad Idris Shakur (Bangladeshi politician) =

Bangladeshi politician

Mohammad Idris

Member of Bangladesh Parliament
- In office 1973–1979
- Succeeded by: Shahadat Hossain Chowdhury

Personal details
- Party: Bangladesh Awami League

Mohammad Idris is a Bangladesh Awami League politician and a former member of parliament for Chittagong-12.

== Career ==
Idris was elected to parliament from Chittagong-12 as a Bangladesh Awami League candidate in 1973.
