= M. Abdul Latif =

Bangladeshi politician

- এম. আবদুল লতিফ
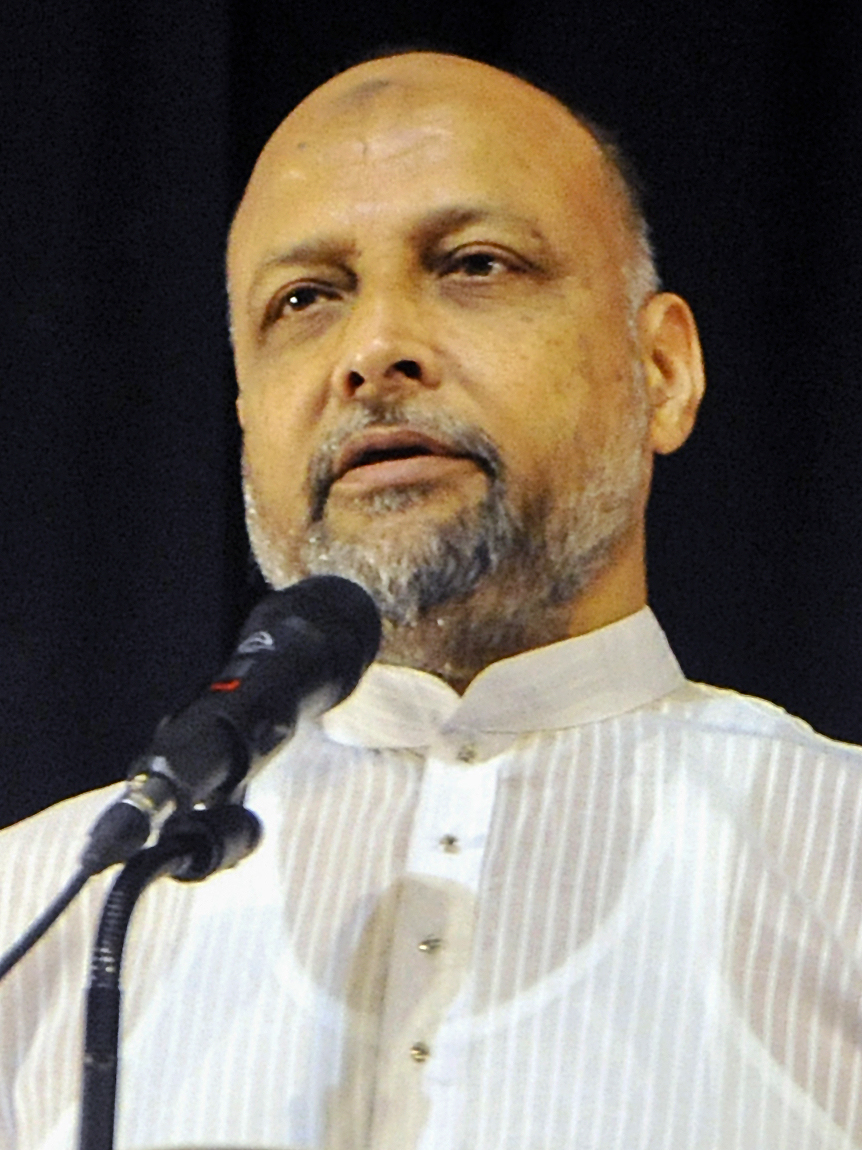
- Abdul Latif in 2016

Member of Parliament
- In office 20 December 2008 – 6 August 2024
- Preceded by: Gazi Shahjahan Jwel
- Succeeded by: Amir Khasru Mahmud Chowdhury
- Constituency: Chittagong-11

Personal details
- Born: March 10, 1955 (age 71) Chittagong, East Bengal, Dominion of Pakistan
- Party: Bangladesh Awami League
- Children: Omar Hajjaj
- Occupation: Businessman, politician

M. Abdul Latif is a Bangladesh Awami League politician and a former Jatiya Sangsad member representing the Chittagong-11 constituencies.

He is also a trade leader and a former president of the Chittagong Chamber of Commerce & Industry. He was board president of Chittagong based football club Chittagong Abahani.

== Early life ==
Latif was born on 10 March 1955. He has completed his Diploma in leather technology.

== Career ==
Latif first entered the political arena as a member of parliament from the constituency Chittagong-10 as an Awami League candidate. He received 164,591 votes while his nearest rival, Amir Khasru Mahmud Chowdhury of the Bangladesh Nationalist Party, received 141,946 votes.

Latif was re-elected to Parliament on 5 January 2014 from Chittagong-11 as an Awami League candidate. He received 283,169 votes while his nearest rival, Amir Khasru Mahmud Chowdhury of the Bangladesh Nationalist Party, received 141,946 votes. He was a member of the treasury bench in parliament.

Awami League activist Saifuddin Rabi sued Latif in February 2016 for allegedly putting distorted photos of Sheikh Mujibur Rahman on posters and called him a Bangladesh Jamaat-e-Islami infiltrator.

In January 2024, Latif was the Awami League candidate for Chittagong-11 while his son Omar Hajjaj stood against him as an independent candidate. The Bangladesh Election Commission summoned Mayor Rezaul Karim Chowdhury of Chattogram City Corporation for campaigning for Latif violating Code of Conduct for Parliamentary Elections. The Mayor had spoken at rally of the Chittagong City unit of Awami League along with other councilors of the city corporation. He won the election and was elected to the 12th parliament.

Latif was taken in custody of Bangladesh Army on 10 August 2024 after the fall of the Sheikh Hasina led Awami League government. The Army did so to protect him from the activists of Bangladesh Nationalist Party who were trying to attack him as he was returning from a mosque after Friday prayers. He was arrested on 17 August 2024. He was placed in three day remand. He received a head injury in prison and underwent surgery.
