= Akhtaruzzaman Chowdhury Babu =

Bangladeshi politician (1945 - 2012)

- আখতারুজ্জামান চৌধুরী বাবু

Member of the Bangladesh Parliament
- In office 25 January 2009 – 4 November 2012
- Preceded by: Sarwar Jamal Nizam
- Succeeded by: Saifuzzaman Chowdhury
- Constituency: Chittagong-13
- In office 5 March 1991 – 24 November 1995
- Preceded by: Mokhtar Ahmad
- Succeeded by: Sarwar Jamal Nizam
- Constituency: Chittagong-12
- In office 10 July 1986 – 6 December 1987
- Preceded by: Shahadat Hossain Chowdhury
- Succeeded by: Mokhtar Ahmad
- Constituency: Chittagong-12

Personal details
- Born: 1 May 1945 Chittagong, Bengal Province, British India
- Died: 4 November 2012 (aged 67) Mount Elizabeth Hospital, Singapore
- Party: Bangladesh Awami League
- Children: Saifuzzaman; Asifuzzaman; Nina

Akhtaruzzaman Chowdhury Babu (1 May 1945 – 4 November 2012) was a Bangladesh Awami League politician and a former Jatiya Sangsad member representing the Chittagong-12 constituency. He was awarded Independence Award in 2021 posthumously.

== Early life ==
Babu was born on 1 May 1945. He was elected to the East Pakistan provincial assembly from Anwara-West Patia in 1970. He was involved with Bangladesh Chhatra League as a student. During Bangladesh Liberation war, he organized Swadhin Bangla Betar Kendra in Chittagong.

== Role in 1971 War ==
Akhtaruzzaman Chowdhury Babu's Jupiter House at Patharghata was the camp for the freedom fighters in the city in 1971. Sitting there, the then local leaders took decision and disseminated the messages of the declaration of independence. Bangabandhu's liberty declaration was outreached by cyclostyle method from his Jupiter house after coming to Chattogram. Liberty declaration was delivered to everywhere including radio centers. Akhtaruzzaman Chowdhury Babu went to India and taken various responsibility of Bangladeshi immigrants. He was the committee member of Relief and Rehabilitation of Mujibnagar Government. During the middle of liberation war, he went to many regions of Europe and America for the development of world's people's opinions. He went to the London, UK and the US as the representative team member which was led by Abu Syed Chowdhury.

== Career ==
Babu was a famous politician and freedom fighter. On 1970, Akhtaruzzaman Chowdhury Babu became the regional council member (MPA); following on 1972, he became the member of Bangladesh constitutional member and helped composition of Constitution of Bangladesh. He was one of the signers of the constitution in 1972. He was elected to Parliament on in 1986, 1991, and 2008 from Chittagong-12 as a Bangladesh Awami League candidate. He was made the president of the South Chittagong District unit of the Awami League in 1977, a position held till his death. He was the founder and chairman of United Commercial Bank Ltd and Aramit Group. He served as the president of Federation of Bangladesh Chambers of Commerce and Industry. He was the chair of the Parliamentary Standing Committee on the Ministry of Textiles and Jute.

=== Entrepreneurship ===
- Aramit Limited, established in 1963 with the technical collaboration of Team S.A. Luxemburg and is the sole manufacture of cement.
- Aramit Cement Limited was incorporated on 19 August 1995 as a public limited company by shares and established with technical collaboration of a Chinese company for producing Ordinary Portland Cement
- Aramit Thai Aluminium Limited manufactures extruded Aluminium sections and profiles of various sizes and specifications using exclusive European State of the Art Technology.
- Aramit Steel Pipes Limited started manufacturing international standard stainless steel pipes first time in Bangladesh.
- Aramit Footwear
- Aramit Power Limited

== Controversies and criminal charges ==
Akhtaruzzaman was the principal accused in the murder case of businessman Humayun Zahir who was killed after a feud over the control of United Commercial Bank Limited board arose on 8 April 1993. He was ousted from the board on charges of defalcation and irregularities. He was later arrested but after being released on bail, he left the country. He returned to the country in 1996 after Awami League formed the government and Sheikh Hasina became prime minister. He was a close confidante of Hasina and was serving as the industry and commerce secretary of the Awami League then.

On 26 August 1999, he stormed the bank with around 40 armed cadres led by his son Saifuzzaman Chowdhury when a board meeting was underway. They forced the chairman Zafar Ahmed Chowdhury and the other board members of the bank to submit their resignation from the board at gunpoint and declared himself the chairman of the bank's board. It is alleged that his hired thugs assaulted the board members and stripped the chairman of the bank naked.

== Awards ==
He was awarded the "Independence Award 2021", the highest civilian award given by the government of Bangladesh, for his contribution in the war 1971, .

== Death ==
Babu died on 4 November 2012 from kidney complications at Mount Elizabeth Hospital in Singapore. The Muradpur-Lalkhan Bazar flyover has been named Akhtaruzzaman Chowdhury flyover in his memory.
