= Gazi Shahjahan Jwel =

Bangladeshi politician

Gazi Mohammed Shahjahan Jwel
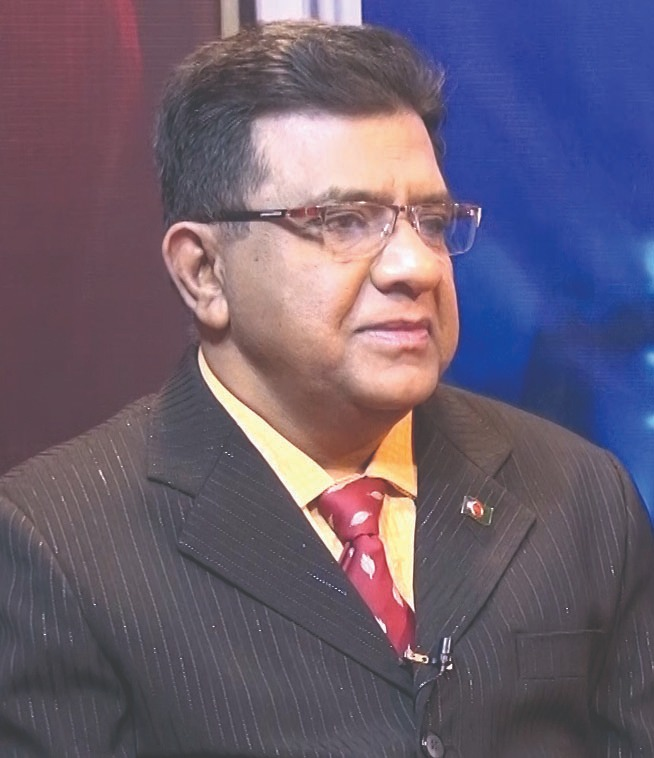

Member of Parliament
- In office 1996–2006
- Preceded by: Shah Newaz Chowdhury
- Succeeded by: M. Abdul Latif
- Constituency: Chittagong-11

Personal details
- Born: 1 February 1960 (age 66)
- Party: Bangladesh Nationalist Party

Gazi Mohammed Shahjahan Jwel (born 1 February 1960) is a Bangladesh Nationalist Party politician and a former member of parliament for Chittagong-11.

== Career ==
Shahjahan was elected to parliament from Chittagong-11 as a Bangladesh Nationalist Party candidate in 1996 and 2001.
