= Motaherul Islam Chowdhury =

Bangladeshi politician

- মোতাহেরুল ইসলাম চৌধুরী

Member of the Bangladesh Parliament for Chittagong-12
- In office 30 January 2024 – 6 August 2024
- Preceded by: Shamsul Haque Chowdhury

Personal details
- Born: 23 April 1949 (age 77)
- Party: Bangladesh Awami League
- Occupation: Politician

Motaherul Islam Chowdhury (born 23 April 1949) is a Bangladesh Awami League politician and a former Jatiya Sangsad member representing from the Chittagong-12 constituency.
