= Ambagan =

Coordinates: 25°21′N 89°22′E

Ambagan is a village located under Khulshi Thana in Chittagong, Bangladesh.
