= Sarwar Jamal Nizam =

Bangladeshi politician

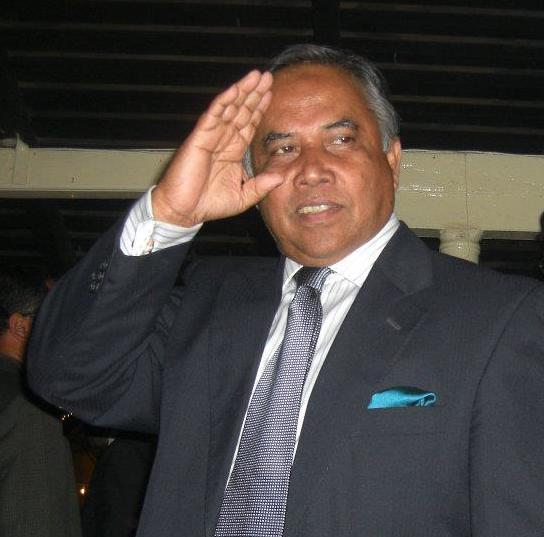

Member of Parliament
- Incumbent
- Assumed office 17 February 2026
- Preceded by: Saifuzzaman Chowdhury
- Constituency: Chittagong-13
- In office 14 July 1996 – 29 October 2006
- Preceded by: Oli Ahmad
- Succeeded by: Akhtaruzzaman Chowdhury Babu
- Constituency: Chittagong-13

Personal details
- Born: 1 January 1945 (age 81) Anowara, Chittagong, East Pakistan
- Party: Bangladesh Nationalist Party
- Relatives: Sarwar Jahan Nizam (brother)

Sarwar Jamal Nizam (born 1 January 1945) is a Bangladeshi politician and a member of parliament from Chittagong-13 of Bangladesh Nationalist Party (BNP).

== Career ==
Sarwar Jamal Nizam was first elected to parliament from Chittagong-13 as a Bangladesh Nationalist Party candidate in 1996.

Sarwar Jamal Nizam was elected President of Chittagong Chamber of Commerce and Industry(CCCI)in 1995 and 1996.

Nizam defeated Awami League leader Atatur Rahman Khan Kaiser 1996 in the parliamentary election. He again won from Chittagong-13 in 2001 defeating prominent Awami League leader Akhtaruzzaman Chowdhury Babu.

Sarwar Jamal Niam was a successful businessman in Steel, Ship-Breaking, Garments, Deep Sea Fishing and Financial Services.

Nizam is the brother of former Bangladesh Navy Chief, Admiral Sarwar Jahan Nizam.

Nizam was falsely accused and arrested in June 2007 by members of Rapid Action Battalion
