= Muradpur =

- Village
- Location in Punjab, India Muradpur (India)
- Coordinates: 31.4388641°N 75.6471536°E
- Country: India
- State: Punjab
- District: Jalandhar
- Tehsil: Jalandhar - I

Government
  - Type: Panchayat raj
  - Body: Gram panchayat

Area
  - Total: 90 ha (220 acres)

Population (2011)
  - Total: 275; 146/129 ♂/♀
  - Scheduled Castes: 131; 71/60 ♂/♀
  - Total Households: 53

Languages
  - Official: Punjabi
- Time zone: UTC+5:30 (IST)
- ISO 3166 code: IN-PB
- Vehicle registration: PB-08
- Website: jalandhar.gov.in

Muradpur is a village in Jalandhar - I in Jalandhar district of Punjab State, India. It is located 23 kilometres (14 mi) from district headquarter. The village is administrated by Sarpanch an elected representative of the village.

== Demography ==
As of 2011, the village has a total number of 53 houses and a population of 275 of which 146 are males while 129 are females. According to the report published by Census India in 2011, out of the total population of the village 131 people are from Schedule Caste and the village does not have any Schedule Tribe population so far.

== See also ==
- List of villages in India
