= Sirajul Islam Chowdhury (politician) =

Bangladeshi politician

Member of Bangladesh Parliament
- In office 1988–1990

Personal details
- Party: Jatiya Party (Ershad) Bangladesh Nationalist Party Bangladesh Jatiotabadi Chatradal

Sirajul Islam Chowdhury (Bengali: সিরাজুল ইসলাম চৌধুরী) is a Jatiya Party (Ershad) politician, former student activist, social worker, and a former member of parliament for Chittagong-11.

== Career ==
Chowdhury was a revolutionary student activist of Chittagong who led the protests against the Pakistani ruling elite in the sixties along with many others. After the War of Independence, he cofounded Bangladesh Jatiotabadi Chatradal and was the founding convenor of Chittagong University Bangladesh Jatiotabadi Chatradal Unit.

Chowdhury is also a social reformer and co-founded the non-governmental organization NOWZUWAN in 1977. NOWZUWAN was one of the three non-government organisations to sign 'Grant Contracts' with Japanese Ambassador ITO Naoki under the Grassroots Human Security Projects (GGHSP) in March 2022.

Chowdhury was elected to parliament from Chittagong-11 as a Jatiya Party candidate in 1988. He's a member of the Jatiya Party and advisory council. He was among 20 candidates who boycotted the 2014 parliamentary elections during the early hours, after alleging vote rigging and election interferences by agents of a rival candidate.
