= Bangladesh Islami Front =

Far-right political party in Bangladesh

Bangladesh Islami Front বাংলাদেশ ইসলামী ফ্রন্ট
- Chairman: M. A. Matin
- Secretary-General: S. U. M Abdus Samad
- Founded: 21 December 1990; 35 years ago
- Headquarters: 205/5 Fakirapool, Al-Bashir Plaza (5th Floor), Kalvart Road, Dhaka-1000
- Student wing: Bangladesh Islami Chattra Sena
- Political position: Far-right
- Seats in the Jatiya Sangshad: 0 / 300

Election symbol
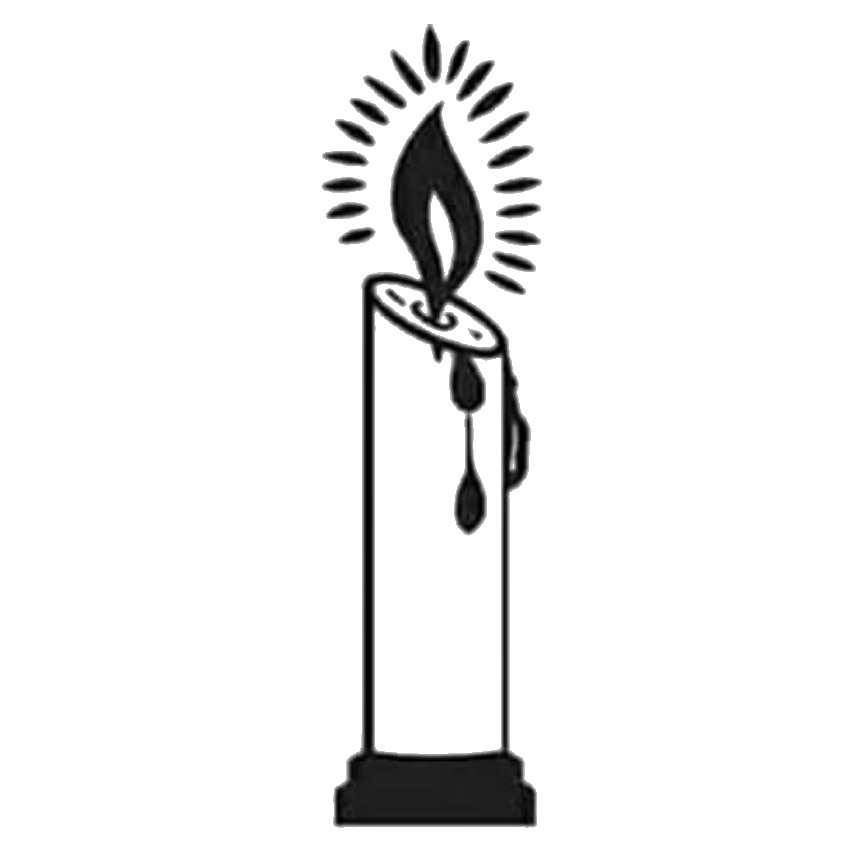

Party flag
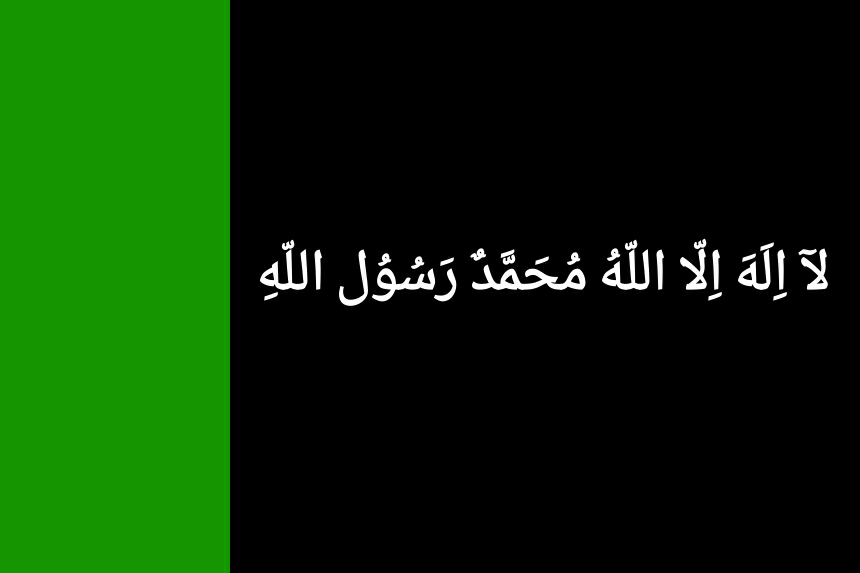

The Bangladesh Islami Front (Bengali: বাংলাদেশ ইসলামী ফ্রন্ট) is a far-right Islamist political party in Bangladesh. In the 2001 parliamentary election, the party fielded 16 candidates. Together, they gathered 29,002 votes (0.05% of the national vote), but the party won no seats in the Jatiya Sangsad. The party's student wing is Bangladesh Islami Chattra Sena.

== History ==
The party was founded on 21 December 1990.

On 27 August 2014, presidium member Nurul Islam Farooqi, was murdered following a home invasion. In August, 2014, Islami Chhatra Sena chief Muhammad Nurul Haq Chisty announced at a press conference that a half-day strike across Bangladesh would be observed, and called for the arrest and trial of Farooqi's killer. The student party formed a human chain on the Dhaka-Sylhet Highway's Ashuganj Goalchattor area on 25 August 2015, demanding an exceptional punishment for Farooqi's killer.

The Bangladesh Islami Front entered into the Jatiya Party-led Sammilita Jatiya Jote (United National Alliance) in 2017.

In the 2024 Bangladeshi general election, the party fielded candidates independently across 37 constituencies, securing 77,631 votes (0.16% of the national vote). Following the election, party leadership publicly opposed the opposition-backed "India Out" boycott campaign and expressed support for Sheikh Hasina as well as closer bilateral ties between Dhaka and New Delhi.

== Election results ==
=== Jatiya Sangsad elections ===
Election	Party leader	Votes	%	Seats	+/–	Position	Outcome
1991	M. A. Matin	24,310	0.09%	0 / 300	New	25th	Extra-parliamentary
Feb 1996	M. A. Matin	Boycotted		0 / 300	0	—N/a	Extra-parliamentary
Jun 1996	M. A. Matin	23,696	0.06%	0 / 300	0	▲16th	Extra-parliamentary
2001	M. A. Matin	30,761	0.06%	0 / 300	0	▲12th	Extra-parliamentary
2008	M. A. Matin	31,785	0.05%	0 / 300	0	▼20th	Extra-parliamentary
2014	M. A. Matin	2,585	0.02%	0 / 300	0	▲11th	Extra-parliamentary
2018	M. A. Matin	60,372	0.07%	0 / 300	0	▼16th	Extra-parliamentary
2024	M. A. Matin	77,631	0.16%	0 / 300	0		Extra-parliamentary
2026	M. A. Matin	335,011	0.45%	0 / 300	0	12th	Extra-parliamentary

== See also ==
- List of Islamic political parties
