= Saifuzzaman Chowdhury =

Bangladeshi politician (born 1969)

- সাইফুজ্জামান চৌধুরী
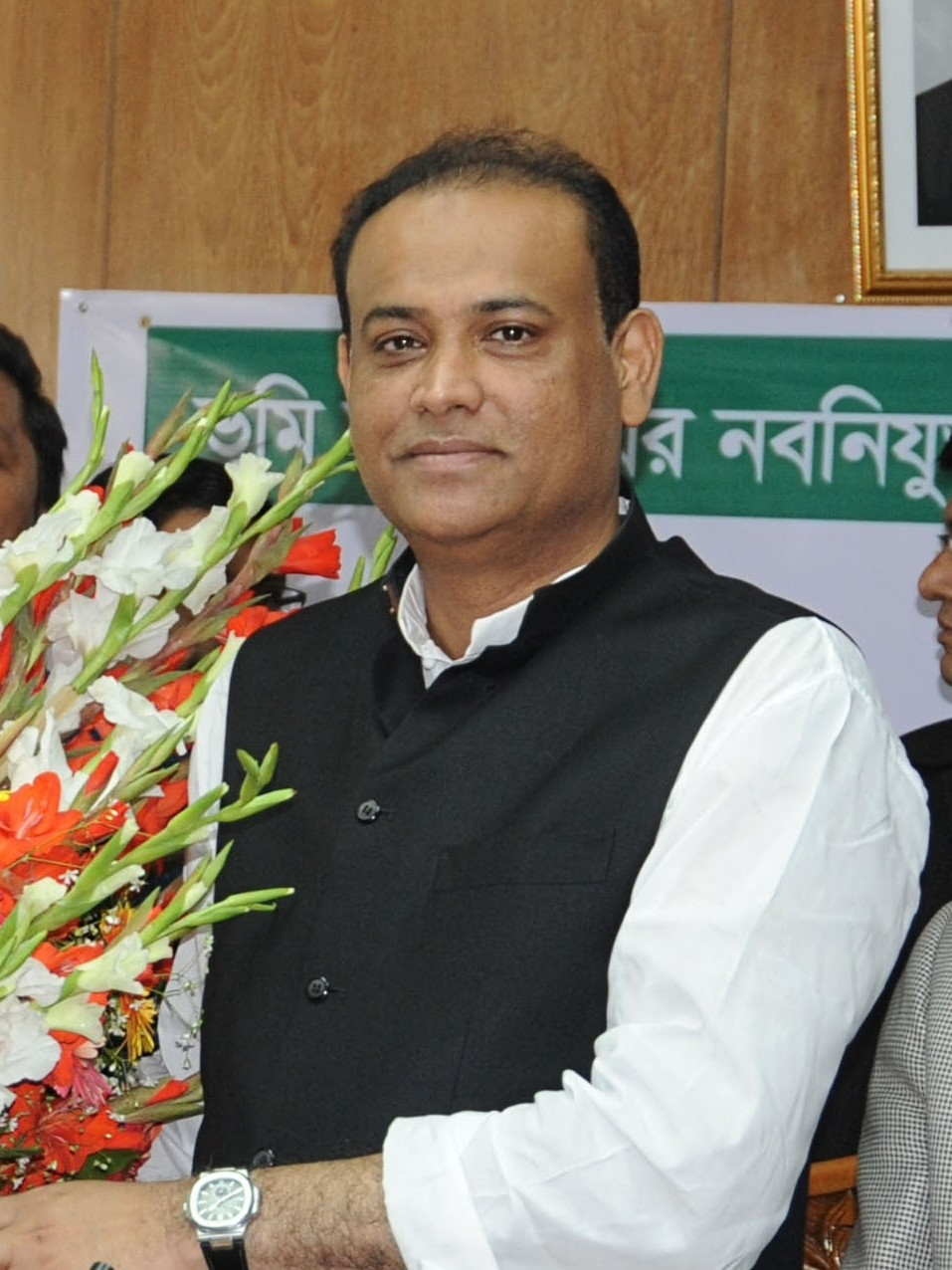
- Chowdhury in 2019

Member of Parliament
- In office 8 January 2013 – 6 August 2024
- Preceded by: Akhtaruzzaman Chowdhury Babu
- Succeeded by: Sarwar Jamal Nizam
- Constituency: Chittagong-13

Minister of Land
- In office 7 January 2019 – 11 January 2024
- Prime Minister: Sheikh Hasina
- Preceded by: Shamsur Rahman Sherif
- Succeeded by: Narayon Chandra Chanda

Minister of State for Land
- In office 12 January 2014 – 7 January 2019
- Prime Minister: Sheikh Hasina
- Preceded by: Mostafizur Rahman
- Succeeded by: Kayser Kamal

Personal details
- Born: 18 February 1969 (age 57) Chittagong, East Pakistan, Pakistan
- Party: Bangladesh Awami League
- Spouse: Rukhmila Zaman
- Parent: Akhtaruzzaman Chowdhury Babu (father)

Saifuzzaman Chowdhury Javed (born 18 February 1969) is a Bangladesh Awami League politician and a former Jatiya Sangsad member representing the Chittagong-13 constituencies. He served as the Minister of Land at the Fourth Hasina ministry during 2019–2024. Chowdhury has been embroiled in major controversies, including the forceful takeover of United Commercial Bank in 1999 and allegations of amassing an undisclosed overseas property empire worth hundreds of millions of dollars.

== Early life ==
Saifuzzaman Chowdhury was born on 18 February 1969 in Anwara, Chattogram. His father was freedom fighter and senior Awami League leader Akhtaruzzaman Chowdhury Babu and his mother was Noor Nahar Jaman. His wife, Rukhmila Zaman, was the chairperson of United Commercial Bank.

== Career ==
Chowdhury was elected to the parliament from Chittagong-13 in 2014. He is a member of the executive committee of United Commercial bank and Chairman of the Arameet group. He was thrice elected President of Chittagong Chamber of Commerce.

In 2020, Chowdhury received the UN Public Service award for digitalising services of the Ministry of Land.

On 6 August 2024, at the aftermath of 2024 non-cooperation movement, Chowdhury lost his membership at the 12th Jatiya Sangsad. Soon after, on 12 August, Bangladesh Financial Intelligence Unit (BFIU) ordered all banks to freeze the accounts of Chowdhury and his wife, Rukhmila Zaman.

== Controversy ==
Chowdhury, under the leadership of his father Akhtaruzzaman Chowdhury Babu forced into the premise of United Commercial Bank with 50 to 60 armed cadres in 1999 and captured the leadership of the bank putting the directors at gunpoint.

Chowdhury has at least 260 properties in the United Kingdom for which he has paid at least GBP 134.76 million or Tk 1,888 crore, according to The Daily Star's calculation from company filings publicly available on UK government websites. He has also at least 537 mortgages against properties in the UK. A vast majority of these properties are in London. However, his tax returns, submitted along with his affidavit to the Election Commission, states that he has no foreign income. The affidavit says his annual income from business is only Tk 1.35 lakh. Although the affidavit must also reveal the annual income of dependents—like wife and children—the minister left that blank. In addition, his affidavit says that he and his wife jointly hold shares and debentures of only Tk 17.90 crore, about a hundred times less than his total known investment in UK properties. An investigative report titled ‘The Minister’s Millions’ was published in September 2024. Al Jazeera’s investigative team ‘I Unit’ led by Zulkarnain Saer Khan ran the investigation. It has revealed that Chowdhury has built a property empire worth at least $675 million in London, 72 of which in Tower Hamlets, Dubai and New York none of which were declared in his tax returns.

On 12 June 2025, Britain’s National Crime Agency (NCA) froze more than 300 properties in the United Kingdom linked to Chowdhury. The NCA stated that it had obtained High Court orders on 5 June 2025 to freeze 342 properties with a combined purchase price of approximately £185 million.
