= Electoral history of Mirza Fakhrul Islam Alamgir =

This is a summary of the electoral history of Mirza Fakhrul Islam Alamgir, a Bangladeshi politician who is serving as the president of Bangladesh since 2026. Alamgir has won municipal election once, parliamentary election 4 times, and indirect presidential election once. He has lost 4 times in parliamentary elections also.

Alamgir started his electoral career for public offices through contesting in the Thakurgaon municipal election in 1988. Held under Hussain Muhammad Ershad's dictatorship and boycotted by most political parties, Alamgir won the municipal chairmanship as an independent candidate. In the early-1990s, he joined the Bangladesh Nationalist Party and contested in most parliamentary elections thereafter. He started with losing in 1991, and then won in a largely boycotted election in February 1996 only to become a member of parliament (MP) for 12 days. He lost again in June 1996, then won in 2001, and then lost again in 2008. BNP boycotted the 1997 by-election in his home seat of Thakurgaon-1. He became BNP's acting general secretary in 2011 and was elected uncontested for the position in the party's 2016 national council. He therefore became the party's effective leader in the country with Khaleda Zia being jailed and Tarique Rahman being in exile in London. Under his tenure, BNP boycotted the 2014 general election, then contested in the controversial 2018 election, both held under the premiership of Sheikh Hasina. In 2018, he lost from his home seat Thakurgaon-1 but won BNP stronghold Bogra-6 by a huge landslide, being among the only 6 BNP candidates to win. Although the other 5 eventually took oath, Alamgir restrained, triggering a by-election which was won by BNP's Golam Mohammad Siraj. BNP then boycotted the 2024 general election.

After the resignation of Sheikh Hasina facilitated by the July Uprising in 2024, general elections were held in 2026 under an interim government, from which the Awami League was barred. BNP won a landslide, with Alamgir winning from his Thakurgaon-1 seat for the third time. After the subsequent resignation of Mohammed Shahabuddin, presidential election was called. Alamgir won the indirect parliamentary election with BNP being in supermajority and the constitution barring floor-crossing. He defeated 11 Party Unity candidate Oli Ahmad in the country's first contested presidential election in 35 years.

== Summary ==
=== Presidential elections ===
Year	Party	Votes	%	Result
2026	Bangladesh Nationalist Party	255	74.34%	Won

=== Jatiya Sangsad elections ===
Year	Constituency	Party	Votes	%	Result
1991	Thakurgaon-1	Bangladesh Nationalist Party	36,406	25.13%	Lost
Feb 1996	Thakurgaon-1	Bangladesh Nationalist Party			Won
Jun 1996	Thakurgaon-1	Bangladesh Nationalist Party	58,369	31.97%	Lost
2001	Thakurgaon-1	Bangladesh Nationalist Party	134,910	54.15%	Won
2008	Thakurgaon-1	Bangladesh Nationalist Party	120,411	39.88%	Lost
2018	Thakurgaon-1	Bangladesh Nationalist Party	128,080	35.84%	Lost
2018	Bogra-6	Bangladesh Nationalist Party	207,025	81.20%	Won
2026	Thakurgaon-1	Bangladesh Nationalist Party	238,836	62.23%	Won

== Detailed results ==
=== Presidential elections ===
Candidate	Party	Votes	%
Mirza Fakhrul Islam Alamgir	Bangladesh Nationalist Party	255	74.34
Oli Ahmad	Liberal Democratic Party	88	25.66
Total		343	100.00
Valid votes		343	100.00
Invalid/blank votes		0	0.00
Total votes		343	100.00
Registered voters/turnout		349	98.28

=== Parliamentary elections ===
==== 1991 ====
General Election 1991: 3 Thakurgaon-1 (Thakurgaon Sadar Upazila less Begunbari Union)
Party	Symbol	Candidate	Votes	%	±pp
AL	Boat	Md. Khademul Islam	57,535	39.72	N/A
BNP	Sheaf of paddy	Mirza Fakhrul Islam Alamgir	36,406	25.13	N/A
Jamaat	Scale	Mohammad Rafiqul Islam	26,800	18.50	N/A
JaPa	Plough	Rezwanul Haque Idu Chowdhury	21,051	14.53	▼N/A
Zaker Party	Rose	Md. Manzur Rahman Chowdhury	1,150	0.79	N/A
BAKSAL	Sickle	Rafiqul Islam	832	0.57	N/A
JSD (Rab)	Lotus	Md. Mansur Ali	648	0.45	N/A
IND	N/A	Md. Ashraful Islam Sobuj	428	0.30	N/A
Total			144,850	100.0	N/A
Majority			57,535	14.59	N/A
Valid votes			144,850	98.75	N/A
Invalid votes			1,821	1.24	N/A
Tendered votes			6	0.00	N/A
Total votes			146,677	100.0	N/A
Registered voters/turnout			218,981	66.98	N/A
Reported centres			90	100.0	N/A
Suspended centres			0	0.00	N/A
Total centres			90	100.0	N/A
Awami League gain from ▌Jatiya Party					
Mirza Fakhrul Islam Alamgir from BNP lost in second-place					

==== February 1996 ====
On 15 February 1996, general elections were held under the Khaleda Zia's BNP-led government, which was boycotted by the Awami League, Jatiya Party, Jamaat-e-Islami, and most other political parties. Alamgir contested from Thakurgaon-1 again and won a parliamentary election for the first time.

==== June 1996 ====
General Election June 1996: 3 Thakurgaon-1 (Thakurgaon Sadar P.S.)
Party	Symbol	Candidate	Votes	%	±pp
AL	Boat	Md. Khademul Islam	62,709	34.35	N/A
BNP	Sheaf of paddy	Mirza Fakhrul Islam Alamgir	58,369	31.97	▼N/A
JaPa	Plough	Md. Nurul Haque	42,609	23.34	N/A
Jamaat	Scale	Mohammad Rafiqul Islam	17,242	9.44	N/A
Zaker Party	Rose	Md. Jaherul Haque Chowdhury	923	0.51	N/A
CPB	Sickle	Syed Merajul Hossain Chowdhury	716	0.39	N/A
Total			182,568	100.0	N/A
Majority			4,340	2.38	N/A
Valid votes			182,568	98.93	N/A
Invalid votes			1,975	1.07	N/A
Total votes			184,543	100.0	N/A
Registered voters/turnout			235,750	78.28	N/A
Reported centres			111	100.0	N/A
Suspended centres			0	0.00	N/A
Total centres			111	100.0	N/A
Awami League gain from ▌BNP					
Mirza Fakhrul Islam Alamgir from BNP lost in second-place					

==== 2001 ====
General Election 2001: 3 Thakurgaon-1 (Thakurgaon Sadar Upazila)
Party	Alliance	Symbol	Candidate	Votes	%	±pp
BNP	4 Parties	Sheaf of paddy	Mirza Fakhrul Islam Alamgir	134,910	54.15	N/A
AL	N/A	Boat	Ramesh Chandra Sen	96,948	38.91	▼26.74
JaPa	IJOF	Plough	Md. Noore Alam Chowdhury	16,647	6.68	▼26.77
CPB	11 Parties	Sickle	Syed Merajul Hossain Chowdhury	639	0.26	N/A
Total				249,144	100.0	N/A
Majority				37,962	15.24	▼16.97
Valid votes				249,144	99.27	▲0.15
Invalid votes				1,835	0.73	▼0.15
Total votes				250,979	100.0	N/A
Registered voters/turnout				286,317	87.66	▲36.68
Reported centres				120	100.0	N/A
Suspended centres				0	0.00	N/A
Total centres				120	100.0	▲9 C
BNP gain from ▌Awami League						
Mirza Fakhrul Islam Alamgir from BNP won in first-place.						

==== 2008 ====
General Election 2008: 3 Thakurgaon-1 (Thakurgaon Sadar Upazila)
Party	Alliance	Symbol	Candidate	Votes	%	±pp
AL	Grand Alliance	Boat	Ramesh Chandra Sen	177,101	58.65	▲19.74
BNP	4 Party Unity	Sheaf of paddy	Mirza Fakhrul Islam Alamgir	120,411	39.88	▼14.27
IAB	IAB+BKA	Handfan	Md. A. Majid	2,444	0.81	N/A
NOTA		No-vote		1,990	0.66	N/A
Total				301,946	100.0	N/A
Majority				56,690	18.77	▲3.53
Valid votes				301,946	99.15	▼0.12
Invalid votes				2,598	0.85	▲0.12
Total votes				304,544	100.0	N/A
Registered voters/turnout				327,677	92.94	▲5.28
Reported centres				157	100.0	N/A
Suspended centres				0	0.00	N/A
Total centres				157	100.0	▲37 C
Awami League gain from ▌BNP						
Mirza Fakhrul Islam Alamgir from BNP lost in second-place						

== See also ==
- Electoral history of Mohammad Abdul Hamid
- Electoral history of Khaleda Zia
- Electoral history of Hussain Muhammad Ershad
