= Thakurgaon (disambiguation) =

Thakurgaon is a city in Bangladesh and the headquarters of Thakurgaon District.

Thakurgaon may also refer to:

== Bangladesh ==
- Thakurgaon District
  - Thakurgaon Stadium
  - Thakurgaon Sadar Upazila
  - Thakurgaon STOLport airport
- Thakurgaon-1, a parliamentary constituency
- Thakurgaon-2, a parliamentary constituency
- Thakurgaon-3, a parliamentary constituency

== India ==
- Thakurgaon, India, a village

== Others ==
- Ginjo Thakurgaon, a village in India
