= Dabirul Islam =

Bangladeshi politician (1948–2026)

- দবিরুল ইসলাম

Member of Parliament for Thakurgaon-2
- In office 14 July 1996 – 10 January 2024
- Preceded by: Md. Julfiker Murtuja Chowdhury
- Succeeded by: Mazharul Islam Suzon
- In office 5 March 1991 – 24 November 1995
- Preceded by: Mirza Ruhul Amin
- In office 10 July 1986 – 6 December 1987
- Preceded by: Position created

Personal details
- Born: 29 September 1948
- Died: 28 May 2026 (aged 77) Dhaka, Bangladesh
- Party: Bangladesh Awami League

Dabirul Islam (29 September 1948 – 28 May 2026) was a Bangladesh Awami League politician who was a Jatiya Sangsad member representing the Thakurgaon-2 constituency from 1996, during 1991–1996 and 1986–1988. He was chairman of the Standing Committee on Ministry of Chittagong Hill Tracts Affairs. He was a seven-term Jatiya Sangsad member representing the Thakurgaon-2 constituency.

Islam was elected to parliament from Thakurgaon-2 as a Bangladesh Awami League candidate. He was a seven-term member of parliament elected from Thakurgaon-2. In the northern part of Bangladesh, no one has won more than six times in elections, but Dabirul Islam has set an example by winning 7 times. He was elected twice as a member of parliament from the Communist Party and then five times from the Awami League.

== Early life ==
Islam was born on 29 September 1948 in Barobari village, Baliadangi Upazila, Thakurgaon District, East Bengal, Pakistan. He was a member of the Bangladesh Students’ Union as a student. He fought in the Bangladesh Liberation War. He joined the Communist Party of Bangladesh after the Independence of Bangladesh in 1971.

== Career ==
Islam was elected to parliament from Thakurgaon-2 as a candidate of the 15 party alliance led by Awami League in 1986. He was re-elected to parliament in 1991. He was re-elected to parliament in subsequent elections in 1996, 2001, 2008, 2014 and 2018 as a candidate of the Awami League.

Islam served as the chairman of the Standing Committee on Ministry of Housing and Public Works, Standing Committee on Ministry of Social Welfare and Standing Committee on Ministry of Science and Technology.

Islam owned Ranbag Islami Tea Estate Company. He was the president of the Thakurgaon District Awami League.

Islam was accused of trying to forcibly occupy the properties of minority Hindu groups near his tea estate. Over 10 Hindu people were injured in attacks by his men. The police were accused of not registering cases against him because his party is in power. His son was accused of leading the attacks to occupy land belonging to Hindu families in Baliadangi, Thakurgaon, the area borders India. Reports of Bangladesh intelligence agencies, local police and minority advocacy group Bangladesh Hindu Buddhist Christian Unity Council found involvement of Islam in the land grabbing.

== Personal life ==
Islam's son, Mazharul Islam Suzon, is a former member of parliament.

== Detention and death ==
After the fall of the Sheikh Hasina-led Awami League government, Islam was detained from Thakurgaon Sadar upazila in October 2024. A number of cases were filed against him. He was held in a case filed by an activist of the Bangladesh Nationalist Party. His assets were frozen by a court order following a petition of the Anti-Corruption Commission in September 2025. He was held in pre-trial detention till May 2026 when he was released on bail. After release he was admitted to a hospital in Dhaka for treatment. Islam died in Dhaka on 28 May 2026, at the age of 77. Former Prime Minister Sheikh Hasina expressed concern over his treatment during detention and also questioned why his son, Mazharul Islam Sujan, was not granted bail in the same case. She blamed his death on the Muhammad Yunus led interim government. She noted that another Awami League member of parliament from Thakurgaon, Ramesh Chandra Sen, had died in February in Dinajpur District Jail in February.
