= QABM Rahman =

Bangladeshi government official (1935–2026)

- কিউ এ বি এম রহমান
- Born: 1 February 1935; Faridpur, Bengal Presidency, British India
- Died: 1 November 2026 (aged 91)
- Occupation: Civil servant
- Awards: Ekushey Padak (2022)

QABM Rahman (1 February 1935 – 1 November 2026) was a Bangladeshi government official. He was first the director and later the director general of Bangladesh Inland Water Transport Authority. Rahman was the first chairman and managing director of Bangladesh Shipping Corporation.

The Bangladesh government awarded him the Ekushey Padak in 2022 for his important contribution in the war of liberation.

== Career ==
Rahman joined the then British-India Shipping as a cadet after pre-sea training at HMS Conway. After receiving the Master Mariner's Certificate, Mohammadi returned to the then Pakistan under the command of Al-Ahmadi of the Shipping Company. He then joined EPSC as marine superintendent. He later served as IWTA secretary and planning director. He went to India in early 1971 to join the Mujibnagar government. After the independence of Bangladesh he performed some important duties.

On 18 December 1971, eight top officials, including Rahman were sent from Calcutta to Dhaka as representatives of the Mujibnagar Government, with the goal to establish government control over important installations. That was the first civil administration of the free Bangladesh government. Acting President Syed Nazrul Islam was represented by Abul Fateh. Cabinet Secretary Ruhul Quddus, first Inspector General of Police Abdul Khaleq, Establishment Secretary M Nurul Quader, Information and Broadcasting Secretary Anwarul Haque Khan, Finance Secretary K A Zaman and Director Civil Aviation Wing Commander S. R. Mirza were present.

He was first the director and later the director general of Bangladesh Inland Water Transport Authority. On his initiative Bangladesh Shipping Corporation was formed on 5 March 1972 and he served as the first chairman and managing director of Bangladesh Shipping Corporation. For some time he ran a ship-chartering business with some close associates.

== Death ==
Rahman died on the morning of 1 November 2026, at the age of 91.

== Awards ==
- Ekushey Padak (2022)
- Nautical Institute Crest
