= Abdus Salam (Thakurgaon politician) =

Bangladesh Nationalist Party politician

Md. Abdus Salam
- মোঃ আব্দুস সালাম

Member of Parliament
- Incumbent
- Assumed office 17 February 2026
- Preceded by: Mazharul Islam Suzon
- Constituency: Thakurgaon-2

Personal details
- Party: Bangladesh Nationalist Party
- Occupation: Politician

Md. Abdus Salam is a Bangladesh Nationalist Party politician and elected member of Parliament from Thakurgaon-2.
