= Mirza Fakhrul Islam Alamgir =

President of Bangladesh since 2026

- মির্জা ফখরুল ইসলাম আলমগীর
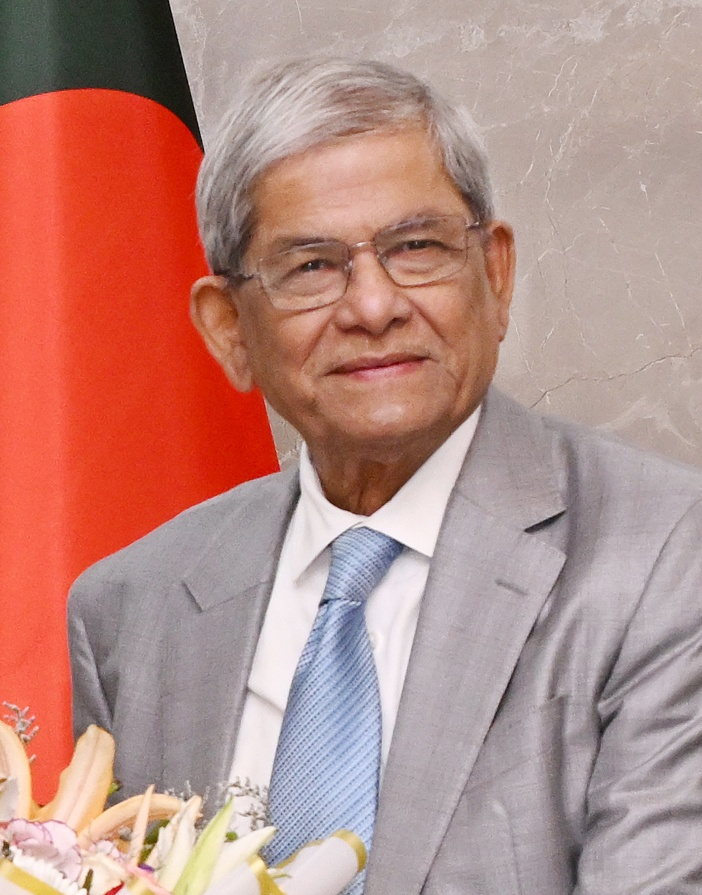
- Alamgir in 2026

President of Bangladesh
- Incumbent
- Assumed office 21 August 2026
- Prime Minister: Tarique Rahman
- Preceded by: Mohammed Shahabuddin; Hafiz Uddin Ahmad (acting)

Minister of Local Government, Rural Development and Co-operatives
- In office 17 February 2026 – 20 August 2026
- President: Mohammed Shahabuddin; Hafiz Uddin Ahmad (acting)
- Prime Minister: Tarique Rahman
- Preceded by: Adilur Rahman Khan
- Succeeded by: Abdul Moyeen Khan

Minister of Civil Aviation and Tourism
- In office 18 November 2005 – 27 October 2006
- Preceded by: Mir Mohammad Nasiruddin
- Succeeded by: M. A. Matin

Minister of Agriculture
- In office 10 October 2001 – 17 November 2005
- Preceded by: A. Z. A. Nasiruddin
- Succeeded by: Iqbal Hassan Mahmood

Member of the Bangladesh Parliament for Thakurgaon-1
- In office 17 February 2026 – 20 August 2026
- Preceded by: Ramesh Chandra Sen
- Succeeded by: Mirza Faisal Amin
- In office 10 October 2001 – 27 October 2006
- Preceded by: Ramesh Chandra Sen
- Succeeded by: Ramesh Chandra Sen
- In office 15 February 1996 – 30 March 1996
- Preceded by: Khademul Islam
- Succeeded by: Khademul Islam

8th Secretary General of the Bangladesh Nationalist Party
- In office 20 March 2011 – 13 August 2026
- Chairperson: Khaleda Zia; Tarique Rahman
- Preceded by: Khandaker Delwar Hossain
- Succeeded by: Ruhul Kabir Rizvi (acting)

Personal details
- Born: 26 January 1948 (age 78) Thakurgaon, East Bengal, Dominion of Pakistan
- Party: Bangladesh Nationalist Party
- Spouse: Rahat Ara Begum
- Relations: Mirza Faisal Amin (brother); Mirza Ghulam Hafiz (uncle)
- Children: 2
- Parent: Mirza Ruhul Amin (father)
- Education: University of Dhaka (BA, MA); Dhaka College (HSC)

Mirza Fakhrul Islam Alamgir (Note: Bengali: মির্জা ফখরুল ইসলাম আলমগীর, romanized: Mirjā Phôkhrul Islām Ālômgīr) (born 26 January 1948) is a Bangladeshi politician and educator who has served as the president of Bangladesh since August 2026.

A senior member of the Bangladesh Nationalist Party, he served twice as member of parliament for the Thakurgaon-1 constituency and held cabinet posts as Minister of State for Agriculture and Civil Aviation and Tourism from 2001 to 2006 and as Minister of Local Government, Rural Development and Co-operatives in his second term. He was also the party's longest-serving secretary general, a post he resigned from upon accepting BNP's presidential nomination.

== Early life ==
Alamgir was born on 26 January 1948 in Thakurgaon, East Bengal, Dominion of Pakistan (present-day Bangladesh) to Mirza Ruhul Amin, a former member of parliament and Mirza Fatima Amin, a homemaker. He completed his SSC from Thakurgaon Government Boys' High School. He completed his HSC from Dhaka College and graduation from University of Dhaka. His ancestral home is in Mirzapur Village of Atwari Upazila in Panchagarh District.

== Political career ==
=== Student politics ===
Alamgir was active in student politics at Dhaka University. He was a member of the then East Pakistan Students Union (EPSU), now known as Bangladesh Students Union, and was elected as the secretary general of the organization's SM Hall unit in the university. Alamgir rose through the ranks of EPSU and, at the height of the 1969 uprising against the Ayub Khan administration, he was elected as the organization's Dhaka University president.

=== Teaching and other government positions ===
In 1972, Alamgir became a teacher of economics at Dhaka College.

Among other government responsibilities, Alamgir served in the administration of President Ziaur Rahman. He worked as a secretary of Deputy Prime Minister S.A. Bari, and State Minister Amirul Islam Kalam until the latter resigned in 1982. Following this, Alamgir taught economics at Thakurgaon Govt. College and also worked for the Bangladesh government's Directorate of Inspection and Audit as an auditor and UNESCO until 1986.

=== Entry into politics ===
In 1986, with the municipal polls ahead, Alamgir resigned from his government post. He ran for chairman in Thakurgaon municipality in the 1988 municipal elections as an independent candidate, and won.

Alamgir joined Bangladesh Nationalist Party amid the countrywide uprising to topple the military regime of Gen. Hussain Muhammad Ershad in the early 1990s. In 1992, Alamgir was nominated as president of the BNP's Thakurgaon District unit.

=== Member of parliament and ministries ===
Alamgir ran in the 5th parliamentary election in 1991 from Thakurgaon-1 constituency on the Bangladesh Nationalist Party ticket but lost to Awami League candidate Khademul Islam. He lost to another Awami League candidate again in the 7th parliamentary election in 1996, but this time with a very narrow margin: 51%–47%.

In the 8th parliamentary election in 2001, as a Bangladesh Nationalist Party candidate, Alamgir beat Awami League candidate Ramesh Chandra Sen by 37,962 votes, garnering 134,910 votes.

The government newly formed by Alamgir's BNP party appointed him Minister of State in charge of the Ministry of Agriculture. A cabinet reshuffle later named him Minister of State in charge of the Ministry of Civil Aviation and Tourism, where he served until the BNP government left office in October 2006.

Alamgir ran again in the 9th parliamentary election in 2008, losing marginally to the Awami League candidate, he previously beat, Ramesh Chandra Sen.

In the 2018 Bangladeshi general election, he was nominated by the Bangladesh Nationalist Party for both the Thakurgaon-1 and Bogra-6 constituencies. He lost his home constituency of Thakurgaon-1 (Sadar) to Awami League candidate Ramesh Chandra Sen, but won Bogra-6 by a landslide, defeating his nearest rival, Jatiya Party candidate Nurul Islam Omar of the Grand Alliance. He subsequently declined to take the oath of office as part of his party's strategy, prompting the Election Commission to declare the seat vacant and hold a by-election.

Following the fall of the Hasina regime in the July Uprising of 2024, he was elected to parliament from the Thakurgaon-1 constituency in the 2026 Bangladeshi general election, held on 12 February, defeating Delawar Hossain, the Bangladesh Jamaat-e-Islami candidate of the 11 Party Alliance, by approximately 98,000 votes.

On 17 February, he was sworn in as a member of parliament and later that afternoon took oath as Ministry of Local Government, Rural Development and Co-operatives. It was his first appointment as a full minister, having previously served as a state minister in two ministries.

=== 5th BNP Council ===
The 5th National Council of BNP in December 2008 named Alamgir senior joint secretary general, a post previously held by Tarique Rahman.

Alamgir became well known in Bangladesh for his frequent appearance in the media as the BNP's spokesperson, particularly as leader of the opposition to the Awami League-led government that took office in January 2009.

=== BNP's secretary general ===
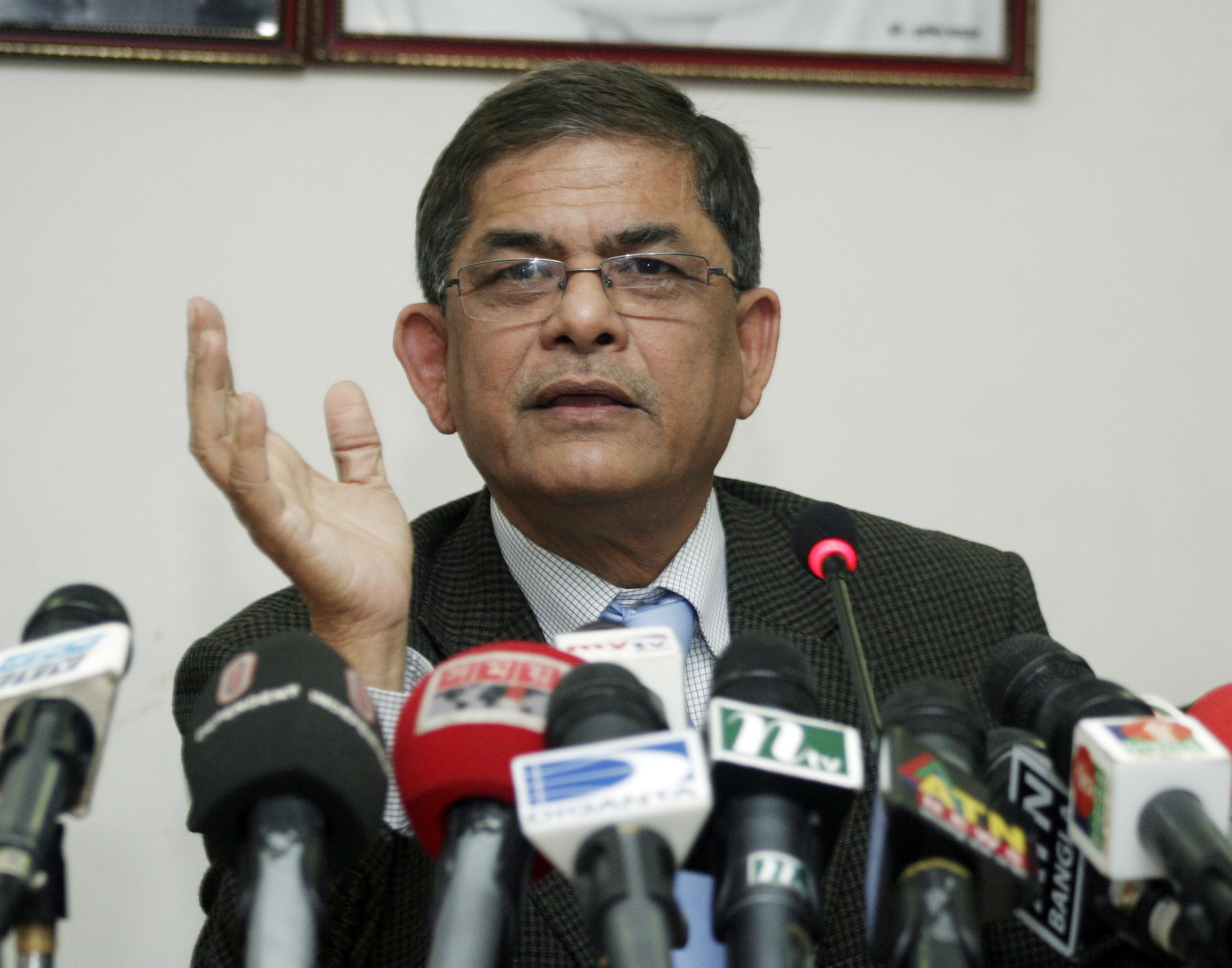
Alamgir in 2010

Alamgir was named acting secretary general of the BNP by its chairperson, Begum Khaleda Zia, following the death of secretary general Khandaker Delwar Hossain in March 2011. Some senior BNP figures disputed the nomination, stating that the BNP constitution does not allow for this. The dispute was ruled out on 21 March 2011, hours before Zia left for Saudi Arabia at invitation of the Saudi royal family.

Alamgir continued criticizing the government vibrantly on different issues. Upon organizing mass antigovernmental showdowns, he warned the government to not obstruct the opposition events. The party organized a number of countrywide populous showdowns and agitations against the government, most notably on the issue of the caretaker government, which the Awami League government demolished, enforcing its decisive two-thirds majority in the parliament in 2011.

Alamgir's motorcade came under a violent attack by an armed mob in Lakshmipur on 2 August 2011 as it was approaching the main town where Alamgir was about to attend a party meeting. The attackers were not identified, but Alamgir and his companions alleged that they were members of the ruling party, the Awami League. Though Alamgir was unhurt, three vehicles (including the one in which he was riding) were vandalized, and ten people were injured.

In February 2012, Alamgir criticized the government for its role in the Pilkhana massacre. He claimed the violence was intended to permanently damage the national security of Bangladesh and accused the Awami League government of not properly investigating the incident.

Alamgir became the BNP's secretary general in 2016. On 13 August 2026, prior to submitting his nomination for the presidency of Bangladesh, he stepped down as Secretary General of the Bangladesh Nationalist Party after 16 years in office. His tenure made him the longest-serving Secretary General in the party's history. He also resigned from the party's National Standing Committee on the same day.

== Presidency (2026–present) ==
=== Election ===
Alamgir was nominated by his party, the Bangladesh Nationalist Party (BNP), as its candidate for the 23rd presidential election.

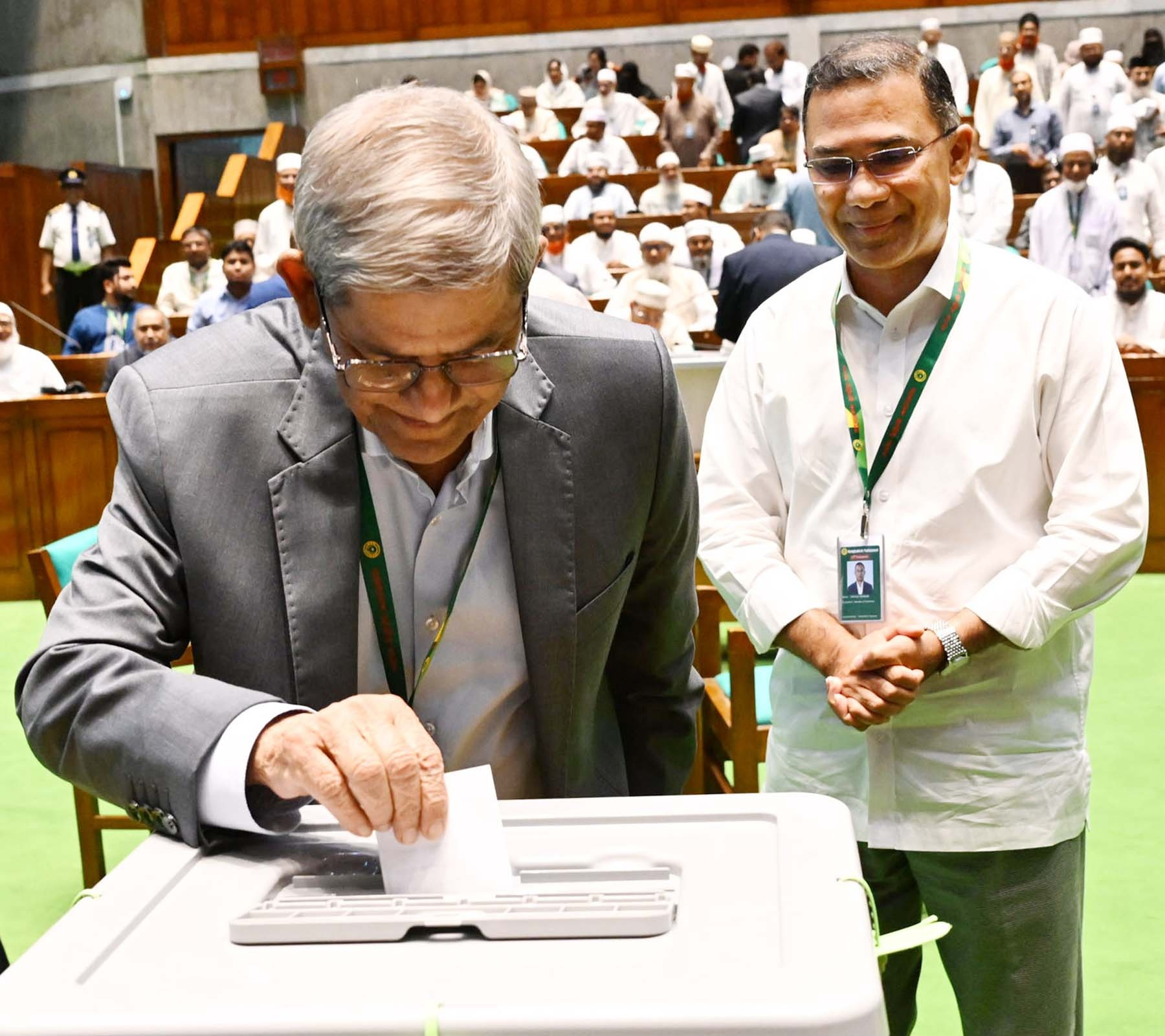
Alamgir casting his vote in the presidential election.

The election was held on 20 August, with Alamgir and Oli Ahmed as the two candidates. Mirza Fakhrul received 255 votes, while Oli Ahmed received 88 votes.

On 9 August 2026, while speaking at an event at the Rangpur District Shilpakala Academy, Alamgir criticized what he described as the political decision-making of Rangpur's residents. Referring to their electoral support for the Jatiya Party and Jamaat-e-Islami during periods when the BNP was in government, he questioned how the region could progress under such political choices.

His statement drew a response from Jamaat-e-Islami lawmakers from the region. On 11 August, 11 members of parliament elected from the Rangpur Division held a press conference demanding that Fakhrul withdraw his comments. The party subsequently organized a protest rally in Rangpur the following day.

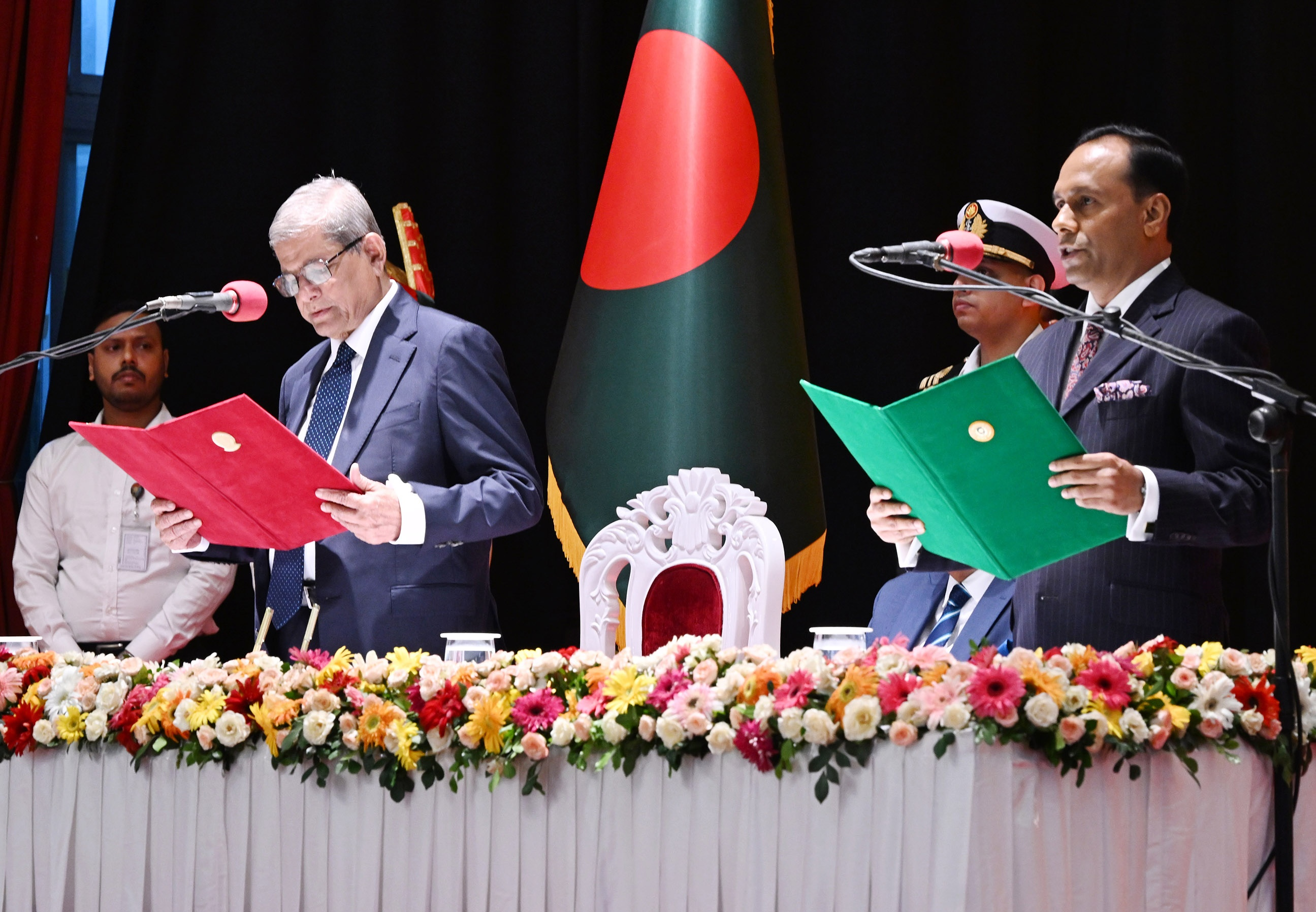
Oath taking as the President of Bangladesh

On August 21, 2026, Mirza Fakhrul Islam Alamgir was sworn in as the President of Bangladesh. At 7:30 p.m. on Friday, he took the oath of office as President at a ceremony held in the Durbar Hall of Bangabhaban in Dhaka. Acting Speaker of the Jatiya Sangsad Kaisar Kamal administered the presidential oath to him.

The oath-taking ceremony was attended by Hafiz Uddin Ahmad, who was serving as the Acting President, Prime Minister Tarique Rahman, Chief Justice Zubayer Rahman Chowdhury, former Chief Adviser of the interim government Professor Muhammad Yunus, Leader of the Opposition in the Jatiya Sangsad Shafiqul Rahman, cabinet members, members of parliament, diplomats from various countries, and senior officials of the civil and military services. Leaders of various political parties also attended the ceremony.

== Cases and convictions ==
=== 2023 alleged attack on the residence of Bangladesh's Chief Justice ===
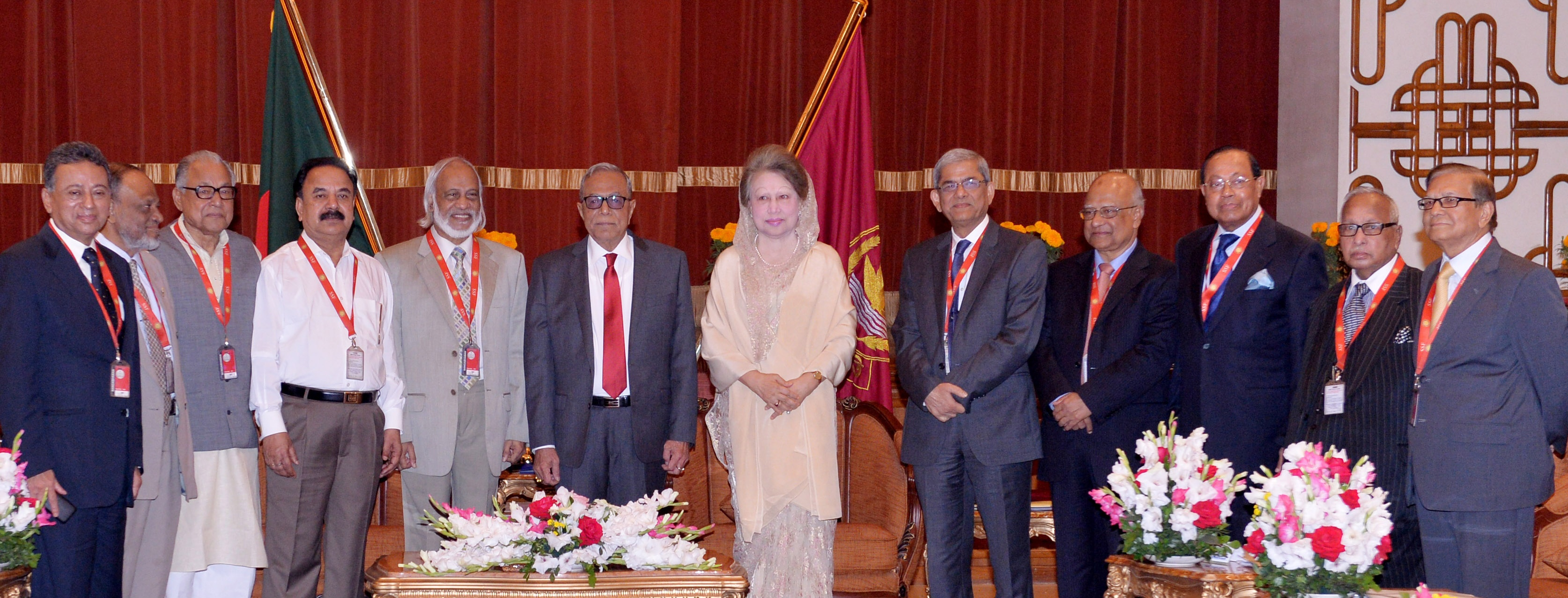
Alamgir, along with Khaleda Zia and other senior members of BNP meeting with President Mohammad Abdul Hamid in 2016.

In 2023, Bangladesh Nationalist Party organized a mass gathering in front of their central office in Nayapaltan, Dhaka on 28 October. In the following day, the Detective Branch (DB) of Dhaka Metropolitan Police (DMP) initially raided Alamgir's residence on charges of inciting of attacking on the police and attacked at the residence of the Chief Justice during the massive gathering. Exactly 10 minutes after the raid, the DB officials came back and took Alamgir into custody. Which is confirmed by Press Wing Member of BNP Chairperson Shairul Kabir Khan and Additional Deputy Commissioner of DB, Gulshan Division, Hafiz Al Asad to Prothom Alo. After the capture, he was taken to the head office of the Detective Branch. Deputy Commissioner of Media and Public Relations Department of DMP Farooque Hossain told Prothom Alo that he will be shown as arrested. About nine and a half hours after the capture, the police reported that Alamgir was arrested. DMP Commissioner Habibur Rahman told Prothom Alo that he was arrested in the case of murder and car burning in Paltan police station.

Later, following his bail application, the High Court Division observed in the full text of a judgment in mid-January 2024 that an attack on the Chief Justice's residence amounted to sedition.

On December 3 of the same year, the Dhaka Metropolitan Magistrate's Court discharged 83 BNP leaders and activists from the case, including Mirza Fakhrul Islam Alamgir and members of the National Standing Committee of BNP Mirza Abbas and Amir Khasru Mahmud Chowdhury.

== Views and ideology ==
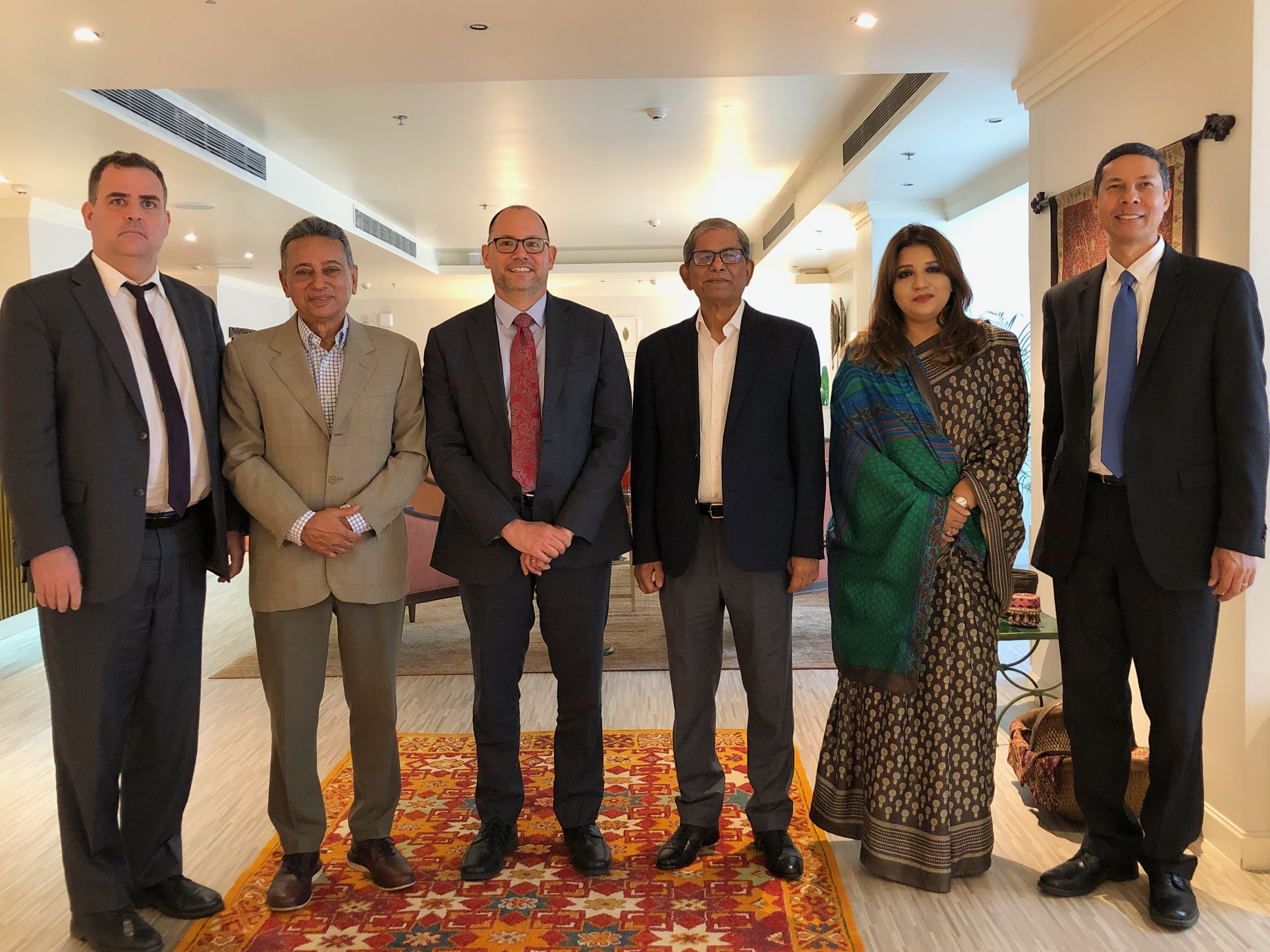
Alamgir and other members of BNP with US ambassador Peter D. Haas in 2023.

As a self-described liberal democrat, Alamgir opposed the ban of the Awami League. In an interview to Indian Express, he stated that the BNP did not believe neither Islamic law nor fundamentalism. He also commented that the BNP's alliance with Jamaat-e-Islami is a political "strategic" one. Alamgir rejected claims of BNP being anti-Indian calling it Awami League's propaganda. He sought friendly relations with India including India's right-wing Hindutva Bharatiya Janata Party (BJP).

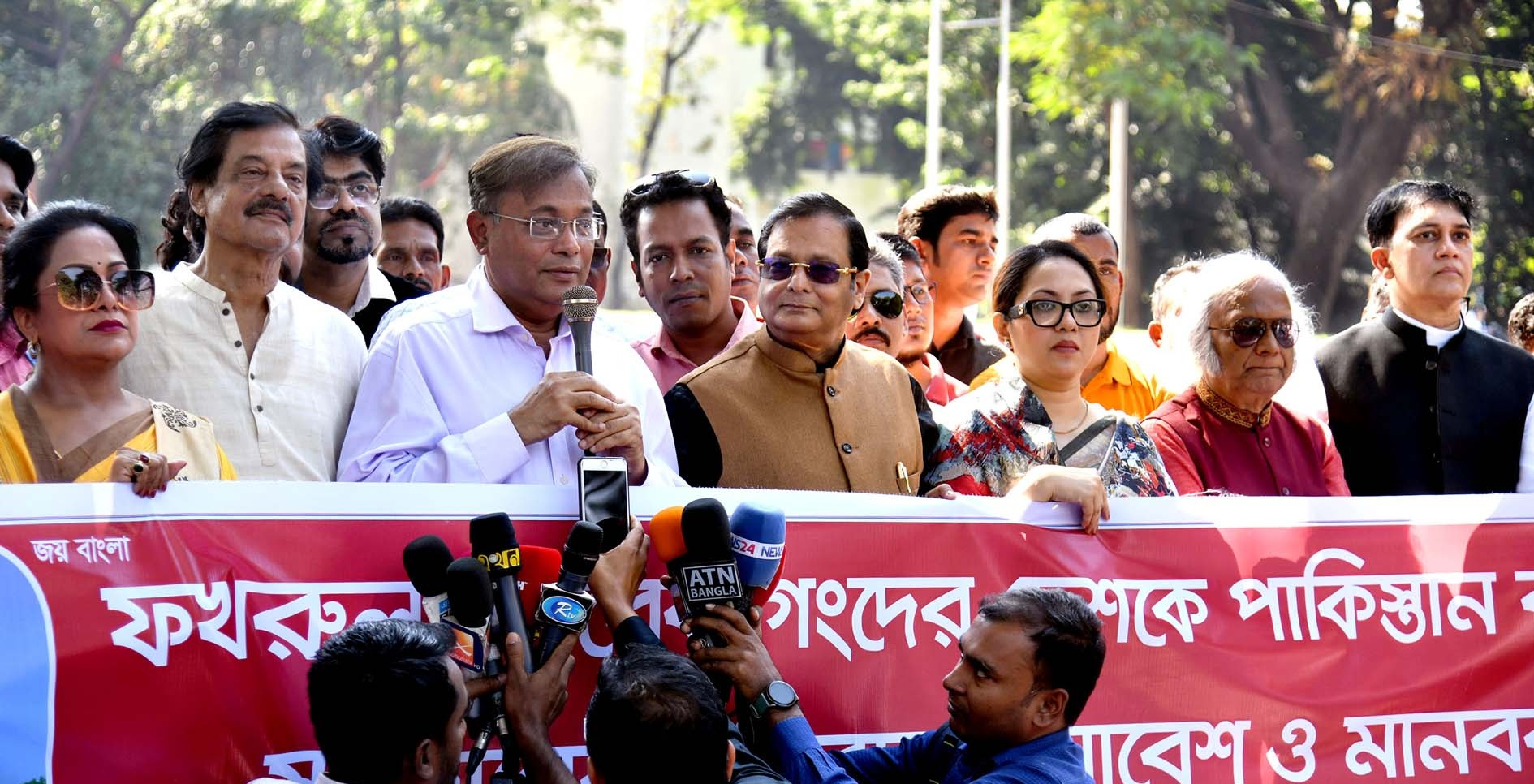
In 2022, a group of Bangladeshi pro Awami League media personalities organised a rally at Central Shaheed Minar, Dhaka, accusing Alamgir, Tarique Rahman, and their associates of a conspiracy to turn Bangladesh into Pakistan.

21 April 2026, while addressing Vice Minister of International Department of the Chinese Communist Party Jin Xin and other officials, Alamgir expressed gratitude to China for the warm hospitality. He emphasis that China and Bangladesh's relationship built on mutual respect and shared benefit. Alamgir reaffirmed Dhaka's commitment to the One China Principle, he emphasized this principle as foundation of strong bilateral ties.

== Personal life ==
Alamgir's father was politician Mirza Ruhul Amin. Alamgir is married to Rahat Ara Begum, who attended Calcutta University and presently works in an insurance company in Dhaka. The couple has two daughters, Dr. Shamaruh Mirza and Mirza Safaruh. Shamaruh attended Dhaka University and was a teacher in the institution. She is now a medical scientist and the co-founder of SiTara's Story. Safaruh, also a University of Dhaka graduate, teaches in a school in Dhaka.

Alamgir's uncle, Mirza Ghulam Hafiz, was a BNP politician who served as the Minister of Land (1978–79), Minister of Law, Justice, and Parliamentary Affairs (1991–96), and was elected MP from a Dhaka constituency in 1979. Hafiz was the speaker of the 2nd national parliament of Bangladesh (1979–82).

Another uncle, Wing Commander S. R. Mirza, served in the first government of Bangladesh, that was formed in exile (the Mujibnagar Government) in April 1971. His uncle was named to head the newly formed Directorate of Youth Camps that oversaw training facilities for freedom fighter recruits in 1971.

== Bibliography ==
- Islam Alamgir, Mirza Fakhrul (25 October 2022). আমার স্বপ্ন আমার দেশ. Jatiotabadi Prokashana Sangstha. ISBN 978-984-8127-97-5.

== Notes ==
Political offices
Preceded by Mohammed Shahabuddin	President of Bangladesh; 2026	Succeeded by inc
Order of precedence
Preceded by First	Order of precedence of Bangladesh as President	Followed by Tarique Rahman as Prime Minister
