= Mirza Faisal Amin =

Bangladeshi politician

- মির্জা ফয়সল আমিন

Member of the Bangladesh Parliament for Thakurgaon-1
- Incumbent
- Assumed office 3 November 2026
- Preceded by: Mirza Fakhrul Islam Alamgir

Personal details
- Born: 26 December 1963 (age 62) Thakurgaon, East Pakistan, Pakistan
- Party: Bangladesh Nationalist Party
- Relations: Mirza Fakhrul Islam Alamgir (brother)
- Parents: Mirza Ruhul Amin (father); Fatema Begum (mother)
- Education: Jahangirnagar University; Dhaka College

Mirza Faisal Amin (born 26 December 1963) is a Bangladeshi politician of the Bangladesh Nationalist Party. He is the incumbent Jatiya Sangsad member representing the Thakurgaon-1 constituency. He is the younger brother of Mirza Fakhrul Islam Alamgir, the incumbent president of Bangladesh.

== Early life and education ==
Amin was born to Mirza Ruhul Amin and Fatema Begum in Thakurgaon District. He is the youngest among the seven siblings. He completed his SSC from Thakurgaon Government Boys High School and HSC from Dhaka College. Then he admitted to Jahangirnagar University for graduation.

== Career ==
Amin is a member of national executive committee of Bangladesh Nationalist Party. He was elected as mayor of Thakurgaon municipality in 2015. He is also the president of Thakurgaon District BNP committee.
