= 2026 Bangladeshi presidential election =

- 20 August 2026

349 (Note: One seat for Chittagong-14 constituency was vacant during the election) members of the 13th Jatiya Sangsad 175 electoral votes were needed to win
- Turnout: 98.28%
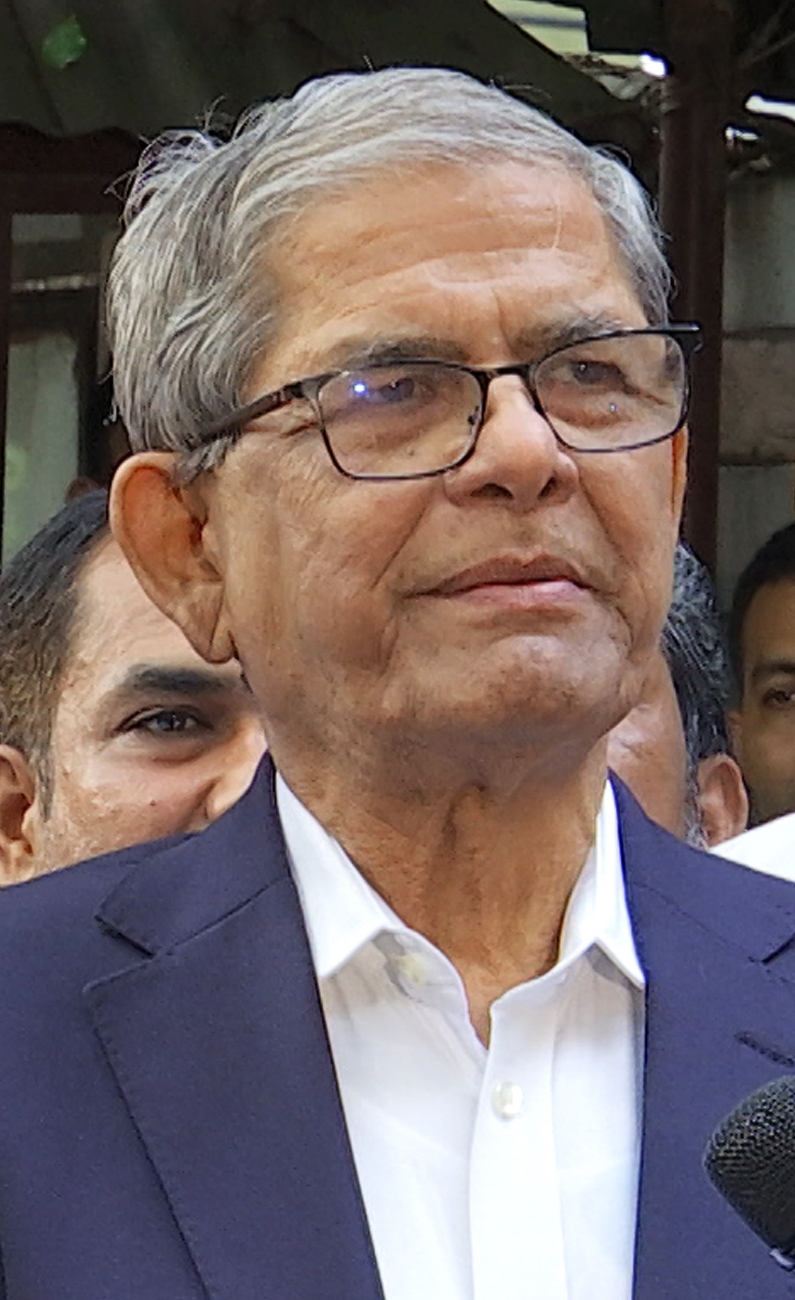

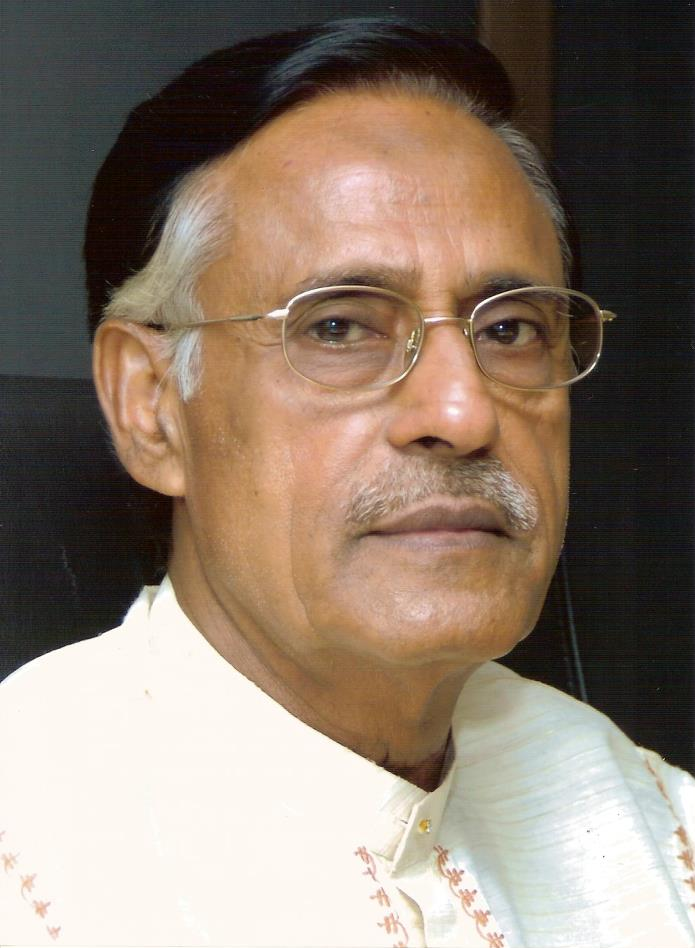
Candidate	Mirza Fakhrul Islam Alamgir	Oli Ahmad
Party	BNP	LDP
Alliance		11 Party Alliance
Electoral vote	255	88
Percentage	74.34%	25.66%
Home district	Thakurgaon	Chittagong
Divisions carried	6	2
- Results according to constituencies represented by voting parliamentarians.
President before election
Hafiz Uddin Ahmad (acting)
BNP
Elected President
Mirza Fakhrul Islam Alamgir
BNP

A presidential election was held on 20 August 2026 to elect the 23rd president of Bangladesh. It took place following the resignation of Mohammed Shahabuddin, the 22nd president of Bangladesh, citing health reasons. Bangladesh Nationalist Party (BNP) candidate Mirza Fakhrul Islam Alamgir was elected as the president, receiving almost three-fourths of the parliamentary votes. It was Bangladesh's first contested presidential election in 35 years, the last one being in 1991.

== Background ==
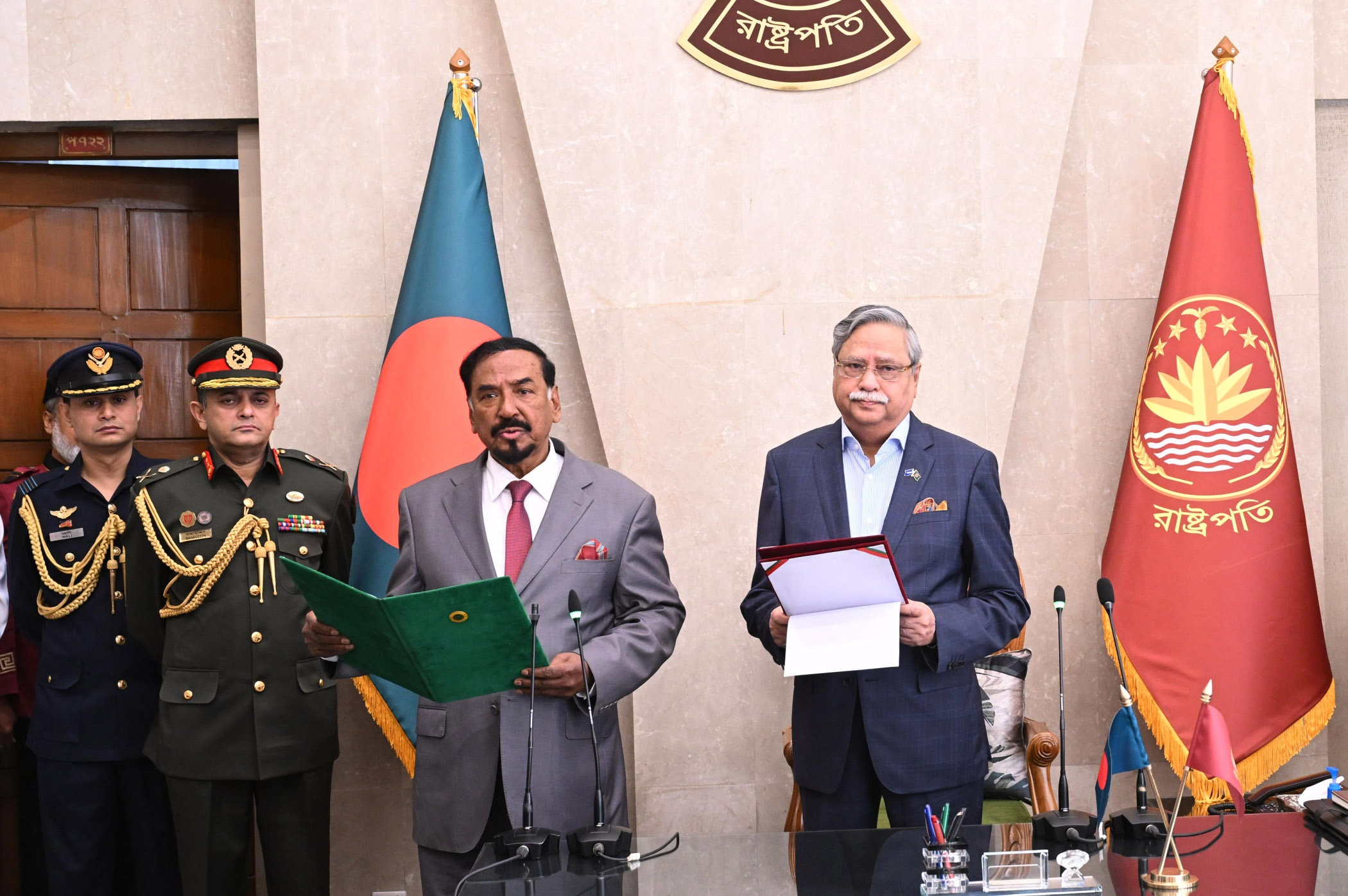
President Mohammed Shahabuddin (right) administering the oath of Hafiz Uddin Ahmad (left) as Speaker of the Jatiya Sangsad on 12 March 2026.

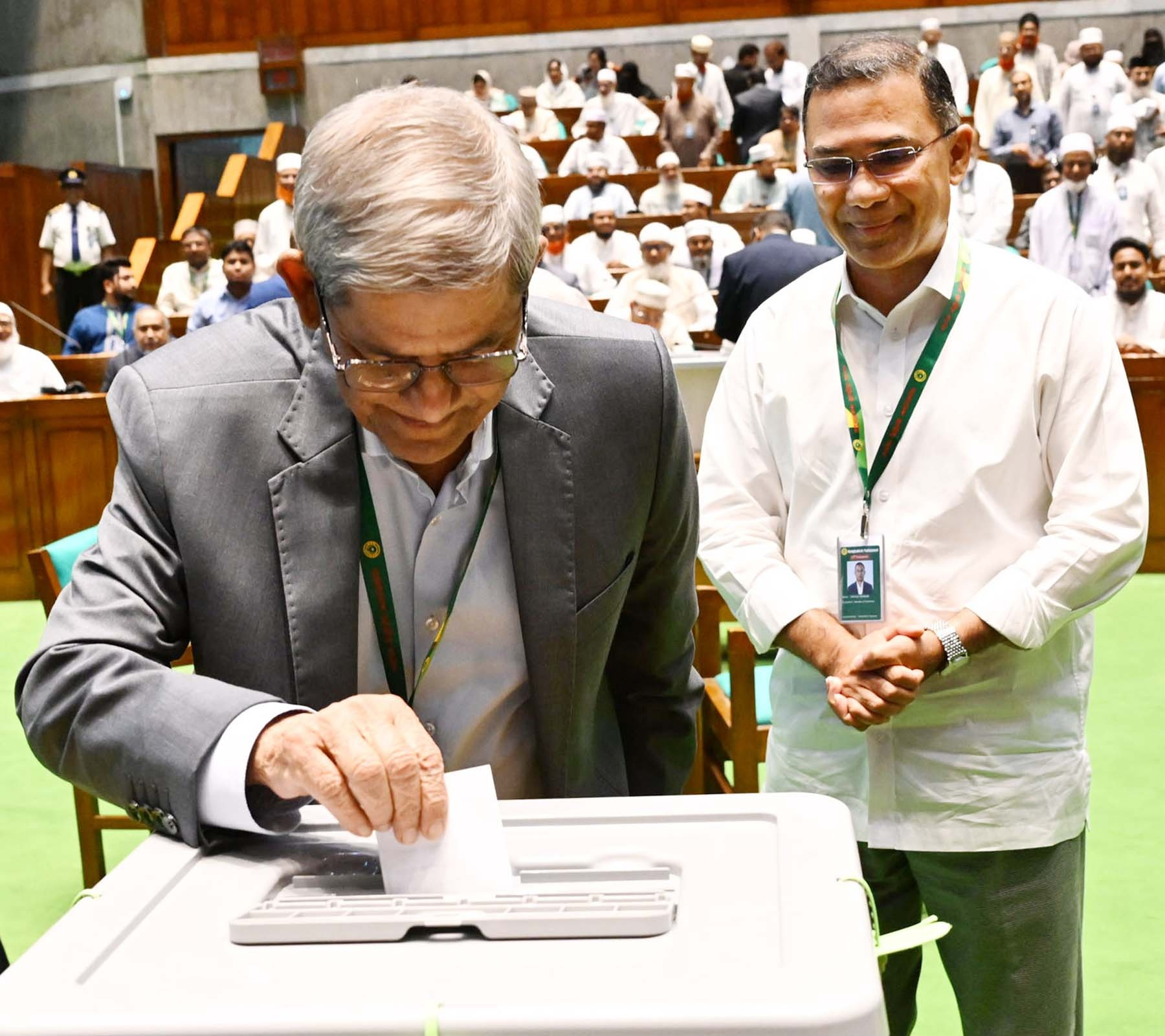
Mirza Fakhrul Islam Alamgir casting his vote.

After the 2008 general election, the Awami League under the leadership of Sheikh Hasina, came to power and retained it for almost 15 years, until her resignation in the July Uprising in 2024. International observers and opposition entities had heavily accused the Awami League regime for democratic backsliding and autocratic tendencies. Mohammed Shahabuddin, a low profile retired jurist, was nominated by Sheikh Hasina for the 2023 presidential election, which he won unopposed like most indirect presidential elections before. He took office on 24 April 2023, succeeding Mohammad Abdul Hamid, the longest serving president in the country's history.

Following the fall of Hasina regime in the July Uprising, Mohammed Shahabuddin remained the only person in high office of the state with ties with the Awami League. President Shahabuddin had then assumed de facto executive power from 5 to 8 August in the constitutional crisis as the Reuters described him as the "sole remaining constitutional authority", until the interim government led by Muhammad Yunus was formed and sworn in. Shahabuddin's ties with the former government made the relation between him and the interim government worsen, with the president being cut off from most ceremonial duties and his press, media and communication wing obliterated. Organisations related to the July Uprising, including the Students Against Discrimination, Jatiya Nagorik Committee, Inqilab Moncho and with the support of Bangladesh Jamaat-e-Islami, actively campaigned for the removal of Shahabuddin from presidency; accusing him of giving tacit support to Hasina regime's crimes against humanity and July massacre, and attempting to rehabilitate Awami League. Shahabuddin remained in office despite calls for his resignation, mostly with the support of the Bangladesh Armed Forces and the Bangladesh Nationalist Party (BNP), which opposed his removal due to their concerns about deepening constitutional crisis and an attempt to prolong an unconstitutional government. However, Shahabuddin still expressed his desire to resign after the scheduled 2026 general election, alleging Muhammad Yunus of constitutional misconduct and humiliating the presidency.

After the landslide victory of BNP in the 2026 general election from which the Awami League was barred from, Shahabuddin was allowed to resume his presidential duties and press activities by Tarique Rahman's government. Shahabuddin backtracked from his desire to resign after that.

On July 24, 2026, Shahabuddin resigned from office, citing severe health complications, including autonomic neuropathy, heart disease, and related physical and mental incapacity that prevented him from carrying out his constitutional duties. After his resignation, Speaker Hafiz Uddin Ahmad became the acting president.

== Electoral system ==
The president is elected by an indirect election by the members of the Jatiya Sangsad as per Article 48 of the Constitution. Under Section 10 of the Presidential Election Act, lawmakers vote publicly, with each voter casting one ballot. However, since 1991, when parliamentary government system was restored in Bangladesh, all of government party candidates have been elected uncontested.

According to Article 70 of the Constitution, members of parliament cannot vote against their party's candidate, a provision that arguably also applies to presidential elections as well.

On 13 August 2026, a week before the election, a writ petition was filed with the Supreme Court challenging Article 70, arguing that it affects the independence of Parliament. On 18 August 2026, the High Court summarily rejected the petition.

== Election schedule ==
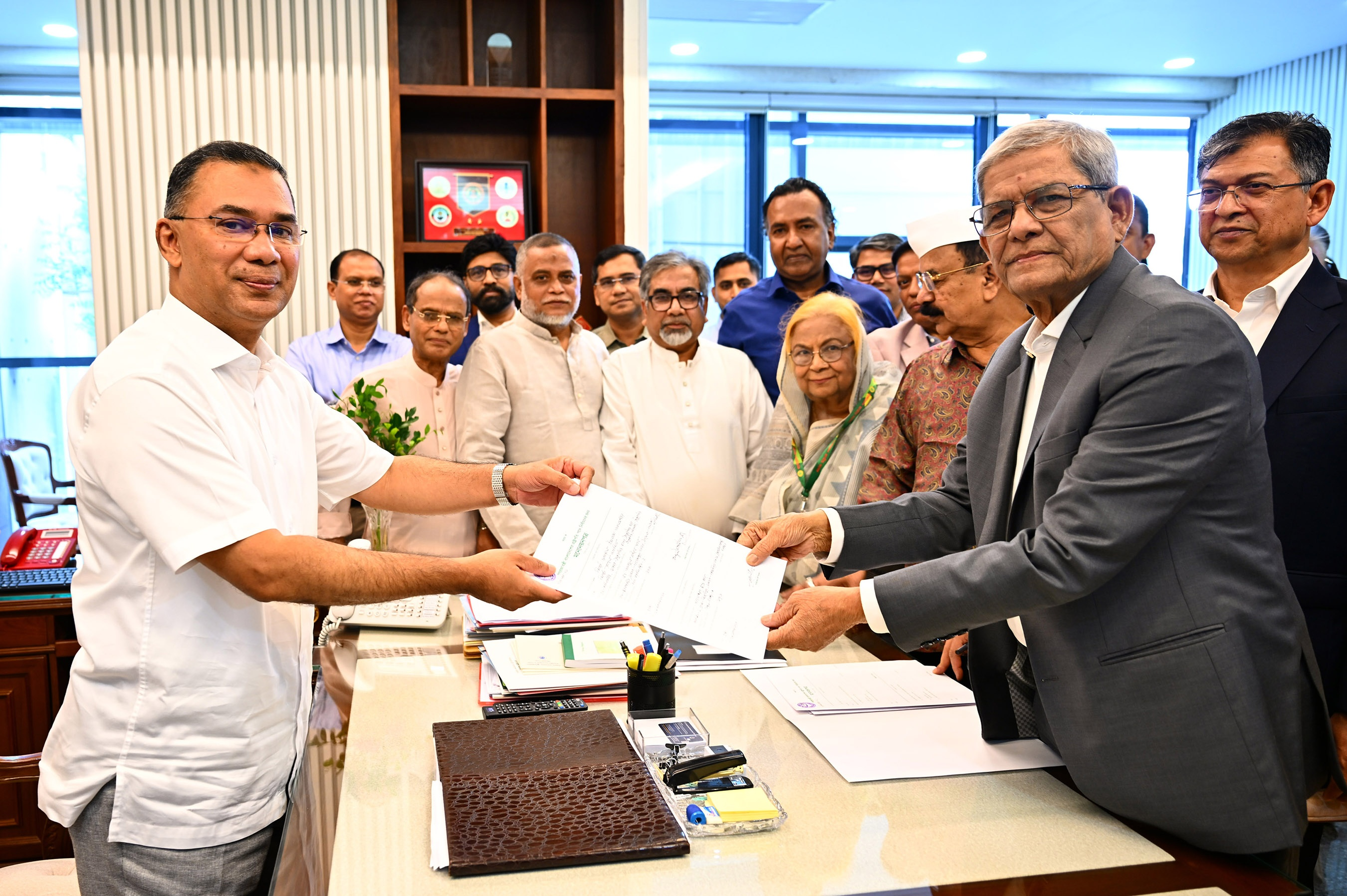
Mirza Fakhrul receiving his presidential nomination papers from Tarique Rahman

Schedule
Poll Event	Schedule (Note: All time in bst)
Declaration of the schedule	6 August 2026
Application deadline for candidates	13 August 2026 (10:00 am to 16:00 pm)
Scrutiny of nomination	16 August 2026
Last date for withdrawal of nomination	18 August 2026
Date of poll	20 August 2026 (14:00 pm to 17:00 pm)
Date of counting of votes	20 August 2026
Oath taking ceremony	21 August 2026

== Electoral college ==
2026 Bangladesh presidential electoral college
Bloc	Party	Electorate(s)	
BNP+	Bangladesh Nationalist Party (Note: Bobby Hajjaj of the Nationalist Democratic Movement (NDM) is a MP from Dhaka-13 who officially contested as a BNP candidate and is officially registered as such in the Jatiya Sangsad.)	247	257
BNP+	Bangladesh Jatiya Party	1	257
BNP+	Ganosanhati Andolan	1	257
BNP+	Gono Odhikar Parishad	1	257
BNP+	Independents (parliamentary party)	7	257
11 Parties+	Bangladesh Jamaat-e-Islami	77	90
11 Parties+	National Citizen Party	8	90
11 Parties+	Bangladesh Khelafat Majlis	3	90
11 Parties+	Khelafat Majlis	1	90
11 Parties+	Jatiya Ganotantrik Party	1	90
Islami Andolan Bangladesh		1	
Independent		1	
Total		349	
Source: Voter List Gazette

== Candidates ==
=== 11 Party Alliance ===
Candidate	Born	Affiliation	Positions held	Home district	Date announced	Ref.
Oli Ahmad	30 September 1941 (age 85) Chandanaish, Bengal Province, British India	Liberal Democratic Party	Member of Parliament representing Chittagong-13 and Chittagong-14 (1991–2014); President of the Liberal Democratic Party (2006 – present); Minister of Road Transport and Bridges (1991–1996); Minister of Power, Energy and Mineral Resources (1996); President of Bangladesh Football Federation (1992–1994)	Chittagong	9 August 2026	

=== Bangladesh Nationalist Party ===
Candidate	Born	Affiliation	Positions held	Home district	Date announced	Ref.
Mirza Fakhrul Islam Alamgir	26 January 1948 (age 78) Thakurgaon, East Bengal, Dominion of Pakistan	Bangladesh Nationalist Party	Minister of Local Government, Rural Development and Co-operatives (2026); Member of the Bangladesh Nationalist Party (1991–2026); Senior joint secretary-general (2008–2016); Secretary-general (2016–2026; acting from 2011–2016); Member of Parliament representing Thakurgaon-1 (1996, 2001–2006, 2026); Vice-president of Asia Pacific Democracy Union (2019–2026); State Minister of Agriculture (2001–2005); State Minister of Civil Aviation and Tourism (2005–2006)	Thakurgaon	13 August 2026	

== Results ==
BNP candidate Mirza Fakhrul Islam Alamgir was declared the winner of the presidential election following a 255–88 vote, defeating the LDP candidate Oli Ahmad.

Six MPs namely Mirza Abbas, Osman Faruk, and Mustafa Kamal Pasha of the BNP, Gazi Nazrul Islam, who was expelled from Jamaat, Abul Hasan of Khelafat Majlis, and independent Rumeen Farhana did not vote in this election.

Candidate	Party	Votes	%
Mirza Fakhrul Islam Alamgir	Bangladesh Nationalist Party	255	74.34
Oli Ahmad	Liberal Democratic Party	88	25.66
Total		343	100.00
Valid votes		343	100.00
Invalid/blank votes		0	0.00
Total votes		343	100.00
Registered voters/turnout		349	98.28

== Reactions and responses ==
=== Awami League ===
The president of the banned Awami League and former prime minister Sheikh Hasina, who is in exile in India since her resignation in 2024, in an online meeting with party members, talked about the election while criticizing Muhammad Yunus, BNP, and their allies, stating,

"They came to plunder, and they'll leave after plundering. One (Yunus) has already made off with the loot, yet he was itching to become president. In that regard he was not made president, and for that I would rather thank the BNP, that they didn’t reinstate that usurious cheat. ... He (Tarique) gave it (presidency) to a politician (Fakhrul), and that's the big thing. But they, too, fall to the same gang of looters. So everybody must unite to protect the country."

Journalist Anis Alamgir described her acknowledgement for Fakhrul "rare" but a sort of schadenfreude; quoting,

"This is not love for Husayn, it is the hatred for Yazid."

Earlier, Hasina called Shahabuddin's resignation "forced", comparing it with previous incidents under Ziaur Rahman and Khaleda Zia, saying,

Grabbing arms, entering the president house, into his (Abu Sadat Mohammad Sayem) bedroom, stomping shoes in his bed, wearing boots, [Ziaur Rahman] told him (Sayem), "You must resign, you can no longer remain president." Seizing power like that he declared himself president. Khaleda Zia, after coming to power, took Badruddoza Chowdhury, and our another president, Mr. Biswas (Note: Abdur Rahman Biswas completed his term under Hasina in 1996, thus the claim is factually incorrect.), ousted [these] two. And now their son (Tarique) came and ousted our sitting president. This is simply their nature. They don't know how to respect people; their lust for power is what matters the most to them.

AL general secretary Obaidul Quader, said that back when Fakhrul was his counterpart in BNP, Quader asked him about Ziaur Rahman's involvement in the assassination of Sheikh Mujibur Rahman, facilitating the assassins, and making the Indemnity Ordinance, 1975 a recognised law. Quader claimed that Fakhrul, who had stated that Zia was innocent, was unable to answer his questions, even till that day when he became "his excellency, the president".

Former foreign minister and AL member A. K. Abdul Momen however congratulated Fakhrul on his presidency. When asked on Deutsche Welle Bangla, Momen replied that it was a personal gesture rather than a stance of the party, and Fakhrul was his close friend and classmate. Answering further questions regarding Fakhrul's treatment as an opposition figure, Momen claimed that during his ministership he did tell the government to not prosecute politicians vehemently and Fakhrul was "a good guy", but was told that Fakhrul was an abettor and was shown evidences by agencies.

=== Islami Andolan Bangladesh ===
After Shahabuddin's resignation, the Islami Andolan Bangladesh, being the only non-aligned party in the parliament, called for a presidential election in line with the July Charter, and demanded the constitution to be amended swiftly in the next parliamentary session. On polling day, the party initially announced an election boycott. In a statement signed by party secretary Gazi Ataur Rahman, they cited their protest against BNP's backtracking from the reforms agreed upon in the July Charter as the reason and called the election "meaningless" and a "waste of people's money". However, IAB's sole MP Mahmudul Hossain Waliullah from Barguna-1 eventually cast his ballot in favor of Alamgir, inciting media speculation. Later, citing party sources, news media reported that the member voted following party Ameer Syed Rezaul Karim's directive, based on the assurances from home minister Salahuddin Ahmed that the next election would be carried out in accordance with Article 70 and other constitutional reforms.

=== Jatiya Party ===
Factions of the Jatiya Party (Ershad) congratulated Alamgir on his election separately. EC-recognised chairman GM Quader issued a statement on his own, while Anisul Islam Mahmud and ABM Ruhul Amin Howlader— representing the National Democratic Front-leading faction— issued a separate joint statement. Mahmud and Howlader had also congratulated him earlier upon his nomination.

=== Krishak Sramik Janata League ===
After Hafiz Uddin Ahmad assumed office as acting president, Krishak Sramik Janata League president and Bangladesh Liberation War military commander Abdul Kader Siddique congratulated him as a fellow freedom fighter and expressed hope that he'll become the "permanent (elected) president" and "play an unforgettable role during this difficult time for nation." Siddique later congratulated Fakhrul on "finally being elected as president." He further stated,

After former president Abu Sayeed Chowdhury, there is no other political figure in Bangladesh who is as thoroughly non-confrontational from head to toe as you.

== See also ==
- 2026 Bangladeshi general election
- 2026 Bangladeshi constitutional referendum
