= S. R. Mirza =

S. R. Mirza is a retired wing commander of the Pakistan Air Force and an official of the Mujibnagar government during the Bangladesh Liberation War. He commanded the youth camp, which trained recruits for the Mukti Bahini.

== Early life ==
Mirza was born into a well-known political family in Thakurgaon District.

== Career ==
Mirza was commissioned in the Pakistan Air Force in 1950. He retired as a wing commander of the Pakistan Air Force in 1969. During the Bangladesh Liberation War, he was the director general of the youth camp (Juba Shibir) where Mukti Bahini officers were trained in India. He was unaware of the training for Mujib Bahini recruits, which India's Research and Analysis Wing handled. On India's role, he said, "Indian war strategy was carefully thought out and planned. Many military experts consider that the 1971 war was one of the biggest and best-planned in the history of warfare."

After the independence of Bangladesh, Mirza served as the first chief of the Department of Civil Aviation (later renamed the Civil Aviation Authority of Bangladesh). He reconstructed seven airports in Bangladesh that were damaged during the war.

== Personal life ==
Mirza's brothers, Mirza Golam Hafiz and Mirza Ruhul Amin, were members of parliament. His nephew, Mirza Fakhrul Islam Alamgir, is the general secretary of the Bangladesh Nationalist Party.
