= Ali Akbar (Bangladeshi politician) =

Bangladeshi politician

Member of Bangladesh Parliament
- In office 1973–1976
- Succeeded by: Mirza Ruhul Amin

Personal details
- Party: Bangladesh Awami League

Ali Akbar is a Bangladesh Awami League politician and a former member of parliament for Dinajpur-4.

== Career ==
He was elected to parliament from Dinajpur-4 as a Bangladesh Awami League candidate in 1973.
