= Md. Julfiker Murtuja Chowdhury =

Bangladeshi politician

Zulfiqar Mortuza Chowdhury
- জুলফিকার মর্তুজা চৌধুরী

Member of the Bangladesh Parliament for Thakurgaon-2
- In office 15 February 1996 – 12 June 1996
- Preceded by: Dabirul Islam
- Succeeded by: Dabirul Islam

Personal details
- Born: Zulfiqar Mortuza Chowdhury Tula Thakurgaon District
- Party: Bangladesh Nationalist Party

Md. Julfiker Murtuja Chowdhury is a Bangladesh Nationalist Party politician and the former member of parliament for Thakurgaon-2.

== Career ==
Zulfiqar was elected to parliament from Thakurgaon-2 as a Bangladesh Nationalist Party candidate in 15 February 1996 Bangladeshi general election. He was defeated from Thakurgaon-2 constituency on 12 June 1996 on the nomination of Bangladesh Nationalist Party.

He submitted his nomination papers for the Eleventh Parliamentary Election of 2019 and later withdrew them.
