= Khademul Islam =

Bangladeshi politician

Member of Bangladesh Parliament
- In office 27 February 1991 – 15 February 1996
- Preceded by: Rezwanul Haque Idu Chowdhury
- Succeeded by: Mirza Fakhrul Islam Alamgir
- In office 12 June 1996 – 17 December 1997
- Preceded by: Mirza Fakhrul Islam Alamgir
- Succeeded by: Ramesh Chandra Sen

Personal details
- Party: Bangladesh Awami League

Khademul Islam is a Bangladesh Awami League politician and a former member of parliament for Thakurgaon-1.

== Career ==
Islam was elected to parliament from Thakurgaon-1 as a Bangladesh Awami League candidate in 1991 and on 12 June 1996.
