= Thakurgaon-2 =

Constituency of Bangladesh's Jatiya Sangsad

Coordinates: 26.09°N 88.28°E

- Constituency for the Jatiya Sangsad
- District: Thakurgaon District
- Division: Rangpur Division
- Electorate: 340,049 (2026)

Current constituency
- Created: 1984
- Party: Bangladesh Nationalist Party
- Member: Abdus Salam
- ← 3 Thakurgaon-1 5 Thakurgaon-3 →

Thakurgaon-2 is a constituency represented in the Jatiya Sangsad (National Parliament) of Bangladesh since 2026 by Abdus Salam of the Bangladesh Nationalist Party.

== Boundaries ==
The constituency encompasses Baliadangi and Haripur upazilas and two union parishads of Ranisankail Upazila: Dharmaghar, and Kashipur.

== History ==
The constituency was created in 1984 from the Dinajpur-4 constituency when the former Dinajpur District was split into three districts: Panchagarh, Thakurgaon, and Dinajpur.

== Members of Parliament ==
| Election | Member | Party |
|---|---|---|
| 1986 | Dabirul Islam | Communist Party of Bangladesh |
| 1988 | Mirza Ruhul Amin | Jatiya Party |
| 1991 | Dabirul Islam | Communist Party of Bangladesh |
| Feb 1996 | Md. Julfiker Murtuja Chowdhury | Bangladesh Nationalist Party |
| Jun 1996 | Dabirul Islam | Awami League |
| 2024 | Mazharul Islam Suzon | Awami League |
| 2026 | Abdus Salam | Bangladesh Nationalist Party |

== Elections ==
=== Elections in the 2020s ===
General Election 2026: Thakurgaon-2
| Party | Candidate | Votes | % | ±% |
|---|---|---|---|---|
| BNP | Abdus Salam | 121,017 | 49.9 | N/A |
| Jamaat | Abdul Hakim | 115,707 | 47.7 | N/A |
| JP(E) | Nurunnahar Begum | 2,876 | 1.2 | N/A |
| GOP | Md. Faruk Hossain | 1,843 | 0.8 | N/A |
| AB Party | Md. Nahid Rana | 451 | 0.2 | N/A |
| IAB | Md. Rezaul Karim | 437 | 0.2 | N/A |
| CPB | Shahbuddin Ahmed | 380 | 0.2 | N/A |
| Majority | | 5,310 | 2.2 | N/A |
| Turnout | | 242,711 | 71.4 | N/A |
| Registered electors | | 340,049 | | |
| BNP gain from AL | | | | |

=== Elections in the 2010s ===
Dabirul Islam was re-elected unopposed in the 2014 general election after opposition parties withdrew their candidacies in a boycott of the election.

=== Elections in the 2000s ===
General Election 2008: Thakurgaon-2
| Party | Candidate | Votes | % | ±% |
|---|---|---|---|---|
| AL | Dabirul Islam | 102,833 | 50.8 | +12.0 |
| Jamaat | Abdul Hakim | 98,456 | 48.7 | +13.2 |
| Independent | Shirin Akhtar Banu | 1,052 | 0.5 | N/A |
| Majority | | 4,377 | 2.0 | −1.3 |
| Turnout | | 202,341 | 92.7 | +4.8 |
| AL hold | | | | |

General Election 2001: Thakurgaon-2
| Party | Candidate | Votes | % | ±% |
|---|---|---|---|---|
| AL | Dabirul Islam | 62,483 | 38.8 | −3.5 |
| Jamaat | Abdul Hakim | 57,196 | 35.5 | +22.4 |
| Independent | Md. Nurul Islam | 24,081 | 14.9 | N/A |
| IJOF | Sree Suresh Chandra Singh | 16,565 | 10.3 | N/A |
| Independent | A. K. M. Enyet Ali | 434 | 0.3 | N/A |
| CPB | Md. Mohshin Sarkar | 339 | 0.2 | −0.4 |
| Majority | | 5,287 | 3.3 | −13.8 |
| Turnout | | 161,128 | 87.9 | +12.6 |
| AL hold | | | | |

=== Elections in the 1990s ===
General Election June 1996: Thakurgaon-2
| Party | Candidate | Votes | % | ±% |
|---|---|---|---|---|
| AL | Dabirul Islam | 48,344 | 42.3 | N/A |
| JP(E) | Md. Asaduzzaman | 28,757 | 25.1 | +10.9 |
| BNP | Md. Julfiker Murtuja Chowdhury | 21,314 | 18.6 | +0.2 |
| Jamaat | Abdul Hakim | 14,933 | 13.1 | −4.8 |
| CPB | Md. Mohshin Sarkar | 673 | 0.6 | −47.5 |
| Zaker Party | Md. Samsuddin | 388 | 0.3 | 0.0 |
| Majority | | 19,587 | 17.1 | −12.7 |
| Turnout | | 114,409 | 75.3 | +9.8 |
| AL gain from CPB | | | | |

General Election 1991: Thakurgaon-2
| Party | Candidate | Votes | % | ±% |
|---|---|---|---|---|
| CPB | Dabirul Islam | 46,452 | 48.1 | |
| BNP | Md. Altafur Rahman | 17,707 | 18.4 | |
| Jamaat | Abdul Hakim | 17,288 | 17.9 | |
| JP(E) | Md. Abdul Karim | 13,720 | 14.2 | |
| Independent | Md. Nur Kutub Alam | 640 | 0.7 | |
| Zaker Party | Md. A. Jobbar Sarkar | 323 | 0.3 | |
| FP | Badrul Alam Chowdhury | 270 | 0.3 | |
| Independent | Ramesh Chandra Sen | 89 | 0.1 | |
| Majority | | 28,745 | 29.8 | |
| Turnout | | 96,489 | 65.5 | |
| CPB gain from | | | | |
