= Thakurgaon Government College =

Thakurgaon Govt. College
- ঠাকুরগাঁও সরকারি কলেজ, ঠাকুরগাঁও
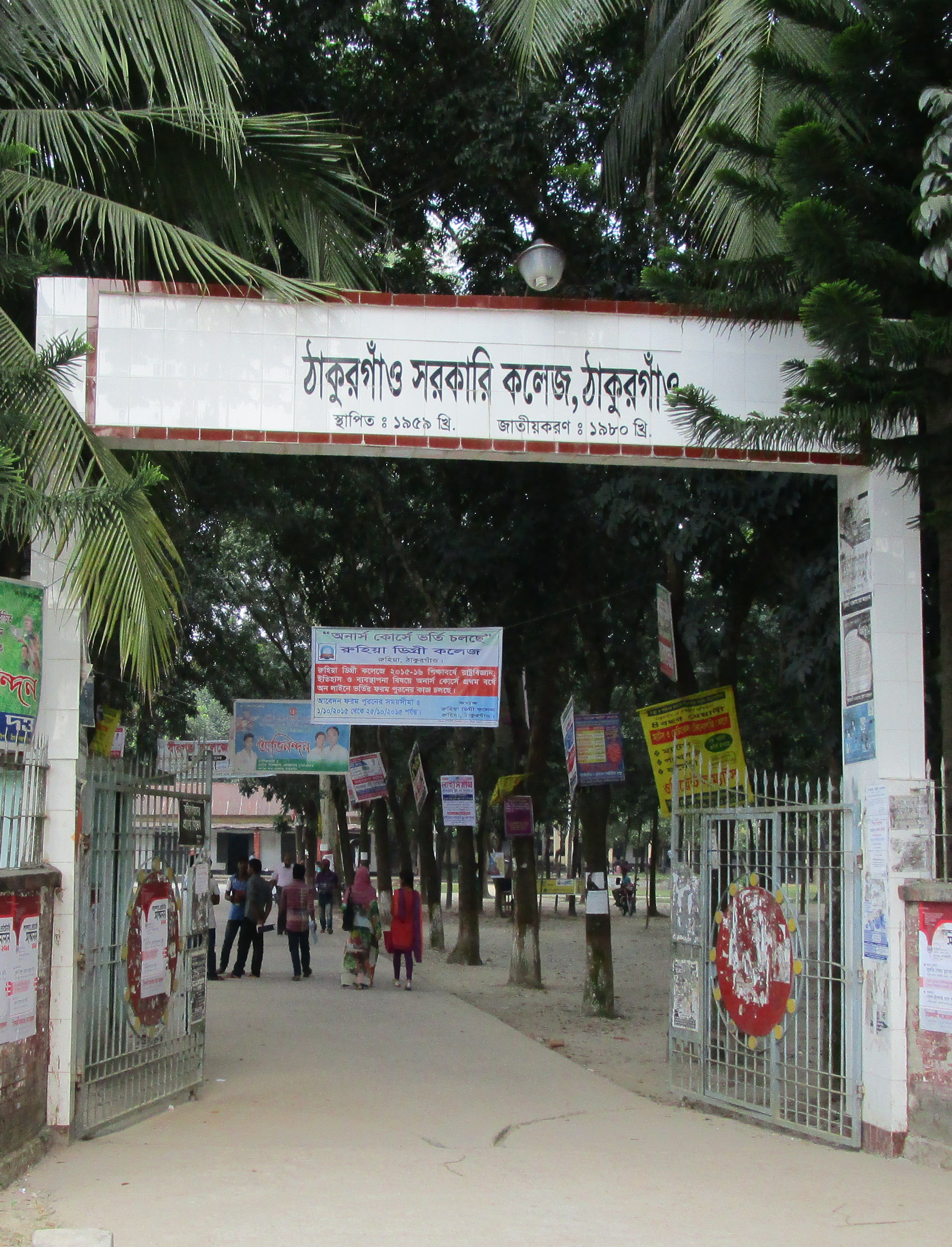
- Gate of Thakurgaon Govt. College
- Other name: TGC
- Former name: Thakurgaon Degree College
- Type: Public College
- Established: September 18, 1959; 66 years ago
- Affiliations: National University
- Principal: Prof. Md. Mokarram Hossain
- Faculty: 52
- Students: 13599
- Undergraduates: 11387
- Postgraduates: 784
- Other students: 1500 (HSC)
- Location: Gobindanagar, Thakurgaon, Rangpur, 5101, Bangladesh; 26.0394°N 88.4529°E
- Campus: 21.80 acres (8.82 ha); Urban
- Language: Bengali
- Website: tgc.edu.bd

Thakurgaon Government College is an honors-level degree college in Thakurgaon, Bangladesh. It is situated in Thakurgaon town nearest to the south-east of the Tangon River. From this college, In west Thakurgaon Railway Station and in east Thakurgaon Bus-stand(old) are located. The college authority has declared their college as a campus free from politics, drug & smoking. This college is affiliated with Bangladesh National University. On 1 March 1980, this college was named Thakurgaon Government College after nationalized.

== History ==
The college was established in September 18 1959. On 8 June 1959, it was raised a demand to established a college in Thakurgaon in meeting of "Sub-division Social Development Fund Committee". On that meeting has been taken a decision to establish this college. That times, this college was started with fifty students with temporarily appointed principal Sir Rustom Ali Khan who was the headmaster of Thakurgaon High School.

== Campus ==
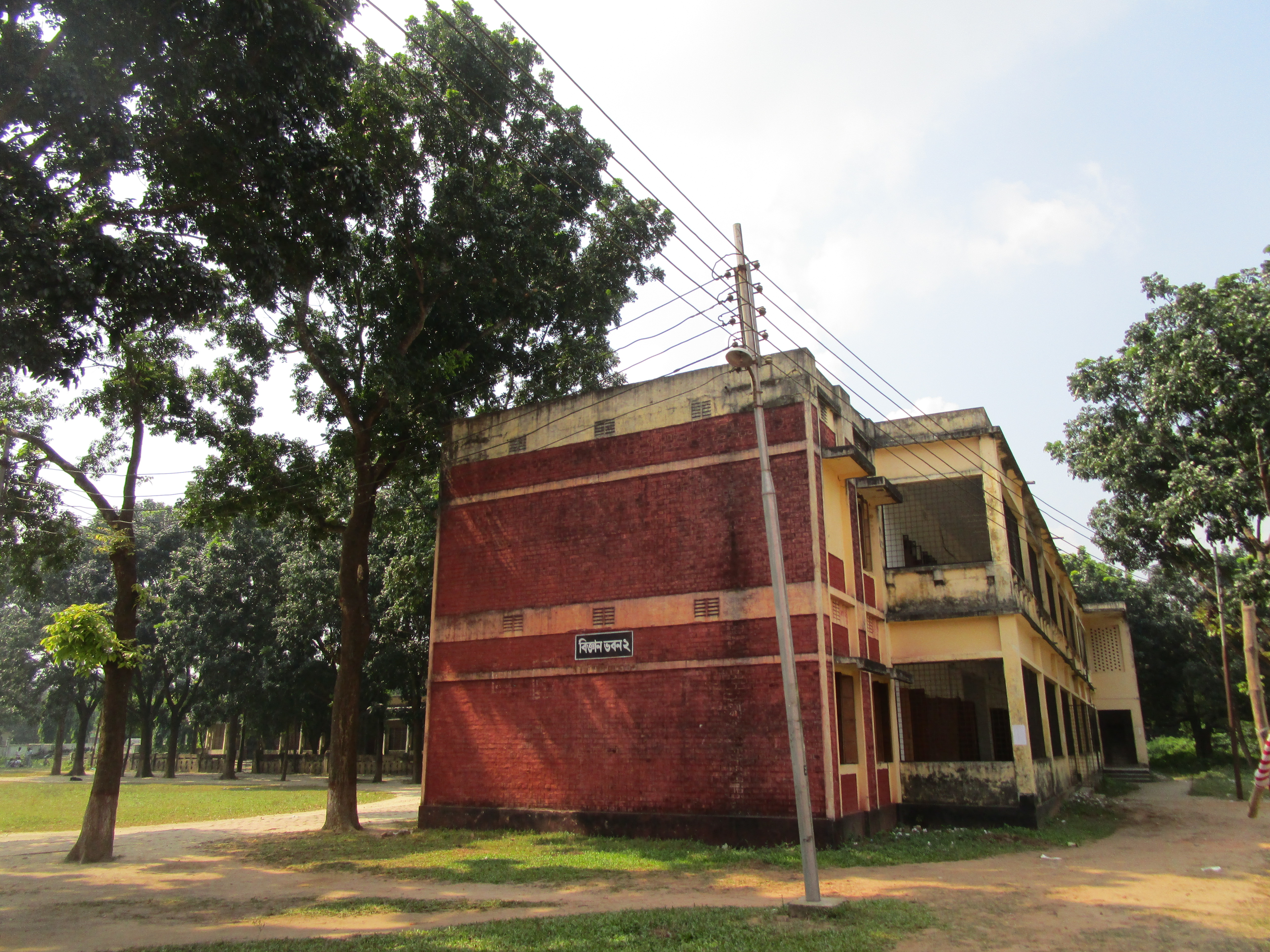
Science Building of Thakurgaon Govt. College

The campus of 31 acres has Science, Business, Arts, Administrative buildings and also a Library. There is also a Dormitory of Teachers, Mosque, Ponds, Computer Lab, Sahid Minar and playground.

Total amount of land of this college is 33 acres.

There has a rich library as name as "Central Library". Total number of books in seminar is 10,859 and the total number of books in central library is 12,844.

== Academics ==
In 1997-1998 session of this college, Bangladesh National University confessed Thakurgaon Degree College as a Honor's College after authorizing to open Honor's course in economics, accounting, mathematics and political science and next year has been confessed to open other six subject such as botany, English, management, Bengali, zoology and Islamic history and culture. In 2010-2011 session, philosophy and history were included in Honor's course and physics, chemistry in 2011-2012 session. On 23 April 2011, it opened master's course in four subjects: English, Bengali, economics, and botany.

The total number of students is 11,101 with H.S.C, Honor's, Degree(Pass) and Master's.

The total number of teachers is 75.

The college offers Higher School Certificate, Degree (Pass), Honor's and Master's courses.

=== Higher School Certificate ===
- Science
- Business
- Humanities

=== Degree (Pass) ===
1. B.A.
2. B.S.S.
3. B.Sc.
4. B.B.S.

=== Honor's ===
1. Bengali
2. English
3. Economics
4. Management
5. Botany
6. Zoology
7. Political Science
8. Islamic History and Culture
9. Philosophy
10. Accounting
11. Mathematics
12. Chemistry
13. Physics
14. History

=== Master's ===
1. English
2. Bengali
3. Economics
4. Political Science
5. Botany
6. Zoology
7. Mathematics
8. Islamic History and Culture
9. History
10. Philosophy
11. Accounting
12. Management

The examination pass rate is: Higher Secondary Certificate (2024) 90.73%, Degree(2022) 44.30%, Honor's (2022) 60.44%।

=== Result of public examination of last five years ===
==== Result of Higher Secondary Certificate ====
Exam Year	Examinees	Got GPA-5	Promoted	Rate of Pass
2024	734	149	666	90.73%
2023	697	149	628	90.10%
2022	698	244	649	92.98%
2021	740	381	698	94.32%
2020	823	504	823	100%

==== Result of Degree (Pass) ====
Exam Year	Examinees	Promoted	Rate of Pass
2022	605	268	44.30%
2021	612	273	44.61%
2020	677	231	34.12%
2019	707	174	24.61%
2018	813	362	44.53%

2025

==== Result of Honor's Final Examination ====
Exam Year	Examinees	Promoted	Rate of Pass
2022	1350	816	60.44%
2021	1376	932	67.73%
2020	1254	620	49.44%
2019	1034	806	77.95%
2018	1169	835	71.43%

== Organizations of volunteer ==
BNCC, Rovar, Red crescent, Badhon.
