= Mirza Ruhul Amin =

Bangladeshi politician

Minister of Social Welfare
- In office 23 December 1987 – 27 March 1988
- Succeeded by: Rezwanul Haque

Minister of Fisheries and Livestock
- In office 1 August 1987 – 31 December 1987
- Preceded by: Sirajul Hossain Khan
- Succeeded by: Abdus Salam

Minister of Agriculture
- In office 1 December 1986 – 9 August 1987
- Preceded by: Mohammad Abdul Munim
- Succeeded by: Mohammad Mahbubuzzaman

Minister of Land
- In office 9 July 1986 – 30 November 1986
- Preceded by: Zakir Khan Chowdhury
- Succeeded by: AKM Maidul Islam

Member of Parliament
- In office 3 March 1988 – 6 December 1990
- Preceded by: Dabirul Islam
- Succeeded by: Dabirul Islam
- Constituency: Thakurgaon-2
- In office 18 February 1979 – 24 March 1982
- Preceded by: Ali Akbar
- Succeeded by: Mizanur Rahman Manu
- Constituency: Dinajpur-4

Personal details
- Born: 28 February 1921 Atwari, Panchagarh, Bengal Presidency
- Died: 19 January 1997 (aged 75)
- Party: Jatiya Party (Ershad)
- Other political affiliations: Bangladesh Nationalist Party
- Spouse: Fatima Amin
- Relations: Mirza Ghulam Hafiz (Brother)
- Children: Mirza Fakhrul Islam Alamgir; Mirza Faisal Amin; Mirza Iqbal Amin
- Parent: Mirza Azim-ud-din Sarkar (Father)

Mirza Ruhul Amin (Bengali: মির্জা রুহুল আমিন) was a Jatiya Party (Ershad) politician and a former member of parliament for Thakurgaon-2. His son, Mirza Fakhrul Islam Alamgir, was the longest serving secretary general of Bangladesh Nationalist Party and became the 23rd President of Bangladesh on 21 August 2026.

== Early life and education ==
He was born on 28 February 1921 in Atwari, Panchagarh, Bengal Presidency. His elder brother Mirza Ghulam Hafiz was a politician who later served as the Speaker of the Jatiya Sangsad from 1979 to 1982. His alternative elder brother Wing Commander S.R. Mirza served in the Pakistan Air Force and was retired from the Pakistan Air Force in 1969. He passed matriculation from Thakurgaon Government Boys High School in 1938. He completed his Bachelor of Arts degree from University of Calcutta.

== Career ==
Ruhul Amin served in the East Pakistan Assembly from 1962 to 1969. He demanded a bridge on Jamuna bridge back in 1962 in the East Pakistan Legislative Assembly. He joined the Bangladesh Nationalist Party after independence. He was elected to parliament from Thakurgaon-2 as a Jatiya Party candidate in 1988. He had served as the minister of land and agriculture in the cabinet of Hussain Mohammad Ershad.

In 2016, Bangladesh Awami League leader Khalid Mahmud Chowdhury alleged that Mirza Ruhul Amin was a "War Criminal" but the list of collaborators published by the Bangladesh Awami League government does not include his name.

== Personal life ==
Amin was married to Fatema Amin and has 7 children including Mirza Fakhrul Islam Alamgir.

== Death ==
Mirza Ruhul Amin expired in 1997. Then prime minister Sheikh Hasina and other politician expressed condolence. Mirza Ruhul Amin auditorium in Thakurgaon was named after him.
