= Mazharul Islam Suzon =

Bangladeshi politician and parliamentarian

Md Mazharul Islam

Member of the Bangladesh Parliament for Thakurgaon-2
- In office 10 January 2024 – 6 August 2024
- Preceded by: Dabirul Islam
- Succeeded by: Abdus Salam

Personal details
- Born: 28 September 1977 (age 48)
- Party: Awami League
- Parent: Dabirul Islam (father)

Md Mazharul Islam Suzon (born 28 September 1977) is a Bangladesh Awami League politician and a former Jatiya Sangsad member representing the Thakurgaon-2 constituency in 2024.

He is the eldest son of Dabirul Islam, who represented Thankurgaon-2 in parliament for seven terms.

He has been arrested in multiple cases, including extortion and murder.
