= Bengal studies =

Academic field studying the Bengali culture

Bengal studies (Bengali: বঙ্গবিদ্যা; Bangabidya) is an interdisciplinary academic field devoted to the study of the Bengali people, culture, language, literature, and history. The focus of this field, which qualifies as area studies and cultural studies, is on Indic Bengalis who follow an indigenous system of faith and refer to themselves as Bengalis. It is a subset of South Asian studies or Indology.

A study of the history and culture of the Bengali people have been undertaken by the Bengalis themselves and others like Muhammadal-Biruni travelling to Bengal since medieval times. The work of Bankim Chandra Chattopadhyay is often considered to be a forerunner of Bengali studies after the Mughal period, while Ishwar Chandra Gupta pioneered the study of Bengali poets through a critically annotated collection of the diverse oral poetic traditions of Bengal. Twentieth-century Bengali historians like Ramesh Chandra Majumdar and Niharranjan Ray were among the prominent researchers of the history and culture of the Bengali people.

== International Congress of Bengal Studies ==
- 2010: 1st International Congress; University of Delhi, India
- 2011: 2nd International Congress; University of Dhaka, Bangladesh
- 2013: 3rd International Congress; University of Calcutta, India
- 2015: 4th International Congress; Tokyo University of Foreign Studies, Japan
- 2018: 5th International Congress; Jahangirnagar University, Bangladesh
