= Thakurgaon, India =

Village in Maharashtra

Thakurgaon
- village
- Location in Maharashtra, India Thakurgaon (India)
- Coordinates: 19.2707194°N 73.0988151°E
- Country: India
- State: Maharashtra
- District: Thane
- Taluka: Bhiwandi
- Elevation: 7 m (23 ft)

Population (2011)
  - Total: 2,259
- Time zone: UTC+5:30 (IST)
- 2011 census code: 552654

Thakurgaon is a village in the Thane district of Maharashtra, India. It is located in the Bhiwandi taluka.

== Demographics ==
The village covers a total geographical area of 37 hectares. According to the 2011 census of India, Thakurgaon has 652 households. The effective literacy rate (i.e. the literacy rate of population excluding children aged 6 and below) is 84.01%.

Demographics (2011 Census)
	Total	Male	Female
Population	2259	1321	938
Children aged below 6 years	326	167	159
Scheduled caste	18	13	5
Scheduled tribe	46	31	15
Literates	1624	1024	600
Workers (all)	964	916	48
Main workers (total)	837	801	36
Main workers: Cultivators	62	57	5
Main workers: Agricultural labourers	26	21	5
Main workers: Household industry workers	33	30	3
Main workers: Other	716	693	23
Marginal workers (total)	127	115	12
Marginal workers: Cultivators	6	1	5
Marginal workers: Agricultural labourers	1	1	0
Marginal workers: Household industry workers	0	0	0
Marginal workers: Others	120	113	7
Non-workers	1295	405	890
