= Thakurgaon-1 =

Constituency of Bangladesh's Jatiya Sangsad

Coordinates: 26.09°N 88.28°E

- Constituency for the Jatiya Sangsad
- District: Thakurgaon District
- Division: Rangpur Division
- Electorate: 511,629 (2026)

Current constituency
- Created: 1984
- Party: Bangladesh Nationalist Party (BNP)
- Member: Mirza Faisal Amin
- ← 2 Panchagarh-2 4 Thakurgaon-2 →

Thakurgaon-1 is a constituency represented in the Jatiya Sangsad (National Parliament) of Bangladesh. Currently, the constituency remains vacant in the national parliament.

== Boundaries ==
The constituency encompasses Thakurgaon Sadar Upazila, Ruhia Upazila and Bhully Upazila.

== History ==
The constituency was created in 1984 when the former Dinajpur District was split into three districts: Panchagarh, Thakurgaon, and Dinajpur.

== Members of Parliament ==
Election	Member	Party
1986	Khademul Islam	Awami League
1988	Rezwanul Haque Idu Chowdhury	Jatiya Party
1991	Khademul Islam	Awami League
Feb 1996	Mirza Fakhrul Islam Alamgir	Bangladesh Nationalist Party
Jun 1996	Khademul Islam	Awami League
1997 by-election	Ramesh Chandra Sen	Awami League
2001	Mirza Fakhrul Islam Alamgir	Bangladesh Nationalist Party
2008	Ramesh Chandra Sen	Awami League
2014	Ramesh Chandra Sen	Awami League
2018	Ramesh Chandra Sen	Awami League
2024	Ramesh Chandra Sen	Awami League
2026	Mirza Fakhrul Islam Alamgir	Bangladesh Nationalist Party
2026 by-election	Mirza Faisal Amin	Bangladesh Nationalist Party

== Elections ==
=== Elections in the 2020s ===
Thakurgaon-1 by-election, October 2026
Party	Candidate	Votes	%	±%
BNP	Mirza Faisal Amin	2,27,917	69.27	+7.07
Jamaat	Delwar Hossain	96,513	29.33	−7.47
IAB	Md Khademul Islam	3,289	1.00	0
BKA	Md Abdul Alim Nizami	836	0.25	N/A
BCP	Hussain Muhammad Omar Faruk	450	0.14	N/A
Majority		131,404	39.94	+14.44
Turnout		329,005	63.74	−11.26
BNP hold				

General Election 2026: Thakurgaon-1
Party	Candidate	Votes	%	±%
BNP	Mirza Fakhrul Islam Alamgir	238,836	62.2	N/A
Jamaat	Delwar Hossain	141,017	36.8	N/A
IAB	Md. Khademul Islam	3,851	1.0	N/A
Majority		97,819	25.5	N/A
Turnout		383,704	75.0	N/A
Registered electors		511,629		
BNP gain from AL				

=== Elections in the 2010s ===
General Election 2014: Thakurgaon-1
Party	Candidate	Votes	%	±%
AL	Ramesh Chandra Sen	88,155	96.3	+37.3
WPB	Md. Imran Hossain Chowdhury	3,356	3.7	N/A
Majority		84,799	92.7	+73.8
Turnout		91,511	24.8	−66.7
AL hold				

=== Elections in the 2000s ===
General Election 2008: Thakurgaon-1
Party	Candidate	Votes	%	±%
AL	Ramesh Chandra Sen	177,101	59.0	+20.1
BNP	Mirza Fakhrul Islam Alamgir	120,411	40.1	−14.0
IAB	Md. A. Mazid	2,444	0.8	N/A
Majority		56,690	18.9	+3.7
Turnout		299,956	91.5	+4.5
AL gain from BNP				

General Election 2001: Thakurgaon-1
Party	Candidate	Votes	%	±%
BNP	Mirza Fakhrul Islam Alamgir	134,910	54.1	N/A
AL	Ramesh Chandra Sen	96,948	38.9	−26.8
IJOF	Md. Noore Alam Chowdhury	16,647	6.7	N/A
CPB	Syed Merajul Hossain	639	0.3	N/A
Majority		37,962	15.2	−17.0
Turnout		249,144	87.0	+36.5
BNP gain from AL				

=== Elections in the 1990s ===
Khademul Islam died in December 1996. Ramesh Chandra Sen was elected in a February 1997 by-election.

Thakurgaon-1 by-election, February 1997
Party	Candidate	Votes	%	±%
AL	Ramesh Chandra Sen	78,208	65.7	+31.4
JP(E)	Md. Z. H. N. Islam	39,843	33.4	+10.1
Bangladesh Krishak Sramik Mukti Andolon (Note: Bangladesh Krishak Sramik Mukti Andolon (lit. Bangladesh Peasants Workers Liberation Movement))	Mohammad Sadek	1,070	0.9	N/A
Majority		38,365	32.2	+29.8
Turnout		119,121	50.5	−26.9
AL hold				

General Election June 1996: Thakurgaon-1
Party	Candidate	Votes	%	±%
AL	Khademul Islam	62,709	34.3	−5.4
BNP	Mirza Fakhrul Islam Alamgir	58,369	32.0	+6.9
JP(E)	Md. Nurul Haque	42,609	23.3	+8.8
Jamaat	Md. Rafiqul Islam	17,242	9.4	−9.1
Zaker Party	Md. Jaherul Haque Chowdhury	923	0.5	−0.3
CPB	Syed Merajul Hossain	716	0.4	N/A
Majority		4,340	2.4	−12.2
Turnout		182,568	77.4	+11.3
AL hold				

General Election 1991: Thakurgaon-1
Party	Candidate	Votes	%	±%
AL	Khademul Islam	57,535	39.7	
BNP	Mirza Fakhrul Islam Alamgir	36,406	25.1	
Jamaat	Md. Rafiqul Islam	26,800	18.5	
JP(E)	Rezwanul Haque	21,051	14.5	
Zaker Party	Md. Shahidul Islam	1,150	0.8	
BAKSAL	Md. Manjur Rahman	832	0.6	
JSD (Rab)	Md. Mansur Ali	648	0.4	
Independent	Atiqul Islam Atik	428	0.3	
Majority		21,129	14.6	
Turnout		144,850	66.1	
AL gain from JP(E)				
