= Ramesh Chandra Sen =

Bangladeshi politician (1940–2026)

- রমেশ চন্দ্র সেন
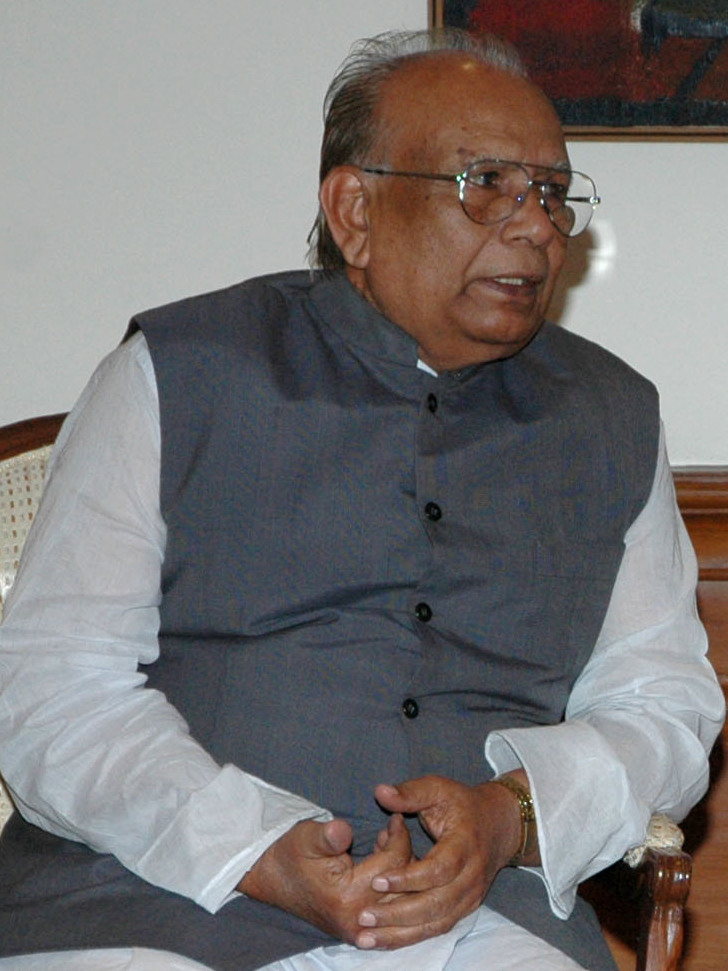
- Sen in 2010

Member of the Bangladesh Parliament for Thakurgaon-1
- In office 25 January 2009 – 6 August 2024
- Preceded by: Mirza Fakhrul Islam Alamgir
- Succeeded by: Mirza Fakhrul Islam Alamgir

Minister of Water Resources
- In office 25 January 2009 – 24 January 2014
- Preceded by: Hafizuddin Ahmed
- Succeeded by: Anwar Hossain Manju

Personal details
- Born: 30 April 1940 Thakurgaon District, Bengal Province, British India
- Died: 7 February 2026 (aged 85) Dinajpur, Bangladesh
- Party: Bangladesh Awami League
- Education: Carmichael College
- Occupation: Politician

Ramesh Chandra Sen (30 April 1940 – 7 February 2026) was a Bangladeshi politician who was a Jatiya Sangsad member representing the Thakurgaon-1 constituency from 2009 to 2024, and the Minister of Water Resources from 2009 to 2014.

== Early life ==
Sen was born at Mondaladum village at Ruhia Union in Thakurgaon District in the then Bengal Province, British India (now in Bangladesh), on 30 April 1940, to Balashoree Sen and Khitindra Mohan Sen. He passed his B.com degree from Carmichael College, Rangpur in 1963.

== Career ==
Sen was elected a Jatiya Sangsad member representing the Thakurgaon-1 constituency in the 7th and the 9th national parliamentary election in 1996 and 2008. He was the chairman of parliamentary standing committee on water resources ministry. He was the Presidium member of Bangladesh Awami League.

On 16 August 2024, Sen was arrested after the fall of the Sheikh Hasina-led Awami League government. He was sent to Dinajpur District Jail the next day.

== Death ==
Sen became unwell at Dinajpur District Jail on the morning of 7 February 2026. He was taken to Dinajpur Medical College Hospital, where the on-duty doctor declared him dead around 9:30 am. He was 85.
