= Thakurgaon =

- Town and Municipality
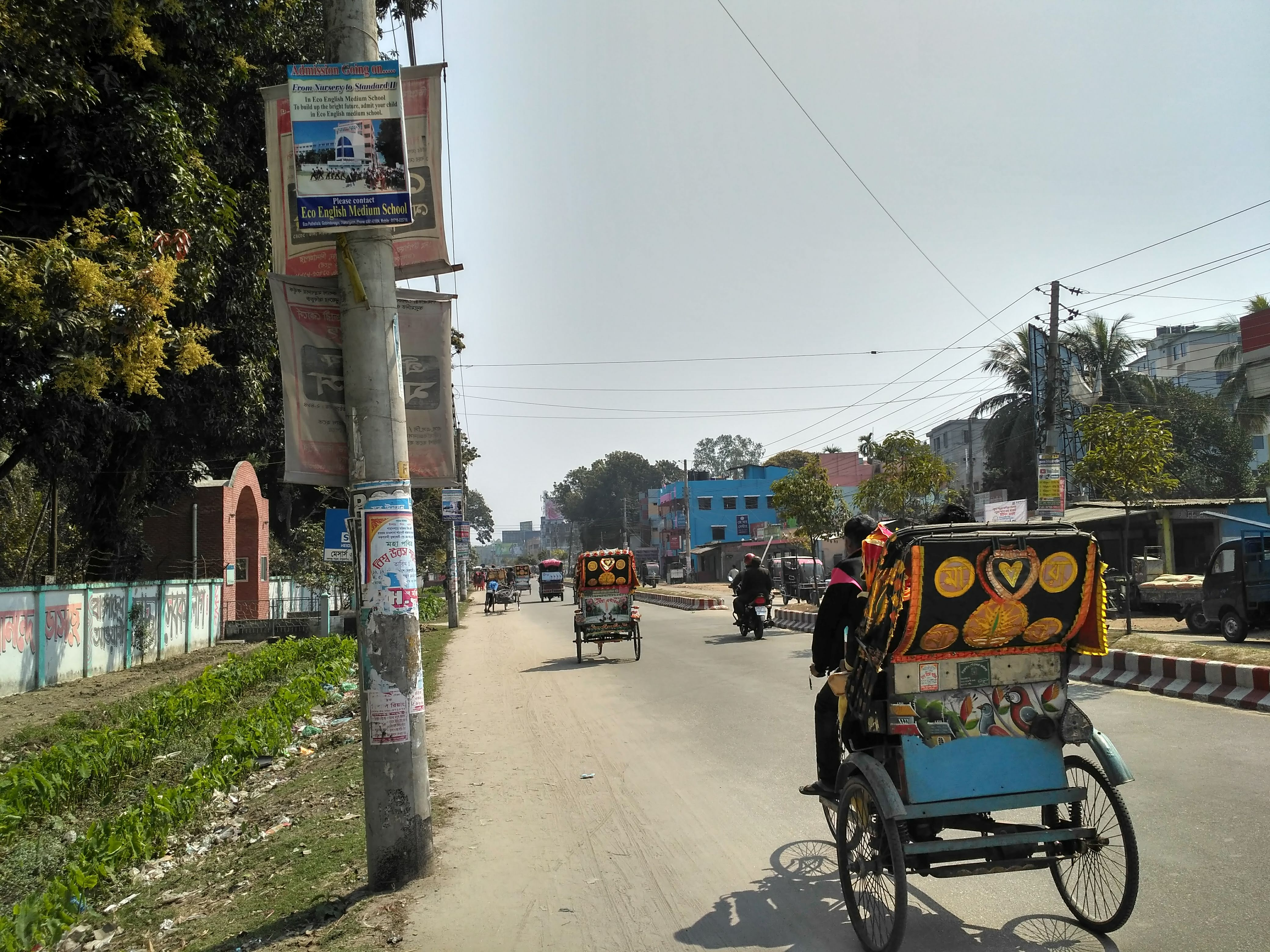
- Thakurgaon

- Location in Rangpur division Location in Bangladesh
- Coordinates: 26°01′55″N 88°27′58″E
- Country: Bangladesh
- Division: Rangpur
- District: Thakurgaon
- Upazila: Thakurgaon Sadar

Population (2022)
  - Total: 100,459

Thakurgaon is a municipality and city in northern Bangladesh. It is the headquarters of Thakurgaon District and Thakurgaon Sadar Upazila.

== History ==
The place now known as Thakurgaon was historically recorded as "Nishchintapur", and 16th century Kochbihar mapping places Nishchintapur on the east bank of the Tangon River and Thakurgaon on the west. According to local tradition, the new name derives from a Chakraborty family residence known as Thakurbari, which lent its name to the locality. A British-period police outpost (thana) named Thakurgaon was established in the early nineteenth century and was later relocated east of the river. The area was constituted as Thakurgaon Subdivision in 1860 and was elevated to district status on 1 February 1984.

== Demographics ==
Religions in Thakurgaon (2011)
| Religion | Percent |
| Islam | 87.42% |
| Hinduism | 11.23% |
| Christianity | 0.47% |
| Other or not stated | 0.88% |

According to the 2022 Bangladesh census, Thakurgaon city had a population of 100,459 and a literacy rate of 88.42%.

According to the 2011 Bangladesh census, Thakurgaon city had 18,015 households and a population of 80,589. 15,167 (18.82%) were under 10 years of age. Thakurgaon had a literacy rate (age 7 and over) of 74.33%, compared to the national average of 51.8%, and a sex ratio of 956 females per 1000 males. The ethnic population was 958 (1.19%).
