= Thakurgaon Sadar Upazila =

Thakurgaon Sadar ঠাকুরগাঁও সদর
- Upazila
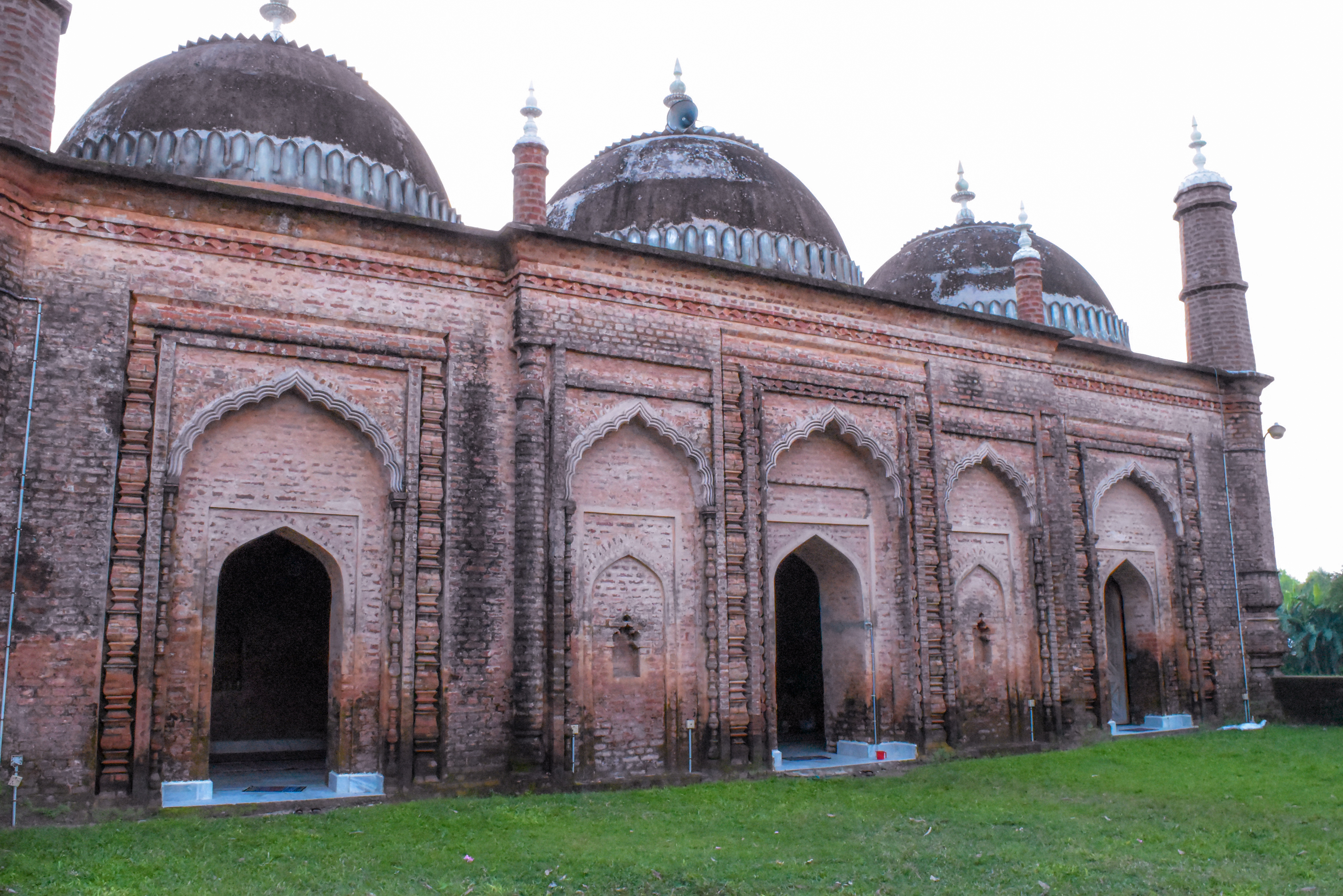
- Balia Mosque

- Coordinates: 26°1.2′N 88°28′E
- Country: Bangladesh
- Division: Rangpur
- District: Thakurgaon
- Headquarters: Thakurgaon

Area
  - Total: 654.95 km^{2} (252.88 sq mi)

Population (2022)
  - Total: 656,792
  - Density: 1,002.8/km^{2} (2,597.3/sq mi)
- Time zone: UTC+6 (BST)
- Postal code: 5100
- Area code: 0561
- Website: thakurgaonsadar.thakurgaon.gov.bd

Thakurgaon Sadar Upazila mauza geocode map

Thakurgaon Sadar (Bengali: ঠাকুরগাঁও সদর) is an upazila of Thakurgaon District in Rangpur, Bangladesh.

== Geography ==
Thakurgaon Sadar is located at 26.0208°N 88.4667°E. It has a total area of 654.95 km^{2}. It is bounded by Atwari and Boda upazilas on the north, Pirganj and Birganj upazilas on the south, Boda, Debiganj and Birganj upazilas on the east, Baliadangi and Ranisankail upazilas on the west.

== Demographics ==
According to the 2022 Bangladeshi census, Thakurgaon Sadar Upazila had 162,239 households and a population of 656,792. 9.20% of the population were under 5 years of age. Thakurgaon Sadar had a literacy rate (age 7 and over) of 76.85%: 80.86% for males and 72.86% for females, and a sex ratio of 100.48 males for every 100 females. 144,767 (22.04%) lived in urban areas.

According to the 2011 Census of Bangladesh, Thakurgaon Sadar Upazila had 133,320 households and a population of 581,227. 130,768 (22.50%) were under 10 years of age. Thakurgaon Sadar had a literacy rate (age 7 and over) of 53.27%, compared to the national average of 51.8%, and a sex ratio of 980 females per 1000 males. 93,213 (16.04%) lived in urban areas. Ethnic population was 3,721 (0.64%), of which Santal were 2,256.

According to the 2001 Bangladesh census, Thakurgaon sadar upazila has a population of 504428; males 260515, females 243913; Muslim 369486, Hindu 129794, Christian 3614, Buddhist 38 and others 1496. Indigenous communities such as Santal, Oraon, Munda, Mushar and Rajbanshi belong to this upazila.

As of the 1991 Bangladesh census, the upazila has a population of 422,728. Males constitute 51.7% of the population, and females 48.3%. This upazila's eighteen up population is 214,112. Thakurgaon Sadar has an average literacy rate of 30.1% (7+ years), and the national average of 32.4% literate.

=== Ethnicity and religion ===
Religions in Thakurgaon Sadar Upazila (2022)
Religion	Percent
Islam	74.82%
Hinduism	24.38%
Christianity	0.61%
Other or not stated	0.19%

Population by religion in Union/Paurashava
Upazila	Muslim	Hindu	Others
Thakurgaon Paurashava	87,754	11,831	874
Akcha Union	12,163	13,861	372
Akhanagar Union	15,538	2,542	22
Auliapur Union	19,130	9,213	207
Balia Union	24,545	6,165	288
Baragaon Union	10,524	4,475	41
Begunbari Union	17,337	4,475	160
Chilarang Union	20,718	4,428	178
Debipur Union	19,764	7,466	294
Dholarhat Union	6,909	7,985	222
Gareya Union	22,420	12,115	1
Jagannathpur Union	24,285	12,539	186
Jamalpur Union	24,153	6,808	23
Mohammadpur Union	16,401	4,198	84
Nargun Union	18,308	2,607	603
Rahimanpur Union	30,221	6,332	166
Rajagaon Union	14,167	5,112	154
Raypur Union	20,959	7,334	58
Ruhia Union	20,236	3,220	399
Ruhia Pashchim Union	11,345	5,096	262
Salandar Union	30,702	8,181	442
Senua Union	7,773	1,649	171
Shukhan Pukhri Union	16,061	10,828	10

🟩 Muslim majority 🟧 Hindu majority

Population of upazila by ethnicity (2022)
1. Bengali (98.3%)
2. Barman (0.99%)
3. Others (0.66%)

Bengali Muslims are the majority, while Bengali Hindus are majority in two unions. Ethnic population was 10816 (1.65%) of which Barman were 6,522, Santal 1,806 and Koch 1,150.

== Administration ==
UNO: Belayet Hossain

Thakurgaon Sadar thana was formed in 1800 and it was turned into an upazila in 1984.

Thakurgaon Upazila is divided into Thakurgaon Municipality and 19 union parishads: Akhanagar, Akcha, Auliapur, Balia, Baragaon, Begunbari, Chilarang, Debipur, Gareya, Jagannathpur, Jamalpur, Mohammadpur, Nargun, Rahimanpur, Rajagaon, Ruhea, Roypur, Salandar, and Sukhanpukhari. The union parishads are subdivided into 194 mauzas and 198 villages.

== Gallery ==
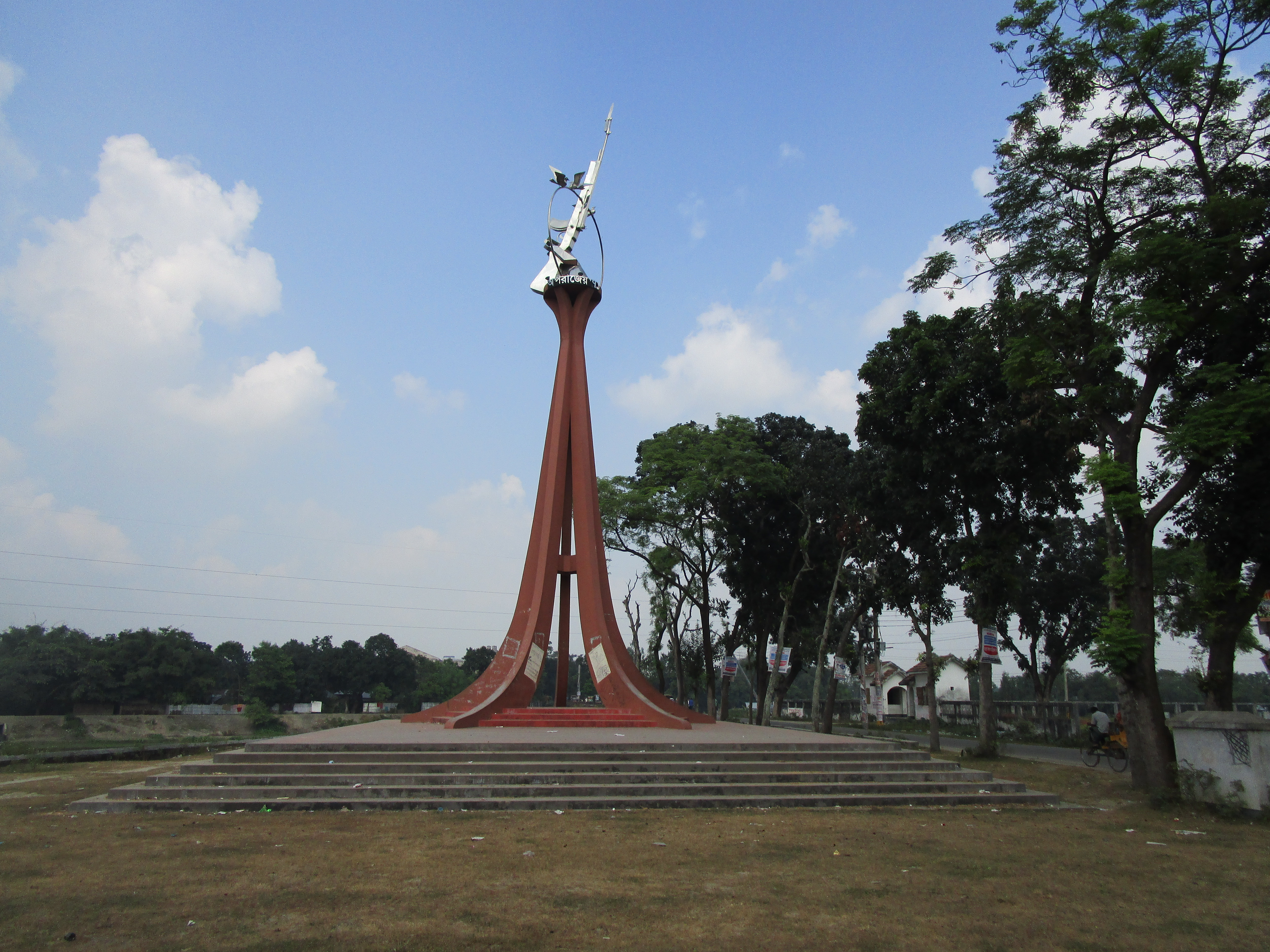
The Monument of 1971 War beside Tangon River

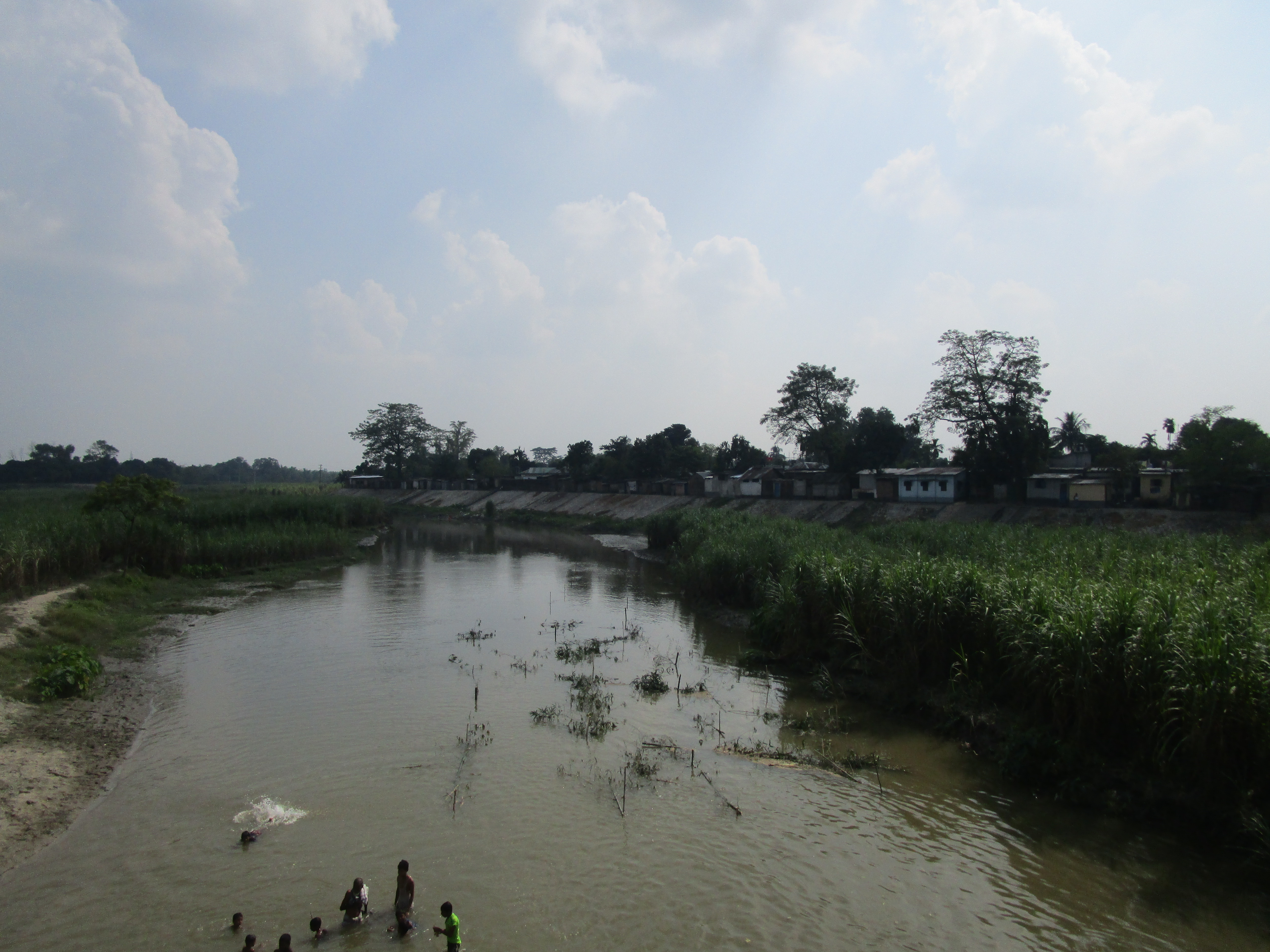
Shuk River at Thakurgaon Sadar Upazila

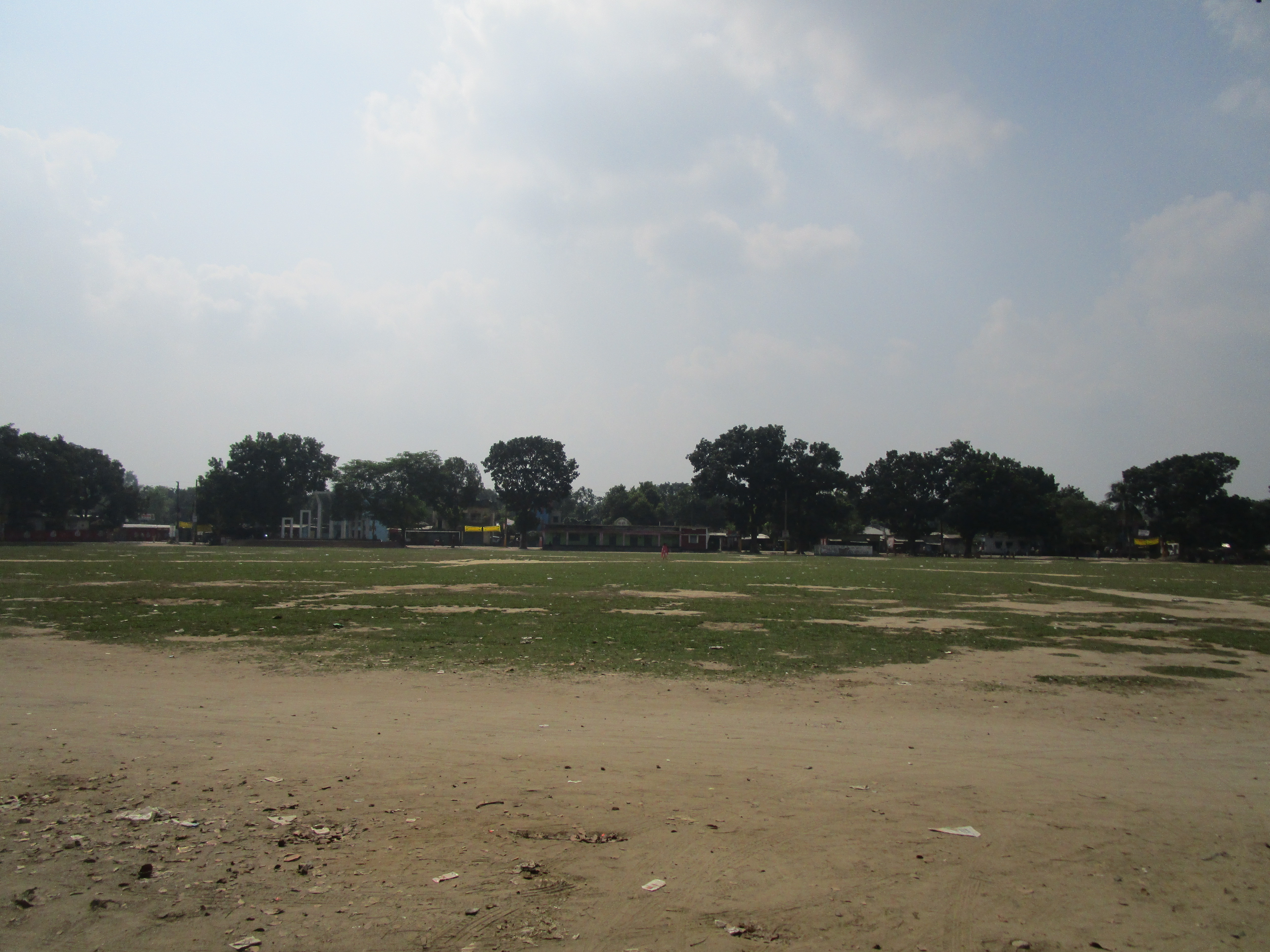
Playground of Thakurgaon

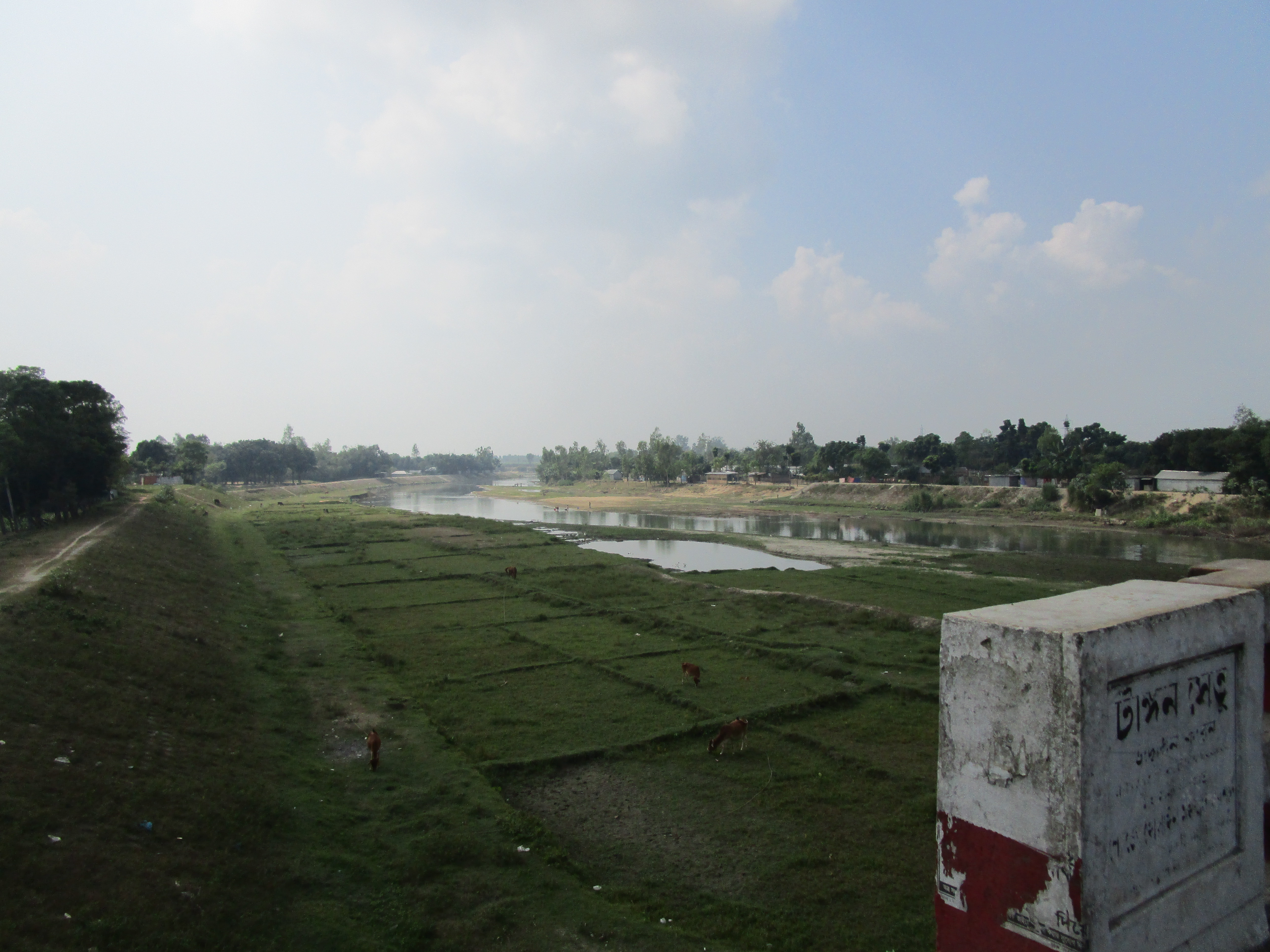
Tangon River from Tangon Bridge

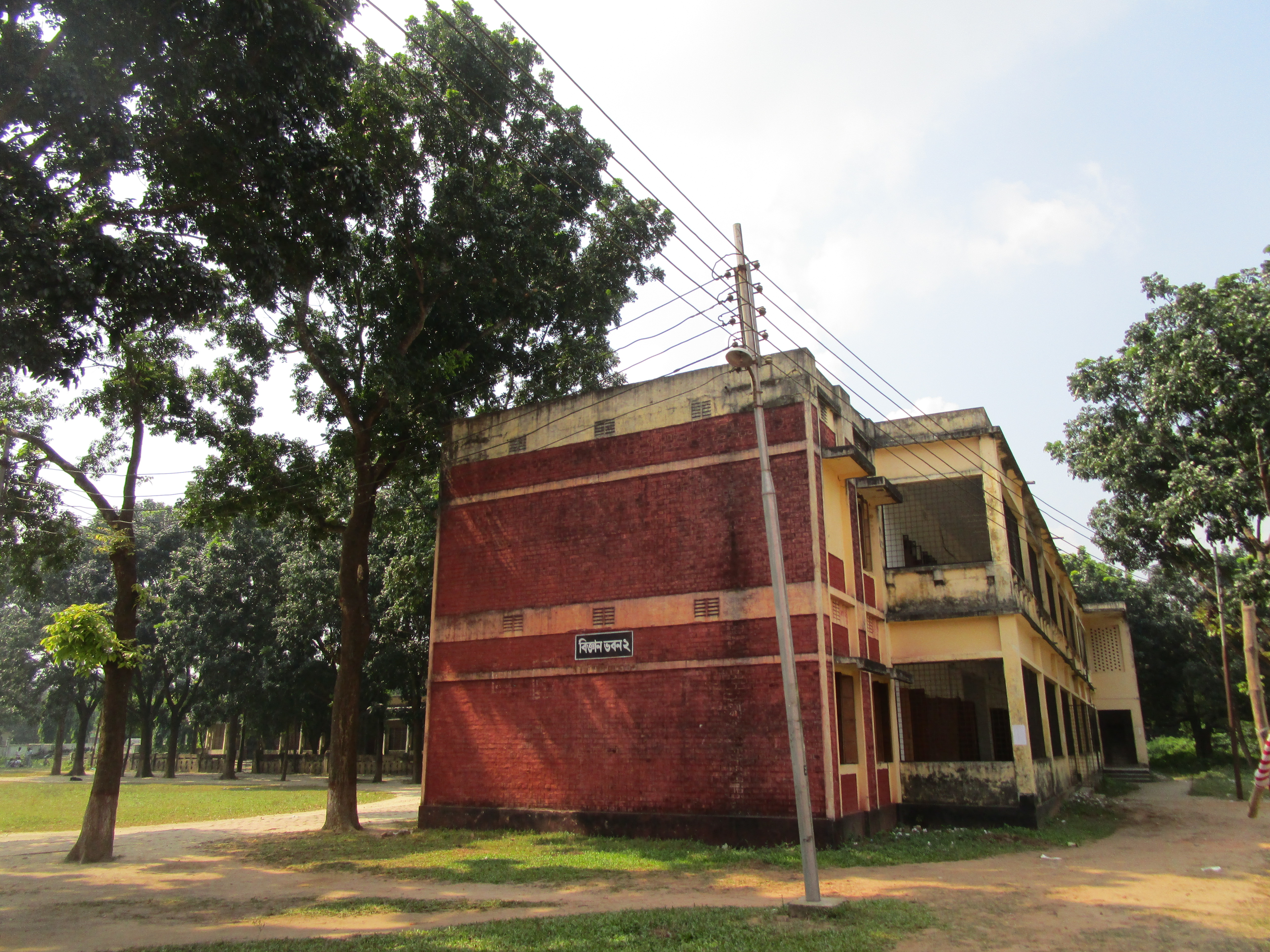
A science building of Thakurgaon Govt.College.

== See also ==
- Upazilas of Bangladesh
- Districts of Bangladesh
- Divisions of Bangladesh
- Upazila
- Administrative geography of Bangladesh
