= Ruhia Upazila =

Ruhia রুহিয়া
- Upazila
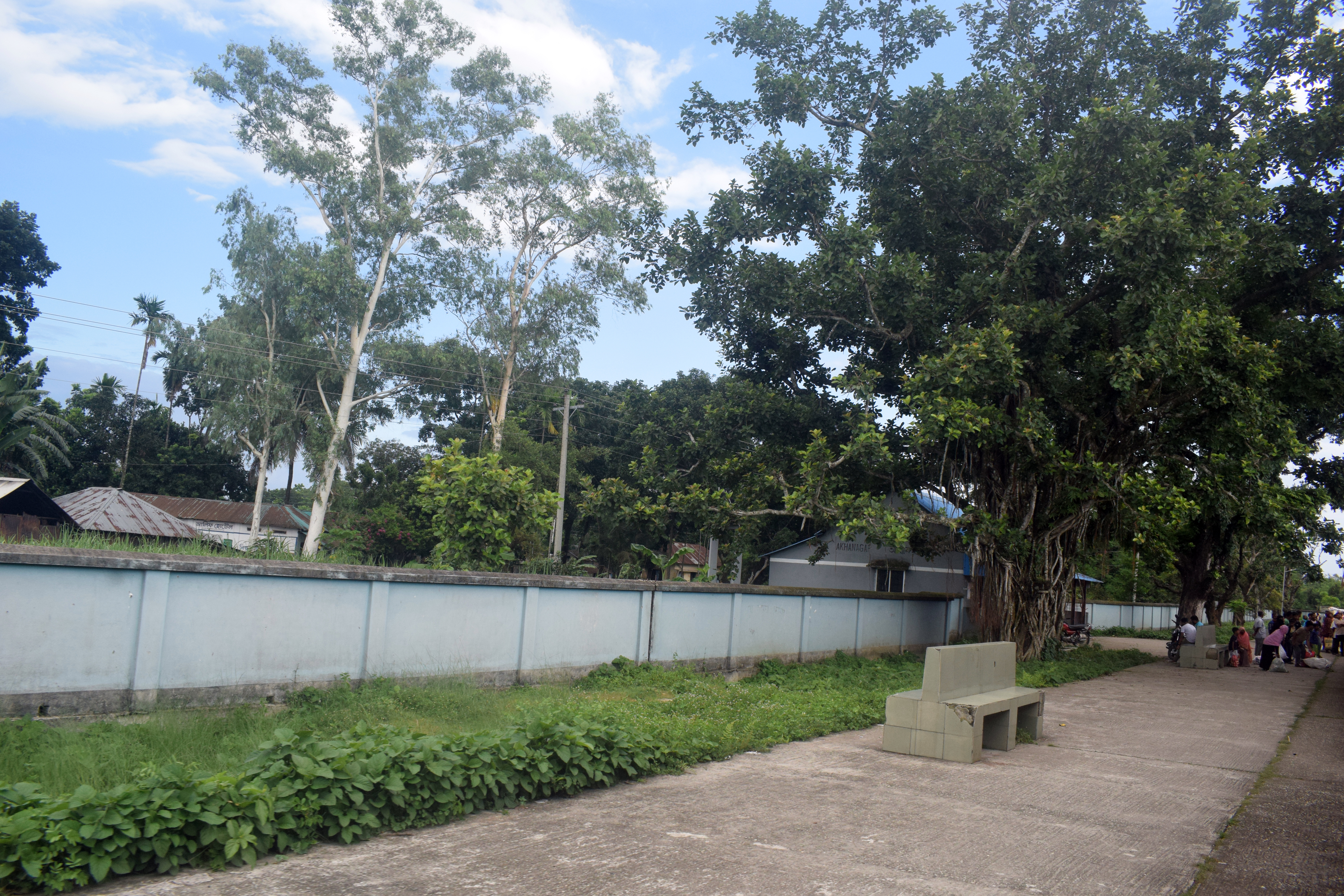
- Road in Ruhia Upazila near Akhanagar Railway Station

- Location in Bangladesh
- Country: Bangladesh
- Division: Rangpur
- District: Thakurgaon
- Established: 7 May 2026
- Headquarters: Ruhia
- Time zone: UTC+6 (BST)

Ruhia (Bengali: রুহিয়া) is an administrative upazila in the Thakurgaon District of Rangpur Division, Bangladesh. It was officially approved as an upazila by the National Implementation Committee for Administrative Reorganization (NICAR) on 7 May 2026.

== History ==
Previously, Ruhia functioned as a police station (Thana) under Thakurgaon Sadar Upazila. Following long-standing local demands for decentralization and better administrative reach, the government upgraded the police station to a full-fledged upazila status in May 2026. This administrative change was part of a larger government initiative that saw the creation of five new upazilas across Bangladesh on the same day.

== Administration ==
Ruhia Upazila consists of six Union Parishads, which were formerly part of the Ruhia Thana jurisdiction:

- Ruhia Union
- Akhanagar Union
- Rajagaon Union
- Ruhia Paschim Union
- Dholarhat Union
- Senua Union

The upazila falls under the Thakurgaon-1 parliamentary constituency.

== Representation ==
Constituency	National Area	Member of Parliament	Party
Thakurgaon-1	Ruhia, Bhully, and Thakurgaon Sadar	Mirza Faisal Amin	BNP

== See also ==
- Upazilas of Bangladesh
- Thakurgaon District
- Bhully Upazila
