= Baliadangi Upazila =

Baliadangi বালিয়াডাঙ্গী
- Upazila
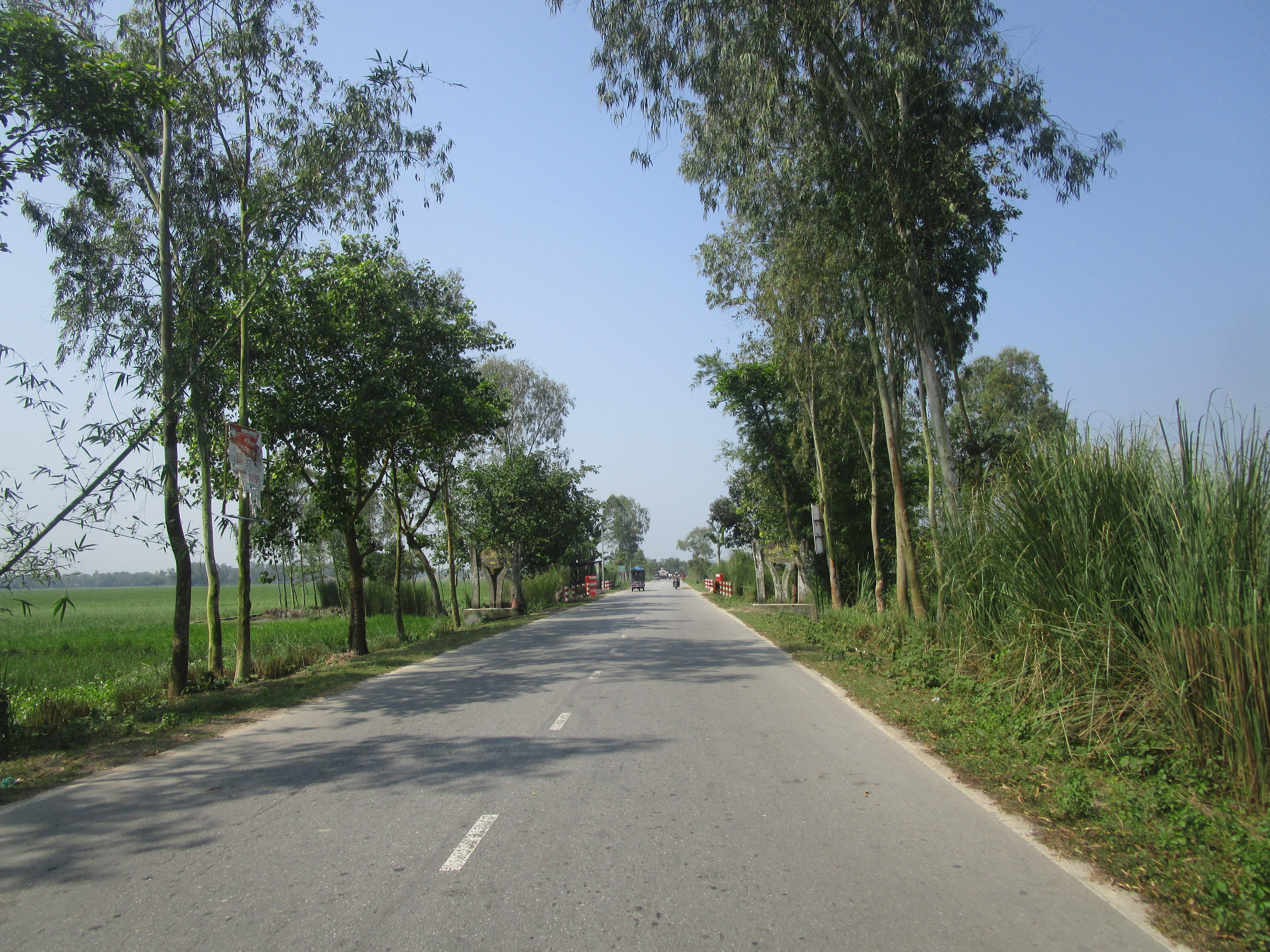
- Road in Baliadangi Upazila

- Coordinates: 26°6′N 88°16.5′E
- Country: Bangladesh
- Division: Rangpur
- District: Thakurgaon

Area
  - Total: 284.13 km^{2} (109.70 sq mi)

Population (2022)
  - Total: 208,350
  - Density: 733.29/km^{2} (1,899.2/sq mi)
- Time zone: UTC+6 (BST)
- Postal code: 5140
- Website: baliadangi.thakurgaon.gov.bd

Baliadangi Upazila mauza geocode map

Baliadangi (Bengali: বালিয়াডাঙ্গী) is an upazila of Thakurgaon district in Rangpur Division, Bangladesh.

== Geography ==
Baliadangi is located at 26.1000°N 88.2750°E. It has a total area of 284.13 km^{2}.

Baliadangi upazila is bounded by Atwari Upazila in Panchagarh district in the north, Thakurgaon Sadar Upazila in the east, Ranisankail Upazila in the south and Goalpokhar I and Islampur CD blocks in Uttar Dinajpur district, West Bengal, India, on the west.

== Demographics ==
Historical population
Year	Pop. (000)	±%
1981	123	—
1991	147	+19.5%
2001	170	+15.6%
2011	195	+14.7%
2022	208	+6.7%
Source: Bangladesh Bureau of Statistics

According to the 2022 Bangladeshi census, Baliadangi Upazila had 52,437 households and a population of 208,350. 9.37% of the population were under 5 years of age. Baliadangi had a literacy rate (age 7 and over) of 70.95%: 75.91% for males and 66.01% for females, and a sex ratio of 101.02 males for every 100 females. 31,437 (15.09%) lived in urban areas.

According to the 2011 Census of Bangladesh, Baliadangi upazila had 45,509 households and a population of 195,049. 47,918 (24.57%) were under 10 years of age. Baliadangi had a literacy rate (age 7 and over) of 43.35%, compared to the national average of 51.8%, and a sex ratio of 975 females per 1000 males. 15,346 (7.87%) lived in urban areas.

As of the 1991 Bangladesh census, Baliadangi has a population of 147,163. Males constituted 51.32% of the population, and females 48.68%. This upazila's eighteen up population is 72,500. Baliadangi had an average literacy rate of 23.8% (7+ years), and the national average of 32.4% literate.

=== Religion ===
Religions in Baliadangi Upazila (2022)
Religion	Percent
Islam	80.00%
Hinduism	19.23%
Christianity	0.73%
Other or not stated	0.04%

Population by religion in Union
Union	Muslim	Hindu	Others
Amjankhore Union	21,322	4,151	165
Bara Palashbari Union	24,805	1,404	85
Barabari Union	22,582	4,186	182
Bhanor Union	21,720	4,065	277
Charol Union	19,207	7,530	365
Dhantala Union	11,669	12,400	318
Duosuo Union	26,656	1,282	86
Paria Union	18,724	5,054	105

🟩 Muslim majority 🟧 Hindu majority

== Administration ==
UNO: Mofizur Rahman

Baliadangi, primarily formed as a thana in 1806, was turned into an upazila on 2 July 1983.

The upazila is divided into eight union parishads: Amjankhore, Bara Palashbari, Barabari, Bhanor, Charol, Dhantala, Duosuo, and Paria. The union parishads are subdivided into 78 mauzas and 78 villages.

== College ==
1. Government Shahid Akbar Ali Science and Technology College

2. Somiruddin Smrity College

3. Lahiri Degree College

4. Kalmegh R Ali School and College

== See also ==
- Upazilas of Bangladesh
- Districts of Bangladesh
- Divisions of Bangladesh
