= Thakurgaon District =

District of Rangpur Division in Bangladesh

Thakurgaon District ঠাকুরগাঁও জেলা
- District of Bangladesh
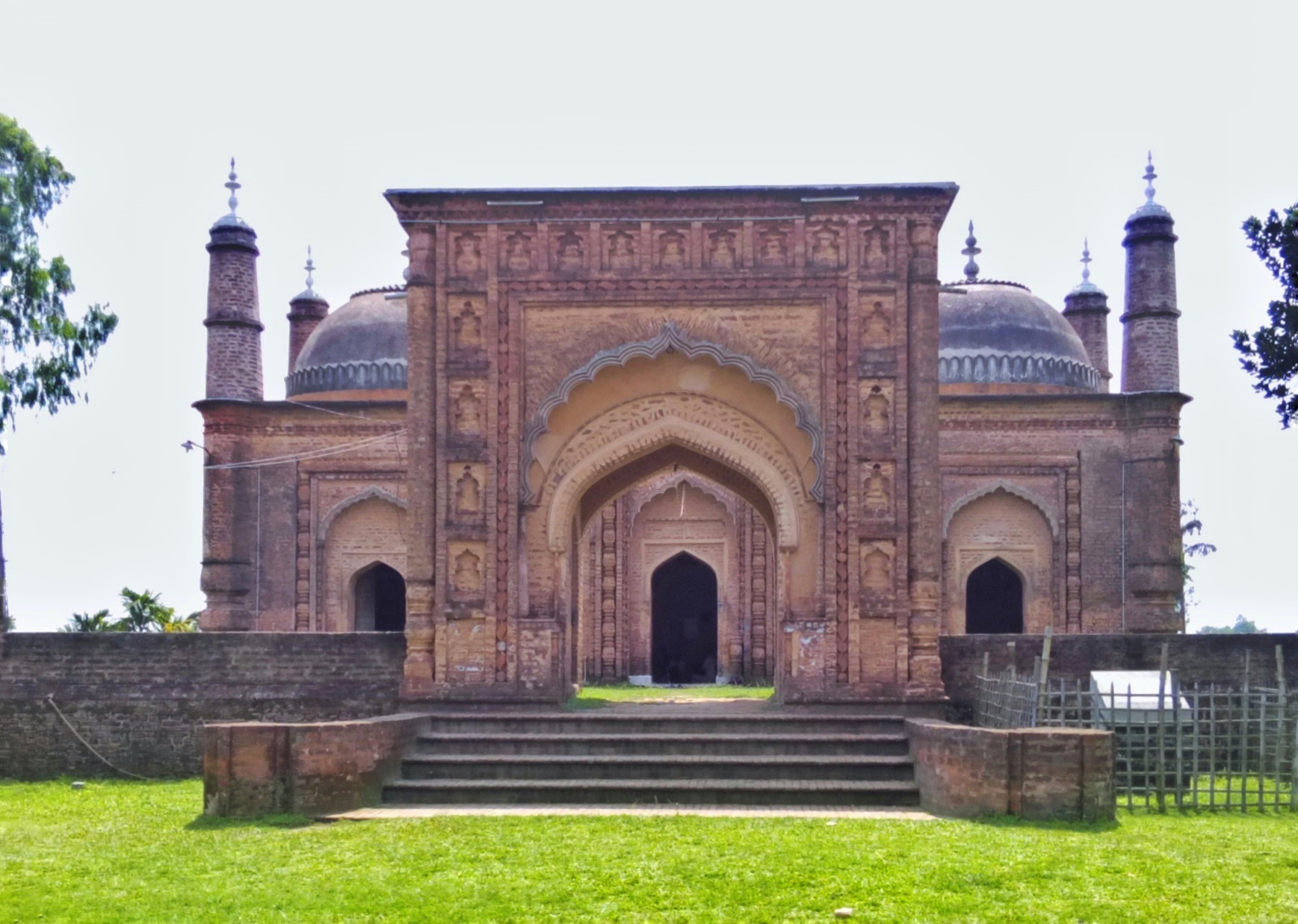
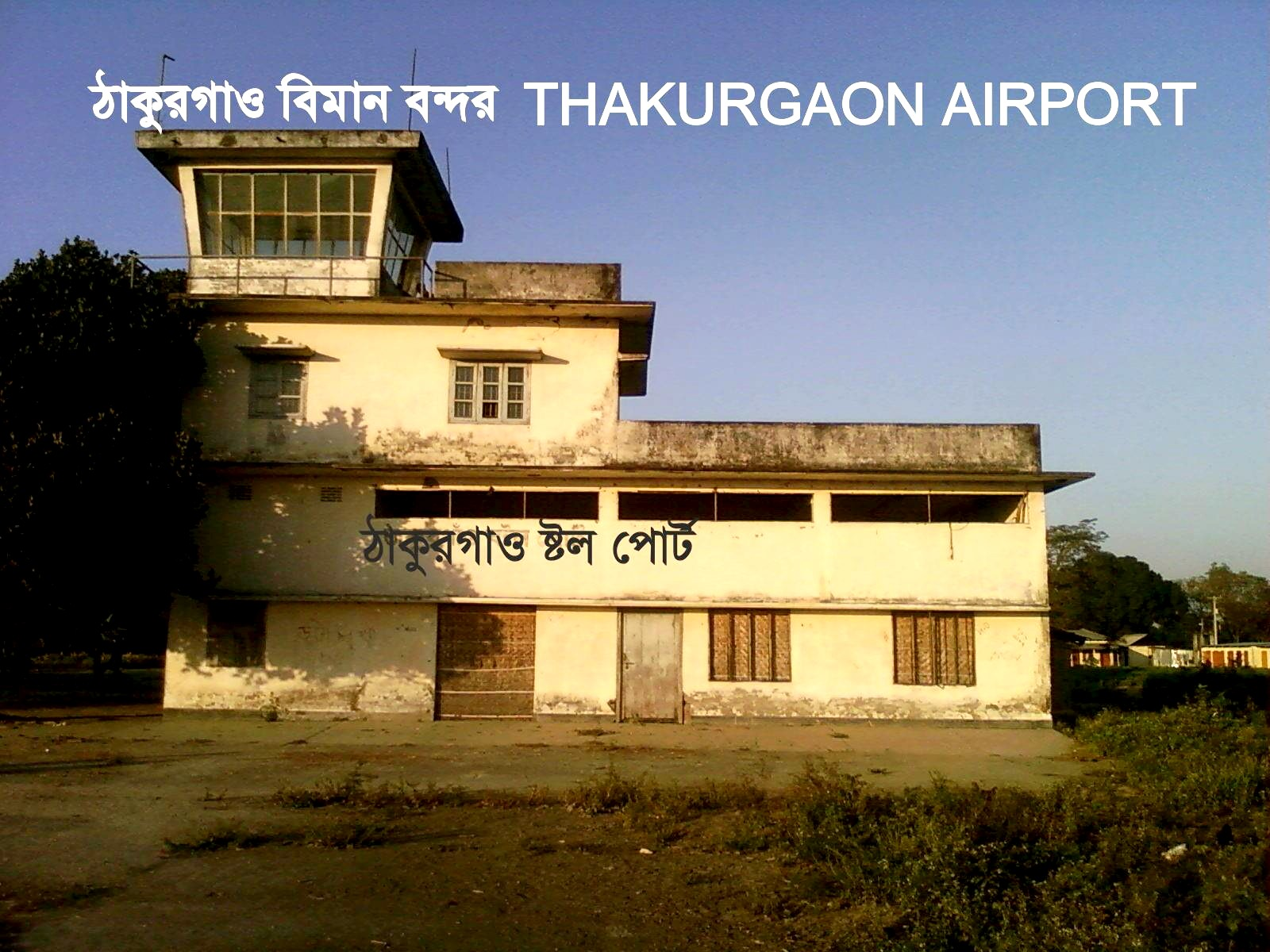
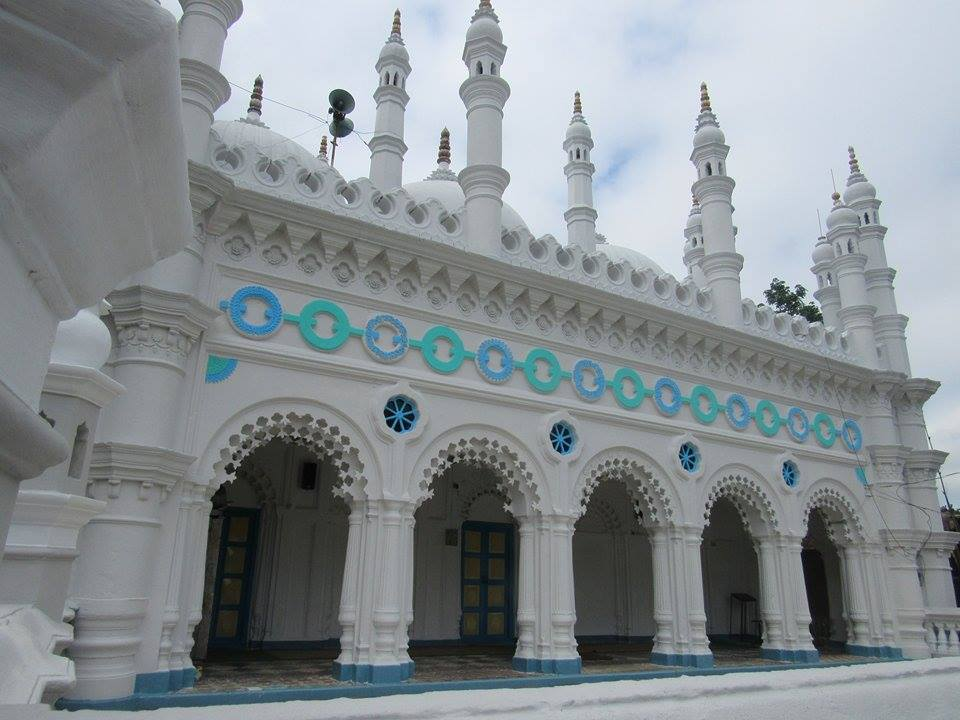
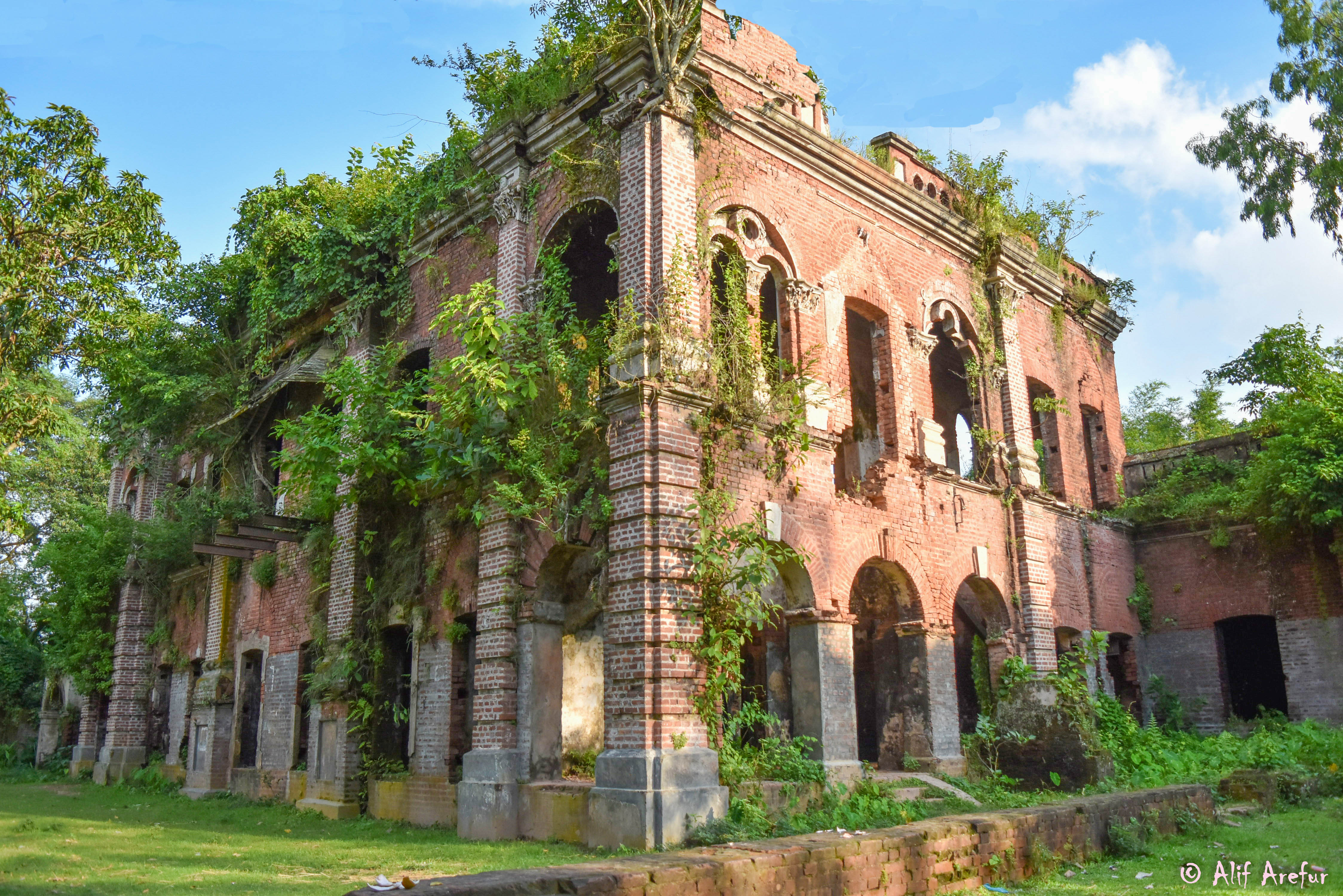
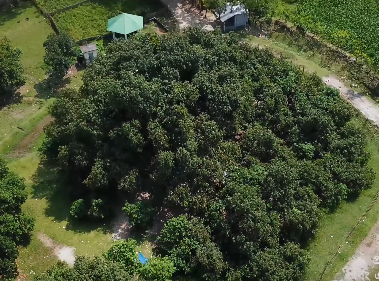
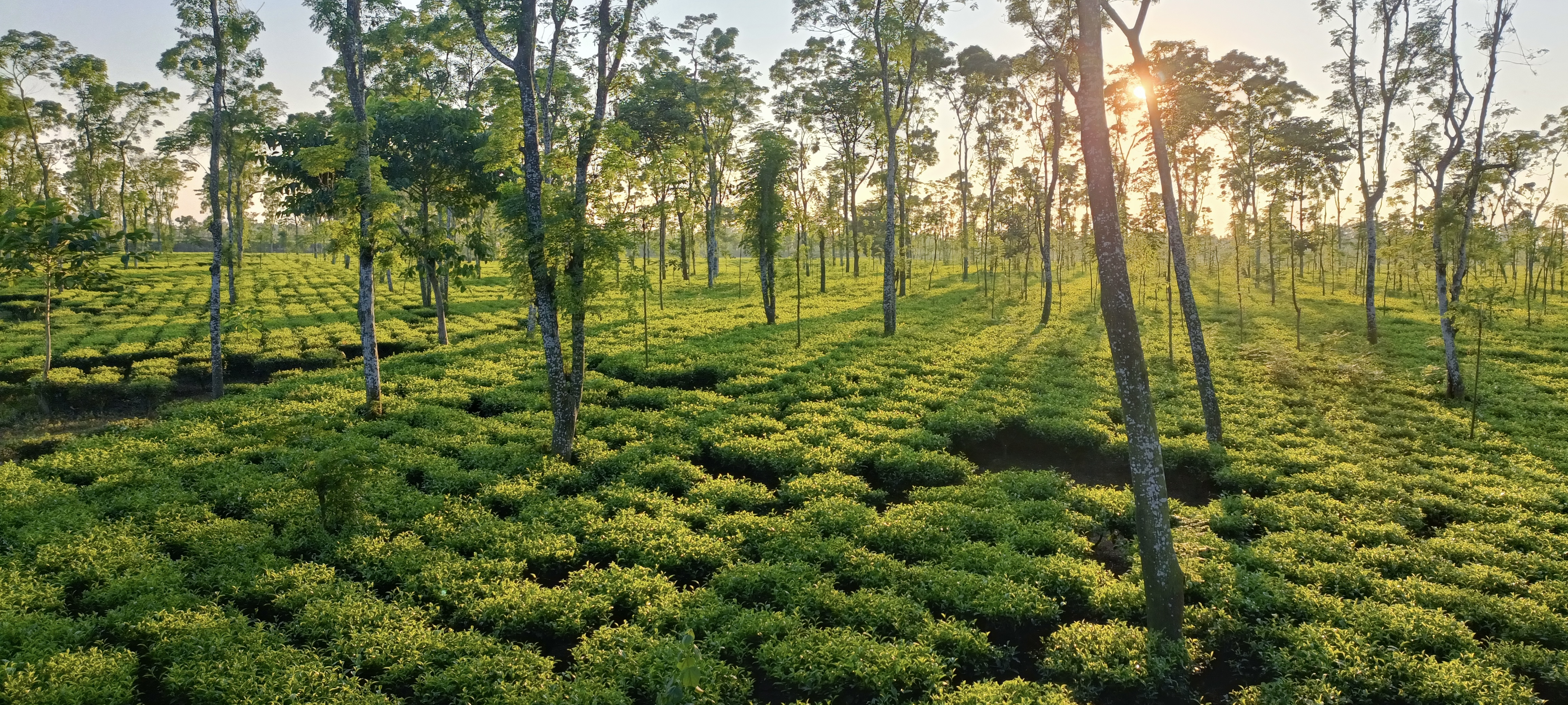
- Balia Mosque Thakurgaon Airport Jamalpur Jamia Masjid Rajbari at Ranisankail Upazila Biggest mango tree of Asia in Baliadangi Upazila Tea garden in Baliadangi Upazila

- Location of Thakurgaon District in Bangladesh
- Expandable map of Thakurgaon District
- Coordinates: 25.95°N 88.25°E
- Country: Bangladesh
- Division: Rangpur Division
- Established: 1 February 1984
- Headquarters: Thakurgaon

Government
  - Deputy Commissioner: Mohammad Rafiqul Huq

Area
  - Total: 1,809.52 km^{2} (698.66 sq mi)

Population (2022)
  - Total: 1,533,276
  - Density: 847.339/km^{2} (2,194.60/sq mi)
- Time zone: UTC+06:00 (BST)
- Postal code: 5100
- Area code: 0561
- ISO 3166 code: BD-64
- HDI (2018): 0.614 medium · 7th of 21

Thakurgaon District upazila geocode map

Thakurgaon District (Bengali: ঠাকুরগাঁও জেলা) is a district located in the northwestern region of Bangladesh under the administrative jurisdiction of Rangpur Division. The district is bordered by Panchagarh District to the north and east, Dinajpur District to the east, and the Indian state of West Bengal to the south and west.

== Administration ==
The administrative origin of the district date back in 1793, when Thakurgaon Police Station was established. In 1860, It was upgraded into a Subdivision (Mahakuma) of Dinajpur District, comprising six police stations: Thakurgaon Sadar, Pirganj, Ranisankail, Haripur, Baliadangi, and Atwari. Following the partition of British India in 1947, four more police stations: Boda, Panchagarh, Tetulia and Debiganj from the Jalpaiguri district of India were incorporated into the Thakurgaon subdivision. On 1 January 1981, Panchagarh Mahakuma was established as a separate subdivision (Mahakuma) of Dinajpur district consisting of Panchagarh, Atwari, Boda, Tetulia and Debiganj. This administrative reorganization reduced the territorial area of Thakurgaon Subdivision. Subsequently, Thakurgaon was officially established as a district on 1 February 1984. Over time, rapid population growth and administrative expansion increased demands for further decentralization of local governance. On 7 May 2026, the Government of Bangladesh officially approved the formation of two new Subdistricts (Upazila) in Thakurgaon district — Ruhia and Bhully. With the establishment of these new administrative units, the total number of Subdistricts (Upazila) in the district increased from five to seven.. Thakurgaon District is administered by a Deputy Commissioner. For administrative purposes, the district is subdivided into seven Subdistricts (Upazilas), each of which is served by a corresponding Police Station (Thana).

The Subdistricts (Upazilas) of Thakurgaon District are:

1. Thakurgaon Sadar Upazila
2. Baliadangi Upazila
3. Ranisankail Upazila
4. Pirganj Upazila
5. Haripur Upazila
6. Ruhia Upazila
7. Bhully Upazila

== Etymology ==
While there was no evidence that Thakurgaon was once named Nishchintapur, assumptions were made based on the similarity between the names. The mausoleum and the name Nukchintapur were considered as potential references to Thakurgaon's earlier name, Nischintinpur. Yet, confirmation came when historical maps from the 17th century depicted two distinct locations: Atitkurgaon and Nishchintpur. Nishchintpur was positioned at the eastern end of Tanganni and partly on the west side of the Tangan river in the north-west. Thakurgaon was situated from the 4th to the 4th, indicating that the name of Thakurgaon's sadar was originally Nishchinpura at the eastern end of the Tangan river. Over time, Nishchinpura evolved into Thakurgaon, encompassing the entire subdivision initially known as Thathakuranga and later adopting the identity of the district.

Historical records reveal that the current district headquarters of Thakurgaon has its roots in a location 8 kilometers north of Akecha Union, where two brothers named Narayan Chakraborty and Satish Chakraborti resided. Known for their wealth and influence, the locals referred to their house as Thakurbari. Chakrabarti house eventually lent its name to the area, transitioning from Thakurbari to Thakurgaon. Recognizing the need for a police station, the Chakrabarti brothers sought approval from the British government, leading to the establishment of a police station in the early 1793s, named Thakurgaon thana. Subsequently, the thana was relocated to the Tangon river due to various reasons, and in 1860, Thakurgaon subdivision was formed with 10 thanas. The district, officially named Thakurgaon with five thanas, was marked on the map of Bangladesh on February 1, 1984. Despite its recent establishment as a district, the region boasts an ancient history and cultural significance.

== History ==
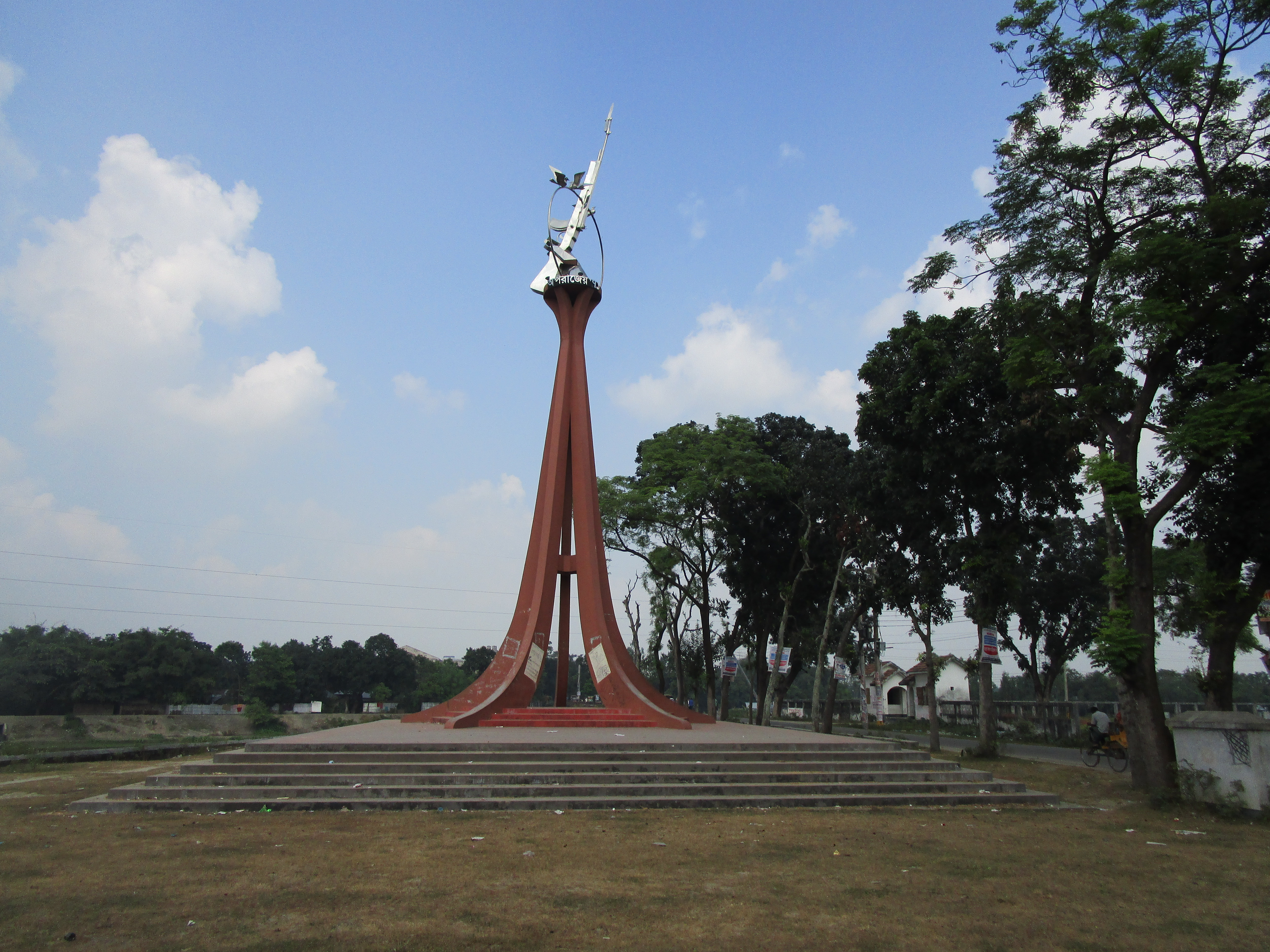
The Monument of 1971 War beside Tangon River.

During British rule Thakurgaon was a tehsil (a district subdivision). In 1947 at the time of the Partition of India, Thakurgaon Subdivision became part of the newly established Dinajpur District of East Bengal. In 1984, Thakurgaon subdivision was split off Dinajpur and became a separate district (i.e. Thakurgaon District). Before 1879, Thakurgaon District was ruled by Maithil Brahmin and Bengali Brahmin Thakurs like Bikhash Jha, Barun Thakur and Vidhenesh Roy. Most people believe Thakurgaon district has got its name from Barun Thakur.

During the British period in 1793, a Tagore family initiative led to the formation of Thangur, Shuk, Kulik, Patharaj, and Dhapa widows near the present municipality area. This gave rise to the Thakurgaon Thana, named after these entities. In 1860, it was declared as a sub-division with five police stations. In 1947, Thakurgaon became a subdivision, absorbing 10 thanas from Jalpaiguri district and one from Kotwihar. However, in 1981, Thakurgaon's geographical boundaries changed, resulting in five thanas in a separate Panchagarh district.

== Ethnography ==
The majority of Thakurgaon's population are ethnically Bengali Muslims. Hindus largely come from the many Bengali Hindu castes include Bengali Brahmins, Baidyas, Kshatriyas, Kayasthas and others. Other indigenous communities in the district include Koches, Rajbanshis, Paliyas and Santals.

The populations of Bangladesh exhibit varied physical traits, including long mouths, broad noses, and fall into three main categories: Longmund, Long and Middle Nasa, Egypto-Asiatic or Melanid, and specifically Golmund, Advanced Nasa, Alpine or Eastern Brachyd.

== Geography ==
The area of Thakurgaon is 1,809.52 square kilometres (698.66 sq mi). Thakurgaon is in the north west corner of Bangladesh, it is about 467 km from Dhaka, the capital of Bangladesh. It is surrounded by Dinajpur district on its south, Panchagarh district to the east and India on its west and north sides, it is a part of the Himalayan plain land. Highest average temperature of this district is 33.5 °C and lowest average is 10.05 °C.

== Demographics ==
Historical population
Year	Pop.	±% p.a.
1974	633,331	—
1981	817,732	+3.72%
1991	1,010,948	+2.14%
2001	1,214,376	+1.85%
2011	1,390,042	+1.36%
2022	1,533,895	+0.90%

According to the 2022 Census of Bangladesh, Thakurgaon District had 382,400 households and a population of 1,533,895, of whom, 18.58% of the inhabitants lived in urban areas. The population density was 861 people per km^{2}. 18.35% of the population was under 10 years of age. Thakurgaon had a literacy rate (age 7 and over) of 74.38%, compared to the national average of 74.80%, and a sex ratio of 100.48 males per 100 females.

Religions in Thakurgaon District (2022)
Religion	Percent
Islam	77.04%
Hinduism	22.14%
Christianity	0.63%
Other or not stated	0.19%

Religion in present-day Thakurgaon District
Religion	1941 (Note: 1941 figures are for Thakurgaon, Baliadangi, Ranisankail, Haripur and Pirganj thanas of erstwhile Dinajpur district, which roughly corresponds to the present district.)		1981		1991		2001		2011		2022	
Religion	Pop.	%	Pop.	%	Pop.	%	Pop.	%	Pop.	%	Pop.	%
Islam	183,554	53.96%	603,101	73.75%	757,951	74.97%	924,254	76.11%	1,066,176	76.70%	1,181,774	77.04%
Hinduism	150,366	44.20%	203,409	24.88%	243,088	24.05%	278,703	22.95%	309,423	22.26%	339,580	22.14%
Tribal religion (Note: In the 1941 census, all members of Scheduled Tribes were recorded as following 'Tribal' religion, irrespective of their actual practiced faith.)	5,618	1.65%	—N/a	—N/a	—N/a	—N/a	—N/a	—N/a	—N/a	—N/a	—N/a	—N/a
Christianity	453	0.13%	4,943	0.60%	5,449	0.54%	7,156	0.59%	7,897	0.57%	9,615	0.63%
Others (Note: Including Jainism, Buddhism, Zoroastrianism, Judaism, Ad-Dharmis, or not stated)	190	0.06%	6,279	0.77%	4,460	0.44%	4,263	0.35%	6,546	0.47%	2,926	0.19%
Total Population	340,181	100%	817,732	100%	1,010,948	100%	1,214,376	100%	1,390,042	100%	1,533,895	100%

Muslims make up 77.04% of the population, while Hindus are 22.14% and Christians 0.63% of the population.

The ethnic population in 2022 was 15,511 (1.01%), of which 6,534 were Barman, 5,781 Santal and 1,258 Koch. The majority of Hindus in the district are Bengali Hindus.

== Economy ==
In Bangladesh, agriculture serves as the foundation of the economy, and Thakurgaon has long been striving for economic productivity, with agriculture playing a significant role in the district's economy. Thakurgaon produces a variety of agricultural products, including rice, wheat, sugarcane, seasonal vegetables, and fruits. The sugarcane plantation, known as TSM (Thakurgaon Sugar Mill), is part of the BSFIC, becoming a primary source of livelihood for the locals. Poultry farms are a thriving business in Thakurgaon, and the district is equipped with several cold stores. Various businesses focused on the production and repair of agricultural tools have also emerged in the area.

The contribution of Non-Governmental Organizations (NGOs) in the rural economy of Thakurgaon has been significant. Notably, organizations like ESDO and RDRS have received widespread acclaim for their efforts in poverty alleviation, particularly in enhancing the income and employment prospects of both men and women in Thakurgaon. RDRS, particularly in the immediate aftermath of independence, garnered praise for its relief and rehabilitation activities, while ESDO's initiatives in micro-credit, child education, literacy, and integrated community development since the 90s have generated substantial employment opportunities for the economically disadvantaged, especially women. Moreover, the proactive measures taken by NGOs in promoting social and health awareness have played a pivotal role in contributing to the overall economy of the region.

However, the community's distance from the capital poses challenges in obtaining adequate technical and logistical support and in transporting local products to the national market. It is not easy for investors to establish businesses far away from the center of national trade and commerce. Despite these challenges, Thakurgaon is experiencing rapid development. Some business groups, such as the Younis Group and Kazi Farm, have initiated investments in Thakurgaon. With these developments, the agriculture-based district is expected to transform into an industrial hub in the near future.

== Education ==
1. Thakurgaon University
2. Thakurgaon Medical College
3. Thakurgaon Government College
4. Thakurgaon Government Women's College
5. Thakurgaon Engineering College
6. Thakurgaon Polytechnic Institute
7. Eco Institute of Technology

== Places of interest ==
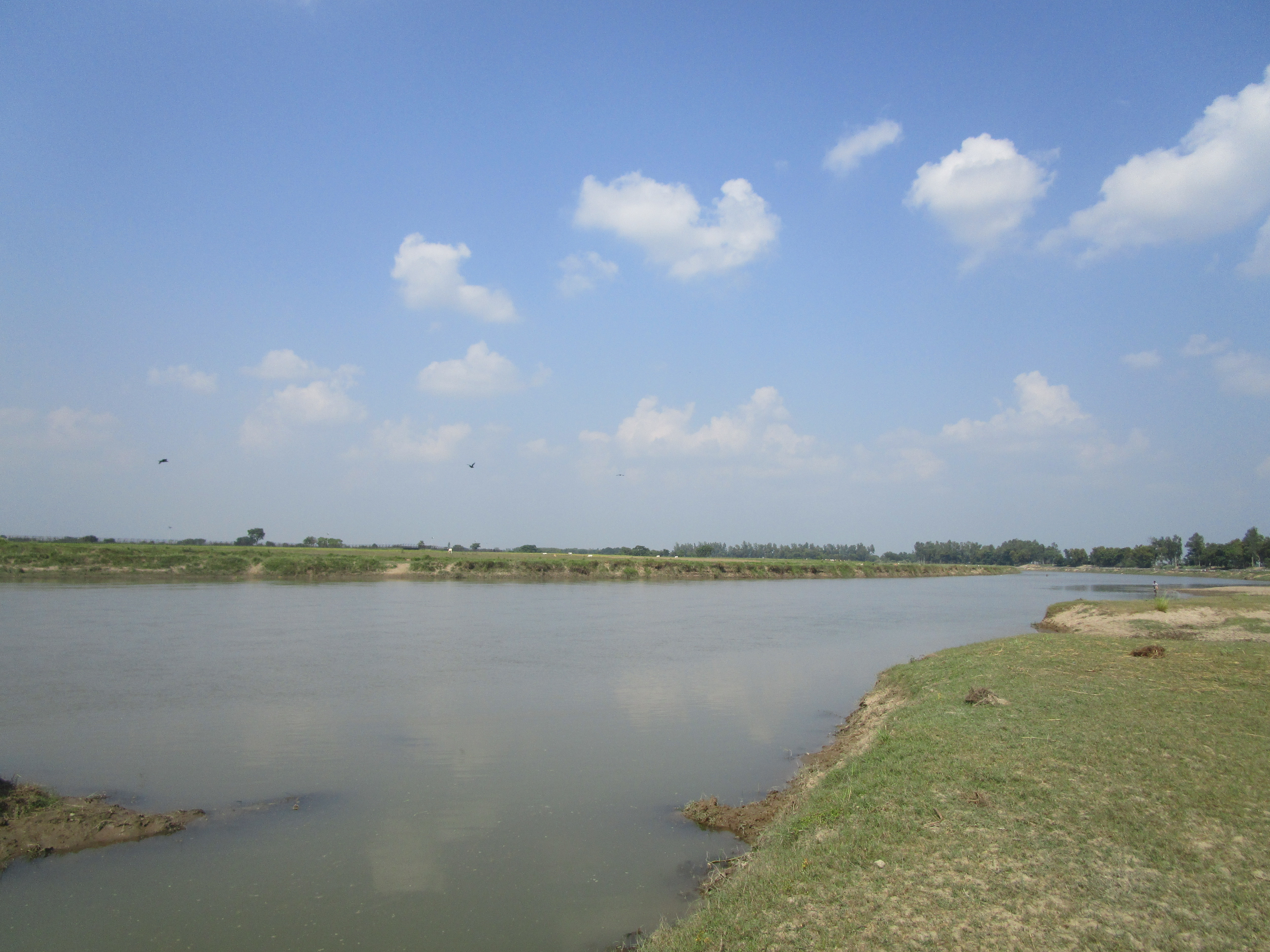
Nagor River at Haripur upazila

There are various places of interest in the district, these include:

1. Thakurgaon Airport
2. Lokayan Life Diversity Museum
3. Haripur King's Palace
4. Ranishankail King's Palace
5. Jagdal King's Palace
6. Palace of King Tonko Nath
7. Ramrai Pond, a historic pond covering approximately 50 acres (200,000 m^{2})
8. Shal Forest on the bank of the Tangon River
9. Jomidar Mosque, Shibganj
10. Balia Mosque, Bhully
11. Nekmord Fair, Ranishankail
12. Horinmari Mango Tree, a centuries-old giant mango tree spread across approximately 1 acre of land in Baliadangi

== Culture ==
Religious and cultural diversity in Thakurgaon is evident through a variety of festivals celebrated by the Muslim and Hindu communities. Muslims observe ceremonies such as Eid-al-Fitr, Eid-al- Azha, Miladunnabi, Muharram (Ashura), and Shab-e- Barat. Meanwhile, Hindus partake in numerous pujas, including Durga Puja, Kali Puja, Lakshmi Puja, Bhiphunda, Saraswati Puja, Chadak Puja, Rasajatra, Doljatra, and Janmastami. Additionally, New Year celebrations, Nabanna, and Paush Sankranti are embraced by all communities.

The Milad ceremony among Muslims marks auspicious beginnings and joyful news. Notably, significant occasions like Eid, Durgapuja, Laxmi Puja, Saraswati Puja witness the harmonious interaction between Hindus and Muslims, as both communities visit each other's courtrooms and extend invitations. Moreover, celebrations such as marriages, Akika, Khatna, birthdays, Annaprashan, and more are occasions where people from diverse religious backgrounds come together. Thakurgaon exemplifies a community where religion does not serve as a barrier.

Beyond religious festivals, certain cultural practices have become ingrained in the local folk culture. Enjoying bread or rice in the evening, playing traditional musical instruments or participating in Tazia processions are not confined to specific religious festivals; instead, they have evolved to become integral parts of the region's cultural tapestry. On the occasion of the New Year, engaging in bird and fish hunting, sharing meals with fellow community members, consuming traditional foods like nuts and betel leaves, and partaking in cultural activities are common practices embraced by people of all backgrounds in Thakurgaon.

In bygone eras, Thakurgaon saw the widespread use of traditional utensils crafted from materials such as pottery, including dishes, lids, tawas, gastars, and items like Dixie, karail, bowls, glasses, spoons, iron pans, and bamboo lacaris or clay lahhi, dies, or duars for pulses. These age-old utensils are still in use today. However, the culinary landscape has evolved over time, witnessing the prevalence of tin, subsequently steel, and, in contemporary times, melamine utensils among the general populace. Glass and chinaware adorn the tables of esteemed households, adding to the overall dining experience. Traditional spice grinding tools, such as stone shilpatas or Haman dithas, were once commonplace and are still retained.

In rural settings, rice was traditionally pounded in potholes or chham-gahins. Women in impoverished families not only ground rice for their own consumption but also received remuneration in the form of additional rice or other essentials. This practice enabled them to create items like chira, mudi, khaoi, serving as a vital means of sustenance for many disadvantaged women. However, this once-thriving profession has gradually diminished, with the advent of electricity leading to the establishment of numerous small and large rice mills in villages.

Today, the market serves as a primary source for obtaining rice, chilis, twigs, rice flour, and spices such as green chili, and turmeric powder. Consequently, women who were previously engaged in rice processing have transitioned into roles as agricultural laborers, reflecting the changing dynamics of livelihoods in Thakurgaon.

There is a versatile practice of culture in the district; few festivals and cultural events are regularly arranged there. Alpona Sansad arranges Boishakhi Mela in every Bangla new year. Held "Eid Fair" at the occasion of Eid-Ul-Adha & Eid-Ul-Fitre every year at Thakurgaon Boro Matth also. Several drama clubs (Sapla Natto Gosty-Estd.1974, Nischintopur Theater-1983 etc. ) practice and perform regularly and stage original and famous dramas every month. Dhamer Gaan is a unique traditional cultural invention of Thakurgaon people. The existing 10 tribes in this area enjoy their own heritage and cultural practices.

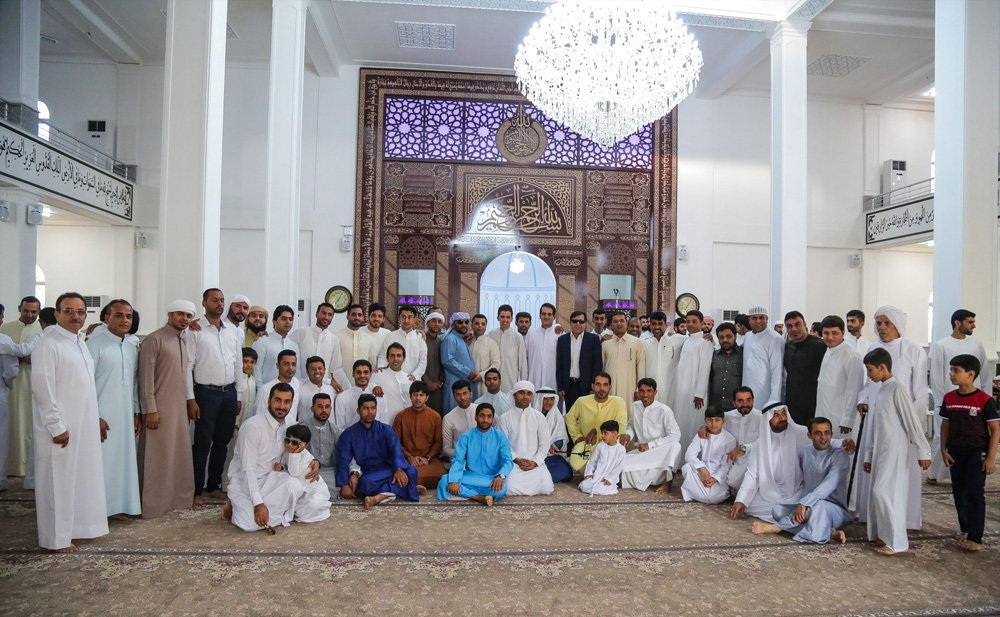
Eid Ul Adha

== Notable people ==
- Mirza Fakhrul Islam Alamgir, current President of Bangladesh and former Secretary general of Bangladesh Nationalist Party
- Ramesh Chandra Sen, former MP
- Shishir Bhattacharjee, painter, cartoonist
- Litu Anam, actor and television personality
- Dabirul Islam, former MP
- Shirin Akter Shila, model and beauty pageant
- Advocate Abedur Rahman, Prominent Senior Lawyer of Thakurgaon district BAR and social worker.

== Gallery ==
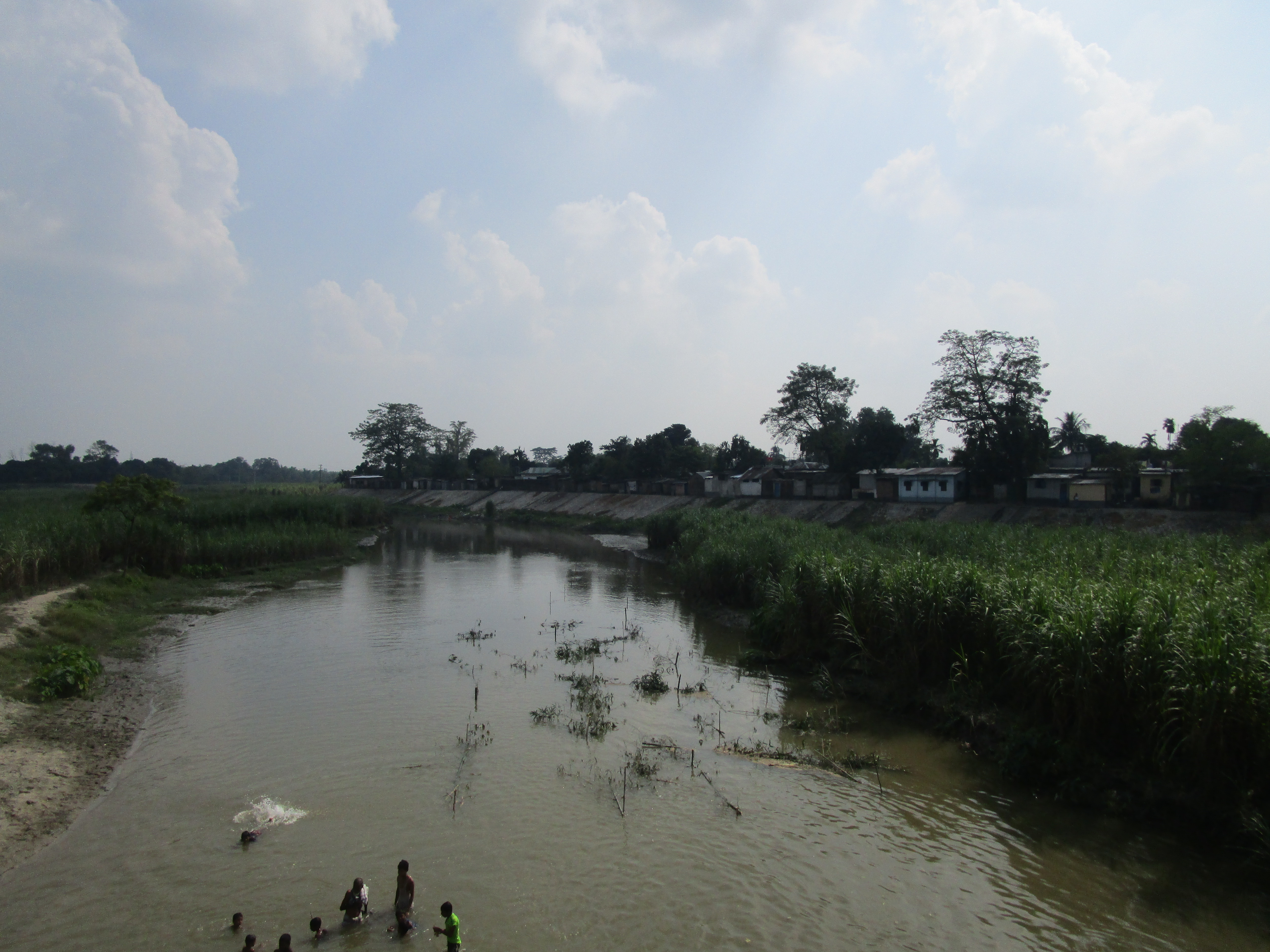
Shuk River at Thakurgaon Sadar Upazila

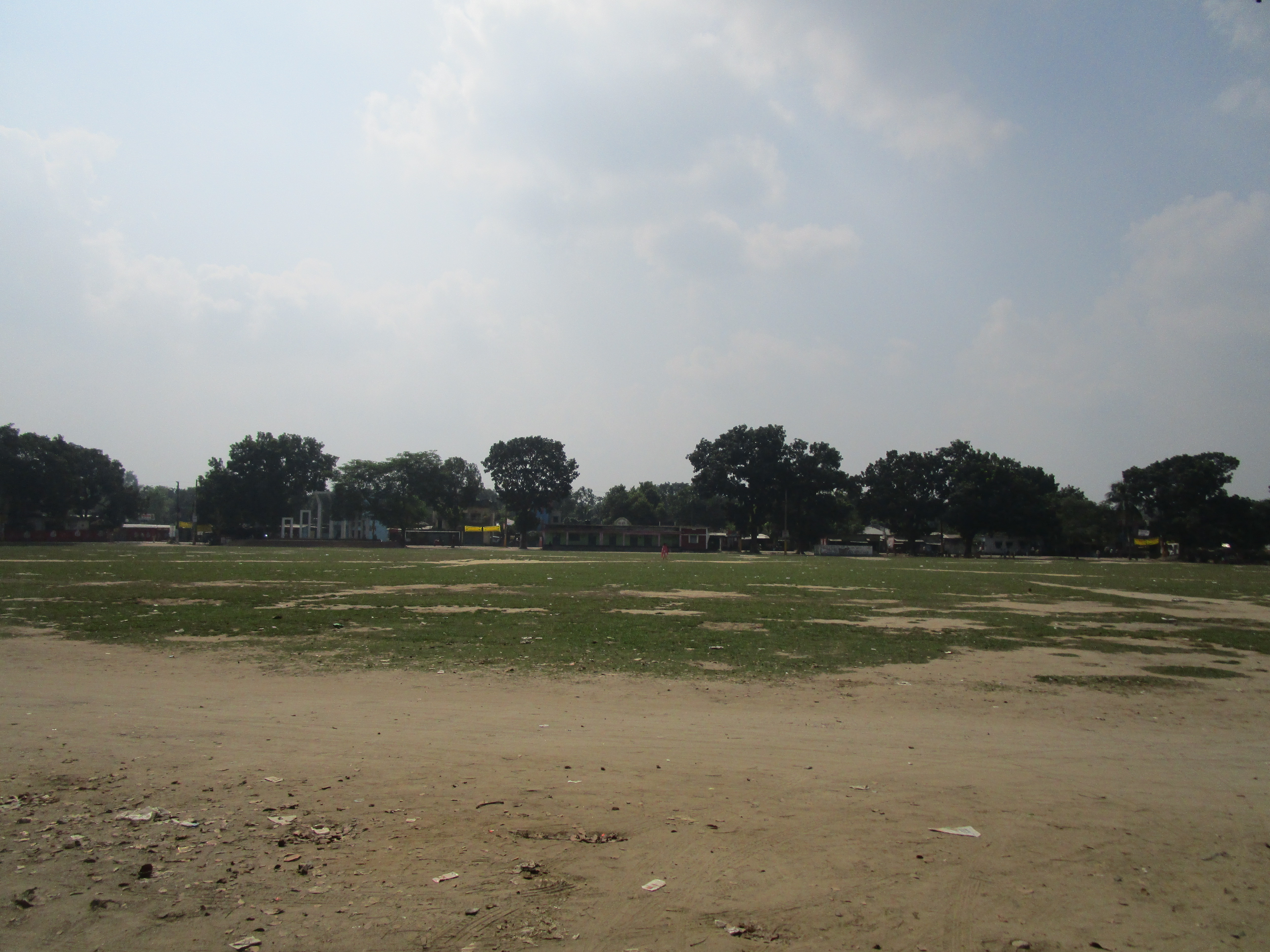
Playground of Thakurgaon

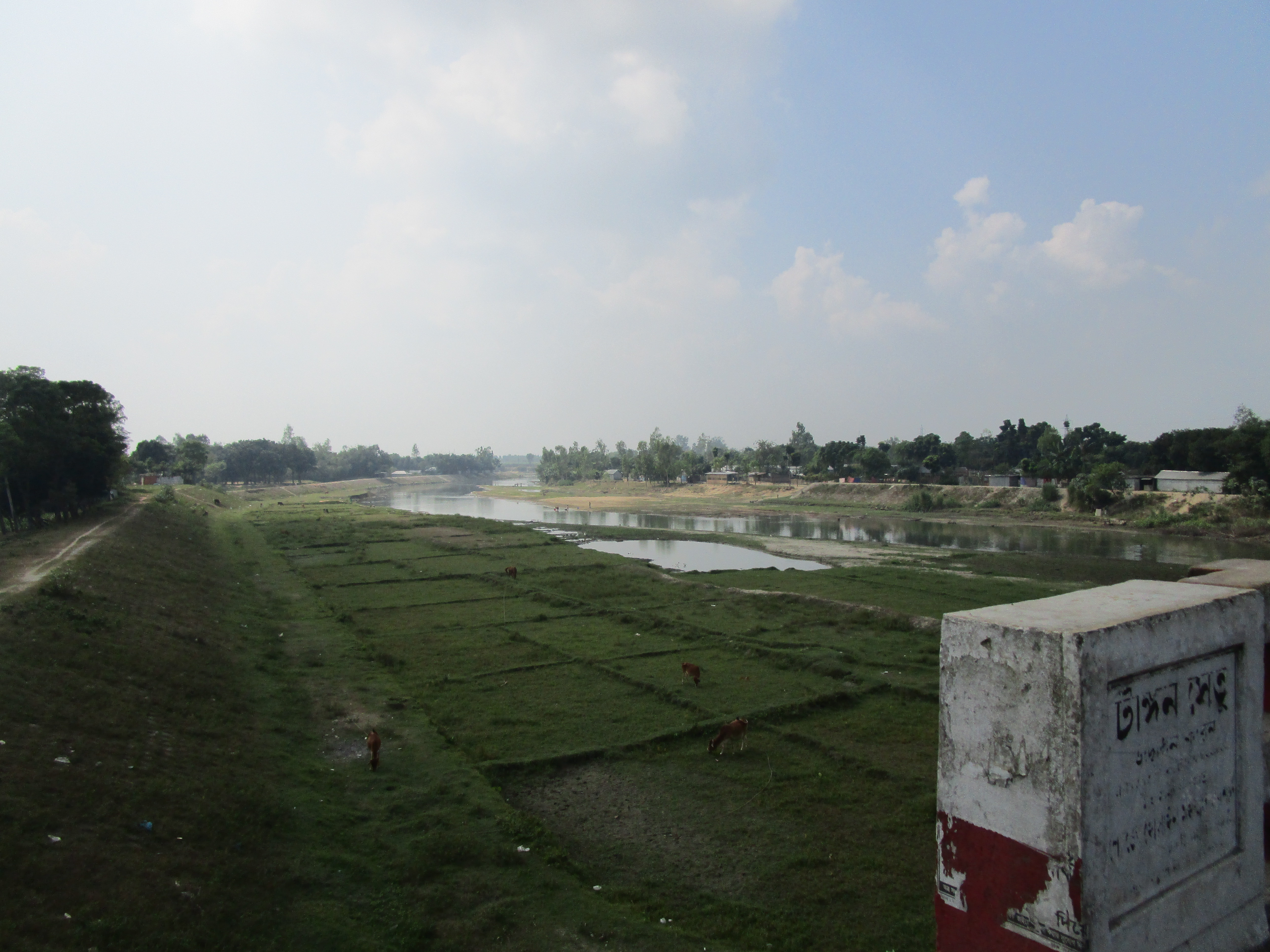
Tangon River from Tangon Bridge

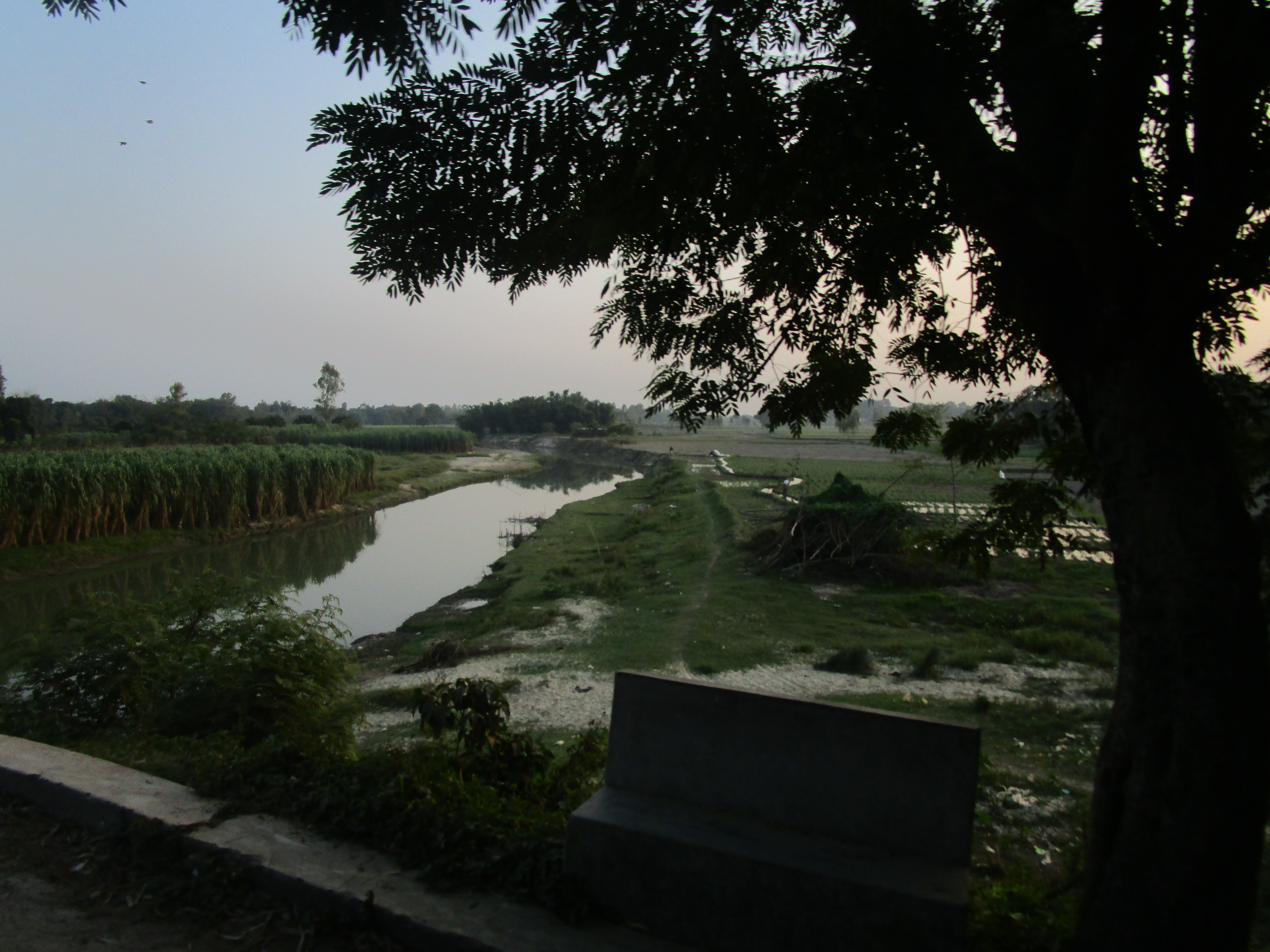
Kulik River at westside of Ranisankail Upazila

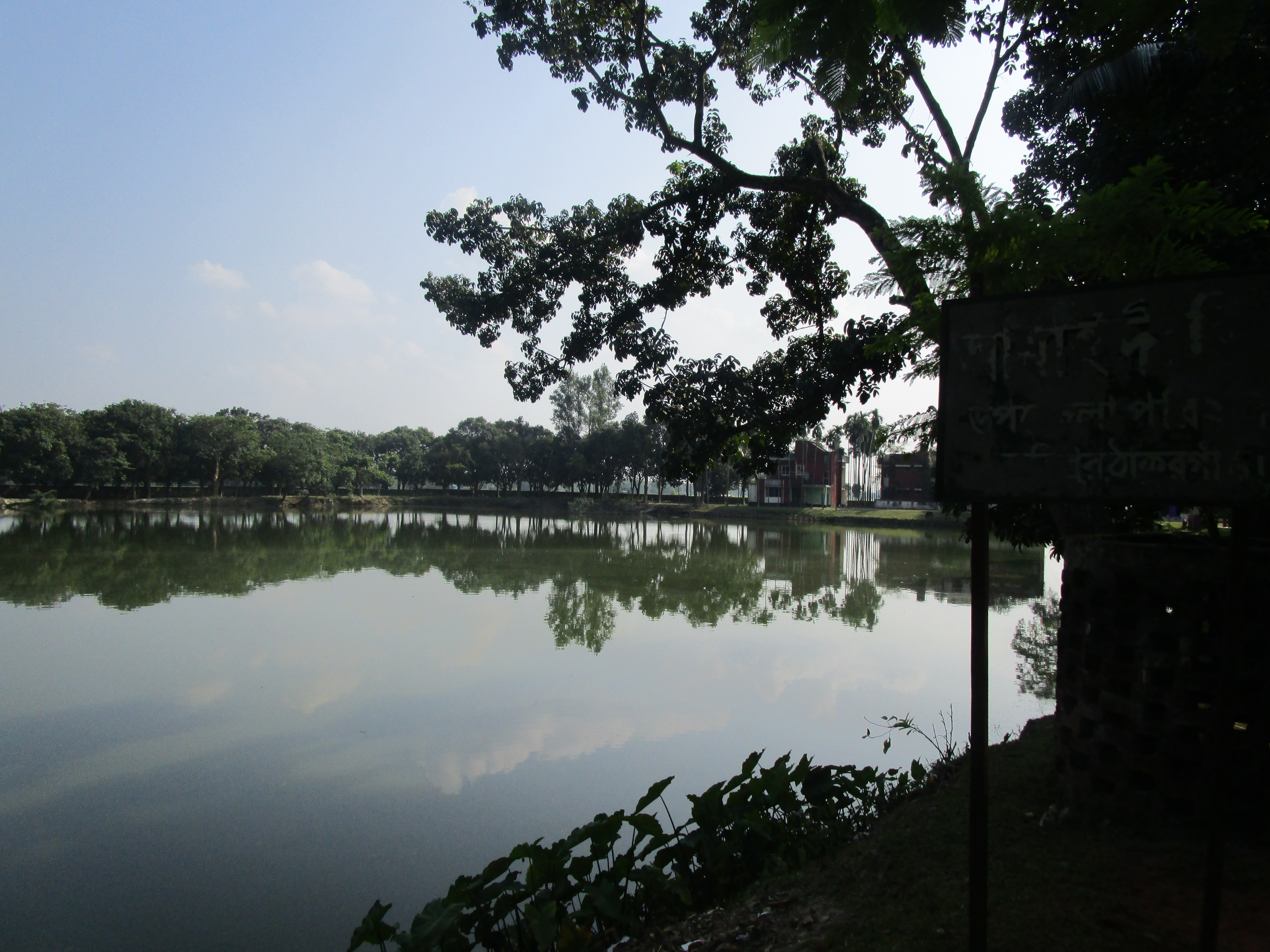
Amai Pond at Haripur Upazila parishad

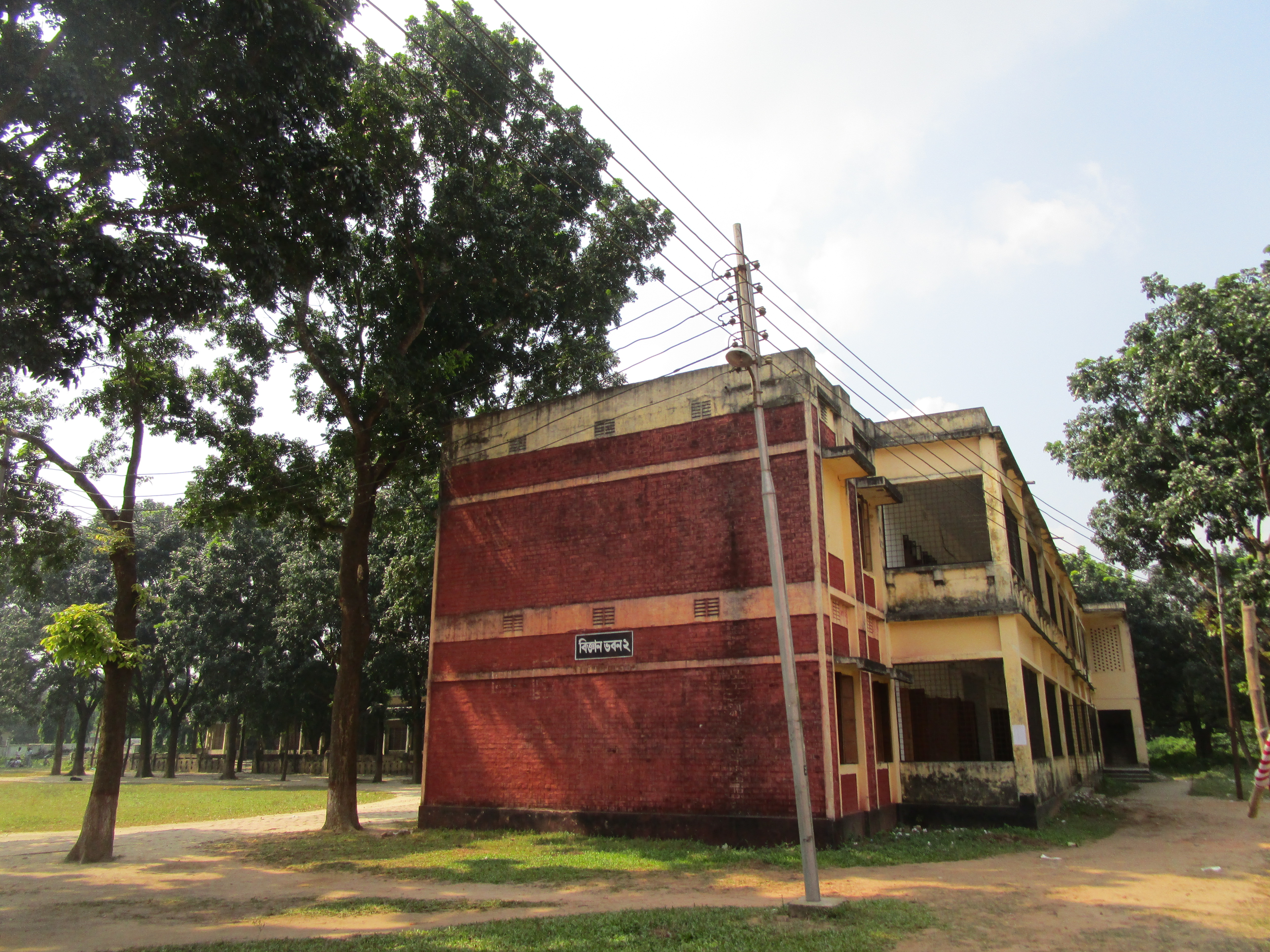
A science building of Thakurgaon Govt. College.

== See also ==
- Haripur
- Upazilas of Bangladesh
- Districts of Bangladesh
- Divisions of Bangladesh
- Upazila
- Thana
- Administrative geography of Bangladesh
