= Thakurgaon Airport =

Airport in Bangladesh, 1940 to 1980

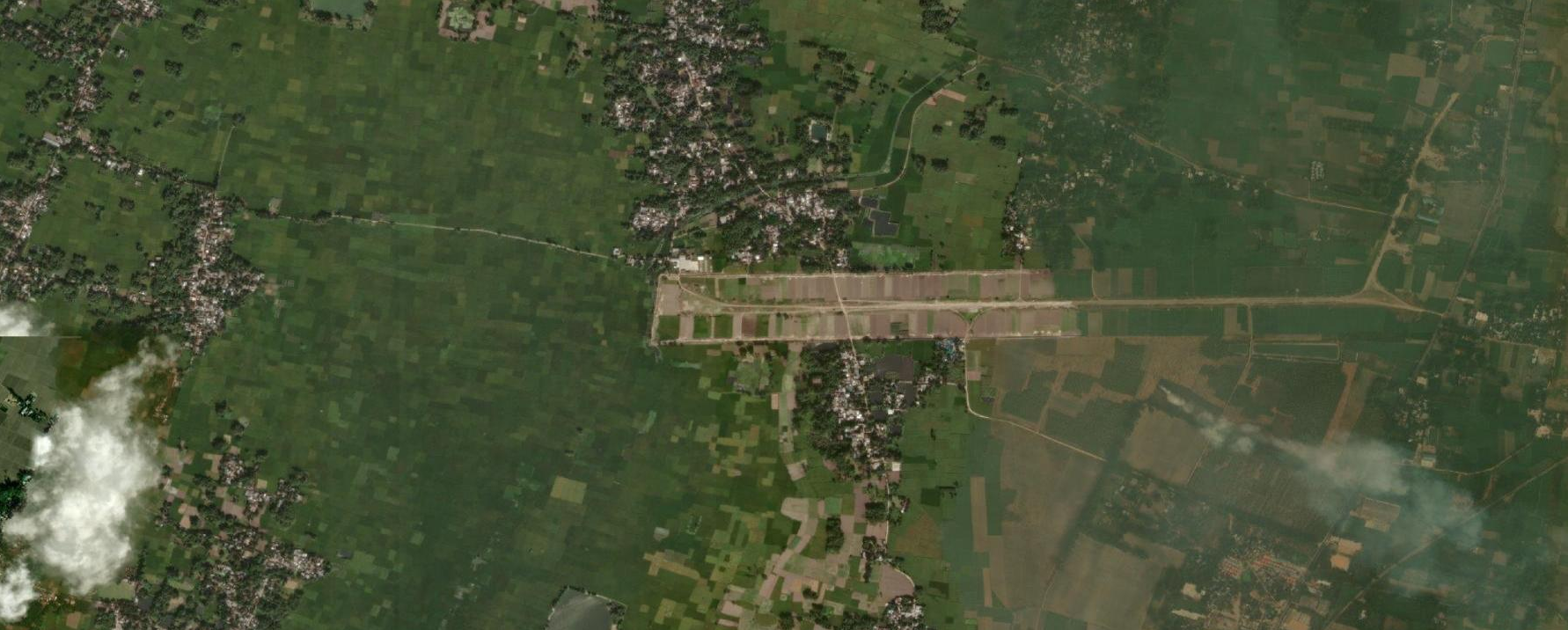
- IATA: TKR; ICAO: VGSG

Summary
- Airport type: Public
- Serves: Thakurgaon
- Location: Bangladesh
- Elevation AMSL: 177 ft (54 m)
- Coordinates: 26°0′59.1″N 88°24′6.0″E

Map
- Location of Thakurgaon Airport in Bangladesh

Runways
Direction	Length		Surface
Direction	ft	m	Surface
09/27	5,720	1,743	Grass
- Source: Landings.com

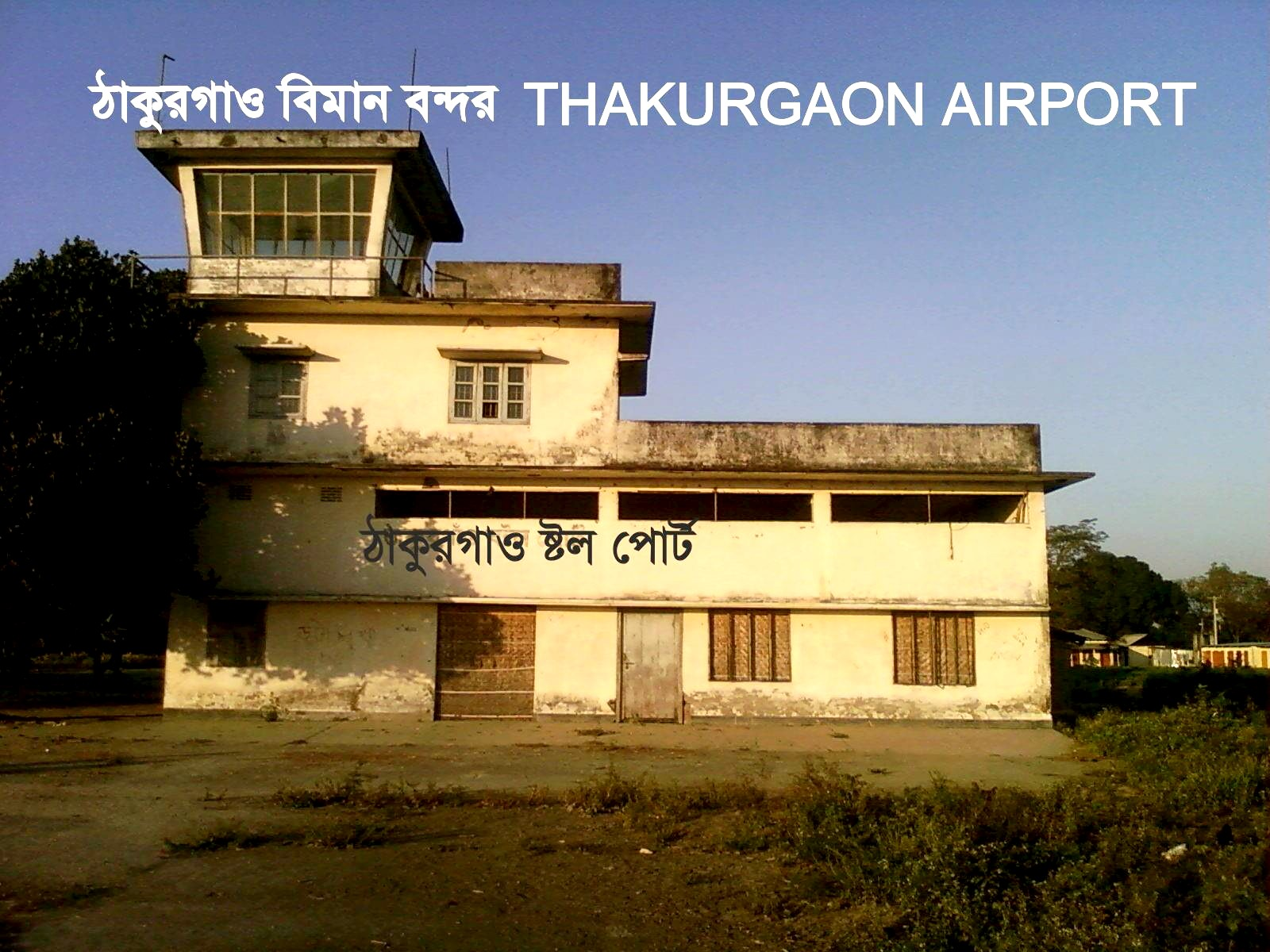
Thakurgaon Airport

Thakurgaon Airport (IATA: TKR, ICAO: VGSG) was a public and military STOL airport located near Shibganj of Thakurgaon district in northwestern Bangladesh. The airport was established in 1940 on 550 acres. This airstrip was heavily damaged by the Indian Air Force during the Indo-Pakistan War of 1965.

The airport was renovated in 1977, and some commercial flights operated there for few years. Due to a lack of interest and a decreasing number of passengers, it went out of operation and was abandoned in 1980. No scheduled flights are available for this airport.

In July 2025, the High Court of Bangladesh issued a rule asking the Secretary of the Ministry of Civil Aviation and Tourism and the Chairman of the Civil Aviation Authority of Bangladesh (CAAB) to explain why they should not be directed to recommence operations at Thakurgaon Airport, further questioning the legality of their inaction. Around the same time, the government announced a broader initiative to revive six defunct airports—including Thakurgaon—as part of efforts to stimulate economic growth and address rising air travel demand.

== See also ==
- List of airports in Bangladesh
