= Thakurgaon University =

Bangladeshi University

- ঠাকুরগাঁও বিশ্ববিদ্যালয়
- Other name: TU
- Motto: শিক্ষাই আলো
- Motto in English: Education is light (Latin: Educere Est Lux)
- Type: Public university
- Established: November 13, 2023
- Affiliations: University Grants Commission of Bangladesh
- Chancellor: President Mirza Fakhrul Islam Alamgir
- Vice-Chancellor: Professor Dr. Mohammad Israfil
- Location: Thakurgaon District, 5100, Bangladesh
- Campus: 86 acres (35 ha); Rural
- Language: English, Bengali

Thakurgaon University is a public university in Thakurgaon District. It is the second general University in Rangpur Division after Begum Rokeya University, Rangpur. It is the 58th Public University in Bangladesh. In two locations, 86 acres of land (58 acres in Rampur and 28 acres in Maheshkhali, totaling 86 acres of land) in Jamalpur Union, under Sadar Upazila of Thakurgaon District, have been finalized for the university.

== History ==
Students and members of civil society first began campaigning for a public university in Thakurgaon in 1996. The movement later regained momentum in 2013.

Beginning of the movement (2012–2013)

Towards the end of 2012, the demand for establishing a public university in Thakurgaon was raised once again. In 2013, Barrister Noor Us Sadiq Chowdhury gave the movement an organizational shape and formed the "Thakurgaon Public Bishwbiddaloy Chai Oikya Parishad" as the main coordinator, which later came to be known as the "Thakurgaon Bishwbiddaloy Bastobayon Oikya Parishad". The movement spread rapidly with the participation of students, teachers, lawyers, doctors, journalists, businessmen, and cultural figures. The entire district became abuzz with slogans like "Jago Bahe Kunthe Sobai, Thakurgaon e Bishwbiddaloy Chai". Through extensive public outreach across every upazila of the district, the signatures of approximately 350,000 people were collected, and a memorandum was subsequently submitted to the government via the Deputy Commissioner.

On 14 August 2013, a huge human chain was held at the intersection of Thakurgaon town, where the then District Council Administrator Sadeq Qureshi, Sadar Upazila Council Chairman Sultanul Ferdous, Paygam Ali (then Organizing Secretary of BNP District Branch), Thakurgaon Citizens Committee President Sheikh Farid, Obaidullah Masud (then Joint General Secretary of BNP District Branch), Monotosh Kumar Dey (teacher, poet, essayist, cultural personality), Syed Merajul Hossain (former district president of CPB, Thakurgaon District), Mansur Ali, Dr. Anwar Khasru Parvez Suman, a teacher of the Microbiology Department of Jahangirnagar University, and the convener of the movement, Nur Us Sadiq, and other prominent figures delivered speeches.

Continuous development of the movement (2014–2021)

In 2014, a memorandum was submitted to the Prime Minister through the Deputy Commissioner and various social and professional organizations expressed support for the movement. In 2015 and 2016, the movement expanded further through opinion exchange meetings, human chains, rallies and press conferences in various educational institutions, and active public opinion formation also began on social media. In 2017, a memorandum was again sent to the Prime Minister and the Ministry of Education, and a series of reports on the rationale for establishing a university were published in national newspapers. The year 2018 is marked as the most important milestone in the history of the movement, because on 29 March 2018, the then Prime Minister Sheikh Hasina made the formal announcement of the establishment of a government university during her visit to Thakurgaon, which was considered the first major recognition of the long-standing public demand. Although field-level programs were limited in 2020 due to the Covid-19 pandemic, the demand continued through online campaigns and statements. In 2021, a major human chain was held again and a demand was made to start the process of establishing a university quickly.

Final Success (2023)

In the context of a mass movement that lasted for more than a decade, a draft of the Thakurgaon University Act was initially approved in the cabinet meeting held on February 28, 2022. Then, on June 12, 2023, the draft of the "Thakurgaon University Act, 2023" was finally approved in the cabinet meeting. The law was passed by voice vote in the National Parliament on October 29 of the same year. Finally, the law was published in the Bangladesh Gazette on November 13, 2023, through which it officially came into effect.

Post-passage situation and commencement of university activities (2023–2026)

Although the law was passed in 2023, no initiative has been taken to start the activities, including the appointment of the Vice-Chancellor of the university, even after a long period of time. In the context of the political change after the mass uprising in July 2024, the issue of establishing the university gained new momentum. As part of the campaign for the 13th National Parliament election, on February 7, 2026, at an election rally organized at the Boro Math of Thakurgaon Government Boys' High School, Bangladesh Nationalist Party (BNP) Chairman Tarique Rahman promised to start the activities of the university. Later, when BNP won the national election, that promise became a reality and the first Vice-Chancellor of Thakurgaon University was appointed on May 7, 2026, ending the long wait and the formal journey of the university began.

== Administration ==
Vice Chancellor

The following individuals serve as Vice Chancellor's of Thakurgaon University:

| Sequence | Name | From | To |
|---|---|---|---|
| 1 | Professor Dr. Israfil Shaheen | 7 May 2026 | Present |

== Campus ==
The university's permanent campus is currently either under construction or in the planning stage. Processes for establishing the administrative structure and implementing academic activities are underway. In two locations, 86 acres of land (58 acres in Rampur and 28 acres in Maheshkhali, totaling 86 acres of land) in Jamalpur Union, under Thakurgaon Sadar Upazila of Thakurgaon District, have been finalized for the university. On September 7, 2026, the Honorable President of Bangladesh Mirza Fakhrul Islam Alamgir laid the foundation stone for Thakurgaon University at Maheshali village.

== Faculties and Departments ==
The University Grants Commission of Bangladesh (UGC) has given preliminary approval for opening six departments at Thakurgaon University.

The lists of the faculty and department are

| Serial No. | Faculty | Department |
|---|---|---|
| 1 | Faculty of Engineering and Technology | Artificial Intelligence and Data Science |
| 2 | Faculty of Agricultural Sciences | Agriculture |
| 3 | Faculty of Arts and Humanities | Multimedia and Creative Technology |
| 4 | Faculty of Business Studies | Accounting |
| 5 | Faculty of Earth and Environmental Sciences | Environmental Science |
| 6 | Faculty of Life Sciences | Public Health |

== See also ==
- Universities in Bangladesh
- List of universities in Bangladesh
