= Ranisankail Upazila =

Ranisankail রাণীশংকৈল
- Upazila
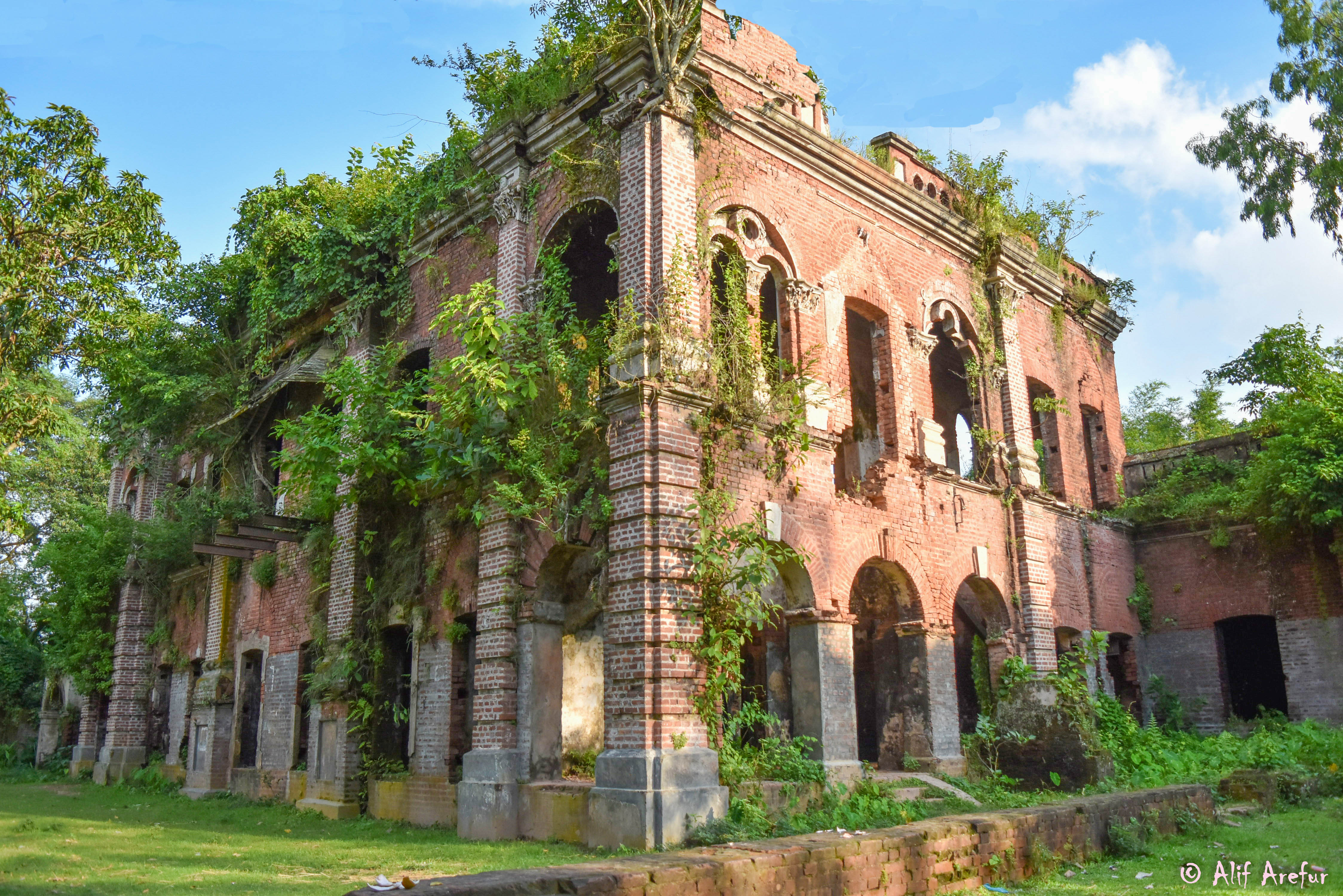
- Tankanathera Rajbari

- Coordinates: 25°53.3′N 88°15.1′E
- Country: Bangladesh
- Division: Rangpur
- District: Thakurgaon

Area
  - Upazila: 287.59 km^{2} (111.04 sq mi)
  - Metro: 10.00 km^{2} (3.86 sq mi)

Population (2022)
  - Upazila: 244,078
  - Density: 848.70/km^{2} (2,198.1/sq mi)
- Time zone: UTC+6 (BST)
- Postal code: 5120
- Website: ranisankail.thakurgaon.gov.bd

Ranisankail Upazila mauza geocode map

Ranisankail (Bengali: রাণীশংকৈল) is an upazila of Thakurgaon district in Rangpur Division, Bangladesh.

== Geography ==
Ranisankail is one of the ancient areas of Bengal. It lies in the north-east corner of Bangladesh and has a total area of 287.59 km^{2}. It lies about 420 km from Dhaka, the capital city of Bangladesh. The main rivers flowing through Ranisankail are the Kulic, Nagar, and Timai rivers. Land use total: cultivable land, 22405.09 hectares; fallow land, 6115.74; single crop, 30%; double crop, 55%; and treble crop, 15%; cultivable land under irrigation, 69%. Prominent historian Francis Buchanan-Hamilton visited Ranisankail in 1814 and described the town as the amalgamation of two villages called Rani and Sankail, and as a small town of around 150 dwellings. Of historical places in Ranisankail, he states that he saw two small forts, one near Sayyid Nekmardan's tomb and another near Sankail, called Ramgarh fort.

Ranisankail Upazila is bounded by Baliadangi and Thakurgaon Sadar upazilas in the north, Thakurgaon Sadar upazila in the east, Hemtabad CD block in Uttar Dinajpur district, West Bengal, India, in the south, and Haripur Upazila in the west.

== Demographics ==
Religions in Ranishankail Upazila (2022)
Religion	Percent
Islam	78.61%
Hinduism	20.58%
Christianity	0.52%
Other or not stated	0.29%

According to the 2022 Bangladeshi census, Ranishankail Upazila had 61,279 households and a population of 244,078. 9.64% of the population were under 5 years of age. Ranishankail had a literacy rate (age 7 and over) of 73.70%: 77.37% for males and 70.05% for females, and a sex ratio of 100.58 males for every 100 females. 40,178 (16.46%) lived in urban areas. Ethnic population is 1550 (0.64%).

According to the 2011 Census of Bangladesh, Ranisankail Upazila had 51,051 households and a population of 222,284. 54,027 (24.31%) were under 10 years of age. Ranisankail had a literacy rate (age 7 and over) of 46.58%, compared to the national average of 51.8%, and a sex ratio of 981 females per 1000 males. 17,762 (7.99%) lived in urban areas. The ethnic population was 2,737 (1.23%), of which 1,241 were Santal.

According to the 2001 Bangladesh census, the upazila had a population of 196,134, including 101,404 males, 94,730 females; 151,890 Muslim, 42,647 Hindus, 805 Buddhists, 14 Christians, and 778 others.

As of the 1991 Bangladesh census, Ranisankail had a population of 156,107 inhabitants. Males constituted 51.67% of the population and females 48.33%. The number of adults was 76,136. Ranisankail had an average literacy rate of 25.7% (7+ years), below the national average of 32.4%.

Ranisankail (Town) consists of five mouzas. The area of the town is 13.94 km^{2}. The town has a population of 25,500; male 52.09%, female 47.91%; population density per km^{2} 970. The literacy rate among the townspeople is 42.9%.

Muslim 76.23%, Hindu 22.79%, Christian 0.30% and others 0.98%; ethnic nationals: Santal 537 families. Main occupations: agriculture 53.7%, agricultural laborer 28.52%, wage laborer 2.59%, commerce 6.41%, service 2.41%, and others 6.37%.

== Economy ==
Land control - Among the peasants, 3.43% are landless, 14.01% marginal, 12.78% small, 64.59% intermediate, and 5.19% rich; cultivable land per head is 0.13 hectare.

== Places of interest ==
Ranisankail is not only known for its natural environment, but also for its historical places. They include the Khunia Dighi Memorial, Palace of King Tonko Nath, Ramrai Dighi (a pond covering 50 acres), Nekmord Oras mela (Fair of Nekmardon), Nekamard Shah Nasiruddin Mazar, Nekmarad Hat. Katihar Hat in Razore village (known for Hindu shib mondir, Rash mela, Extinct Maghi Mela), Kulic River, Gorkoi Nath mondir (900 years old), Dharmagar, Banglagar, Shidassory Pond (sida Digi, Bhandagram), Ranisonkail Pilot High School, Ancient Primary School (100 years old), and Rautnagar hat.

== Administration ==
UNO: Md. Rockybul Hassan.

Ranisankail Thana, now an upazila, was formed in 1837.

The upazila is divided into Ranisankail Municipality and eight union parishads: Bachor, Dharmagarh, Hossaingaon, Kashipur, Lehemba, Nonduar, Nekmarad, and Rator. The union parishads are subdivided into 124 mauzas and 124 villages.

== Transport ==
There are some highway bus services from Dhaka, Chittagong, and Rajshahi to Ranisankail run by companies such as BRTC, Hanif, Nabil Poribahan, Asad Enterprise, Ahad Enterprise, Islam, Rozina, Shymoli, Rahbar, Alam Enterprise, Taj Poribahan, and others. Most of them go from Shamoly, Asadgate, or Gabtoli in Dhaka. A bus trip from Dhaka to Ranisankail takes about 9–10 hours. These buses go through Bangabandhu Jamuna bridge by N5 highway road.

Ranisankail to Chittagong takes 15 to 16 hours via Dhaka, Cumilla.

And Rajshahi to Ranisankail takes about 8–9 hours. Some BRTC buses go to Rajshahi via Gobindaganj.

== Gallery ==
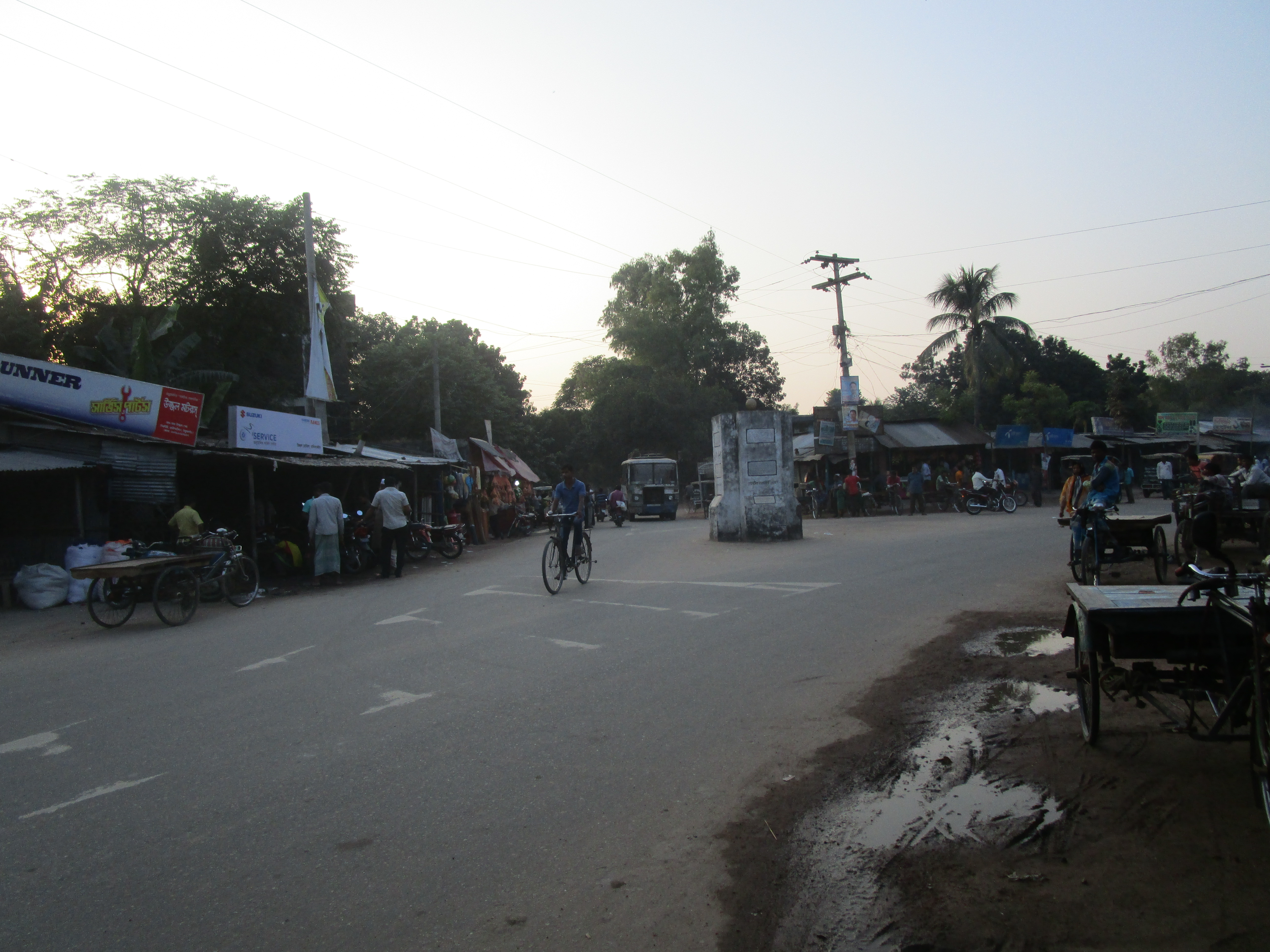
Shibdhighi Three point at Ranisankail

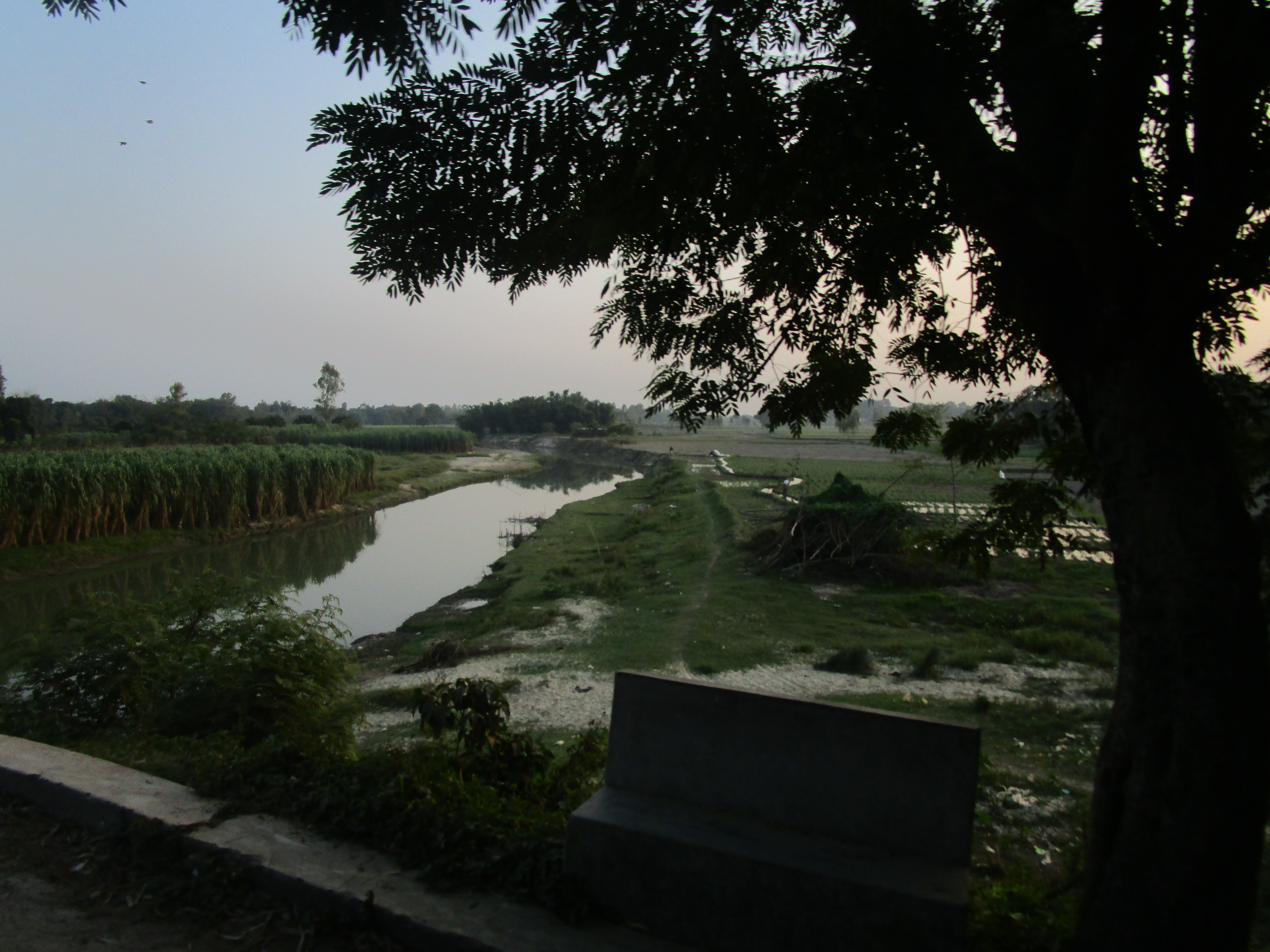
Kulik River at westside of Ranisankail Upazila
