= Haripur Upazila =

Haripur হরিপুর
- Upazila
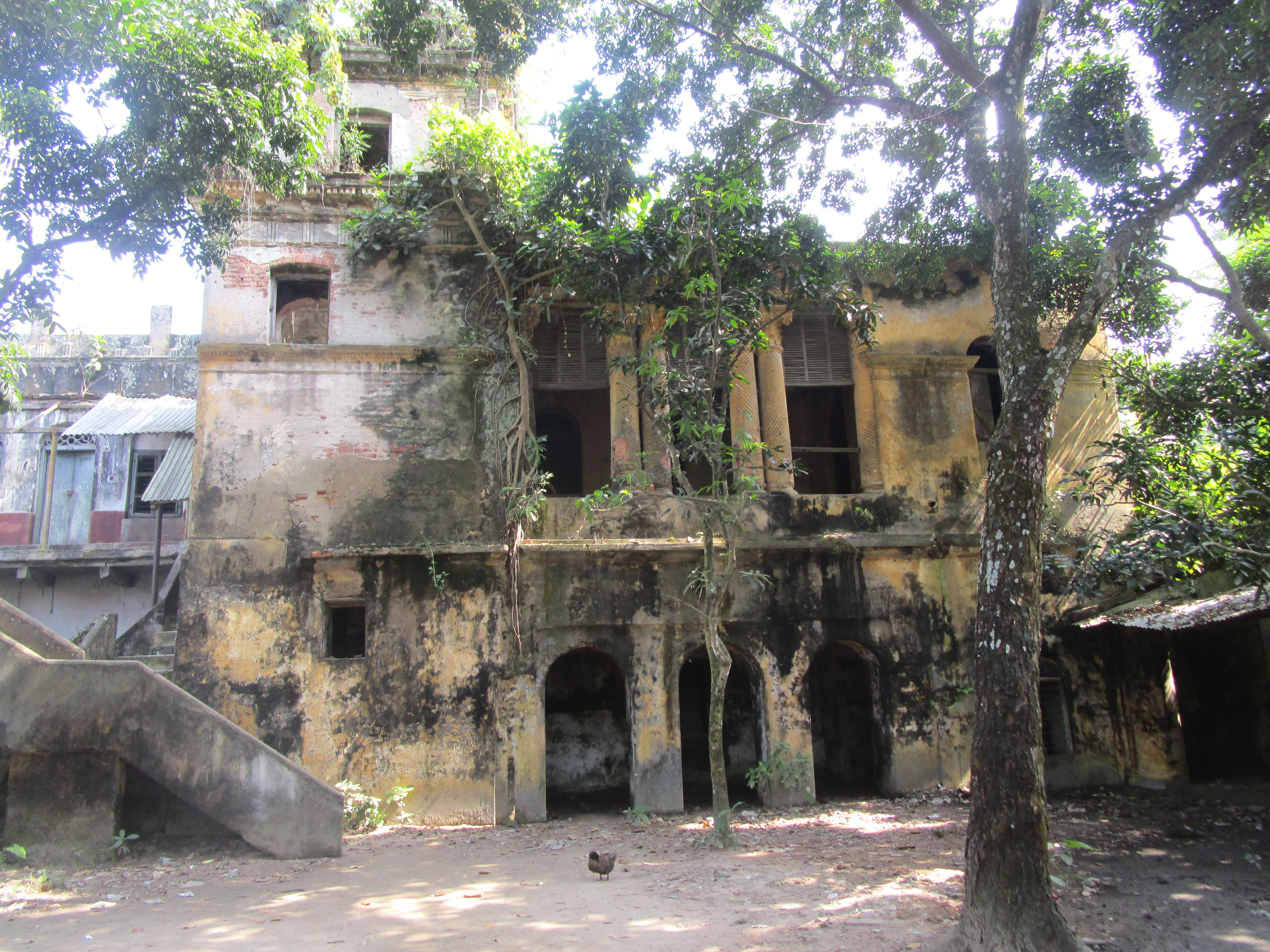
- Haripur Rajbari

- Coordinates: 25°48.5′N 88°8.5′E
- Country: Bangladesh
- Division: Rangpur
- District: Thakurgaon

Area
  - Total: 201.07 km^{2} (77.63 sq mi)

Population (2022)
  - Total: 159,516
  - Density: 793.34/km^{2} (2,054.7/sq mi)
- Time zone: UTC+6 (BST)
- Postal code: 5130
- Website: Official Map of Haripur

Haripur Upazila mauza geocode map

Haripur (Bengali: হরিপুর) is an upazila of Thakurgaon district in Rangpur Division, Bangladesh.

== Geography ==
Haripur is located at 25.8083°N 88.1417°E. It has 32,607 households and total area 201.06 km^{2}.

Haripur upazila is bounded by Ranisankail Upazila in the north and in the east, Hemtabad and Raiganj CD blocks in Uttar Dinajpur district, West Bengal, India, in the south and Karandighi and Goalpokhar I CD blocks in Uttar Dinajpur district in the west.

== Demographics ==
Religions in Haripur Upazila (2022)
Religion	Percent
Islam	90.86%
Hinduism	8.83%
Other or not stated	0.31%

According to the 2022 Bangladeshi census, Haripur Upazila had 39,144 households and a population of 159,516. 10.26% of the population were under 5 years of age. Haripur had a literacy rate (age 7 and over) of 68.98%: 71.74% for males and 66.17% for females, and a sex ratio of 101.54 males for every 100 females. 22,393 (14.04%) lived in urban areas.

According to the 2011 Census of Bangladesh, Haripur Upazila had 32,607 households and a population of 147,947. 38,208 (25.83%) were under 10 years of age. Haripur had a literacy rate (age 7 and over) of 42.14%, compared to the national average of 51.8%, and a sex ratio of 994 females per 1000 males. 7,288 (4.93%) lived in urban areas.

As of the 1991 Bangladesh census, Haripur has a population of 101,658. Males constitutes 50.93% of the population, and females 49.07%. This upazila's eighteen up population is 49,922. Haripur has an average literacy rate of 19.5% (7+ years), and the national average of 32.4% literate.

== Administration ==
UNO: Md. Arifuzzaman.

Haripur Thana was formed in 1914 and it was turned into an upazila in 1983.

Haripur Upazila is divided into six union parishads: Amgaon, Bakua, Bhaturia, Dangipara, Gedura, and Haripur. The union parishads are subdivided into 75 mauzas and 70 villages.

== Gallery ==
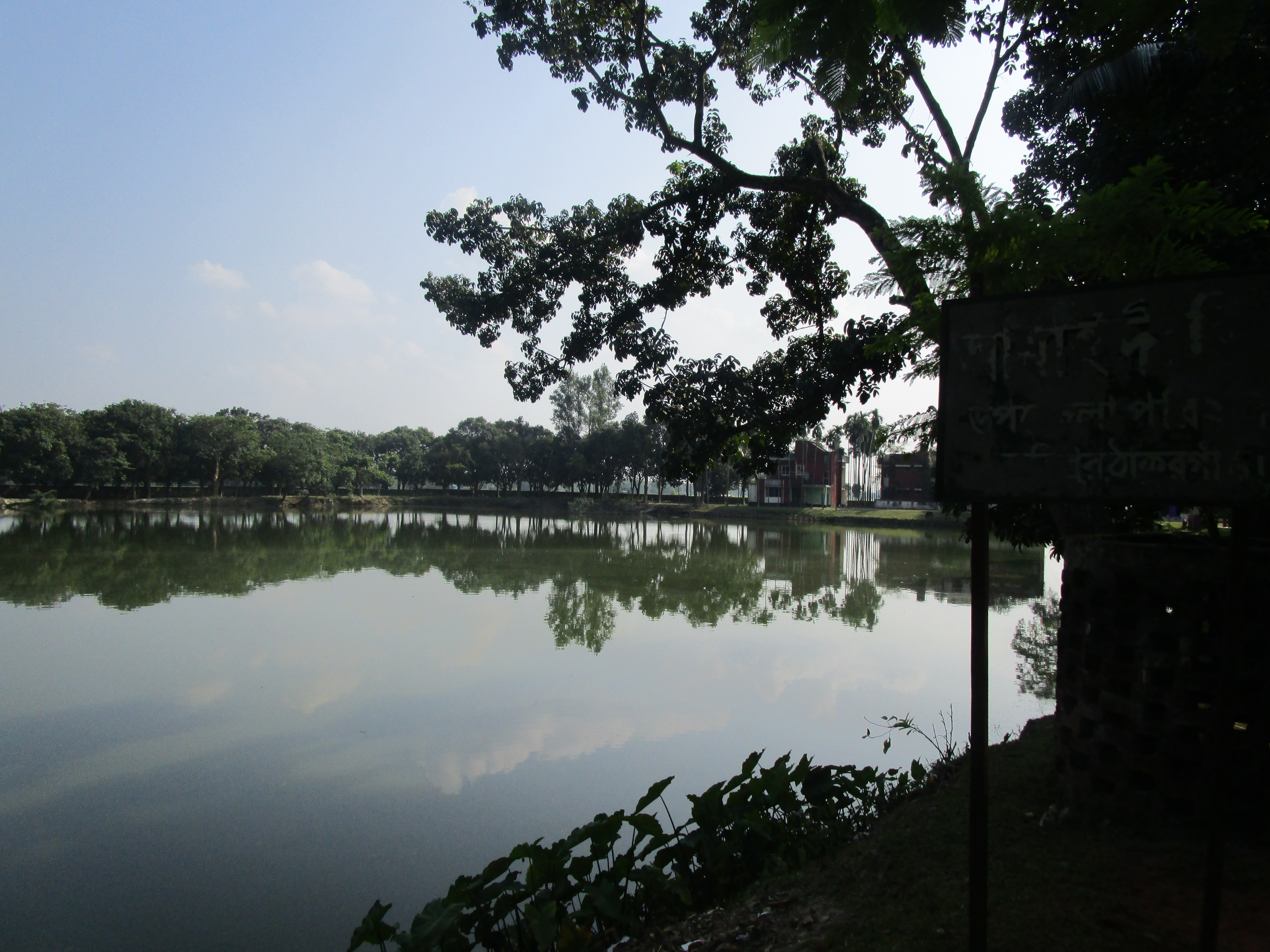
Amai Pond at Haripur Upazila Parishad

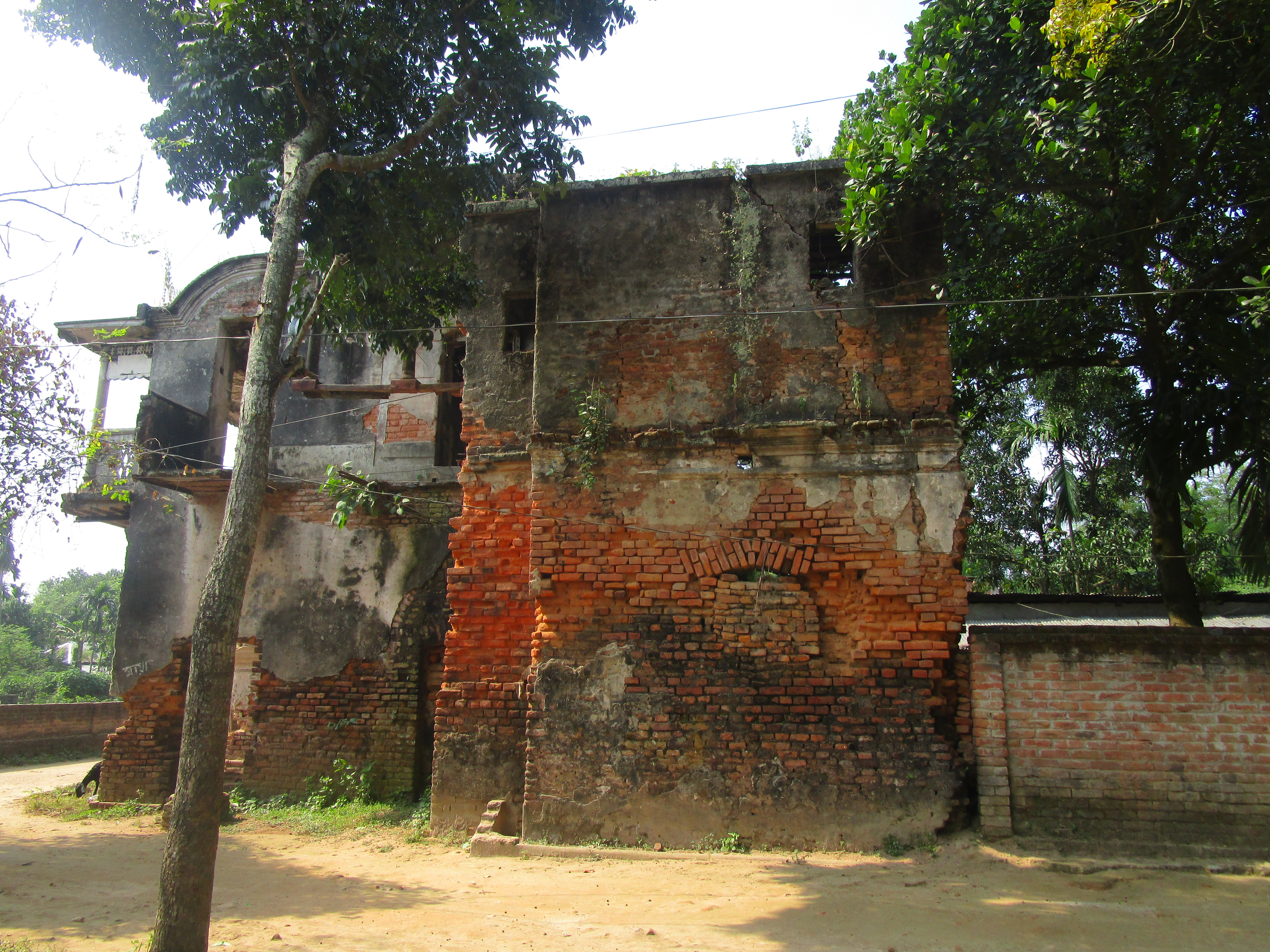
Haripur King's Palace

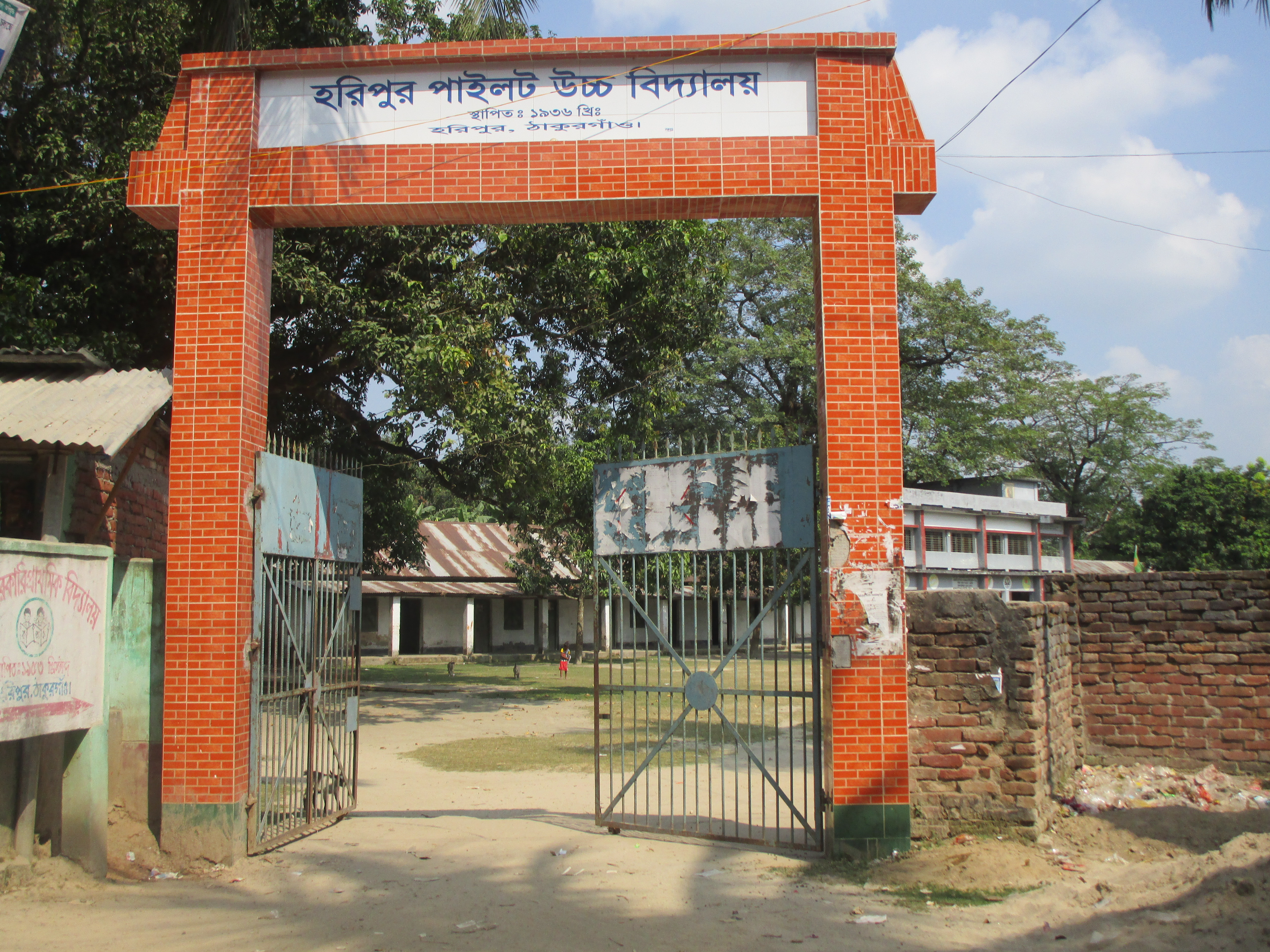
Haripur Pilot High School

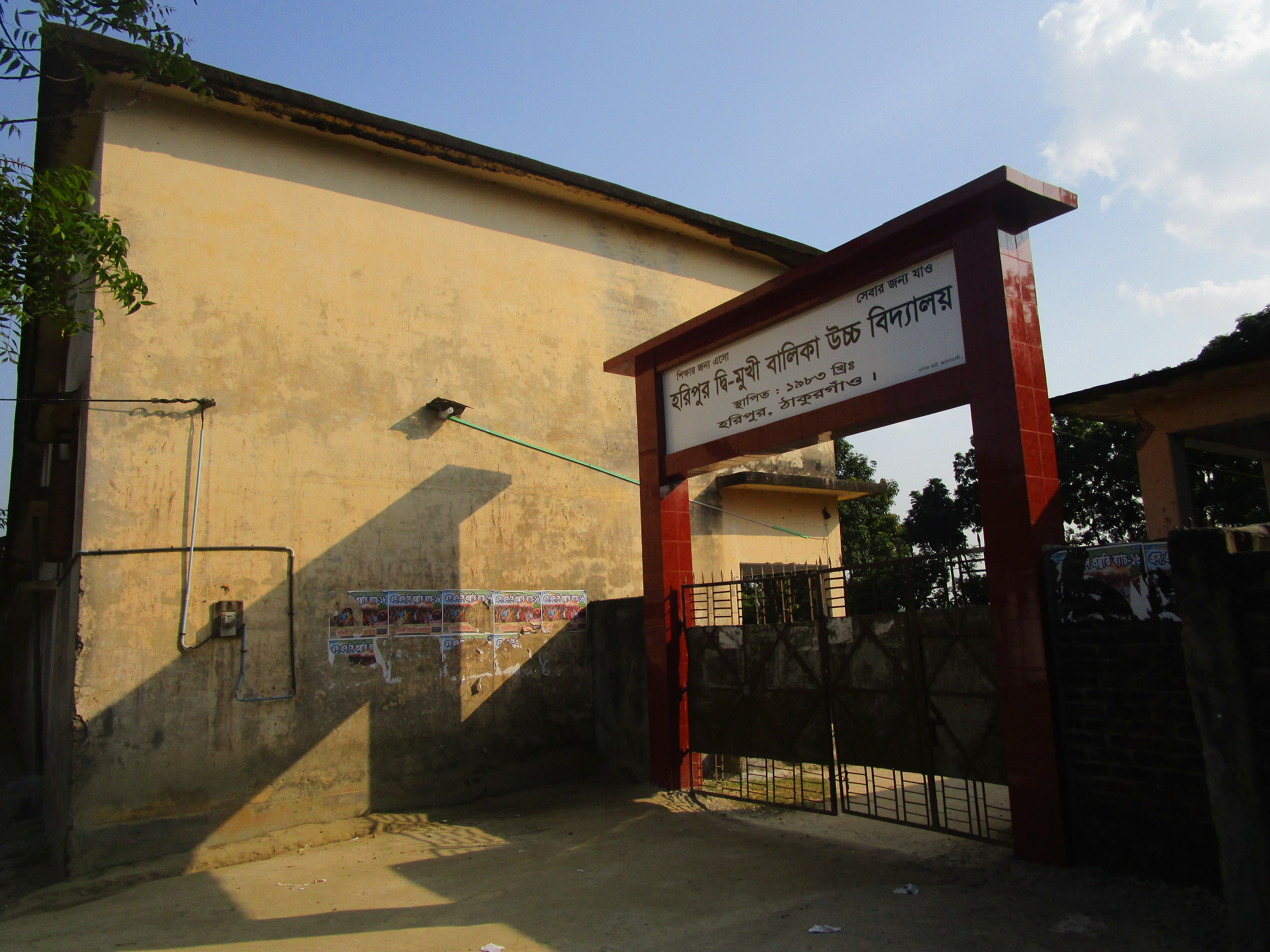
Haripur Girls High School

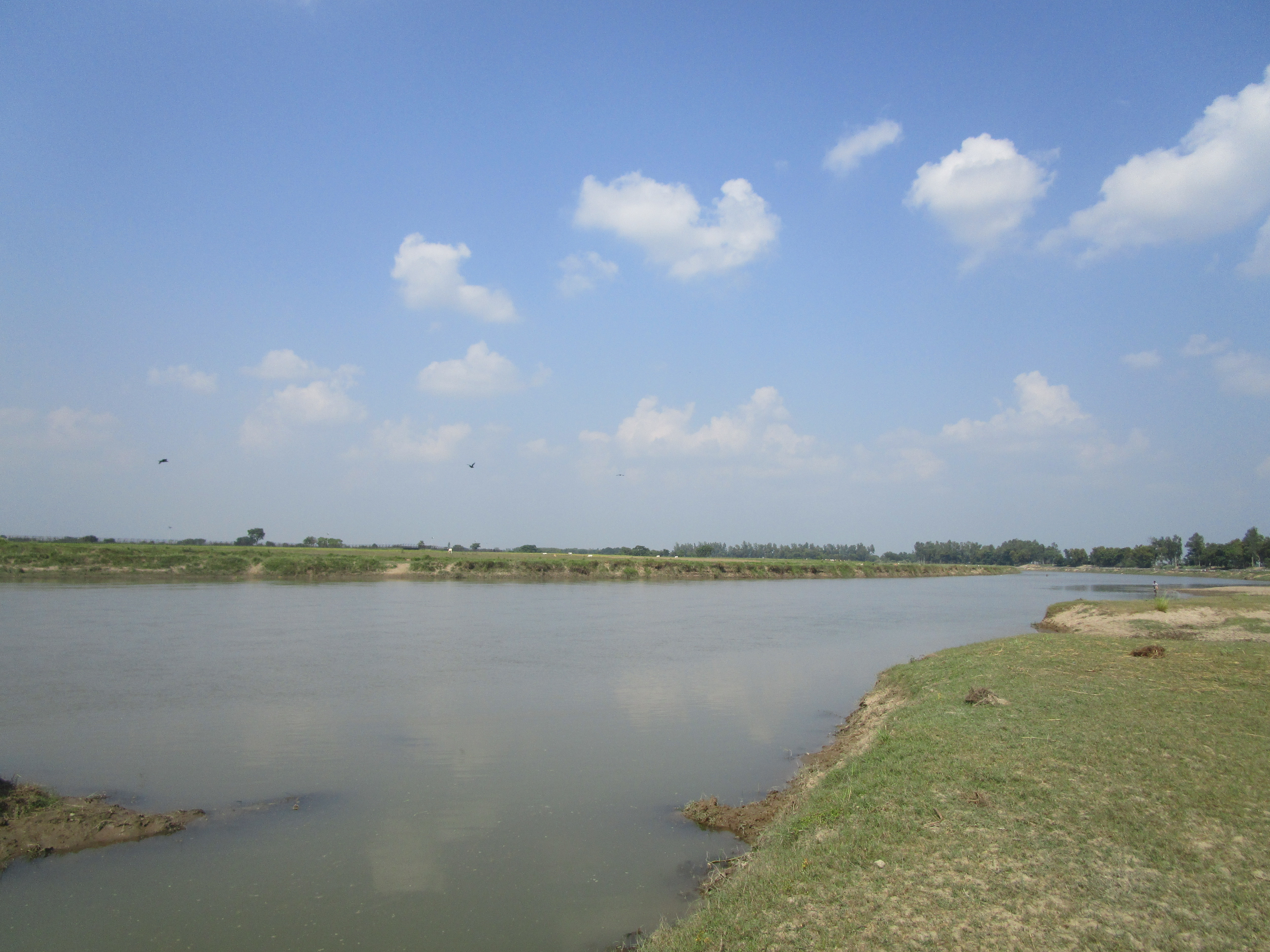
Nagor River at Indo-Bangladesh Border

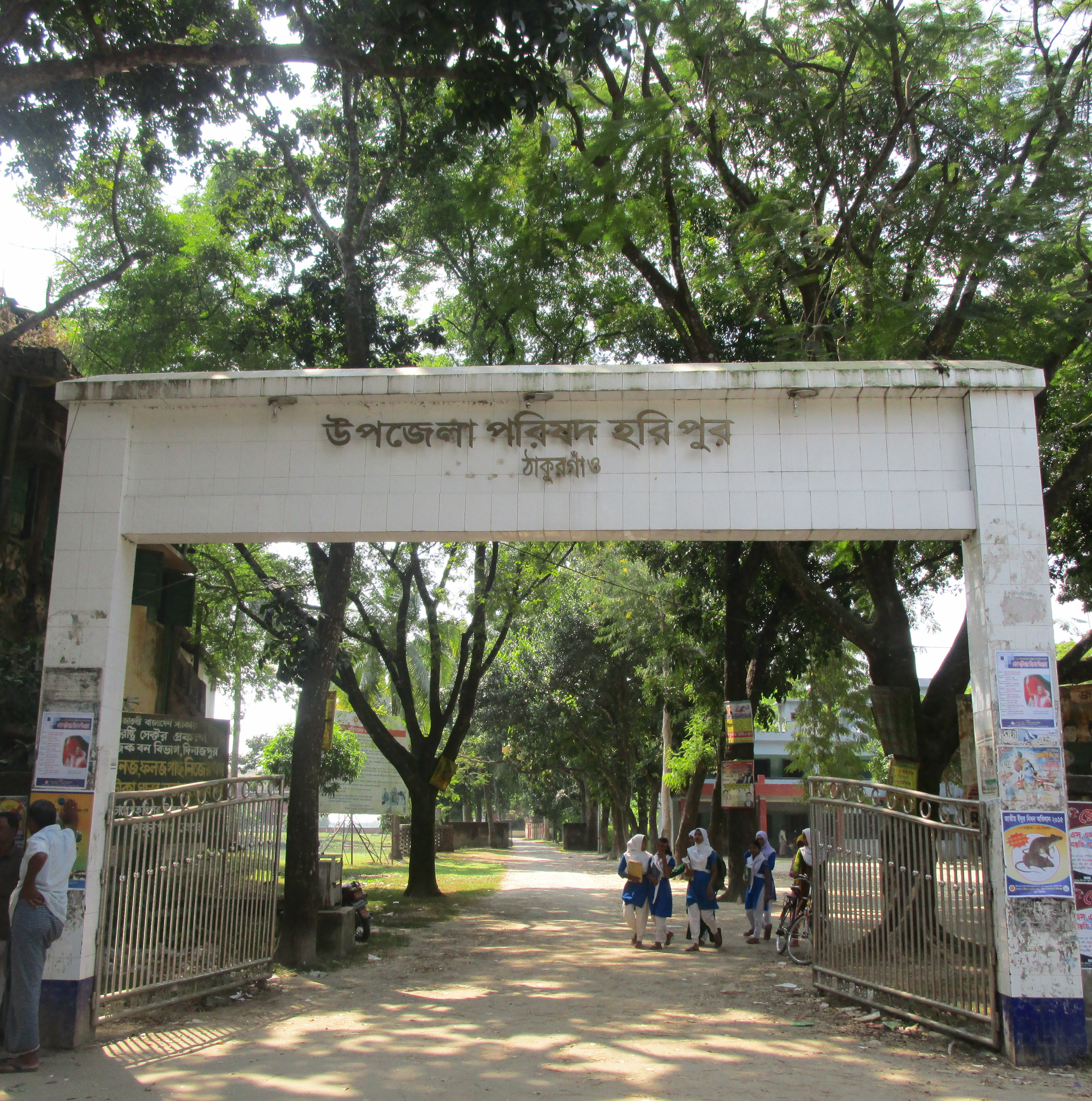
Haripur Upazila Parishad Entrance

== See also ==
- Upazilas of Bangladesh
- Districts of Bangladesh
- Divisions of Bangladesh
