= Bhully Upazila =

Bhully ভূল্লী
- Upazila
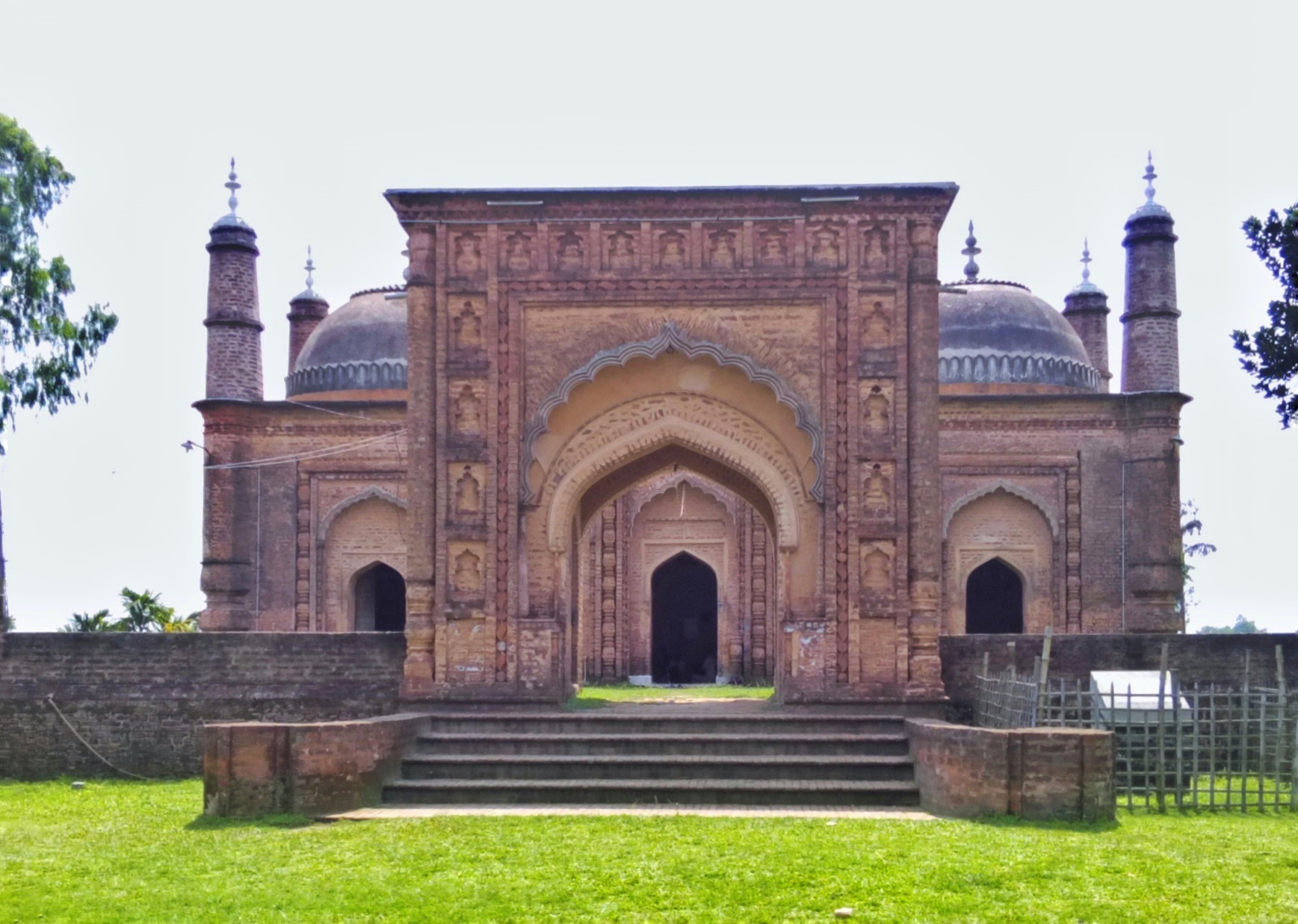
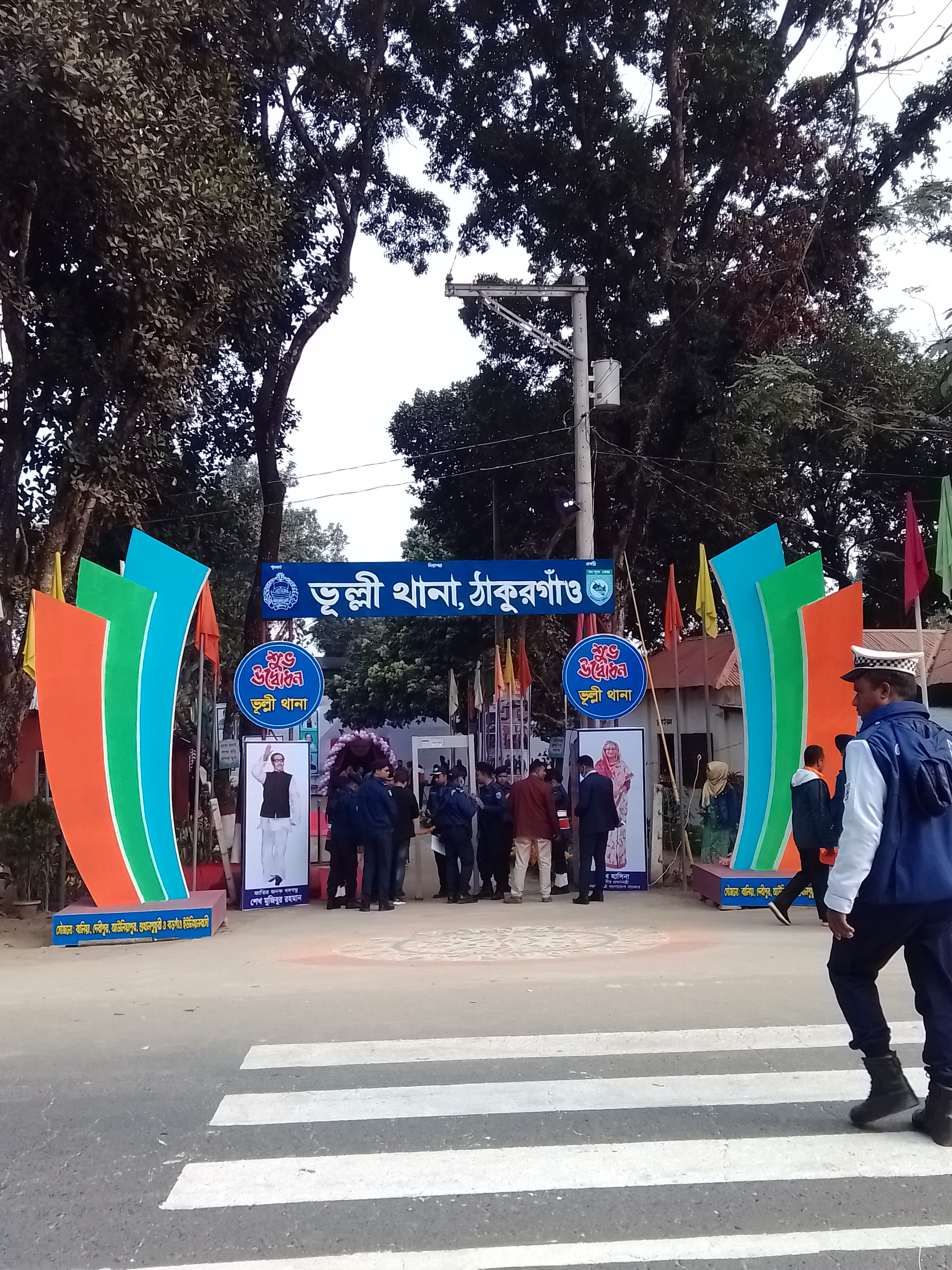
- Balia Mosque, Bhully Bhully Police Station
- Interactive map of Bhully
- Country: Bangladesh
- Division: Rangpur
- District: Thakurgaon
- Thana: 29 December 2022
- Upazila: 7 May 2026
- Headquarters: Bhully Bazar

Government
  - MP (Thakurgaon-1): Mirza Fakhrul Islam Alamgir

Area
  - Total: 163.92 km^{2} (63.29 sq mi)

Population (2022)
  - Total: 129,012
  - Density: 787.04/km^{2} (2,038.4/sq mi)
- Time zone: UTC+6 (BST)
- Website: bhulli.thakurgaon.gov.bd

Bhully (Bengali: ভূল্লী) is an upazila of Thakurgaon District in the Rangpur Division of Bangladesh. It is the newest administrative unit in the district, officially approved by the National Implementation Committee for Administrative Reorganisation (NICAR) on 7 May 2026.

== History ==
The administrative evolution of Bhully began on December 29, 2022, when it was initially established as an independent police station (Thana) to strengthen law and order in the northern part of Thakurgaon Sadar Upazila. Following the local demand for better administrative accessibility, a proposal was moved to upgrade the thana into a full-fledged upazila. On May 7, 2026, the National Implementation Committee for Administrative Reorganisation (NICAR), in a meeting chaired by the Prime Minister, officially sanctioned the formation of Bhully Upazila. The upazila was created to streamline government services and decentralize administration for the residents of its five constituent unions. This reorganization upgraded Bhully from its previous status under Thakurgaon Sadar to an independent administrative unit within the Thakurgaon District.

== Administration ==
Bhully Upazila consists of five union parishads formerly under Thakurgaon Sadar Upazila. The unions are Bargaon Union, Balia Union, Auliapur Union, Debipur Union, and Shukhanpukuri Union. The upazila falls under the Thakurgaon-1 parliamentary constituency.
