= Union councils of Panchagarh District =

Union councils of Panchagarh District (Bengali: পঞ্চগড় জেলার ইউনিয়ন পরিষদসমূহ) are the smallest rural administrative and local government units in Panchagarh District of Bangladesh. The district consists of 3 municipalities, 5 upazilas, 5 thana, 41 ward, 121 mahalla, 43 union porishods, mouza 463 and 825 villages.

== Atwari Upazila ==
Atwari Upazila is divided into six union parishads. The union parishads are subdivided into 62 mauzas and 64 villages.

- Alowakhowa Union
- Balarampur Union
- Dhamor Union
- Mirzapur Union
- Radhanagar Union
- Toria Union

== Boda Upazila ==
Boda Upazila is divided into Boda Municipality and ten union parishads. The union parishads are subdivided into 174 mauzas and 219 villages. Boda Municipality is subdivided into 9 wards and 32 mahallas.

- Benghari Banagram Union
- Boda Union
- Boroshoshi Union
- Chandanbari Union
- Jholaishal Shiri Union
- Kajoldighi Kaligonj Union
- Marea Bamonhat Union
- Moidan Dighi Union
- Pachpir Union
- Sakoa Union

== Debiganj Upazila ==
Debiganj Upazila is divided into Debiganj Municipality and ten union parishads. The union parishads are subdivided into 108 mauzas and 101 villages.

- Chengthi Hazradanga Union
- Chilahati Union
- Dandopal Union
- Debiduba Union
- Debiganj Union
- Pamuli Union
- Shaldanga Union
- Sonahar Mollikadaha Union
- Sundardighi Union
- Tepriganj Union

== Panchagarh Sadar Upazila ==
Panchagarh Sadar Upazila is divided into Panchagarh Municipality and ten union parishads. The union parishads are subdivided into 83 mauzas and 195 villages. Panchagarh Municipality is subdivided into 9 wards and 32 mahallas.

- Amarkhana Union
- Chaklahat Union
- Dhakkamara Union
- Garinabari Union
- Hafizabad Union
- Haribhasa Union
- Kamat Kajal Dighi Union
- Magura Union
- Panchagarh Sadar Union
- Satmara Union

== Tetulia Upazila ==
Tetulia Upazila is divided into seven union parishads. The union parishads are subdivided into 36 mauzas and 246 villages.

- Banglabandha Union
- Bhajanpur Union
- Buraburi Union
- Devnagar Union
- Shalbahan Union
- Tetulia Union
- Tirnaihat Union
