= Sardarpara =

Village in Rajshahi Division, Bangladesh

Coordinates: 26.252°N 88.448°E

Sardarpara is a village in Bangladesh. This village is in Mirzapur Union, Atwari Upazila, Panchagarh District. It is about 5 kilometers north-east of the upazila headquarters. Sardarpara is fully surrounded by green leaf trees, vast lands and ponds. In this village a lot of fish found. People live here peacefully and respectfully. Although most of the Villagers are Muslim, there are several religions of people who live in Sardarpara.

Rosheya, majhgau, Maliparaa, Kanaparra, Vatapara, Gorpara, Hindupara. The famous graves of 12 religious person named The Bara Awliyar Majar is another notable place which is about 2 kilometers away from this village. There are three primary school and one high school. A village market name as 'Sardarpara Haat' is also in the heart of this village. Sardarpara Mosque is the oldest historical and tourist place.

Two big ponds named 'Boro Dighi' and 'Ghaat Baandha Pukur' are just nearer to the school fields.

== See also ==
- List of villages in Bangladesh
