= Mirzapur Shahi Mosque =

Mosque in Panchagarh, Bangladesh

- মির্জাপুর শাহী মসজিদ
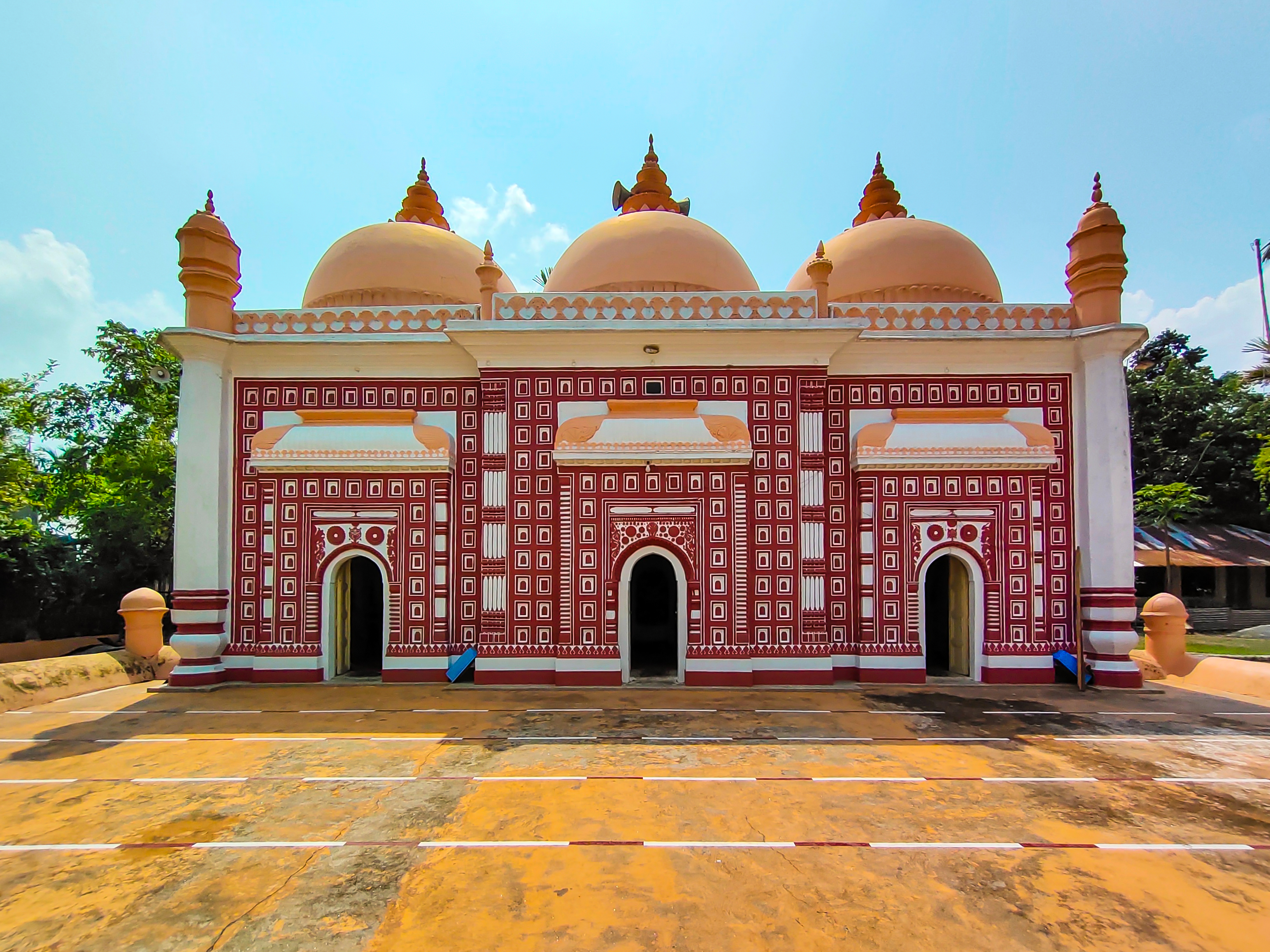

Religion
- Affiliation: Islam
- Ecclesiastical or organizational status: Mosque
- Status: Protected

Location
- Location: Atwari Upazila, Panchagarh District
- Country: Bangladesh
- Administration: Department of Archaeology

Architecture
- Type: Mosque architecture
- Style: Mughal

The Mirzapur Shahi Mosque (Bengali: মির্জাপুর শাহী মসজিদ) is a mosque located in Atwari Upazila of Panchagarh District in Bangladesh.

== History ==
The exact date of the mosque's construction and the identity of its architect remain the subject of historical debates. But it is believed the mosque belongs to the Mughal era, as it bears distinct features of Mughal architecture.

== Location ==
The mosque is situated 17 kilometres southwest from the town of Panchagarh, in a village called Mirzapur.

== Gallery ==
Mirzapur Shahi Mosque
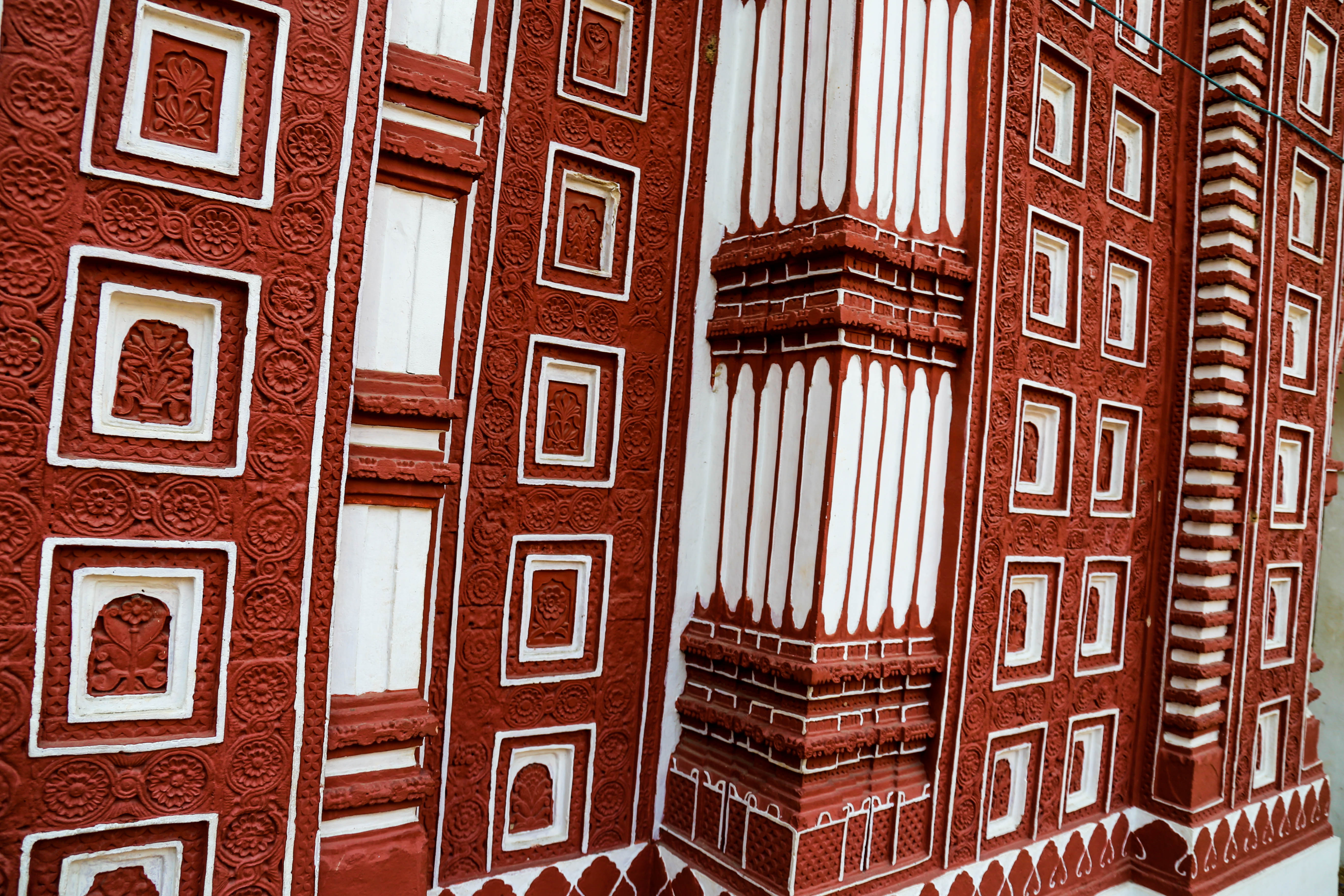
Terracotta design

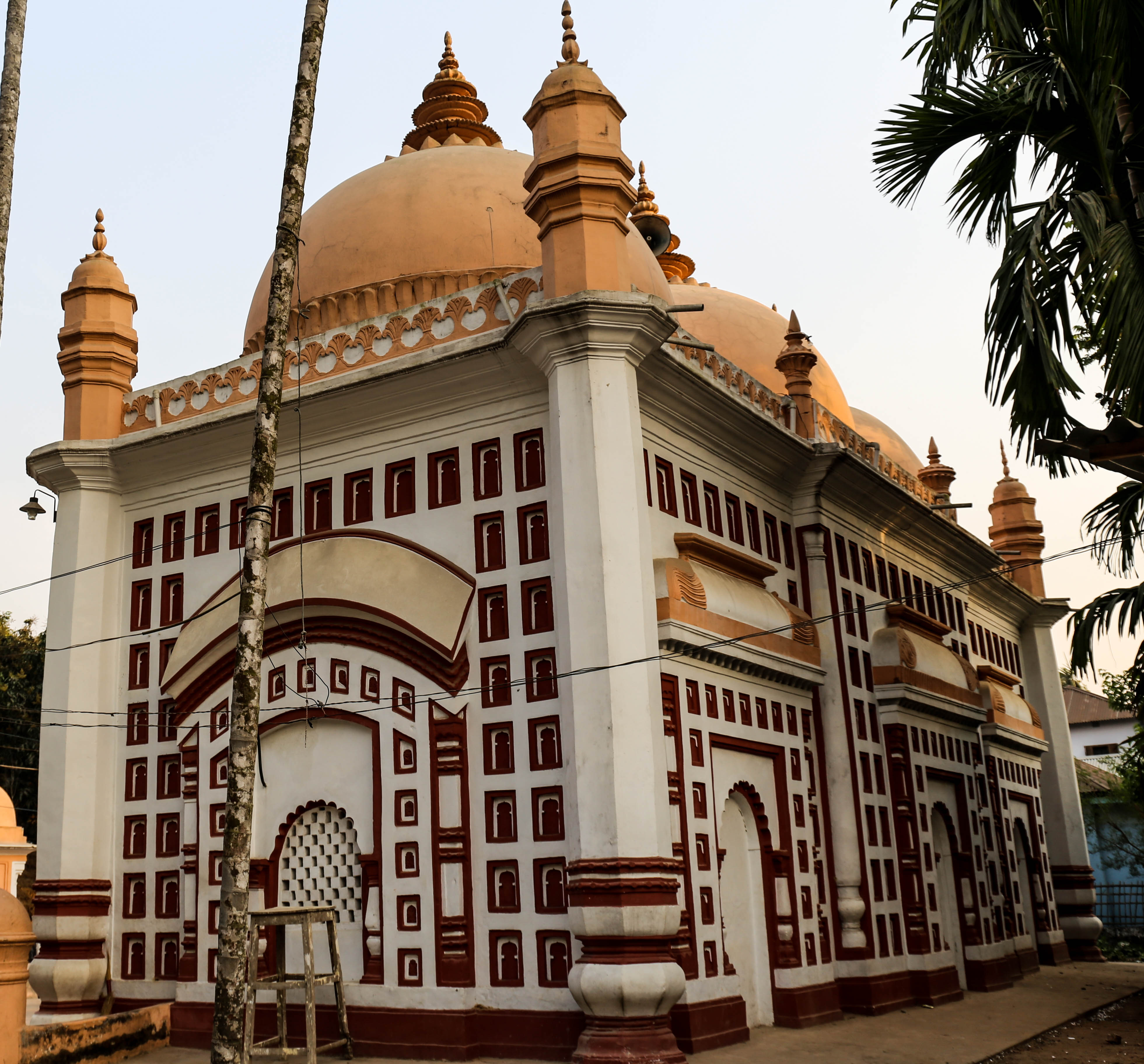
Sideview

== See also ==
- Islam in Bangladesh
- List of mosques in Bangladesh
- List of archaeological sites in Bangladesh
