= Devnagar Union =

Devnagar Union দেবনগর ইউনিয়ন
- Union
- Devnagar Union
- Location within Bangladesh
- Country: Bangladesh
- Division: Rangpur
- District: Panchagarh
- Upazila: Tetulia

Area
  - Total: 18 km^{2} (6.9 sq mi)

Population (2011)
  - Total: 24,790
  - Density: 1,400/km^{2} (3,600/sq mi)
- Time zone: UTC+6 (BST)
- Website: bhojoanpurup.panchagarh.gov.bd

Devnagar Union (Bengali: দেবনগর ইউনিয়ন) is a union parishad situated at Tetulia Upazila, in Panchagarh District, Rangpur Division of Bangladesh. The union has an area of 18 square kilometres (6.9 sq mi) and as of 2001 had a population of 24,790. There are 57 villages and 7 mouzas in the union.
