= Sonahar Mollikadaha Union =

Sonahar Mollikadaha Union সোনাহার মল্লিকাদহ ইউনিয়ন
- Union
- Sonahar Mollikadaha Union
- Country: Bangladesh
- Division: Rangpur
- District: Panchagarh
- Upazila: Debiganj

Area
  - Total: 21 km^{2} (8.1 sq mi)

Population (2011)
  - Total: 23,602
  - Density: 1,100/km^{2} (2,900/sq mi)
- Time zone: UTC+6 (BST)
- Website: sonaharmollikadahaup.panchagarh.gov.bd

Sonahar Mollikadaha Union (Bengali: সোনাহার মল্লিকাদহ ইউনিয়ন) is a union parishad situated at Debiganj Upazila, in Panchagarh District, Rangpur Division of Bangladesh. The union has an area of 21 square kilometres (8.1 sq mi) and as of 2001 had a population of 23,602. There are 10 villages and 7 mouzas in the union.
