= Chaklahat Union =

Chaklahat Union চাকলাহাট ইউনিয়ন
- Union
- Chaklahat Union
- Country: Bangladesh
- Division: Rangpur
- District: Panchagarh
- Upazila: Panchagarh Sadar

Area
  - Total: 51.80 km^{2} (20.00 sq mi)

Population (2011)
  - Total: 23,000
  - Density: 440/km^{2} (1,100/sq mi)
- Time zone: UTC+6 (BST)
- Website: chaklahatup.panchagarh.gov.bd

Chaklahat Union (Bengali: চাকলাহাট ইউনিয়ন) is a union parishad situated at Panchagarh Sadar Upazila, in Panchagarh District, Rangpur Division of Bangladesh. The union has an area of 51.80 square kilometres (20.00 sq mi) and as of 2001 had a population of 23,000. There are 56 villages and 12 mouzas in the union.
