= Shaldanga Union =

Shaldanga Union শালডাঙ্গা ইউনিয়ন
- Union
- Shaldanga Union
- Country: Bangladesh
- Division: Rangpur
- District: Panchagarh
- Upazila: Debiganj

Area
  - Total: 21.5 km^{2} (8.3 sq mi)

Population (2011)
  - Total: 18,034
  - Density: 839/km^{2} (2,170/sq mi)
- Time zone: UTC+6 (BST)
- Website: shaldangaup.panchagarh.gov.bd

Shaldanga Union (Bengali: শালডাঙ্গা ইউনিয়ন) is a union parishad situated at Debiganj Upazila, in Panchagarh District, Rangpur Division of Bangladesh. The union has an area of 21.5 square kilometres (8.3 sq mi) and as of 2001 had a population of 18,034. There are 61 villages and 10 mouzas in the union.
