= Radhanagar Union, Atwari =

Radhanagar Union রাধানগর ইউনিয়ন
- Union
- Radhanagar Union
- Country: Bangladesh
- Division: Rangpur
- District: Panchagarh
- Upazila: Atwari

Area
  - Total: 46.33 km^{2} (17.89 sq mi)

Population (2011)
  - Total: 23,659
  - Density: 510.7/km^{2} (1,323/sq mi)
- Time zone: UTC+6 (BST)
- Website: radhanagarup.panchagarh.gov.bd

Radhanagar Union (Bengali: রাধানগর ইউনিয়ন) is a union parishad situated at Atwari Upazila, in Panchagarh District, Rangpur Division of Bangladesh. The union has an area of 46.33 square kilometres (17.89 sq mi) and as of 2001 had a population of 23,659. There are 9 villages and 9 mouzas in the union.
