= Chengthi Hazradanga Union =

Chengthi Hazradanga Union চেংঠী হাজরাডাঙ্গা ইউনিয়ন
- Union
- Chengthi Hazradanga Union
- Country: Bangladesh
- Division: Rangpur
- District: Panchagarh
- Upazila: Debiganj

Area
  - Total: 21.00 km^{2} (8.11 sq mi)

Population (2011)
  - Total: 20,885
  - Density: 994.5/km^{2} (2,576/sq mi)
- Time zone: UTC+6 (BST)
- Website: chengthihazradangaup.panchagarh.gov.bd

Chengthi Hazradanga Union (Bengali: চেংঠী হাজরাডাঙ্গা ইউনিয়ন) is a union parishad situated at Debiganj Upazila, in Panchagarh District, Rangpur Division of Bangladesh. The union has an area of 21.00 square kilometres (8.11 sq mi) and as of 2001 had a population of 20,885. There are 12 villages and 10 mouzas in the union.
