= Tetulia Union, Tetulia =

Tetulia Union তেঁতুলিয়া ইউনিয়ন
- Union
- Tetulia Union
- Country: Bangladesh
- Division: Rangpur
- District: Panchagarh
- Upazila: Tetulia

Area
  - Total: 25.54 km^{2} (9.86 sq mi)

Population (2011)
  - Total: 23,620
  - Density: 924.8/km^{2} (2,395/sq mi)
- Time zone: UTC+6 (BST)
- Website: tetuliaup.panchagarh.gov.bd

Tetulia Union (Bengali: তেঁতুলিয়া ইউনিয়ন) is a union parishad situated at Tetulia Upazila, in Panchagarh District, Rangpur Division of Bangladesh. The union has an area of 25.54 square kilometres (9.86 sq mi) and as of 2001 had a population of 23,620. There are 37 villages and 8 mouzas in the union.
