= Banglabandha Union =

Banglabandha Union বাংলাবান্ধা ইউনিয়ন
- Union
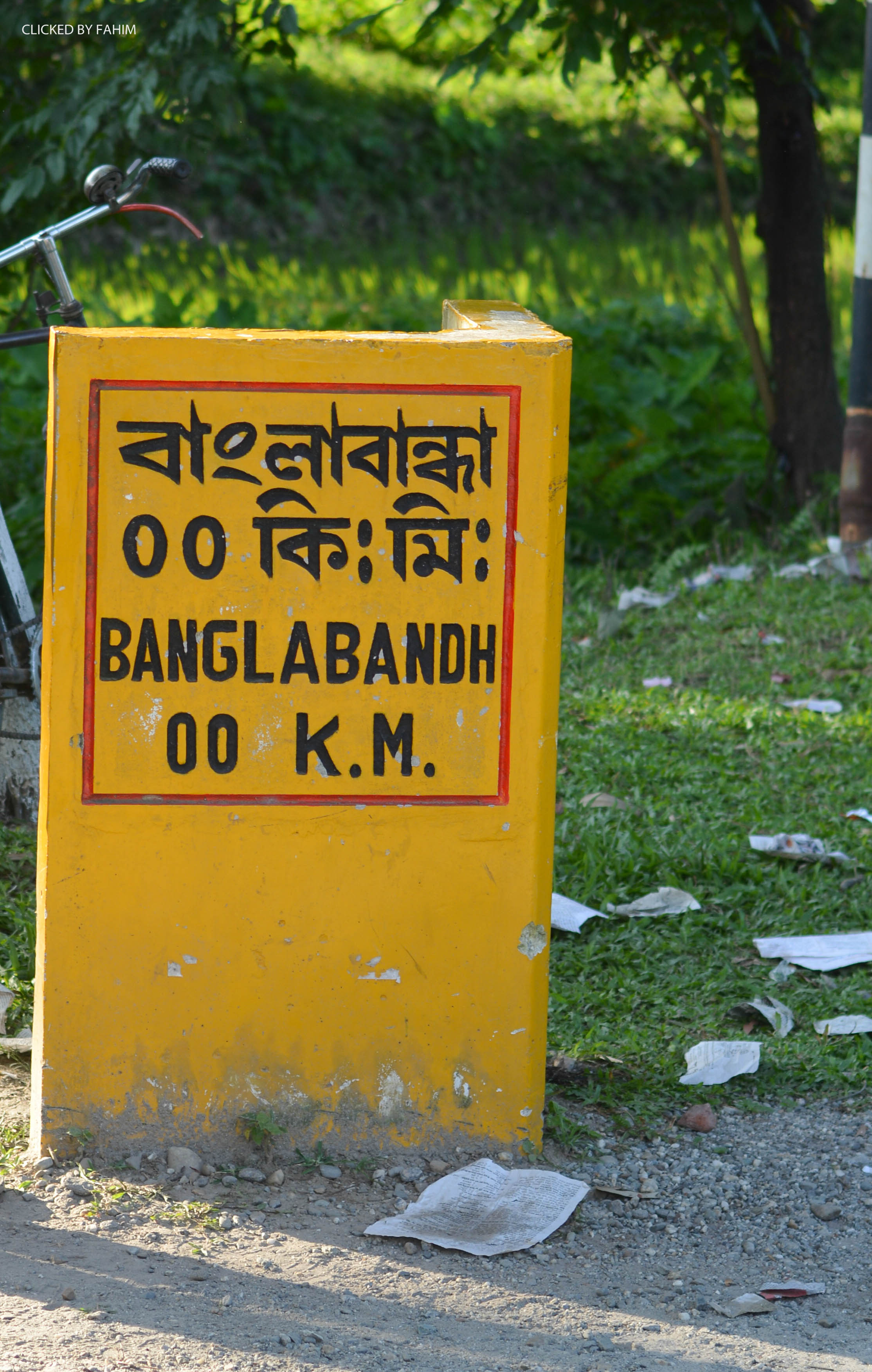

- Location within Bangladesh
- Country: Bangladesh
- Division: Rangpur
- District: Panchagarh
- Upazila: Tetulia

Area
  - Total: 22.50 km^{2} (8.69 sq mi)

Population (2011)
  - Total: 30,100
  - Density: 1,340/km^{2} (3,460/sq mi)
- Time zone: UTC+6 (BST)
- Website: banglabandhaup.panchagarh.gov.bd

Banglabandha Union (Bengali: বাংলাবান্ধা ইউনিয়ন) is a union parishad situated at Tetulia Upazila, in Panchagarh District, Rangpur Division of Bangladesh. The union has an area of 21.02 square kilometres (8.12 sq mi) and as of 2001 had a population of 7660 males and 7293 females. It has a 48.2 percent literacy rate.

Banglabandha Union contains Banglabandha land port through which Bangladesh imports stones from India.

In May 2012, locals accused Banglabandha Union Chairman Kudrat-E-Khuda of cutting road side trees illegally. On 16 September 2024, the home of Kudrat-e-Khuda Milon, chairman of Banglabandha Union parishad, was burned down by his political opponents including Bangladesh Nationalist Party activists. He was the organizing secretary of the Tentulia upazila unit of Awami League.
