= Magura Union, Panchagarh Sadar =

Magura Union মাগুরা ইউনিয়ন
- Union
- Magura Union
- Country: Bangladesh
- Division: Rangpur
- District: Panchagarh
- Upazila: Panchagarh Sadar

Area
  - Total: 53.92 km^{2} (20.82 sq mi)

Population (2011)
  - Total: 23,000
  - Density: 430/km^{2} (1,100/sq mi)
- Time zone: UTC+6 (BST)
- Website: maguraup.panchagarh.gov.bd

Magura Union (Bengali: মাগুরা ইউনিয়ন) is a union parishad situated at Panchagarh Sadar Upazila, in Panchagarh District, Rangpur Division of Bangladesh. The union has an area of 53.92 square kilometres (20.82 sq mi) and as of 2001 had a population of 27,777. There are 44 villages and 8 mouzas in the union.
