= Bhajanpur Union =

Bhajanpur Union ভজনপুর ইউনিয়ন
- Union
- Bhajanpur Union
- Location within Bangladesh
- Country: Bangladesh
- Division: Rangpur
- District: Panchagarh
- Upazila: Tetulia

Area
  - Total: 12 km^{2} (4.6 sq mi)

Population (2011)
  - Total: 23,853
  - Density: 2,000/km^{2} (5,100/sq mi)
- Time zone: UTC+6 (BST)
- Website: bhojoanpurup.panchagarh.gov.bd

Bhajanpur Union (Bengali: ভজনপুর ইউনিয়ন) is a union parishad situated at Tetulia Upazila, in Panchagarh District, Rangpur Division of Bangladesh. The union has an area of 12 square kilometres (4.6 sq mi) and as of 2001 had a population of 23,853. There are 34 villages and 8 mouzas in the union.
