= Muhammad Sultan (disambiguation) =

Muhammad Sultan may refer to:

- Mohamed Soltan (born 1987), an Egyptian American human rights advocate
- Muhammad Sultan (1538–1610), Khan of Yarkent Khanate, 1592–1610
- Muhammad Sultan (Mughal prince) (1639–1676), a son of the Mughal Emperor Aurangzeb
- Muhammad Sultan Mirza (1375–1403), a grandson of the Central Asian conqueror Timur
- Muhammad Sultan Mirza (late Timurid), a Timurid prince active against the Mughal Empire in the 16th century
- Mohammad Sultan (1926–1983), a Bangladeshi politician
- Mohammad Sultan (field hockey) (1918–1971), an Afghan field hockey player
