= Satmara Union =

Satmara Union সাতমেরা ইউনিয়ন
- Union
- Magura Union
- Country: Bangladesh
- Division: Rangpur
- District: Panchagarh
- Upazila: Panchagarh Sadar

Area
  - Total: 38.9 km^{2} (15.0 sq mi)

Population (2011)
  - Total: 29,800
  - Density: 766/km^{2} (1,980/sq mi)
- Time zone: UTC+6 (BST)
- Website: satmaraup.panchagarh.gov.bd

Satmara Union (Bengali: সাতমেরা ইউনিয়ন) is a union parishad situated at Panchagarh Sadar Upazila, in Panchagarh District, Rangpur Division of Bangladesh. The union has an area of 38.9 square kilometres (15.0 sq mi) and as of 2001 had a population of 28,800 There are 50 villages and 12 mouzas in the union.
