= Garinabari Union =

Dhakkamara Union গড়িনাবাড়ী ইউনিয়ন
- Union
- Garinabari Union
- Country: Bangladesh
- Division: Rangpur
- District: Panchagarh
- Upazila: Panchagarh Sadar

Area
  - Total: 28.39 km^{2} (10.96 sq mi)

Population (2011)
  - Total: 24,969
  - Density: 879.5/km^{2} (2,278/sq mi)
- Time zone: UTC+6 (BST)
- Website: garinabariup.panchagarh.gov.bd

Garinabari Union (Bengali: গড়িনাবাড়ী ইউনিয়ন) is a union parishad situated at Panchagarh Sadar Upazila, in Panchagarh District, Rangpur Division of Bangladesh. The union has an area of 28.39 square kilometres (10.96 sq mi) and as of 2001 had a population of 24,969. There are 54 villages and 5 mouzas in the union.
