= Sundardighi Union =

Sundardighi Union সুন্দরদিঘী ইউনিয়ন
- Union
- Sundardighi Union
- Country: Bangladesh
- Division: Rangpur
- District: Panchagarh
- Upazila: Debiganj

Area
  - Total: 22.79 km^{2} (8.80 sq mi)

Population (2011)
  - Total: 22,085
  - Density: 969.1/km^{2} (2,510/sq mi)
- Time zone: UTC+6 (BST)
- Website: sundardighiup.panchagarh.gov.bd

Sundardighi Union (Bengali: সুন্দরদিঘী ইউনিয়ন) is a union parishad situated at Debiganj Upazila, in Panchagarh District, Rangpur Division of Bangladesh. The union has an area of 22.79 square kilometres (8.80 sq mi) and as of 2001 had a population of 22,085. There are 9 villages and 6 mouzas in the union.
