= Amarkhana Union =

Amarkhana Union অমরখানা ইউনিয়ন
- Union
- Amarkhana Union
- Country: Bangladesh
- Division: Rangpur
- District: Panchagarh
- Upazila: Panchagarh Sadar

Area
  - Total: 18 km^{2} (6.9 sq mi)

Population (2011)
  - Total: 23,888
  - Density: 1,300/km^{2} (3,400/sq mi)
- Time zone: UTC+6 (BST)
- Website: amarkhanaup.panchagarh.gov.bd

Amarkhana Union (Bengali: অমরখানা ইউনিয়ন) is a union parishad situated at Panchagarh Sadar Upazila, in Panchagarh District, Rangpur Division of Bangladesh. The union has an area of 18 square kilometres (6.9 sq mi) and as of 2001 had a population of 16,942. There are 50 villages and 5 mouzas in the union.
