= Toria Union =

Toria Union তোড়িয়া ইউনিয়ন
- Union
- Location within Bangladesh
- Coordinates: 26.2640°N 88.3924°E
- Country: Bangladesh
- Division: Rangpur
- District: Panchagarh
- Upazila: Atwari

Area
  - Total: 48.43 km^{2} (18.70 sq mi)

Population (2011)
  - Total: 23,673
  - Density: 488.8/km^{2} (1,266/sq mi)
- Time zone: UTC+6 (BST)
- Website: toriaup.panchagarh.gov.bd

Toria Union (Bengali: তোড়িয়া ইউনিয়ন) is a union parishad of Atwari Upazila, Panchagarh District, Rangpur Division, Bangladesh. The union has an area of 48.43 square kilometres (18.70 sq mi) and as of 2001 had a population of 23,673. There are 11 villages and 9 mouzas in the union.
