= Dandopal Union =

Dandopal Union দণ্ডপাল ইউনিয়ন
- Union
- Dandopal Union
- Country: Bangladesh
- Division: Rangpur
- District: Panchagarh
- Upazila: Debiganj

Area
  - Total: 44.03 km^{2} (17.00 sq mi)

Population (2011)
  - Total: 21,345
  - Density: 484.8/km^{2} (1,256/sq mi)
- Time zone: UTC+6 (BST)
- Website: dandopalup.panchagarh.gov.bd

Dandopal Union (Bengali: দণ্ডপাল ইউনিয়ন) is a union parishad situated at Debiganj Upazila, in Panchagarh District, Rangpur Division of Bangladesh. The union has an area of 44.03 square kilometres (17.00 sq mi) and as of 2001 had a population of 21,345. There are 39 villages and 17 mouzas in the union.
