= Debiduba Union =

Debiduba Union দেবীডুবা ইউনিয়ন
- Union
- Debiduba Union
- Country: Bangladesh
- Division: Rangpur
- District: Panchagarh
- Upazila: Debiganj

Area
  - Total: 79.34 km^{2} (30.63 sq mi)

Population (2011)
  - Total: 23,890
  - Density: 301.1/km^{2} (779.9/sq mi)
- Time zone: UTC+6 (BST)
- Website: debidubaup.panchagarh.gov.bd

Debiduba Union (Bengali: দেবীডুবা ইউনিয়ন) is a union parishad situated at Debiganj Upazila, in Panchagarh District, Rangpur Division of Bangladesh. The union has an area of 79.34 square kilometres (30.63 sq mi) and as of 2001 had a population of 23,890. There are 73 villages and 7 mouzas in the union.
