= Tepriganj Union =

Tepriganj Union টেপ্রীগঞ্জ ইউনিয়ন
- Union
- Tepriganj Union
- Country: Bangladesh
- Division: Rangpur
- District: Panchagarh
- Upazila: Debiganj

Area
  - Total: 36.26 km^{2} (14.00 sq mi)

Population (2011)
  - Total: 25,066
  - Density: 691.3/km^{2} (1,790/sq mi)
- Time zone: UTC+6 (BST)
- Website: tepriganjup.panchagarh.gov.bd

Tepriganj Union (Bengali: টেপ্রীগঞ্জ ইউনিয়ন) is a union parishad situated at Debiganj Upazila, in Panchagarh District, Rangpur Division of Bangladesh. The union has an area of 36.26 square kilometres (14.00 sq mi) and as of 2001 had a population of 25,066. There are 25 villages and 12 mouzas in the union.
