= Chilahati Union =

Chilahati Union চিলাহাটি ইউনিয়ন
- Union
- Chilahati Union
- Country: Bangladesh
- Division: Rangpur
- District: Panchagarh
- Upazila: Debiganj

Area
  - Total: 22.50 km^{2} (8.69 sq mi)

Population (2011)
  - Total: 30,100
  - Density: 1,340/km^{2} (3,460/sq mi)
- Time zone: UTC+6 (BST)
- Website: chilahatiup.panchagarh.gov.bd

Chilahati Union (Bengali: চিলাহাটি ইউনিয়ন) is a union parishad situated at Debiganj Upazila, in Panchagarh District, Rangpur Division of Bangladesh. The union has an area of 22.50 square kilometres (8.69 sq mi) and as of 2001 had a population of 30,100. There are 68 villages and 6 mouzas in the union.
