= Panchagarh Sadar Union =

Panchagarh Sadar Union পঞ্চগড় সদর ইউনিয়ন
- Union
- Panchagarh Sadar Union
- Country: Bangladesh
- Division: Rangpur
- District: Panchagarh
- Upazila: Panchagarh Sadar

Area
  - Total: 23.31 km^{2} (9.00 sq mi)

Population (2011)
  - Total: 16,800
  - Density: 721/km^{2} (1,870/sq mi)
- Time zone: UTC+6 (BST)
- Website: maguraup.panchagarh.gov.bd

Panchagarh Sadar Union (Bengali: পঞ্চগড় সদর ইউনিয়ন) is a union parishad situated at Panchagarh Sadar Upazila, in Panchagarh District, Rangpur Division of Bangladesh. The union has an area of 23.31 square kilometres (9.00 sq mi) and as of 2001 had a population of 16,800. There are 37 villages and 5 mouzas in the union.
