= Dhamor Union =

Dhamor Union ধামোর ইউনিয়ন
- Union
- Dhamor Union
- Location within Bangladesh
- Coordinates: 26.2994°N 88.4284°E
- Country: Bangladesh
- Division: Rangpur
- District: Panchagarh
- Upazila: Atwari

Area
  - Total: 94.69 km^{2} (36.56 sq mi)

Population (2011)
  - Total: 22,000
  - Density: 230/km^{2} (600/sq mi)
- Time zone: UTC+6 (BST)
- Website: dhamorup.panchagarh.gov.bd

Dhamor Union (Bengali: ধামোর ইউনিয়ন) is a union parishad of Atwari Upazila, in Panchagarh District, Rangpur Division of Bangladesh. The union has an area of 94.69 square kilometres (36.56 sq mi) and as of 2001 had a population of 22,000. There are 13 villages and 13 mouzas in the union.
