= Hafizabad Union =

Hafizabad Union ধাক্কামারা ইউনিয়ন
- Union
- Hafizabad Union
- Country: Bangladesh
- Division: Rangpur
- District: Panchagarh
- Upazila: Panchagarh Sadar

Area
  - Total: 41.44 km^{2} (16.00 sq mi)

Population (2011)
  - Total: 16,364
  - Density: 394.9/km^{2} (1,023/sq mi)
- Time zone: UTC+6 (BST)
- Website: hafizabadup.panchagarh.gov.bd

Hafizabad Union (Bengali: হাফিজাবাদ ইউনিয়ন) is a union parishad situated at Panchagarh Sadar Upazila, in Panchagarh District, Rangpur Division of Bangladesh. The union has an area of 41.44 square kilometres (16.00 sq mi) and as of 2001 had a population of 16,364. There are 43 villages and 7 mouzas in the union.
