= Alowakhowa Union =

Alowakhowa Union আলোয়াখোয়া ইউনিয়ন
- Union
- Alowakhowa Union
- Location within Bangladesh
- Coordinates: 26.2065°N 88.3636°E
- Country: Bangladesh
- Division: Rangpur
- District: Panchagarh
- Upazila: Atwari

Area
  - Total: 96.79 km^{2} (37.37 sq mi)

Population (2011)
  - Total: 31,159
  - Density: 321.9/km^{2} (833.8/sq mi)
- Time zone: UTC+6 (BST)
- Website: alowakhowaup.panchagarh.gov.bd

Alowakhowa Union (Bengali: আলোয়াখোয়া ইউনিয়ন) is a union parishad of Atwari Upazila, in Panchagarh District, Rangpur Division of Bangladesh. The union has an area of 96.79 square kilometres (37.37 sq mi) and as of 2001 had a population of 31,159. There are 9 villages and 9 mouzas in the union.
