= Kamat Kajal Dighi Union =

Kamat Kajal Dighi Union কামাত কাজলদিঘী ইউনিয়ন
- Union
- Kamat Kajal Dighi Union
- Country: Bangladesh
- Division: Rangpur
- District: Panchagarh
- Upazila: Panchagarh Sadar

Area
  - Total: 9 km^{2} (3.5 sq mi)

Population (2011)
  - Total: 16,800
  - Density: 1,900/km^{2} (4,800/sq mi)
- Time zone: UTC+6 (BST)
- Website: kamatkajoldighiup.panchagarh.gov.bd

Kamat Kajal Dighi Union (Bengali: কামাত কাজলদিঘী ইউনিয়ন) is a union parishad situated at Panchagarh Sadar Upazila, in Panchagarh District, Rangpur Division of Bangladesh. The union has an area of 9 square kilometres (3.5 sq mi) and as of 2001 had a population of 16,800. There are 37 villages and 7 mouzas in the union.
