= Tirnaihat Union =

Tirnaihat Union তিরনইহাট ইউনিয়ন
- Union
- Tirnaihat Union
- Location within Bangladesh
- Country: Bangladesh
- Division: Rangpur
- District: Panchagarh
- Upazila: Tetulia

Area
  - Total: 20.82 km^{2} (8.04 sq mi)

Population (2011)
  - Total: 25,832
  - Density: 1,241/km^{2} (3,213/sq mi)
- Time zone: UTC+6 (BST)
- Website: bhojoanpurup.panchagarh.gov.bd

Tirnaihat Union (Bengali: তিরনইহাট ইউনিয়ন) is a union parishad situated at Tetulia Upazila, in Panchagarh District, Rangpur Division of Bangladesh. The union has an area of 20.82 square kilometres (8.04 sq mi) and as of 2001 had a population of 25,532. There are 24 villages and 8 mouzas in the union.
