= Buraburi Union =

Buraburi Union বুড়াবুড়ী ইউনিয়ন
- Union
- Buraburi Union
- Location within Bangladesh
- Country: Bangladesh
- Division: Rangpur
- District: Panchagarh
- Upazila: Tetulia

Area
  - Total: 21 km^{2} (8.1 sq mi)

Population (2011)
  - Total: 11,429
  - Density: 540/km^{2} (1,400/sq mi)
- Time zone: UTC+6 (BST)
- Website: buraburi.panchagarh.gov.bd

Buraburi Union (Bengali: বুড়াবুড়ী ইউনিয়ন) is a union parishad situated at Tetulia Upazila, in Panchagarh District, Rangpur Division of Bangladesh. The union has an area of 21 square kilometres (8.1 sq mi) and as of 2001 had a population of 11,429. There are 24 villages and 8 mouzas in the union.
