= Haribhasa Union =

Haribhasa Union হাড়িভাসা ইউনিয়ন
- Union
- Haribhasa Union
- Country: Bangladesh
- Division: Rangpur
- District: Panchagarh
- Upazila: Panchagarh Sadar

Area
  - Total: 41.44 km^{2} (16.00 sq mi)

Population (2011)
  - Total: 31,776
  - Density: 766.8/km^{2} (1,986/sq mi)
- Time zone: UTC+6 (BST)
- Website: haribhasaup.panchagarh.gov.bd

Haribhasa Union (Bengali: হাড়িভাসা ইউনিয়ন) is a union parishad situated at Panchagarh Sadar Upazila, in Panchagarh District, Rangpur Division of Bangladesh. The union has an area of 41.44 square kilometres (16.00 sq mi) and as of 2001 had a population of 31,776. There are 78 villages and 10 mouzas in the union.
