= Dhakkamara Union =

Dhakkamara Union ধাক্কামারা ইউনিয়ন
- Union
- Dhakkamara Union
- Country: Bangladesh
- Division: Rangpur
- District: Panchagarh
- Upazila: Panchagarh Sadar

Area
  - Total: 31.08 km^{2} (12.00 sq mi)

Population (2011)
  - Total: 31,445
  - Density: 1,012/km^{2} (2,620/sq mi)
- Time zone: UTC+6 (BST)
- Website: dhakkamaraup.panchagarh.gov.bd

Dhakkamara Union (Bengali: ধাক্কামারা ইউনিয়ন) is a union parishad situated at Panchagarh Sadar Upazila, in Panchagarh District, Rangpur Division of Bangladesh. The union has an area of 31.08 square kilometres (12.00 sq mi) and as of 2001 had a population of 31,445. There are 48 villages and 7 mouzas in the union.
