= Bhitargarh =

Archaeological site in Bangladesh

- Location within Bangladesh
- 26°27′00″N 88°36′36″E
- Type: Settlement
- Location: Panchagarh District, Rangpur Division, Bangladesh

History
- Built: 5th century AD
- Abandoned: 17th century AD

Site notes
- Area: 25 km^{2} (9.7 sq mi)

Bhitargarh (Bengali: ভিতরগড়) is an archaeological site that includes the remains of an ancient fort city built in and around the 5th century AD. It is located in Panchagarh District in Rangpur Division in the northern part of Bangladesh and is large enough that it can be seen from space. The archaeological significance of the site lies in its strategic position as an intersection of the trade routes between Tibet, Nepal, Bhutan and the middle and lower Ganges Valley. At its height the city stretched over 5 km by 3 km and involved rerouting the Talma River.

== History ==
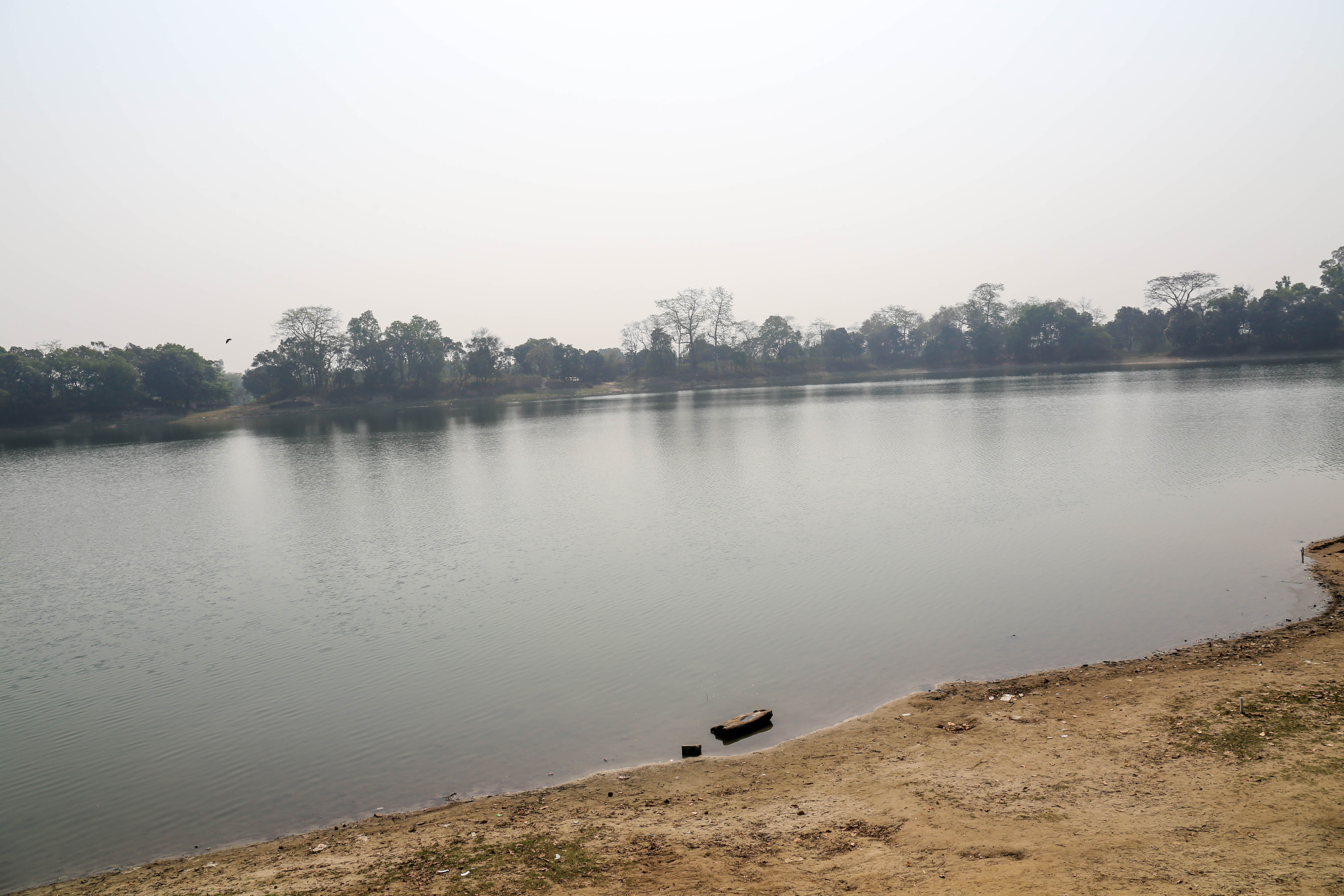
Maharaja Dighi where King Prithu committed suicide according to legend

Bhitargarh was a walled city state, the largest in the northern South Asia, and used to be the seat of King Prithu, popularly known as Maharaja. It used to be an independent city state with a sovereign government till the 13th century. Very little is known about its last sovereign, Prithu Raja, who was believed to have committed suicide because of his religion. There is a legend that Prithu Raja committed suicide along with his army at the Maharaja Dighi to protect their purity from being sullied by an invading force from the impure Kichok Tribe, which had attacked the city. The tribe is believed to be from present-day Cooch Behar District in India, located to the north of the city.

In the ancient period, Bhitargarh served as a node of important trade routes, including the Southwest Silk Road, linking the ancient kingdoms of Tibet and Yunnan with Bengal and eastern India. Its location on the bank of Karatoya River made it easier to access Tibet through the city. Its influence in connecting the ancient trade routes in the region extends from Magadha to as far as Southwest China through the Brahmaputra Valley as well as western and southeastern bank of Mekong River.

The city could have seen the arrival of Kambojas in the first half of 10th century, who were ruling the rest of Bengal at that time. It became part of the Bengal Sultanate in 1498 during the reign of Alauddin Husain Shah. Bhitargarh later fell into the Khen Kingdom and then into the Koch Kingdom and continued to serve as a trading hub till the seventeenth century when it was conquered by the Mughal Bengal under the reign of Mir Jumla II.

== Geography ==
Bhitargarh covers an area of 25 square kilometres (9.7 sq mi), situated in the Amarkhana Union of Panchagarh Sadar Upazila within the Panchagarh District. The site is covered by sand and gravel which flowed down from the Himalayan foothills by glacial waters as well as monsoon rainfalls. Topographically, the land is part of the Old Himalayan Piedmont Plains while the gravel beds belong to the Upper Pleistocene stage, similar to the rest of Panchagarh District. The Upper Pleistocene layer is further overlain by Holocene deposits, evident in the alluvium sand, silt and clay. The composition of different minerals in the Holocene gravel beds is indistinguishable from that of the Himalayas.

The site is in close proximity to two tributaries of Karatoya river, Talma and Kudum to its west and east respectively. There is also the Teesta River, flowing about 12 kilometres (7.5 mi) to the east of the site, as well as the Salmara river which flows right beside the western rampart of the city.

== Archaeological excavations ==
Excavations at Bhitargarh began in 2008 by a team from the University of Liberal Arts Bangladesh (ULAB) when the site was found in a dilapidated condition. Archaeological investigations assert that the city's territorial boundary included four "concentric quadrangles", separated by ramparts built with earth and bricks. The ramparts were further bolstered by the presence of rectangular bastions and buttresses found at regular intervals. Each of the quadrangles were also surrounded by moats. These ramparts were built to protect the city from both floods and foreign invasions. The fortified structural design of Bhitargarh conforms to the construction recommendations defined at Arthashastra.

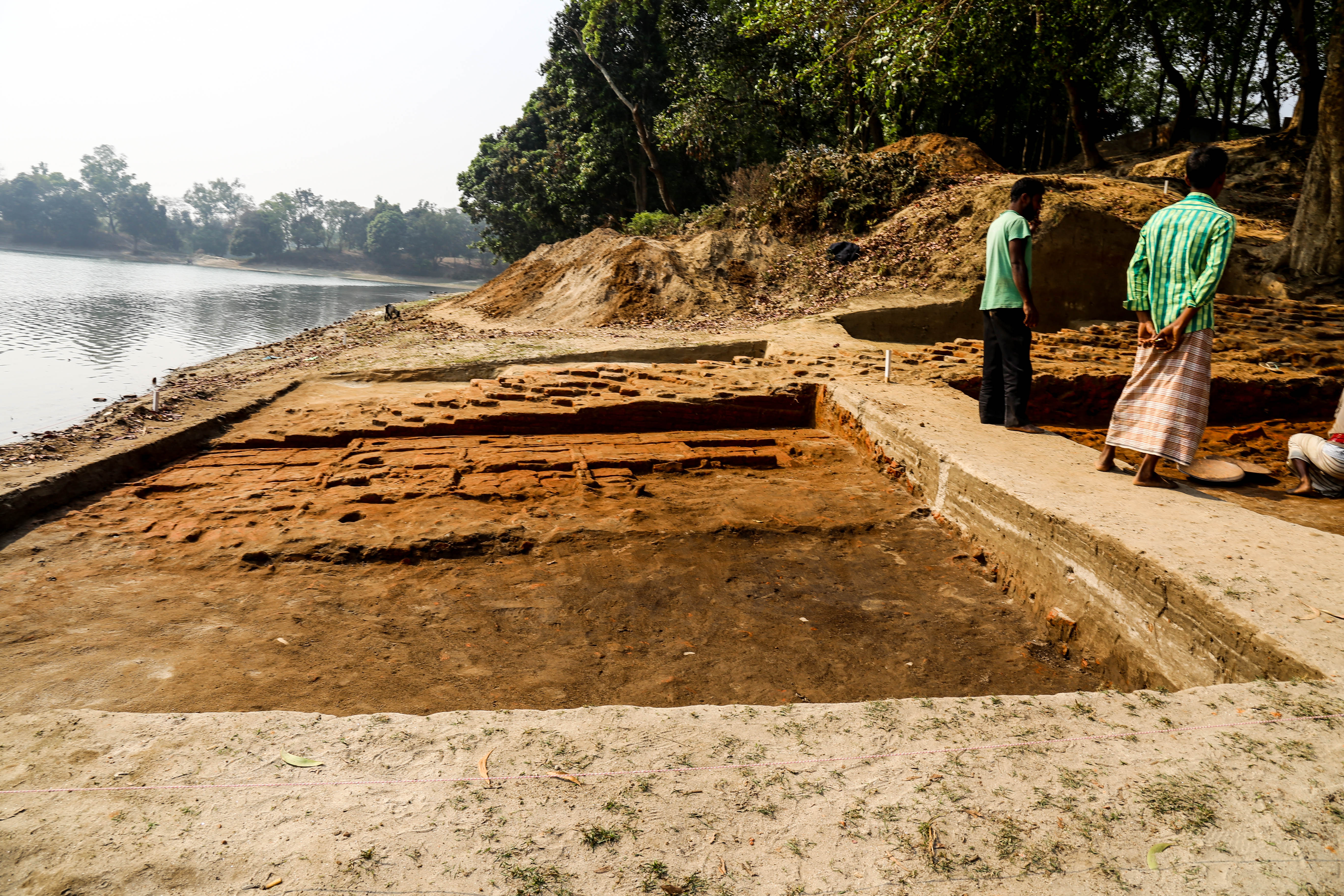
Excavation at Bhitargarh

Some foundations of religious and other monuments that trace their origin to the early medieval period have been discovered in the excavations. One of these structures is a residential complex while the rest are temples. One of the temples has a cruciform shape and has a stupa nearby which is bordered by two verandas, all situated in the first quadrangle. In the second quadrangle exist two gateways called Yama Duar or "Door of death" at the western rampart and Kala Duar or "Door of eternal time" at southern rampart. Artifacts which were discovered include pottery, clay, iron, and brass-based objects; copper and gold bangles; terracotta and stone beads as well as some stone sculptures which are believed to be from a period between 7th and 12th centuries AD. Some black basalt-based artifacts including pieces of idols of Manasa, Ramachandra and Hanuman were also discovered by local villagers. Ten ponds (dighi) also exist in the area, of which Maharajar Dighi of 53 acres is historically significant.

Archaeological studies also discovered evidence of dams in the ancient city, pointing to the advanced irrigation and cultivation system of its inhabitants. These stone-based dams were built to divert the water of Shalmara into the city during dry seasons to be utilized in agricultural and household activities. One of these dams was located at a place called Domoni at the southern rampart of the third quadrangle, used to control the water flow. There were two additional structures made of granite stones, one at Pathar-ghata and another at Kamarbhita which were built to split the course of Shalmara river into three. These structures were also used as embankments to control the level of water flow to store water at upstream. The Shalmara river then joins the Talma river at Birbandh in the northeastern part of the third quadrangle which is believed to be a man-made diversion made by the city's inhabitants.

== Threats and preservation efforts ==
Despite its considerable potential in the historical studies of the region, Bhitargarh remains threatened by continuous encroachment. The Department of Archaeology of Bangladesh government does not possess any land in the area and neither has any preservation project. As of 2019, about 40,000 people were residing within the archaeological site and were involved with agricultural activities. The people are mostly migrants from Comilla, Rangpur, Tangail, Mymensingh districts as well as recent migrants from Jalpaiguri District of India. Archaeologists believe as the migrants lack close connection with the heritage of the area, they are least interested in its preservation and as such, their continuous habitation and agricultural activities have been causing significant damage to the site.

Some community engagement programs have been arranged in the area by archaeologists to build mass-awareness about preserving the heritage of the site and protect it from further damage. A rock museum, the first of its kind in Bangladesh, was established at Panchargarh Government Women's College, displaying different artifacts discovered from Bhitargarh. In 2016, a seminar was arranged at Bangladesh National Museum in Dhaka on the preservation efforts for Bhitargarh archaeological site, attended by then Finance minister of Bangladesh, Abul Maal Abdul Muhith as the chief guest. An allocation of 20 crore BDT was demanded and a permanent custodian office was recommended to establish at the site for its preservation.

== See also ==
- Mahasthangarh, another ancient city in the region
- Varendra
- Pundravardhana
