= Pamuli Union =

Pamuli Union পামুলী ইউনিয়ন
- Union
- Pamuli Union
- Country: Bangladesh
- Division: Rangpur
- District: Panchagarh
- Upazila: Debiganj

Area
  - Total: 21 km^{2} (8.1 sq mi)

Population (2011)
  - Total: 19,607
  - Density: 930/km^{2} (2,400/sq mi)
- Time zone: UTC+6 (BST)
- Website: pamuliup.panchagarh.gov.bd

Pamuli Union (Bengali: পামুলী ইউনিয়ন) is a union parishad situated at Debiganj Upazila, in Panchagarh District, Rangpur Division of Bangladesh. The union has an area of 21 square kilometres (8.1 sq mi) and as of 2001 had a population of 19,607. There are 14 villages and 8 mouzas in the union.
