= Balarampur Union, Atwari =

Balarampur Union বলরামপুর ইউনিয়ন
- Union
- Balarampur Union
- Location within Bangladesh
- Coordinates: 26.1988°N 88.5188°E
- Country: Bangladesh
- Division: Rangpur
- District: Panchagarh
- Upazila: Atwari

Area
  - Total: 78.53 km^{2} (30.32 sq mi)

Population (2011)
  - Total: 24,171
  - Density: 307.8/km^{2} (797.2/sq mi)
- Time zone: UTC+6 (BST)
- Website: balarampurup.panchagarh.gov.bd

Balarampur Union (Bengali: বলরামপুর ইউনিয়ন) is a union parishad of Atwari Upazila, in Panchagarh District, Rangpur Division of Bangladesh. The union has an area of 78.53 square kilometres (30.32 sq mi) and as of 2001 had a population of 24,171. There are 10 villages and 10 mouzas in the union.
