= Mirzapur Union, Atwari =

Mirzapur Union মির্জাপুর ইউনিয়ন
- Union
- Mirzapur Union
- Country: Bangladesh
- Division: Rangpur
- District: Panchagarh
- Upazila: Atwari

Area
  - Total: 96.76 km^{2} (37.36 sq mi)

Population (2011)
  - Total: 24,465
  - Density: 252.8/km^{2} (654.9/sq mi)
- Time zone: UTC+6 (BST)
- Website: mirgapurup.panchagarh.gov.bd

Mirzapur Union (Bengali: মির্জাপুর ইউনিয়ন) is a union parishad of Atwari Upazila, in Panchagarh District, Rangpur Division of Bangladesh.

== Geography and demographics ==
The union has an area of 96.76 square kilometres (37.36 sq mi) and as of 2001 had a population of 24,465. There are 36 villages and 12 mouzas in the union.
