= Nripendra Narayan Government High School =

- নৃপেন্দ্র নারায়ন সরকারি উচ্চ বিদ্যালয়
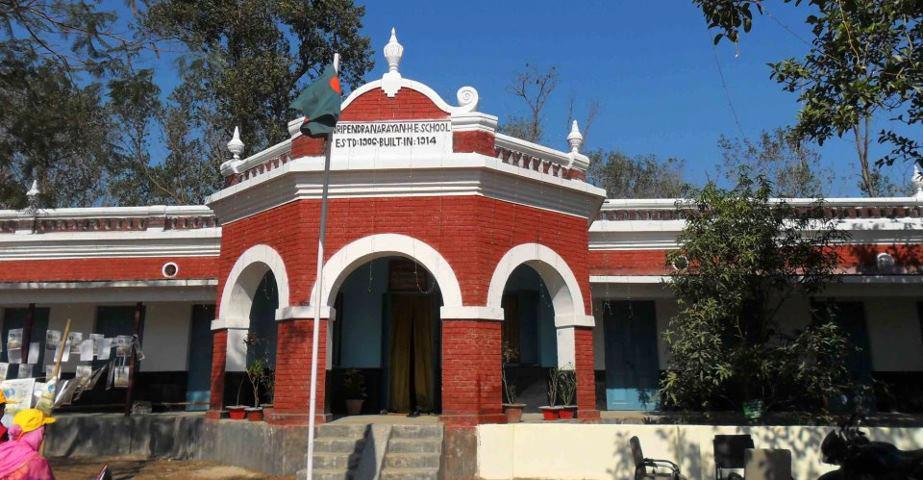
- Debiganj N.N. High School

Location
- Debiganj, Panchagarh District, 5020; Bangladesh; 26.1169°N 88.7574°E

Information
- Type: Boys High School
- Motto: Education for Peace and Progress
- Established: 1906
- Founder: Nripendra Narayan
- School board: Dinajpur Education Board
- Principal: G.M Ruhul Amin
- Grades: 6 to 10
- Language: Bengali
- Campus size: 30 acre
- Colors: White and Khaki
- Sports: Football, cricket, volleyball, badminton, handball.
- Team name: N.N SCHOOL
- Newspaper: (NONE)
- Website: http://nngovhs.edu.bd

Nripendra Narayan Government High School (Bengali: নৃপেন্দ্র নারায়ন সরকারি উচ্চ বিদ্যালয়) is a secondary school located in Debiganj, Debiganj Upazila, Panchagarh District, Bangladesh. It was founded in 1906 by Maharaja Nripendra Narayan. This school is also known as Debiganj N.N. Govt. High School (N.N School). Secondary School Certificate examination under Dinajpur Education Board.

== History ==
Nripendra Narayan Government High School is founded in 1906 by Nripendra Narayan Bhup Bahadur, Maharaja of Cooch Behar. The school was founded on the east bank of Korotoya River. Originally named Nripendra Narayan English School, the name was styled as to a Bangla version. At that time it was a highly regarded school in Jalpaiguri District. Student also came here from Asam, Cooch Beher, Jalpaiguri and Darjiling. There were two residential boarding for the student. One was for the Muslim students and other was for the Hindu students. Then for some problems the authority closed those boardings. And for this reason students stopped to come here from long distances. But the local students continued to study here. In 1987 after being a government school its name changed to Nripendra Narayan Government High School also called N.N Govt. High School). And now the school is well known in Panchagarh District of Independent Bangladesh.
