= Shalbahan Union =

Shalbahan Union শালবাহান ইউনিয়ন
- Union
- Shalbahan Union
- Location within Bangladesh
- Country: Bangladesh
- Division: Rangpur
- District: Panchagarh
- Upazila: Tetulia

Area
  - Total: 30.38 km^{2} (11.73 sq mi)

Population (2011)
  - Total: 22,000
  - Density: 720/km^{2} (1,900/sq mi)
- Time zone: UTC+6 (BST)
- Website: salbahanup.panchagarh.gov.bd

Shalbahan Union (Bengali: শালবাহান ইউনিয়ন) is a union parishad situated at Tetulia Upazila, in Panchagarh District, Rangpur Division of Bangladesh. The union has an area of 30.38 square kilometres (11.73 sq mi) and as of 2001 had a population of 22,000. There are 43 villages and 6 mouzas in the union.
