= Debiganj Alodini Government Girls High School =

Coordinates: 26.1194°N 88.7589°E

Debiganj Alodini Govt. Girls' High School
- অলদিনী সরকারী বালিকা উচ্চ বিদ্যালয়
- Debiganj; Debiganj Upazila; Debiganj, 5020; Bangladesh

Information
- School type: Govt. Girls' High School
- Established: 1970
- School board: Dinajpur
- School district: Panchagarh
- Principal: Prodip Kumar Singh
- Grades: 6-10
- Language: Bengali
- Colours: Blue and White
- Nickname: Alodini Balika Bidyalaya
- Website: alodinischool.edu.bd

Debiganj Alodini Govt. Girls' High School (Bengali: অলদিনী সরকারী বালিকা উচ্চ বিদ্যালয়) is a girls high school in Debiganj, Debiganj Upazila, Panchagarh District, Bangladesh. Secondary School Certificate examination under Dinajpur Education Board.
