= Debiganj Union =

Debiganj Union দেবীগঞ্জ ইউনিয়ন
- Union
- Debiganj Union
- Country: Bangladesh
- Division: Rangpur
- District: Panchagarh
- Upazila: Debiganj
- Established: 1938

Area
  - Union: 13.00 km^{2} (5.02 sq mi)
  - Rural: 13.00 km^{2} (5.02 sq mi)

Population (2011)
  - Union: 32,648
  - Density: 2,511/km^{2} (6,504/sq mi)
- Time zone: UTC+6 (BST)
- Website: debiganjsadarup.panchagarh.gov.bd

Debiganj Union (Bengali: দেবীগঞ্জ ইউনিয়ন) is a union parishad situated at Debiganj Upazila, in Panchagarh District, Rangpur Division of Bangladesh. The union has an area of 13.00 square kilometres (5.02 sq mi) and as of 2001 had a population of 32,648. There are 10 villages and 7 mouzas in the union.
