= Radhanagar Union =

Radhanagar Union may refer to:

- Radhanagar Union, Raipura, a union in Raipura Upazila
- Radhanagar Union, Atwari, a union in Atwari Upazila
