= Panchagarh Government Women's College =

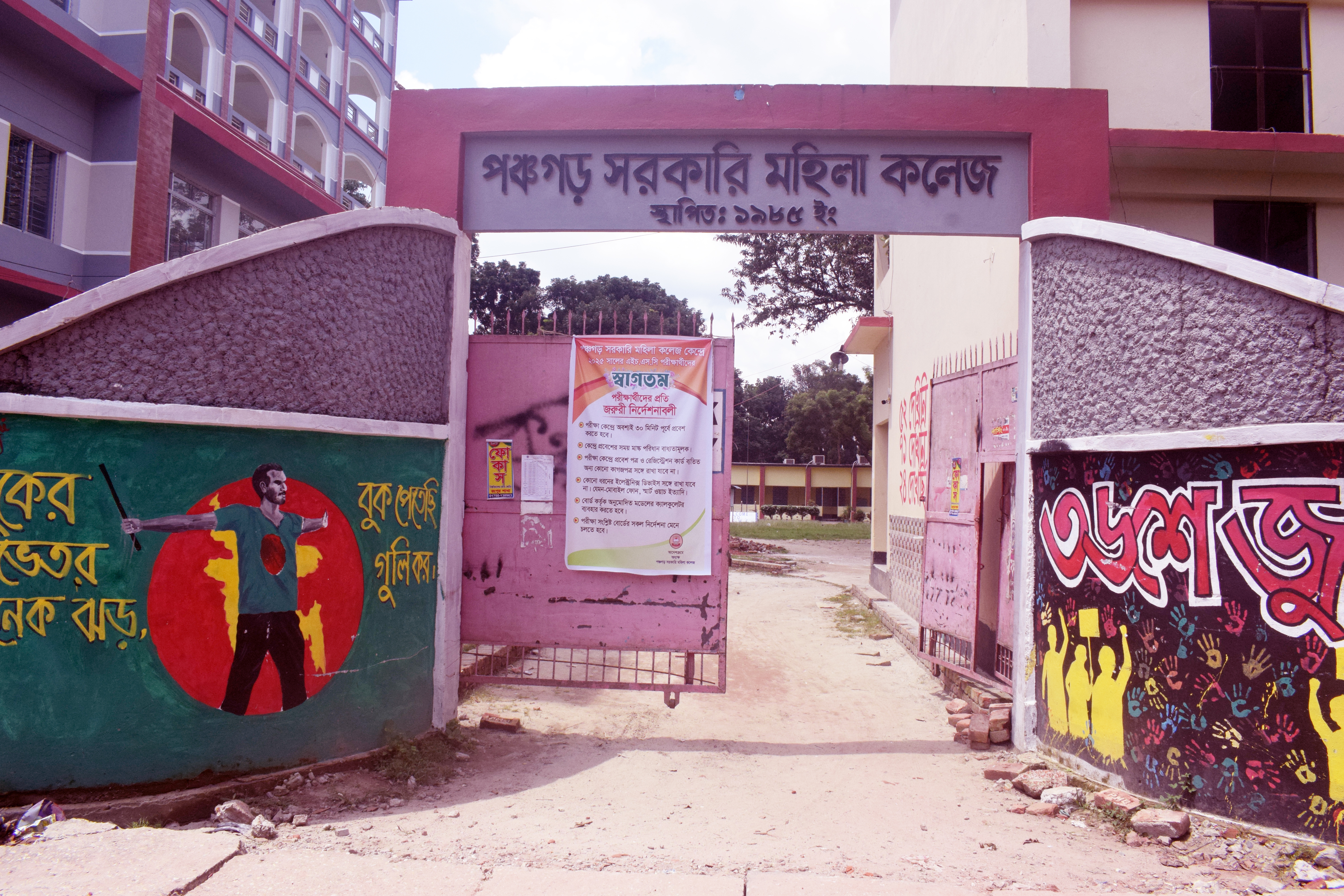
- Other name: PGWC
- Type: Government college
- Established: 1985
- Location: Panchagarh, 5000, Bangladesh; 26.3348°N 88.5592°E
- Website: pgwc.edu.bd

Panchagarh Government Women's College is a government educational institution located in Panchagarh, Bangladesh. It was established in 1985.

== History ==
Panchagarh Government Women's College was founded on July 1, 1985. It was first nationalized in 1990, but the decision was repealed in 1991. However, on March 27, 1997, the college was nationalized once again by Prime Minister Sheikh Hasina, making it the sole government women's college in the district.

In 2012, students and parents formed a human chain and marched to protest a shortage of teachers. At that time 19 of 54 lecturer posts were vacant. As lecturers were promoted, they were transferred elsewhere, with the result that the college had no associate or assistant professors.

In 2014, The college ranked among the top 20 under the Board of Intermediate and Secondary Education, Dinajpur.

Principal Mainur Rahman, appointed in October 2021, attracted criticism when he converted a college classroom and washroom into a residence for himself and several teachers, this despite the facts that they draw a government housing stipend and classrooms are in short supply.

Approximately six thousand students attend the college. The college offers 22 subjects at the Higher Secondary Certificate (HSC) level, 20 subjects at the undergraduate (pass) level, and 9 subjects at the undergraduate (honors) level.

Notably, the college is home to the country's first "Rock Museum," established by Dr. Md. Nazmul Haque, the former chairman of the college. The museum showcases a diverse collection of archaeological and folk artifacts from Panchagarh district, totaling more than 1,000 items.

== Departments ==
Panchagarh Government Women's College currently offers honors courses in nine subjects, catering to a student population exceeding six thousand. The departments available for honours courses are:

1. Bangla
2. Economics
3. History
4. Islamic History
5. Geography
6. Philosophy
7. Mathematics
8. Management
9. Marketing
