= Mohammad Sultan =

Indian politician

Mohammad Sultan (24 December 1926 – 31 December 1983) was a Bangladeshi politician and language activist of the Bengali language movement.

== Early life ==
He was born at Panchagarh on 24 December 1926. He was the son of Shomsher Ali and Gulzannessa. He passed entrance examination from Jessore Zilla School. He received his Honors from Rajshahi College in and finished his master's degree in political science in 1953 from the University of Dhaka.

== Political career ==
Mohammad Sultan was inspired by Quit India movement in his youth and joined in Pakistan Movement in 1946. In 1948, he helped to organize the Language Movement in Rajshahi. He joined the Jubo League in 1951 and became the joint secretary of its central committee. He also took part in the Language Movement from Dhaka University in 1952 and at the end of the year became the Chairman of the newly born Students' Union. He worked extremely hard to establish the Union and continued his work at the Jubo League. After the separation of political party NAP, Sultan joined the faction led by Maulana Bhasani. Later he started publishing political literature with M.R.Akhtar Mukul. He also published the famous collection on Bengali Language Movement "Ekushey February" on 1953. Muslim League run government eventually banned the collection. Mohammad Sultan had to suffer a considerable period of his life in jail. In 1954, he was arrested and kept imprisoned for about a year. After the beginning of Martial law in Pakistan in 1958, Sultan was again arrested and served in jail for four years without any specific trial. He was a lifetime member of Bangla Academy and vice-chairman of Bangladesh Book Publishers Committee.

Road Number 3 in Dhanmondi is named after him.
