= Tetulia Upazila =

Tetulia তেতুলিয়া
- Upazila
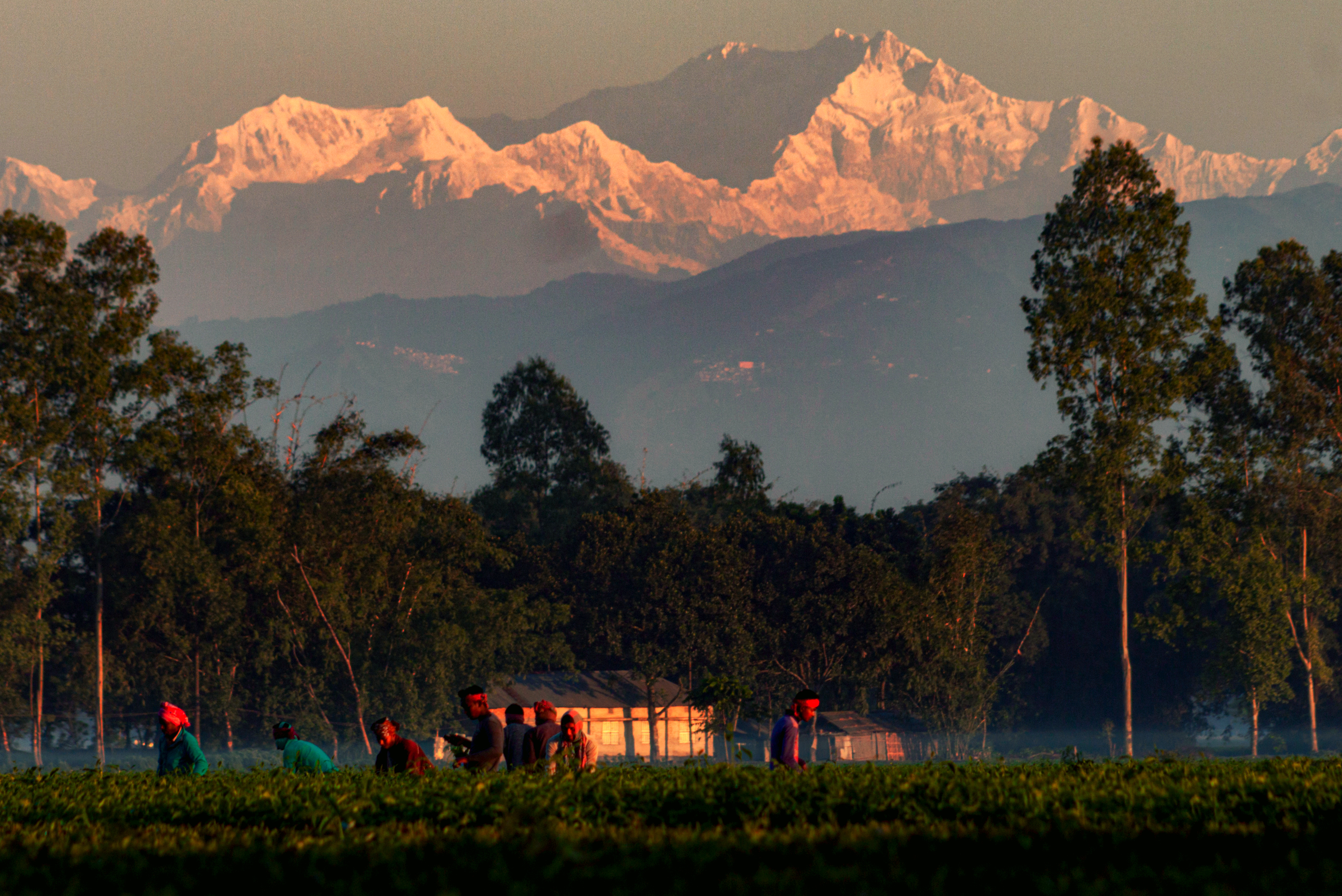
- Tea garden in Tetulia, with Kangchenjunga at the background

- Coordinates: 26°29′N 88°21′E
- Country: Bangladesh
- Division: Rangpur
- District: Panchagarh

Area
  - Total: 189.12 km^{2} (73.02 sq mi)

Population (2022)
  - Total: 160,180
  - Density: 846.98/km^{2} (2,193.7/sq mi)
- Time zone: UTC+6 (BST)
- Postal code: 5030
- Area code: 0568

Tetulia Upazila mauza geocode map

Tetulia (Bengali: তেতুলিয়া), historically spelt as Tentulia, is the northernmost region of Bangladesh, constituting an upazila in Panchagarh District of Rangpur Division. Tetulia is geographically the northernmost tip of Bangladesh. Tetulia is notable for its tea. Tetulia is also notable for views of Kangchenjunga, the third highest mountain in the world, from its plains, rivers and tea gardens.

== Etymology ==
Tentula is the Bengali word for tamarind.

== Demographics ==
Religions in Tetulia Upazila (2022)
Religion	Percent
Islam	97.62%
Hinduism	2.19%
Other or not stated	0.19%

According to the 2022 Bangladeshi census, Tetulia Upazila had 36,471 households and a population of 160,180. 11.30% of the population were under 5 years of age. Tetulia had a literacy rate (age 7 and over) of 71.78%: 74.40% for males and 69.09% for females, and a sex ratio of 102.63 males for every 100 females. 19,809 (12.37%) lived in urban areas.

According to the 2011 Census of Bangladesh, Tetulia Upazila had 27,908 households and a population of 125,454. 30,869 (24.61%) were under 10 years of age. Tetulia had a literacy rate (age 7 and over) of 47.32%, compared to the national average of 51.8%, and a sex ratio of 977 females per 1000 males. 5,506 (4.39%) lived in urban areas.

As of the 1991 Bangladesh census, Tetulia has a population of 86760. Males constitute 51.52% of the population, and females 48.48%. This Upazila's eighteen up population is 42021. Tetulia has an average literacy rate of 25.5% (7+ years), and the national average of 32.4% literate.

== Economy ==
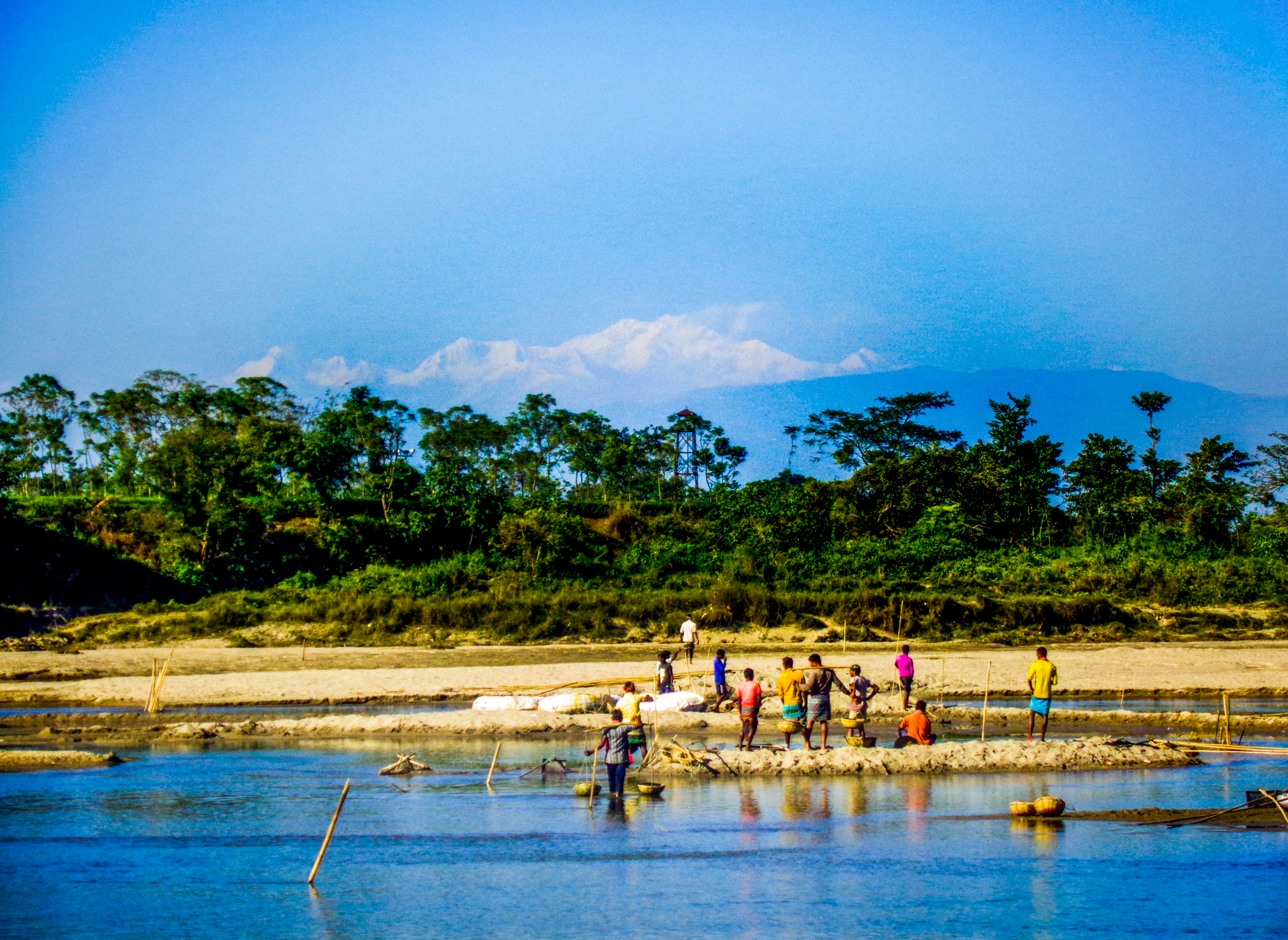
Mahananda River

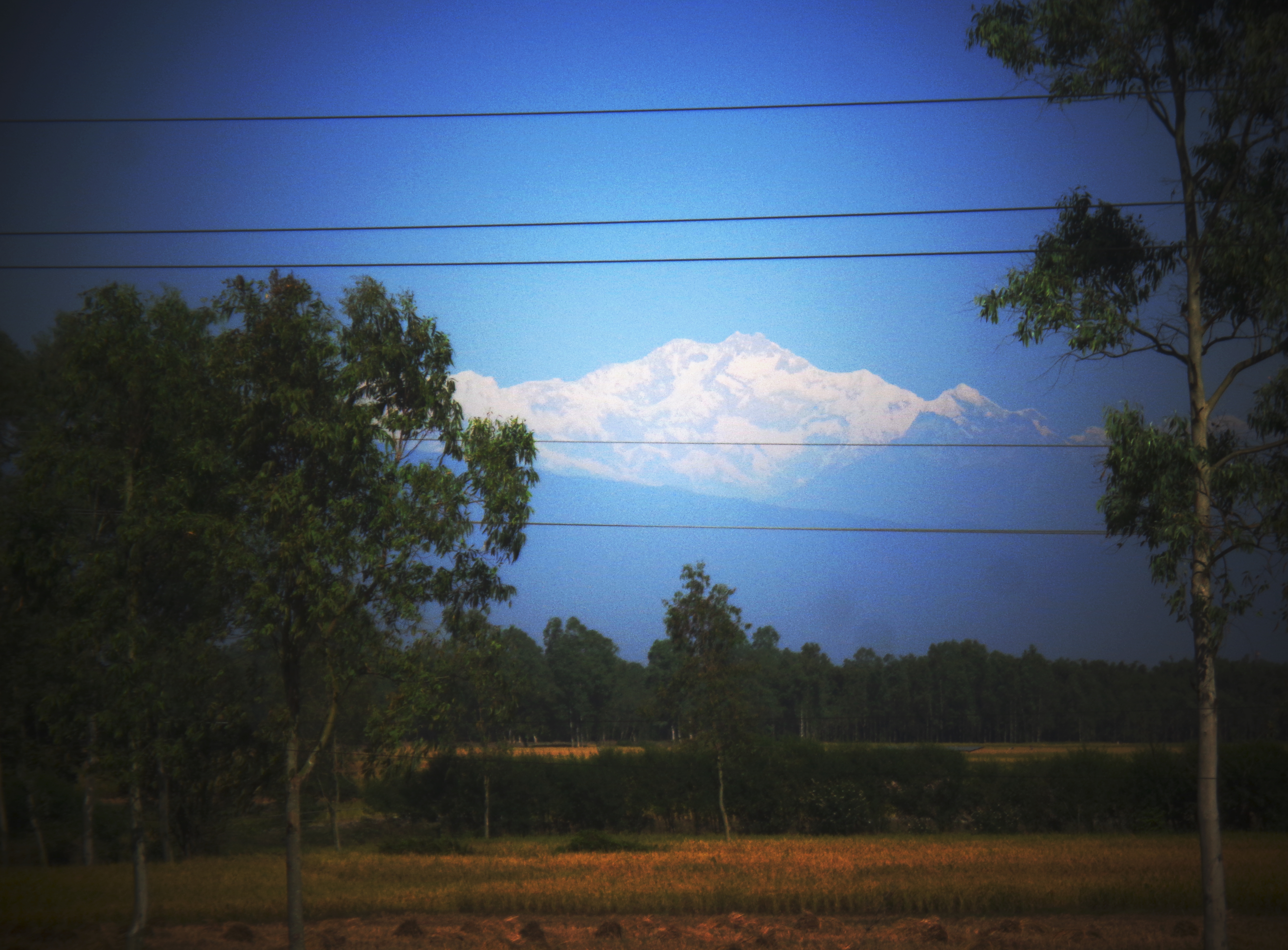
Himalayan views, especially of Kanchenjunga, attract many tourists to Tetulia

The cultivation of tea, orange and pineapple is abundant in Tetulia. It is located on the Indian border with Darjeeling. Gemcon Group initiated tea plantation in Tetulia by establishing their Kazi And Kazi Tea Estate. Later other tea gardens have been established. Stone-extraction is also flourishing here.

== Points of interest ==
- Kazi & Kazi Tea Estate, Rowshanpur
- Banglabandha Land port
- Sharial Tea Garden
- Asian Highway
- Tetultola, Tetulia Chourasta
- Tetulia Gate

== Administration ==
UNO: AFROZ SHAHIN KHOSRU.

Tetulia Upazila is divided into seven union parishads: Banglabandha, Bhajanpur, Buraburi, Devnagar, Shalbahan, Tetulia, and Tirnaihat. The union parishads are subdivided into 36 mauzas and 246 villages.

The post code of Tetulia is 5030.

== Transport ==
Tetulia is connected by roads. The closest airport is Saidpur Airport, which is 130 km far from the town. Several bus companies (especially Hanif Enterprise, Shyamoli Paribahan and Burimari Express) operate their services from Dhaka. Teknaf and Tetulia are the two farthest points in the country, with about 1,004 kilometers between them.

== Gallery ==
Titalia, 1891 map of Assam

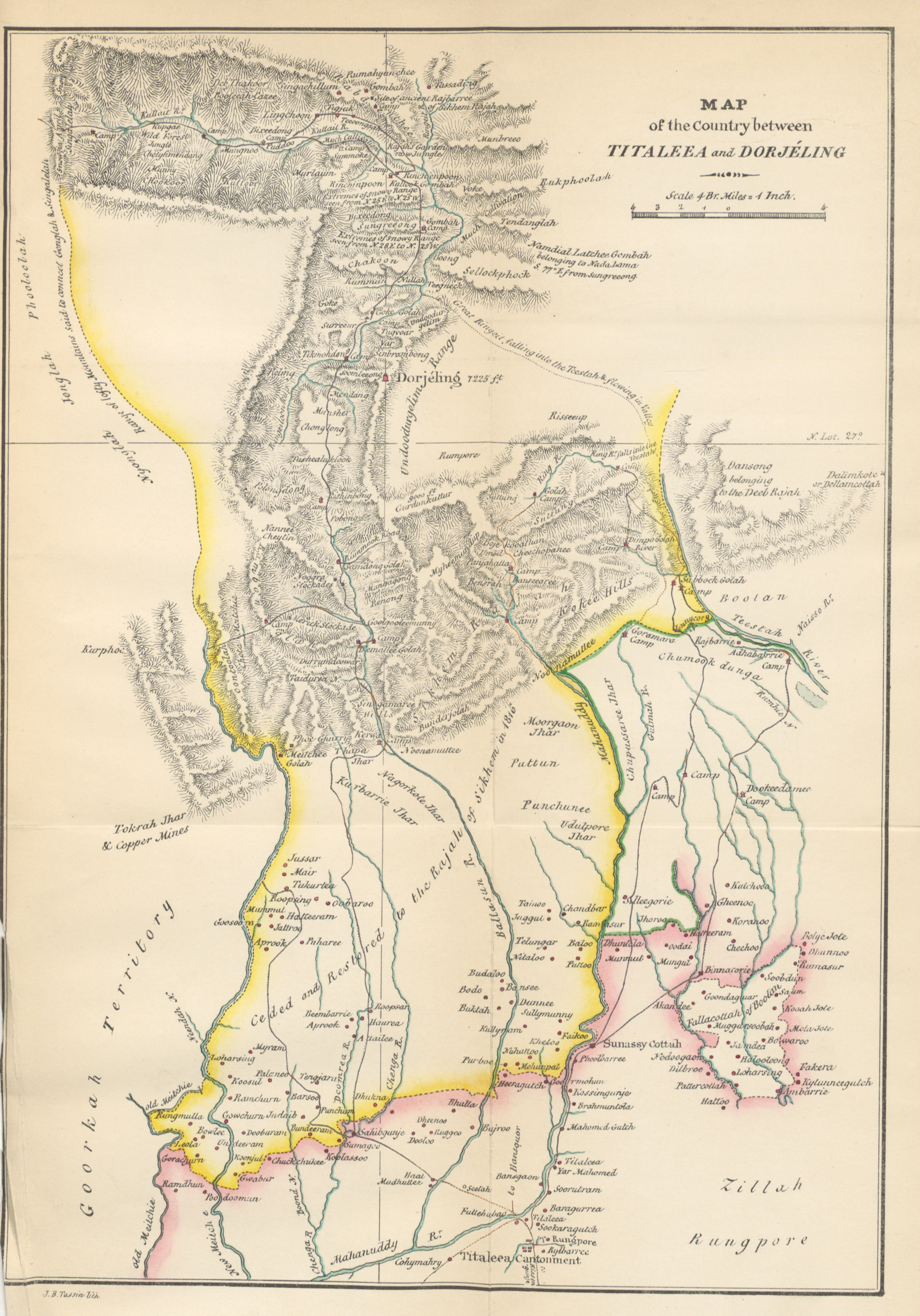
1838 map of country between Titaleea and Darjeeling

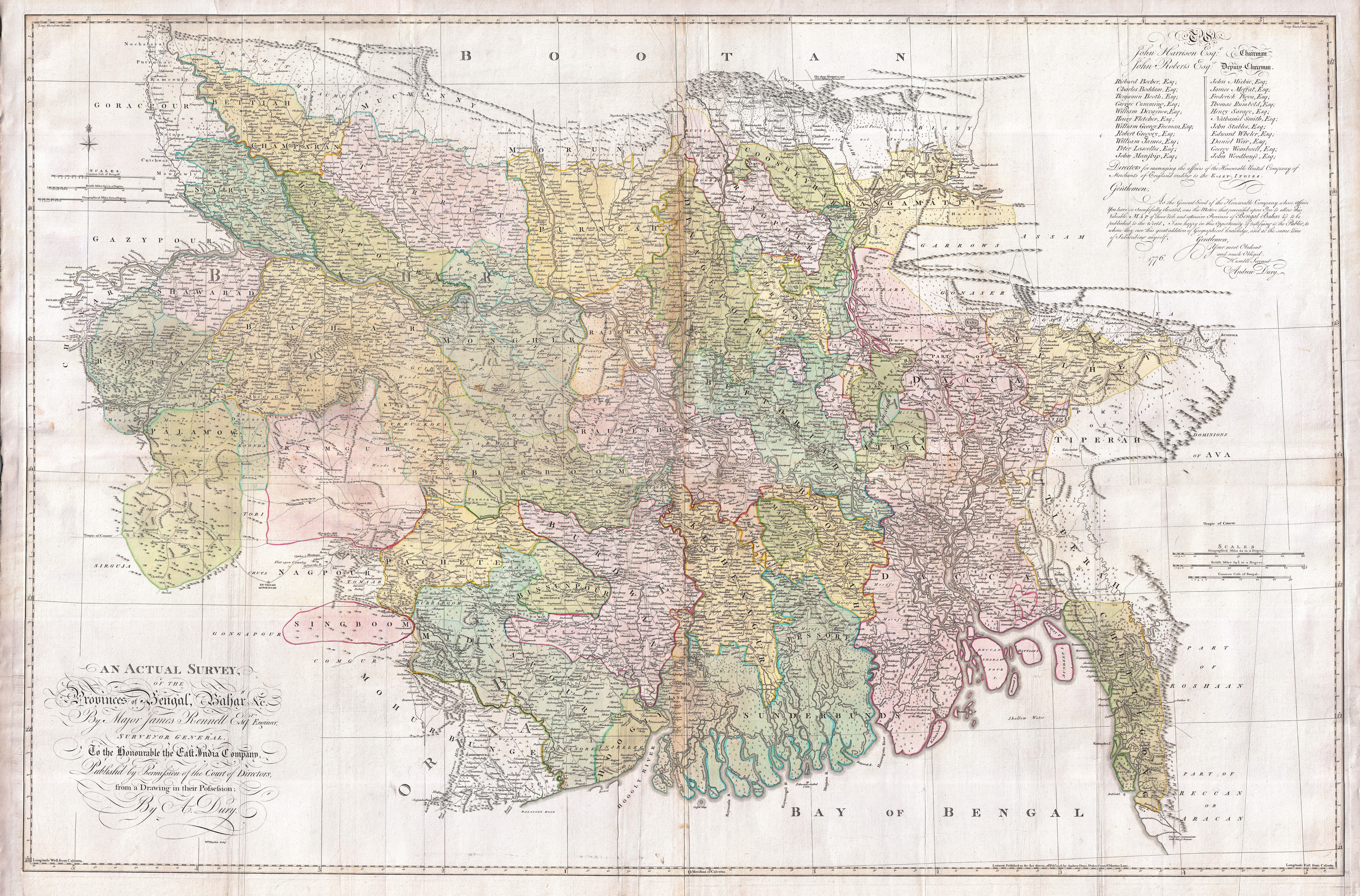
Titulya, on a 1776 map by James Rennell

== See also ==
- Upazilas of Bangladesh
- Districts of Bangladesh
- Divisions of Bangladesh
