= Atwari Upazila =

Atwari আটোয়ারী
- Upazila
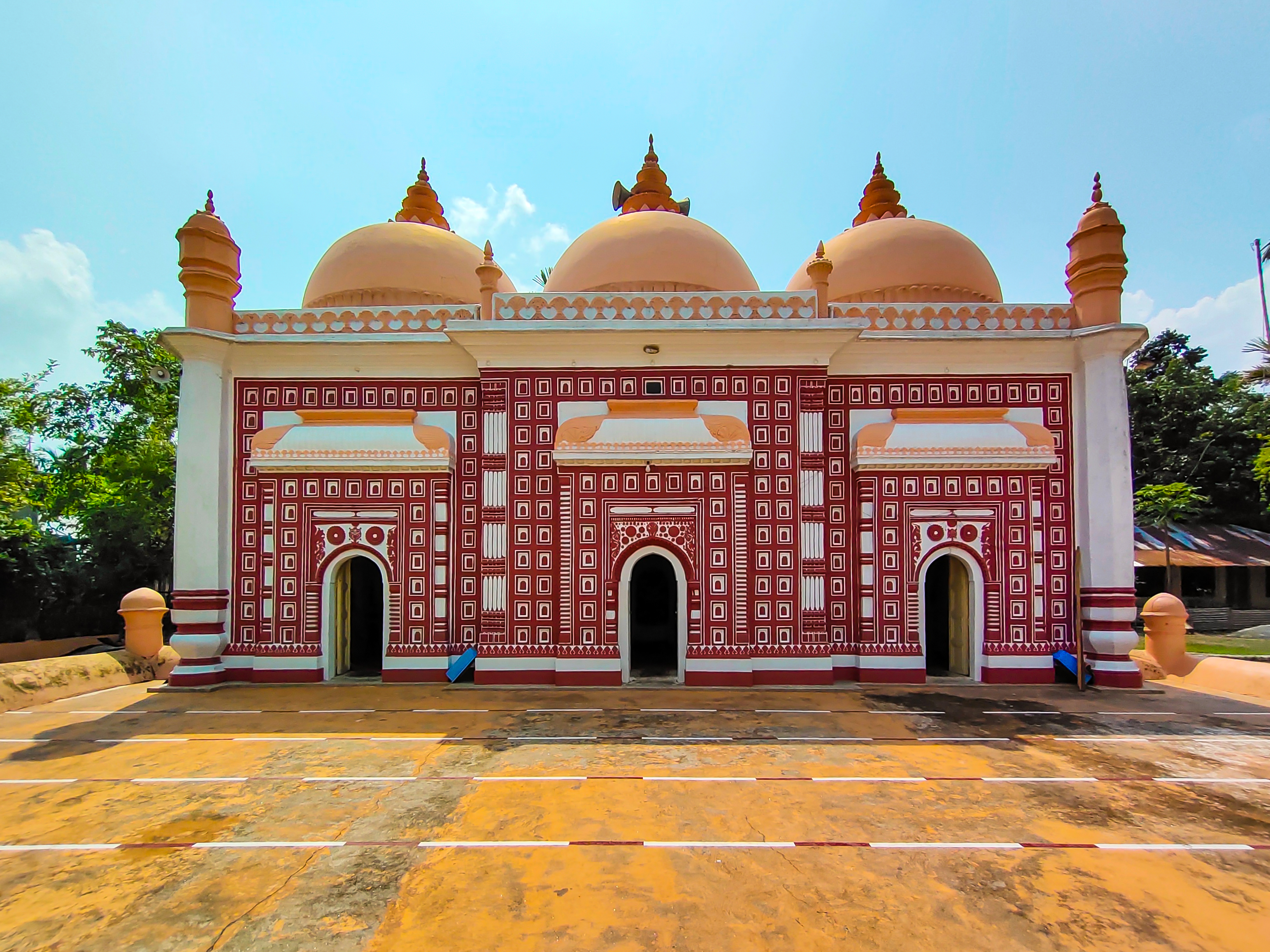
- Mirzapur Shahi Mosque

- Coordinates: 26°18.5′N 88°27.5′E
- Country: Bangladesh
- Division: Rangpur
- District: Panchagarh

Area
  - Total: 209.92 km^{2} (81.05 sq mi)

Population (2022)
  - Total: 141,549
  - Density: 674.30/km^{2} (1,746.4/sq mi)
- Time zone: UTC+6 (BST)
- Postal code: 5040
- Website: Official Map of Atwari

Atwari Upazila mauza geocode map

Atwari (Bengali: আটোয়ারী) is an upazila of Panchagarh District in Rangpur, Bangladesh.

The upazila comprises six union councils.

== Geography ==
Atwari is located at 26.3083°N 88.4583°E. It has 32,045 households and total area 209.92 km^{2}.

Atwari upazila is bounded by Chopra CD block in Uttar Dinajpur district, West Bengal, India, on a portion of the north, Boda Upazila on a portion of the north and on the east, Thakurgaon Sadar and Baliadangi upazilas on the south and Islampur CD block in Uttar Dinajpur district, on the west.

== River ==
Atwari has 3 rivers.

- Tangon River
- Nagar River
- Pathraj River

== Demographics ==
Religions in Atwari Upazila (2022)
Religion	Percent
Islam	74.18%
Hinduism	24.72%
Christianity	1.09%
Other or not stated	0.01%

According to the 2022 Bangladeshi census, Atwari Upazila had 35,352 households and a population of 141,549. 9.54% of the population were under 5 years of age. Atwari had a literacy rate (age 7 and over) of 76.19%: 80.64% for males and 71.84% for females, and a sex ratio of 98.06 males for every 100 females. 14,178 (10.02%) lived in urban areas. Ethnic population is 757 (0.53%).

According to the 2011 Census of Bangladesh, Atwari Upazila had 32,045 households and a population of 133,650. 31,033 (23.22%) were under 10 years of age. Atwari had a literacy rate (age 7 and over) of 59.81%, compared to the national average of 51.8%, and a sex ratio of 1003 females per 1000 males. 11,274 (8.44%) lived in urban areas.

As of the 1991 Bangladesh census, Atwari has a population of 103,906. Males constitute 51.42% of the population, and females 48.58%. This Upazila's eighteen up population is 52,469. Atwari has an average literacy rate of 37.8% (7+ years), and the national average of 32.4% literate.

== Administration ==
UNO: Md. Shafiul Mazlubin Rahman.

Atwari Upazila is divided into six union parishads: Alowakhowa, Balarampur, Dhamor, Mirzapur, Radhanagar, and Toria. The union parishads are subdivided into 62 mauzas and 64 villages.

== Notable people ==
- Abdur Rahman (1937–2005), actor
- Naimuzzaman Bhuiyan (born 1973), politician
- Sarjis Alam (born 1998), July Revolution activist
- Mirza family of Atwari
  - Mirza Ghulam Hafiz (1920–2000), Lawyer, Minister (1976), 2nd Parliament Speaker (1979), Minister (1991), Philanthropist, Language Activist
  - Mirza Ruhul Amin (1921–1997), Government Minister
  - Mirza Fakhrul Islam Alamgir (born 1948), Minister of State for Civil Aviation and Tourism

== See also ==
- Upazilas of Bangladesh
- Districts of Bangladesh
- Divisions of Bangladesh
