= Debiganj Upazila =

Debiganj Upazila দেবীগঞ্জ উপজেলা
- Upazila
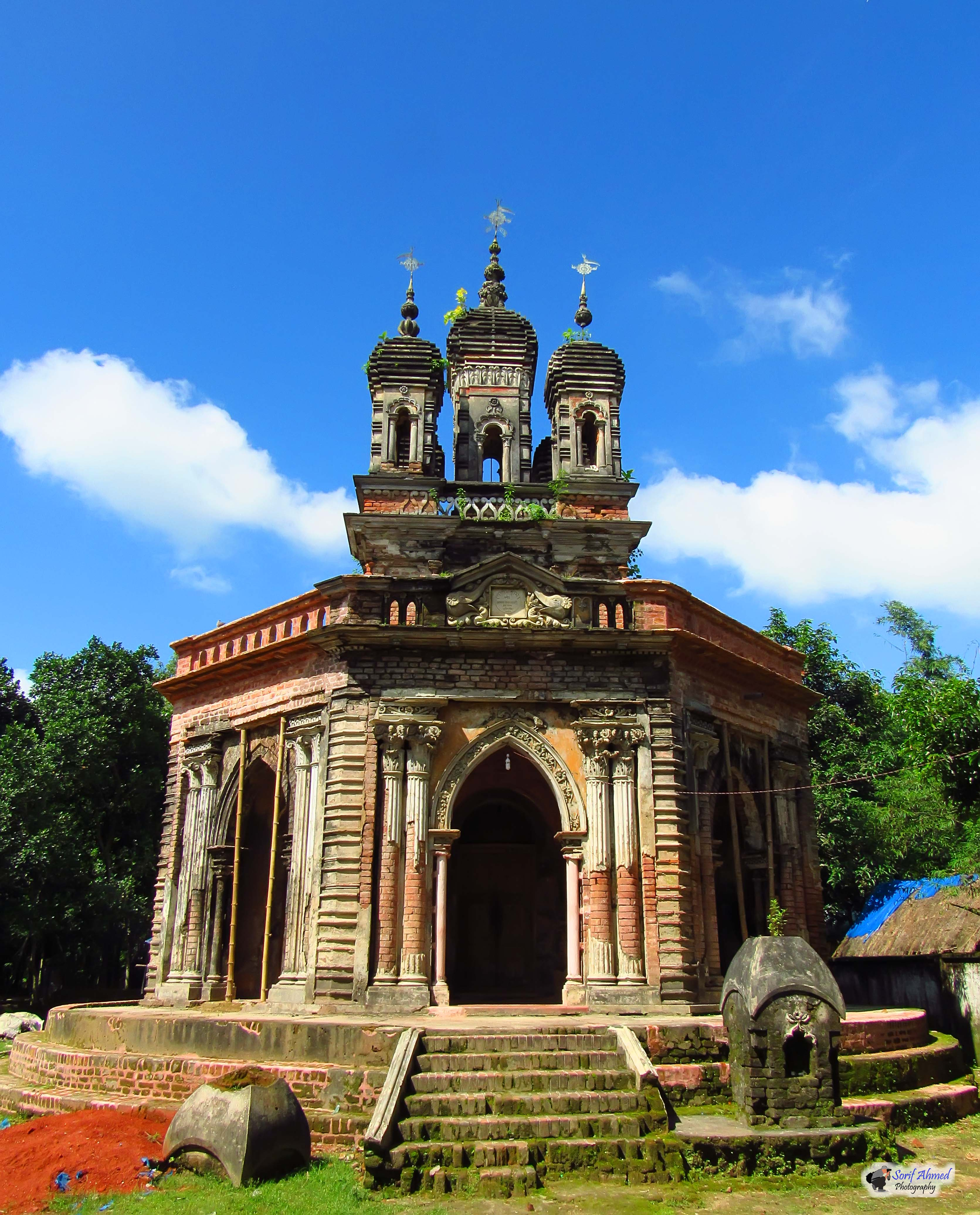
- Golok Dham Temple

- Coordinates: 26°7.1′0″N 88°45.6′0″E
- Country: Bangladesh
- Division: Rangpur
- District: Panchagarh
- Headquarters: Debiganj

Area
  - Total: 309.04 km^{2} (119.32 sq mi)

Population (2022)
  - Total: 267,466
  - Density: 865.47/km^{2} (2,241.6/sq mi)
- Time zone: UTC+6 (BST)
- Postal code: 5020
- Website: debiganj.panchagarh.gov.bd

Debiganj Upazila mauza geocode map

Debiganj (Bengali: দেবীগঞ্জ) is an upazila of Panchagarh District in Rangpur Division, Bangladesh.

== Geography ==
Debiganj Upazila is located at 26.11858°N 88.759299°E. It has a total area 309.04 km^{2}.

It is bounded by Boda and Panchagarh Sadar upazilas on the north, Birganj, Khansama and Nilphamari Sadar upazilas on the south, Domar upazila and West Bengal state of India on the east, Thakurgaon Sadar and Boda upazilas on the west.

== Demographics ==
Religions in Debiganj Upazila (2022)
| Religion | Percent |
| Islam | 75.59% |
| Hinduism | 24.17% |
| Other or not stated | 0.24% |

According to the 2022 Bangladeshi census, Debiganj Upazila had 64,550 households and a population of 267,466. 10.01% of the population were under 5 years of age. Debiganj had a literacy rate (age 7 and over) of 71.04%: 74.15% for males and 68.01% for females, and a sex ratio of 98.72 males for every 100 females. 34,438 (12.88%) lived in urban areas.

According to the 2011 Census of Bangladesh, Debiganj Upazila had 52,411 households and a population of 224,709. 55,235 (24.58%) were under 10 years of age. Debiganj had a literacy rate (age 7 and over) of 47.69%, compared to the national average of 51.8%, and a sex ratio of 986 females per 1000 males. 15,301 (6.81%) lived in urban areas.

As of the 1991 Bangladesh census, Debiganj has a population of 159,902. Males constitute 51.02% of the population, and females 48.98%. This Upazila's eighteen up population is 77660. Debiganj has an average literacy rate of 24.8% (7+ years), and the national average of 32.4% literate.

== Administration ==
UNO: Md . Shoriful Alom.

Debiganj Thana was formed in 1928 and it was turned into an upazila on 28 March 1983.

The Upazila is divided into ten union parishads: Chengthi Hazradanga, Chilahati, Dandopal, Debiduba, Debiganj, Pamuli, Shaldanga, Sonahar Mollikadaha, Sundardighi, and Tepriganj. The union parishads are subdivided into 108 mauzas and 101 villages.

== Education ==
Nripendra Narayan Government High School, founded in 1906, is a notable secondary school in the upazila. Debiganj Alodini Government Girls High School is a secondary government high school here.

It also has a reputed college named Debiganj College. Overall Debiganj has 68 govt and non-govt high schools and 10 colleges. Some of them are -

- Sonahar Girls High School
- Sonahar High School
- Khariza Sonahar High School
- Saldanga High School
- TZ High School
- Debigonj Girls' High School
- Debigonj Pailot High School.
