= Panchagarh Sadar Upazila =

Panchagarh Sadar Upazila পঞ্চগড় সদর উপজেলা
- Upazila
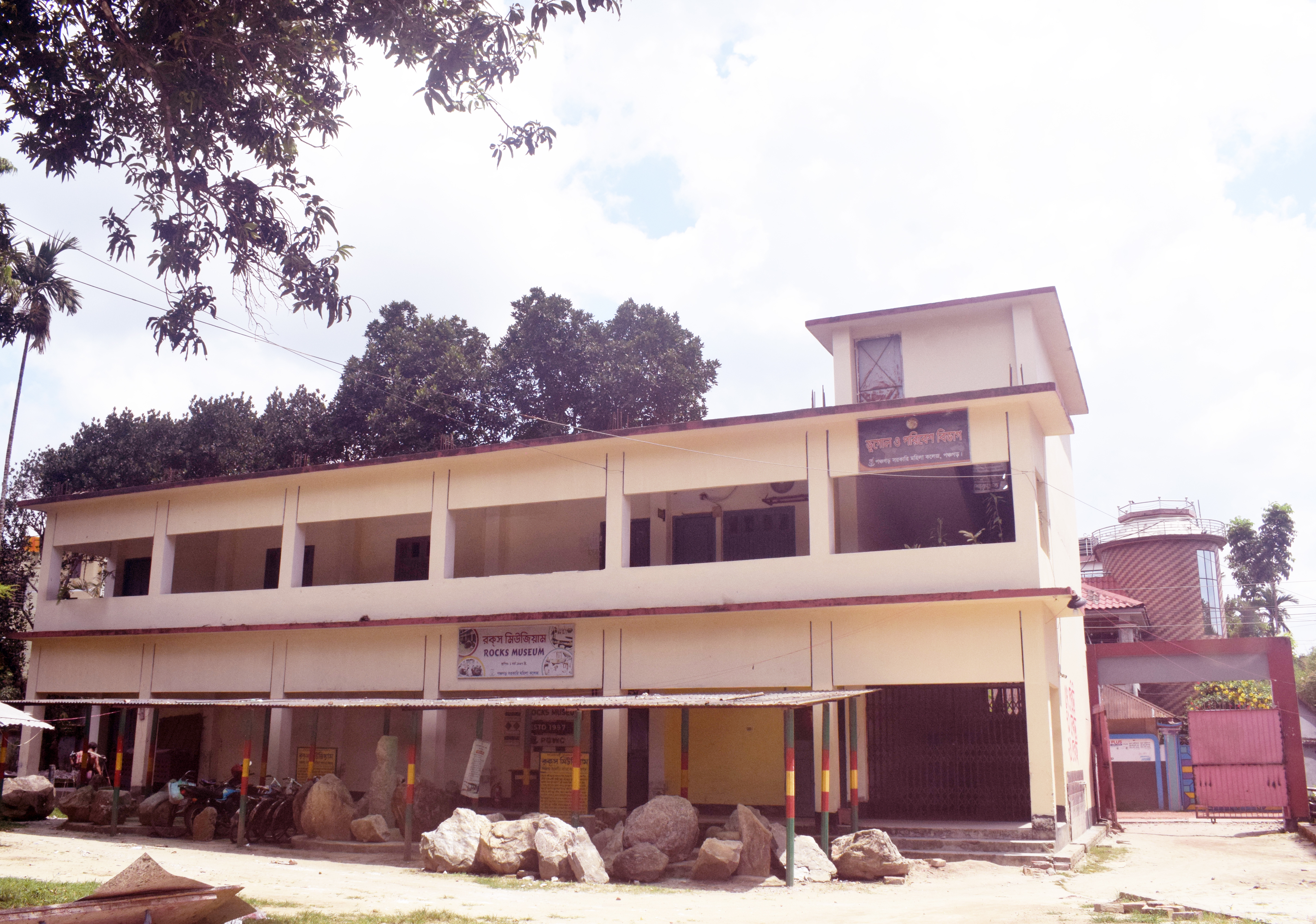
- Rocks Museum of Panchagarh

- Coordinates: 26°20.1′N 88°33.5′E
- Country: Bangladesh
- Division: Rangpur
- District: Panchagarh

Area
  - Total: 347.08 km^{2} (134.01 sq mi)

Population (2022)
  - Total: 335,366
  - Density: 966.25/km^{2} (2,502.6/sq mi)
- Time zone: UTC+6 (BST)
- Postal code: 5000
- Area code: 0568
- Website: Official Map of Panchagarh Sadar

Panchagarh Sadar Upazila mauza geocode map

Panchagarh Sadar Upazila (Bengali: পঞ্চগড় সদর উপজেলা) is an upazila of Panchagarh District in Rangpur Division, Bangladesh.

== Geography ==
Panchagarh Sadar is located at 26.3347°N 88.5583°E, north side of the district. It has 37232 households and total area 347.08 km^{2}.

It is bounded by West Bengal state of India on the north and east, Boda and Debiganj upazilas on the south, Atwari and Tentulia upazilas and West Bengal state of India on the west. The upazila has two enclaves; the Indian enclaves in the upazila are Garati and Singimari.

== Demographics ==
Religions in Panchagarh Sadar Upazila (2022)
Religion	Percent
Islam	94.04%
Hinduism	5.91%
Other or not stated	0.05%

According to the 2022 Bangladeshi census, Panchagarh Sadar Upazila had 77,784 households and a population of 335,366. 11.30% of the population were under 5 years of age. Panchagarh Sadar had a literacy rate (age 7 and over) of 75.59%: 77.97% for males and 73.20% for females, and a sex ratio of 100.93 males for every 100 females. 85,487 (25.49%) lived in urban areas.

According to the 2011 Census of Bangladesh, Panchagarh Sadar Upazila had 60,115 households and a population of 271,707. 65,736 (24.19%) were under 10 years of age. Panchagarh Sadar had a literacy rate (age 7 and over) of 53.19%, compared to the national average of 51.8%, and a sex ratio of 985 females per 1000 males. 46,038 (16.94%) lived in urban areas.

As of the 1991 Bangladesh census, Panchagarh Sadar has a population of 193,198. Males constitute 51.3% of the population, and females 48.7%. This upazila's eighteen-up population is 92,460. Panchagarh Sadar has an average literacy rate of 34.7% (7+ years), and the national average of 32.4% literate.

== Administration ==
UNO: Md. Jakir Hossen.

Panchagarh thana was established under Jalpaiguri district of West Bengal during British rule. It was under the Thakurgaon sub-division of Dinajpur district at the time of the partition of 1947 and had been a thana under Panchagarh sub-division since 1980. Panchagarh Thana was formed in 1909 and it was turned into an upazila in 1984 due to Chief Martial Law Administrator, Hussain Muhammad Ershad's decentralization programme.

Panchagarh Sadar Upazila is divided into Panchagarh Municipality and ten union parishads: Amarkhana, Chaklahat, Dhakkamara, Garinabari, Hafizabad, Haribhasa, Kamat Kajal Dighi, Magura, Panchagarh, and Satmara. The union parishads are subdivided into 83 mauzas and 195 villages.

Panchagarh Municipality is subdivided into 9 wards and 32 mahallas.

== See also ==
- Upazilas of Bangladesh
- Districts of Bangladesh
- Divisions of Bangladesh
- Administrative geography of Bangladesh
