= Panchagarh District =

District of Rangpur Division in Bangladesh

Panchagarh District পঞ্চগড় জেলা
- District of Bangladesh
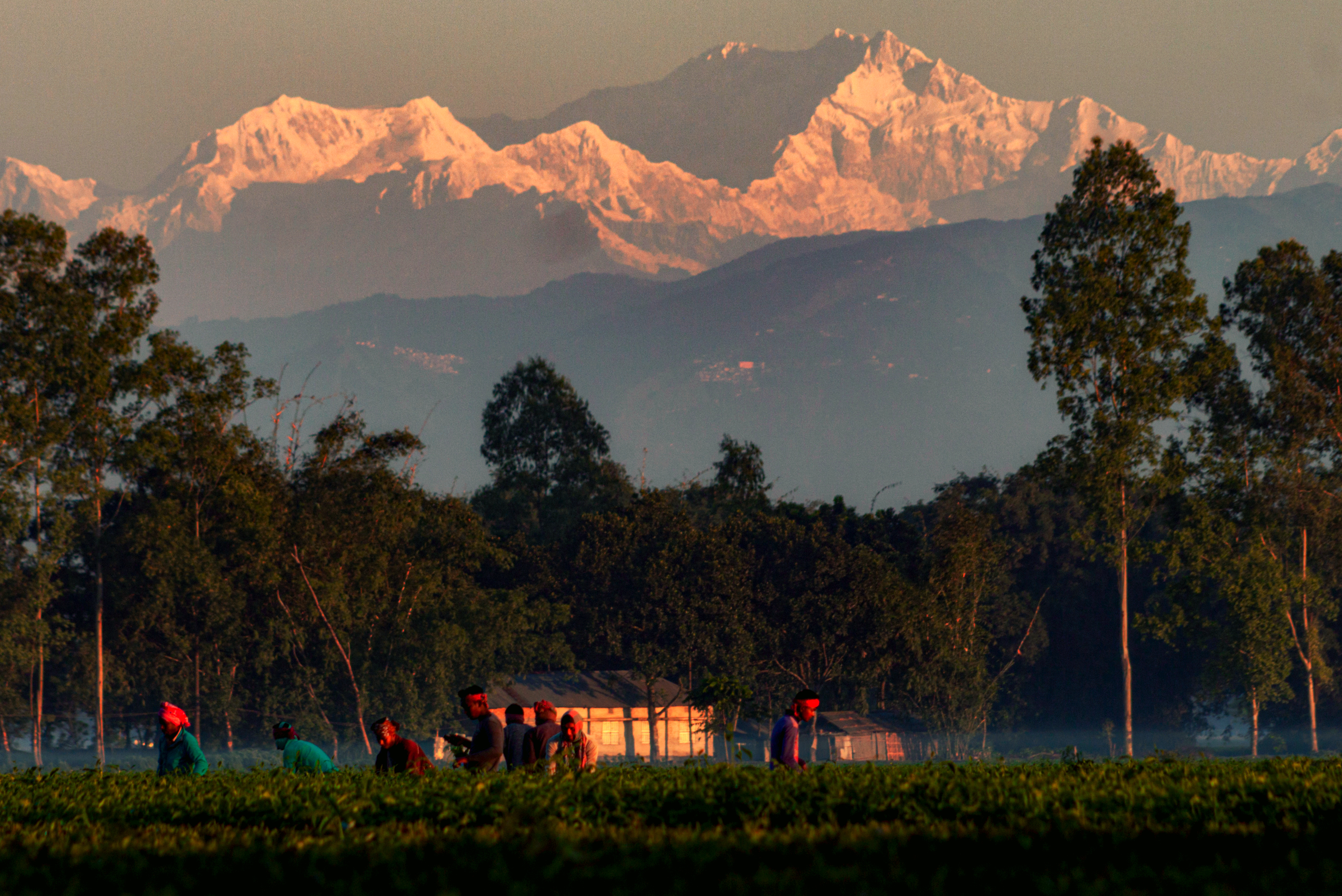
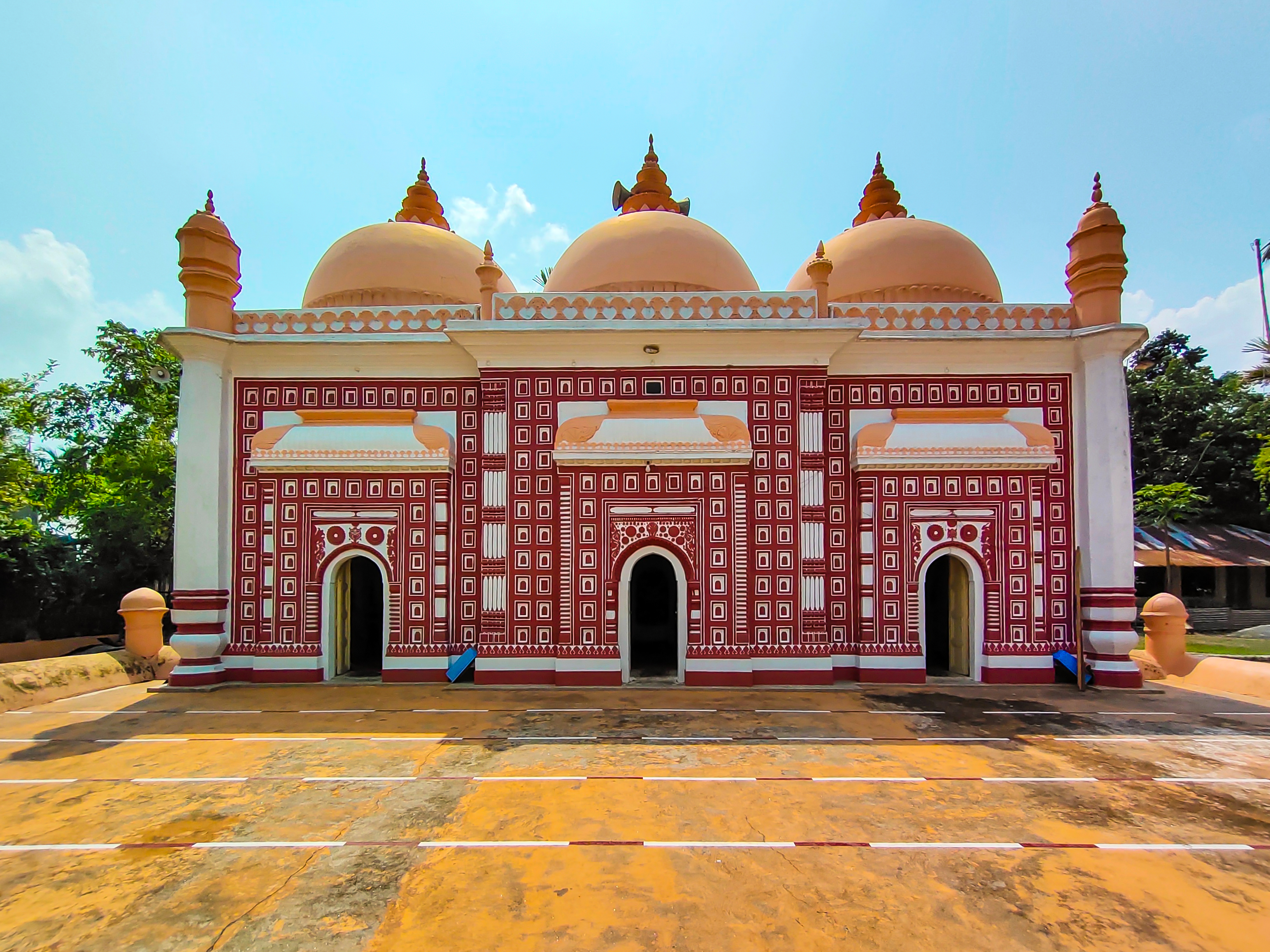
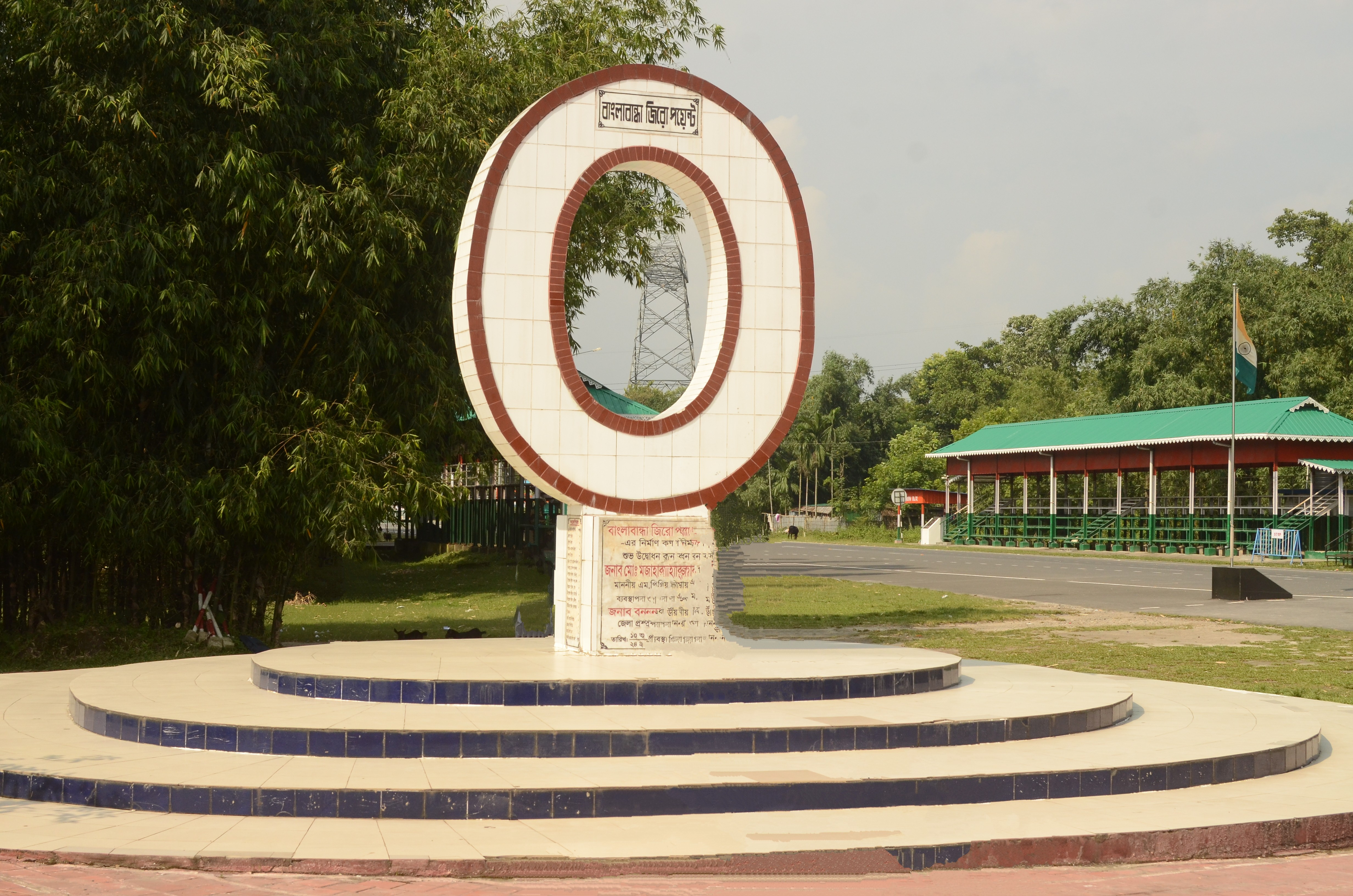
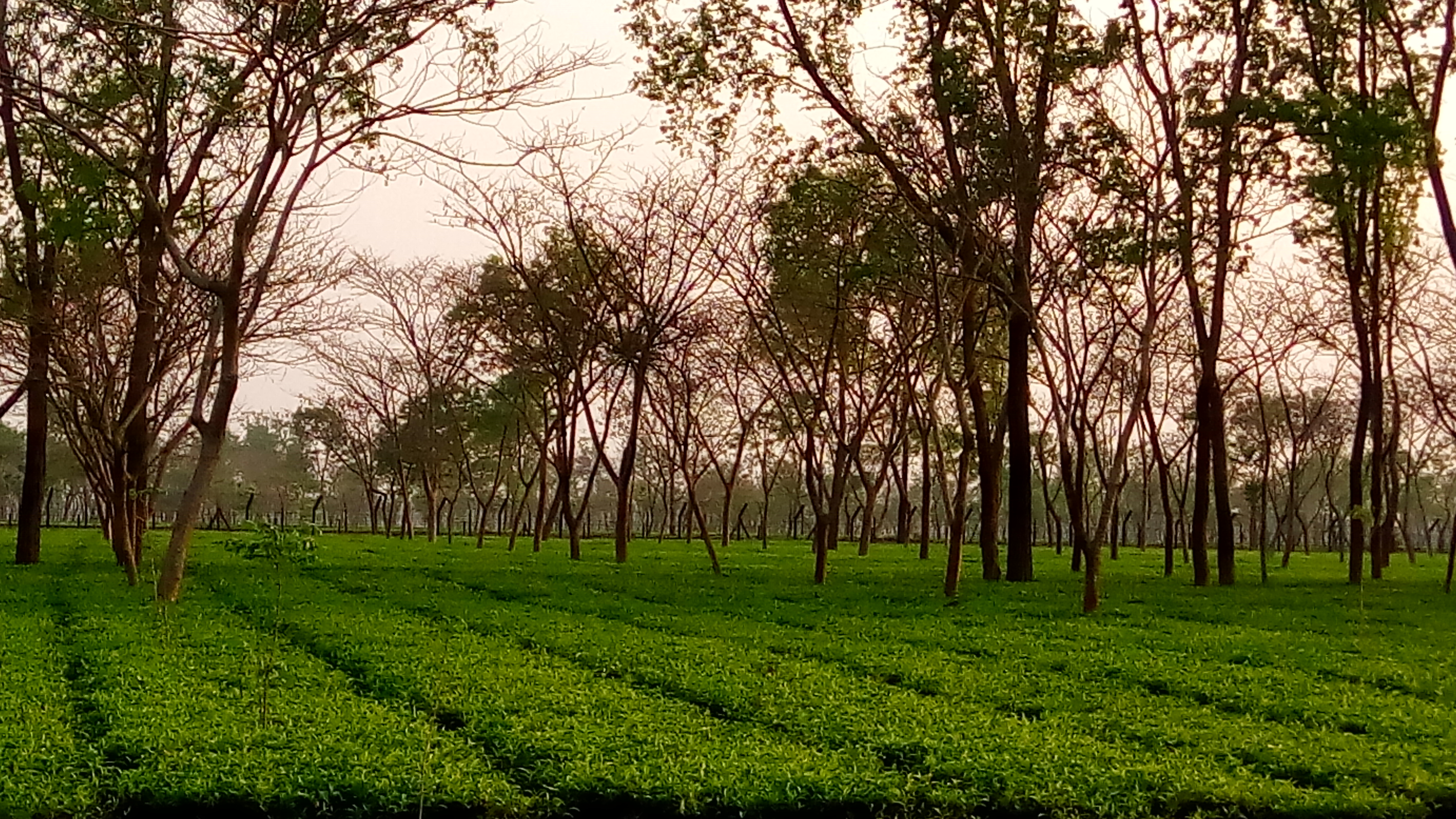
- Clockwise from top-left: Kangchenjunga Mountain from Tetulia, Banglabandha Zero Point, Tetulia Tea Garden and Mirzapur Shahi Mosque

- Location of Panchagarh District in Bangladesh
- Expandable map of Panchagarh District
- Coordinates: 26.2°N 88.34°E
- Country: Bangladesh
- Division: Rangpur Division
- Established: 1 February 1984
- Headquarters: Panchagarh

Government
  - Deputy Commissioner: Md Johirul Islam

Area
  - Total: 1,404.63 km^{2} (542.33 sq mi)

Population (2022)
  - Total: 1,179,843
  - Density: 839.967/km^{2} (2,175.50/sq mi)
- Time zone: UTC+06:00 (BST)
- Postal code: 5000
- Area code: 0568
- ISO 3166 code: BD-52
- HDI (2018): 0.614 medium · 7th of 21
- Constituencies: Panchagarh-1; Panchagarh-2
- Website: www.panchagarh.gov.bd

Panchagarh District (Bengali: পঞ্চগড় জেলা) is a district of the Rangpur Division in Northern Bangladesh. Panchagarh is the northernmost district of Bangladesh. It lies between 26º00' and 26º38' north latitudes and between 88º19' and 88º49' east longitudes. It was established as a district on 1 February 1984.

== Etymology ==
There are two main beliefs associated with the name of the district. The first is that Panchargarh was named after an area called Pancha Nagari in the kingdom of Pundu Nagar. The second is that it was named for the five forts (or garh) in the region. The forts were Bhitargarh, Hosaingarh, Mirgarh, Rajangarh, and Devengarh, hence the name Panchagarh, meaning 'five forts'.

== History ==
Pre-partition Jalpaiguri district with present-day border. Four out of five Upazilas of present-day Panchagarh were part of Jalpaiguri district before partition of Bengal in 1947.

During the regime of the British Raj, Panchagarh was part of the Jalpaiguri district of undivided Bengal. In 1911, Jalpaiguri was fully established as a thana. At that time, the headquarters of Jalpaiguri thana was situated in Jagdal upazila of the current Panchagarh district. The thana was relocated at the bank of Karatoya River in its current position for environmental and transportation benefits. After the Partition of India and Pakistan in 1947, Panchagarh was a thana under the Thakurgaon mahakuma in Dinajpur district. On 1 January 1980, it was established as a mahakuma consisting of five thanas named Tetulia, Panchagarh Sadar, Atwari, Boda and Debiganj. The first commissioner of Panchagarh was Sayed Abdur Rashid from 1 January 1980 to 31 December 1982. Later, it was established as a district on 1 February 1984. The first deputy commissioner of Panchagarh was A. S. M. Abdul Halim from 1 February 1984 to 16 June 1985.

== Geography ==
Geographically this land is part of the lower foothills of the Himalayas so comparatively this land is the highest in Bangladesh, lying 150 feet (46 m) above sea level. The soil composition is also distinct with rich sand and stones. The district is located in the extreme north of Bangladesh, and is bounded on three sides by the 288 km (179 mi) long Indian border, with the Darjeeling district on the north, Jalpaiguri and Cooch Behar districts on the northeast, Uttar Dinajpur on the west, Dinajpur and Thakurgaon districts on the south, and Nilphamari district on the east. It lies between 26º00' and 26º38' north latitudes and between 88º19' and 88º49' east longitudes.

Total area of the district is 1,404.62 square kilometres or 542.33 square miles. The district consists of five upazilas, 43 unions, 420 mauzas, 825 villages, two paurashavas, 18 wards and 64 mahallas. Its soil is sandy, alluvial and bears close affinity with the soil of the older Himalayan basin. In the northern part of the district there exists an underground layer of pebbles. Panchagarh has 16 rivers, amongst which are the Karatoya (Karatoa), Atrai, Teesta, Nagor, Mahananda, Tangon, Dahuk, Pathraj, Bhulli, Talma, Chawai, Kurum, Tirnoi, and Chilka. The border of this district was designed by Sir Cyril John Radcliffe in 1947. The length of the border in Panchagarh between Bangladesh and India is 286.87 km (178.25 mi).

== Demographics ==
Historical population
Year	Pop.	±% p.a.
1974	480,066	—
1981	578,218	+2.69%
1991	712,024	+2.10%
2001	836,196	+1.62%
2011	987,644	+1.68%
2022	1,179,843	+1.63%

According to the 2022 Census of Bangladesh, Panchagarh District had 281,627 households and a population of 1,179,843. The urban population was 189,848 (16.09%). Panchagarh District had a literacy rate of 73.66% for the population 7 years and above: 76.66% for males and 70.69% for females, and a sex ratio of 99.68 males per 100 females. The ethnic population is 2,011.

Religions in Panchagarh District (2022)
Religion	Percent
Islam	84.06%
Hinduism	15.68%
Other or not stated	0.26%

Religion in present-day Panchagarh District
Religion	1941 (Note: Tetulia, Panchagarh, Boda and Debiganj thanas of Jalpaiguri district and Atwari thana of Dinajpur district)		1981		1991		2001		2011		2022	
Religion	Pop.	%	Pop.	%	Pop.	%	Pop.	%	Pop.	%	Pop.	%
Hinduism	118,173	50.20%	113,988	19.71%	126,889	17.82%	142,350	17.02%	163,404	16.55%	184,951	15.68%
Islam	115,590	49.10%	460,812	79.70%	582,398	81.79%	690,893	82.62%	820,629	83.09%	991,764	84.06%
Others (Note: Including Jainism, Christianity, Buddhism, Zoroastrianism, Judaism, Ad-Dharmis, or not stated)	1,648	0.70%	3,418	0.59%	2,737	0.39%	2,953	0.36%	3,611	0.36%	3,128	0.26%
Total Population	235,411	100%	578,218	100%	712,024	100%	836,196	100%	987,644	100%	1,179,843	100%

Muslims make up 84.06% of the population while Hindus, mainly Rajbanshis, are 15.68% of the population. There is a population of 2,700 Christians, mainly in Atwari Upazila. Prior to Partition, Hindus made up a slight majority in what is now Panchagarh district.

== Economy ==
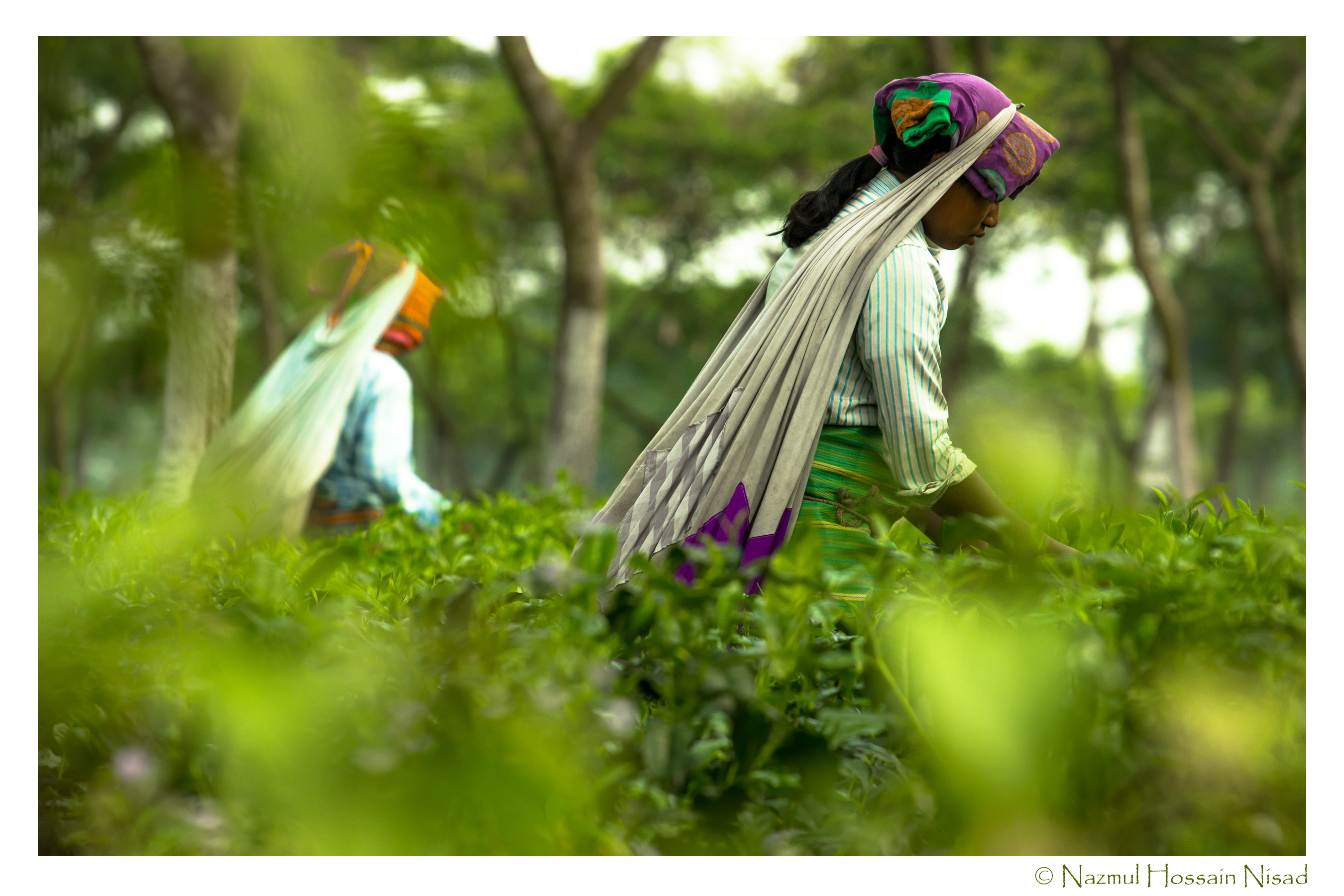
Tea Garden in Panchagarh © Nazmul Hossain Nisad

The local industry consists of tea, sugar, rice mills, ice factories, garment factories, oil milling, and saw milling.

Banglabandha land port is located on about 10 acres (40,000 m^{2}) of acquired land at the north-western tip of Bangladesh in Tetulia under Panchagarh district on the Bangladesh-India highway. The port is situated 60 km (37 mi) from Panchagarh Town. The place is of international character and used for Nepal transit traffic passing through a small corridor of India. It is about 22 metres (72 ft) away from the Bangladesh-Indian border.

Panchagarh is famous for its tea industry which plays a major role in the economics of this area. Presently, over 7,000 skilled and unskilled workers, mostly women, work in 246 tea gardens, including 18 big estates, 13 medium-size and 215 small-scale gardens set up on more than 1,815 acres (7.35 km^{2}) of land in Tetulia and the surrounding areas. Of them nearly 2,300 workers, mostly women, work alone at the giant Kazi & Kazi Tea Estate (KKTE) at Tetulia which has earned a reputation in both national and international markets by producing, processing and marketing Kazi & Kazi organic tea, also sold as Teatulia Organic Teas, and earning foreign exchange.

Industry for manufacturing SPC electric poles, established a plant (Gemcon Ltd.) on 35 acres in Panchagarh District. Here, all the products in the plant are manufactured by using indigenous raw materials. The factory has created direct or indirect job opportunities for more than 1500 people and helping the nation to alleviate poverty.

Gem Jute Limited was established in Panchagarh in 2003, with a corporate vision of improving the livelihood of the local population by providing employment and advancement opportunities as well as stimulating the local economy through direct and indirect economic activities. Gem Jute promotes sustainable development and support the environment by providing high-quality, organic, biodegradable products to the world market. Over 5000 people work at Gem Jute Limited.

Under Bangladesh Sugar and Food Industries Corporation (BSFIC), Panchagarh Sugar Mills Ltd. is the oldest industry in the district. Panchagarh Sugar Mills was set up by the government in 1965–69 at a cost of Tk.55.55 million. It is near the district headquarters of Panchagarh and is the northernmost sugar mill in Bangladesh. Machinery and equipment of the sugar mill were supplied by M/S. Stork Werkspoor of Holland. The sugar mill started its trial production in 1969–70. Since the independence of Bangladesh (until 2005), the sugar mill has produced 8,536 million tons of sugar per annum on average with an average sugar recovery rate of 8.10% from sugarcane.

== Points of interest ==
=== Atwari ===
Atwari, a popular tourist spot, has three domed mosques at Mirzapur, Chhaprajhar (Pahar Bhanga) and Sardarpara, which bear the relics of Mughal architecture and the remains of the Zamindar Bari of Aloakhoa. The Bara Awliyar Majar is another notable place of interest.

Atwari has the marks of Bangladesh War of Liberation of 1971. There are 2 mass graves, 1 twin grave and 1 martyr memorial monument.

=== Panchagarh Sadar ===
Maharaja Dighi (Pond) at Bhitargarh is a well-known tourist attraction in the Sadar Upazila. Bhitrar Shalmara is a notable lake. Shal forest of Bhitargarh and the government forest on the banks of the Chawai and Karatôya rivers are also quite famous.

During the War of Liberation in 1971, the guerrilla fighters demolished the bridge on the Chawai near the Amarkhana camp thereby obstructing the advance of the Pakistani army towards the north. In the initial stage of the war, Maqbul Darji and the Badi Howladar (EPR) were killed in an encounter with the Pakistani army, which lost eighteen of its soldiers.

The Shaheed Farooque Ahmad Memorial Monument at Dhakka-mara in Panchagarh town, as well as the grave of the martyr freedom fighter Sakimuddin at Jagdal-hat in front of the Baital Aman mosque, mark the War of Liberation.

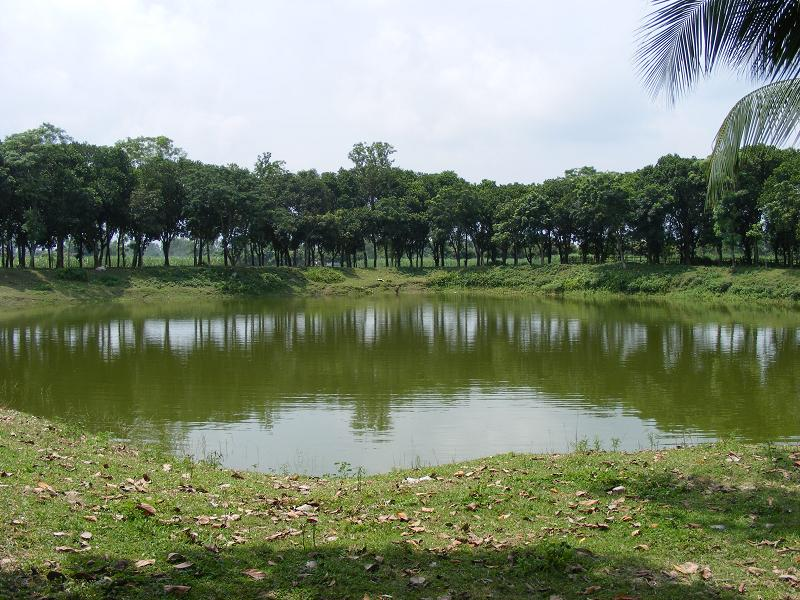
Pond of beside the 12 Auliar Mazar in Panchagarh

=== Debiganj ===
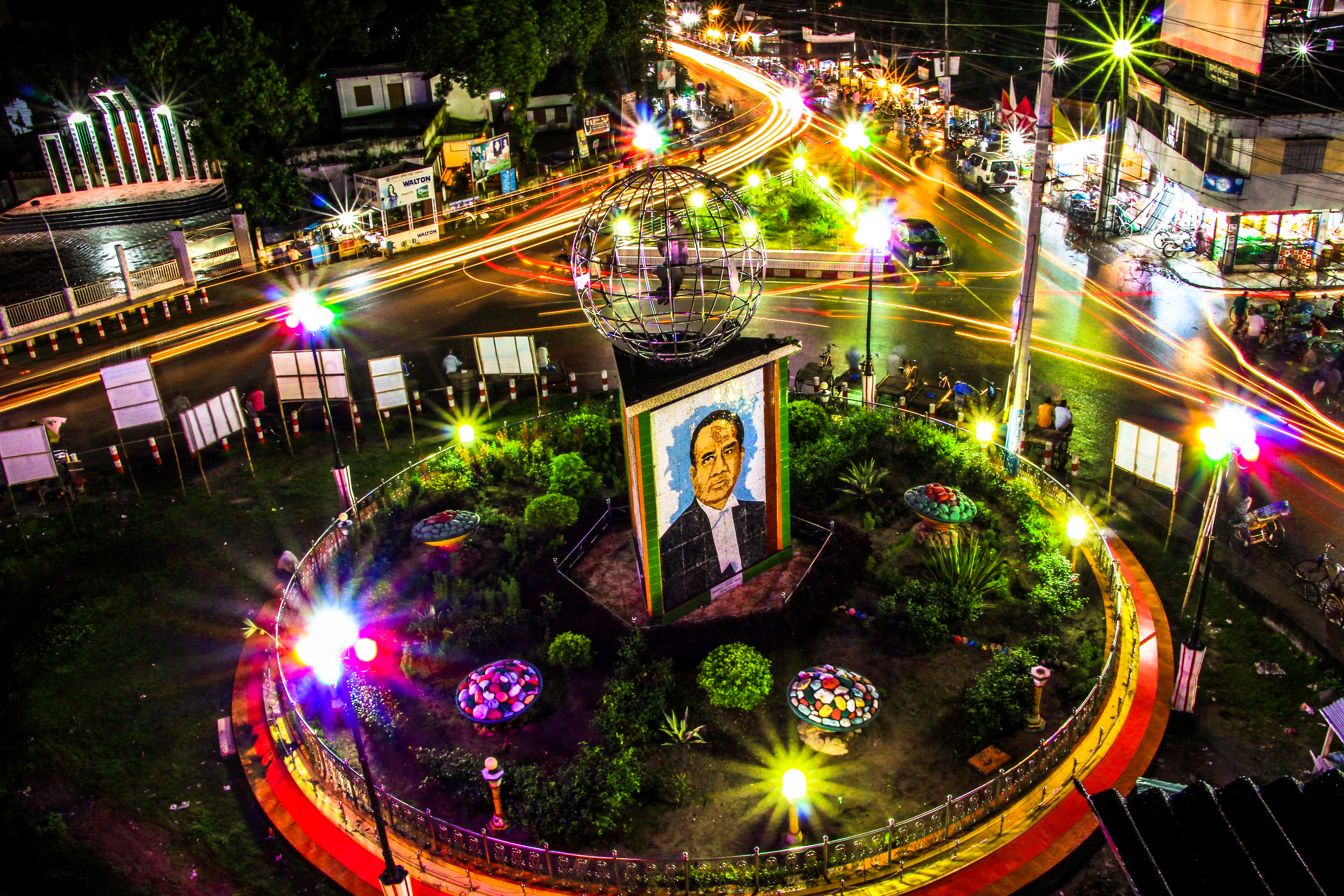
Sher-e-Bangla Park, Panchagarh © Nazmul Hossain Nisad

In Debiganj, the Revenue office building and the old residential house of the Raja of Cooch-Bihar are quite well-known. Jagabandhu Thakur-bari is another place of interest for tourists. Saldanga Gokulam Temple, which is notable for its Greek architecture, is located in Debiganj. The town has one dak bungalow (rest house).

Tetulia upzela : Tetulia dak bungalow, Banglabadha zeropoint, Rowsonpur mini park and tea garden

== Administration ==
Panchagarh District upazila geocode map

Panchagarh has three Municipalities:

- Panchagarh
- Boda
- Debiganj

Panchagarh has five upazilas:

Upazila	Area (km^{2})	Population (2011)	Union
Panchagarh Sadar	347.09	271707	10
Debiganj	309.02	224709	10
Boda	349.47	232124	10
Atwari	209.93	133650	6
Tetulia	189.10	125454	7

== Transport ==
Bicycle, rickshaw, and motorcycle are the main modes of transport for local people. Regular buses connect the district to neighbouring districts and subdivisions. The road distance from Dhaka (capital city of Bangladesh) to Panchagarh is 475 kilometres (295 mi). Road transportation between Dhaka and Panchagarh is a private sector affair, operating predominantly in domestic routes. On 10 November 2018, direct train service from Dhaka to Panchagarh was inaugurated. The railway distance from Dhaka to Panchagarh is 639 kilometres (397 mi), which is the longest distance travelled by any train in the country. There is no direct air connection from Dhaka to Panchagarh.

== Education ==
The district's literacy rate is 51.08%, among which male and female literacy rates are 55.02% and 48.03% respectively. There are 313 primary schools, 65 kindergartens, 79 NGO schools, four government secondary schools, 268 non-government secondary schools, two government colleges, 25 non-government colleges, 94 madrasas, and 13 technical and vocational institutions in the district.

Notable schools and colleges of the districts are:

- Bishnu Prasad Government High School
- Panchagarh Government Girls' High School
- Nripendra Narayan Government High School
- Debiganj Alodini Government Girls High School
- Moqbular Rahman Government College
- Panchagarh Government Women's College

== Notable residents ==
- Muhammad Jamiruddin Sarkar, former speaker, Jatiyo Sangshad
- Mirza Ghulam Hafiz, former Minister of Law and Justice, Jatiyo Sangshad
- Sirajul Islam, Member of Parliament, Jatiyo Sangshad
- Mohammad Sultan, language movement activist in 1952
- Mohammad Farhad, Captain of guerilla force in the 1971 independence war and member of the parliament of national parliament
- Abdur Rahman, film actor
- Gamiruddin Pradhan, Bangladeshi lawyer
- Shoriful Islam, Bangladeshi cricketer
- Md. Nurul Islam Sujon, Railway Minister of Bangladesh
- Fariha Trisna, Bangladeshi Woman cricketer
- Sarjis Alam, Bangladeshi Politician, chief organiser of National Citizen Party

== See also ==
- Upazilas of Bangladesh
- Districts of Bangladesh
- Divisions of Bangladesh
- Upazila
- Thana
