= Sirajul Islam (Panchagarh politician) =

Bangladeshi politician

- সিরাজুল ইসলাম

Member of the Bangladesh Parliament for Panchagarh-1
- In office 1986–1988
- Succeeded by: Abdul Kuddus

Member of Parliament for Dinajpur-2
- In office 1973–1982
- Succeeded by: Satish Chandra Roy

Member of East Pakistan Provincial Assembly
- In office 1970–1970
- Constituency: Dinajpur-2

Personal details
- Born: 1944 Maidandighi, Boda, Jalpaiguri district, Bengal Presidency
- Died: 2 June 1996 (aged 51–52) Shaheed Suhrawardy Medical College Hospital, Bangladesh
- Party: Awami League
- Relatives: Nurul Islam Sujan (brother)

Sirajul Islam (1944 – 2 June 1996) was an Awami League politician in Bangladesh and a member of parliament for Dinajpur-2 and Panchagarh-1.

== Early life ==
Islam was born in 1944 to a Bengali family in the village of Mahajan Para in Maidandighi Union, Boda, Jalpaiguri district, Bengal Presidency (now in Panchagarh District, Bangladesh). He was the fifth among the seven daughters and two sons of Imaz Uddin Ahmed and Kabijan Nesa. His brother, Nurul Islam Sujan, was an MP for Panchagarh-2 and the former Rail Minister.

== Career ==
Islam was elected to parliament from Dinajpur-2 as an Awami League candidate in 1973 and 1979. He was elected to parliament from Panchagarh-1 as an Awami League candidate in 1986.

== Legacy ==
Bir Muktijoddha Sirajul Islam Stadium and Bir Muktijoddha Sirajul Islam Railway Station (the main railway station of Panchagarh) were named after him.
