= Farhad Hossain Azad =

Bangladeshi politician

- ফরহাদ হোসেন আজাদ
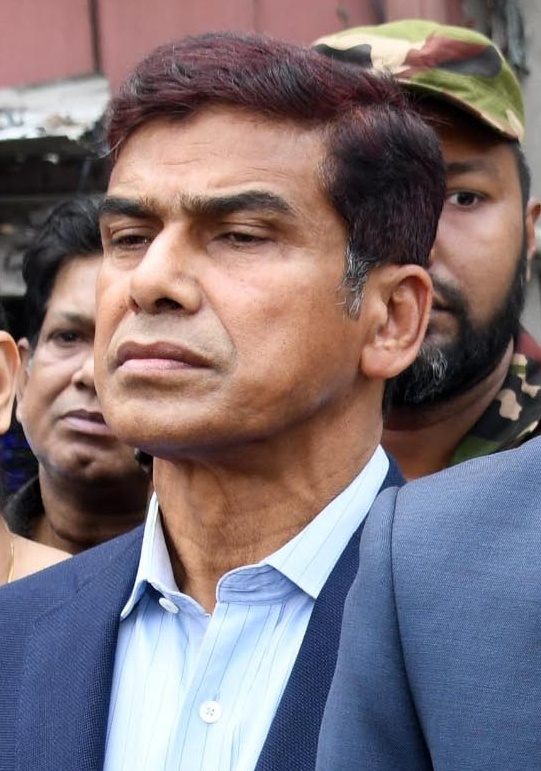
- Azad in 2026

Minister of State for Water Resources
- Incumbent
- Assumed office 17 February 2026
- Prime Minister: Tarique Rahman
- Preceded by: Zaheed Farooque

Member of Parliament
- Incumbent
- Assumed office 17 February 2026
- Preceded by: Nurul Islam Sujan
- Constituency: Panchagarh-2

Personal details
- Born: 12 March 1966 (age 60) Boda, East Pakistan, Pakistan (now Bangladesh)
- Party: Bangladesh Nationalist Party
- Spouse: Ashrafi Azad
- Parents: Tozammel Hossain (father); Ferdousi Begum (mother)
- Education: University of Dhaka

Farhad Hossain Azad (born 12 March 1966) is a Bangladeshi politician. He the incumbent Jatiya Sangsad member representing the Panchagarh-2 constituency and the incumbent state minister of water resources since February 2026. He is a member of the Bangladesh Nationalist Party (BNP). He is also a state minister in the Tarique ministry.

== Early life and education ==
Azad was born in Menagram, a village in Panchpir Union of Boda Upazila in the Panchagarh District, Bangladesh (then part of Dinajpur District, Bangladesh, East Pakistan). He completed his bachelor's degree in political science from the University of Dhaka. He later went abroad for higher studies and gained specialization in international relations and development economics.

== Controversy ==
In July 2026, intimate photographs and videos purportedly involving Farhad Hossain Azad circulated on social media. Several news outlets reported claims that the material was fake or had been created using artificial intelligence (AI). Such claims or allegations were reported by Kalbela, Kaler Kantho, RisingBD.com, RTV and Jagonews24.com. In contrast, The Dissent, a fact-checking and media-watch platform, reported in an investigative article that it found no evidence that the circulated photographs and videos had been generated using AI. The report said it examined the content using multiple AI-detection tools and reviewed related material, questioning the accuracy of earlier media reports that had described the material as AI-generated.
