= Nurul Islam Sujon =

Bangladeshi politician

Md. Nurul Islam
- মোঃ নূরুল ইসলাম
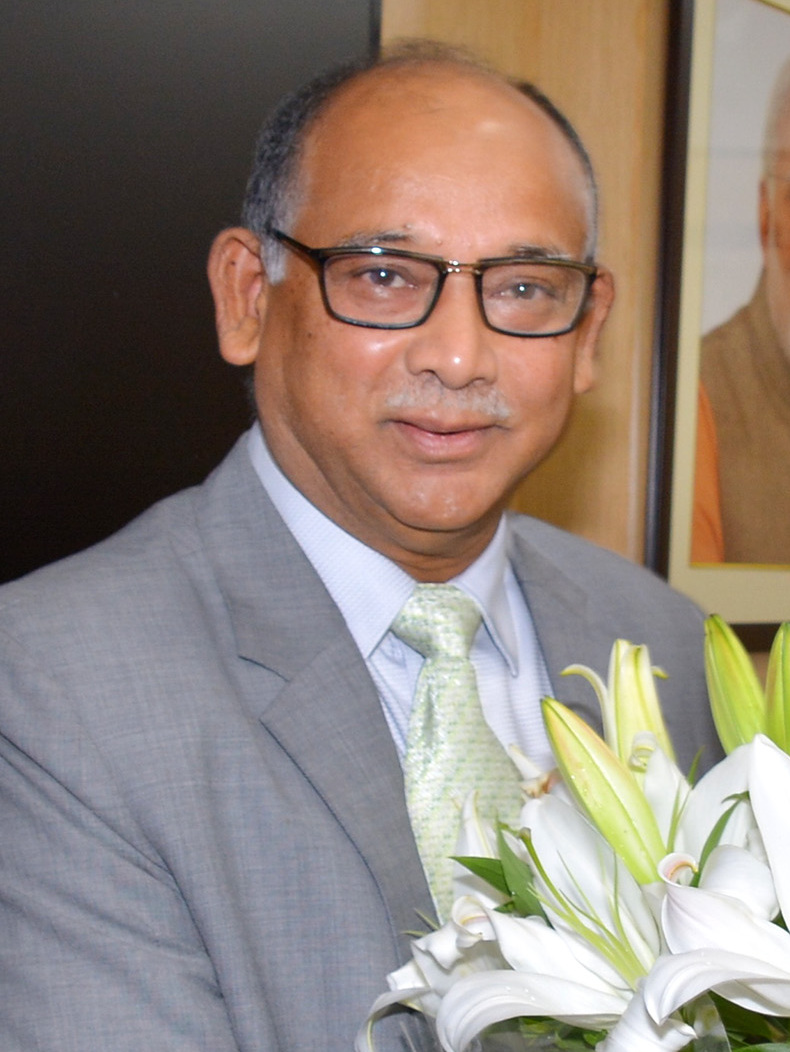
- Sujon in New Delhi (2019)

Minister of Railways
- In office 7 January 2019 – 10 January 2024
- Prime Minister: Sheikh Hasina
- Preceded by: Mujibul Haque Mujib
- Succeeded by: Zillul Hakim

Member of Parliament
- In office 25 January 2009 – 6 August 2024
- Preceded by: Mozahar Hossain
- Succeeded by: Vacant
- Constituency: Panchagarh-2

Personal details
- Born: 5 January 1956 (age 70) Boda, Panchagarh, East Bengal, Pakistan
- Party: Bangladesh Awami League
- Spouses: Nilufar Jahan (died 2018); Shammi Akter Moni (m. 2021)
- Education: University of Dhaka

Md. Nurul Islam (born 5 January 1956) is a Bangladesh Awami League politician and Jatiya Sangsad member representing the Panchagarh-2 constituency since 2009. He served as minister of railways during 2019-2023.

== Early life ==
Nurul Islam Sujon was born on 5 January 1956 in Mahajanpara, Maidandighi of Boda Upazila in Panchagarh District, then part of East Pakistan (now Bangladesh). He is the son of Imaz Uddin Ahmed and Kabijan Nesa. He is the youngest among six siblings, with one elder brother and five sisters. His elder brother, Sirajul Islam, was a freedom fighter and a former Member of Parliament representing Panchagarh.

Sujon completed his primary education at Moydan Dighi Government Primary School. He passed the Secondary School Certificate (SSC) examination from Moydan Dighi B.L. High School and the Higher Secondary Certificate (HSC) examination from Thakurgaon Government College.

He obtained a Bachelor of Science (Honours) degree in Zoology from University of Dhaka in 1978, followed by a Master of Science degree in the same discipline in 1979. He later earned an LL.B. degree in 1983.

== Career ==
Sujon was elected to parliament from Panchagarh-2 on 5 January 2014 as a Bangladesh Awami League candidate. He inaugurated Kalidhaho Bridge on 28 August 2015.

Sujon was arrested in Shyamoli by the Police on 16 September 2024, after the Awami League parliament was dissolved on 6 August 2024.

== Personal life ==
Sujon's first wife, Nilufar Jahan, died in 2018. Together they had three children. He then married Shammi Akter Moni in June 2021.
