= Panchagarh-1 =

Constituency of Bangladesh's Jatiya Sangsad

Coordinates: 26.33°N 88.56°E

- Constituency for the Jatiya Sangsad
- District: Panchagarh District
- Division: Rangpur Division
- Electorate: 463,700 (2026)

Current constituency
- Created: 1984
- Party: Bangladesh Nationalist Party
- Member: Muhammad Nawshad Zamir
- Panchagarh-2 →

Panchagarh-1 is a constituency represented in the Jatiya Sangsad (National Parliament) of Bangladesh since 2026 by Muhammad Nawshad Zamir of the Bangladesh Nationalist Party.

== Boundaries ==
The constituency encompasses Panchagarh Sadar and Tetulia upazilas and all but two parts of Atwari Upazila: Boda Municipality wards 8 and 9.

== History ==
The constituency was created in 1984 from the Dinajpur-2 constituency when the former Dinajpur District was split into three districts: Panchagarh, Thakurgaon, and Dinajpur.

As of 2008, the constituency encompassed Atwari, Panchagarh Sadar, and Tetulia upazilas.

Boda Municipality lies mostly in Boda Upazila, but its two wards southwest of the Pathraj River, 8 and 9, are in Atwari Upazila. Ahead of the 2026 general election, the Election Commission reduced the boundaries of the constituency by moving these two wards from Panchagarh-1 to Panchagarh-2.

== Members of Parliament ==
Election	Member	Party
1986	Sirajul Islam	Awami League
1988	Abdul Kuddus	Jatiya Party
1991	Mirza Ghulam Hafiz	Bangladesh Nationalist Party
Feb 1996	Mirza Ghulam Hafiz	Bangladesh Nationalist Party
Jun 1996	Jamiruddin Sarkar	Bangladesh Nationalist Party
2001	Jamiruddin Sarkar	Bangladesh Nationalist Party
2008	Mazharul Haque Prodhan	Awami League
2014	Nazmul Haque Prodhan	Jatiya Samajtantrik Dal
2018	Mazharul Haque Prodhan	Awami League
2024	Naimuzzaman Bhuiyan	Awami League
2026	Muhammad Nawshad Zamir	Bangladesh Nationalist Party

== Elections ==
=== Elections in the 2020s ===
General Election 2026: Panchagarh-1
Party	Candidate	Votes	%	±%
BNP	Muhammad Nawshad Zamir	176,169	50.3	N/A
NCP	Sarjis Alam	168,049	48.0	N/A
BJSD	Nazmul Haque Prodhan	3,009	0.9	N/A
BSP	Abdul Wadud Badsah	1,018	0.3	−0.4
GOP	Md. Mahfuzar Rahman	836	0.2	N/A
Labour	Md. Ferdous Alam	683	0.2	N/A
BNF	Serajul Islam	261	0.1	−0.7
Majority		8,120	2.3	−33.8
Turnout		350,025	75.5	+32.7
Registered electors		463,700		
BNP gain from AL				

General Election 2024: Panchagarh-1
Party	Candidate	Votes	%	±%
AL	Naimuzzaman Bhuiyan	124,742	66.7	+11.6
Independent	Anwar Sadat	57,210	30.6	N/A
BNF	Serajul Islam	1,481	0.8	N/A
NPP	Moshiur Rahman	1,399	0.7	+0.7
BSP	Abdul Wadud Badsah	1371	0.7	N/A
BSM	Abdul Majid	743	0.4	N/A
Majority		67,532	36.1	+23.0
Turnout		186,946	42.8	−40.4
Registered electors		436,923		
AL hold				

=== Elections in the 2010s ===
General Election 2018: Panchagarh-1
Party	Candidate	Votes	%	±%
AL	Mazharul Haque Prodhan	173,888	55.1	N/A
BNP	Nawshad Zamir	132,539	42.0	N/A
IAB	Mohammed Abdullah	3,453	1.1	N/A
Zaker Party	Sumon Rana	3,399	1.1	N/A
National Democratic Party	Rashed Prodhan	1,412	0.4	N/A
JP(E)	Abu Salek	729	0.2	−44.9
NPP	Habibur Rahman	132	0.0	N/A
Majority		41,349	13.1	+3.3
Turnout		315,552	83.2	+57.7
Registered electors		379,207		
AL gain from JSD				

General Election 2014: Panchagarh-1
Party	Candidate	Votes	%	±%
JSD	Nazmul Haque Prodhan	46,155	54.9	N/A
JP(E)	Abu Salek	37,908	45.1	N/A
Majority		8,247	9.8	−8.5
Turnout		84,063	25.5	−66.2
Registered electors		329,096		
JSD gain from AL				

=== Elections in the 2000s ===
General Election 2008: Panchagarh-1
Party	Candidate	Votes	%	±%
AL	Mazharul Haque Prodhan	156,550	58.7	+24.4
BNP	Muhammad Jamiruddin Sircar	107,726	40.4	+0.5
PDP	Delowar Hossain	1,251	0.5	N/A
IAB	Md. Shahjahan	883	0.3	N/A
CPB	Safiur Rahman	402	0.2	N/A
Majority		48,824	18.3	+12.7
Turnout		266,812	91.7	+6.4
Registered electors		291,095		
AL gain from BNP				

General Election 2001: Panchagarh-1
Party	Candidate	Votes	%	±%
BNP	Muhammad Jamiruddin Sircar	81,702	39.9	+4.5
AL	Md. Nurul Islam	70,164	34.3	+4.7
IJOF	Shafiul Alam Prodhan	50,829	24.8	N/A
Independent	Md. Khaja Nazimuddin	1,159	0.6	N/A
Gano Forum	Md. Rezael Islam	486	0.2	N/A
Independent	Muhammad Ali	478	0.2	−0.2
Majority		11,538	5.6	−0.2
Turnout		204,818	85.3	+4.4
Registered electors		240,073		
BNP hold				

=== Elections in the 1990s ===
General Election June 1996: Panchagarh-1
Party	Candidate	Votes	%	±%
BNP	Muhammad Jamiruddin Sircar	57,433	35.4	−4.4
AL	Md. Nurul Islam	48,012	29.6	−1.9
JP(E)	Shafiul Alam Prodhan	38,085	23.5	+14.2
Jamaat	Md. Abdul Khaleq	16,356	10.1	N/A
Zaker Party	Md. Jamer Ali	1,214	0.7	−1.1
Independent	Muhammad Ali	683	0.4	N/A
FP	Md. Khaja Nazimuddin Joarder	378	0.2	N/A
Majority		9,421	5.8	−2.4
Turnout		162,161	80.9	+19.5
Registered electors		200,457		
BNP hold				

General Election 1991: Panchagarh-1
Party	Candidate	Votes	%	±%
BNP	Mirza Ghulam Hafiz	48,678	39.8	
AL	Sirajul Islam	38,604	31.5	
NDP	Shafiul Alam Prodhan	18,178	14.9	
JP(E)	Abdul Kuddus	11,344	9.3	
Zaker Party	Md. Jamer Ali	2,160	1.8	
JSD	Nazmul Haque Prodhan	1,839	1.5	
IOJ	Md. Shahjahan	800	0.7	
Jatiya Samajtantrik Dal-JSD	Azizar Rahman	494	0.4	
BAKSAL	Md. AKM Samsuddoha	265	0.2	
Majority		10,074	8.2	
Turnout		122,362	61.4	
Registered electors		199,181		
BNP gain from JP(E)				
