= Mirza Ghulam Hafiz =

Bangladeshi politician

- মির্জা গোলাম হাফিজ

4th Speaker of the Jatiya Sangsad
- In office 2 April 1979 – 23 March 1982
- Deputy: Sultan Ahmed
- Preceded by: Abdul Malek Ukil
- Succeeded by: Shamsul Huda Chowdhury

Minister of Law, Justice and Parliamentary Affairs
- In office 20 March 1991 – 30 March 1996
- Prime Minister: Khaleda Zia
- Preceded by: M A Khaleq
- Succeeded by: Syed Ishtiaq Ahmed

Member of Parliament
- In office 1 April 1991 – 24 November 1995
- Preceded by: Abdul Kuddus
- Succeeded by: Muhammad Jamiruddin Sircar
- Constituency: Panchagarh-1
- In office 18 February 1979 – 24 March 1982
- Preceded by: Shamim Misir
- Succeeded by: Kamal Ahmed Majumder
- Constituency: Dhaka-15

Personal details
- Born: 2 January 1920 Mirzapur, Panchagarh, Bengal Presidency, British India
- Died: 20 December 2000 (aged 80) Dhaka, Bangladesh
- Party: Bangladesh Nationalist Party
- Relations: Mirza Ruhul Amin (Brother); Mirza Fakhrul Islam (Nephew)
- Parent: Mirza Azimuddin Sarkar (father)
- Education: University of Dhaka; University of Calcutta

Mirza Ghulam Hafiz (2 January 1920 – 20 December 2000) was a Bangladeshi lawyer, statesman, politician, and philanthropist.

== Early life and education ==
Hafiz was born to Mirza Azimuddin Sarkar on 2 January 1920 in Panchagarh District, East Bengal, British Raj. He obtained master's degree in economics in 1941 from University of Calcutta and a bachelor's of law degree in 1948 from the University of Dhaka.

== Career ==
Hafiz was an active organizer of the Language Movement on two separate occasions—in 1952 and again in 1954—and was jailed both times. In 1954, he was elected to the provincial assembly in Bengal as a representative of the Panchagarh district as a candidate of the United Front. He provided legal support to the defence team in the Agartala Conspiracy Case.

Mirza Hafiz was one of the founding members of the 33 member Committee for Civil Liberties and Legal Aid, which was established in March 1974 to protect the opposition politicians and members of civil society who were facing government persecution.

In 1979, Hafiz was elected to the new parliament of Bangladesh and was appointed the Minister of Land Management. From 1978 to 1982, he served as the Speaker of the Jatiya Sangsad until the coup that assassinated the President, Ziaur Rahman. After the demolition of the autocratic government of Hossain Mohammad Ershad, he was reelected to the parliament in 1991. Under the BNP, he was appointed the Minister of Law and Justice. He retired from politics in 1995.

== Death ==
Hafiz died on 20 December 2000, at the age of 80.
