= Najmul Haque (disambiguation) =

Najmul Haque may refer to:

- Sheikh Najmul Haque
- Nazmul Huq
- Nazmul Haque Prodhan
- Nazmul Hoque Sarkar
- Nazmul Haque Bappy
- Syed Nazmul Haque
- Mohammad Nazmul Haque
