= Nagar Kumari =

Neighborhood in Boda, Bangladesh

Nagar Kumari নগর কুমারী
- Neighborhood
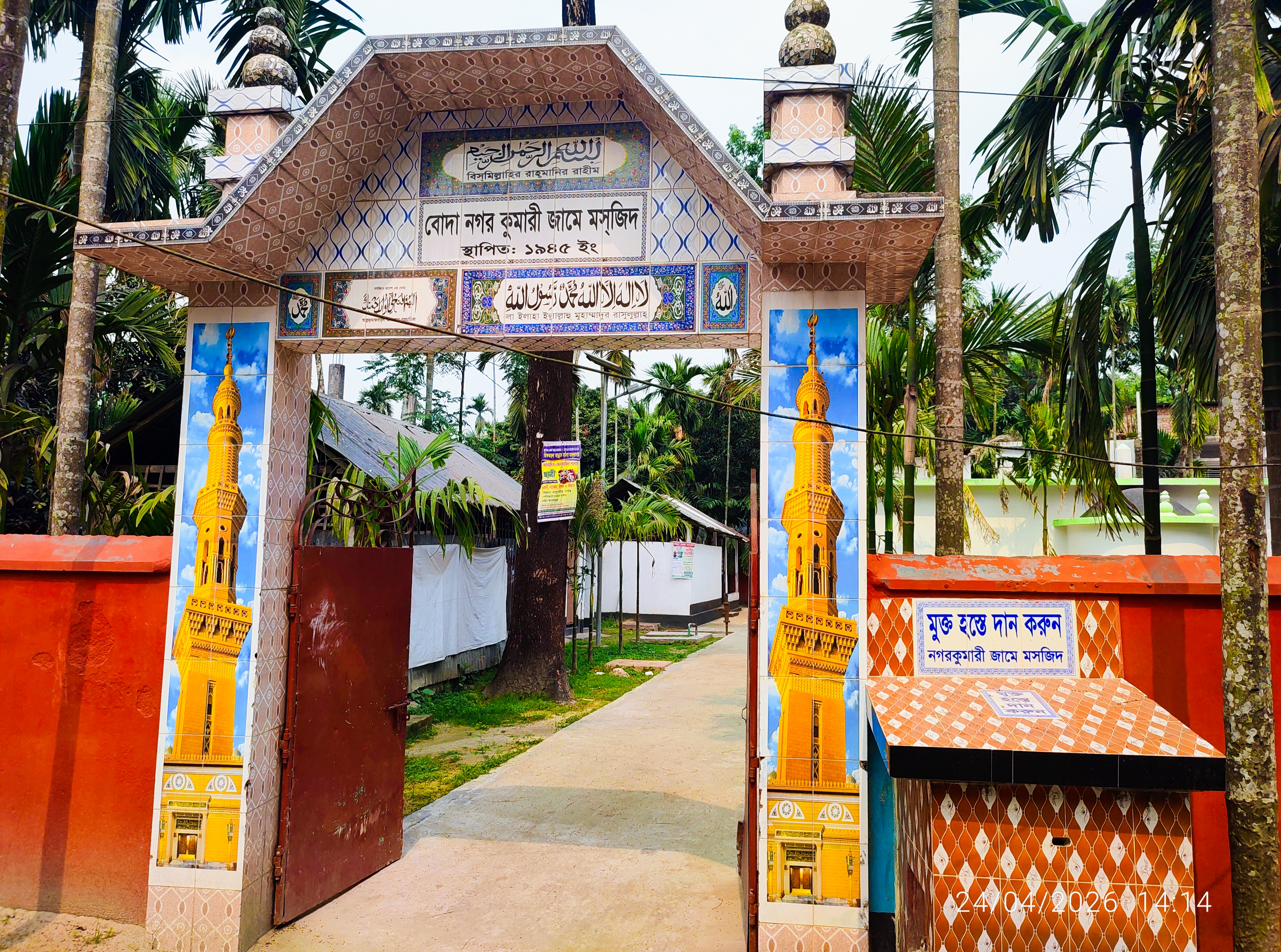
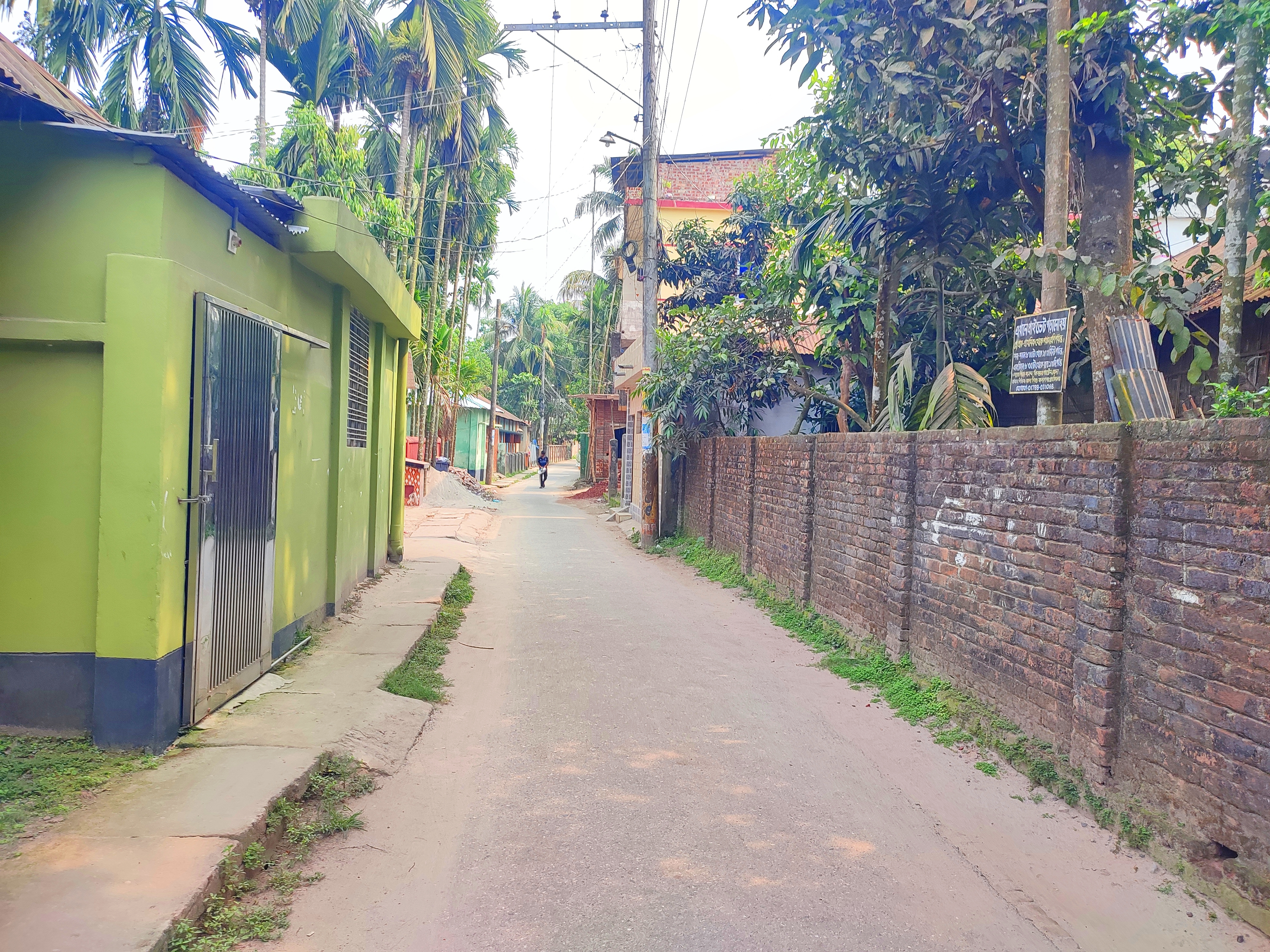
- Nagar Kumari Jame Mosque Nagar Kumari Road

- Location in Bangladesh
- Coordinates: 26.2010°N 88.5568°E
- Country: Bangladesh
- Division: Rangpur
- District: Panchagarh
- Upazila: Boda
- Municipality: Boda

Government
  - Type: Municipality
  - Body: Boda Municipality

Population (2011)
  - Total: 1,070
- Time zone: UTC+6 (Bangladesh Time)
- Post Code: 5010

Nagar Kumari (Bengali: নগর কুমারী) is a mahallah (neighborhood) located in Boda Municipality, under Boda Upazila of Panchagarh District in Rangpur Division, Bangladesh.

== History ==
According to a published account on the history of Boda, the present-day area of Nagar Kumari is traditionally regarded as the historic urban centre of Boda. The account states that during the survey of northern Bengal conducted by Dr. Francis Buchanan-Hamilton in 1809, the settlement was known as Kumari Kort or Nagar Kumari and served as a residential centre for government officials, police personnel and employees of the Maharaja of Cooch Behar, comprising about 200 households.

== Demographics ==
According to the 2011 Population and Housing Census of Bangladesh, Nagar Kumari had a total population of 1,070 living in 299 households. The neighbourhood covered an area of approximately 299 acres (121 ha) and extended across parts of Wards 3, 4 and 6 of Boda Municipality.

== Infrastructure ==
The area contains several local landmarks and public service infrastructure:

- Nagar Kumari Hat Bazar, a government-approved marketplace managed by the local municipality for daily commerce.
- Nagar Kumari Government Primary School, a state-run school providing educational services to the community.
- Pathraj Government College, Boda, a major educational institution of Boda Upazila, is situated on the edge of the Nagar Kumari area.

== See also ==
- Boda, Bangladesh
- Boda Upazila
- Panchagarh District
- List of villages in Bangladesh
