= Khalid Mahmud Chowdhury =

Bangladeshi politician

- খালিদ মাহমুদ চৌধুরী
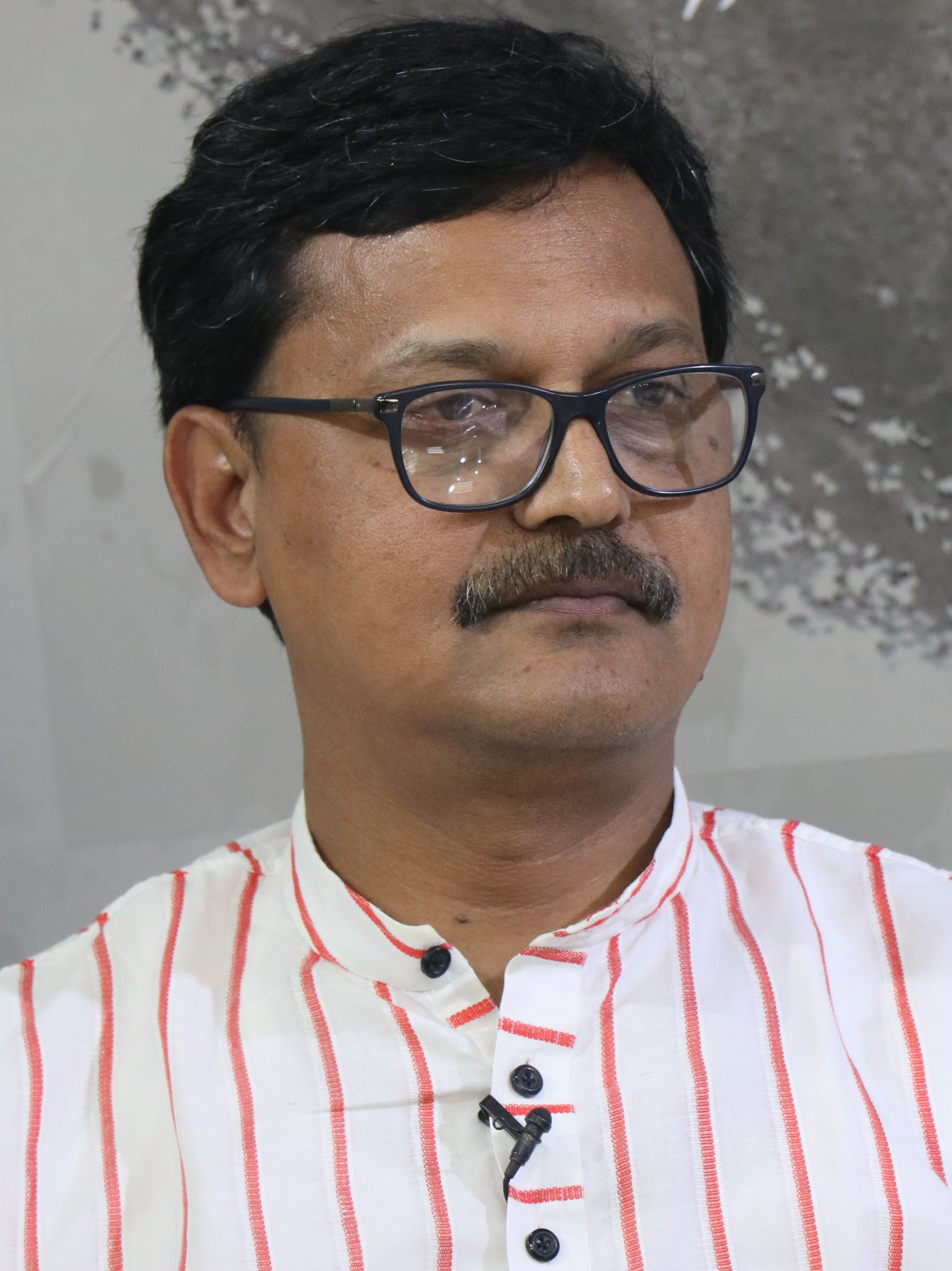
- Chowdhury in May 2018

Minister of State for Shipping
- In office 11 January 2024 – 6 August 2024
- Prime Minister: Sheikh Hasina
- Preceded by: M. A. Matin
- Succeeded by: M Sakhawat Hussain (as adviser)

Member of the Bangladesh Parliament for Dinajpur-2
- In office 29 December 2008 – 6 August 2024
- Preceded by: Muhammad Mahbubur Rahman
- Succeeded by: Md. Sadiq Riaz

Personal details
- Born: 31 January 1970 (age 56) Dinajpur, East Pakistan
- Party: Bangladesh Awami League
- Spouse: Mosammat Rashidun Ara Hasnin
- Parent: Abdur Rauf Chowdhury (father)

Khalid Mahmud Chowdhury (born 1 January 1970) is a Bangladesh Awami League politician and a former member of parliament representing the Dinajpur-2 constituency. He was the minister of state for shipping. He was an organizational secretary of the Awami League.

== Early life ==
Chowdhury was born on 31 January 1970. He has a bachelor's degree in commerce.

== Career ==
Chowdhury was elected to parliament from Dinajpur-2 in 2008, 2014, 2018, and 2024 for four consecutive times. He is the organizing secretary of the Bangladesh Awami League. In September 2018, he asked people in the region not to worry about the National Register of Citizens being carried out in India. He said this while on a trip to India. He was named state minister of shipping on 6 January 2019 in the 4th cabinet of Sheikh Hasina.

On 17 August 2024, Chowdhury was charged over an attack on a student protest during the quota reform movement on 18 July.
