= Ulipukuri =

Village in northern Bangladesh

Coordinates: 26.2371°N 88.5944°E

Ulipukuri is a village in Benghari Banagram Union under Boda Upazila of Panchagarh District, Bangladesh. It is 7 kilometres (4.3 mi) northeast of Boda town. It has a population of 500.
