= Abdul Kuddus =

Abdul Kuddus may refer to:

- Abdul Quddus Gangohi, Indian Sufi scholar
- Abdul Kuddus (politician), Bangladeshi politician
