= Pathraj Government College, Boda =

Pathraj Government College
- পাথরাজ সরকারি কলেজ
- Type: Government college
- Established: June 22, 1984
- Affiliations: National University of Bangladesh; Board of Intermediate and Secondary Education, Dinajpur
- Principal: Altaf Hossain
- Academic staff: 20
- Students: 1,512
- Undergraduates: 611
- Other students: 901
- Location: Moslempur, Nagar Kumari (West), Boda, Panchagarh, 5010, Bangladesh
- Campus: 9.03 acres (3.65 ha); Urban (municipal area)
- Language: Bengali
- Website: Official website

Pathraj Government College (Bengali: পাথরাজ সরকারি কলেজ) is a government higher secondary and undergraduate educational institution located in Boda Municipality, Boda Upazila, Panchagarh District, in the Rangpur Division of northern Bangladesh. The college was re-established in its present form in 1984 and currently provides education at the Higher Secondary Certificate (HSC) level as well as pass-level undergraduate programmes under the National University of Bangladesh.

== History ==
Pathraj College was initially founded in 1972; however, due to unavoidable circumstances, regular academic activities could not be continued at that time. With the initiative of local educationists and community leaders, a general meeting held on 22 June 1984 decided to restart the institution, and academic activities formally resumed on 1 July 1984.

At the beginning, classes were conducted at Boda Pilot High School. In 1985, the college permanently shifted to its present campus. Land donations played a crucial role in the establishment and expansion of the institution. In 1972, Nitai Chandra Sarkar and his family donated 1.68 acres of land at Satkhamar Mouza. Later, in 1985, Ejar Ali Chowdhury and his family donated 1.01 acres of land at Moslempur Mouza. Additional land was acquired from various individuals at nominal cost, bringing the total campus area to over eight acres, of which a major portion is used for academic infrastructure.

The college received approval to offer Humanities and Business Studies at the higher secondary level in 1984, followed by the introduction of the Science stream in the 1985–86 academic session. Undergraduate pass courses in Arts, Commerce, and Social Science were approved by University of Rajshahi in the 1991–92 academic session, while BSc (Pass) courses were introduced in 1992–93. Pathraj College became the first institution in Panchagarh District to offer a BSc (Pass) programme.

Under the government policy of nationalising at least one college in each upazila, Pathraj College was officially nationalised on 8 August 2018.

== Academic programmes ==
=== Higher secondary (HSC) ===
- Science
- Humanities
- Business Studies

=== Undergraduate (pass courses) ===
- Bachelor of Arts (BA)
- Bachelor of Business Studies (BBS)
- Bachelor of Social Science (BSS)
- Bachelor of Science (BSc)

== Students ==
As of 2025, the college has a total of 1,512 students, including 901 at the higher secondary level and 611 enrolled in undergraduate pass programmes.
