= Reazul Huq Chowdhury =

Bangladeshi politician

Reazul Haque Chowdhury
- রেয়াজুল হক চৌধুরী

Member of Parliament from Dinajpur-2
- In office 1988–1990
- Preceded by: Satish Chandra Roy
- Succeeded by: Satish Chandra Roy

Personal details
- Born: Dinajpur District
- Party: Jatiya Party
- Children: Md.Sadique Reaz Chowdhury (Pinak)

Reazul Huq Chowdhury is a Bangladeshi politician. He was elected a member of parliament from Dinajpur-2 in 1988.

== Career ==
Chowdhury was elected to parliament from Dinajpur-2 as an independent candidate in 1988. He then joined the Jatiya party. He was defeated from Dinajpur-2 constituency on 12 June 1996 on the nomination of Jatiya party.
