= Md. Kamiz Uddin =

Bangladeshi politician

Md. Kamiz Uddin Prodhan

Member of Bangladesh Parliament
- In office 1988–1991
- Preceded by: Mohammad Farhad
- Succeeded by: Mozahar Hossain

Personal details
- Party: Jatiya Party (Ershad)

Md. Kamiz Uddin Prodhan is a Jatiya Party (Ershad) politician in Bangladesh and a former member of parliament for Panchagarh-2.

== Career ==
Uddin was elected to parliament from Panchagarh-2 as a Jatiya Party candidate in 1988.
