= Sakoa Union =

Sakoa Union সাকোয়া ইউনিয়ন
- Union
- Sakoa Union
- Location within Bangladesh
- Coordinates: 26.1808°N 88.6314°E
- Country: Bangladesh
- Division: Rangpur
- District: Panchagarh
- Upazila: Boda

Area
  - Total: 24.76 km^{2} (9.56 sq mi)

Population (2011)
  - Total: 19,665
  - Density: 794.2/km^{2} (2,057/sq mi)
- Time zone: UTC+6 (BST)
- Website: sakoaup.panchagarh.gov.bd

Sakoa Union (Bengali: সাকোয়া ইউনিয়ন) is a union parishad of Boda Upazila, in Panchagarh District, Rangpur Division of Bangladesh. The union has an area of 24.73 square kilometres (9.55 sq mi) and as of 2001 had a population of 19,665. There are 42 villages and 9 mouzas in the union.
