= Panchagarh-2 =

Constituency of Bangladesh's Jatiya Sangsad

Coordinates: 26.20°N 88.55°E

- Constituency for the Jatiya Sangsad
- District: Panchagarh District
- Division: Rangpur Division
- Electorate: 417,529 (2026)

Current constituency
- Created: 1984
- Party: Bangladesh Nationalist Party
- Member: Farhad Hossain Azad
- ← 1 Panchagarh-1 3 Thakurgaon-1 →

Panchagarh-2 is a constituency represented in the Jatiya Sangsad (National Parliament) of Bangladesh since 2026 by Farhad Hossain Azad of the Bangladesh Nationalist Party.

== Boundaries ==
The constituency encompasses Boda and Debiganj upazilas and two parts of Atwari Upazila: Boda Municipality wards 8 and 9.

== History ==
The constituency was created in 1984 from a Dinajpur constituency when the former Dinajpur District was split into three districts: Panchagarh, Thakurgaon, and Dinajpur.

As of 2008, the constituency encompassed Boda and Debiganj upazilas.

Boda Municipality lies mostly in Boda Upazila, but its two wards southwest of the Pathraj River, 8 and 9, are in Atwari Upazila. Ahead of the 2026 general election, the Election Commission expanded the boundaries of the constituency by moving these two wards from Panchagarh-1 to Panchagarh-2.

== Members of Parliament ==
| Election | Member | Party |
|---|---|---|
| 1986 | Mohammad Farhad | Communist Party of Bangladesh |
| 1988 | Md. Kamiz Uddin | Jatiya Party |
| 1991 | Mozahar Hossain | Communist Party of Bangladesh |
| Feb 1996 | Mozahar Hossain | Bangladesh Nationalist Party |
| Jun 1996 | Mozahar Hossain | Bangladesh Nationalist Party |
| 2001 | Mozahar Hossain | Bangladesh Nationalist Party |
| 2008 | Nurul Islam Sujon | Awami League |
| 2026 | Farhad Hossain Azad | Bangladesh Nationalist Party |

== Elections ==
=== Elections in the 2020s ===
General Election 2026: Panchagarh-2
| Party | Candidate | Votes | % | ±% |
|---|---|---|---|---|
| BNP | Farhad Hossain Azad | 174,650 | 55.4 | N/A |
| Jamaat | Md. Shafiul Alam | 128,862 | 40.9 | N/A |
| IAB | Md. Kamrul Hasan Prodhan | 4,391 | 1.4 | N/A |
| JP(E) | Lutfur Rahman Ripon | 2,152 | 0.7 | N/A |
| Independent | Mahmud Hossain Sumon | 1,854 | 0.6 | N/A |
| BSP | Md. Delwar Hossain | 1,352 | 0.4 | N/A |
| BJSD | Md. Emran Al Amin | 953 | 0.3 | N/A |
| CPB | Md. Ashraful Alam | 935 | 0.3 | N/A |
| Majority | | 45,788 | 14.5 | N/A |
| Turnout | | 315,149 | 75.5 | N/A |
| Registered electors | | 417,529 | | |
| BNP gain from AL | | | | |

=== Elections in the 2010s ===
General Election 2014: Panchagarh-2
| Party | Candidate | Votes | % | ±% |
|---|---|---|---|---|
| AL | Nurul Islam Sujan | 107,360 | 93.6 | +33.2 |
| JSD | Md Emran Al Amin | 7,292 | 6.4 | N/A |
| Majority | | 100,068 | 87.3 | +65.8 |
| Turnout | | 114,652 | 40.0 | −53.0 |
| AL hold | | | | |

=== Elections in the 2000s ===
General Election 2008: Panchagarh-2
| Party | Candidate | Votes | % | ±% |
|---|---|---|---|---|
| AL | Nurul Islam Sujan | 142,488 | 60.4 | +16.7 |
| BNP | Mozahar Hossain | 91,700 | 38.9 | −7.0 |
| CPB | Md. Ashraful Alam | 926 | 0.4 | −0.5 |
| BTF | Md. Soona Miah | 731 | 0.3 | N/A |
| Majority | | 50,788 | 21.5 | +19.3 |
| Turnout | | 235,845 | 93.0 | +7.9 |
| AL gain from BNP | | | | |

General Election 2001: Panchagarh-2
| Party | Candidate | Votes | % | ±% |
|---|---|---|---|---|
| BNP | Mozahar Hossain | 83,653 | 45.9 | +10.0 |
| AL | Nurul Islam Sujan | 79,602 | 43.7 | +9.1 |
| IJOF | Md. Shafiul Alam Pradhan | 16,357 | 9.0 | N/A |
| CPB | Md. Salim Uddin | 1,673 | 0.9 | +0.2 |
| Independent | Taslim Uddin Ahmed | 898 | 0.5 | N/A |
| Jatiya Party (M) | Md. Jahangir Alam | 91 | 0.0 | N/A |
| Majority | | 4,051 | 2.2 | +0.9 |
| Turnout | | 182,274 | 85.1 | +8.4 |
| BNP hold | | | | |

=== Elections in the 1990s ===
General Election June 1996: Panchagarh-2
| Party | Candidate | Votes | % | ±% |
|---|---|---|---|---|
| BNP | Mozahar Hossain | 48,534 | 35.9 | +28.3 |
| AL | Md. Sirajul Islam | 46,815 | 34.6 | N/A |
| JP(E) | Md. Kamiz Uddin | 25,630 | 18.9 | −4.8 |
| Jamaat | Md. Saidur Rahman | 12,557 | 9.3 | −4.4 |
| CPB | Md. Salim Uddin | 952 | 0.7 | −38.5 |
| Zaker Party | Md. Mansur Ali | 459 | 0.3 | −0.2 |
| Independent | Md. Ashraful Islam | 395 | 0.3 | N/A |
| Majority | | 1,719 | 1.3 | −14.1 |
| Turnout | | 135,342 | 76.7 | +16.3 |
| BNP gain from CPB | | | | |

General Election 1991: Panchagarh-2
| Party | Candidate | Votes | % | ±% |
|---|---|---|---|---|
| CPB | Mozahar Hossain | 42,335 | 39.1 | |
| JP(E) | Md. Kamiz Uddin | 25,660 | 23.7 | |
| BNP | Md. Abdul Aziz | 17,300 | 16.0 | |
| Jamaat | Md. Saidur Rahman | 14,815 | 13.7 | |
| Independent | Md. Nurul Amin | 6,071 | 5.6 | |
| Independent | ASM Nuruzzaman | 930 | 0.9 | |
| Zaker Party | Md. Mansur Ali | 543 | 0.5 | |
| FP | Md. Abdal Adil Alvi | 355 | 0.3 | |
| Independent | Md. Safiullah | 137 | 0.1 | |
| Majority | | 16,675 | 15.4 | |
| Turnout | | 108,146 | 60.4 | |
| CPB gain from JP(E) | | | | |
