= Muhammad Nawshad Zamir =

Bangladeshi lawyer and politician (born 1970)

- মুহাম্মদ নওশাদ জমির
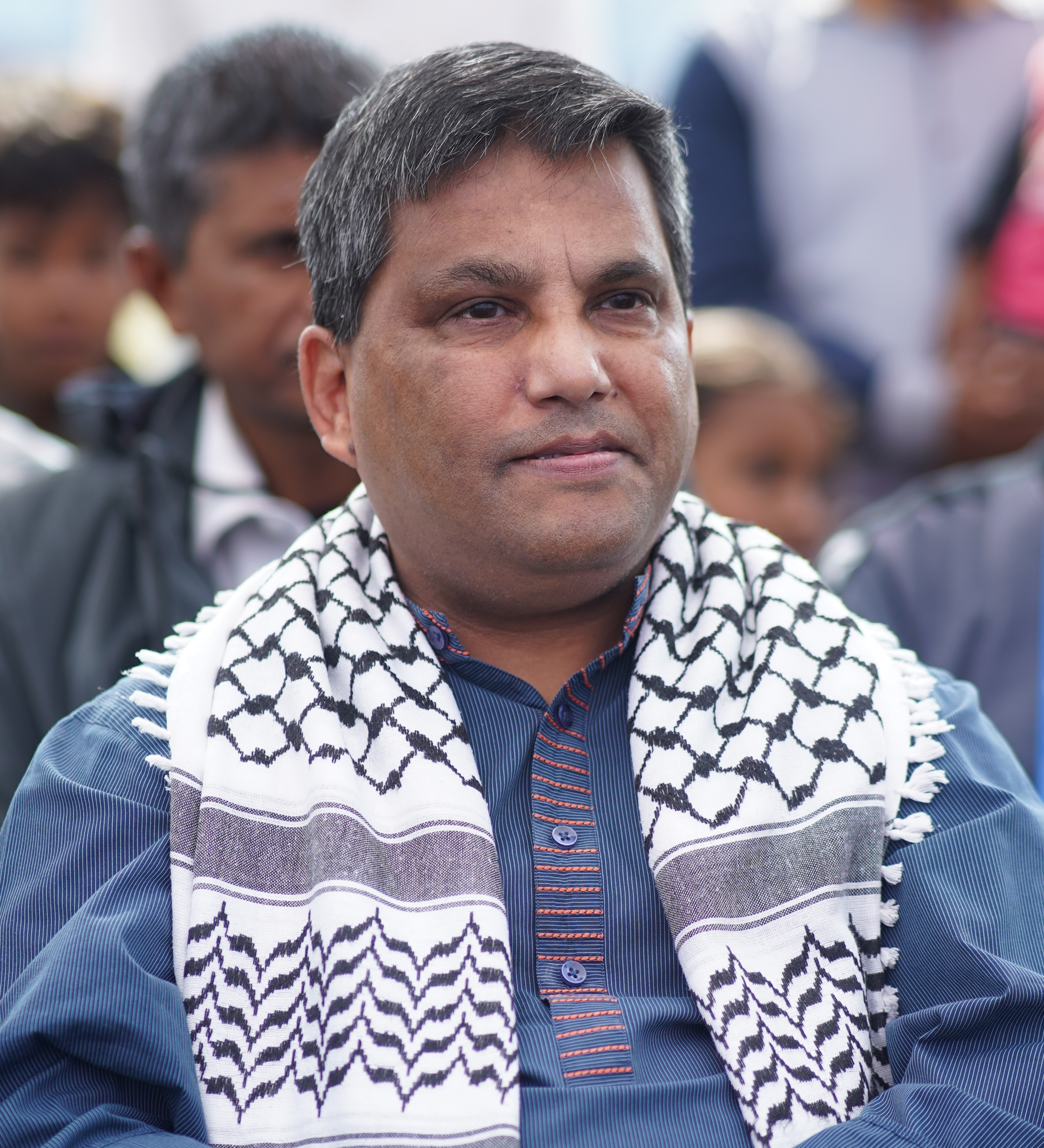
- Zamir in 2025

Member of the Bangladesh Parliament for Panchagarh-1
- Incumbent
- Assumed office 17 February 2026
- Preceded by: Naimuzzaman Bhuiyan

Personal details
- Born: 3 February 1970 (age 56) Dhaka, East Pakistan, Pakistan
- Party: Bangladesh Nationalist Party
- Spouse: Sonia Zaman Khan
- Parent: Muhammad Jamiruddin Sircar (father)
- Education: University of Oxford
- Occupation: Lawyer and politician
- Website: www.nawshadzamir.com

Muhammad Nawshad Zamir (born 3 February 1970) is a Bangladeshi barrister and politician. He is the incumbent Jatiya Sangsad member representing the Panchagarh-1 constituency (Panchagarh Sadar, Atwari and Tetulia upazilas) as a member of Bangladesh Nationalist Party (BNP) 2026 Bangladeshi general election.

== Early life and education ==
Muhammad Nawshad Zamir was born in Dhaka in the then East Pakistan to Barrister Muhammad Jamiruddin Sircar, who later became president, speaker, minister and member of parliament. Zamir passed his SSC from and HSC from Dhaka College. He completed his bachelor's and master's from the University of Dhaka, LLM from Harvard University, Masters of taxation from the University of Oxford and bar-at-law from Lincoln's Inn.

== Career ==
Zamir serves as a senior advocate at the Supreme Court of Bangladesh.

Zamir serves as international affairs secretary of the Bangladesh Nationalist Party. He contested the 2026 Bangladeshi general election from Panchagarh-1 and won by a margin of more than 8,000 votes.

== Electoral history ==
Year	Constituency	Party	Votes	%	Result
2026	Panchagarh-1	Bangladesh Nationalist Party	176,169	51.18	Won
