= Kajoldighi Kaligonj Union =

Kajoldighi Kaligonj Union ঝলইশালশিরি ইউনিয়ন
- Union
- Jholaishal Union
- Location within Bangladesh
- Coordinates: 26.2594°N 88.6572°E
- Country: Bangladesh
- Division: Rangpur
- District: Panchagarh
- Upazila: Boda

Area
  - Total: 38.52 km^{2} (14.87 sq mi)

Population (2011)
  - Total: 17,362
  - Density: 450.7/km^{2} (1,167/sq mi)
- Time zone: UTC+6 (BST)
- Website: kajoldighikaligonjup.panchagarh.gov.bd

Kajoldighi Kaligonj Union (Bengali: কাজলদিঘী কালিয়াগঞ্জ ইউনিয়ন) is a union parishad of Boda Upazila, in Panchagarh District, Rangpur Division of Bangladesh. The union has an area of 38.52 square kilometres (14.87 sq mi) and as of 2001 had a population of 17,362. There are 20 villages and 17 mouzas in the union.
