= Boroshoshi Union =

Boroshoshi Union বড়শশী ইউনিয়ন
- Union
- Boroshoshi Union
- Country: Bangladesh
- Division: Rangpur
- District: Panchagarh
- Upazila: Boda

Area
  - Total: 31.65 km^{2} (12.22 sq mi)

Population (2011)
  - Total: 25,700
  - Density: 812/km^{2} (2,100/sq mi)
- Time zone: UTC+6 (BST)
- Website: boroshoshiup.panchagarh.gov.bd

Boroshoshi Union (Bengali: বড়শশী ইউনিয়ন) is a union parishad situated at Boda Upazila, in Panchagarh District, Rangpur Division of Bangladesh. The union has an area of 31.65 square kilometres (12.22 sq mi) and as of 2001 had a population of 25,700. There are 15 villages and 12 mouzas in the union.
