= Md. Sadiq Riaz =

Bangladesh politician

- মোঃ সাদিক রিয়াজ

Member of Parliament
- Incumbent
- Assumed office 17 February 2026
- Preceded by: Khalid Mahmud Chowdhury
- Constituency: Dinajpur-2

Personal details
- Party: Bangladesh Nationalist Party

Md. Sadiq Riaz is a Bangladeshi politician from the Dinajpur District of Bangladesh and a Jatiya Sangsad member representing the Dinajpur-2 constituency since 2026.
