= Mazharul Haque Prodhan =

Bangladeshi politician

Member of Parliament
- In office 30 January 2019 – 10 January 2024
- Preceded by: Nazmul Haque Prodhan
- Succeeded by: Naimuzzaman Bhuiyan
- In office 25 January 2009 – 24 January 2014
- Preceded by: Muhammad Jamiruddin Sircar
- Succeeded by: Nazmul Haque Prodhan
- Constituency: Panchagarh-1

Personal details
- Born: 1 January 1953 (age 73) Panchagarh
- Party: Bangladesh Awami League

Mazharul Haque Prodhan (born 1 January 1953) is a Bangladesh Awami League politician and a former member of parliament for Panchagarh-1.

== Career ==
Prodhan was elected to parliament from Panchagarh-1 as a Bangladesh Awami League candidate on 30 December 2018.
