= Muhammad Jamiruddin Sircar =

President of Bangladesh in 2002 (1931–2026)

Muhammad Jamiruddin Sarkar
- মুহম্মদ জমিরুদ্দিন সরকার
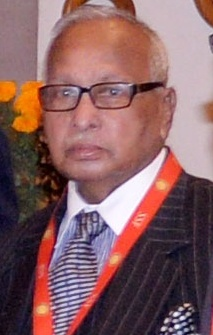
- Sarkar in 2016

Acting President of Bangladesh
- In office 21 June 2002 – 6 September 2002
- Prime Minister: Khaleda Zia
- Preceded by: A. Q. M. Badruddoza Chowdhury
- Succeeded by: Iajuddin Ahmed

10th Speaker of the Jatiya Sangsad
- In office 28 October 2001 – 26 January 2009
- Deputy: Akhtar Hameed Siddiqui
- Preceded by: Mohammad Abdul Hamid
- Succeeded by: Mohammad Abdul Hamid

Minister of Law and Justice Affairs
- In office 19 March 1996 – 30 March 1996
- Prime Minister: Khaleda Zia
- Preceded by: Mirza Golam Hafiz
- Succeeded by: Syed Ishtiaq Ahmed

Minister of Education
- In office 19 September 1991 – 19 March 1996
- Prime Minister: Khaleda Zia
- Preceded by: A. Q. M. Badruddoza Chowdhury
- Succeeded by: ASHK Sadek

Member of the Bangladesh Parliament for Panchagarh-1
- In office 14 July 1996 – 27 October 2006
- Preceded by: Mirza Ghulam Hafiz
- Succeeded by: Mazharul Haque Prodhan

Deputy Leader of the Opposition
- In office 26 January 2009 – 12 January 2014
- Preceded by: Mohammad Abdul Hamid
- Succeeded by: GM Quader
- In office 30 March 1996 – 28 October 2001
- Preceded by: Office established
- Succeeded by: Mohammad Abdul Hamid

Personal details
- Born: 1 December 1931 Tentulia, Bengal Presidency, British India
- Died: 12 July 2026 (aged 94) Dhaka, Bangladesh
- Party: Bangladesh Nationalist Party
- Spouse: Nur Akhtar (died 2023)
- Children: Muhammad Nawshad Zamir (son)
- Education: University of Dhaka

Muhammad Jamiruddin Sircar (Bengali pronunciation: [ˈd͡ʒɑmirʊdːin ˈʃɔrkɑr]; 1 December 1931 – 12 July 2026) was a Bangladeshi barrister and politician who served as the acting president of Bangladesh. Prior to serving as president, he served as the Speaker and held ministerial offices. He was one of the founding members of the Bangladesh Nationalist Party and was a member of its standing committee since its inception. He also established Barrister Jamiruddin Sircar Collegiate Institute in Panchagarh in 1990.

== Early life ==
Sircar was born on 1 December 1931 to a Bengali family of Muslim Sircars in the village of Nayabari in Tetulia, Jalpaiguri district, Bengal Presidency (now in Panchagarh District, Bangladesh). He was the son of jotedar Moulvi Ali Baksh and stay-at-home mother Begum Fakhrunnessa. He obtained his Bachelor of Arts (Honours) and Master of Arts degrees in history from the University of Dhaka. Later he got an LL.B degree from the University of Dhaka and joined the bar to practise law in 1960. He left for London in 1961 for the degree of Barrister-at-Law and was called to the Bar by the Honourable Society of Lincoln's Inn.

== Career ==
Sircar went to the Supreme Court of Bangladesh to work as a lawyer in constitutional, civil, and criminal law. In 1977, he was selected by the then president, Ziaur Rahman, as a member of the Bangladesh Delegation to the United Nations General Assembly. As a delegate, he looked after the Legal Committee and continued in this role for the next four years, between 1977 and 1980. In 1981, as a state minister of the Bangladesh government for the Ministry of Foreign Affairs, he travelled to the UN to deliberate on the Middle East peace process and disarmament. He later attended the Non-Aligned Movement's Labour Ministers Conference in Baghdad. He was elected to the parliament as a candidate of the Bangladesh Nationalist Party from Panchagarh-1 in the general elections of 1996 and 2001 and from Dhaka-9 in the by-election of 1991 in the seat of Begum Khaleda Zia. He lost the election in December 2008. He was elected to parliament in a by-election from Bogra-6 on 3 April 2009. Bogra-6 was vacated, along with Bogra-7, by former prime minister Khaleda Zia.

From 28 October 2001 to 25 January 2009, Sircar served as the Speaker of the Jatiya Sangsad. On 21 June 2002, he became acting president because of the resignation of A. Q. M. Badruddoza Chowdhury. He remained acting president until a new president was elected on 6 September 2002. As speaker, he refused to allow discussion on the 2004 Dhaka grenade attack in parliament. He faced criticism for being partisan in allocating seats in the parliament. In 2008, his defence of the Bangladesh Nationalist Party and call for its return to power drew criticism. The Daily Star wrote that the speaker should be above the political fray.

On 13 April 2009, an Awami League-led parliamentary probe body reported that Sircar took 2.7 million taka unlawfully as a medical bill without the permission of Prime Minister Khaleda Zia during his tenure as speaker of the parliament. On 8 November 2012, the Anti-Corruption Commission filed charges against him, alleging he misappropriated 3.3 million taka. Sircar moved the High Court Division of the Supreme Court of Bangladesh, and the proceedings were stayed. Thereafter, the Appellate Division passed an order to dispose of Sircar's judicial review applications before the High Court Division. In March 2023, he deposited Tk 2.8 million (27.86 lakh) to the state exchequer following a court judgement in the graft case.

In 2018, Sircar worked as Khaleda Zia's defence lawyer in the Zia Orphanage Trust corruption case.

== Personal life and death ==
Sircar was married to Nur Akhtar (c. 1939–2023). Together they had a daughter, Nilufar Jamir, and two sons, Barrister Muhammad Nawshad Zamir and Naufal Zamir.

He was the founder of the Barrister Jamiruddin Sircar Collegiate Institute in his birthplace, Panchagarh.

In 2019, he experienced a stroke after falling from a staircase at court.

Sircar died at the Bangladesh Specialized Hospital in Dhaka on 12 July 2026, at the age of 94.

== Bibliography ==
- Glimpses of International Law (1997);
- The Law of the Sea (2003);
- Stronger United Nations for Peaceful Welfare World (2003);
- London-er Chatro Andolon Bangla (2005);
- London-e Bondhu Bandhob Bangla (2006);
- Oshtom Shongshoder Speaker Bangla (2006);
- Pal Raj theke Plolashi ebong British Raj theke Bongo Bhobon Bangla (2006).
- Law of the International Rivers and others Water Courses (2007);
- Pakistan-er Gonotontrer Biporjoy ebong Shadhin Bangladesh-er Obbhuddoy Bangla (2008)
