= Benghari Banagram Union =

Coordinates: 26.2851°N 88.5854°E

Benghari Banagram Union (Bengali: বেংহারী বনগ্রাম ইউনিয়ন) is a union parishad under Boda Upazila of Panchagarh District in the Rangpur Division of northwestern Bangladesh. This union is situated 13 kilometres (8.1 mi) north east from Boda town. The area of this union nearly 30 square kilometers. Islam is the major religion of this union but a large number of Hindus population live here from long time ago. Some Santali Christians also live here. Boda, Maydandighi, Tepukuria, Mondolhat is the commercial centre for the residents.

== Location of attractions ==
1. Ulipukuri Dighi(Pond)
2. Ulipukuri Christian mission
3. Boalmari
4. Kazi Firms
5. Tepukuria
