= Dhaka-15 =

Constituency of Bangladesh's Jatiya Sangsad

Coordinates: 23.79°N 90.39°E

- Constituency for the Jatiya Sangsad
- District: Dhaka District
- Division: Dhaka Division
- Electorate: 344,293 (2026)

Current constituency
- Created: 1973 (Original); 2008 (Redistricted)
- Party: Bangladesh Jamaat-e-Islami
- Member: Shafiqur Rahman
- ← 187 Dhaka-14 189 Dhaka-16 →

Dhaka-15 is a constituency represented in the Jatiya Sangsad (National Parliament) of Bangladesh since 2026 by Shafiqur Rahman of the Bangladesh Jamaat-e-Islami.

== Boundaries ==
The constituency encompasses Dhaka North City Corporation wards 4, 13, 14, and 16.

== History ==
The constituency was created when, ahead of the 2008 general election, the Election Commission redrew constituency boundaries to reflect population changes revealed by the 2001 Bangladesh census. The 2008 redistricting added 7 new seats to the Dhaka metropolitan area, increasing the number of constituencies in the capital from 8 to 15.

== Members of Parliament ==
Election	Member	Party
1973	Shamim Misir	Awami League
1979	Mirza Ghulam Hafiz	Bangladesh Nationalist Party
Major Boundary Changes
2008	Kamal Ahmed Majumder	Awami League
2014	Kamal Ahmed Majumder	Awami League
2018	Kamal Ahmed Majumder	Awami League
2024	Kamal Ahmed Majumder	Awami League
2026	Shafiqur Rahman	Bangladesh Jamaat-e-Islami

== Elections ==
=== Elections in the 2020s ===
General election 2026: Dhaka-15
Party	Candidate	Votes	%	±%
Jamaat	Shafiqur Rahman	85,131	54.20	+54.20
BNP	Shafiqul Islam Khan Milton	63,517	40.44	+22.62
JP(E)	Md. Shamsul Haque	1,421	0.90	N/A
Majority		21,614	13.76	−47.62
Turnout		157,060	45.63	−18.76
Registered electors		344,293		
Jamaat gain from AL				

=== Elections in the 2010s ===
General Election 2018: Dhaka-15
Party	Candidate	Votes	%	±%
AL	Kamal Ahmed Majumder	175,165	79.90	−10.2
BNP	Shafiqur Rahman	39,071	17.82	N/A
JP(E)	Md. Samual Huq	716	0.03	N/A
Majority		135,094	61.38	−18.82
Turnout		214,942	64.39	+53.89
AL hold				

General Election 2014: Dhaka-15
Party	Candidate	Votes	%	±%
AL	Kamal Ahmed Majumder	30,095	90.1	+31.9
Independent	Ekhlas Uddin Molla	3,309	9.9	N/A
Majority		26,786	80.2	+58.8
Turnout		33,404	10.5	−61.2
AL hold				

=== Elections in the 2000s ===
General Election 2008: Dhaka-15
Party	Candidate	Votes	%	±%
AL	Kamal Ahmed Majumder	120,780	58.2	N/A
BNP	Muhammad Hamidullah Khan	76,472	36.9	N/A
Independent	Abdul Kader	6,689	3.2	N/A
IAB	Mufti Tajul Islam	2,532	1.2	N/A
CPB	Ahmed Sajedul Haque	628	0.3	N/A
NPP	Sheikh Shawkat Hossain	192	0.1	N/A
BTF	Syed Rezaul Haque Chandpuri	130	0.1	N/A
JSD	Md. Fayekuzzaman	75	0.0	N/A
Majority		44,308	21.4	N/A
Turnout		207,498	71.7	N/A
AL win (new seat)				
