= Naimuzzaman Bhuiyan =

Bangladeshi politician

Naimuzzaman Bhuiyan Mukta
- নাঈমুজ্জামান ভুইয়াঁ মুক্তা
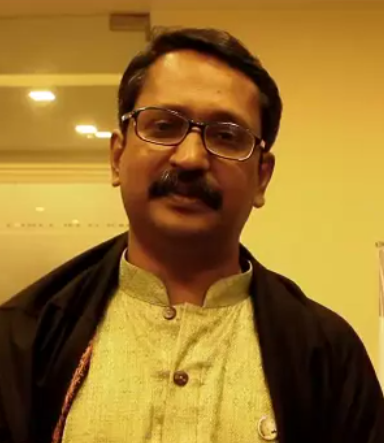

Member of the Bangladesh Parliament for Panchagarh-1
- In office 10 January 2024 – 6 August 2024
- Preceded by: Mazharul Haque Prodhan
- Succeeded by: Muhammad Nawshad Zamir

Personal details
- Born: 14 May 1973 (age 53) Atwari Upazila, Panchagarh, Bangladesh
- Party: Awami League
- Spouse: Kazi Mousomi

Mohd. Naimuzzaman Bhuiyan Mukta (Bengali: নাঈমুজ্জামান ভুইয়াঁ মুক্তা; born 14 May 1973) is a Bangladesh Awami League politician and the former Jatiya Sangsad member representing the Panchagarh-1 constituency from January to July 2024.

== Career ==
Bhuiyan was elected to parliament from Panchagarh-1 as a Bangladesh Awami League candidate on 7 January 2024.

Bhuiyan was in controversy in December 2023 for his threat to the people not to support his opponent, Mazharul Haque Prodhan; otherwise, he would break their bones. As a result, he received a show cause notice for violating the electoral code of conduct.

== Personal life ==
Bhuiyan is married to retired Bangladesh Army Major Kazi Mousumi. In June 2026, she was sent to jail after a Panchagarh court rejected her bail application in a case filed under the Anti-Terrorism Act, 2009. Prosecutors alleged that she had led a gathering marking the Awami League's founding anniversary in 2025. She denied the allegations and had previously obtained temporary bail from the High Court.
