= Marea Bamonhat Union =

Marea Bamonhat Union মাড়েয়া বামনহাট ইউনিয়ন
- Union
- Marea Bamonhat Union
- Location within Bangladesh
- Coordinates: 26.2250°N 88.6775°E
- Country: Bangladesh
- Division: Rangpur
- District: Panchagarh
- Upazila: Boda

Area
  - Total: 31.65 km^{2} (12.22 sq mi)

Population (2011)
  - Total: 25,700
  - Density: 812/km^{2} (2,100/sq mi)
- Time zone: UTC+6 (BST)
- Website: mareabamonhatup.panchagarh.gov.bd

Marea Bamonhat Union (Bengali: মাড়েয়া বামনহাট ইউনিয়ন) is a union parishad of Boda Upazila, in Panchagarh District, Rangpur Division of Bangladesh. The union has an area of 31.65 square kilometres (12.22 sq mi) and as of 2001 had a population of 25,700. There are 23 villages and 12 mouzas in the union.
