= Mohona Television =

Bangladeshi television channel

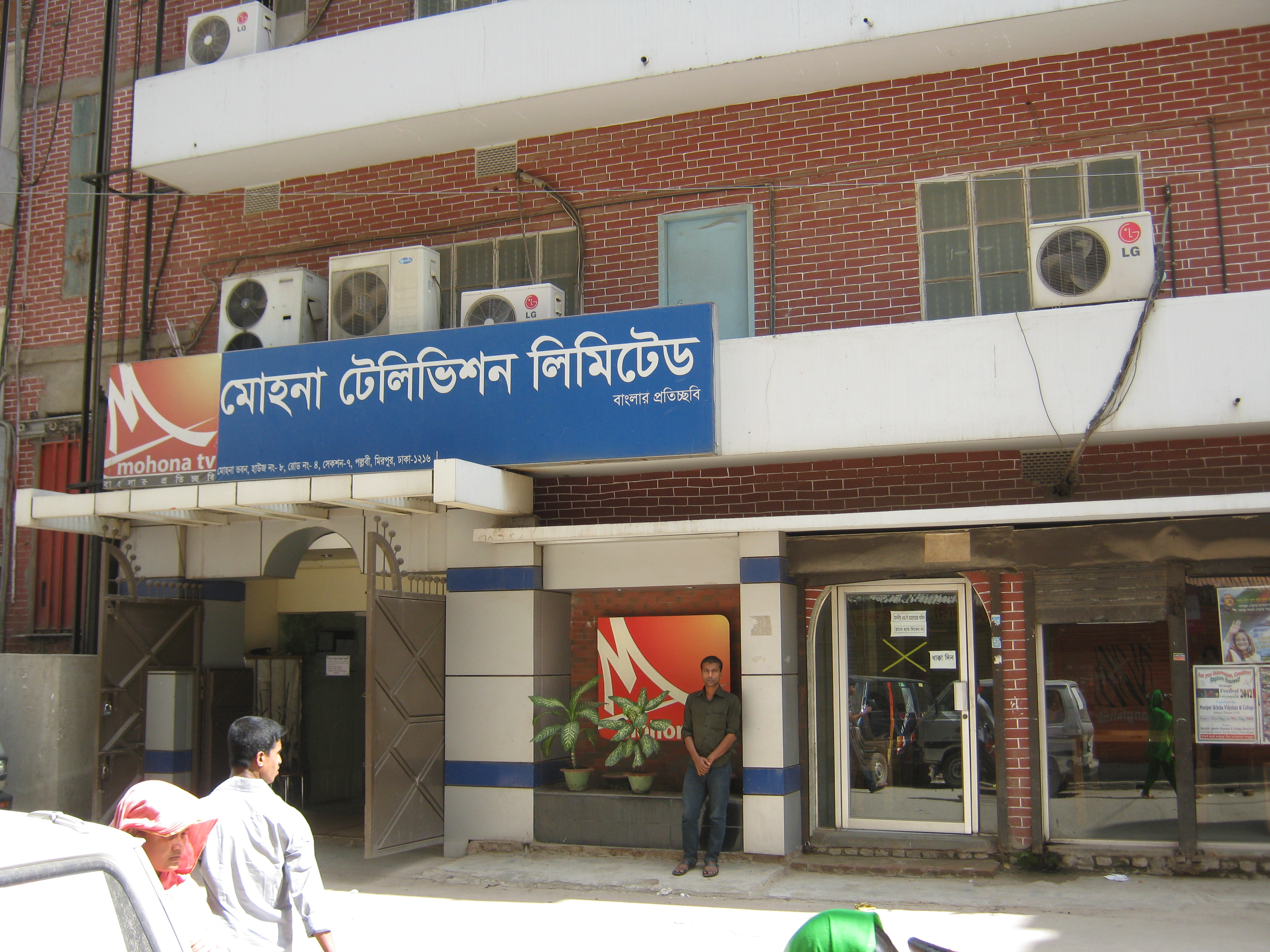
- The headquarters of Mohona Television in Mirpur
- Country: Bangladesh
- Broadcast area: Nationwide
- Headquarters: Mirpur, Dhaka

Programming
- Language: Bengali
- Picture format: 1080i HDTV (downscaled to 16:9 576i for SDTV sets)

Ownership
- Owner: Mohona Television Limited
- Key people: Kamal Ahmed Majumder (chairman)

History
- Launched: 11 November 2010; 15 years ago

Links
- Website: www.mohona.tv

Mohona Television (Bengali: মোহনা টেলিভিশন; lit. 'channel television'), also known as Mohona TV, stylized as mohona tv, is a Bangladeshi Bengali-language privately owned satellite and cable television channel. It is headquartered in Pallabi, Mirpur, Dhaka. The channel primarily broadcasts news and entertainment programming, including films and musical programming.

== History ==
Member of Parliament Kamal Ahmed Majumder-owned Mohona Television was granted a broadcasting license by the Bangladesh Telecommunication Regulatory Commission, along with other privately owned Bangladeshi television channels, on 20 October 2009. The channel commenced test transmissions on 31 July 2010, and officially began broadcasting on 11 November 2010 with the "Banglar Proticchobi" (বাংলার প্রতিচ্ছবি; lit. 'The reflection of Bengal') slogan, with the intention to promote the Bengali culture and language using newer technology.

On the occasion of the month of Ramadan, Mohona Television was one of the eight television channels to broadcast the cooking series Pran Premium Ghee Star Cook in July 2014. On 28 May 2017, the managing director of Mohona Television, Ziauddin Ahmed Makumder, had died. Dhaka Reporters Unity condemned the attack on the headquarters of Mohona Television among other media outlets during the post-resignation violence shortly after prime minister Sheikh Hasina resigned on 5 August 2024. Mohona Television was one of the Bangladeshi channels whose YouTube channels were geo-blocked in India on 9 May 2025, citing threat to national security concerns during the 2025 India-Pakistan conflict.

== Programming ==
- Ajker Banalata Sen
- Drishtikon
- Nil Jyotsnae Kalo Sap
- Ronger Songsar
- Surer Mohona
- Talkana
- Quick Marriage

== Gallery ==
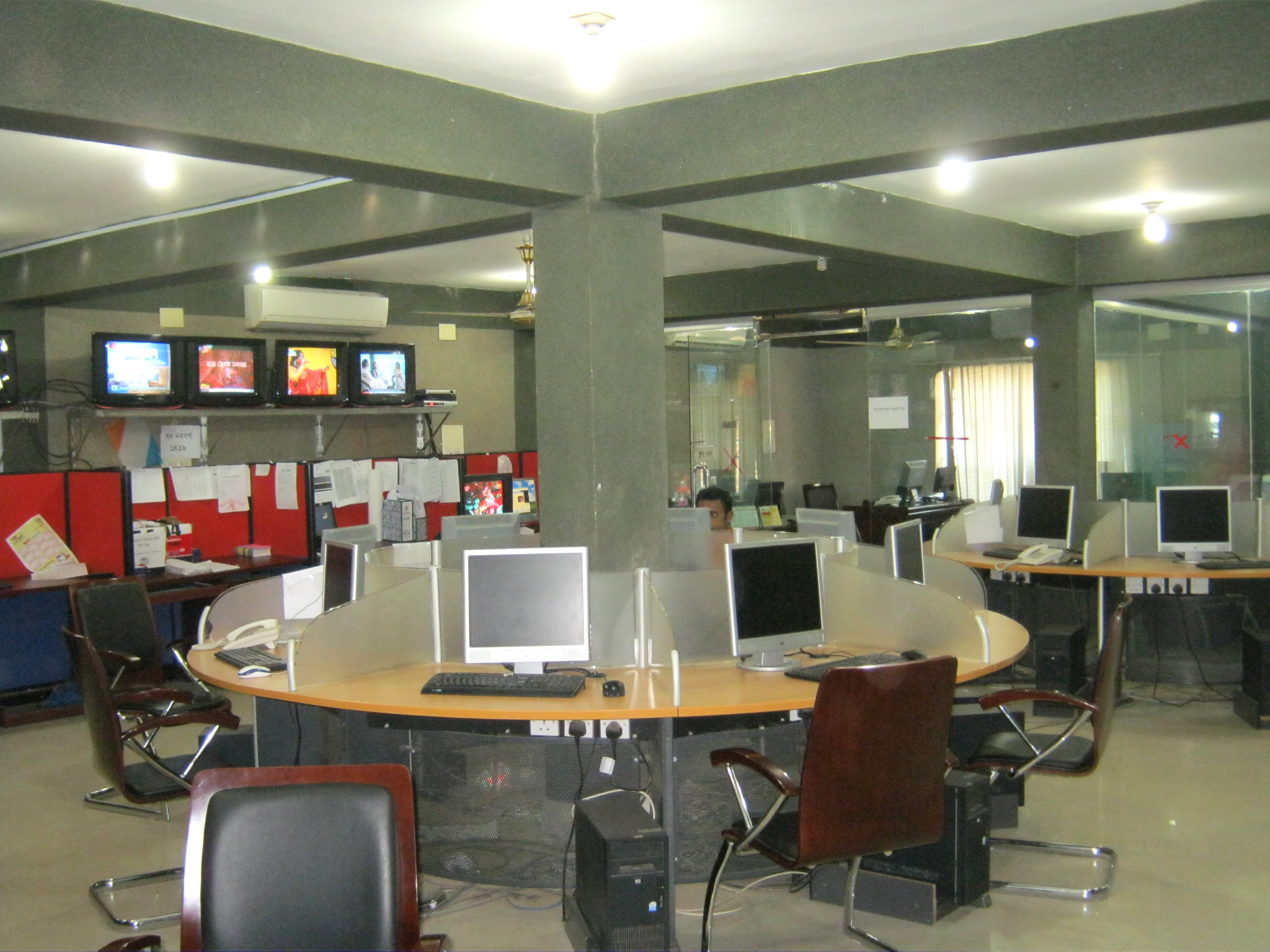
Newsroom

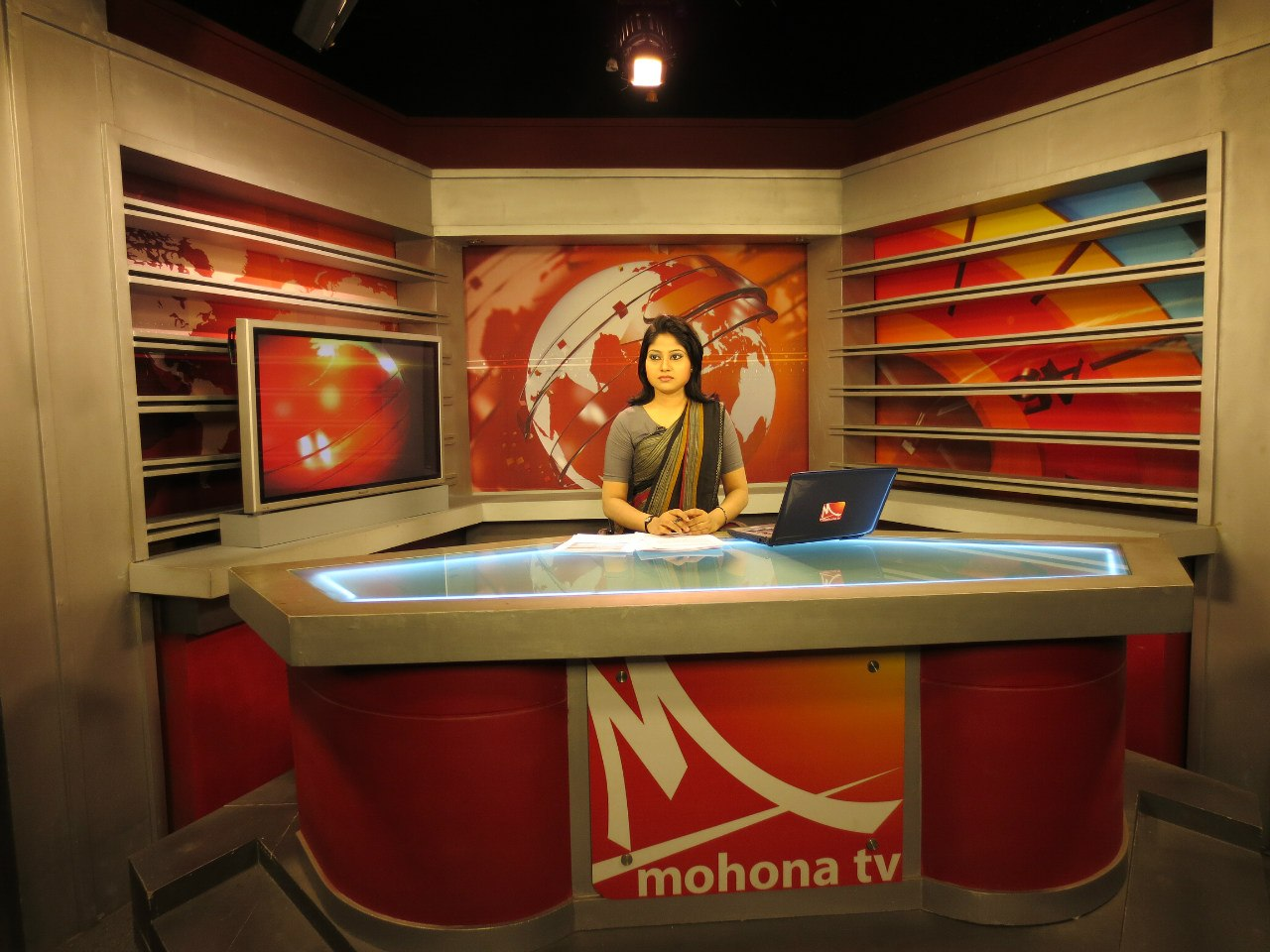
News Presenter Roksana Choudhury

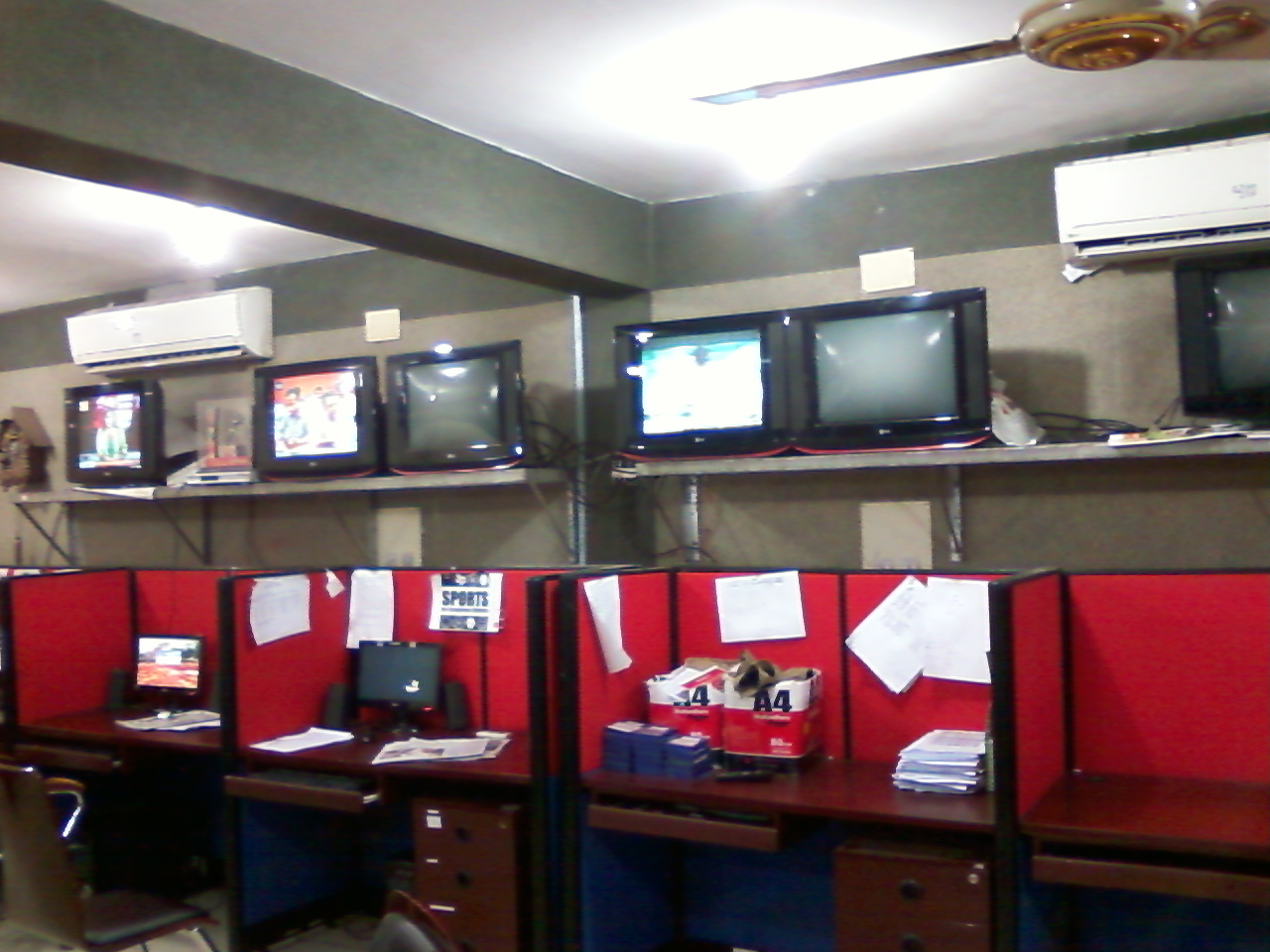
News room

== See also ==
- List of television stations in Bangladesh
