= Jholaishal Shiri Union =

Jholaishal Union ঝলইশালশিরি ইউনিয়ন
- Union
- Jholaishal Union
- Location within Bangladesh
- Coordinates: 26.2429°N 88.5168°E
- Country: Bangladesh
- Division: Rangpur
- District: Panchagarh
- Upazila: Boda

Area
  - Total: 41.46 km^{2} (16.01 sq mi)

Population (2011)
  - Total: 18,362
  - Density: 442.9/km^{2} (1,147/sq mi)
- Time zone: UTC+6 (BST)
- Website: jholaishalshiriup.panchagarh.gov.bd

Jholaishal Union (Bengali: ঝলইশালশিরি ইউনিয়ন) is a union parishad of Boda Upazila, in Panchagarh District, Rangpur Division of Bangladesh. The union has an area of 41.46 square kilometres (16.01 sq mi) and as of 2001 had a population of 18,362. There are 20 villages and 17 mouzas in the union.
