= Boda Union =

Boda Union বোদা ইউনিয়ন
- Union
- Boda Union
- Location within Bangladesh
- Coordinates: 26.2199°N 88.5836°E
- Country: Bangladesh
- Division: Rangpur
- District: Panchagarh
- Upazila: Boda

Area
  - Total: 47.68 km^{2} (18.41 sq mi)

Population (2011)
  - Total: 14,792
  - Density: 310.2/km^{2} (803.5/sq mi)
- Time zone: UTC+6 (BST)
- Website: bodaup.panchagarh.gov.bd

Boda Union (Bengali: বোদা ইউনিয়ন) is a union parishad of Boda Upazila, in Panchagarh District, Rangpur Division of Bangladesh. The union has an area of 47.68 square kilometres (18.41 sq mi) and as of 2001 had a population of 14,792. There are 23 villages and 13 mouzas in the union.
