= Mozahar Hossain =

Bangladeshi politician

Member of Parliament

Personal details
- Born: 1945‌ (Approximate) Boda, Jalpaiguri district, Bengal Presidency
- Died: 2016
- Party: Bangladesh Nationalist Party
- Other political affiliations: Communist Party of Bangladesh

Mozahar Hossain (1945–2016) was a Bangladeshi politician and the former Member of Parliament from Panchagarh-2.

== Career ==
Hossain was elected to Parliament from Panchagarh-2 as a Communist Party of Bangladesh candidate in 1991. He later joined Bangladesh Nationalist Party and was re-elected as a BNP candidate in 1996 and 2001. He served as the President of Panchagarh District unit of Bangladesh Nationalist Party.

== Death ==
Hossain died on 3 October 2016.
