= Pachpir Union =

Pachpir Union পাঁচপীর ইউনিয়ন
- Union
- Pachpir Union
- Location within Bangladesh
- Coordinates: 26.1199°N 88.6298°E
- Country: Bangladesh
- Division: Rangpur
- District: Panchagarh
- Upazila: Boda

Area
  - Total: 71.93 km^{2} (27.77 sq mi)

Population (2011)
  - Total: 23,000
  - Density: 320/km^{2} (830/sq mi)
- Time zone: UTC+6 (BST)
- Website: pachpirup.panchagarh.gov.bd

Pachpir Union (Bengali: পাঁচপীর ইউনিয়ন) is a union parishad of Boda Upazila, in Panchagarh District, Rangpur Division of Bangladesh. The union has an area of 71.93 square kilometres (27.77 sq mi) and as of 2001 had a population of 23,000. There are 61 villages and 12 mouzas in the union.
