= Chandanbari Union =

Chandanbari Union চন্দনবাড়ী ইউনিয়ন
- Union
- Chandanbari Union
- Country: Bangladesh
- Division: Rangpur
- District: Panchagarh
- Upazila: Boda

Area
  - Total: 18.10 km^{2} (6.99 sq mi)

Population (2011)
  - Total: 20,121
  - Density: 1,112/km^{2} (2,879/sq mi)
- Time zone: UTC+6 (BST)
- Website: chandanbariup.panchagarh.gov.bd

Chandanbari Union (Bengali: চন্দনবাড়ী ইউনিয়ন) is a union parishad of Boda Upazila, in Panchagarh District, Rangpur Division of Bangladesh. The union has an area of 18.10 square kilometres (6.99 sq mi) and as of 2001 had a population of 20,121. There are 43 villages and 12 mouzas in the union.
