= Mahbubur Rahman (lieutenant general) =

Former (8th) Army chief of Bangladesh

- মাহবুবুর রহমান
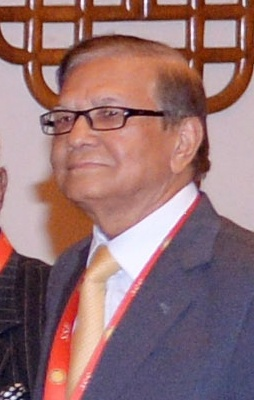
- Mahbub in 2016

8th Chief of Army Staff
- In office 20 May 1996 – 23 December 1997
- President: Abdur Rahman Biswas; Shahabuddin Ahmed
- Prime Minister: Muhammad Habibur Rahman (acting); Sheikh Hasina
- Preceded by: Abu Saleh Mohammad Nasim
- Succeeded by: Mustafizur Rahman

Personal details
- Party: Bangladesh Nationalist Party
- Education: Dhaka College; Pakistan Military Academy; BUET

Military service
- Allegiance: Bangladesh; Pakistan (before 1971)
- Branch: Bangladesh Army; Pakistan Army
- Service years: 1964–1997
- Rank: Lieutenant General
- Unit: Corps of Engineers
- Commands: Commander of 14th Independent Engineers Brigade; ENC of Army Headquarters; GOC of 19th Infantry Division; Commandant of Defence Services Command and Staff College; MGO of Army Headquarters; 9th Chief of Army Staff
- Conflict: Bangladesh War of Independence

Mahbubur Rahman is a retired lieutenant general of the Bangladesh Army who served as the Chief of Army Staff of the Bangladesh Army from May 1996 to December 1997. He graduated from Bangladesh University of Engineering and Technology in civil engineering. He was commissioned in the Pakistan Army Corps of Engineers from the 17th special course on 2 March 1964.

== Early life and education ==
He was born in Jagatpur, Biral Upazila, Dinajpur District. He passed his matriculation from Dinajpur Zila School in 1956. He completed his intermediate from Dhaka College. In 1963 he completed his BSc in civil engineering from Bangladesh University of Engineering and Technology. Later he joined the Pakistan Army.

== Military career ==
He was commissioned in the Pakistan Army Corps of Engineers from the 17th Special Course on 2 March 1964.. He was also largely involved in quelling the 1996 coup in Bangladesh against president Abdur Rahman Biswas, being appointed as the Chief of Army Staff of the Bangladesh army afterwards.

== Politics ==
He joined the Bangladesh Nationalist Party (BNP) after retirement from the Bangladesh Army. He is a former standing committee member of the BNP. In the 8th National Parliament election in 2001, he was elected as a member of parliament from the Dinajpur-2 constituency on the nomination of BNP. He left the BNP in 2019.
