= Nazmul Haque Bappy =

Bangladeshi painter

- নাজমুল হক বাপ্পী
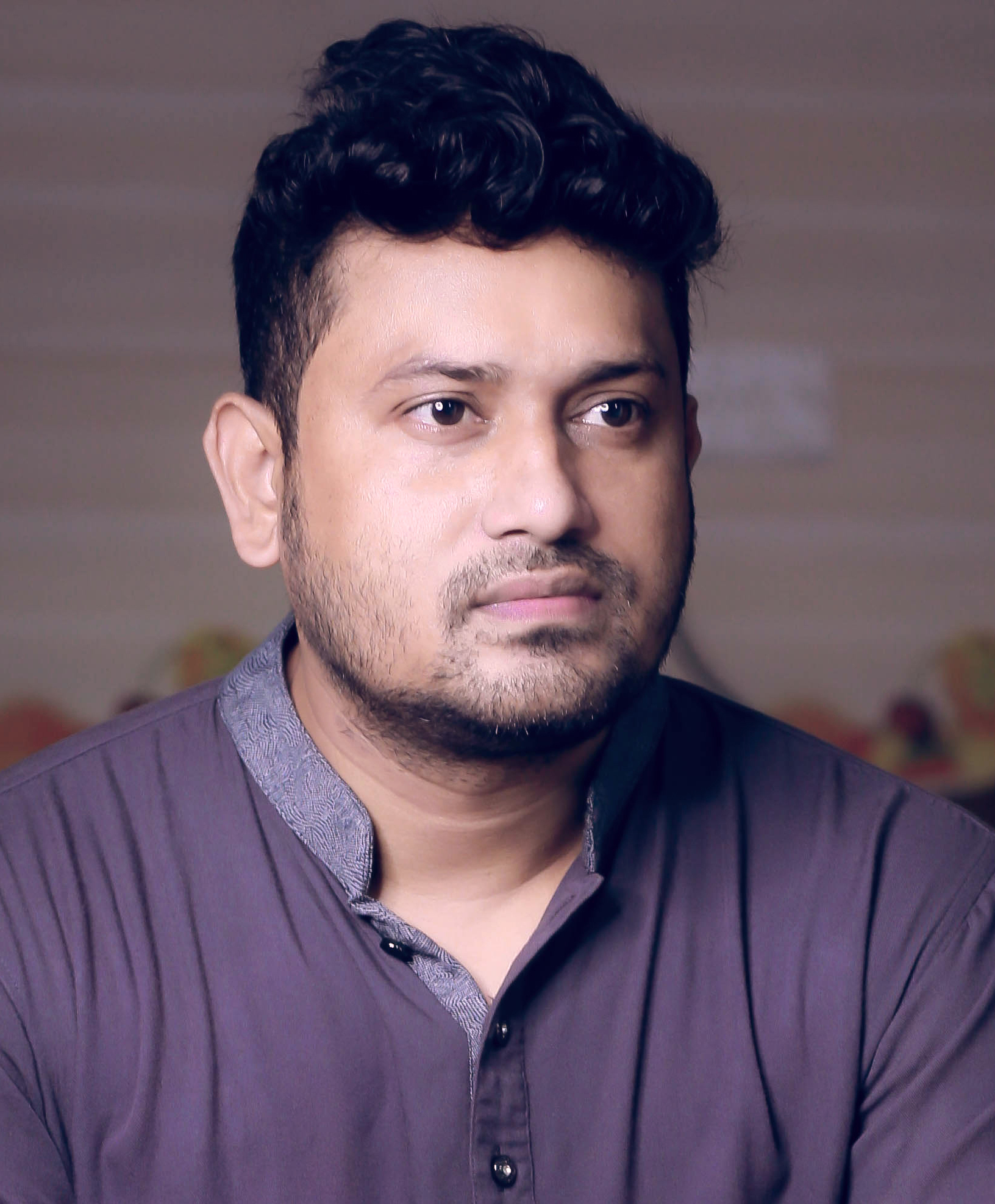
- Born: Dhaka, Bangladesh
- Education: University of Dhaka
- Occupations: Television director, painter and lecturer
- Years active: 2011 – present
- Known for: Bhalobashi Ajo
- Awards: China Bangladesh Friendship Award

Md Nazmul Haque Bappy (Bengali: নাজমুল হক বাপ্পী) is a Bangladeshi director, and painter. He has received several awards, including Berger Paints Award UNAIDS Grand Award, China Bangladesh Friendship Award, Grand Award in International Korean Art Festival, and Award in Art Are-China Exhibition.

== Early life ==
Bappy was born on 27 December in Dhaka, Bangladesh. He completed his BFA and MFA from the Department of Oriental Art, Faculty of Fine Art, University of Dhaka. Bappy had obtained a higher degree in Chinese painting with a fully funded scholarship from the Chinese government.

== Career ==
Bappy began his career as a director in Osomapto television drama in 2014. He is also a professional painter. He is performing as a lecturer in the Faculty of fine arts at University of Development Alternative.

== Notable TV dramas and telefilms ==
- Osomapto
- Akash Meghe Dhaka
- Bokarai Preme Pore
- Bhalobashi Ajo
- Tomay Niye
- Opekkha
- Kotha Chilo
- Ami Ovinoy Korini
- Ami Tomar Akash Hobo
- Chai Ronger Golpo

== Solo painting exhibitions ==
- 2011 : Expression of freedom, Alliance Françoise de Dhaka
- 2011 : Expression of freedom - 2, Zainul Gallery, Faculty of Fine Arts, University of Dhaka
- 2012 : Absorb Nature, Alliance Française de Dhaka
- 2013 : The Oriental Life, Gallery Chitrak, Dhaka
- 2013: Playing with Colors, Athena Gallery, University of Dhaka
- 2014 : Nature & Beauty, Shijiazhuang, China
- 2014 : Natural Rhythm, Hubei Normal University Museum, China
- 2015: Nature, Shijiazhuang, China
- 2017 : An Eternal Journey, Alliance Françoise de Dhaka
