= Dinajpur-2 =

Constituency of Bangladesh's Jatiya Sangsad

Coordinates: 25.63°N 88.55°E

- Constituency for the Jatiya Sangsad
- District: Dinajpur District
- Division: Rangpur Division
- Electorate: 371,478 (2026)

Current constituency
- Created: 1973
- Party: Bangladesh Nationalist Party
- Member: Md. Sadiq Riaz
- ← 6 Dinajpur-1 8 Dinajpur-3 →

Dinajpur-2 is a constituency represented in the Jatiya Sangsad (National Parliament) of Bangladesh since 2026 by Md. Sadiq Riaz of the Bangladesh Nationalist Party.

== Boundaries ==
The constituency encompasses Biral and Bochaganj upazilas.

== History ==
The constituency was created for the first general elections in newly independent Bangladesh, held in 1973.

== Members of Parliament ==
Election	Member	Party
1973	Sirajul Islam	Awami League
Major Boundary Changes
1986	Satish Chandra Roy	Awami League
1988	Reazul Huq Chowdhury	Jatiya Party
1991	Satish Chandra Roy	Awami League
Feb 1996	Mujibur Rahman	Bangladesh Nationalist Party
Jun 1996	Satish Chandra Roy	Awami League
2001	Muhammad Mahbubur Rahman	Bangladesh Nationalist Party
2008	Khalid Mahmud Chowdhury	Awami League
2014	Khalid Mahmud Chowdhury	Awami League
2018	Khalid Mahmud Chowdhury	Awami League
2024	Khalid Mahmud Chowdhury	Awami League
2026	Md. Sadiq Riaz	Bangladesh Nationalist Party

== Elections ==
=== Elections in the 2020s ===
General election 2026: Dinajpur-2
Party	Candidate	Votes	%	±%
BNP	Md. Sadiq Riaz	144,317		
Jamaat	A.K.M. Afzalul Anam	101,831		N/A
Majority		42,486		
Turnout				
Registered electors		371,478		
BNP gain from AL				

=== Elections in the 2010s ===
Khalid Mahmud Chowdhury was re-elected unopposed in the 2014 general election after opposition parties withdrew their candidacies in a boycott of the election.

=== Elections in the 2000s ===
General Election 2008: Dinajpur-2
Party	Candidate	Votes	%	±%
AL	Khalid Mahmud Chowdhury	138,152	60.4	+22.3
BNP	Muhammad Mahbubur Rahman	89,419	39.1	−3.5
Independent	Jalal Uddin Ahamed	985	0.4	N/A
Majority		48,733	21.3	+16.9
Turnout		228,556	92.9	+7.0
AL gain from BNP				

General Election 2001: Dinajpur-2
Party	Candidate	Votes	%	±%
BNP	Muhammad Mahbubur Rahman	79,490	42.6	+25.8
AL	Satish Chandra Roy	71,229	38.1	−0.7
IJOF	Md. Anowarul Huq Chowdhury	33,280	17.8	N/A
Independent	Md. Kachim Uddin	1,498	0.8	N/A
Bangladesh Janata Party	Abdullah Al Naser	1,244	0.7	−0.1
Majority		8,261	4.4	−1.2
Turnout		186,741	85.9	+4.8
BNP gain from AL				

=== Elections in the 1990s ===
General Election June 1996: Dinajpur-2
Party	Candidate	Votes	%	±%
AL	Satish Chandra Roy	55,551	38.8	−1.1
JP(E)	A. F. M. Reazul Haq Chowdhury	47,611	33.3	+7.1
BNP	M. A. Zalil	24,044	16.8	+9.3
Jamaat	Mahbub Alam	13,663	9.6	−11.2
Bangladesh Janata Party	Abdullah Al Naser	1,153	0.8	−3.3
JSD	Taimur Rahman	482	0.3	+0.1
Jatiya Samajtantrik Dal-JSD	Md. Abdul Hye	314	0.2	−0.1
Zaker Party	Md. A.T.M. Rezaul	198	0.1	0.0
Majority		7,940	5.6	−8.1
Turnout		143,016	81.1	+9.7
AL gain from BNP				

General Election 1991: Dinajpur-2
Party	Candidate	Votes	%	±%
AL	Satish Chandra Roy	49,440	39.9	
JP(E)	A. F. M. Reazul Huq Chowdhury	32,508	26.2	
Jamaat	Md. Shah Moksul Minar	25,766	20.8	
BNP	Md. Abdul Momen Chowdhury	9,316	7.5	
Bangladesh Janata Party	Md. Razzak Chowdhury	5,097	4.1	
Janasakti Party	Abdullah Al Naser	918	0.7	
JSD	Md. Azizul Haq	286	0.2	
Independent	Md. Mamunur Rashid	193	0.2	
JSD (S)	A. Malek	173	0.1	
Zaker Party	Md. Abul Hossein	138	0.1	
Jatiya Samajtantrik Dal-JSD	Md. Abdul Hye	90	0.1	
Majority		16,932	13.7	
Turnout		123,925	71.4	
AL gain from				
