= Abdul Kuddus (politician) =

Bangladeshi politician

Member of Parliament for Panchagarh-1
- In office 1988–1991
- Preceded by: Sirajul Islam
- Succeeded by: Mirza Ghulam Hafiz

Personal details
- Party: Jatiya Party (Ershad)

Abdul Kuddus is a Jatiya Party (Ershad) politician and a former member of parliament for Panchagarh-1.

== Career ==
Kuddus was elected to parliament from Panchagarh-1 as a Jatiya Party candidate in 1988.
