= Kamal Ahmed Majumder =

Bangladeshi politician

- কামাল আহমেদ মজুমদার
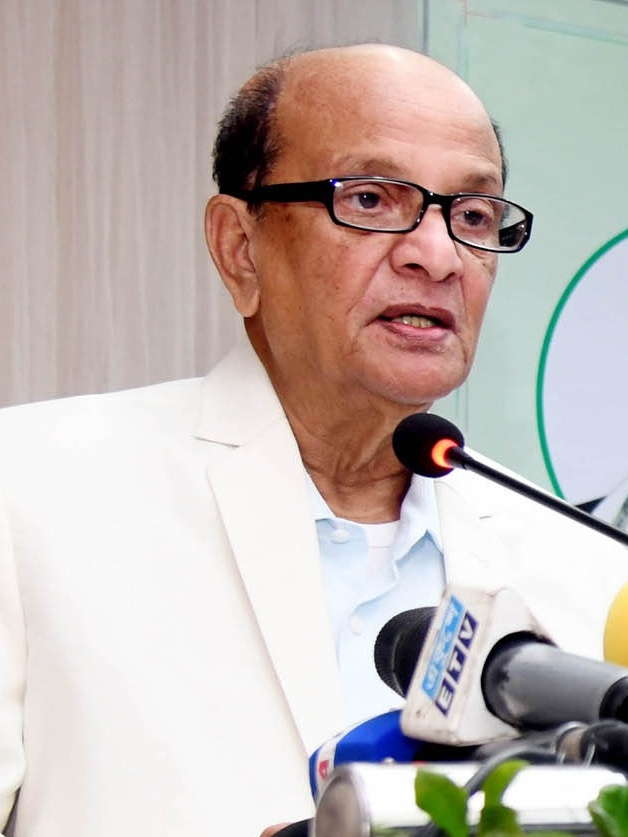
- Majumder in 2022

Member of Parliament
- In office 25 January 2009 – 6 August 2024
- Preceded by: Position established
- Succeeded by: Shafiqur Rahman
- Constituency: Dhaka-15

Minister of State for Industries
- In office 7 January 2019 – 10 January 2024
- Preceded by: Omor Faruk Chowdhury

Personal details
- Born: 3 March 1950 (age 76) Feni, East Bengal, Dominion of Pakistan
- Party: Bangladesh Awami League
- Occupation: Politician

Kamal Ahmed Majumder (born 3 March 1950) is a Bangladesh Awami League politician and a former Jatiya Sangsad member representing the Dhaka-15 since its inception in 2009 until 2024. He served as a State Minister of Industries during 2019–2024 at the fourth Hasina ministry.

== Early life ==
Majumder graduated with a B.A. degree.

== Career ==
Majumder contested the controversial by-election in Mirpur on 3 February 1993. He lost the election to Bangladesh Nationalist Party candidate Sayed Muhammad Mohsin. He was arrested in August 2002 by Bangladesh Police during the Bangladesh Nationalist Party government. Amnesty International feared that he would be tortured in custody.

Majumder was elected to Parliament in the 2008 Bangladeshi general election, beating Bangladesh Nationalist Party candidate Muhammad Hamidullah Khan. On 22 October 2013 his car was attacked with Molotov cocktails outside Mohona TV. He was elected to Parliament in the General Election 2014 as a candidate of Bangladesh Awami League from Dhaka-15. He beat his nearest rival Ekhlas Uddin Molla, an independent candidate by 26,786 votes. Majumder is the chairman of Mohona TV, a private television channel. He is a member of the Parliamentary standing committee on Housing and Public Works Ministry.

On 19 October 2024, a Dhaka court placed him on a three-day remand in connection with the killing of student Ikramul Haque. Ikramul had sustained bullet injuries on 4 August during the student-led mass uprising and later died at the Combined Military Hospital on 14 August. Chief Metropolitan Magistrate Judge Ali Haider passed the remand order after the investigation officer requested a seven-day remand. Kamal was arrested by police from Gulshan in the early hours of 18 October. Ikramul's father, Ziaul Haque, had filed a murder case on 7 September with Shah Ali police station.

== Personal life ==
Majumder is married to Shahida Majumdar. She is the daughter of Syed Yasin.Shahida was sued by Bangladesh Anti-Corruption Commission for possession of illegal wealth. His son, Ziauddin Ahmed Majumder Jewel, was the managing director of Mohona TV. Jewel was sentenced to 40 years in jail in 2002 for the murder of Shipu, a cell phone trader in Banani. Jewel died on 29 May 2017.

== Controversy ==
On 4 January 2012, Majumder, the president of the Monipur High School and College managing committee at that time, assaulted RTV journalist, Aparna Singha, and cameraman, Syed Haider in Mirpur.

He was fined in 2013 by Bangladesh Election Commission for violating the electoral code of conduct while campaigning for the 2014 Bangladesh general elections.

In 2014, he established an extrajudicial court called Social Justice Committee in his office in Mirpur. Mirpur police officers described the court as illegal.
