= Nazmul Haque Prodhan =

Bangladeshi politician

Member of the Bangladesh Parliament for Panchagarh-1
- In office 29 January 2014 – 28 January 2019
- Preceded by: Mazharul Haque Prodhan
- Succeeded by: Mazharul Haque Prodhan

Personal details
- Born: 16 January 1957 (age 69) Panchagarh
- Party: Jatiya Samajtantrik Dal

Nazmul Haque Prodhan (Bengali: নাজমুল হক প্রধান) is a Jatiya Samajtantrik Dal politician and a former member of parliament from Panchagarh-1.

== Early life ==
Prodhan was born on 16 January 1957. He has a B.A. and a M.S.S. degree.

== Career ==
Prodhan was elected to parliament on 5 January 2014 from Panchagarh-1 as an independent candidate. He is the general secretary of Jatiya Samajtantrik Dal.
