= Shamim Misir =

Bangladeshi politician

Member of Bangladesh Parliament
- In office 1973–1976

Personal details
- Political party: Awami League

Shamim Misir (Bengali: শামীম মিসির) is a Awami League politician in Bangladesh and a former member of parliament for Dhaka-15.

== Career ==
Misir was elected to parliament from Dhaka-15 as an Awami League candidate in 1973.
