= Satish Chandra Roy =

Bangladeshi politician (1941–2026)

- সতীশ চন্দ্র রায়

State Minister of Fisheries and Livestock

Minister of Primary and Mass Education

Personal details
- Born: 30 November 1941 Mostafabad, Biral thana, Bengal Province, British India
- Died: 18 August 2026 (aged 84) Dinajpur, Bangladesh
- Party: Bangladesh Awami League

Satish Chandra Roy (Bengali: সতীশ চন্দ্র রায় 30 November 1941 – 18 August 2026) was a Bangladesh Awami League politician who was State Minister of Fisheries and Livestock and Minister of Primary and Mass Education. He was a member of Awami League presidium council.

== Life and career ==
Satish Chandra Roy was born on 30 November 1941 in Mostafabad village of what is now Biral Upazila, Dinajpur District, Bangladesh.

He was a teacher. He was elected to parliament for constituency Dinajpur-7 as an Awami League candidate in 1979. He was elected to parliament for constituency Dinajpur-2 in 1986, 1991, and June 1996.

Roy died on 18 August 2026, at the age of 84.
