= Moidandighi Union =

Maidandighi Union ময়দানদিঘী ইউনিয়ন
- Union
- Moidandighi Union
- Location within Bangladesh
- Coordinates: 26.2560°N 88.5588°E
- Country: Bangladesh
- Division: Rangpur
- District: Panchagarh
- Upazila: Boda

Area
  - Total: 36.26 km^{2} (14.00 sq mi)

Population (2011)
  - Total: 23,936
  - Density: 660.1/km^{2} (1,710/sq mi)
- Time zone: UTC+6 (BST)
- Postal code: 5010
- Website: moidandighiup.panchagarh.gov.bd

Maidandighi Union (Bengali: ময়দানদিঘী ইউনিয়ন) is a union parishad of Boda Upazila, in Panchagarh District, Rangpur Division of northern Bangladesh. The union has an area of 36.26 square kilometres (14.00 sq mi) and as of 2011 had a population of 23,936. There are 56 villages and 12 mouzas in the union.
