= Boda, Bangladesh =

Boda বোদা
- Town and Municipality
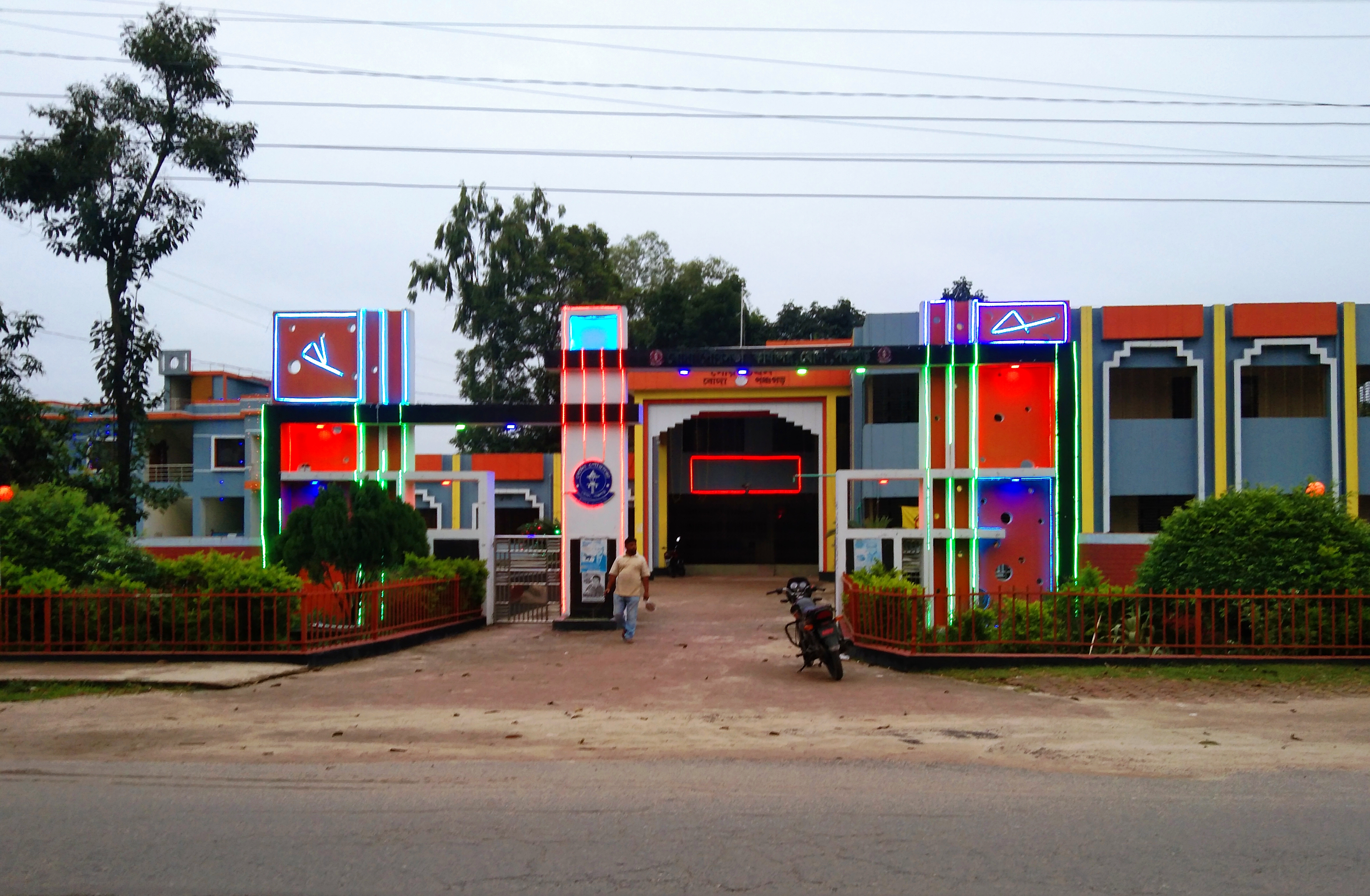
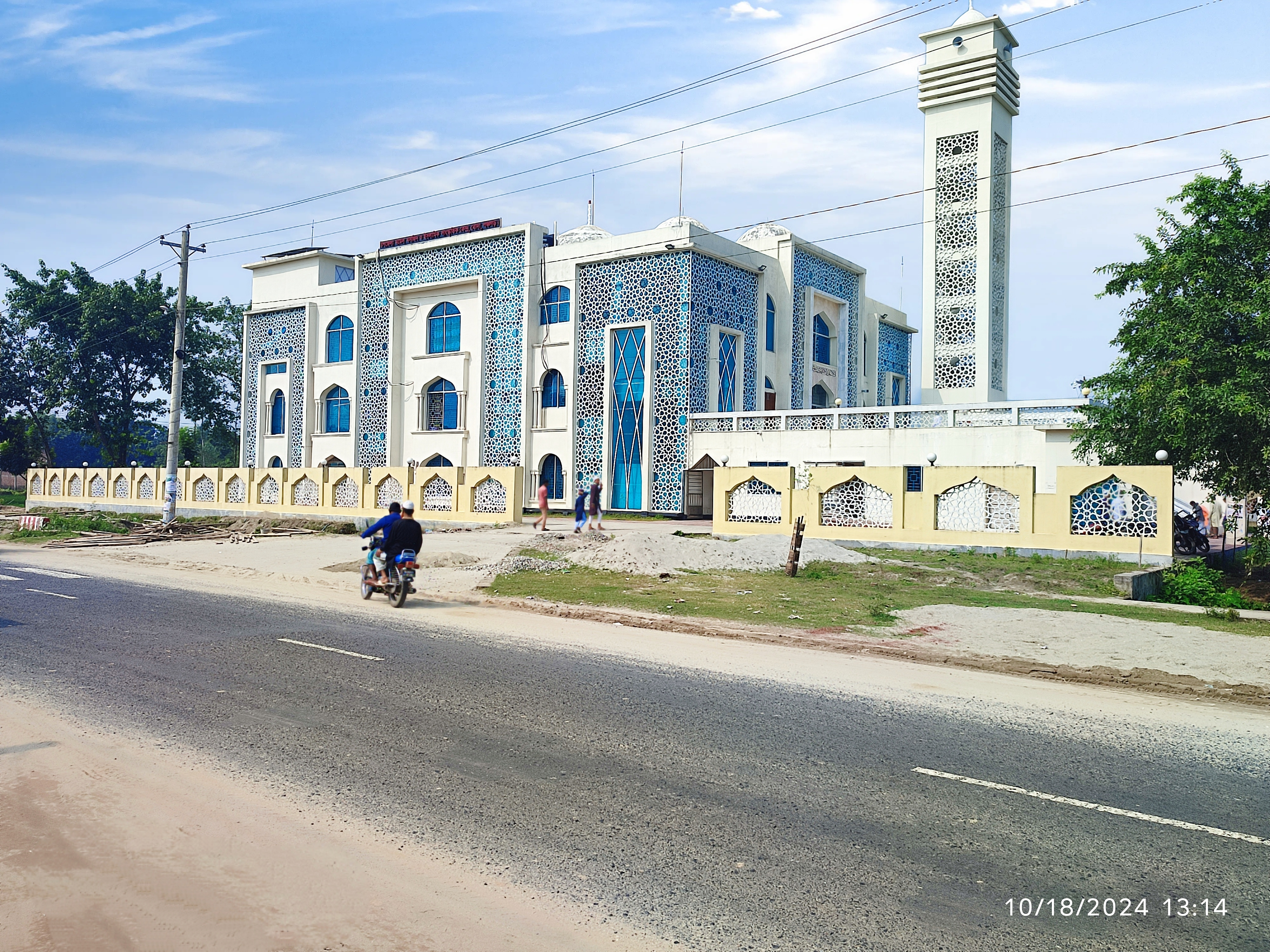
- From top (clockwise): Boda Municipality and Model Mosque, Boda

- Location in Rangpur Division Location in Bangladesh
- Coordinates: 26°12′03″N 88°33′21″E
- Country: Bangladesh
- Division: Rangpur
- District: Panchagarh
- Upazila: Boda
- Municipality established: 7 May 2001

Government
  - Type: Mayor–Council
  - Body: Boda Municipality
  - Present Mayor: vacant
  - First Mayor: Adv Wahiduzzaman Suza (Awami League)

Area
  - Municipality: 16.46 km^{2} (6.36 sq mi)
- Elevation: 65 m (213 ft)

Population (2022)
  - Municipality: 23,240
  - Density: 1,412/km^{2} (3,657/sq mi)
  - Urban: 35,936
  - Ethnicities: Bengali
- Time zone: UTC+6 (BST)
- Postal code: 5010
- Area code: 05653
- National Dialing Code: +880
- National Highway: N5; Asian Highway 2
- Website: boda.panchagarh.gov.bd

Boda Paurashava (Municipality) mahallah geocode map

Boda (Bengali: বোদা) is a town and a municipality in Panchagarh District, located in Rangpur Division of northern Bangladesh. It is the administrative headquarters and urban centre of Boda Upazila. The town derives its name from the historic Bordeshwari Temple, a prominent Hindu temple in the area.

== History ==
Boda is an ancient settlement that was historically part of the Greater Rangpur region. The name Boda is traditionally believed to be derived from the Bodeshwari (or Bordeshwari) Temple, a significant religious site in the region. During the British colonial period, the Boda Police Station was established in 1797 to strengthen administrative control in the region. From 1869 to 1947, Boda was part of the Jalpaiguri district. Boda was once the largest thana in the former Jalpaiguri District. Under Boda Thana, there were two police outposts: one at Jagdal, located north of present-day Panchagarh, and the other at Debiganj on the eastern bank of the Karatoya River. Over time, both Debiganj and Jagdal were upgraded to full-fledged police stations. The police station at Jagdal was later relocated to its present location and renamed Panchagarh. After the Partition of India in 1947, the area came under the administrative control of the Thakurgaon subdivision of Dinajpur District. At present, Boda is part of Panchagarh District. Subsequently, in 1982, Boda was upgraded to an upazila town, and later in 2001, it was declared a municipality (paurashava).

== Geography ==
Boda is located at 26°12′03″ north latitudes and 88°33′21″ east longitudes. The town is situated in the Rangpur Division of northern Bangladesh. Boda Municipality covers a total area of 16.46 square kilometres (6.35 sq mi). The elevation of Boda is approximately 65 meters (213 ft) above sea level. The Karatoya River flows through the eastern part of the upazila. The soil is mainly composed of old Himalayan piedmont plain alluvium.

=== Climate ===
The city of Boda has a monsoon influenced Humid subtropical climate (Cwa). There are four seasons in Boda- a hot and Humid Summer (March–May), rainy and severe monsoon season (June–September), Short and relatively dry Autumn or post Monsoon season (October–November) and a cold Winter (December–February) which is often more intense than other parts of Bangladesh due to its proximity to the Himalayas.

Climate data for Boda (Panchagarh District)
Month	Jan	Feb	Mar	Apr	May	Jun	Jul	Aug	Sep	Oct	Nov	Dec	Year
Record high °C (°F)	28.5 (83.3)	32.4 (90.3)	36.8 (98.2)	40.2 (104.4)	41.0 (105.8)	38.5 (101.3)	37.0 (98.6)	37.5 (99.5)	36.5 (97.7)	35.0 (95.0)	32.5 (90.5)	29.0 (84.2)	41.0 (105.8)
Mean daily maximum °C (°F)	22.0 (71.6)	25.5 (77.9)	30.2 (86.4)	32.5 (90.5)	32.1 (89.8)	31.8 (89.2)	31.5 (88.7)	31.9 (89.4)	31.4 (88.5)	30.1 (86.2)	27.5 (81.5)	24.2 (75.6)	29.2 (84.6)
Daily mean °C (°F)	15.2 (59.4)	18.5 (65.3)	23.1 (73.6)	26.3 (79.3)	27.5 (81.5)	28.3 (82.9)	28.5 (83.3)	28.6 (83.5)	27.9 (82.2)	25.4 (77.7)	21.0 (69.8)	17.1 (62.8)	24.0 (75.1)
Mean daily minimum °C (°F)	8.5 (47.3)	11.5 (52.7)	16.0 (60.8)	20.1 (68.2)	22.9 (73.2)	24.8 (76.6)	25.5 (77.9)	25.3 (77.5)	24.4 (75.9)	20.7 (69.3)	14.5 (58.1)	10.0 (50.0)	18.7 (65.6)
Record low °C (°F)	2.6 (36.7)	4.5 (40.1)	8.0 (46.4)	12.5 (54.5)	16.0 (60.8)	20.0 (68.0)	21.5 (70.7)	21.0 (69.8)	18.5 (65.3)	12.0 (53.6)	7.5 (45.5)	4.0 (39.2)	2.6 (36.7)
Average precipitation mm (inches)	8 (0.3)	12 (0.5)	28 (1.1)	85 (3.3)	260 (10.2)	540 (21.3)	610 (24.0)	480 (18.9)	420 (16.5)	165 (6.5)	10 (0.4)	5 (0.2)	2,623 (103.2)
Average precipitation days (≥ 1.0 mm)	1	1	2	6	12	16	20	16	14	5	1	1	95
Average relative humidity (%)	76	68	62	68	76	84	86	85	85	81	75	77	77
Mean monthly sunshine hours	180.5	201.2	240.6	215.1	200.5	135.2	120.4	150.6	145.2	210.5	220.4	190.2	2,210.4
Source 1: Bangladesh Meteorological Department
Source 2: Weather Spark (Panchagarh District Climate Data)

== Administration ==
Boda Municipality (Boda Paurashava) was established in 2001 and is divided into 9 wards and 32 mahallas. Boda Municipality consists of most of the area of Boda Sadar Union, part of Chandanbari Union under Boda Upazila, and a portion of Balarampur Union under Atwari Upazila. The terrain is primarily flat and the city is connected by road to other parts of Panchagarh District.

== Demographics ==
Religions in Boda town (2022)
Religion	Percent
Islam	88.92%
Hinduism	10.99%
Christianity	0.05%
Others	0.04%

According to the 2022 Bangladesh census, Boda Paurashava had 5,825 households and a total population of 23,240, consisting of 11,540 males and 11,699 females. The literacy rate for the municipality (aged 7 years and above) was 79.97%, with male literacy at 83.18% and female literacy at 76.81%. Boda Paurashava has a sex ratio of 98.64 males per 100 females.

== Education ==
Boda has several notable educational institutions that serve the people of the upazila and the surrounding region. Pathraj Government College is one of the prominent institutions in the city for higher education. Boda Government Pilot Model School and College is a prestigious secondary and higher secondary institution in the district, established during the British era.

The notable institutions are:

- Pathraj Government College, Boda
- Boda Government Pilot Model School and College
- Boda Pilot Girls' High School and College
- Boda Women's College

== See also ==
- List of cities and towns in Bangladesh
- Upazilas of Bangladesh
- Districts of Bangladesh
- Divisions of Bangladesh
- Upazila
- Thana
- Administrative geography of Bangladesh
