= Boda Upazila =

Upazila of Rangpur in Bangladesh

Boda Upazila বোদা উপজেলা
- Upazila of Bangladesh
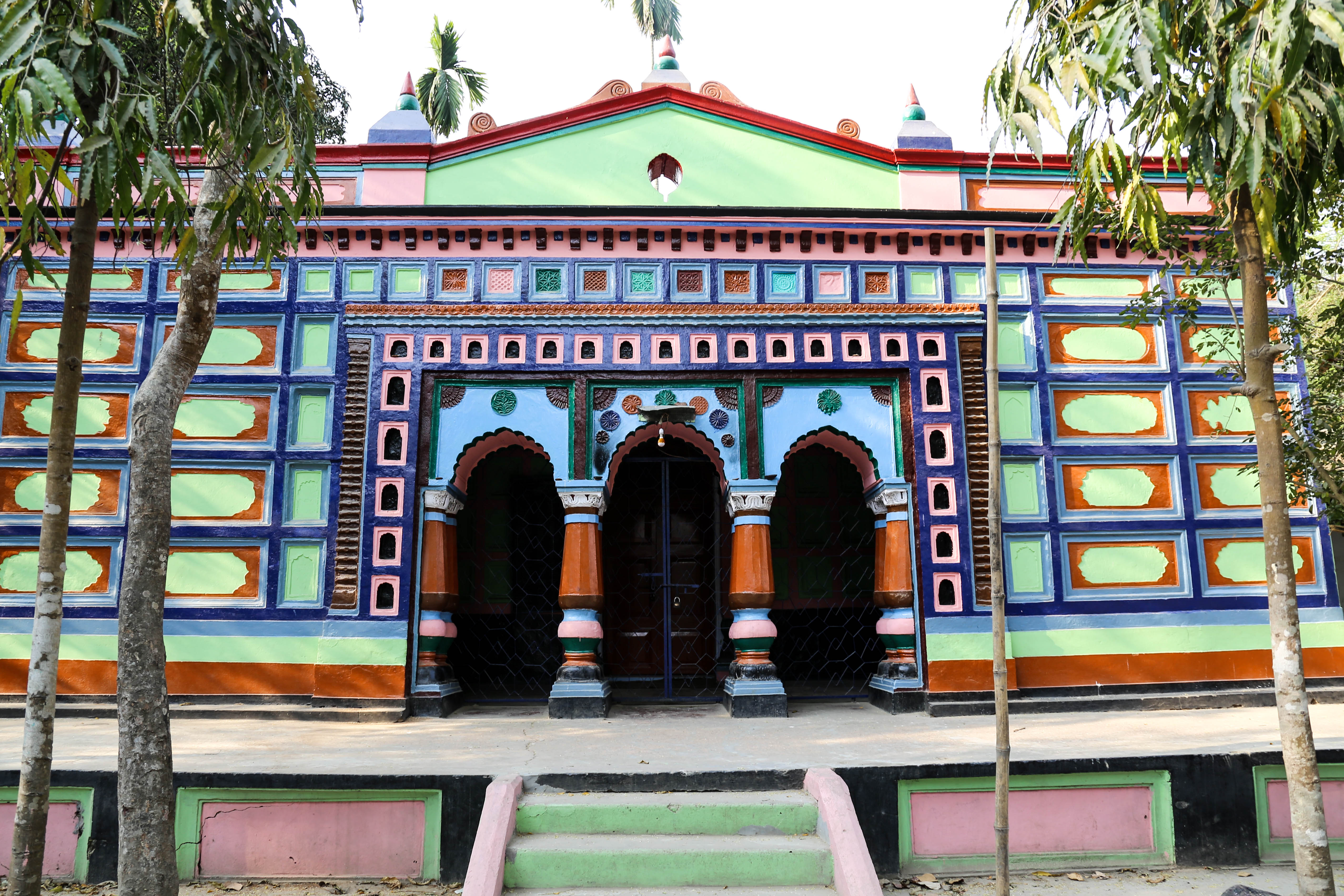
- Bodeshwari Temple in Boda Upazila

- Coordinates: 26°11′55″N 88°33′20″E
- Country: Bangladesh
- Division: Rangpur
- District: Panchagarh
- Jatiya Sangsad constituency: Panchagarh-2
- Headquarters: Boda

Government
  - Body: Upazila Council
  - MP: Farhad Hossain Azad
  - UNO (Upazila Executive Officer): Md. Rabiul Islam
  - Upazila Chairman: vacant

Area
  - Upazila: 349.47 km^{2} (134.93 sq mi)
  - Urban: 16.46 km^{2} (6.36 sq mi)

Population (2022)
  - Upazila: 275,282
  - Density: 787.71/km^{2} (2,040.2/sq mi)
  - Urban: 35,936
  - Urban density: 2,183/km^{2} (5,655/sq mi)
- Time zone: UTC+6 (BST)
- Postal code: 5010
- Area code: 05653
- Website: Official Map of Boda

Boda Upazila mauza geocode map

Boda Upazila (Bengali: বোদা উপজেলা) is an upazila of Panchagarh District in Rangpur Division, Bangladesh. It is the largest upazila in the district. Boda Town serves as the administrative center and principal town of Boda Upazila. The upazila is named Boda after the historic Bordeshwari Temple, a prominent Hindu temple located within the upazila.

== Geography ==
Boda Upazila is located at 26.2083°N 88.5597°E. It has 67,429 households and total area 349.47 km^{2}.

== Demographics ==
Religions in Boda Upazila (2022)
Religion	Percent
Islam	77.32%
Hinduism	22.52%
Other or not stated	0.16%

According to the 2022 Bangladeshi census, Boda Upazila had 67,429 households and a population of 275,282. 10.16% of the population were under 5 years of age. Boda had a literacy rate (age 7 and over) of 73.67%: 76.77% for males and 70.64% for females, and a sex ratio of 98.28 males for every 100 females. 35,936 (13.05%) lived in urban areas.

According to the 2011 Census of Bangladesh, Boda Upazila had 56,102 households and a population of 232,124. 54,467 (23.46%) were under 10 years of age. Boda had a literacy rate (age 7 and over) of 51.81%, compared to the national average of 51.8%, and a sex ratio of 992 females per 1000 males. 17,030 (7.34%) lived in urban areas.

As of the 1991 Bangladesh census, Boda had a population of 168,258. Males constituted 51.22% of the population, and females 48.78%. This upazila's eighteen-up population is 83,118. Boda had an average literacy rate of 29.4% (7+ years), and the national average of 32.4% literate.

== Administration ==
UNO: Md. Rabiul Islam.

Boda Upazila is divided into Boda Municipality and ten union parishads: Benghari Banagram, Boda Sadar Union, Boroshoshi Union, Chandanbari Union, Jholaishal Shiri Union, Kajoldighi Kaligonj Union, Marea Bamonhat Union, Moidan Dighi Union, Pachpir Union, and Sakoa Union. The union parishads are subdivided into 174 mauzas and 219 villages.

Boda Municipality is subdivided into 9 wards and 32 mahallas.

== See also ==
- Upazilas of Bangladesh
- Districts of Bangladesh
- Divisions of Bangladesh
- Administrative geography of Bangladesh
